= Brooklyn Nets accomplishments and records =

The Brooklyn Nets are an American professional basketball team based in Brooklyn, New York. The team plays in the Atlantic Division of the Eastern Conference in the National Basketball Association (NBA).

== Franchise leaders ==
Bold denotes still active with the team. Italics denotes still active, but not with the team. "Name*" includes combined statistics for the team from both the ABA and NBA.

Points scored (regular season) as of the end of the 2025–26 season

1. Brook Lopez (10,444)
2. Buck Williams (10,440)
3. Vince Carter (8,834)
4. Richard Jefferson (8,507)
5. Jason Kidd (7,373)
6. John Williamson* (7,202)
7. Julius Erving* (7,104)
8. Kerry Kittles (7,096)
9. Derrick Coleman (6,930)
10. Chris Morris (6,762)
11. Mike Gminski (6,415)
12. Billy Paultz* (6,297)
13. Bill Melchionni* (6,230)
14. Otis Birdsong (5,968)
15. Keith Van Horn (5,700)
16. Albert King (5,595)
17. Joe Harris (5,007)
18. Spencer Dinwiddle (4,953)
19. Kendall Gill (4,932)
20. Darwin Cook (4,699)

Other statistics (regular season) as of the end of the 2025–26 season

Most minutes played
Player	Minutes
Buck Williams	23,100
Jason Kidd	18,733
Brook Lopez	18,118
Richard Jefferson	17,499
Kerry Kittles	16,686

Most rebounds
Player	Rebounds
Buck Williams	7,576
Billy Paultz*	4,544
Brook Lopez	4,004
Derrick Coleman	3,690
Mike Gminski	3,671

Most assists
Player	Assists
Jason Kidd	4,620
Bill Melchionni*	3,044
Kenny Anderson	2,363
Deron Williams	2,078
Spencer Dinwiddle	1,985

Most steals
Player	Steals
Jason Kidd	950
Darwin Cook	875
Kerry Kittles	803
Chris Morris	784
Kendall Gill	652

Most blocks
Player	Blocks
Brook Lopez	972
George Johnson	863
Buck Williams	696
**Nic Claxton**	611
Mike Gminski	599

== Accomplishments ==
=== Basketball Hall of Fame ===
Players
No.	Name	Position	Tenure	Inducted
24	Rick Barry	F	1970–1972	1987
1	Nate Archibald	G	1976–1977	1991
32	Julius Erving	F	1973–1976	1993
21	Bob McAdoo	C	1981	2000
3	Dražen Petrović	G	1990–1993	2002
34	Mel Daniels	C	1976	2012
22	Bernard King	F	1977–1979	2013
30	Bernard King	F	1992–1993	2013
33	Alonzo Mourning	C	2003–2004	2014
55	Dikembe Mutombo	C	2002–2003	2015
10	Maurice Cheeks	G	1992–1993	2018
5	Jason Kidd (Note: Also served as head coach of the team in 2013–2014.)	G	2001–2008	2018

Coaches
Name	Position	Tenure	Inducted
Lou Carnesecca	Head coach	1970–1973	1992
Chuck Daly (Note: Daly was inducted into the Hall of Fame twice—as coach and as a member of the 1992 Olympic team.)	Head coach	1992–1994	1994
Larry Brown	Head coach	1981–1983	2002
John Calipari	Head coach	1996–1999	2015
Bill Fitch	Head coach	1989–1992	2019

Contributors
Name	Position	Tenure	Inducted
Rod Thorn	Assistant coach	1973–1975, 1976–1978	2018
Rod Thorn	Executive	2000–2010	2018

==== FIBA Hall of Fame ====
Players
No.	Name	Position	Tenure	Inducted
3	Dražen Petrović	G	1991–1993	2007
33	Alonzo Mourning	C	2003–2004	2019

=== Retired numbers ===
Brooklyn Nets retired numbers
No.	Player	Position	Tenure	Date
3	Dražen Petrović	G	1990–1993	November 11, 1993
5	Jason Kidd	G	2001–2008	October 17, 2013
6	Bill Russell	—	Retired across NBA	August 11, 2022
23	John Williamson	G	1973–1980	December 7, 1990
25	Bill Melchionni	G	1969–1976	September 1976
32	Julius Erving	F	1973–1976	April 3, 1987
52	Buck Williams	F	1981–1989	April 11, 1999

== Individual awards ==
=== NBA ===
NBA Rookie of the Year

- Buck Williams – 1982
- Derrick Coleman – 1991

NBA Executive of the Year

- Rod Thorn – 2002

NBA Sportsmanship Award

- Patty Mills – 2022

J. Walter Kennedy Citizenship Award

- Wayne Ellington – 2016

All-NBA First Team

- Jason Kidd – 2002, 2004

All-NBA Second Team

- Buck Williams – 1983
- Jason Kidd – 2003

All-NBA Third Team

- Derrick Coleman – 1993, 1994
- Dražen Petrović – 1993
- Stephon Marbury – 2000
- Kyrie Irving – 2021

NBA All-Defensive First Team

- Jason Kidd – 2002, 2006

NBA All-Defensive Second Team

- Buck Williams – 1988
- Jason Kidd – 2003–2005, 2007

NBA All-Rookie First Team

- Bernard King – 1978
- Buck Williams – 1982
- Derrick Coleman – 1991
- Keith Van Horn – 1998
- Kenyon Martin – 2001
- Brook Lopez – 2009
- Mason Plumlee – 2014

NBA All-Rookie Second Team

- Chris Morris – 1989
- Kerry Kittles – 1997
- Richard Jefferson – 2002
- Nenad Krstić – 2004
- Marcus Williams – 2007
- MarShon Brooks – 2012
- Bojan Bogdanović – 2015

=== ABA ===
ABA Most Valuable Player

- Julius Erving – 1974–1976

ABA Playoffs Most Valuable Player

- Julius Erving – 1974, 1976

ABA Rookie of the Year

- Brian Taylor – 1973

All-ABA Team First Team

- Rick Barry – 1971, 1972
- Bill Melchionni – 1972
- Julius Erving – 1974–1976

All-ABA Team Second Team

- Brian Taylor – 1975

ABA All-Star Game head coaches

- Kevin Loughery – 1975, 1976

ABA All-Time Team

- Julius Erving
- Rick Barry
- Billy Paultz

ABA All-Defensive Team

- Mike Gale – 1974
- Brian Taylor – 1975, 1976
- Julius Erving – 1976

ABA All-Rookie Team

- John Roche – 1972
- Jim Chones – 1973
- Brian Taylor – 1973
- Larry Kenon – 1974
- John Williamson – 1974
- Kim Hughes – 1976

=== NBA All-Star Weekend ===
NBA All-Star Game Selections

- Buck Williams – 1982, 1983, 1986
- Otis Birdsong – 1984
- Micheal Ray Richardson – 1985
- Kenny Anderson – 1994
- Derrick Coleman – 1994
- Jayson Williams – 1998
- Stephon Marbury – 2001
- Jason Kidd – 2002–2004, 2007, (Note: Did not participate) 2008
- Kenyon Martin – 2004
- Vince Carter – 2005–2007
- Devin Harris – 2009
- Deron Williams – 2012
- Brook Lopez – 2013
- Joe Johnson – 2014
- D'Angelo Russell – 2019
- Kevin Durant – 2021, 2022, (Note: Did not participate) 2023
- James Harden – 2021, 2022
- Kyrie Irving – 2021, 2023

NBA All-Star Game head coaches

- Byron Scott – 2002

=== Playoff appearances ===
==== ABA ====
- 1970
- 1971
- 1972
- 1973
- 1974
- 1975
- 1976

==== NBA ====
- 1979
- 1982
- 1983
- 1984
- 1985
- 1986
- 1992
- 1993
- 1994
- 1998
- 2002
- 2003
- 2004
- 2005
- 2006
- 2007
- 2013
- 2014
- 2015
- 2019
- 2020
- 2021
- 2022
- 2023

== Records ==
GP	Games played	FGM	Field-goals	3PFGM	Three-point field goals	FTM	Free throw
MP	Minutes played	FG%	Field goal percentage^{[a]}	3P%	Three-point field goal percentage^{[a]}	FT%	Free throw percentage^{[a]}
PTS	Points	REB	Rebounds	AST	Assists	PF	Personal fouls
PPG	Points per game	RPG	Rebounds per game	APG	Assists per game	OT	Overtime
STL	Steals	BLK	Blocks	TO	Turnovers
SPG	Steals per game	BPG	Blocks per game

=== Individual records ===
==== Career leaders ====
As of the end of the 2025–26 season

Category	Player	Statistics
Games	Buck Williams	635
Minutes	Buck Williams	23,100
Number of seasons	Brook Lopez	9
Points	Brook Lopez	10,444
Total rebounds	Buck Williams	7,576
Defensive rebounds	Buck Williams	4,988
Offensive rebounds	Buck Williams	2,588
Assists	Jason Kidd	4,620
Steals	Jason Kidd	950
Blocks	Brook Lopez	972
Triple doubles	Jason Kidd	61
Buzzer beaters	Joe Johnson	6
Field goals	Brook Lopez	4,044
Field goal %	Nic Claxton	.622
3-point field goals	Joe Harris	984
3-point field goal %	Yuta Watanabe	.444
Free throws	Buck Williams	2,476
Free throw %	Kevin Durant	.910
Consecutive free throws made	Kevin Durant	62
Points per game	Rick Barry	30.6
Minutes per game	Rick Barry	44.0
Rebounds per game	Buck Williams	11.9
Assists per game	Jason Kidd	9.1
Steals per game	Micheal Ray Richardson	2.7
Blocks per game	Shawn Bradley	3.8
Personal fouls	Buck Williams	2,244
Turnovers	Buck Williams	1,811

==== Season leaders ====
As of the end of the 2025–26 season

Category	Player	Statistics	Season
Minutes	Rick Barry	3,616	1971–72
Points	Rick Barry	2,518	1971–72
Total rebounds	Billy Paultz	1,035	1971–72
Defensive rebounds	Billy Paultz	772	1971–72
Offensive rebounds	Jayson Williams	443	1997–98
Assists	Jason Kidd	808	2001–02
Steals	Micheal Ray Richardson	243	1984–85
Blocks	George Johnson	274	1977–78
Triple doubles	Jason Kidd	12	2006–07; 2007–08
Triple doubles	James Harden	12	2020–21
Buzzer beaters	Joe Johnson	2	2012–13; 2013–14
Field goals	Julius Erving	949	1975–76
Field goal %	Nic Claxton	.705	2022–23
3-point field goals	D'Angelo Russell	234	2018–19
3-point field goal %	Joe Harris	.475	2020–21
Free throws	Rick Barry	641	1971–72
Free throw %	Kevin Durant	.934	2022–23
Points per game	Rick Barry	31.5	1971–72
Rebounds per game	Jayson Williams	13.6	1997–98
Assists per game	Kevin Porter	10.8	1977–78
Steals per game	Micheal Ray Richardson	3.0	1984–85
Blocks per game	Shawn Bradley	4.0	1996–97
Personal fouls	Darryl Dawkins	386	1983–84
Turnovers	Kevin Porter	348	1977–78

== See also ==
- List of NBA regular season records

== Notes ==
- ^{a} Shooting percentages in basketball are calculated by taking the number of field goals, three-pointers, or free throws attempted, and dividing it by the corresponding number of shots taken.
- ^{b} A regulation NBA game is 48 minutes long.
