= 1975–76 New York Nets season =

ABA professional basketball team season

- ABA champions
- Division champions
- Head coach: Kevin Loughery
- Arena: Nassau Veterans Memorial Coliseum

Results
- Record: 55–29 (.655)
- Place: Division: 1st Conference: 2nd (ABA)
- Playoff finish: ABA champions (defeated Nuggets 4–2)
- Stats at Basketball Reference

Local media
- Television: WOR 9
- Radio: WMCA

The 1975–76 New York Nets season was the ninth and final season of American Basketball Association basketball for the franchise, which saw them first play as the New Jersey Americans in their inaugural season before later playing the rest of their years in the league in Long Island as the New York Nets. Before the season began properly (specifically over a week after the 1975 ABA draft came and went), tragedy would strike with the team as beloved small forward Wendell Ladner was one of 113 fatalities (out of 124 total people) found in the Eastern Air Lines Flight 66, with him being identified by his championship ring with the Nets from the 1973–74 season as well as being the only ABA player to die during their career while in the league. After the tragic event, the Nets would dedicate the upcoming season to Ladner, with them later honoring him in future years as well. Also before the season began, the Nets and Denver Nuggets attempted to jump ship from the ABA to the National Basketball Association (NBA) early (with them wanting the Kentucky Colonels to join them since they saw each other as the strongest ABA teams left over by that point in time), but the judges preceding in their case informed them to stay in the ABA for at least one more season first due to the notion that even having two ABA teams join the NBA like that would still technically count as a merger happening between leagues. By the end of the season, the Nets were the second-best team in the league behind only the Nuggets (who finished with a league-best 60–24 record), having them easily earn a spot in the 1976 ABA Playoffs, with the Nets unofficially being the final Eastern Division winners of the final ABA season in the process had the ABA not gotten rid of divisions entirely following the folding of the Utah Stars. The Nets won what would be their second and final ABA Championship by first beating the San Antonio Spurs 4–3 in the semifinal round before beating the Nuggets 4–2 in the championship round. By the end of the season, the Nets would join the Denver Nuggets, San Antonio Spurs, and Indiana Pacers as the final four surviving ABA teams from the ABA-NBA merger to make it to the NBA, though the Nets would suffer the biggest consequences of the four teams once they finally entered the NBA properly due to them encroaching up onto the New York Knicks' territory as a new nearby, almost cityside rivaling organization (with the Nets playing in the Long Island area at the time) that the Knicks' ownership group was apprehensive of for the longest time.

With the Nets losing their only two NBA Finals appearances in 2002 and 2003 (the latter series a loss to fellow former ABA franchise San Antonio), the 1976 ABA championship remains the Nets franchise's most recent title in any league.

== ABA Draft ==
Round	Pick	Player	Position(s)	Nationality	College
1	9	John Lucas II	PG	United States	Maryland
2	19	George Bucci	SG	United States	Manhattan College
3	29	Leon Douglas	C	United States	Alabama
4	39	Bob Guyette	PF	United States	Kentucky
5	49	Darryl Brown	PF/C	United States	Fordham
6	59	Mike Mitchell	SF	United States	Auburn
7	69	Wayne Croft	PF	United States	Clemson
8	79	John Lambert	PF/C	United States	USC

== Roster ==
1975–76 New York Nets roster
Players

Pos.	No.	Player	Height	Weight	DOB	From
PF	21	Tim Bassett	6 ft 8 in (2.03 m)	225 lb (102 kg)	1951-04-01	Georgia
SG	11	George Bucci	6 ft 3 in (1.91 m)	200 lb (91 kg)	1953-07-09	Manhattan
F/C	22	Jim Eakins	6 ft 11 in (2.11 m)	215 lb (98 kg)	1946-05-24	BYU
SF	32	Julius Erving	6 ft 7 in (2.01 m)	210 lb (95 kg)	1950-02-22	UMass
C	35	Kim Hughes	6 ft 11 in (2.11 m)	220 lb (100 kg)	1952-06-04	Wisconsin
PF	33	Rich Jones	6 ft 6 in (1.98 m)	220 lb (100 kg)	1946-12-27	Memphis
SG	24	Ted McClain	6 ft 1 in (1.85 m)	180 lb (82 kg)	1946-08-30	Tennessee State
PG	25	Bill Melchionni	6 ft 1 in (1.85 m)	165 lb (75 kg)	1944-10-19	Villanova
C	31	Swen Nater	6 ft 11 in (2.11 m)	240 lb (109 kg)	1950-01-14	UCLA
SF	15, 24	Billy Schaeffer	6 ft 5 in (1.96 m)	200 lb (91 kg)	1951-12-11	St. John's
SG	30	Al Skinner	6 ft 3 in (1.91 m)	190 lb (86 kg)	1952-06-16	UMass
PG	14	Brian Taylor	6 ft 2 in (1.88 m)	185 lb (84 kg)	1951-06-09	Princeton
SF	12	Chuck Terry	6 ft 6 in (1.98 m)	215 lb (98 kg)	1950-09-27	Long Beach State
SG	23	John Williamson	6 ft 2 in (1.88 m)	185 lb (84 kg)	1951-11-10	New Mexico State

Coaches
Head coach
- Kevin Loughery

Legend
- (DP) Unsigned draft pick
- (FA) Free agent
- (S) Suspended
- Injured

Roster

== Exhibition Games ==
On October 4, 1975, the Nets played their first exhibition game of the season, facing the Washington Bullets of the NBA in the Capital Center in Landover, Maryland. Julius Erving scored 36 points to lead the Nets, but the Bullets managed a one-point victory, 109–108.

The Nets faced the New York Knicks on October 8 in Uniondale, New York. The Nets prevailed, 110–104.

On October 11 the Nets ventured to Buffalo, New York, to face the Buffalo Braves on the Braves' home court. 15,000 fans attended the game. Erving was held to 16 points, but the Nets won by a large margin, 109–83.

The Nets traveled to New Haven, Connecticut, on October 14 to play the Washington Bullets for the second time in the preseason. The Nets avenged their loss of ten days earlier, winning 122–114.

The very next day, on October 15, the Golden State Warriors took the court against the Nets in Uniondale. Erving led the Nets with 43 points but Rick Barry had 49 for Golden State as the Warriors won, 119–114.

Two days later the Nets traveled to Seton Hall for a rematch with the Buffalo Braves on October 17. The Nets won again, 117–97.

The next day, October 18, saw the Nets play their final ABA vs. NBA exhibition game as they took the court at Madison Square Garden to again face their in-state rivals from the NBA, the New York Knicks. Julius Erving scored 33 points and hit a jump shot at the buzzer to win the game for the Nets, 103–101.

The Nets finished their ABA tenure with a record of 15 wins and 9 losses against NBA teams in exhibition games. The Nets went 2–0 against the NBA before the 1971–72 season, 0–3 before 1972–73, 4–1 prior to the 1973–74 campaign, 4–3 before the 1974–75 season and 5–2 before the 1975–76 season. Overall, the ABA went 79–76 in the interleague matchups, faring poorly at first but going 62–34 in the last three years of the league.

== Regular season ==
=== Season standings ===
Team	W	L	PCT.	GB
Denver Nuggets *	60	24	.714	—
**New York Nets** *	55	29	.655	5
San Antonio Spurs *	50	34	.595	10
Kentucky Colonels *	46	38	.548	14
Indiana Pacers *	39	45	.464	21
Spirits of St. Louis	35	49	.417	25
Virginia Squires †	15	68	.181	44
San Diego Sails †	3	8	.273	—
Utah Stars †	4	12	.250	—
Baltimore Claws †	0	0	.000	—

Asterisk (*) denotes playoff team
† did not survive the end of the season.
Bold – ABA champions

== Player statistics ==
Note: GP= Games played; MIN= Minutes; STL= Steals; REB = Rebounds; ASST = Assists; BLK = Blocks; PTS = Points

Player	GP	MIN	STL	REB	ASST	BLK	PTS
Julius Erving	84	3244	207	925	423	160	2462
John Williamson	76	2255	76	190	188	33	1233
Rich Jones	83	2427	81	428	131	21	1096
Brian Taylor	54	1733	125	162	204	22	904
Al Skinner	83	2082	91	307	280	50	865
Kim Hughes	84	2162	98	775	55	120	692
Tim Bassett	84	1790	47	531	65	41	405
Bill Melchionni	67	1191	52	88	266	8	386
Swen Nater	43	1016	18	441	19	26	376
Ted McClain	30	696	57	73	106	10	340
Chuck Terry	66	970	36	144	38	6	220
Jim Eakins	34	463	7	120	18	20	211
George Bucci	33	237	12	37	15	3	128
Billy Schaeffer	20	119	6	22	9	2	72

== ABA Playoffs ==
ABA Semifinals vs. San Antonio Spurs

**Game**	**Date**	**Location**	**Score**	**Record**	**Attendance**
1	April 9	New York	116–101	1–0	8,221
2	April 11	San Antonio	79–105	1–1	5,769
3	April 14	New York	103–111	1–2	10,009
4	April 18	San Antonio	110–108	2–2	9,277
5	April 19	New York	110–108	3–2	11,321
6	April 21	San Antonio	105–106	3–3	10,484
7	April 24	New York	121–114	4–3	15,934

Nets win series, 4–3

ABA Finals vs. Denver Nuggets

**Game**	**Date**	**Location**	**Score**	**Record**	**Attendance**
1	May 1	Denver	120–118	1–0	19,034
2	May 4	Denver	121–127	1–1	19,107
3	May 6	New York	117–111	2–1	12,243
4	May 8	New York	121–112	3–1	15,934
5	May 11	Denver	110–118	3–2	18,881
6	May 13	New York	112–106	4–2	15,934

Nets win series, 4–2

This is, to date, the last championship the Nets have won in professional basketball. This would also be the last playoff series ever done in the ABA, with the Nets being the final champions in the league's history.

== Awards, Records and Honors ==
- Julius Erving, ABA Finals MVP
