= Bill Melchionni =

American basketball player (born 1944)

Personal information
- Born: October 19, 1944 (age 82) Philadelphia, Pennsylvania, U.S.
- Listed height: 6 ft 1 in (1.85 m)
- Listed weight: 165 lb (75 kg)

Career information
- High school: Bishop Eustace Prep (Pennsauken Township, New Jersey)
- College: Villanova (1963–1966)
- NBA draft: 1966: 2nd round, 19th overall pick
- Drafted by: Philadelphia 76ers
- Playing career: 1966–1976
- Position: Point guard
- Number: 28, 3, 25

Career history
- 1966–1968: Philadelphia 76ers
- 1968–1970: Trenton Colonials
- 1969–1976: New York Nets

Career highlights
- NBA champion (1967); 2× ABA champion (1974, 1976); 3× ABA All-Star (1971–1973); 3× ABA assists leader (1971–1973); All-ABA First Team (1972); No. 25 retired by Brooklyn Nets; No. 25 retired by Villanova Wildcats; Robert V. Geasey Trophy winner (1966); NIT MVP (1966)

Career NBA and ABA statistics
- Points: 6,870 (10.6 ppg)
- Rebounds: 1,284 (2.0 rpg)
- Assists: 3,247 (5.0 apg)
- Stats at NBA.com
- Stats at Basketball Reference

William P. Melchionni (born October 19, 1944) is an American former National Basketball Association (NBA) and American Basketball Association (ABA) player. A three time All-Star, Melchionni is one of only four players to win NBA and ABA championships.

== Early life ==
Melchionni was a guard from Bishop Eustace Prep (in his hometown of Pennsauken Township, New Jersey). His teams won two state championships.

Melchionni was a collegiate star in the mid-1960s at Villanova University and was the Most Valuable Player in the 1966 NIT, as Villanova finished in third place in the tournament.

Melchionni averaged 27.6 points as a senior at Villanova, as the team finished 18–11. As a junior, in 1964–1965, he averaged 19.4 points for the 23-5 Wildcats, who ended up #8 in the national rankings. In the 1966 season, the Wildcats won 9 of their last 10 games, finishing 3rd in the 1966 National Invitation Tournament, with Melchionni chosen as Tournament MVP. Melchionni scored 1,612 points during his career at Villanova.

Melchionni graduated in 1966 from Villanova with a B.S. Degree in economics.

== Professional career ==
Upon graduation from Villanova, Melchionni was a 2nd-round (19th) overall pick by the Philadelphia 76ers in the 1966 NBA draft. Melchionni joined the Phillips 66ers AAU Elite team before returning to his hometown to join the Philadelphia 76ers in 1966–1967.

Immediately, Melchionni was a key reserve on what is, statistically speaking, the greatest 76ers team ever, the 1967 NBA champions led by Wilt Chamberlain, Luke Jackson, Hal Greer, Chet Walker, Billy Cunningham, and fellow Villanova alum Wali Jones. The team was coached by another AAU Elite alum, Alex Hannum. Melchionni played in 71 games, averaging 4.3 points and 1.3 assists for the championship 76ers.

After another season in Philadelphia, Melchionni then played for the Trenton Colonials of the Eastern Professional Basketball League in 1968–1969.

In 1969–1970, Melchionni found a home in the upstart ABA, joining the New York Nets. With the Nets, he became a 3-time ABA All-Star, leading the league in assists multiple times and winning two more championships. In 1969–1970, he averaged 15.2 points and 5.7 assists; in 1970–1971: 17.6 points and 8.3 assists (leading the ABA); in 1971–1972: 21.0 points and 8.4 assists (leading the ABA); and in 1972–1973 12.3 points and 7.4 assists.

In 1971–1972, Melchionni suffered a broken hand.

In his Nets career, he played alongside Rick Barry and a young Julius Erving. After the Nets drafted future ABA All-Star Brian Taylor in 1972, Melchionni became a key reserve player on the 1974 and 1976 ABA championship teams. He averaged 12.4 points and 6.1 assists in seven seasons with the Nets. In his entire career, Melchionni averaged 10.6 points and 5.0 assists in 646 games.

Of his career, Melchionni said, "With Julius, we won two ABA titles. To be able to say I played with and won championships with Wilt and Julius, arguably two of the top 10 players in basketball history, means something special to me."

== Post-playing career ==
Melchionni became the general manager of the Nets for two years after retiring as a player. Due to financial constraints on the Nets, he was forced to sell Erving to the 76ers to fund the Nets fee for joining the NBA in the ABA-NBA merger. He resigned from the Nets on March 15, 1978. Melchionni worked at Salomon Brothers Investment Bank after leaving the Nets.

== Awards and personal life ==
Melchionni played in three ABA All-Star Games, and was named to the All-ABA First Team in 1972. Melchionni led the ABA in assists per game in 1971, 1972, and 1973.

In 1995, Melchionni's number 25 jersey was retired by Villanova.

The New Jersey Nets retired Melchionni's number 25. His is one of only seven retired Nets jerseys, joining (#3) Dražen Petrović, (#5) Jason Kidd, (#15) Vince Carter, (#23) John Williamson, (#32) Julius Erving, and (#52) Buck Williams

Melchionni was ranked #15 on a list of All-Time Nets players.

Melchionni's brother Gary was a two-year captain for Duke and was an All-ACC performer. Gary's son and Bill's nephew, Lee Melchionni, played for Duke from 2002 to 2006. Bill's brother Bob followed Bill at Villanova and played from 1966 through 1969.

== Career statistics ==
Legend
GP	Games played	GS	Games started	MPG	Minutes per game
FG%	Field goal percentage	3P%	3-point field goal percentage	FT%	Free throw percentage
RPG	Rebounds per game	APG	Assists per game	SPG	Steals per game
BPG	Blocks per game	PPG	Points per game	**Bold**	Career high
†	Won an NBA championship	*	Led the league

†	Denotes seasons in which Brown's team won an ABA championship

=== NBA/ABA ===
==== Regular season ====
Year	Team	GP	MPG	FG%	3P%	FT%	RPG	APG	SPG	BPG	PPG
1966–67†	Philadelphia	73	9.5	.391		.650	1.3	1.3			4.3
1967–68	Philadelphia	71	10.7	.435		.702	1.5	1.5			4.6
1969–70	N.Y. Nets (ABA)	80	39.5	.465	.179	.820	2.9	5.7			15.2
1970–71	N.Y. Nets (ABA)	**81**	40.5	.451	.091	.814	2.9	8.3*			17.6
1971–72	N.Y. Nets (ABA)	80	**41.6**	**.499**	.105	.808	**3.1**	**8.4***			**21.0**
1972–73	N.Y. Nets (ABA)	61	30.3	.450	**.400**	.840	2.1	7.4*			12.3
1973–74†	N.Y. Nets (ABA)	56	20.5	.420	.217	.831	1.4	3.7	**.9**	**.1**	5.3
1974–75	N.Y. Nets (ABA)	77	18.0	.487	.296	.795	1.0	4.2	**.9**	**.1**	6.1
1975–76†	N.Y. Nets (ABA)	67	17.8	.416	.391	**.849**	1.3	4.0	.8	**.1**	5.8
Career (NBA)		144	10.1	.412		.673	1.4	1.4			4.4
Career (ABA)		502	30.6	.465	.236	.819	2.2	6.1	.9	.1	12.4
Career (overall)		646	26.0	.459	.236	.809	2.0	5.0	.9	.1	10.6
All-Star (ABA)		3	22.0	.400	–	.833	3.7	2.7	1.0	.0	7.0

==== Playoffs ====
Year	Team	GP	MPG	FG%	3P%	FT%	RPG	APG	SPG	BPG	PPG
1967†	Philadelphia	1	5.0	.000		.000	3.0	1.0			.0
1968	Philadelphia	9	5.6	.333		.500	.4	1.1			2.0
1970	N.Y. Nets (ABA)	7	**45.1**	.462	**.333**	.816	**3.1**	4.7			18.3
1971	N.Y. Nets (ABA)	5	41.0	.537	–	.923	1.4	**8.2**			**22.4**
1972	N.Y. Nets (ABA)	**11**	34.2	.401	.000	.804	2.4	6.3			14.5
1973	N.Y. Nets (ABA)	5	34.8	**.558**	**.333**	.810	2.0	6.2			13.2
1974†	N.Y. Nets (ABA)	6	10.0	.500	–	**1.000**	1.5	2.7	.2	.0	3.0
1975	N.Y. Nets (ABA)	5	21.6	.359	.167	.714	2.4	6.4	.2	**.2**	6.8
1976†	N.Y. Nets (ABA)	6	6.0	.286	.000	**1.000**	.8	.8	**.3**	.0	1.7
Career (NBA)		10	5.5	.308		.333	.7	1.1			1.8
Career (ABA)		45	28.3	.451	.167	.831	2.0	5.0	.2	.1	11.7
Career (overall)		55	24.2	.443	.167	.811	1.8	4.3	.2	.1	9.9
