= Tim Bassett =

American basketball player (1951–2018)

Personal information
- Born: April 1, 1951 Washington, D.C., U.S.
- Died: December 9, 2018 (aged 67)
- Listed height: 6 ft 8 in (2.03 m)
- Listed weight: 225 lb (102 kg)

Career information
- High school: McKinley (Washington, D.C.)
- College: College of Southern Idaho (1969–1971); Georgia (1971–1973)
- NBA draft: 1973: 7th round, 106th overall pick
- Drafted by: Buffalo Braves
- Playing career: 1973–1982
- Position: Power forward / center
- Number: 25, 21

Career history
- 1973–1975: San Diego Conquistadors
- 1975–1979: New York/New Jersey Nets
- 1980: San Antonio Spurs
- 1980–1982: Turisanda / Cagiva Varese

Career highlights
- ABA champion (1976); Second-team All-SEC (1973)

Career ABA and NBA statistics
- Points: 2,933 (6.2 ppg)
- Rebounds: 3,148 (6.7 rpg)
- Assists: 576 (1.2 apg)
- Stats at NBA.com
- Stats at Basketball Reference

Eugene Timothy Bassett (April 1, 1951 – December 9, 2018) was an American basketball player. He was a staff member for the charitable group Heroes and Cool Kids.

== Playing career ==
Bassett played for the University of Georgia.

He was selected by the Buffalo Braves in the seventh round (106th pick overall) of the 1973 NBA draft, and by the San Diego Conquistadors in the second round of the 1973 ABA Supplemental Draft.

He played for the San Diego Conquistadors (1973–1975) and New York Nets (1975–1976) in the American Basketball Association (ABA). After the 1976 ABA–NBA merger, he played for the Nets (1976–1979) and the San Antonio Spurs (1979–1980) in the National Basketball Association (NBA) for 473 games.

== Post-playing career ==
Bassett was a staff member for the charitable group Heroes and Cool Kids centered in the New Jersey-New York urban area. The program focuses on spreading positive messages to young students in the fifth and sixth grades and uses high-school students to help carry out its program. Their website specifically states that its goals include spreading skills such as "sportsmanship, conflict resolution, and positive lifestyle choices highlighting drug, alcohol, and tobacco prevention."

Bassett died from cancer on December 9, 2018.

== ABA/NBA career statistics ==
Legend
GP	Games played	GS	Games started	MPG	Minutes per game
FG%	Field goal percentage	3P%	3-point field goal percentage	FT%	Free throw percentage
RPG	Rebounds per game	APG	Assists per game	SPG	Steals per game
BPG	Blocks per game	PPG	Points per game	**Bold**	Career high

†	Denotes season in which Bassett's team won an ABA championship

=== Regular season ===
Year	Team	GP	GS	MPG	FG%	3P%	FT%	RPG	APG	SPG	BPG	PPG
1973–74	San Diego (ABA)	82	–	22.6	.467	.000	.593	7.3	1.3	0.7	0.4	6.9
1974–75	San Diego (ABA)	72	–	27.8	**.471**	**.750**	.562	7.3	**1.6**	0.6	0.5	8.0
1975–76†	New York (ABA)	**84**	–	21.3	.437	.167	.592	6.3	0.8	0.6	0.5	4.8
1976–77	N.Y. Nets	76	–	**32.1**	.396	–	.571	**8.4**	1.4	**1.3**	**0.7**	**9.0**
1977–78	New Jersey	65	–	22.7	.388	–	.515	6.2	1.0	1.0	0.5	5.4
1978–79	New Jersey	82	–	18.4	.371	–	**.679**	5.1	1.2	0.5	0.4	3.9
1979–80	New Jersey	7	–	13.1	.364	–	.667	2.6	0.6	0.7	0.0	3.4
1979–80	San Antonio	5	–	14.4	.333	–	.667	3.0	**2.0**	0.6	0.0	2.0
Career		473	–	23.7	.423	.286	.588	6.7	1.2	0.8	0.5	6.2

=== Playoffs ===
Year	Team	GP	GS	MPG	FG%	3P%	FT%	RPG	APG	SPG	BPG	PPG
1974	San Diego (ABA)	6	–	**40.7**	**.519**	–	.667	**14.8**	**3.3**	**0.5**	**1.2**	**14.7**
1976†	New York (ABA)	**13**	–	24.0	.457	.000	.727	7.2	0.7	**0.5**	0.5	6.3
1979	New Jersey	2	–	8.5	.400	–	**1.000**	1.0	0.0	0.0	0.0	3.0
1980	San Antonio	3	–	6.3	.500	–	–	0.3	0.0	0.0	0.0	0.7
Career		24	–	24.7	.485	.000	.720	7.7	1.2	0.4	0.6	7.4
