= Billy Schaeffer =

American basketball player, small forward

Personal information
- Born: December 11, 1951 (age 74) Bellerose, New York, U.S.
- Listed height: 6 ft 5 in (1.96 m)
- Listed weight: 200 lb (91 kg)

Career information
- High school: Holy Cross (Flushing, New York)
- College: St. John's (1970–1973)
- NBA draft: 1973: 2nd round, 23rd overall pick
- Drafted by: Los Angeles Lakers
- Playing career: 1973–1976
- Position: Small forward
- Number: 15, 24, 11

Career history
- 1973–1976: New York Nets
- 1975: Allentown Jets
- 1976: Virginia Squires

Career highlights
- ABA champion (1974); EPBL champion (1975); Third-team All-American – AP, UPI, NABC (1973); Haggerty Award winner (1973)

Career ABA statistics
- Points: 802 (5.9 ppg)
- Rebounds: 289 (2.1 rpg)
- Assists: 94 (0.7 apg)
- Stats at Basketball Reference

William G. Schaeffer (born December 11, 1951) is an American former basketball in the American Basketball Association (ABA) for the New York Nets and Virginia Squires. He also was a member of the Allentown Jets in the Eastern Pennsylvania Basketball League. He played college basketball for the St. John's Red Storm.

== Early years ==
A native of Bellerose, New York, Schaeffer attended Holy Cross High School in Flushing, New York. As a junior, he led the team to a basketball championship in 1968 (first in school history). As a senior, he was named to the New York City All-Stars team.

== College career ==
Schaeffer stayed in his home state to attend college, accepting a basketball scholarship from St. John's University. In three varsity seasons spanning between 1970–71 and 1972–73, Schaeffer established himself as one of the premier players in program history.

As a sophomore, he struggled with leg injuries, but still managed 14.4 points and 6.3 rebounds per game. He helped the team qualify for the 1971 National Invitation Tournament.

As a junior, he missed the first few games with an illness, but still registered 17.1 points and 6.2 rebounds per game, to go along with a .636 shooting percentage (fifth in the nation). He contributed to the team reaching the 1972 National Invitation Tournament semi-final, losing 67–69 against Niagara University, when his last second shot didn't fall down. He was voted a third team All-American by the Associated Press and United Press International, among other accolades.

As a senior in 1972–73, Schaeffer averaged a still-standing school record 24.7 points per game behind a then-school record .594 shooting percentage. He also led the team to the 1973 NCAA tournament. The Met Basketball Writers Association selected him as the Haggerty Award winner, which is given annually to the best male collegiate basketball player in the New York City metropolitan area. For his college career, Schaeffer accumulated 1,484 points and 622 rebounds.

== Professional career ==
=== New York Nets ===
Schaeffer, a small forward, was selected by the Los Angeles Lakers in the second round (23rd pick overall) of the 1973 NBA draft. Despite being drafted to the NBA, he chose instead to play in the American Basketball Association, which at the time was almost on par with the NBA in terms of popularity.

In his rookie season in 1973–74, he played for the New York Nets who won the ABA championship. Schaeffer played a second full season with the Nets the following year as they failed to defend their title.

=== Allentown Jets ===
In the off season he joined the Allentown Jets in the Eastern Pennsylvania Basketball League. They finished second in the regular season standings but went on to win the EPBL championship, two games to one, over the Hazelton Bullets.

=== Virginia Squires ===
The 1975–76 season would be Schaeffer's last as a professional basketball player. He appeared in 20 regular season games for the New York Nets. On January 7, 1976, he was traded along with Swen Nater to the Virginia Squires, in exchange for Jim Eakins. While playing in 31 games for the Squires, he averaged a career high 6.6 points per game. The Nets would go on to win the 1976 ABA championship at the end of the season. In 137 ABA games played, he scored 802 points and grabbed 289 rebounds.

== See also ==
- List of Los Angeles Lakers first and second round draft picks
