= Kim Hughes (basketball) =

American basketball player and coach (1952–2025)

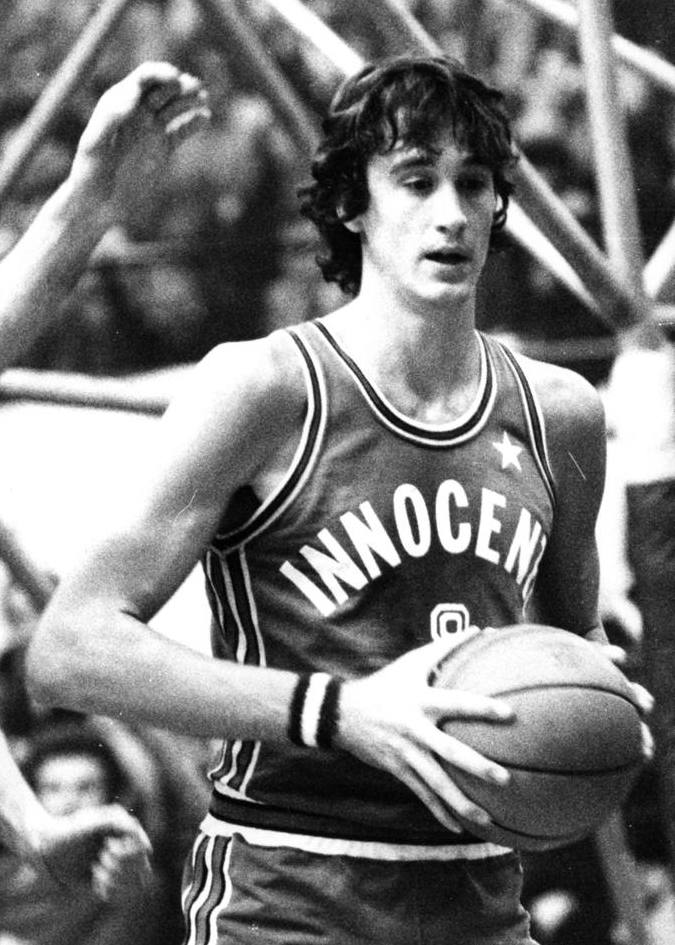
- Hughes with Olimpia Milano in the 1974–75 season

Personal information
- Born: June 4, 1952 Freeport, Illinois, U.S.
- Died: August 29, 2025 (aged 73)
- Listed height: 6 ft 11 in (2.11 m)
- Listed weight: 220 lb (100 kg)

Career information
- High school: Freeport (Freeport, Illinois)
- College: Wisconsin (1971–1974)
- NBA draft: 1974: 3rd round, 45th overall pick
- Drafted by: Buffalo Braves
- Playing career: 1974–1989
- Position: Center
- Number: 35, 12, 44, 3

Career history

Playing
- 1974–1975: Olimpia Milano
- 1975–1978: New York / New Jersey Nets
- 1978–1980: Denver Nuggets
- 1980–1981: Cleveland Cavaliers
- 1981–1983: Virtus Roma
- 1983–1988: Viola Reggio Calabria
- 1988–1989: Basket Brescia

Coaching
- 1998–2003: Denver Nuggets (assistant)
- 2003–2010: Los Angeles Clippers (assistant)
- 2010: Los Angeles Clippers (interim)
- 2012–2015: Portland Trail Blazers (assistant)
- 2015–2016: Viola Reggio Calabria (assistant)

Career highlights
- ABA champion (1976); ABA All-Rookie First Team (1976); Italian Serie A champion (1983)

Career ABA and NBA statistics
- Points: 1,624 (3.8 ppg)
- Rebounds: 2,367 (5.6 rpg)
- Blocks: 502 (1.2 bpg)
- Stats at NBA.com
- Stats at Basketball Reference

Kim Galen Hughes (June 4, 1952 – August 29, 2025) was an American basketball player and coach. He played professional basketball in the American Basketball Association (ABA) and the National Basketball Association (NBA) with the New York / New Jersey Nets, Denver Nuggets and Milwaukee Bucks between 1975 and 1981. Hughes served as the interim head coach for the Los Angeles Clippers for 33 games in 2010. On July 4, 2015, he was fired from his position as an assistant coach with the Portland Trail Blazers.

== Playing career ==
The 6-foot-11 Hughes played college basketball at the University of Wisconsin from 1971 to 1974, averaging 15 points and 11 rebounds as a senior. His identical twin, Kerry, also 6–11, was also a starter on the Badgers. Hughes was selected by the Buffalo Braves in the third round (ninth pick) of the 1974 NBA draft and by the San Antonio Spurs in the 4th round of the 1974 ABA draft. He signed a 3 year contract with the Spurs but refused to report to the Spurs after he claimed that they changed the no-cut clause in his contract to allow the team to cut him before October 31, 1974. Instead he signed a contract to play professionally in Italy for Olimpia Milano, where his twin brother Kerry was also playing. The Spurs initially tried to prevent Hughes from playing in Italy but they eventually reached an agreement where he would play for Olimpia Milano for the 1974-75 season and then join the Spurs the following season. However, he was traded to the New York Nets prior to the 1975-76 season along with forwards Rich Jones and Chuck Terry and guard Bob Warren in exchange for 3-time ABA All-Star center Billy Paultz. He spent the 1975–76 season with the New York Nets of the American Basketball Association (ABA), where he eventually beat out Swen Nater and then Jim Eakins for the starting center role. He averaged eight points and nine rebounds and was named to the First Team ABA All-Rookie Team. The 1976 Nets team, which featured Julius Erving and Brian Taylor, won the ABA championship. Hughes suffered a sprained ankle in game 5 of the finals against the Denver Nuggets which forced him to miss the clinching game 6.

Hughes spent two more seasons with the Nets after the franchise moved to the National Basketball Association (NBA). During the 1976-77 season Hughes became particularly notorious for free throw shooting, possibly exacerbated by an injury suffered when a contact lens was poked into his right eye. By the following season he had also lost confidence in his field goal shooting and his playing time decreased significantly. In July 1978, Hughes signed with the Denver Nuggets, where he played for two full seasons. Eight games into the 1980–81 NBA season, Hughes was traded to the Cleveland Cavaliers. He retired from the NBA at the end of the 1981 season, but continued to play professionally in Italy until 1989. During his ABA and NBA career, Hughes averaged 3.8 points and 5.6 rebounds per game, and had field goal and free throw percentages of 49.7% and 39.7%, respectively.

== Career statistics ==
Legend
GP	Games played	GS	Games started	MPG	Minutes per game
FG%	Field goal percentage	3P%	3-point field goal percentage	FT%	Free throw percentage
RPG	Rebounds per game	APG	Assists per game	SPG	Steals per game
BPG	Blocks per game	PPG	Points per game	**Bold**	Career high
†	Won an NBA championship

=== ABA ===
==== Regular season ====
Year	Team	GP	GS	MPG	FG%	3P%	FT%	RPG	APG	SPG	BPG	PPG
1975–76†	New York	**84**	–	**25.7**	**.530**	.000	**.455**	**9.2**	**0.7**	**1.2**	**1.4**	**8.2**
Career		84	–	25.7	.530	.000	.455	9.2	0.7	1.2	1.4	8.2

==== Playoffs ====
Year	Team	GP	GS	MPG	FG%	3P%	FT%	RPG	APG	SPG	BPG	PPG
1975–76†	New York	**12**	–	**22.2**	**.509**	.000	**.400**	**6.0**	**0.8**	**0.8**	**1.1**	**5.0**
Career		12	–	22.2	.509	.000	.400	6.0	0.8	0.8	1.1	5.0

=== NBA ===
==== Regular season ====
Year	Team	GP	GS	MPG	FG%	3P%	FT%	RPG	APG	SPG	BPG	PPG
1976–77	New York	**81**	–	**25.7**	.427	–	.275	**7.0**	1.2	**1.5**	1.5	**4.0**
1977–78	New Jersey	56	–	15.3	.356	–	.310	4.3	0.7	0.9	0.9	2.2
1978–79	Denver	**81**	–	13.4	**.538**	–	.400	4.1	0.9	0.7	1.3	2.6
1979–80	Denver	70	–	17.3	.505	.000	.366	4.7	1.1	0.9	1.1	3.1
1980–81	Denver	8	–	19.9	.440	.000	**.500**	6.3	**1.4**	1.4	**1.8**	2.9
1980–81	Cleveland	45	–	7.4	.356	.000	.000	1.7	0.5	0.4	0.5	0.7
Career		341	–	16.8	.449	.000	.333	4.7	0.9	0.9	1.1	2.7

==== Playoffs ====
Year	Team	GP	GS	MPG	FG%	3P%	FT%	RPG	APG	SPG	BPG	PPG
1978–79	Denver	**3**	–	**11.7**	**.500**	–	**.500**	**3.7**	0.0	**0.7**	0.0	**1.0**
Career		3	–	11.7	.500	–	.500	3.7	0.0	0.7	0.0	1.0

== Coaching career ==
Hughes worked as a scout and assistant coach with the NBA's Denver Nuggets, Milwaukee Bucks, Los Angeles Clippers and Portland Trail Blazers.

In 2004, Hughes was diagnosed with prostate cancer, but the Clippers and Donald Sterling refused to cover the cost of his surgery. Several Clippers players, including Corey Maggette, Chris Kaman, Marko Jarić and Elton Brand, chipped in to pay for Hughes' treatment. It turned out that the cancer was more advanced than previously thought and about to metastasize. The cost of the surgery was estimated by Hughes to be at least $70,000.

On February 4, 2010, Hughes replaced Mike Dunleavy Sr. as the head coach of the Los Angeles Clippers. On April 15, 2010, Hughes was released from his duties as interim head coach after going 8–25. On August 17, 2012, Hughes was named as an assistant coach for the Portland Trail Blazers. On July 4, 2015, it was reported that Kim Hughes was relieved of his duties as assistant coach of the Trail Blazers due to circumstances related to media statements and free agency.

== Head coaching record ==
Legend
Regular season	G	Games coached	W	Games won	L	Games lost	W–L %	Win–loss %
Playoffs	PG	Playoff games	PW	Playoff wins	PL	Playoff losses	PW–L %	Playoff win–loss %

Team	Year	G	W	L	W–L%	Finish	PG	PW	PL	PW–L%	Result
L.A. Clippers	2009–10	33	8	25	.242	3rd in Pacific	—	—	—	—	Missed playoffs
Career		33	8	25	.242		—	—	—	—	

== Death ==
Hughes died on August 29, 2025, at the age of 73.
