= George Bucci =

American basketball player

Personal information
- Born: July 9, 1953 (age 73) Cornwall, New York, U.S.
- Listed height: 6 ft 3 in (1.91 m)
- Listed weight: 200 lb (91 kg)

Career information
- High school: Newburgh Free Academy (Newburgh, New York)
- College: Manhattan (1972–1975)
- NBA draft: 1975: 3rd round, 52nd overall pick
- Drafted by: Buffalo Braves
- Playing career: 1975–1992
- Position: Shooting guard
- Number: 11

Career history
- 1975–1976: New York Nets
- 1977–1980: Mens Sana Siena
- 1981–1984: Mens Sana Siena
- 1984–1985: Ellepi Irnerio
- 1985–1990: Fortitudo Bologna
- 1990–1991: Montecatini SC
- 1991–1992: Mens Sana Siena

Career highlights
- ABA champion (1976)
- Stats at Basketball Reference

George P. Bucci Jr. (born July 9, 1953) is an American former basketball player.

He played collegiately for the Manhattan College.

He was selected by the Buffalo Braves in the third round (52nd pick overall) of the 1975 NBA draft and by the New York Nets in the 1975 ABA Draft.

He played for the New York Nets in the American Basketball Association (ABA) during the 1975–76 season and won an ABA championship with them. He was not used much as their 5th guard, and during the season the team permitted him to start an oil distribution company.

The Net's cut Bucci before the 1976–77 season. From 1977 until 1992 he played in the Lega Basket Serie A

In the 1990s he was elected to political office, as councilman and later supervisor of Newburgh, New York.

In 2018, Bucci was inducted into MAAC Honor Roll.
