= Bobby Leonard =

American basketball player and coach (1932–2021)

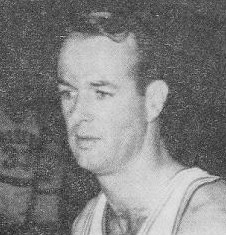
- Leonard, circa 1962

Personal information
- Born: July 17, 1932 Terre Haute, Indiana, U.S.
- Died: April 13, 2021 (aged 88) Indianapolis, Indiana, U.S.
- Listed height: 6 ft 3 in (1.91 m)
- Listed weight: 185 lb (84 kg)

Career information
- High school: Gerstmeyer (Terre Haute, Indiana)
- College: Indiana (1951–1954)
- NBA draft: 1954: 2nd round, 10th overall pick
- Drafted by: Baltimore Bullets
- Playing career: 1956–1963
- Position: Point guard
- Number: 21
- Coaching career: 1962–1964, 1968–1980

Career history

Playing
- 1956–1961: Minneapolis / Los Angeles Lakers
- 1961–1963: Chicago Packers / Zephyrs

Coaching
- 1962–1964: Chicago Zephyrs / Baltimore Bullets
- 1968–1980: Indiana Pacers

Career highlights
- As player: NCAA champion (1953); Consensus second-team All-American (1954); Third-team All-American – AP (1953); As coach: 3× ABA champion (1970, 1972, 1973); No. 529 honored by Indiana Pacers; ABA All-Star Game head coach (1970); ABA All-time Best Head Coach

Career playing statistics
- Points: 4,204 (9.9 ppg)
- Rebounds: 1,217 (2.9 rpg)
- Assists: 1,427 (3.3 apg)
- Stats at NBA.com
- Stats at Basketball Reference

Career coaching record
- NBA & ABA: 573–534 (.518)
- Record at Basketball Reference
- Basketball Hall of Fame

William Robert "Slick" Leonard (July 17, 1932 – April 13, 2021) was an American professional basketball player, coach and color commentator. He played college basketball for the Indiana Hoosiers, where he was a two-time All-American and a member of their national championship squad in 1953. After playing professionally in the National Basketball Association (NBA), Leonard coached the Indiana Pacers to three American Basketball Association (ABA) championships. He was inducted into the Naismith Memorial Basketball Hall of Fame as a coach in 2014.

== Early life ==
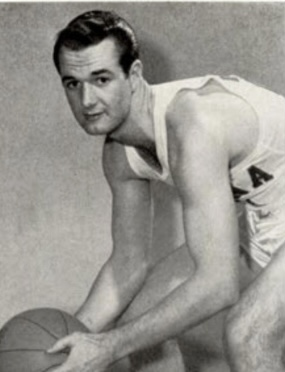
Leonard as a senior at IU

Leonard was born in Terre Haute, Indiana, on July 17, 1932. He attended Gerstmeyer High School. He was shaped by the basketball games played in his neighborhood that saw him toughen up. There, he played high school basketball as a 6 ft 3 in (1.91 m), 185 lb (84 kg) guard, and also excelled as a tennis player. He went on to play collegiate basketball at Indiana University Bloomington, where he hit the game winning free throw to give the Hoosiers the 1953 NCAA championship. While at Indiana, he became a member of Delta Tau Delta International fraternity. He was named a third-team All-American in 1953 and selected to the second team the following season.

== Professional career ==
=== Playing career ===
Leonard was selected by the Baltimore Bullets with the first pick of the second round (tenth overall) of the 1954 NBA draft. He spent most of his seven-year professional playing career with the Lakers (four years in Minneapolis, and one year following the team's move to Los Angeles), followed by two years with the Chicago Packers/Zephyrs). He led the NBA in games played (72) in 1956–57. His best season came in 1961–62, in which he finished sixth in the NBA in assists per game (5.4) and eighth in assists (378). In his final season as a player, he also coached the Zephyrs. The team moved to Baltimore the following year; Leonard coached them for one more year.

It was during a game of gin rummy with George Mikan where Leonard earned the nickname "Slick", as Mikan described him as such after Leonard beat him at the game.

=== Coaching career with the Pacers ===
Leonard quit the Bullets when they refused to give him a multiyear contract. By 1968, he was selling class rings and yearbooks for a living. Five years after coaching the Bullets, Leonard became the coach of the ABA's Indiana Pacers, a position he held for nearly 12 years – the last four after the franchise moved to the NBA.

Leonard arrived to the team nine games into the 1968–69 season. According to Bob Netolicky, in the first meeting with the team after his hiring, Leonard stated that the team would learn basketball all over again in the way it "should be played" while stating his clear interest in making the team a "family" that would stick together, win or lose, which even extended to wanting the team to get together for a drink after every game. No player was immune to Leonard's demand for "48 minutes of total effort during the game". So committed was Leonard that he told Roger Brown he would leave him home rather than have him on an upcoming road trip if he did not give 100 percent in practice. When Brown thought he was bluffing, Leonard stayed true to his word and left him at home, which motivated Brown to play better.

Composed of a fiery temper that led to his team being ready to fight (including the coach himself), the Pacers went 42–27 in his first season as a coach and made it to the ABA playoffs. In their first-round matchup against Kentucky, they lost three of the first four games, but it did not worry Leonard, who gave a mellow speech prior to Game 5 about all he wanted was for them to give 100 percent and play their game without yelling; the Pacers proceeded to win Games 5, 6, and 7 to win the series. They made it all the way to the ABA Finals, losing to the Oakland Oaks.

In the book Loose Balls, Leonard adamantly believed the best teams were ones that were physically and mentally tough together full of belief of oneself while stating that his job was "to keep the team together" as opposed to calling the game complicated. This extended to bringing the team to hospitals with sick children to remind the players of "what real life can be about." The 1969–70 team aspired to avenge their loss the previous year. The proceeded to have the best record in the league and had home-field advantage before smashing Carolina and Kentucky with only one total loss before meeting the Los Angeles Stars. The Pacers won the first two games before Los Angeles won Game 3 and Indiana roared to a Game 4 victory by 22 points. They lost Game 5 in overtime before going to Los Angeles and winning it in resounding fashion to deliver the first professional championship for Indiana.

In total, the Pacers advanced to the ABA Finals five times and won three ABA championships prior to the ABA–NBA merger in June 1976; in eight playoff series with a Game 7, Leonard won six of them. From 1976 to 1980, Leonard also served as general manager, where he worked in tandem with his wife Nancy, who handled the administrative duties as assistant general manager. However, the Pacers were nearly gutted in order to meet the financial burdens imposed by the merger, and he was never able to put together a winning team during the Pacers' first four years as an NBA team. By 1977, the team was on the brink of leaving Indianapolis and to sell 8,000 season tickets to raise $2 million. It was Nancy Leonard who came up with the idea for a telethon that she and Bobby would participate in; the "Save the Pacers" telethon, broadcast on live television on July 3, was successful.

=== Color commentary ===
Leonard returned to the Pacers in 1985 as a color commentator, first for television with Jerry Baker, then on radio with Mark Boyle on WIBC 1070 AM. His trademark phrase is "Boom, baby!" for a successful three-point field goal by a Pacers player. Leonard first said the phrase in the aftermath of a playoff game where Billy Keller drained a three-point shot to win the game for Indiana.

== Later life ==
Leonard suffered a heart attack on March 13, 2011, shortly after a Pacers' road victory over the New York Knicks. He was later said to be in good condition, but was given an indefinite time to recover, and was filled in for by Pacers TV analyst and former player Austin Croshere.

Leonard was inducted into the Naismith Memorial Basketball Hall of Fame as a coach in 2014. He became the first individual to be inducted into the Indiana University Sports Hall of Fame. He was also a member of the Indiana Basketball Hall of Fame and Indiana Sports Writers and Broadcasters Hall of Fame.

Leonard sustained three falls in 2018. The first in January shattered his left hip, while the second in June resulted in a broken left wrist. After his third fall in late December, he took a hiatus from calling games, before coming back on February 28, 2019. He died on April 13, 2021, at the age of 88.

== Personal life ==
Leonard met his wife Nancy (a native of South Bend, Indiana) during his time in college. They met when Leonard tripped her when she strolled past him in health class. Four years later, on the day after they graduated from Indiana, the two married each other. They wound up having five children together over a marriage of 60 years. Nancy Leonard died on September 23, 2025, at age 93.

== Career playing statistics ==
Legend
| GP | Games played | GS | Games started | MPG | Minutes per game |
| FG% | Field goal percentage | 3P% | 3-point field goal percentage | FT% | Free throw percentage |
| RPG | Rebounds per game | APG | Assists per game | SPG | Steals per game |
| BPG | Blocks per game | PPG | Points per game | **Bold** | Career high |
| * | Led the league |

=== NBA ===
==== Regular season ====
| Year | Team | GP | MPG | FG% | FT% | RPG | APG | PPG |
|---|---|---|---|---|---|---|---|---|
| 1956–57 | Minneapolis | 72* | 27.0 | .349 | **.772** | 3.1 | 2.3 | 11.0 |
| 1957–58 | Minneapolis | 66 | 31.4 | .335 | .765 | **3.6** | 3.3 | 11.2 |
| 1958–59 | Minneapolis | 58 | 27.6 | .373 | .750 | 3.1 | 3.2 | 9.2 |
| 1959–60 | Minneapolis | **73** | 28.4 | .322 | .705 | 3.4 | 3.5 | 8.2 |
| 1960–61 | L.A. Lakers | 55 | 10.9 | .295 | .710 | 1.3 | 1.5 | 3.5 |
| 1961–62 | Chicago | 70 | **35.2** | **.375** | .752 | 2.8 | **5.4** | **16.1** |
| 1962–63 | Chicago | 32 | 27.5 | .343 | .694 | 2.1 | 4.5 | 7.1 |
| Career | | 426 | 27.3 | .349 | .745 | 2.9 | 3.3 | 9.9 |

==== Playoffs ====
| Year | Team | GP | MPG | FG% | FT% | RPG | APG | PPG |
|---|---|---|---|---|---|---|---|---|
| 1957 | Minneapolis | 5 | **40.8** | **.420** | **.885** | **6.0** | **7.6** | **21.4** |
| 1959 | Minneapolis | **13*** | 35.9 | .364 | .800 | 3.4 | 5.4 | 12.2 |
| 1960 | Minneapolis | 9 | 23.0 | .299 | .643 | 1.1 | 5.0 | 6.4 |
| 1961 | L.A. Lakers | 7 | 6.6 | .208 | .250 | .9 | 1.7 | 1.6 |
| Career | | 34 | 27.2 | .357 | .755 | 2.6 | 4.9 | 9.8 |

== Head coaching record ==
| * | Record |

Legend
| Regular season | G | Games coached | W | Games won | L | Games lost | W–L % | Win–loss % |
| Playoffs | PG | Playoff games | PW | Playoff wins | PL | Playoff losses | PW–L % | Playoff win–loss % |

| Team | Year | G | W | L | W–L% | Finish | PG | PW | PL | PW–L% | Result |
|---|---|---|---|---|---|---|---|---|---|---|---|
| Chicago | 1962–63 | 42 | 13 | 29 | .310 | 5th in Western | — | — | — | — | Missed playoffs |
| Baltimore | 1963–64 | 80 | 31 | 49 | .388 | 4th in Western | — | — | — | — | Missed playoffs |
| Indiana | 1968–69 | 69 | 42 | 27 | .609 | 1st in Eastern | 17 | 9 | 8 | .529 | Lost in ABA Finals |
| Indiana | 1969–70 | 84 | 59 | 25 | .702 | 1st in Eastern | 15 | 12 | 3 | .800 | Won ABA Championship |
| Indiana | 1970–71 | 84 | 58 | 26 | .690 | 1st in Western | 11 | 7 | 4 | .636 | Lost in Division finals |
| Indiana | 1971–72 | 84 | 47 | 37 | .560 | 2nd in Western | 20* | 12 | 8 | .600 | Won ABA Championship |
| Indiana | 1972–73 | 84 | 51 | 33 | .607 | 2nd in Western | 11 | 12 | 6 | .667 | Won ABA Championship |
| Indiana | 1973–74 | 84 | 46 | 38 | .548 | 2nd in Western | 14 | 7 | 7 | .500 | Lost in Division finals |
| Indiana | 1974–75 | 84 | 45 | 39 | .536 | 3rd in Western | 16 | 9 | 9 | .500 | Lost in ABA Finals |
| Indiana | 1975–76 | 84 | 39 | 45 | .464 | 5th in ABA | 3 | 1 | 2 | .333 | Lost in first round |
| Indiana | 1976–77 | 82 | 36 | 46 | .439 | 5th in Midwest | — | — | — | — | Missed playoffs |
| Indiana | 1977–78 | 82 | 31 | 51 | .378 | 5th in Midwest | — | — | — | — | Missed playoffs |
| Indiana | 1978–79 | 82 | 38 | 44 | .463 | 3rd in Midwest | — | — | — | — | Missed playoffs |
| Indiana | 1979–80 | 82 | 37 | 45 | .451 | 4th in Central | — | — | — | — | Missed playoffs |
| Career ABA | | 657* | 387* | 270 | .589 | | 116* | 69* | 47 | .595 | |
| Career NBA | | 450 | 186 | 264 | .413 | | | | | – | |
| Career Total | | 1,107 | 573 | 534 | .518 | | 116 | 69 | 47 | .595 | |
