= 1973–74 New York Nets season =

ABA professional basketball team season

- ABA champions
- Division champions
- Head coach: Kevin Loughery
- Arena: Nassau Veterans Memorial Coliseum

Results
- Record: 55–29 (.655)
- Place: Division: 1st (Eastern (ABA))
- Playoff finish: ABA champions (defeated Stars 4–1)
- Stats at Basketball Reference

Local media
- Television: WOR
- Radio: WHN

The 1973–74 New York Nets season was the seventh season in the American Basketball Association for the New York Nets basketball franchise, which includes their first season where they played as the New Jersey Americans before moving to Long Island to become the Nets ever since then. This season would also be the season where the team finally acquired small forward Julius Erving in a trade with the Virginia Squires after being the only other team alongside the Squires to showcase genuine interest in obtaining him after the 1971 ABA draft officially ended, despite him being a junior at the time he first signed up to play for the ABA. While the Squires never made it to the ABA Finals with Erving playing for him (which included Erving losing to the Nets while playing with Virginia in the Eastern Division Finals in his rookie season), Dr. J would prove to be the missing piece necessary for them to become one of the best teams in the ABA's final years of existence. With Erving playing alongside some of their other star-caliber players on the roster, the Nets won their first ABA Championship by first beating Dr. J's former team, the Squires, 4–1 and then swept the Kentucky Colonels before beating the Utah Stars 4–1 in the championship series.

== ABA Draft ==
Interestingly, this year's ABA draft would involve four different types of drafts throughout the early 1973 year: a "Special Circumstances Draft" on January 15, a "Senior Draft" on April 25, an "Undergraduate Draft" also on April 25, and a "Supplemental Draft" on May 18, though the Nets joined the Indiana Pacers as one of two teams to avoid using that last draft entirely. Still, the following selections were made in these respective drafts by the Nets.

=== ABA Special Circumstances Draft ===
Round	Pick	Player	Position	Nationality	College
1	5	Jim Brewer	PF	United States	Minnesota
2	15	Billy Schaeffer	SF	United States	St. John's

=== ABA Senior Draft ===
Round	Pick	Player	Position(s)	Nationality	College
1	4	Doug Collins	SG	United States	Illinois State
3	24	James Lister	C	United States	Sam Houston State
4	32	Phil Hankinson	PF	United States	Pennsylvania
4	34	Kermit Washington	PF	United States	American
5	44	Ken Brady	C	United States	Michigan
6	54	Neal Jurgensen	F	United States	Oregon State
7	64	Nate Stephens	C	United States	Long Beach State
8	74	Gene Doyle	F	United States	Holy Cross
9	84	Clinton Harris	F	United States	Iowa State
10	94	Gene Armstead	PF/C	United States	Rutgers

The "Senior Draft" done in April is often considered the official, main draft period of the 1973 ABA draft by basketball historians.

=== ABA Undergraduate Draft ===
Round	Pick	Player	Position(s)	Nationality	College
11 (1)	104 (4)	Henry Williams	F	United States	Jacksonville
12 (2)	114 (14)	Campy Russell	SF	United States	Michigan

The "Undergraduate Draft" is considered a continuation of the "Senior Draft" that was done earlier that same day, hence the numbering of the rounds and draft picks here. Also, the Nets joined the Indiana Pacers as one of only two teams to decline participation in the "Supplementary Draft" entirely, meaning there will be no section for that draft with the Nets here.

== Exhibition Games ==
On September 18, 1973, the Nets opened the ABA vs. NBA exhibition season against the NBA's Philadelphia 76ers. Playing in Binghamton, New York, the Nets beat the 76ers 94–88. On September 28 the Nets again faced the 76ers, this time in Trenton, New Jersey. The Nets also won this matchup, 118–100.

On September 29, in White Plains, New York, the Nets faced the Washington Bullets. Julius Erving scored a game-high 42 points as the Nets won 127–121.

On October 2, 17,226 fans showed up at Madison Square Garden to watch the Nets play the New York Knicks. Erving scored 27 points, 12 of them in the third quarter, as the Nets won 97–87.

On October 7 the Nets took their 4–0 streak against NBA teams into a contest with the Boston Celtics in Uniondale, New York. Erving scored 23 points, but John Havlicek scored 37 for Boston as the Celtics won, 121–102.

== Roster ==
1973–74 New York Nets roster
Players

Pos.	No.	Player	Height	Weight	DOB	From
SF	32	Julius Erving	6 ft 7 in (2.01 m)	210 lb (95 kg)	1950-02-22	UMass
PG	12	Mike Gale	6 ft 4 in (1.93 m)	185 lb (84 kg)	1950-07-18	Elizabeth City State
SF	44	Gary Gregor	6 ft 7 in (2.01 m)	225 lb (102 kg)	1945-08-13	South Carolina
PF	35	Larry Kenon	6 ft 9 in (2.06 m)	205 lb (93 kg)	1952-12-13	Memphis
SG	30	Bob Lackey	6 ft 5 in (1.96 m)	200 lb (91 kg)	1949-04-04	Marquette
SF	4	Wendell Ladner	6 ft 5 in (1.96 m)	220 lb (100 kg)	1948-10-06	Southern Miss
PG	25	Bill Melchionni	6 ft 1 in (1.85 m)	165 lb (75 kg)	1944-10-19	Villanova
SF	44	Jim O'Brien	6 ft 7 in (2.01 m)	200 lb (91 kg)	1951-11-07	Maryland
C	5	Billy Paultz	6 ft 11 in (2.11 m)	235 lb (107 kg)	1948-07-30	St. John's
SG	22	Rich Rinaldi	6 ft 3 in (1.91 m)	195 lb (88 kg)	1949-08-03	Saint Peter's
SG	13	John Roche	6 ft 3 in (1.91 m)	170 lb (77 kg)	1949-09-26	South Carolina
SF	15	Billy Schaeffer	6 ft 5 in (1.96 m)	200 lb (91 kg)	1951-12-11	St. John's
C	40	Willie Sojourner	6 ft 8 in (2.03 m)	225 lb (102 kg)	1948-09-10	Weber State
PG	14	Brian Taylor	6 ft 2 in (1.88 m)	185 lb (84 kg)	1951-06-09	Princeton
SG	22	Ollie Taylor	6 ft 2 in (1.88 m)	194 lb (88 kg)	1947-03-07	Houston
SG	23	John Williamson	6 ft 2 in (1.88 m)	185 lb (84 kg)	1951-11-10	New Mexico State

Coaches
Head coach
- Kevin Loughery

Legend
- (DP) Unsigned draft pick
- (FA) Free agent
- (S) Suspended
- Injured

Roster

== Regular season ==
=== Season standings ===
Eastern Division
Team	W	L	PCT	GB
New York Nets	55	29	.655	–
Kentucky Colonels	53	31	.631	2
Carolina Cougars	47	37	.560	8
Virginia Squires	28	56	.333	27
Memphis Tams	21	63	.250	34

=== ABA Schedule ===
Game	Date	Opponent	Result	Nets points	Opponents	Record	Streak	Notes
1	October 10	Indiana Pacers	Loss	99	118	0–1	Lost 1	
2	October 12	Virginia Squires	Win	116	105	1–1	Won 1	

== Player stats ==
Note: GP= Games played; MIN= Minutes; STL= Steals; REB = Rebounds; ASST = Assists; BLK = Blocks; PTS = Points

Player	GP	MIN	STL	REB	ASST	BLK	PTS
Julius Erving	84	3398	190	899	434	204	2299
Larry Kenon	84	2908	79	962	112	19	1334
Billy Paultz	77	2596	60	782	167	147	1260
John Williamson	77	2264	86	213	243	27	1116
Brian Taylor	75	2505	154	214	341	22	834
John Roche	50	1254	41	59	208	6	570
Willard Sojourner	82	1316	24	335	54	88	458
Billy Schaeffer	59	871	24	141	37	9	385
Bill Melchionni	56	1146	51	77	207	5	296
Mike Gale	32	904	60	152	124	34	257
Wendell Ladner	30	637	46	161	65	3	203
Gary Gregor	25	313	4	71	15	1	91
Jim O'Brien	11	54	3	17	6	3	39
Oliver Taylor	8	76	3	14	10	0	28
Rich Rinaldi	5	28	2	5	1	0	12
Bob Lackey	3	15	1	4	1	0	6

== ABA Playoffs ==
ABA Eastern Division Semifinals vs. Virginia Squires

Game	Date	Location	Score	Record	Attendance
1	April 29	New York	108–96	1–0	9,784
2	April 1	New York	129–110	2–0	10,747
3	April 4	Hampton (Virginia)	115–116	2–1	2,544
4	April 7	Norfolk (Virginia)	116–88	3–1	4,220
5	April 8	New York	108–96	4–1	1,1903

Nets win series, 4–1

ABA Eastern Division Finals vs Kentucky Colonels

Game	Date	Location	Score	Record	Attendance
1	April 13	New York	119–96	1–0	12,817
2	April 15	New York	99–80	2–0	13,726
3	April 17	Kentucky	89–87	3–0	13,797
4	April 20	Kentucky	103–90	4–0	7,800

Nets win series, 4–0

ABA Finals vs. Utah Stars

Game	Date	Location	Score	Record	Attendance
1	April 30	New York	89–85	1–0	13,740
2	May 4	New York	118–94	2–0	15,934
3	May 6	Utah	103–100	3–0	10,743
4	May 8	Utah	89–97	3–1	10,254
5	May 10	New York	111–100	4–1	15,934

Nets win championship series, 4–1

== Transactions ==
=== Draft and other non-trade signings ===
- Special circumstance draft pick Jim Brewer signs with Cleveland Cavaliers of the NBA
- Undergraduate draft pick Campy Russell stays in college
- Head coach Lou Carnesecca returns to St. John's University
- Kevin Loughery becomes head coach
- Draft pick Doug Collins signs with Philadelphia 76ers of the NBA
- Draft pick Kermit Washington signs with Los Angeles Lakers of the NBA
- William M. Skehan is named Executive Vice President

=== Trades ===
- August 1, 1973: George Carter and ABA rights to Kermit Washington and $750,000 traded to the Virginia Squires for Julius Erving and Willie Sojourner
- September 20, 1973: Jim Ard and John Baum traded to the Memphis Tams for the rights to Larry Kenon
- January 24, 1974: John Roche traded to the Kentucky Colonels for Mike Gale and Wendell Ladner

== Awards, Records and Honors ==
- Julius Erving, ABA MVP
- Julius Erving, Finals MVP
- Julius Erving, All-Star Team, East Division
- Larry Kenon, All-Star Team, East Division
- Billy Paultz, All-Star Team, East Division (missed game due to injury)
- Julius Erving, All-ABA Team, 1st Team
- Larry Kenon, ABA All-Rookie Team
- John Williamson, ABA All-Rookie Team
- Mike Gale, ABA All-Defensive Team
