= John Williamson (basketball, born 1951) =

American basketball player (1951–1996)

Personal information
- Born: November 10, 1951 New Haven, Connecticut, U.S.
- Died: November 30, 1996 (aged 45) New Haven, Connecticut, U.S.
- Listed height: 6 ft 2 in (1.88 m)
- Listed weight: 185 lb (84 kg)

Career information
- High school: Wilbur Cross (New Haven, Connecticut)
- College: New Mexico State (1971–1973)
- NBA draft: 1973: 6th round, 96th overall pick
- Drafted by: Atlanta Hawks
- Playing career: 1973–1982
- Position: Shooting guard
- Number: 23

Career history
- 1973–1977: New York Nets
- 1977–1978: Indiana Pacers
- 1978–1980: New Jersey Nets
- 1980: Washington Bullets
- 1982: Las Vegas Silvers

Career highlights
- 2× ABA champion (1974, 1976); ABA All-Rookie First Team (1974); No. 23 retired by Brooklyn Nets; First-team Parade All-American (1970)

Career ABA and NBA statistics
- Points: 9,017 (17.5 ppg)
- Rebounds: 1,274 (2.5 rpg)
- Assists: 1,441 (2.8 apg)
- Stats at NBA.com
- Stats at Basketball Reference

John Lee Williamson (November 10, 1951 – November 30, 1996) was an American basketball player. He helped the New York Nets win two league championships in the American Basketball Association (ABA) in the 1970s.

Williamson played high school basketball at Wilbur Cross High School in New Haven, Connecticut and played college basketball for the New Mexico State Aggies. He was a 6'2" guard. He was nicknamed "Super John" for his highly efficient jump shooting.

== High school career ==
While at Wilbur Cross High School, Williamson played on the Connecticut state champion teams of 1966–67 and 1967–68. In the 1968 title game, Cross won over Bridgeport Central, 123–82. Williamson's teammates, Alex Scott (24 points), and Clint Davis (40 points) led the way in the romp for Cross's third consecutive title. Williamson contributed 17 points, which was his average that year.

In 1969, Cross was runner up to crosstown rival Hillhouse in 1968–69, losing 76–71 in the final. For Williamson's senior (1969–70) year, he led the nation in scoring, averaging 38.7 points per game. His team was upset in a semi-final match, once again playing Bridgeport Central, with an ending score of 105–103.

== College career ==
Williamson went on to team up with Scott and Davis at New Mexico State University, where he averaged 27 points per game within 2 years.

== Professional career ==
As a rookie, Williamson landed a roster spot with the New York Nets of the ABA as a free agent for the 1973–74 season. Before signing with the ABA Nets, he had been eligible for the NBA draft that year, being selected by the Atlanta Hawks in the 6th round with the 96th pick, but didn't make the cut for their roster. Despite being a rookie, Williamson quickly entered the New York starting lineup along with superstar Julius Erving and rising star rookie Larry Kenon (who would get traded a couple of years later). After Williamson became a starter, the team's fortunes quickly turned for the better and the team ended up winning the ABA Championship that season. Williamson was named to the 1974 ABA All-Rookie team.

Continuing with the Nets, Williamson, in Game 6 of the 1976 ABA Finals, scored 28 points with 16 of them coming in the fourth quarter. He and Erving carried the team's offense, combining for 59 points (31 of them from Erving) and leading the Nets to come back from 22 points behind to win the game, the series and the ABA championship.

In the 1976–77 season, Williamson was traded to the Indiana Pacers midseason; in the middle of the next season, he was traded back to the Nets. The Nets would make the playoffs in 1978–79 with Williamson scoring a then-record 38 points for an NBA playoff debut. The Nets would however lose 0–2 in the series to the Philadelphia 76ers. In the 1979–80 season he was traded from the Nets to the Washington Bullets who would be the last team he played for before the end of his NBA career until the 1980–81 season. By this time Williamson had largely declined as a player despite being only 29 years old and wouldn't return to the NBA after that season due to contract disagreements in free agency and not maintaining a healthy weight to play.

In 1982, he would play for the CBA Las Vegas Silvers in an attempt to get recruited back into the NBA but never received any offers.

In his ABA/NBA career, Williamson scored 9,017 points. He averaged between 11.5 and 29.5 points in every ABA/NBA season except for his last.

Williamson still holds Nets team records in various categories, including most free throw attempts in a game, with 24 (since tied by Vince Carter and Devin Harris).

Williamson's jersey number (23) was retired by the New York/New Jersey Nets franchise on December 7, 1990; Williamson is one of three players who were with the Nets during their ABA days with a retired number; the other two are Bill Melchionni and Julius Erving.

== Personal life ==
After professional basketball, Williamson would end up working in a juvenile detention center back in his hometown of New Haven, Connecticut.

At age 45, Williamson died of kidney failure related to diabetes on November 30, 1996. He was survived by his wife Bertha Williamson and his four children.

== ABA and NBA career statistics ==
Legend
GP	Games played	GS	Games started	MPG	Minutes per game
FG%	Field goal percentage	3P%	3-point field goal percentage	FT%	Free throw percentage
RPG	Rebounds per game	APG	Assists per game	SPG	Steals per game
BPG	Blocks per game	PPG	Points per game	**Bold**	Career high

†	Denotes seasons in which Williamson's team won an ABA championship
**Bold**	Career high

=== Regular season ===
Year	Team	GP	GS	MPG	FG%	3P%	FT%	RPG	APG	SPG	BPG	PPG
1973–74†	New York (ABA)	**77**	—	29.4	**.491**	.182	.789	2.8	3.2	1.1	**.4**	14.5
1974–75	New York (ABA)	75	—	25.0	.482	.231	.837	2.0	2.6	.8	.3	11.5
1975–76†	New York (ABA)	76	—	29.7	.450	.190	.806	2.5	2.5	1.0	**.4**	16.2
1976–77	New York Nets	42	—	**40.5**	.445	—	.789	2.8	2.1	1.4	.1	20.8
1976–77	Indiana	30	—	38.6	.480	—	.784	2.5	**3.7**	**1.6**	.2	20.7
1977–78	Indiana	42	—	34.5	.421	—	.832	2.9	3.1	1.1	.0	19.1
1977–78	New Jersey	33	—	38.8	.454	—	.857	**3.2**	2.5	1.4	.3	**29.5**
1978–79	New Jersey	74	—	35.9	.465	—	.854	2.6	3.4	1.2	.2	22.2
1979–80	New Jersey	28	—	27.5	.447	**.421**	**.864**	1.9	3.1	.9	.3	17.7
1979–80	Washington	30	—	20.1	.430	.188	.800	1.5	1.3	.3	.3	11.6
1980–81	Washington	9	—	12.4	.321	.167	.833	.8	1.9	.4	.1	4.7
Career		516	—	30.1	.458	.234	.826	2.5	2.8	1.1	.3	17.5

=== Playoffs ===
Year	Team	GP	GS	MPG	FG%	3P%	FT%	RPG	APG	SPG	BPG	PPG
1974†	New York (ABA)	**14**	—	30.4	.450	.000	.815	**3.3**	2.9	.7	.4	11.9
1975	New York (ABA)	5	—	23.6	**.605**	.000	.615	2.0	2.0	.2	**.6**	12.0
1976†	New York (ABA)	10	—	36.0	.497	**.333**	.696	2.4	2.6	1.0	.3	22.2
1979	New Jersey	2	—	**46.0**	.371	—	.813	3.0	**4.0**	**2.0**	.0	**29.5**
1980	Washington	2	—	15.5	.579	**.333**	**1.000**	1.0	.5	.0	.0	13.5
Career		33	—	31.1	.478	.250	.743	2.7	2.6	.8	.4	16.2
