= Ted McClain =

American basketball player (born 1946)

Personal information
- Born: August 30, 1946 (age 80) Nashville, Tennessee, U.S.
- Listed height: 6 ft 1 in (1.85 m)
- Listed weight: 180 lb (82 kg)

Career information
- High school: Pearl (Nashville, Tennessee)
- College: Tennessee State (1967–1971)
- NBA draft: 1971: 2nd round, 22nd overall pick
- Drafted by: Atlanta Hawks
- Playing career: 1971–1979
- Position: Point guard / shooting guard
- Number: 24, 12

Career history
- 1971–1974: Carolina Cougars
- 1974–1976: Kentucky Colonels
- 1976: New York Nets
- 1976–1977: Denver Nuggets
- 1977–1978: Buffalo Braves
- 1978: Philadelphia 76ers
- 1979: Phoenix Suns

Career highlights
- 2× ABA champion (1975–1976); ABA All-Star (1974); ABA All-Defensive First Team (1974); ABA steals leader (1974)

Career ABA and NBA statistics
- Points: 4,669 (8.4 ppg)
- Rebounds: 1,627 (2.9 rpg)
- Assists: 1,909 (3.4 apg)
- Stats at NBA.com
- Stats at Basketball Reference

Theodore McClain (born August 30, 1946) is an American former professional basketball player. A 6'1", 180 lb (82 kg) guard from Tennessee State University, McClain played eight seasons (1971–1979) of professional basketball in the American Basketball Association (ABA) and National Basketball Association (NBA).

While in college McClain was named the Most Outstanding Player of the 1970 NCAA College Division basketball tournament in which Tennessee State lost in the finals to Philadelphia University.

McClain was selected in the second round of the 1971 NBA draft by the Atlanta Hawks and in the same year's ABA Draft by the Carolina Cougars. McClain opted to play for the Cougars.

McClain competed for the Carolina Cougars, Kentucky Colonels, New York Nets, Denver Nuggets, Buffalo Braves, Philadelphia 76ers, and Phoenix Suns. In his career, McClain averaged 8.4 points per game and 3.4 assists per game. He also appeared in the 1974 ABA All-Star Game.

McClain holds the ABA record for steals in a single game with 12, set against the New York Nets on December 26, 1973.
