= Chuck Williams (basketball) =

American basketball player

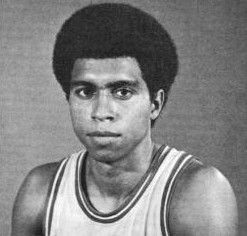

Personal information
- Born: June 6, 1946 (age 80) Boulder, Colorado, U.S.
- Listed height: 6 ft 2 in (1.88 m)
- Listed weight: 175 lb (79 kg)

Career information
- High school: East (Denver, Colorado)
- College: Colorado (1965–1968)
- NBA draft: 1968: 6th round, 76th overall pick
- Drafted by: Philadelphia 76ers
- Playing career: 1970–1978
- Position: Point guard
- Number: 21, 23, 15, 4, 11

Career history
- 1970–1971: Pittsburgh Condors
- 1971–1972: Denver Rockets
- 1972–1974: San Diego Conquistadors
- 1974: Kentucky Colonels
- 1974–1975: Memphis Sounds
- 1975–1976: Denver Nuggets
- 1976–1978: Buffalo Braves

Career highlights
- 2× ABA All-Star (1973, 1976)

Career ABA and NBA statistics
- Points: 6,894 (10.8 ppg)
- Rebounds: 1,489 (2.3 rpg)
- Assists: 2,869 (4.5 apg)
- Stats at NBA.com
- Stats at Basketball Reference

Edward "Chuck" Williams (born June 6, 1946) is an American former basketball player who competed in both the National Basketball Association (NBA) and the rival American Basketball Association (ABA). A 6-foot-2-inch (1.88 m) guard from the University of Colorado, he played eight professional seasons (1970–1978), spending time with multiple teams including the Pittsburgh Condors (ABA), the Denver Nuggets (ABA, then NBA), the San Diego Conquistadors (ABA), the Kentucky Colonels (ABA), the Memphis Sounds (ABA), the Baltimore Claws (ABA), the Virginia Squires (ABA) and the Buffalo Braves (NBA).

Williams's finest season occurred in 1972–73, when he averaged 17.7 points and 7.7 assists for the Conquistadors. He retired in 1978 with career totals of 6,849 points and 2,869 assists. He holds the record for most games played in a single season, registering 90 games (57 for San Diego and 33 for Kentucky) during the 1973–74 ABA season.
