= Brian Taylor (basketball) =

American basketball player (born 1951)

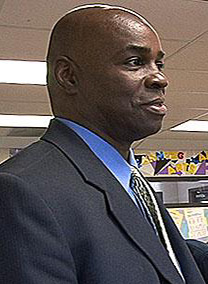
- Taylor in 2010

Personal information
- Born: June 9, 1951 (age 75) Perth Amboy, New Jersey, U.S.
- Listed height: 6 ft 2 in (1.88 m)
- Listed weight: 185 lb (84 kg)

Career information
- High school: Perth Amboy (Perth Amboy, New Jersey)
- College: Princeton (1970–1972)
- NBA draft: 1972: 2nd round, 23rd overall pick
- Drafted by: Seattle SuperSonics
- Playing career: 1972–1982
- Position: Point guard
- Number: 14

Career history
- 1972–1976: New York Nets
- 1976–1977: Kansas City Kings
- 1977–1978: Denver Nuggets
- 1978–1982: San Diego Clippers

Career highlights
- 2× ABA champion (1974, 1976); 2× ABA All-Star (1975, 1976); All-ABA Second Team (1975); 2× ABA All-Defensive First Team (1975, 1976); NBA All-Defensive Second Team (1977); ABA Rookie of the Year (1973); ABA All-Rookie First Team (1973); ABA steals leader (1975); Second-team All-American – NABC (1972); Third-team All-American – AP, UPI (1972)

Career ABA and NBA statistics
- Points: 7,868 (13.1 ppg)
- Assists: 2,478 (4.1 apg)
- Steals: 1,106 (2.1 spg)
- Stats at NBA.com
- Stats at Basketball Reference

Brian Dwight Taylor (born June 9, 1951) is an American former professional basketball player who played for the New York Nets of the American Basketball Association (ABA) and the Kansas City Kings, Denver Nuggets, and San Diego Clippers of the National Basketball Association (NBA).

== Basketball career ==
A 6'2" point guard from Princeton University, he was selected by the Seattle SuperSonics in the second round of the 1972 NBA draft. However, he began his professional career with the New York Nets of the ABA, for whom he played four seasons, appearing in two ABA All-Star Games. When the Nets joined the National Basketball Association (NBA) in 1976, they traded Taylor to the Kansas City Kings along with Jim Eakins and 2 first-round draft picks in exchange for Hall of Famer Tiny Archibald. He averaged a career-high 17 points per game in 1976–77. He also played for the Denver Nuggets and San Diego Clippers, before a torn achilles tendon forced his retirement in 1982.

Taylor graduated from Perth Amboy High School in 1969.

During the 1979–80 NBA season, Taylor led the league in 3-point field goals made (the season the NBA first implemented the 3-point line) with a total of 90.

== Career statistics ==
Legend
GP	Games played	GS	Games started	MPG	Minutes per game
FG%	Field goal percentage	3P%	3-point field goal percentage	FT%	Free throw percentage
RPG	Rebounds per game	APG	Assists per game	SPG	Steals per game
BPG	Blocks per game	PPG	Points per game	**Bold**	Career high
*	Led the league

†	Denotes seasons in which Taylor's team won an ABA championship

=== Regular season ===
Year	Team	GP	GS	MPG	FG%	3P%	FT%	RPG	APG	SPG	BPG	PPG
1972–73	New York (ABA)	63	—	32.3	.515	.160	.743	3.2	2.8	—	—	15.3
1973–74†	New York (ABA)	75	—	33.4	.476	.276	.699	2.9	4.5	2.1	.3	11.1
1974–75	New York (ABA)	79	—	33.1	.513	.217	.765	2.9	3.6	**2.8***	.3	14.0
1975–76†	New York (ABA)	54	—	32.1	.489	**.421***	.792	3.0	3.8	2.3	**.4**	16.7
1976–77	Kansas City	72	—	34.6	.504	—	.818	**3.3**	4.4	**2.8**	.2	**17.0**
1977–78	Denver	39	—	31.3	.452	—	.765	2.5	3.4	1.8	.2	11.6
1978–79	San Diego	20	—	10.6	.361	—	**.889**	1.3	1.0	1.2	.0	3.8
1979–80	San Diego	78	—	**35.3**	.467	.377	.802	2.4	4.3	1.9	.3	13.5
1980–81	San Diego	**80**	—	28.9	**.525**	.383*	.789	1.9	5.5	1.5	.3	10.1
1981–82	San Diego	41	40	31.1	.503	.365	.818	2.3	**5.6**	1.1	.2	10.8
Career		601	40	31.9	.493	.356	.780	2.7	4.1	2.1	.3	13.1
All-Star		2	—	25.0	.545	.000	.600	2.5	5.5	2.0	.0	13.5

=== Playoffs ===
Year	Team	GP	GS	MPG	FG%	3P%	FT%	RPG	APG	SPG	BPG	PPG
1973	New York (ABA)	5	—	33.2	.483	.000	.800	3.2	2.2	—	—	13.6
1974†	New York (ABA)	**14**	—	36.2	**.518**	**.667**	.767	**4.4**	**4.4**	**2.4**	**.3**	14.1
1975	New York (ABA)	5	—	**37.2**	.361	.333	**1.000**	2.4	2.8	1.4	.2	6.2
1976†	New York (ABA)	13*	—	36.5	.380	.300	.739	2.6	3.5	2.0	.2	**15.8**
Career		37	—	36.1	.440	.324	.768	3.3	3.6	2.1	.3	13.5

== Personal life ==
Taylor's son Bryce played for the Oregon Ducks.

In 2012, Great Hearts Academies hired Taylor to be the executive director of Teleos Preparatory Academy in Phoenix, Arizona.
