= 1974 ABA playoffs =

Basketball competition

Tournament details
- Dates: March 29 – May 10, 1974
- Season: 1973–74
- Teams: 8

Final positions
- Champions: New York Nets (1st title)
- Runners-up: Utah Stars
- Semifinalists: Kentucky Colonels; Indiana Pacers

The 1974 ABA playoffs was the postseason tournament of the American Basketball Association's 1973–74 season. The tournament concluded with the Eastern Division champion New York Nets defeating the Western Division champion Utah Stars, four games to one in the ABA Finals.

== Notable events ==
A one-game playoff was held to determine the fourth-place finisher in the Western Division because the San Diego Conquistadors and Denver Rockets had both tied for fourth place during the regular season. The game was played on March 29, 1974, with the Conquistadors posting a 131–111 win at Denver.

The Carolina Cougars played their final game on April 8, 1974, losing at home to the Kentucky Colonels 128–119 in the last game of their Eastern Division semifinal series, which the Colonels swept 4 games to none. The Cougars played in the remaining two seasons of the ABA as the Spirits of St. Louis and were one of only two teams (the Colonels being the other) remaining during the ABA-NBA merger to not enter the NBA.

The New York Nets and Utah Stars won the Eastern Division and Western Division, respectively, in both the regular season and the playoffs.

The New York Nets became the first team since the 1969-1970 Indiana Pacers to win the ABA championship after posting the league's best regular season record.

Julius Erving of the New York Nets was the Most Valuable Player of the ABA playoffs. He won that distinction again in 1976 and became the only player in ABA history to repeat as the MVP of the league playoffs.

== Bracket ==
Division Semifinals
1	Utah Stars	4
4	San Diego Conquistadors	2
Western Division
3	San Antonio Spurs	3
2	Indiana Pacers	4
1	New York Nets	4
4	Virginia Squires	1
Eastern Division
3	Carolina Cougars	0
2	Kentucky Colonels	4

Division Finals
1	Utah Stars	4
2	Indiana Pacers	3
1	New York Nets	4
2	Kentucky Colonels	0

ABA Finals
W1	Utah Stars	1
E1	New York Nets	4

== Western Division Tiebreaker Game ==
March 29

Box score

San Diego Conquistadors 131, Denver Rockets 111
Scoring by quarter: 37–29, 30–19, 33–33, 31–30
Pts: Bo Lamar 40; Rebs: Tim Bassett 12; Asts: Jimmy O'Brien 12	Pts: Beck, Robisch 18 each Rebs: Beck, Green 8 each Asts: Al Smith 20
San Diego wins tiebreaker

Denver Auditorium Arena, Denver, Colorado
Attendance: 3,305

With a barrage of shots that saw San Diego shoot 60% from the field and rookie Bo Lamar score 40 points, the Conquistadors vanquished the Rockets to get the fourth spot. They connected from 15 of their first 20 shots to get a 37-29 lead after one quarter and never looked back, as Denver could only narrow it to eight points in the second quarter before San Diego rolled to a 19-point lead at halftime, with Lamar scoring 17 points in the first half to go with Stu Johnson's 22 (with six more in the second half). Denver had the dubious distinction of having lost both ABA Tiebreaker Games ever played on the court to determine a playoff team.

== Division Semifinals ==
=== Western Division Semifinals ===
==== (1) Utah Stars vs. (4) San Diego Conquistadors ====
March 30

Box score

San Diego Conquistadors 99, Utah Stars 114
Scoring by quarter: 30–33, 23–29, 27–22, 19–30
Pts: Bo Lamar 23; Rebs: Tim Bassett 17; Asts: Tim Bassett 7	Pts: Zelmo Beaty 27; Rebs: Gerald Govan 21; Asts: Ron Boone 9
Utah leads series, 1–0

Salt Palace, Salt Lake City, Utah
Attendance: 5,558

April 1

Box score

San Diego Conquistadors 105, Utah Stars 119
Scoring by quarter: 25–35, 17–24, 28–26, 35–34
Pts: Bo Lamar 41; Rebs: Tim Bassett 19; Asts: Lamar, O'Brien, Shepherd 5 each	Pts: Willie Wise 23; Rebs: Gerald Govan 25; Asts: Ron Boone 11
Utah leads series, 2–0

Salt Palace, Salt Lake City, Utah
Attendance: 6,242

April 3

Box score

Utah Stars 96, San Diego Conquistadors 97
Scoring by quarter: 20–35, 25–21, 27–17, 24–24
Pts: Willie Wise 29; Rebs: Gerald Govan 17; Asts: Ron Boone 12	Pts: Bo Lamar 22; Rebs: Caldwell Jones 18; Asts: Jones, Bassett, Johnson, O'Brien 5 each
Utah leads series, 2–1

Golden Hall, San Diego, California
Attendance: 2,295

April 4

Box score

Utah Stars 98, San Diego Conquistadors 100
Scoring by quarter: 35–19, 28–23, 21–30, 14–28
Pts: Willie Wise 30; Rebs: Gerald Govan 18; Asts: Gerald Govan 7	Pts: Bo Lamar 32; Rebs: Jones, Bassett 13 each Asts: Jim O'Brien 5
Series tied, 2–2

Golden Hall, San Diego, California
Attendance: 2,089

April 6

Box score

San Diego Conquistadors 93, Utah Stars 110
Scoring by quarter: 20–19, 29–29, 19–31, 25–31
Pts: Tim Bassett 26; Rebs: Tim Bassett 19; Asts: O'Brien, Shepherd 4 each	Pts: Willie Wise 30; Rebs: Gerald Govan 19; Asts: Jimmy Jones 8
Utah leads series, 3–2

Salt Palace, Salt Lake City, Utah
Attendance: 6,648

April 8

Box score

Utah Stars 110, San Diego Conquistadors 99
Scoring by quarter: 34–20, 21–36, 24–16, 31–27
Pts: Wise, Jones 21 each Rebs: Zelmo Beaty 12; Asts: Jimmy Jones 7	Pts: Bo Lamar 33; Rebs: Caldwell Jones 22; Asts: Bo Lamar 7
Utah wins series, 4–2

Golden Hall, San Diego, California
Attendance: 3,140

==== (2) Indiana Pacers vs. (3) San Antonio Spurs ====
March 30

Box score

San Antonio Spurs 113, Indiana Pacers 109
Scoring by quarter: 27–28, 33–20, 23–27, 30–34
Pts: Rich Jones 27; Rebs: Gervin, Nater 10 each Asts: Gervi, Silas 4 each	Pts: Lewis, Daniels 19 each Rebs: Mel Daniels 11; Asts: Roger Brown 7
San Antonio leads series, 1–0

Indiana State Fair Coliseum, Indianapolis, Indiana
Attendance: 7,438

April 1

Box score

San Antonio Spurs 101, Indiana Pacers 128
Scoring by quarter: 18–25, 20–35, 32–30, 31–38
Pts: Rich Jones 26; Rebs: Swen Nater 12; Asts: 6 players tied with 2	Pts: Billy Keller 39; Rebs: Darnell Hillman 10; Asts: Freddie Lewis 10
Series tied, 1–1

Indiana State Fair Coliseum, Indianapolis, Indiana
Attendance: 6,988

April 3

Box score

Indiana Pacers 96, San Antonio Spurs 115
Scoring by quarter: 19–31, 24–24, 25–27, 28–33
Pts: George McGinnis 25; Rebs: McGinnis, Daniels 10 each Asts: Roger Brown 6	Pts: Swen Nater 27; Rebs: Swen Nater 15; Asts: George Karl 11
San Antonio leads series, 2–1

HemisFair Arena, San Antonio, Texas
Attendance: 10,693

April 4

Box score

Indiana Pacers 91, San Antonio Spurs 89
Scoring by quarter: 33–21, 17–23, 17–28, 24–17
Pts: Roger Brown 29; Rebs: George McGinnis 8 Asts: Roger Brown 8	Pts: Rich Jones 28; Rebs: Rich Jones 8 Asts: James Silas 5
Series tied, 2–2

HemisFair Arena, San Antonio, Texas
Attendance: 12,079

April 6

Box score

San Antonio Spurs 100, Indiana Pacers 105
Scoring by quarter: 22–25, 24–24, 23–24, 31–32
Pts: James Silas 28; Rebs: Swen Nater 12; Asts: James Silas 7	Pts: Freddie Lewis 35; Rebs: Mel Daniels 14; Asts: Billy Keller 5
Indiana leads series, 3–2

Indiana State Fair Coliseum, Indianapolis, Indiana
Attendance: 10,079

April 10

Box score

Indiana Pacers 86, San Antonio Spurs 102
Scoring by quarter: 23–28, 19–24, 25–24, 19–26
Pts: Roger Brown 26; Rebs: Mel Daniels 14; Asts: Roger Brown 6	Pts: Bird Averitt 19; Rebs: Swen Nater 13; Asts: James Silas 7
Series tied, 3–3

HemisFair Arena, San Antonio, Texas
Attendance: 12,304

April 12

Box score

San Antonio Spurs 79, Indiana Pacers 86
Scoring by quarter: 12–14, 30–15, 22–30, 15–27
Pts: James Silas 27; Rebs: Swen Nater 13; Asts: Swen Nater 6	Pts: Roger Brown 28; Rebs: George McGinnis 17; Asts: Brown, Lewis 3 each
Indiana wins series, 4–3

Indiana State Fair Coliseum, Indianapolis, Indiana
Attendance: 10,079

The Pacers trailed 42-29 at halftime, earning a record for least points in a half that they did with 8-of-33 shooting. Late in the third quarter, George McGinnis scored ten points to go along with 12 by Roger Brown to get the Pacers close as the final quarter loomed. The two teams were tied at 64 with 9:47 to go in a tight defensive battle that saw Indiana outshot in total field goals (27-of-78 to San Antonio's 31-of-74). With the score 72-69 and under six minutes to go, Brown sunk a three-pointer to give the Pacers a six-point lead that they managed to pull away for the remaining minutes. The Pacers received plenty of free throws, scoring 30 from 43 shots while San Antonio went 17-of-25.

=== Eastern Division Semifinals ===
==== (1) New York Nets vs. (4) Virginia Squires ====
March 29

Box score

Virginia Squires 96, New York Nets 108
Scoring by quarter: 27–28, 19–26, 26–27, 24–27
Pts: Cincy Powell 22; Rebs: Cincy Powell 15; Asts: Mike Barr 7	Pts: Julius Erving 24; Rebs: Larry Kenon 12; Asts: Julius Erving 12
New York leads series, 1–0

Nassau Veterans Memorial Coliseum, Uniondale, New York
Attendance: 9,784

April 1

Box score

Virginia Squires 110, New York Nets 129
Scoring by quarter: 28–33, 20–39, 28–24, 34–33
Pts: George Carter 27; Rebs: Carter, Eakins 7 each Asts: Fatty Taylor 6	Pts: Julius Erving 35; Rebs: Larry Kenon 12; Asts: Gale, Taylor 7 each
New York leads series, 2–0

Nassau Veterans Memorial Coliseum, Uniondale, New York
Attendance: 10,747

April 4

Box score

New York Nets 115, Virginia Squires 116
Scoring by quarter: 29–21, 26–31, 24–32, 36–32
Pts: Julius Erving 29; Rebs: Julius Erving 12; Asts: Brian Taylor 7	Pts: Jim Eakins 31; Rebs: Fatty Taylor 9 Asts: Fatty Taylor 5
New York leads series, 2–1

Hampton Coliseum, Hampton, Virginia
Attendance: 2,544

April 7

Box score

New York Nets 116, Virginia Squires 88
Scoring by quarter: 30–29, 30–15, 24–27, 32–17
Pts: Larry Kenon 25; Rebs: Larry Kenon 11; Asts: Erving, Gale 5 each	Pts: Cincy Powell 22; Rebs: Cincy Powell 10; Asts: Fatty Taylor 8
New York leads series, 3–1

Norfolk Scope, Norfolk, Virginia
Attendance: 4,220

April 8

Box score

Virginia Squires 96, New York Nets 108
Scoring by quarter: 16–20, 26–23, 27–29, 27–36
Pts: Jim Eakins 36; Rebs: Jim Eakins 21; Asts: Fatty Taylor 4	Pts: Larry Kenon 22; Rebs: Billy Paultz 9 Asts: Erving, Taylor 5 each
New York wins series, 4–1

Nassau Veterans Memorial Coliseum, Uniondale, New York
Attendance: 11,903

==== (2) Kentucky Colonels vs. (3) Carolina Cougars ====
April 1

Box score

Carolina Cougars 102, Kentucky Colonels 118
Scoring by quarter: 24–29, 24–28, 21–26, 33–35
Pts: Mack Calvin 21; Rebs: Jim Chones 7 Asts: Gene Littles 6	Pts: Artis Gilmore 33; Rebs: Artis Gilmore 19; Asts: Chuck Williams 7
Kentucky leads series, 1–0

Freedom Hall, Louisville, Kentucky
Attendance: 6,749

With high winds blowing outside Freedom Hall, the Colonels beat the Cougars handily.

April 5

Box score

Kentucky Colonels 99, Carolina Cougars 96
Scoring by quarter: 18–21, 23–25, 27–23, 31–27
Pts: Artis Gilmore 34; Rebs: Artis Gilmore 20; Asts: Artis Gilmore 4	Pts: Calvin, McClain 20 each Rebs: Joe Caldwell 13; Asts: Mack Calvin 5
Kentucky leads series, 2–0

Greensboro Coliseum, Greensboro, North Carolina
Attendance: 8,638

Game 2 was delayed from the original date of April 3 due to a tornado that had caused damage to Freedom Hall that meant that the two teams had to play in Greensboro rather than in Kentucky. Billy Cunningham played for seventeen minutes despite having recently undergone a kidney operation. Carolina was outrebounded (58-43) and out fouled (committing 33 to Kentucky's 24, with team coach Larry Brown even garnering a technical foul). With six minutes remaining, Louie Dampier hit a bank shot to give Kentucky an 85-84 lead with 6:23 remaining. The Colonels led by five with 1:32 to go, but the Cougars managed to get it down to one with layups by Marv Roberts with 0:19 remaining. Dampier was quickly fouled and only made one free throw while Carolina managed to get a chance to inbound for the potential tie/win with 15 seconds to go. But on the play, it fell to Jim Chones to have to take a shot from 12 feet out that missed for Kentucky to recover and then add another free throw to ice the game.

April 6

Box score

Kentucky Colonels 120, Carolina Cougars 110
Scoring by quarter: 26–14, 26–22, 38–31, 30–43
Pts: Artis Gilmore 19; Rebs: Artis Gilmore 15; Asts: Chuck Williams 8	Pts: Mack Calvin 25; Rebs: Jim Chones 9 Asts: Caldwell, Littles 3 each
Kentucky leads series, 3–0

Charlotte Coliseum, Charlotte, North Carolina
Attendance: 3,724

April 8

Box score

Carolina Cougars 119, Kentucky Colonels 128
Scoring by quarter: 31–28, 25–35, 24–30, 39–35
Pts: Mack Calvin 31; Rebs: McClain, Cunningham, Caldwell 7 each Asts: Gene Littles 7	Pts: Artis Gilmore 33; Rebs: Artis Gilmore 20; Asts: Louie Dampier 8
Kentucky wins series, 4–0

Freedom Hall, Louisville, Kentucky
Attendance: 5,243

== Division Finals ==
=== Western Division Finals ===
==== (1) Utah Stars vs. (2) Indiana Pacers ====
April 13

Box score

Indiana Pacers 96, Utah Stars 105
Scoring by quarter: 24–31, 19–22, 29–21, 24–31
Pts: George McGinnis 39; Rebs: George McGinnis 14; Asts: Freddie Lewis 5	Pts: Willie Wise 34; Rebs: Gerald Govan 17; Asts: Govan, Jones 6 each
Utah leads series, 1–0

Salt Palace, Salt Lake City, Utah
Attendance: 7,557

April 15

Box score

Indiana Pacers 102, Utah Stars 106
Scoring by quarter: 18–24, 26–32, 26–26, 32–24
Pts: George McGinnis 30; Rebs: George McGinnis 17; Asts: George McGinnis 5	Pts: Ron Boone 20; Rebs: Zelmo Beaty 13; Asts: Ron Boone 8
Utah leads series, 2–0

Salt Palace, Salt Lake City, Utah
Attendance: 7,143

April 17

Box score

Utah Stars 99, Indiana Pacers 90
Scoring by quarter: 20–26, 32–19, 17–23, 30–22
Pts: Ron Boone 24; Rebs: Zelmo Beaty 20; Asts: Govan, Boone 5 each	Pts: George McGinnis 27; Rebs: George McGinnis 13; Asts: Don Buse 6
Utah leads series, 3–0

Indiana State Fair Coliseum, Indianapolis, Indiana
Attendance: 6,337

April 18

Box score

Utah Stars 107, Indiana Pacers 118
Scoring by quarter: 23–24, 37–26, 27–42, 20–26
Pts: Willie Wise 22; Rebs: Zelmo Beaty 9 Asts: Ron Boone 6	Pts: Freddie Lewis 40; Rebs: Mel Daniels 14; Asts: Freddie Lewis 6
Utah leads series, 3–1

Indiana State Fair Coliseum, Indianapolis, Indiana
Attendance: 6,265

Zelmo Beaty suffered an injury during the game that knocked him out for the rest of the series.

April 22

Box score

Indiana Pacers 110, Utah Stars 101
Scoring by quarter: 19–20, 37–26, 25–36, 29–19
Pts: Daniels, McGinnis 29 each Rebs: Daniels, McGinnis 14 each Asts: George McGinnis 10	Pts: Willie Wise 27; Rebs: Gerald Govan 13; Asts: Jimmy Jones 7
Utah leads series, 3–2

Salt Palace, Salt Lake City, Utah
Attendance: 10,248

April 25

Box score

Utah Stars 89, Indiana Pacers 91
Scoring by quarter: 15–27, 25–21, 22–20, 27–23
Pts: Willie Wise 24; Rebs: Willie Wise 10; Asts: Ron Boone 6	Pts: George McGinnis 23; Rebs: McGinnis, Hillman 16 each Asts: Don Buse 6
Series tied, 3–3

Indiana State Fair Coliseum, Indianapolis, Indiana
Attendance: 9,482

April 27

Box score

Indiana Pacers 87, Utah Stars 109
Scoring by quarter: 20–36, 23–28, 17–16, 27–29
Pts: Roger Brown 21; Rebs: George McGinnis 13; Asts: McGinnis, Lewis, Keller 3 each	Pts: Jimmy Jones 29; Rebs: Govan, Wise 10 each Asts: Jimmy Jones 9
Utah wins series, 4–3

Salt Palace, Salt Lake City, Utah
Attendance: 12,191

Without Beaty for the third straight game, Willie Wise limited George McGinnis to 14 points as the Stars staved off the Pacers and their attempt to come back from being down 3–0.

=== Eastern Division Finals ===
==== (1) New York Nets vs. (2) Kentucky Colonels ====
April 13

Box score

Kentucky Colonels 106, New York Nets 119
Scoring by quarter: 30–26, 21–26, 24–38, 31–29
Pts: Dan Issel 22; Rebs: Artis Gilmore 10; Asts: Chuck Williams 7	Pts: Julius Erving 35; Rebs: Larry Kenon 15; Asts: Brian Taylor 7
New York leads series, 1–0

Nassau Veterans Memorial Coliseum, Uniondale, New York
Attendance: 12,817

April 15

Box score

Kentucky Colonels 80, New York Nets 99
Scoring by quarter: 22–21, 13–18, 26–30, 19–30
Pts: Louie Dampier 16; Rebs: Artis Gilmore 18; Asts: Artis Gilmore 4	Pts: Julius Erving 27; Rebs: Wendell Ladner 14; Asts: Wendell Ladner 5
New York leads series, 2–0

Nassau Veterans Memorial Coliseum, Uniondale, New York
Attendance: 13,726

April 17

Box score

New York Nets 89, Kentucky Colonels 87
Scoring by quarter: 18–31, 27–23, 24–19, 20–14
Pts: Julius Erving 30; Rebs: Julius Erving 14; Asts: Gale, Williamson 4 each	Pts: Dan Issel 26; Rebs: Artis Gilmore 27; Asts: Louie Dampier 8
New York leads series, 3–0

Freedom Hall, Louisville, Kentucky
Attendance: 13,797

Kentucky led for most of the game, even leading at nine at halftime and four to start the final quarter before Larry Kenon made a shot to give New York an 87-85 lead late in the game on the cusp of a 20-12 run. Jim Bradley then sunk a shot in to tie the game at 87 before Julius Erving went up with the ball, moved around Artis Gilmore at the top of the key before moving to the foul line to shoot a one-handed 15-foot shot as the buzzer sounded. It is believed to be the first ABA buzzer-beater playoff shot in history.

April 20

Box score

New York Nets 103, Kentucky Colonels 90
Scoring by quarter: 31–27, 33–22, 20–23, 19–18
Pts: Julius Erving 27; Rebs: Billy Paultz 12; Asts: Brian Taylor 6	Pts: Artis Gilmore 20; Rebs: Artis Gilmore 20; Asts: John Roche 7
New York wins series, 4–0

Memorial Coliseum, Louisville, Kentucky
Attendance: 7,800

== ABA Finals: (E1) New York Nets vs. (W1) Utah Stars ==
April 30

Box score

Utah Stars 85, New York Nets 89
Scoring by quarter: 14–22, 26–20, 25–25, 20–22
Pts: Jimmy Jones 25; Rebs: Wise, Gerald Govan 12 each Asts: Jones, Wise, Govan, Bruce Seals 2 each	Pts: Julius Erving 47; Rebs: Larry Kenon 20; Asts: John Williamson 5
New York leads series, 1–0

Nassau Veterans Memorial Coliseum, Uniondale, New York
Attendance: 13,740

Julius Erving scored 47 points (26 in the first half) but the Stars were leading late even with injuries. Nursing a 75–69 lead with eight minutes to go, Larry Kenon would come back into the game as the Nets went on a 15–6 run. Kenon and Julius Erving combined for 65 points

Utah was outshot and outrebounded while Gerald Govan tweaked his knee late in the game.

May 4

Box score

Utah Stars 94, New York Nets 118
Scoring by quarter: 19–28, 18–33, 30–20, 27–37
Pts: Jones, Wise 19 each Rebs: Wise, Govan 12 each Asts: Ron Boone 8	Pts: Julius Erving 32; Rebs: Larry Kenon 13; Asts: Bill Melchionni 7
New York leads series, 2–0

Nassau Veterans Memorial Coliseum, Uniondale, New York
Attendance: 15,934

A battered Utah team with no Beaty and a diminished Govan shot under 30 percent in the first half and could not recover from there as Julius Erving scored 32 points to give the Nets their eight straight playoff win.

May 6

Box score

New York Nets 103, Utah Stars 100 (OT)
Scoring by quarter: 17–25, 26–18, 31–19, 20–32, Overtime: 9–6
Pts: Julius Erving 24; Rebs: Julius Erving 13; Asts: Mike Gale 8	Pts: Jimmy Jones 28; Rebs: Zelmo Beaty 16; Asts: Jimmy Jones 6
New York leads series, 3–0

Salt Palace, Salt Lake City, Utah
Attendance: 10,743

Utah (now with Beaty playing) had managed to overcome a 15-point deficit to pull ahead late 94-91 with under 15 seconds to go. Wendell Ladner missed the shot but rebounded it and passed it to Brian Taylor, who successfully made it from the three-line to send the game into overtime. The Nets took control from there and won the game to get one win away from a sweep.

May 8

Box score

New York Nets 89, Utah Stars 97
Scoring by quarter: 18–26, 24–24, 34–24, 13–23
Pts: Julius Erving 18; Rebs: Larry Kenon 15; Asts: Julius Erving 7	Pts: Jimmy Jones 24; Rebs: Gerald Govan 23; Asts: Ron Boone 10
New York leads series, 3–1

Salt Palace, Salt Lake City, Utah
Attendance: 10,743

New York managed to lead by two after the third quarter, but the Stars took control with tough defense that allowed just 13 points in the fourth quarter while Jimmy Jones scored 24 points.

May 10

Box score

Utah Stars 100, New York Nets 111
Scoring by quarter: 27–28, 21–22, 29–30, 23–31
Pts: Willie Wise 34; Rebs: Gerald Govan 10; Asts: Willie Wise 6	Pts: Larry Kenon 23; Rebs: Julius Erving 16; Asts: Williamson, Gale 5 each
New York wins series, 4–1

Nassau Veterans Memorial Coliseum, Uniondale, New York
Attendance: 15,934

The Nets completed their dominant run (winning 12 of their 14 playoff games, a record for most dominant run for an ABA champion) with 23 points by Larry Kenon.

== Statistical leaders ==
Category	Total			Average			
Category	Player	Team	Total	Player	Team	Avg.	Games played
Points	Willie Wise	Utah Stars	420	Julius Erving	New York Nets	27.9	14
Rebounds	Gerald Govan	Utah Stars	246	Artis Gilmore	Kentucky Colonels	18.6	8
Assists	Ron Boone	Utah Stars	109	Ron Boone	Utah Stars	6.1	18
Steals	Brian Taylor	New York Nets	33	Mike Barr	Virginia Squires	2.4	5
Blocks	Artis Gilmore	Kentucky Colonels	30	Artis Gilmore	Kentucky Colonels	3.8	8

=== Total leaders ===
Points

1. Willie Wise - 420
2. Julius Erving - 390
3. Jimmy Jones - 374
4. George McGinnis - 336
5. Ron Boone - 308

Rebounds

1. Gerald Govan - 246
2. George McGinnis - 166
3. Larry Kenon - 163
4. Mel Daniels - 160
5. Willie Wise - 149
6. Artis Gilmore - 149

Assists

1. Ron Boone - 109
2. Jimmy Jones - 98
3. Gerald Govan - 73
4. Julius Erving - 67
5. Freddie Lewis - 62
6. Brian Taylor - 62

Minutes

1. Willie Wise - 792
2. Ron Boone - 747
3. Jimmy Jones - 742
4. Gerald Govan - 714
5. George McGinnis - 585
