= 1976 ABA playoffs =

Basketball competition

Tournament details
- Dates: April 8 – May 13, 1976
- Season: 1975–76
- Teams: 5

Final positions
- Champions: New York Nets (2nd title)
- Runners-up: Denver Nuggets
- Semifinalists: Kentucky Colonels; San Antonio Spurs

The 1976 ABA playoffs was the postseason tournament of the American Basketball Association's 1975–76 season. The tournament concluded with the New York Nets defeating the Denver Nuggets four games to two in the ABA Finals.

This was the final year of the ABA. The ABA-NBA merger took place on June 17, 1976. Thus the final game in ABA history was played on May 13, 1976, when the New York Nets defeated the Denver Nuggets 112–106 at Nassau Coliseum in Uniondale, New York.

As there were no divisions in the regular season, the playoffs involved five teams, with a first-round best-of-three series played between the fourth-place Kentucky Colonels and fifth-place Indiana Pacers; Kentucky won the series, 2 games to 1.

== Notable events ==
Julius Erving of the New York Nets was the Most Valuable Player of the ABA playoffs. He won that distinction previously in 1974 and became the only player in ABA history to repeat as the MVP of the league playoffs.

On April 28, 1976, the Kentucky Colonels lost the seventh game of their series with the Denver Nuggets. The loss marked the final game for the Colonels and the final game for any ABA team that did not proceed into the NBA with the ABA-NBA merger.

During halftime of Game 3 of the ABA Finals, league commissioner Dave DeBusschere called a news conference to announce the state of the league, which terminated the Virginia Squires franchise for failure to meet obligations of payment, although the Squires made a request to try and raise the $100,000 needed to keep the franchise alive before 4:00 pm CST on May 1. Ultimately, the team ultimately folded a day later. The league also made plans to potentially allow the Spirits of St. Louis to move to Salt Lake City if the league did in fact go to an eight-team league for 1977 while "still thinking about [a] merger".

The Nuggets and the Nets met in the championship series after posting the two best regular season records in the league. The Nets' victory over the Nuggets marked the last time that a professional basketball team from the New York area won a championship title until the 2024 WNBA Finals, when the New York Liberty defeated the Minnesota Lynx in five games to win their first title.

With their 4–3 loss in their opening round matchup with the New York Nets, the San Antonio Spurs concluded their ABA tenure without ever winning a single ABA playoff series. Since joining the NBA, the Spurs have won five NBA championships, starting with their 1999 victory over the #8 seed New York Knicks during the 1998–99 NBA season. The Pacers became the second ABA team to make the NBA Finals in 2000, where they lost to the Los Angeles Lakers. The Nets, by then playing in New Jersey, reached the Finals in 2002 and 2003, where they lost each time, including losing to the Spurs in the only Finals to date with two former ABA teams. The Nuggets became the last of the four ABA teams to reach the NBA Finals, doing so in 2023. They ultimately became the second ABA team to win an NBA title with their victory over the Miami Heat in five games.

== Bracket ==
Quarterfinals
# 4 | Kentucky Colonels | 2
# 5 | Indiana Pacers | 1

Semi-Finals
# 1 | Denver Nuggets | 4
# 4 | Kentucky Colonels | 3
# 2 | New York Nets | 4
# 3 | San Antonio Spurs | 3

Championship Series
# 1 | Denver Nuggets | 2
# 2 | New York Nets | 4

== First Round: Kentucky Colonels vs. Indiana Pacers ==
(1) Denver Nuggets, (2) New York Nets, (3) San Antonio Spurs have division Quarterfinals byes.

April 8

Box score

Indiana Pacers 109, Kentucky Colonels 120
Scoring by quarter: 20–41, 26–21, 31–31, 32–27
| Pts: Billy Knight 43; Rebs: Darnell Hillman 13; Asts: Darnell Hillman 5 | Pts: Artis Gilmore 25; Rebs: Artis Gilmore 17; Asts: Averitt, Dampier 10 each |
Kentucky leads series, 1–0

Freedom Hall, Louisville, Kentucky
Attendance: 3,288

Kentucky ran out the gate, leading by 21 after one quarter with 17-of-27 shooting, and they led by 16 at halftime before being up as much as 22 in the third quarter. Billy Knight tried to guide the Pacers back, scoring 43 points to lead all scorers and even getting the Pacers to down by just 10 with six minutes remaining, but the Colonels responded handily with the efforts of Artis Gilmore to score five straight points in quick succession as they held on to win.

April 10

Box score

Kentucky Colonels 95, Indiana Pacers 109
Scoring by quarter: 25–23, 18–24, 29–30, 23–32
| Pts: Artis Gilmore 26; Rebs: Maurice Lucas 14; Asts: Bird Averitt 6 | Pts: Billy Knight 28; Rebs: Knight, Hillman 11 each Asts: Don Buse 12 |
Series tied, 1–1

Market Square Arena, Indianapolis, Indiana
Attendance: 5,850

In what was the last game of the "I-65 Series" played in Indiana, the Pacers trailed in the third quarter 68-67 and proceeded to go on a quick run with four free throws and a shots from Dave Robisch and Billy Knight to give Indiana eight straight points as Indiana pulled away from that point to tie the series.

April 12

Box score

Indiana Pacers 99, Kentucky Colonels 100
Scoring by quarter: 11–26, 25–22, 35–22, 28–30
| Pts: Billy Knight 30; Rebs: Knight, Robisch 9 each Asts: Don Buse 9 | Pts: Artis Gilmore 27; Rebs: Artis Gilmore 16; Asts: Jan van Breda Kolff 6 |
Kentucky wins series, 2–1

Freedom Hall, Louisville, Kentucky
Attendance: 5,267

Late in the fourth quarter, Mike Flynn gave the Pacers a one-point lead off the bench with a three-point shot that made it 99–98. But Louie Dampier got the ball for Kentucky and managed to shoot the ball for a two-point play to give Kentucky the lead and ultimately the win.

== Semifinals ==
=== (1) Denver Nuggets vs. (4) Kentucky Colonels ===
April 15

Box score

Kentucky Colonels 107, Denver Nuggets 110
Scoring by quarter: 27–28, 31–30, 21–25, 28–27
| Pts: Lucas, Gilmore 26 each Rebs: Artis Gilmore 19; Asts: Louie Dampier 8 | Pts: Ralph Simpson 24; Rebs: Bobby Jones 9 Asts: Dan Issel 7 |
Denver leads series, 1–0

McNichols Sports Arena, Denver, Colorado
Attendance: 15,234

April 17

Box score

Kentucky Colonels 138, Denver Nuggets 110
Scoring by quarter: 35–39, 34–28, 33–26, 36–26
| Pts: Louie Dampier 26; Rebs: Artis Gilmore 12; Asts: Bird Averitt 9 | Pts: Dan Issel 24; Rebs: Dan Issel 13; Asts: Chuck Williams 5 |
Series tied, 1–1

McNichols Sports Arena, Denver, Colorado
Attendance: 16,384

April 19

Box score

Denver Nuggets 114, Kentucky Colonels 126
Scoring by quarter: 27–26, 25–29, 34–33, 28–38
| Pts: David Thompson 29; Rebs: Bobby Jones 10; Asts: David Thompson 5 | Pts: Bird Averitt 40; Rebs: Artis Gilmore 16; Asts: Bird Averitt 7 |
Kentucky leads series, 2–1

Freedom Hall, Louisville, Kentucky
Attendance: 9,644

April 21

Box score

Denver Nuggets 108, Kentucky Colonels 106
Scoring by quarter: 26–35, 23–16, 29–25, 30–30
| Pts: Ralph Simpson 26; Rebs: Bobby Jones 18; Asts: Bobby Jones 5 | Pts: Artis Gilmore 22; Rebs: Maurice Lucas 19; Asts: Louie Dampier 6 |
Series tied, 2–2

Freedom Hall, Louisville, Kentucky
Attendance: 11,444

April 22

Box score

Kentucky Colonels 117, Denver Nuggets 127
Scoring by quarter: 32–25, 26–29, 23–39, 36–34
| Pts: Artis Gilmore 26; Rebs: Artis Gilmore 12; Asts: Louie Dampier 14 | Pts: David Thompson 34; Rebs: Dan Issel 13; Asts: Ralph Simpson 6 |
Denver leads series 3–2

McNichols Sports Arena, Denver, Colorado
Attendance: 17,068

April 25

Box score

Denver Nuggets 115, Kentucky Colonels 119 (2OT)
Scoring by quarter: 24–24, 27–31, 19–23, 27–19, Overtime: 10–10, 8–12
| Pts: Ralph Simpson 35; Rebs: Dan Issel 18; Asts: Ralph Simpson 6 | Pts: Bird Averitt 34; Rebs: Artis Gilmore 26; Asts: Louie Dampier 11 |
Series tied, 3–3

Freedom Hall, Louisville, Kentucky
Attendance: 6,312

Wracked with tonsilitis and a high temperature that had affected him for a week, Bird Averitt rose to the occasion and scored 34 points to force a Game 7 for the Colonels. Averitt scored two field goals in the last 1:20 of regulation to help send the game to overtime with a score of 97-97. Ralph Simpson forced double overtime when he scored a bank shot to tie it at 107 for Denver with 28 seconds to go. In the second overtime, with the score 117-115 for Kentucky and less than 30 seconds remaining, Wil Jones drove down the lane and scored two points to increase the lead to four before a misguided inbound pass by Byron Beck soon led to the end of the game. This was the only ABA postseason game to last two overtimes and as it turned out, it was also the last Colonels game played in Kentucky.

April 28

Box score

Kentucky Colonels 110, Denver Nuggets 133
Scoring by quarter: 26–27, 30–30, 26–37, 28–39
| Pts: Maurice Lucas 23; Rebs: Maurice Lucas 15; Asts: Louie Dampier 11 | Pts: David Thompson 40; Rebs: Dan Issel 12; Asts: Ralph Simpson 14 |
Denver wins series 4–3

McNichols Sports Arena, Denver, Colorado
Attendance: 18,821

A tight first half eventually gave way with a dominant fast-break offense, where Denver led by 12 going into the final quarter. Kentucky cut the lead down to eight at one point before a missed dunk by Bird Averitt resulted in Denver taking the ball back and scoring to go up by ten that Colonels coach Hubie Brown stated was a big play. David Thompson led the teams in scoring with 40 while Dan Issel followed with 24. Despite being outdone in physicality, Denver outrebounded Kentucky 53–42.

=== (2) New York Nets vs. (3) San Antonio Spurs ===
April 9

Box score

San Antonio Spurs 101, New York Nets 116
Scoring by quarter: 18–33, 32–37, 28–27, 23–19
| Pts: George Gervin 30; Rebs: Paultz, Gale 7 each Asts: George Karl 4 | Pts: Julius Erving 31; Rebs: Tim Bassett 14; Asts: Brian Taylor 4 |
New York leads series, 1–0

Nassau Veterans Memorial Coliseum, Uniondale, New York
Attendance: 8,221

Julius Erving led the way with 31 points as the Nets led early on and never trailed after the first quarter. Significantly, James Silas (who went 3-of-10 for ten points when being double teamed) jammed his big toe on his left foot and twisted his right ankle in the early parts of the third quarter that saw him knocked out of the rest of the game. As it turned out, Silas suffered a chip fracture in his ankle that meant he would miss the rest of the playoffs.

April 11

Box score

San Antonio Spurs 105, New York Nets 79
Scoring by quarter: 20–23, 29–16, 26–21, 30–19
| Pts: Larry Kenon 30; Rebs: Billy Paultz 18; Asts: Mike Gale 13 | Pts: Julius Erving 27; Rebs: Skinner, Bassett, Hughes 10 each Asts: Erving, Jones, Skinner 3 each |
Series tied, 1–1

Nassau Veterans Memorial Coliseum, Uniondale, New York
Attendance: 5,769

April 14

Box score

New York Nets 103, San Antonio Spurs 111
Scoring by quarter: 31–21, 22–27, 20–27, 30–36
| Pts: Julius Erving 31; Rebs: Julius Erving 10; Asts: Julius Erving 8 | Pts: Larry Kenon 28; Rebs: Larry Kenon 16; Asts: Mike Gale 11 |
San Antonio leads series, 2–1

HemisFair Arena, San Antonio, Texas
Attendance: 10,009

April 18

Box score

New York Nets 110, San Antonio Spurs 108
Scoring by quarter: 24–25, 28–35, 28–28, 30–20
| Pts: Julius Erving 35; Rebs: Julius Erving 14; Asts: Kim Hughes 7 | Pts: Paultz, Gervin 28 each Rebs: Billy Paultz 12; Asts: Billy Paultz 5 |
Series tied, 2–2

HemisFair Arena, San Antonio, Texas
Attendance: 9,277
Referees: Ed Rush
Norm Drucker

With less than 20 seconds remaining and the Spurs leading 108–107, Rich Jones missed a shot for the Nets that saw George Gervin take the rebound for the Spurs near the baseline. However, Brian Taylor then knocked the ball out of Gervin's hands that saw Julius Erving get the ball and go for a dunk that saw him get fouled by Coby Dietrick. Erving made the free throw to give New York a two-point lead that they held on to. Spurs coach Bob Bass and Gervin each stated their belief that Taylor was out-of-bounds when he knocked the ball out behind Gervin. The game also saw a fight in the second quarter between Taylor and Spurs player George Karl that had to see policeman restore order while Karl played the rest of the game with a cut chin.

April 19

Box score

San Antonio Spurs 108, New York Nets 110
Scoring by quarter: 33–27, 24–30, 26–28, 25–25
| Pts: Larry Kenon 27; Rebs: Larry Kenon 12; Asts: Mike Gale 8 | Pts: Julius Erving 32; Rebs: Tim Bassett 12; Asts: Julius Erving 6 |
New York leads series 3–2

Nassau Veterans Memorial Coliseum, Uniondale, New York
Attendance: 11,321

With nine seconds to go, the Spurs were trailing by two with the ball and set up a play for Mike Gale. However, Julius Erving managed to block the jumper, and George Gervin's desperation shot at the buzzer bounced off the rim to give the Nets the win.

April 21

Box score

New York Nets 105, San Antonio Spurs 106
Scoring by quarter: 27–29, 21–23, 27–29, 30–25
| Pts: Julius Erving 41; Rebs: Tim Bassett 15; Asts: Brian Taylor 6 | Pts: George Gervin 37; Rebs: Larry Kenon 18; Asts: Gale, Paultz 5 each |
Series tied, 3–3

HemisFair Arena, San Antonio, Texas
Attendance: 10,484

With the Spurs trailing 105–104, Larry Kenon took a rebound on a missed shot and was fouled by Tim Bassett and went to the line with two free throws. He sank both of his free throws to give San Antonio the lead and ultimately the win.

Notably, Rich Jones did not play in Game 6, with Nets coach Kevin Loughery reportedly saying that it was because of "conditions caused by certain officials of the spurs and the local media" (reportedly, Jones was also not in the lineup so that he could avoid the Bexar County sheriff's office, who sent an officer about a non-payment of an overdue bill from Leon's department store).

April 24

Box score

San Antonio Spurs 114, New York Nets 121
Scoring by quarter: 22–24, 31–31, 28–29, 33–37
| Pts: George Gervin 31; Rebs: Larry Kenon 11; Asts: Mike Gale 6 | Pts: Julius Erving 28; Rebs: Julius Erving 18; Asts: Julius Erving 8 |
New York wins series 4–3

Nassau Veterans Memorial Coliseum, Uniondale, New York
Attendance: 15,934

This was the first home sellout for the Nets in two years. With the game tied at 96–96, the Nets went on the attack for a 17–4 run late in the game that saw Brian Taylor deliver nine points in a span of nearly three minutes while Julius Erving scored 28 points with 18 rebounds and Rich Jones delivered 25 points and 11 rebounds. George Gervin played the entire series with a broken bone in his shooting hand for the Spurs but managed to lead the team with 31 points.

== ABA Finals: New York Nets vs. Denver Nuggets ==
May 1

Box score

New York Nets 120, Denver Nuggets 118
Scoring by quarter: 32–31, 26–27, 32–26, 30–34
| Pts: Julius Erving 45; Rebs: Julius Erving 12; Asts: Brian Taylor 5 | Pts: David Thompson 30; Rebs: Marvin Webster 18; Asts: Ralph Simpson 9 |
New York leads series, 1–0

McNichols Sports Arena, Denver, Colorado
Attendance: 19,034

Behind a record crowd for a playoff game in league history (19,034), the Nets managed to outrebound the Nuggets and score with Erving ready to pounce, as he scored 18 of New York's final 24 points in the last 7:24 of the game. After Marvin Webster had managed to tie the game at 118 on a putback with four seconds remaining, the Nets went to Erving to try and get a shot, and while he wanted the baseline to drive to the hoop, he was cut off by Denver defender Bobby Jones into trying a shot from 20-feet out that he stated was one where he "just let it fly" that went into the net at the buzzer to give New York the win. It was the last ever buzzer-beater shot ever recorded in the ABA.

May 4

Box score

New York Nets 121, Denver Nuggets 127
Scoring by quarter: 25–29, 25–22, 31–34, 40–42
| Pts: Julius Erving 48; Rebs: Julius Erving 14; Asts: Julius Erving 8 | Pts: Ralph Simpson 25; Rebs: Dan Issel 14; Asts: Ralph Simpson 9 |
Series tied, 1–1

McNichols Sports Arena, Denver, Colorado
Attendance: 19,107

A new record for ABA crowds was set with 19,107 watching as the Nuggets struck back with a busy fourth quarter to hold off New York, with Denver seeing a 12-point lead shrivel to four with 1:26 to go before Denver pulled away at the end; each team shot over 60% in the final quarter and scored 82 combined points, a pro playoff record. Ralph Simpson led the scoring for Denver while playing all but two minutes due to a lack of bench with 25 points on the day. Julius Erving scored 48 points, which included 25 in the final quarter, which was reported at the time as the most point scored by one player in a quarter for a pro basketball playoff game (his 37 points scored in the second half is believed to also have been a record at the time).

May 6

Box score

Denver Nuggets 111, New York Nets 117
Scoring by quarter: 26–25, 21–25, 32–29, 32–38
| Pts: David Thompson 32; Rebs: Dan Issel 13; Asts: Chuck Williams 5 | Pts: Julius Erving 31; Rebs: Tim Bassett 12; Asts: Julius Erving 4 |
New York leads series, 2–1

Nassau Veterans Memorial Coliseum, Uniondale, New York
Attendance: 12,243
Referees: John Vanak

Julius Erving scored eight points in the final two minutes of the game, starting by giving the Nets a 111–108 lead before David Thompson soon tied the game. Erving scored a backhand layup with 31 seconds to go before a key foul changed the course of the game when Thompson was charged with an offensive foul by referee John Vanak with 23 seconds remaining and Rich Jones trying to defend Thompson. Erving sealed the game up with two subsequent free throws and then scored the last points of the game with a dunk following a Nets steal that gave him 31 points on the night as the Nets took the lead in the series; Thompson was quoted as saying this was the first time he broke down in a locker room following a game.

May 8

Box score

Denver Nuggets 112, New York Nets 121
Scoring by quarter: 34–29, 23–32, 25–28, 30–32
| Pts: Dan Issel 26; Rebs: Dan Issel 15; Asts: David Thompson 5 | Pts: Julius Erving 34; Rebs: Julius Erving 15; Asts: Julius Erving 6 |
New York leads series, 3–1

Nassau Veterans Memorial Coliseum, Uniondale, New York
Attendance: 15,934

A dominant Erving, combined with 23 points from Brian Taylor to get out of a slump, helped the Nets dominate the Nuggets after a slow first quarter while Jim Eakins came off the bench to score 13 of his 17 points in the second half, where at one point New York led by over 15 with three minutes to go.

May 11

Box score

New York Nets 110, Denver Nuggets 118
Scoring by quarter: 31–27, 22–20, 20–42, 37–29
| Pts: Julius Erving 37; Rebs: Julius Erving 15; Asts: Julius Erving 5 | Pts: Ralph Simpson 21; Rebs: Dan Issel 11; Asts: Chuck Williams 5 |
New York leads series, 3–2

McNichols Sports Arena, Denver, Colorado
Attendance: 18,881

Earlier in the day, the Virginia Squires had folded operations due to them making a failed pay assessment of $75,000 to the ABA alongside them failing to reimburse their own players with $120,000 in back pay, thus leaving the ABA with only six competing teams left by the end of the playoffs. However, since the Squires didn't even play in the ABA Playoffs that year, the ABA resumed their championship series as planned. The Nets, being poised to clinch the championship, led by 16 points with five minutes left to go in the second quarter, but Denver utilized a late push to narrow it to a six-point deficit at halftime before outshooting and outscoring the Nets with accurate shooting (13-of-19) to score 42 points in the third quarter; Chuck Williams and David Thompson scored 19 combined points in the quarter as Denver forced a Game 6 back in Uniondale.

May 13

Box score

Denver Nuggets 106, New York Nets 112
Scoring by quarter: 28–23, 30–22, 34–33, 14–34
| Pts: David Thompson 42; Rebs: Dan Issel 20; Asts: Towe, Jones 5 each | Pts: Julius Erving 31; Rebs: Julius Erving 19; Asts: Julius Erving 5 |
New York wins series, 4–2

Nassau Veterans Memorial Coliseum, Uniondale, New York
Attendance: 15,934

New York trailed by 22 points late in the third quarter with 5:07 remaining in the third quarter. However, with the efforts of mounting a run by blitzing full‐court press called "Yellow" by head coach Kevin Loughery, the Nets rallied all the way back. John Williamson at one point scored 11 points straight that saw the deficit go to 96–92 with eight minutes remaining in the game. With Denver still leading 104–97, New York made their push with an 11–0 run in just over two minutes. Williamson scored 16 points in the fourth quarter, which included his jump shot to give New York the lead at last.

As of 2024, it is the last championship for the franchise. The Nets would not reach another championship final of any kind until 2002 while the Nuggets did not reach a final until 2023. With his prior championship in 1974, Kevin Loughery became the second ABA coach to win multiple championships as a coach, joining Bobby Leonard. New York received $95,000 ($25,000 for their 2nd-place finish and $70,000 for the playoffs) while Denver received $81,000. The championship trophy awarded to the Nets was the same silver trophy they won in 1974, as the new $800 silver bowl planned to be presented to the champion was stolen from league commissioner Dave DeBusschere the previous week.

Denver had three members of its team make the Naismith Basketball Hall of Fame: Dan Issel (1993), David Thompson (1996), and Bobby Jones (2019), along with their head coach Larry Brown (2002), while New York saw Julius Erving inducted (1993).

== Statistical leaders ==
| Category | Total | | | Average | | | |
| Category | Player | Team | Total | Player | Team | Avg. | Games played |
|---|---|---|---|---|---|---|---|
| Points | Julius Erving | New York Nets | 451 | Julius Erving | New York Nets | 34.7 | 13 |
| Rebounds | George McGinnis | Indiana Pacers | 164 | Artis Gilmore | Kentucky Colonels | 15.2 | 10 |
| Assists | Louie Dampier | Kentucky Colonels | 77 | Don Buse | Indiana Pacers | 8.7 | 3 |
| Steals | Brian Taylor | New York Nets | 26 | Mike Gale | San Antonio Spurs | 3.4 | 7 |
| Blocks | Artis Gilmore | Kentucky Colonels | 36 | Artis Gilmore | Kentucky Colonels | 3.6 | 10 |

=== Total leaders ===
Points

1. Julius Erving - 451
2. David Thompson - 343
3. Dan Issel - 266
4. Ralph Simpson - 257
5. Artis Gilmore - 242

Rebounds

1. Julius Erving - 164
2. Dan Issel - 156
3. Artis Gilmore - 152
4. Bobby Jones - 112
5. Maurice Lucas - 108

Assists

1. Louie Dampier - 77
2. Ralph Simpson - 73
3. Julius Erving - 64
4. Bird Averitt - 61
5. Bobby Jones - 59

Minutes

1. Julius Erving - 551
2. Ralph Simpson - 542
3. David Thompson - 508
4. Brian Taylor - 475
5. Dan Issel - 470
