= 1973–74 ABA season =

- League: American Basketball Association
- Sport: Basketball
- Duration: October 10, 1973 – May 10, 1974
- Games: 84
- Teams: 10

Regular season
- Top seed: New York Nets
- Season MVP: Julius Erving (New York)
- Top scorer: Julius Erving (New York)

Playoffs
- Eastern champions: New York Nets
- Eastern runners-up: Kentucky Colonels
- Western champions: Utah Stars
- Western runners-up: Indiana Pacers

Finals
- Champions: New York Nets
- Runners-up: Utah Stars

ABA seasons
- ← 1972–73 1974–75 →

The 1973–74 ABA season was the seventh season of the American Basketball Association. The 1973 ABA draft would utilize four different draft formats throughout multiple months that the nine ABA teams went through during the offseason period before officially starting this season. The New York Nets won the ABA championship, 4 games to 1, over the Utah Stars.

Only one franchise move occurred from the previous season, and it stayed in its original state. The Dallas Chaparrals were purchased by a group called "Professional Sports, Inc." led by Angelo Drossos, John Schaefer, and Red McCombs and were moved to San Antonio and renamed to become the San Antonio Spurs after originally being planned to be the San Antonio Gunslingers, with them still being the Spurs in the present day after initially having it be a unique deal where the team could return to Dallas (likely to become the Chaparrals once again) by 1975 if they weren't bought outright by then. One thing that helped their standing with the locals early on was having their venue offering both Coca-Cola and Pepsi products when most other teams had to offer one or the other due to licensing issues. However, what helped get the Spurs see long-term success (to the point of getting Drossos, Schaefer, and McCombs to officially buy out the original Chaparrals owners and own the Spurs as a long-term franchise properly this season) was having them acquire key players from the Virginia Squires in rookie Swen Nater and George Gervin through trades in order to help the latter team out with their own financial struggles (though those same financial struggles that Virginia tried to get out of by trading key players would later do them in for their chances of survival in the next few seasons afterward).

Coaching changes
Offseason
Team	1972–73 coach	1973–74 coach
Kentucky Colonels	Joe Mullaney	Babe McCarthy
Memphis Tams	Bob Bass	Butch van Breda Kolff
New York Nets	Lou Carnesecca	Kevin Loughery
San Antonio Spurs	Dave Brown	Tom Nissalke
San Diego Conquistadors	K. C. Jones	Wilt Chamberlain
Utah Stars	LaDell Anderson	Joe Mullaney

== Teams ==
1973–74 American Basketball Association
Division	Team	City	Arena	Capacity
Eastern	Carolina Cougars	Greensboro, North Carolina; Charlotte, North Carolina; Raleigh, North Carolina	Greensboro Coliseum; Charlotte Coliseum; Dorton Arena	15,000; 9,605; 7,610
Eastern	Kentucky Colonels	Louisville, Kentucky	Freedom Hall	16,664
Eastern	Memphis Tams	Memphis, Tennessee	Mid-South Coliseum	10,085
Eastern	New York Nets	Uniondale, New York	Nassau Veterans Memorial Coliseum	13,571
Eastern	Virginia Squires	Old Dominion University Fieldhouse; Hampton Coliseum; Richmond Arena; Salem Civic Center; Roanoke Civic Center	Norfolk, Virginia; Hampton, Virginia; Richmond, Virginia; Salem, Virginia; Roanoke, Virginia	5,200; 9,777; 6,000; 6,820; 9,828
Western	Denver Rockets	Denver, Colorado	Denver Auditorium Arena	6,841
Western	Indiana Pacers	Indianapolis, Indiana	Indiana State Fair Coliseum	10,000
Western	San Antonio Spurs	San Antonio, Texas	Hemisfair Arena	10,146
Western	San Diego Conquistadors	San Diego, California	Golden Hall	3,200
Western	Utah Stars	Salt Lake City, Utah	Salt Palace	12,166

=== Map of teams ===
Eastern Division Western Division

== Final standings ==
=== Eastern Division ===
Team	W	L	PCT.	GB
**New York Nets** *	55	29	.655	—
Kentucky Colonels *	53	31	.631	2
Carolina Cougars *	47	37	.560	8
Virginia Squires *	28	56	.333	27
Memphis Tams	21	63	.250	34

=== Western Division ===
Team	W	L	PCT.	GB
Utah Stars *	51	33	.607	—
Indiana Pacers *	46	38	.548	5
San Antonio Spurs *	45	39	.536	6
San Diego Conquistadors *	37	47	.440	14
Denver Rockets *	37	47	.440	14

Asterisk (*) denotes playoff team (the Conquistadors and the Rockets played a one-game playoff to settle the tie for the final playoff spot, which the Conquistadors won)

Bold – ABA champions

== Regular season ==
Julius Erving was named league MVP with 49 votes to Artis Gilmore's nine votes.

== Awards and honors ==
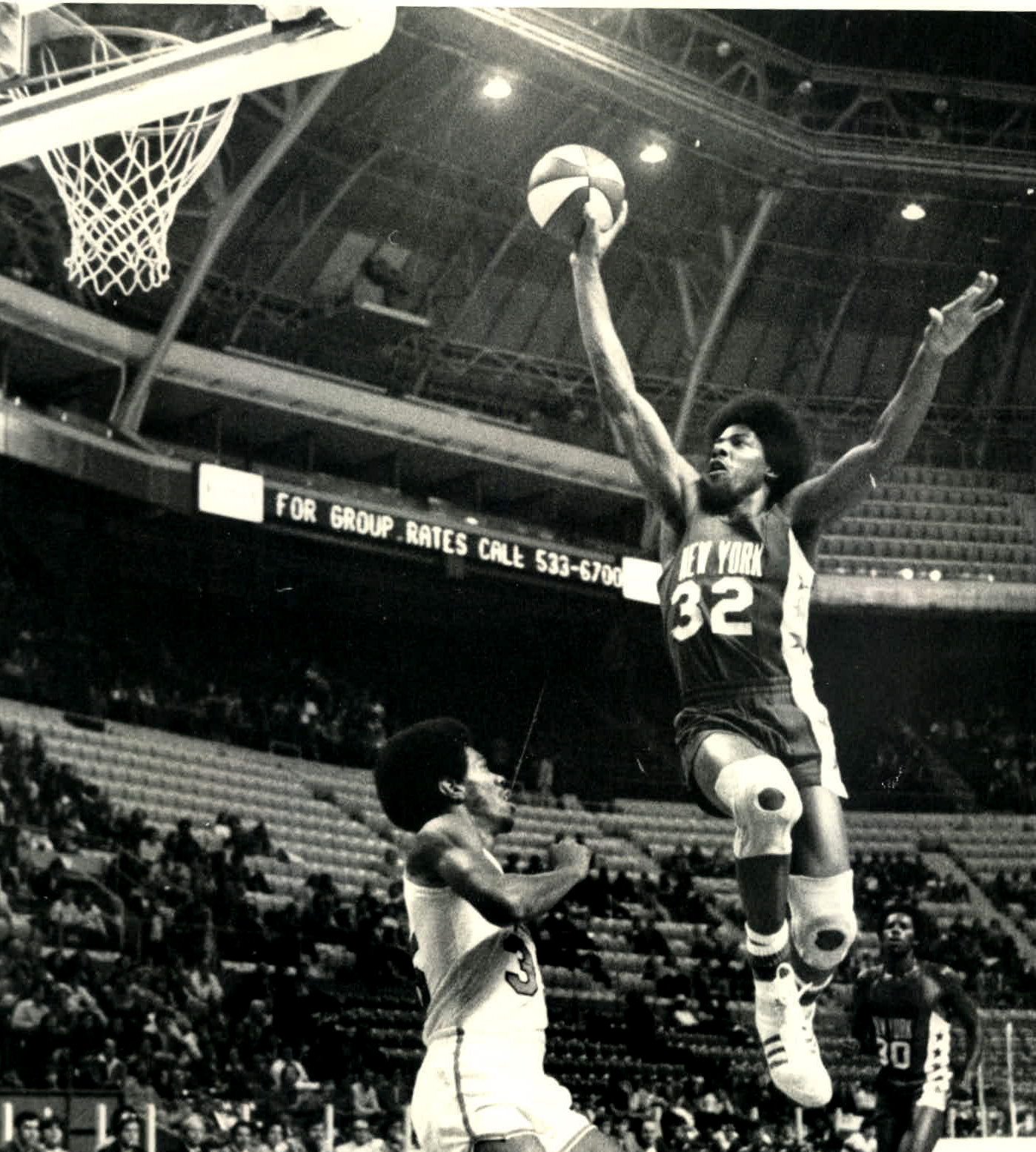
Julius "Dr. J" Erving (New York) won the ABA MVP

- ABA Most Valuable Player Award: Julius Erving, New York Nets
- Rookie of the Year: Swen Nater, San Antonio Spurs
- Coach of the Year: Babe McCarthy, Kentucky Colonels & Joe Mullaney, Utah Stars
- Playoffs MVP: Julius Erving, New York Nets
- All-Star Game MVP: Artis Gilmore, Kentucky Colonels
- Executive of the Year: Jack Ankerson, San Antonio Spurs
- **All-ABA First Team**
  - Julius Erving, New York Nets (2nd First Team selection, 3rd overall selection)
  - George McGinnis, Indiana Pacers (1st First Team selection, 2nd overall selection)
  - Artis Gilmore, Kentucky Colonels (3rd selection)
  - Jimmy Jones, Utah Stars (3rd selection)
  - Mack Calvin, Carolina Cougars (2nd First Team selection, 3rd overall selection)
- **All-ABA Second Team**
  - Dan Issel, Kentucky Colonels (3rd Second Team selection, 4th overall selection)
  - Willie Wise, Utah Stars (2nd selection)
  - Swen Nater, San Antonio Spurs
  - Ron Boone, Utah Stars
  - Louie Dampier, Kentucky Colonels (4th selection)
- **All-Defensive Team**
  - Mike Gale (2nd selection), Kentucky Colonels
  - Artis Gilmore (2nd selection), Kentucky Colonels
  - Julius Keye (2nd selection), Denver Rockets
  - Ted McClain, Carolina Cougars
  - Roland Taylor, Virginia Squires
  - Willie Wise (2nd selection), Utah Stars
- **All-Rookie Team**
  - Mike Green, Denver Rockets
  - Larry Kenon, New York Nets
  - Bo Lamar, San Diego Conquistadors
  - Swen Nater, Virginia Squires (traded to the San Antonio Spurs in November 1973)
  - John Williamson, New York Nets
