= List of ABA champions =

The American Basketball Association (ABA) Finals were the championship series of the ABA, a professional basketball league, in which two teams played each other for the title. The ABA was formed in the fall of 1967, and the first ABA Finals were played at the end of the league's first season in the spring of 1968. The league ceased operations in 1976 with the ABA–NBA merger and four teams from the ABA continued play in the National Basketball Association.

All ABA Finals were in best-of-seven format and were contested between the winners of the Eastern Division and the Western Division finals. The only teams to win the championship more than once were the Indiana Pacers and the New York Nets. The Indiana Pacers initially played in the ABA Finals in 1969, which they lost to the Oakland Oaks, but they won the championship the next year against the Los Angeles Stars. They won in the ABA Finals again in 1972, their first after moving to the Western Division, against the New York Nets and won their final ABA championship against the Kentucky Colonels in 1973. The New York Nets won their first championship in 1974 against the Utah Stars, and their second against the Denver Nuggets in 1976.

The last ABA Finals were in 1976, after which the ABA–NBA merger took place; three of the four teams that continued into the NBA made it to or won the ABA Finals.

Location of ABA Champions # titles: 1-white 2-blue 3-green *denotes did not join NBA

== Champions ==
**Bold**	Winning team of the ABA championship
Italics	Team with home-court advantage
Team (X, Y-Z)	Denotes number of times team has played in the championship (X) and record afterwards (Y–Z)

Year	Western Champion	Coach	Result	Eastern Champion	Coach	Reference
1968	New Orleans Buccaneers (1, 0–1)	Babe McCarthy	3–4	**Pittsburgh Pipers** (1, 1–0)	Vince Cazzetta	
1969	**Oakland Oaks** (1, 1–0)	Alex Hannum	4–1	Indiana Pacers (1, 0–1)	Bobby Leonard	
1970	Los Angeles Stars (1, 0–1)	Bill Sharman	2–4	**Indiana Pacers** (2, 1–1)	Bobby Leonard	
1971	**Utah Stars** (2, 1–1)	Bill Sharman	4–3	Kentucky Colonels (1, 0–1)	Frank Ramsey	
1972	**Indiana Pacers** (2) (Note: The Pacers moved from the Eastern Division to the Western Division following the 1969–70 season.) (3, 2–1)	Bobby Leonard	4–2	New York Nets (1, 0–1)	Lou Carnesecca	
1973	**Indiana Pacers** (3) (4, 3–1)	Bobby Leonard	4–3	Kentucky Colonels (2, 0–2)	Joe Mullaney	
1974	Utah Stars (3, 1–2)	Joe Mullaney	1–4	**New York Nets** (2, 1–1)	Kevin Loughery	
1975	Indiana Pacers (5, 3–2)	Bobby Leonard	1–4	**Kentucky Colonels** (3, 1–2)	Hubie Brown	

With the ABA cut down to seven teams by the middle of its final season, the league abandoned divisional play.

Year	Higher seed	Coach	Result	Lower seed	Coach	Reference
1976	Denver Nuggets (1, 0–1)	Larry Brown	2–4	**New York Nets** (2) (3, 2–1)	Kevin Loughery	

== Results by teams ==
Teams	Finals appearances	Championships	Runners-up	Years won	Years runners-up
Indiana Pacers	5	3	2	1970, 1972, 1973	1969, 1975
New York Nets	3	2	1	1974, 1976	1972
Kentucky Colonels	3	1	2	1975	1971, 1973
Los Angeles / Utah Stars	3	1	2	1971	1970, 1974
Oakland Oaks	1	1	0	1969	—
Pittsburgh Pipers	1	1	0	1968	—
Denver Nuggets	1	0	1	—	1976
New Orleans Buccaneers	1	0	1	—	1968

== See also ==
- American Basketball Association
- ABA Playoffs MVP
- List of NBA champions
