= Fatty Taylor =

American basketball player

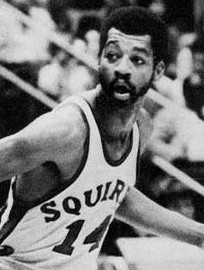

Personal information
- Born: March 13, 1946 Washington, D.C., U.S.
- Died: December 7, 2017 (aged 71) Denver, Colorado, U.S.
- Listed height: 6 ft 0 in (1.83 m)
- Listed weight: 175 lb (79 kg)

Career information
- High school: Spingarn (Washington, D.C.)
- College: Dodge City CC (1965–1967); La Salle (1967–1969)
- NBA draft: 1969: 12th round, 167th overall pick
- Drafted by: Philadelphia 76ers
- Playing career: 1969–1977
- Position: Point guard
- Number: 14, 54, 1, 21

Career history
- 1969–1974: Washington Caps / Virginia Squires
- 1974–1975: Denver Nuggets
- 1975–1976: Virginia Squires
- 1976–1977: Denver Nuggets

Career highlights
- 2× ABA All-Defensive First Team (1973, 1974)

Career ABA and NBA statistics
- Points: 5,098 (8.0 ppg)
- Rebounds: 2,524 (3.8 rpg)
- Assists: 2,563 (4.0 apg)
- Stats at NBA.com
- Stats at Basketball Reference

Roland Morris "Fatty" Taylor (March 13, 1946 – December 7, 2017) was an American professional basketball player. A 6’0" guard born in Washington, D.C., and an alum of La Salle University, Taylor joined the American Basketball Association (ABA) in 1969. After one year playing for the Washington Capitals, he moved on to the Virginia Squires, with whom he spent the prime of his career, tallying 3,495 points, 1,737 assists, and 1,715 rebounds in five seasons. Taylor became known as one of the few outstanding defensive players in a league known primarily for a "run-and-gun" style. On the Squires Taylor played with former or later NBA stars including Adrian Smith, "Jumbo" Jim Eakins and Julius "Doctor J" Erving. For one-and-a-half seasons Taylor was a teammate of George Gervin, and Taylor has been credited with coining Gervin's nickname "The Iceman" (he first called Gervin "Iceberg Slim", which gradually developed into the more familiar nickname). Taylor spent one season in the NBA (1976–77) as a member of the Denver Nuggets, and he retired in 1977 with combined ABA/NBA totals of 5,098 points, 2,563 assists, and 2,524 rebounds.

== Cancer and death ==
In 2000, Taylor was diagnosed with male breast cancer after his doctor's fill-in found that one of his nipples was inverted. One day after being diagnosed, Taylor went into surgery and ended up having a mastectomy. In 2011, he was found to have many blood clots in his chest and that the cancer had recurred in his lungs and bones, which Taylor had treatment for soon after. In July 2015, he found that cancer had spread into his pelvis and he had many complications afterward.

Fatty Taylor died from the complications on December 7, 2017, at the age of 71.

== Career statistics ==
Legend
GP	Games played	GS	Games started	MPG	Minutes per game
FG%	Field goal percentage	3P%	3-point field goal percentage	FT%	Free throw percentage
RPG	Rebounds per game	APG	Assists per game	SPG	Steals per game
BPG	Blocks per game	PPG	Points per game	**Bold**	Career high
*	Led the league

=== ABA/NBA ===
==== Regular season ====
Year	Team	GP	MPG	FG%	3P%	FT%	RPG	APG	SPG	BPG	PPG
1969–70	Washington (ABA)	83	24.0	**.467**	.167	.674	4.5	2.4			8.0
1970–71	Virginia (ABA)	**84**	19.4	.458	.182	.684	3.1	2.7			6.4
1971–72	Virginia (ABA)	**84**	31.8	.450	.067	.636	**5.0**	3.8			9.3
1972–73	Virginia (ABA)	78	32.7	.465	**.429**	.605	4.1	4.8	**2.7***		**10.1**
1973–74	Virginia (ABA)	80	**35.2**	.412	.158	.723	4.7	5.2	**2.7**	**.2**	9.7
1974–75	Denver (ABA)	76	26.6	.428	.286	**.750**	2.9	4.4	2.3	**.2**	8.4
1975–76	Virginia (ABA)	76	32.7	.405	.216	.723	4.5	**5.3**	**2.7**	**.2**	8.2
1976–77	Denver	79	19.6	.420		.569	2.7	3.6	1.7	.1	3.8
Career (ABA)		561	28.8	.439	.206	.680	4.1	4.1	2.6	.2	8.6
Career (overall)		640	27.7	.438	.206	.676	3.9	4.0	2.4	.2	8.0

==== Playoffs ====
Year	Team	GP	MPG	FG%	3P%	FT%	RPG	APG	SPG	BPG	PPG
1970	Washington (ABA)	7	18.4	**.455**	–	–	3.1	2.7			1.4
1971	Virginia (ABA)	12	17.8	.425	.000	.679	3.1	2.3			4.4
1972	Virginia (ABA)	11	**34.7**	.443	.333	.667	**5.2**	4.1			**10.5**
1973	Virginia (ABA)	5	33.8	.342	**.500**	**.933**	4.2	2.8			8.2
1974	Virginia (ABA)	5	33.4	.296	.167	.545	5.0	**5.0**	1.6	**.6**	7.8
1975	Denver (ABA)	**13**	21.2	.453	.000	.789	2.9	2.8	**2.1**	.2	5.6
1977	Denver	1	1.0	–		–	.0	.0	.0	.0	.0
Career (ABA)		53	25.2	.406	.214	.718	3.8	3.2	1.9	.3	6.2
Career (overall)		54	24.8	.406	.214	.718	3.7	3.1	1.8	.3	6.1
