= 1970–71 Virginia Squires season =

ABA basketball team season

- Division champions
- Head coach: Al Bianchi
- Arena: Old Dominion University Fieldhouse; Hampton Coliseum; Richmond Coliseum; Richmond Arena; Norfolk Scope; Salem Civic Center; Roanoke Civic Center

Results
- Record: 55–29 (.655)
- Place: Division: 1st (Eastern)
- Playoff finish: Lost in Division Finals

Local media
- Television: WAVY 10
- Radio: WTAR

The 1970–71 Virginia Squires season was the fourth season of the franchise and the first season for the state of Virginia in the American Basketball Association. After two seasons played as the Oakland Oaks (the second of which resulted in them winning the ABA Finals Championship) and one season played as the Washington Caps, owner Earl Foreman was convinced by the ABA to move his team from Washington, D.C. to the nearby state of Virginia. Like the Carolina Cougars before them and both "The Floridians" and Texas Chaparrals alongside them at the time, the Squires played their games as a regional franchise, primarily playing games in the cities of Norfolk, Hampton and Richmond, with Salem and Roanoke having occasional games as well. The Squires started play there on October 17, 1970, in the city of Norfolk, winning 133–116 over the Pittsburgh Condors. They then proceeded to win their next five games while having a 30–12 first half of the season, which was highlighted by a seven-game winning streak along the way. However, they then went 25–17 in the second half of the season, though they never lost more than two games in a row throughout the regular season. They finished the season first in points scored at 123.3 per game and 7th in points allowed at 119.7 per game. In the 1971 ABA Playoffs, they beat their new stateside rivals in the Kentucky Colonels in six games to advance to the Eastern Division Finals, but they were beaten in six games themselves by the New York Nets, who would lose the championship series to the Utah Stars that year.

Before the season began for the Squires, on September 1, the Squires traded an unhappy Rick Barry to the New York Nets for $200,000 cash (with Barry claiming to have offered up more money for the Squires to leave the team himself instead). His unhappiness to the idea of playing in Virginia related to the notion of folksy life not appealing to him, with his ideal locations to play in at the time being in either California (which involved the risk of him returning to the Golden State Warriors of the rivaling NBA) or New York. Offsetting this loss for them, however, was rookie guard Charlie Scott from the University of North Carolina. Scott averaged 27.1 points per game during his rookie season in Virginia and was co-named the ABA's Rookie of the Year alongside Dan Issel of the Kentucky Colonels.

== Roster ==
1970–71 Virginia Squires roster
Players

Pos.	No.	Player	Height	Weight	DOB	From
PG	20	Mike Barrett	6 ft 2 in (1.88 m)	155 lb (70 kg)	September 5, 1943	West Virginia Tech
PG	11	Larry Brown	5 ft 9 in (1.75 m)	160 lb (73 kg)	September 14, 1940	North Carolina
SF	16	Bill Bunting	6 ft 8 in (2.03 m)	200 lb (91 kg)	August 26, 1947	North Carolina
F	34	Frank Card	6 ft 7 in (2.01 m)	195 lb (88 kg)	December 28, 1944	South Carolina State
SF	40	George Carter	6 ft 4 in (1.93 m)	210 lb (95 kg)	January 10, 1944	St. Bonaventure
C	42	Jim Eakins	6 ft 11 in (2.11 m)	215 lb (98 kg)	May 24, 1946	BYU
SF	31	George Irvine	6 ft 6 in (1.98 m)	200 lb (91 kg)	February 1, 1948	Washington
PF	24	Neil Johnson	6 ft 7 in (2.01 m)	220 lb (100 kg)	April 17, 1943	Creighton
G		Henry Logan	6 ft 0 in (1.83 m)	180 lb (82 kg)	March 14, 1946	Western Carolina
PF	34	Mike Maloy	6 ft 7 in (2.01 m)	215 lb (98 kg)	May 10, 1949	Davidson
SF	15	Doug Moe	6 ft 5 in (1.96 m)	215 lb (98 kg)	September 21, 1938	North Carolina
SG	33	Charlie Scott	6 ft 5 in (1.96 m)	175 lb (79 kg)	December 15, 1948	North Carolina
C	22	Ray Scott	6 ft 9 in (2.06 m)	215 lb (98 kg)	July 12, 1938	Portland
PG	14, 54	Roland Taylor	6 ft 0 in (1.83 m)	175 lb (79 kg)	March 13, 1946	La Salle
C		Tiny Ron Taylor	7 ft 1 in (2.16 m)	265 lb (120 kg)	November 21, 1947	USC

Coaches
Head coach
- Al Bianchi

Legend
- (DP) Unsigned draft pick
- (FA) Free agent
- (S) Suspended
- Injured

Roster

== Final standings ==
=== Eastern Division ===
Eastern Division	W	L	PCT	GB
Virginia Squires *	55	29	.655	
Kentucky Colonels *	44	40	.524	11.0
New York Nets *	40	44	.476	15.0
The Floridians *	37	47	.440	18.0
Pittsburgh Condors	36	48	.429	19.0
Carolina Cougars	34	50	.405	21.0

== ABA Playoffs ==
ABA Eastern Division Semifinals vs. New York Nets

Game	Date	Location	Score	Record	Attendance
1	April 2	Hampton (Virginia)	113–105	1–0	6,149
2	April 4	Hampton (Virginia)	114–108	2–0	7,143
3	April 6	New York	131–135	2–1	3,504
4	April 7	New York	127–130	2–2	4,134
5	April 9	Richmond (Virginia)	127–124	3–2	4,250
6	April 10	New York	118–114	4–2	3,016

Squires win series, 4–2

ABA Eastern Division Finals vs. Kentucky Colonels

Game	Date	Location	Score	Record	Attendance
1	April 15	Richmond (Virginia)	132–136	0–1	4,250
2	April 17	Norfolk (Virginia)	142–122	1–1	5,000
3	April 19	Kentucky	150–137	2–1	4,777
4	April 21	Kentucky	110–128	2–2	5,221
5	April 23	Hampton (Virginia)	107–115	2–3	10,013
6	April 24	Kentucky	117–129	2–4	12,822

Squires lose series, 4–2

== Awards and honors ==
1971 ABA All-Star Game selections (game played on January 23, 1971)

- Charlie Scott
- George Carter
- Neil Johnson

Bianchi was selected to coach the Eastern Division.

- ABA Coach of the Year: Al Bianchi
- ABA Rookie of the Year: Charlie Scott
- ABA First Team selection: Charlie Scott
