= George Carter (basketball) =

American basketball player (1944–2020)

- Carter at St. Bonaventure

Personal information
- Born: January 10, 1944 Buffalo, New York, U.S.
- Died: November 18, 2020 (aged 76) Las Vegas, Nevada, U.S.
- Listed height: 6 ft 4 in (1.93 m)
- Listed weight: 210 lb (95 kg)

Career information
- High school: Silver Creek (Silver Creek, New York)
- College: St. Bonaventure (1964–1967)
- NBA draft: 1967: 8th round, 81st overall pick
- Drafted by: Detroit Pistons
- Playing career: 1967–1977
- Position: Small forward / shooting guard
- Number: 12, 40, 35, 7, 11

Career history
- 1967: Detroit Pistons
- 1969–1971: Washington Caps / Virginia Squires
- 1971–1972: Pittsburgh Condors
- 1972: Carolina Cougars
- 1972–1973: New York Nets
- 1973–1974: Virginia Squires
- 1974–1975: Memphis Sounds
- 1975: Utah Stars
- 1976–1977: ASVEL Villeurbanne

Career highlights
- ABA All-Star (1971); No. 25 retired by St. Bonaventure Bonnies

Career NBA and ABA statistics
- Points: 8,683 (18.1 ppg)
- Rebounds: 3,243 (6.8 rpg)
- Assists: 959 (2.0 apg)
- Stats at NBA.com
- Stats at Basketball Reference

George Carter (January 10, 1944 – November 18, 2020) was an American professional basketball player and a 1971 American Basketball Association (ABA) All-Star. A standout at St. Bonaventure University, he was drafted by teams in four professional sports leagues: the NBA, ABA, AFL and MLB. His financial struggles and death in 2020 helped draw national attention to former ABA players who lacked NBA pensions, contributing to the establishment of annual recognition payments for eligible former players in 2022.

== High school career ==
Carter (No. 34) with Silver Creek's 1961 Section VI Class B championship team

Carter played at Silver Creek High School in New York, graduating in 1963. He was a two-time all-Western New York selection in basketball. He also played high school football and ran track.

In 2009, as The Buffalo News celebrated 50 years of All-Western New York (WNY) basketball selections; Carter, who was twice an All-WNY first team selection, was a second team selection for the All-time All-WNY team.

== College career ==
Carter played collegiate basketball at St. Bonaventure University.

== Professional career ==
Carter was selected by the Detroit Pistons in the eighth round of the 1967 NBA draft. He was also selected by the New Orleans Buccaneers in the 1967 ABA Draft. He was also drafted by the Buffalo Bills of the American Football League (AFL) and the New York Mets of Major League Baseball (MLB).

Carter played only one game for the Pistons, and then joined the Washington Caps of the rival American Basketball Association. He went on to play seven seasons in the ABA, spending time with eight teams: the Caps, the Virginia Squires, the Carolina Cougars, the Pittsburgh Condors, the New York Nets, the Memphis Sounds, the Baltimore Claws (preseason games only) and the Utah Stars. Carter represented the Squires in the 1971 ABA All-Star Game. He scored 8,683 combined ABA/NBA career points.

== Death ==
Carter died on November 18, 2020, in Las Vegas.

In the final year of his life, Carter faced medical bills and eviction while undergoing treatment for cancer. The nonprofit Dropping Dimes Foundation helped him, and his circumstances brought attention to the financial struggles of former ABA players who did not qualify for NBA pensions. According to the foundation's co-founder, Carter's death prompted broadcaster Bob Costas to contact NBA commissioner Adam Silver about the issue. In July 2022, the NBA and National Basketball Players Association established annual recognition payments for approximately 115 eligible former ABA players who were not covered by the NBA pension plan.

== Career statistics ==
Legend
GP	Games played	GS	Games started	MPG	Minutes per game
FG%	Field goal percentage	3P%	3-point field goal percentage	FT%	Free throw percentage
RPG	Rebounds per game	APG	Assists per game	SPG	Steals per game
BPG	Blocks per game	PPG	Points per game	**Bold**	Career high

=== NBA/ABA ===
==== Regular season ====
Year	Team	GP	MPG	FG%	3P%	FT%	RPG	APG	SPG	BPG	PPG
1967–68	Detroit (NBA)	1	5.0	**.500**		**1.000**	.0	1.0			3.0
1969–70	Washington (ABA)	67	27.6	.456	**.538**	.773	6.3	1.4			14.4
1970–71	Virginia (ABA)	81	33.6	.473	.000	.792	**8.0**	1.9			18.9
1971–72	Pittsburgh (ABA)	46	**41.0**	.429	.000	.799	7.7	2.2			**21.4**
1971–72	Carolina (ABA)	29	25.4	.461	.000	.849	5.2	.9			16.5
1972–73	N.Y. Nets (ABA)	**83**	35.9	.456	.000	.832	6.2	2.1			19.0
1973–74	Virginia (ABA)	80	35.2	.422	.344	.841	6.7	1.7	.8	.2	19.3
1974–75	Memphis (ABA)	82	37.4	.436	.270	.795	7.1	**3.1**	**1.1**	**.4**	18.4
1975–76	Utah (ABA)	10	18.0	.385	–	.780	3.1	1.5	.5	.3	8.2
Career (ABA)		478	34.0	.445	.301	.813	6.8	2.0	1.0	.3	18.2
Career (overall)		479	33.9	.445	.301	.813	6.8	2.0	1.0	.3	18.1
All-Star (ABA)		1	8.0	.667	–	.000	.0	2.0			4.0

==== Playoffs ====
Year	Team	GP	MPG	FG%	3P%	FT%	RPG	APG	SPG	BPG	PPG
1970	Washington (ABA)	3	21.7	**.524**	.000	.667	6.0	.7			8.7
1971	Virginia (ABA)	**12**	34.1	.463	.000	.815	**9.0**	2.4			19.1
1973	N.Y. Nets (ABA)	5	43.6	.500	–	.850	**9.0**	**2.6**			**21.2**
1974	Virginia (ABA)	5	40.8	.438	.111	**.864**	7.6	.8	**.8**	**.4**	20.8
1975	Memphis (ABA)	5	**44.6**	.463	**.500**	.824	7.4	2.4	.2	.2	21.0
Career (overall)		30	37.3	.466	.143	.826	8.2	2.0	.5	.3	19.0
