= Old Dominion University Fieldhouse =

Multi-purpose arena in Norfolk, Virginia

Coordinates: 36.8858°N 76.3115°W

ODU Fieldhouse
- Interactive map of ODU Fieldhouse
- Location: 4700 Powhatan Ave; Norfolk, Virginia, U.S.
- Owner: Old Dominion University
- Operator: Old Dominion University
- Capacity: 5,200

Construction
- Built: 1970
- Opened: 1970
- Closed: 2002
- Demolished: 2006

Tenants
- Old Dominion Monarchs (NCAA); 1970–2002

Norfolk (Virginia)

Old Dominion University Fieldhouse was a 5,200-seat multi-purpose arena located on the campus of Old Dominion University in Norfolk, Virginia. Opened in 1970, it was home to the Old Dominion Monarchs and Lady Monarchs college basketball teams until the 2002–03 season, when the Ted Constant Convocation Center opened. The fieldhouse was demolished in 2006.

== Basketball ==
=== Collegiate ===
The Monarchs played the majority of their home games in the arena from 1970 to 1977, before moving full-time to the Norfolk Scope from 1977 to 1990. The team returned to the Fieldhouse on a part-time basis in 1990, and played the majority of its season on-campus during the 2001–02 season, the last before moving into the Constant Center.

In 1977, it was the site of the final game of the ECAC Southern Region tournament, a National Collegiate Athletic Association (NCAA) Division I men's college basketball tournament organized by the Eastern College Athletic Conference (ECAC); the champion received a berth in the NCAA tournament.

=== Professional ===
The venue hosted the Virginia Squires of the American Basketball Association (ABA) for some games in the 1970–71 season. The Squires had played the previous season in Washington, D.C. as the Washington Caps, and the first two seasons in California as the Oakland Oaks.

== Entertainment ==
With a stage at one end, the Fieldhouse also hosted concerts, including Frank Zappa on April 22, 1980. In 2006, Tim Nolan set a world record at the venue, juggling eleven balls.

== Demolition ==
The Fieldhouse was demolished 20 years ago in 2006 and in its footprint is the ODU Recreation and Wellness Center, a 15,000-square-foot (1,400 m^{2}) multi-level fitness center. It has multiple gymnasiums and racquetball courts, an indoor track, pool, indoor climbing wall, and facilities for equipment rentals.
