= 1969–70 Washington Caps season =

- Head coach: Al Bianchi
- Arena: Uline Arena

Results
- Record: 44–40 (.524)
- Place: Division: 3rd
- Playoff finish: Lost in Division Semifinals

Local media
- Television: WTTG
- Radio: none

The 1969–70 Washington Caps season was the first and only one for the franchise in the American Basketball Association after spending their first two seasons in Oakland, California. On August 21, 1969, the Oakland Oaks moved to Washington, D.C., due to substantial financial losses despite winning the second-ever ABA championship only weeks earlier. The franchise was purchased for $2.6 million by a group led by Earl Foreman, Thomas Shaheen and Louis Diamond.

However reluctant he was, superstar forward Rick Barry was among seven members of the talented Oaks team who made the move from coast to coast. It was grossly misplaced in the Western Division, however, which resulted in a brutal travel schedule. Not only did the team have to compete against the NBA's more established Baltimore Bullets nearby, but it lacked a modern arena to attract fans and forge a home-court advantage. It played several designated home games at neutral sites, including six out in Los Angeles, nearly 2,700 miles from home.

Despite these hardships, the Caps did well enough to finish in third place with a respectable 44–40 record and earn themselves a playoff berth. From there, they faced the Denver Rockets in round one, losing in seven games despite Barry's heroic 52-point performance in Game 7 on the road. It marked the first and to date only time that a player scored as many as 50 points in a seventh game at either the ABA or NBA level. However, it was also Denver's first playoff series they won in franchise history, as well as the only playoff series they won while using the Rockets team name.

In anticipation of an ABA–NBA merger that would take years to officially complete, Foreman was encouraged to move the team from Washington, D.C. in order to help placate the Bullets after the season ended. For the third time in as many years, the franchise played in a different state in the 1969-70 campaign, this time as a regional team known as Virginia Squires for the rest of their existence going forward.

== Roster ==
1969–70 Washington Caps roster
Players

Pos.	No.	Player	Height	Weight	DOB	From
SG	20	Mike Barrett	6 ft 0 in (1.83 m)	155 lb (70 kg)	September 5, 1943	West Virginia Tech
SF	24	Rick Barry	6 ft 7 in (2.01 m)	205 lb (93 kg)	March 28, 1944	Miami (FL)
PF	30	Gary Bradds	6 ft 8 in (2.03 m)	210 lb (95 kg)	July 26, 1942	Ohio State
PG	11	Larry Brown	5 ft 9 in (1.75 m)	160 lb (73 kg)	September 14, 1940	North Carolina
PF	34	Frank Card	6 ft 7 in (2.01 m)	195 lb (88 kg)	December 28, 1944	South Carolina State
SF	40	George Carter	6 ft 4 in (1.93 m)	210 lb (95 kg)	January 10, 1944	St. Bonaventure
C	42	Jim Eakins	6 ft 11 in (2.11 m)	215 lb (98 kg)	May 24, 1946	BYU
C	33	Ira Harge	6 ft 9 in (2.06 m)	225 lb (102 kg)	March 14, 1941	New Mexico
SG	15, 31	Warren Jabali	6 ft 2 in (1.88 m)	200 lb (91 kg)	August 29, 1946	Wichita State
G	21	Hal Jeter	6 ft 0 in (1.83 m)	190 lb (86 kg)	May 17, 1945	Drake
PG	12	Henry Logan	6 ft 0 in (1.83 m)	180 lb (82 kg)	March 14, 1946	Western Carolina
PG	14, 54	Fatty Taylor	6 ft 0 in (1.83 m)	175 lb (79 kg)	March 13, 1946	La Salle
C	54	Tiny Ron Taylor	7 ft 1 in (2.16 m)	265 lb (120 kg)	November 21, 1947	USC
SF	31	George Tinsley	6 ft 5 in (1.96 m)	205 lb (93 kg)	September 19, 1946	Kentucky Wesleyan

Coaches
Head coach
- Al Bianchi

Legend
- (DP) Unsigned draft pick
- (FA) Free agent
- (S) Suspended
- Injured

Roster

== Final standings ==
=== Western Division ===
Western Division	W	L	PCT	GB
Denver Rockets *	51	33	.607	—
Dallas Chaparrals *	45	39	.536	6.0
Washington Caps *	44	40	.524	7.0
Los Angeles Stars *	43	41	.512	8.0
New Orleans Buccaneers	42	42	.500	9.0

== ABA Playoffs ==
ABA Western Division Semifinals vs. Denver Rockets

Game	Date	Opponent	Score	Attendance	Record
1	April 17	@ Denver	L 111–130	9,822	0–1
2	April 18	@ Denver	L 133–143	9,889	0–2
3	April 19	Denver	W 125–120	1,748	1–2
4	April 22	Denver	W 131–114	5,497	2–2
5	April 23	@ Denver	L 110–132	7,141	2–3
6	April 25	Denver	W 116–111	3,186	3–3
7	April 28	@ Denver	L 119–143	9,893	3–4

Caps lose series, 4–3

== Awards, records, and honors ==
1970 ABA All-Star Game played on January 24, 1970

- Rick Barry
- Warren Jabali
- Larry Brown
