= 1975–76 Utah Stars season =

Aborted ABA basketball team season

- Head coach: Tom Nissalke
- Arena: Salt Palace

Results
- Record: 4–12 (.250)
- Place: Division: n/a (Western); Conference: n/a
- Playoff finish: Folded early into the season

Local media
- Television: KSL 5
- Radio: KALL

The 1975–76 Utah Stars season was the sixth and final season of the Utah Stars in the American Basketball Association, as well as the ninth and final season of the franchise when including the few seasons they had under the Anaheim Amigos and Los Angeles Stars team names while out in nearby California. They folded due to financial pressures from the team's ownership sixteen games into the regular season (winning only four games in late 1975 on October 31 against the Virginia Squires, November 12 against the eventual ABA champion New York Nets, and their final two games played on November 27 and November 29 against the Kentucky Colonels and the Spirits of St. Louis respectively) after a failed attempt by team owner Bill Daniels to become the governor of the nearby state of Colorado. The Stars would try and save themselves by merging their club with the also struggling Spirits of St. Louis franchise during the month of November 1975, but talks fell apart with the Spirits saving themselves that season and the Stars folded operations on December 2, 1975, with the ABA abandoning division play entirely for the rest of the season afterward as well. As a result, the Stars alongside the previously folded San Diego Sails and Baltimore Claws were not part of the ABA–NBA merger that occurred by the conclusion of the season in June 1976, which later featured the Virginia Squires as the final folded team to not make it to the merger talks despite that team actually completing their regular season period (albeit with only 83 games played to their name that season as opposed to the 84 total games that every other team that survived that season had at the time). Professional basketball would return to the Salt Lake City area three years after the Stars folded when the New Orleans Jazz of the National Basketball Association relocated there following the 1978–79 season to become the Utah Jazz.

== Offseason ==
=== ABA Draft ===
| Round | Pick | Player | Position(s) | Nationality | College |
|---|---|---|---|---|---|
| 1 | 6 | Steve Green | SF | United States | Indiana |
| 2 | 16 | Norm Cook | SF | United States | Kansas |
| 6 | 56 | Otis Johnson | C | United States | John B. Stetson University |
| 7 | 66 | Tim van Blommesteyn | G | United States | Princeton |
| 8 | 76 | Kirk Bruce | SG | United States | Pittsburgh |

The Stars would have the least amount of draft picks in this year's draft because of them trading away their third, fourth, and fifth round picks without gaining any new draft picks back since the Stars primarily wanted financial compensation on their ends.

=== Preseason transactions ===
- May 1975: Stars sign Steve Green

=== Preseason exhibition games ===
Like most ABA teams, the Stars played several preseason exhibition games against NBA opponents. Their first for the 1975 preseason came on October 1, 1975, against the Philadelphia 76ers. The two teams met in the 76ers' home arena and the 76ers prevailed, 116–111.

On October 7 the Stars hosted the Seattle SuperSonics. The two teams combined for 119 shots from the free-throw line. Ron Boone scored 23 points and led all scorers. Seattle's Leonard Gray was ejected for punching Utah's Steve Green. The Stars won, 122–119.

On October 11, 1975, the Kansas City–Omaha Kings met the Stars in the Denver Nuggets' home arena in Colorado. The game was part of a double-header, with the Nuggets facing the NBA's Golden State Warriors in the other half. 17,018 fans attended, which at the time was a record crowd for a basketball game in Colorado. Ron Boone led the Stars with 40 points (18 of them in the first quarter) and the Stars defeated the Kings 114–111.

On October 14 the Chicago Bulls came to Salt Lake City to face the Stars. The game went into overtime and the Bulls pulled it out, 122–119. In a sign of what was to come for the Stars later in the season, the Bulls later filed a lawsuit against the Stars, claiming that Utah failed to pay the Bulls a guaranteed $17,000 for playing the game at the Salt Palace.

The next day, on October 15, the Stars went on the road to face the Seattle SuperSonics again, this time in Seattle. John Roche scored 33 points for the Stars as Utah won 108–98.

On October 21, 1975, the Milwaukee Bucks came to the Salt Palace to face the Stars. Unbeknownst to anyone at the time, this would be the final exhibition game ever played between ABA and NBA teams, as the two leagues merged at the end of the season. The final ABA vs. NBA contest ended with the Stars victorious, 106–101.

== Roster ==
1975–76 Utah Stars roster
Players

| Pos. | No. | Player | Height | Weight | DOB | From |
|---|---|---|---|---|---|---|
| SG | 24 | Ron Boone | 6 ft 2 in (1.88 m) | 200 lb (91 kg) | September 6, 1946 | Idaho State |
| SF | 11, 30 | George Carter | 6 ft 4 in (1.93 m) | 210 lb (95 kg) | January 10, 1944 | St. Bonaventure |
| C | 32 | Randy Denton | 6 ft 10 in (2.08 m) | 240 lb (109 kg) | February 18, 1949 | Duke |
| SF | 33 | Dwaine Dillard | 6 ft 6 in (1.98 m) | 230 lb (104 kg) | March 9, 1949 | Eastern Michigan |
| PF | 25 | Jim Eakins | 6 ft 11 in (2.11 m) | 215 lb (98 kg) | May 24, 1946 | BYU |
| SF | 14 | Ken Gardner | 6 ft 5 in (1.96 m) | 205 lb (93 kg) | September 27, 1949 | Utah |
| SF | 34 | Steve Green | 6 ft 7 in (2.01 m) | 220 lb (100 kg) | October 4, 1953 | Indiana |
| PG | 10 | Joe Hamilton | 5 ft 10 in (1.78 m) | 160 lb (73 kg) | July 5, 1948 | North Texas |
| SF | 44 | Goo Kennedy | 6 ft 5 in (1.96 m) | 205 lb (93 kg) | August 23, 1949 | TCU |
| PG | 15 | John Roche | 6 ft 3 in (1.91 m) | 170 lb (77 kg) | September 26, 1949 | South Carolina |
| PG | 20 | Al Smith | 6 ft 1 in (1.85 m) | 185 lb (84 kg) | January 15, 1947 | Bradley |
| PF | 42 | Donald Washington | 6 ft 8 in (2.03 m) | 210 lb (95 kg) | April 22, 1952 | North Carolina |

Coaches
Head coach
- Tom Nissalke

Legend
- (DP) Unsigned draft pick
- (FA) Free agent
- (S) Suspended
- Injured

Roster

== Regular season ==
=== Season standings ===
| Team | W | L | PCT. | GB |
|---|---|---|---|---|
| Denver Nuggets * | 60 | 24 | .714 | — |
| **New York Nets** * | 55 | 29 | .655 | 5 |
| San Antonio Spurs * | 50 | 34 | .595 | 10 |
| Kentucky Colonels * | 46 | 38 | .548 | 14 |
| Indiana Pacers * | 39 | 45 | .464 | 21 |
| Spirits of St. Louis | 35 | 49 | .417 | 25 |
| Virginia Squires † | 15 | 68 | .181 | 44 |
| San Diego Sails † | 3 | 8 | .273 | — |
| Utah Stars † | 4 | 12 | .250 | — |
| Baltimore Claws † | 0 | 0 | .000 | — |

Asterisk (*) denotes playoff team
† did not survive the end of the season.
Bold – ABA champions

=== Month by Month ===
==== October 1975 ====
On October 25 the Stars opened their season at home against the San Diego Sails. 5,525 fans saw the Sails win 99–97 behind Bo Lamar's 29 points. On October 29 the Stars went on the road to play the Denver Nuggets. 9,201 fans saw the two teams set an ABA record for the most personal fouls in a game (83). Denver's David Thompson led all scorers with 28 points as the Nuggets won 122–117. October 31 saw the Stars' first victory of the season, a 123–116 home win against the Virginia Squires behind Ron Boone's 37 points. 4,560 attended, and the Stars' home attendance was clearly behind what it had been in prior years.

==== November 1974 ====
On November 1 the Stars traveled to Louisville to face the Kentucky Colonels. 7,983 saw Bird Averitt lead all scorers with 23 as Kentucky won 118–105. The next night saw the Stars on the road again and they lost to the New York Nets 123–111 with the game's high scorer being Julius Erving with 35. On November 4 the Stars hosted the Spirits of St. Louis; 3,965 watched the Stars lose 115–110. The next evening the Stars lost on the road to the San Antonio Spurs 121–117 despite Ron Boone's game-high 29 points. The next night (November 6) at home the Stars lost to the Denver Nuggets 111–105; 4,717 attended and Randy Denton led all scorers with 29.

November 12 saw the Stars win at home against the New York Nets, 134–114; Ron Boone led all scorers with 35 before 7,125 fans. November 14 saw the Stars at home again, this time before 6,995 fans, but Billy Knight scored 43 points (31 in the second half) to lead the Indiana Pacers to a 127–119 win. November 19 saw the Stars host the Pacers at home again and this time Billy Keller led all scorers with 33 as the Pacers won 130–110 in front of 9,073 fans.

November 21 saw the Stars on the road, losing to the lowly Virginia Squires 106–98 in front of 7,292 fans in Norfolk as Ticky Burden tallied a game-high 34 points. On November 23 the Stars lost on the road to the New York Nets 113–106 as Julius Erving scored 33 points before 6,664 fans.

On November 25 the Stars took the homestanding ABA Champion Kentucky Colonels to two overtimes before succumbing 125–123 before 8,477 fans. Artis Gilmore scored 45 points for Kentucky and Utah's Ron Boone had 42. Two nights later on November 27 the Stars hosted the defending champion Colonels in Salt Lake City in front of 8,233 fans and the two teams went to overtime again. Bird Averitt had 43 points for Kentucky including a 3-point field goal with one second left in regulation to send the game to overtime, but the Stars won 128–126.

On November 29 the Stars hosted the Spirits of St. Louis before 4,683 fans. The game was played amid reports that the two franchises were in negotiations to merge. Ron Boone and Maurice Lucas each scored 28 points. The Stars won 136–100. Though it was not known that night, the contest would prove to be the Utah Stars' final game.

==== December 1975 ====
The Utah franchise, beset with financial problems, had gained and lost new owners who were unable to make their payments and the team reverted to owner Bill Daniels as a result. Daniels was in poor financial shape himself by this point and had entered into negotiations with the Spirits of St. Louis about a possible merger. The merger talks were ultimately unsuccessful due to St. Louis' mayor at the time, John Poelker, guaranteeing the Spirits franchise would be allowed to finish up their season properly by any means necessary. As a result of that planned announcement combined with the Stars being unable to meet their payroll at all, on December 1, 1975, the ABA announced that the Utah Stars franchise was folding and that for the rest of the season, the ABA would abandon divisional play entirely.

Upon the Stars' dissolution the ABA allowed the franchise to sell four players (Moses Malone, Ron Boone, Randy Denton and Steve Green) to St. Louis and one player (Jim Eakins) to the Virginia Squires on December 2.

The Utah Stars were no more afterwards. The ABA merged with the NBA at the conclusion of the season, but while the Spirits of St. Louis planned to have moved to Utah to become the Utah Rockies following the end of this season had the ABA survived for another season, Salt Lake City would ultimately go without professional basketball until the NBA's New Orleans Jazz relocated there in 1979.

=== Records ===
- Most personal fouls by two teams in one game (83): Utah Stars at Denver Nuggets, October 29, 1975

== Transactions ==
=== Draft and preseason signings ===
- May 20, 1975: Stars are purchased from Bill Daniels by Snellen M. Johnson and Lyle E. Johnson
- May 1975: Stars sign Steve Green
- October 1975: Moses Malone misses the start of season due to a broken foot

=== Trades and transactions ===
- November 1975: franchise reverts to Bill Daniels as new owners fail to make required payments
- November 29, 1975: Spirits of St. Louis and Utah Stars unsuccessfully negotiated for a merger of the two franchises
- December 1, 1975: Utah Stars folded by ABA after failing to meet payroll. Moses Malone, Ron Boone, Randy Denton and Steve Green are all sold to the Spirits of St. Louis; Jim Eakins is sold off to the Virginia Squires, averting the use of a third dispersal draft for the ABA to end the 1975 year.
