= Jim Eakins =

American basketball player

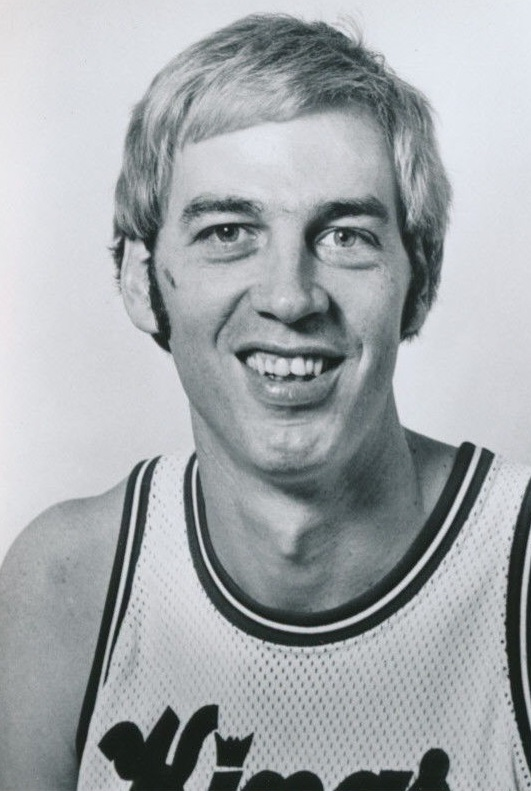
- Eakins in 1976

Personal information
- Born: May 24, 1946 (age 80) Sacramento, California, U.S.
- Listed height: 6 ft 11 in (2.11 m)
- Listed weight: 215 lb (98 kg)

Career information
- High school: Encina High School
- College: BYU (1965–1968)
- NBA draft: 1968: 5th round, 57th overall pick
- Drafted by: San Francisco Warriors
- Playing career: 1968–1978
- Position: Center
- Number: 42, 25, 33, 22, 24, 51

Career history
- 1968–1974: Oakland Oaks / Washington Caps / Virginia Squires
- 1974–1975: Utah Stars
- 1975–1976: Virginia Squires
- 1976: New York Nets
- 1976–1977: Kansas City Kings
- 1977: San Antonio Spurs
- 1978: Milwaukee Bucks

Career highlights
- 2× ABA champion (1969, 1976); ABA All-Star (1974); First-team All-WAC (1968)

Career ABA and NBA statistics
- Points: 8,255 (10.8 ppg)
- Rebounds: 5,578 (7.3 rpg)
- Blocks: 450 (1.0 bpg)
- Stats at NBA.com
- Stats at Basketball Reference

James Scott Eakins (born May 24, 1946) is an American former professional basketball player and two-time American Basketball Association champion.

== Career ==
Eakins was born on 24 May 1946 in Sacramento, California. He attended Encina High School before playing for Brigham Young University. A 6'11" center, Eakins was selected in the fifth round of the 1968 NBA draft by the San Francisco Warriors and in the 1968 ABA Draft by the Oakland Oaks.

Known as "Jimbo", Eakins played eight seasons (1968–1976) in the ABA as a member of the Oakland Oaks, Washington Caps, Virginia Squires, Utah Stars, and New York Nets. He won ABA championships in 1969 with the Oakland Oaks and in 1976 with the New York Nets. Eakins also represented Virginia in the 1974 ABA All-Star Game.

After the ABA–NBA merger in 1976, Eakins played in the NBA until 1978 as a member of the Kansas City Kings, San Antonio Spurs, and Milwaukee Bucks. In his ABA/NBA career, he scored 8,255 points and grabbed 5,578 rebounds.

After retiring from professional basketball in 1978, Eakins taught high school history and civics for 23 years.

== Career statistics ==
Legend
GP	Games played	GS	Games started	MPG	Minutes per game
FG%	Field goal percentage	3P%	3-point field goal percentage	FT%	Free throw percentage
RPG	Rebounds per game	APG	Assists per game	SPG	Steals per game
BPG	Blocks per game	PPG	Points per game	**Bold**	Career high

=== Regular season ===
Year	Team	GP	GS	MPG	FG%	3P%	FT%	RPG	APG	SPG	BPG	PPG
1968–69	Oakland	78	-	21.4	**.543**	.000	.719	7.2	0.7	-	-	13.0
1969–70	Washington	82	-	14.8	.497	.000	.741	5.0	0.9	-	-	6.4
1970–71	Virginia	**84**	-	26.6	.515	.000	.759	9.3	1.9	-	-	10.8
1971–72	Virginia	**84**	-	32.4	.486	.000	.764	**9.6**	2.2	-	-	12.3
1972–73	Virginia	83	-	30.8	.522	.000	.802	8.8	**3.2**	-	1.6	**15.0**
1973–74	Virginia	**84**	-	31.5	.520	.000	.785	**9.6**	2.8	**0.8**	1.2	14.6
1974–75	Utah	**84**	-	30.5	.503	.000	.836	7.2	1.7	0.7	1.0	12.5
1975–76	Utah	16	-	**35.5**	.439	.000	**.915**	9.4	2.1	0.6	0.6	12.7
1975–76	Virginia	23	-	27.7	.418	.000	.904	7.3	1.6	**0.8**	**1.8**	9.3
1975–76	New York	34	-	13.6	.503	.000	.848	3.5	0.5	0.2	0.6	6.2
Career		652	-	26.5	.507	.000	.783	7.9	1.8	0.6	1.2	11.7

=== Playoffs ===
Year	Team	GP	GS	MPG	FG%	3P%	FT%	RPG	APG	SPG	BPG	PPG
1968–69	Oakland	**16**	-	20.6	.537	.000	.711	6.4	0.9	-	-	11.8
1969–70	Washington	7	-	9.3	.583	.000	**1.000**	2.0	0.7	-	-	4.4
1970–71	Virginia	12	-	24.7	.505	.000	.750	10.0	1.7	-	-	10.3
1971–72	Virginia	11	-	29.5	.475	.000	.692	8.7	2.0	-	-	9.4
1972–73	Virginia	5	-	**43.4**	.593	.000	.824	**11.4**	3.6	-	-	**24.8**
1973–74	Virginia	5	-	38.0	.521	.000	.788	10.8	**3.8**	1.4	0.8	20.0
1974–75	Utah	6	-	32.3	**.636**	.000	.917	6.2	1.2	**1.5**	**1.8**	13.5
1975–76	New York	13	-	21.6	.536	.000	.806	6.0	0.8	0.5	0.5	6.8
Career		75	-	25.3	.540	.000	.761	7.4	1.6	0.9	0.9	11.2

=== Regular season ===
Year	Team	GP	GS	MPG	FG%	3P%	FT%	RPG	APG	SPG	BPG	PPG
1976–77	Kansas City	**82**	-	**16.3**	.449	-	.847	**4.4**	**1.5**	**0.4**	**0.6**	**6.0**
1977–78	San Antonio	16	-	15.7	**.577**	-	**.853**	2.9	1.1	0.2	**0.6**	5.6
1977–78	Milwaukee	17	-	9.1	.412	-	.808	1.7	0.7	0.2	0.4	2.9
Career		115	-	15.2	.462	-	.844	3.8	1.3	0.3	0.6	5.5

=== Playoffs ===
Year	Team	GP	GS	MPG	FG%	3P%	FT%	RPG	APG	SPG	BPG	PPG
1977–78	Milwaukee	**3**	-	**6.0**	**.200**	-	.000	**0.3**	**0.3**	**0.3**	0.0	**0.7**
Career		3	-	6.0	.200	-	.000	0.3	0.3	0.3	0.0	0.7
