= 1973–74 Virginia Squires season =

ABA basketball team season

- Head coach: Al Bianchi
- Arena: Norfolk Scope; Hampton Coliseum; Richmond Coliseum

Results
- Record: 28–56 (.333)
- Place: Division: 4th (Eastern)
- Playoff finish: Lost in the Eastern Division Semifinals

The 1973–74 Virginia Squires season was the fourth season of the Squires in the American Basketball Association and the seventh season in the franchise's history when including the seasons played as the Oakland Oaks and Washington Caps. The team finished 6th in points scored at 106.3 points per game and 9th in points allowed at 111.3 points per game. The team was 15–27 midway through the season, but then went 13–29 in the second half of the season. Their biggest losing streak was 6 games, with their highest winning streak being 3 games, done twice. Despite these problems, they clinched the fourth and final playoff spot over the Memphis Tams by 7 games. The Squires lost to Julius Erving and the eventual champion New York Nets in the Semifinals in 5 games. The money troubles that had troubled the franchise throughout most of the franchise's existence (specifically ever since the period after the Oakland Oaks won the 1969 ABA Finals championship that saw them move to Washington, D.C. in the first place) meant that the Squires were forced to trade away pivotal players of the franchise in order to provide short-term stability through monetary means. The franchise's biggest star player, Julius Erving, was traded along with Willie Sojourner to the New York Nets for one-time former ABA All-Star George Carter and cash before the season started. Then during the season, rookie center Swen Nater was traded on November 21, 1973 to the San Antonio Spurs for $300,000 in cash. On the night of the 1974 ABA All-Star Game, it was announced that the Squires sold George Gervin to the San Antonio Spurs for $225,000 (though the agreement was planned a month or so after the deal involving Swen Nater in order to get people attending the ABA All-Star Game in Virginia that year). Gervin's last game with the team was on February 1, but a court battle delayed his play with the Spurs, though it was all settled in favor of the Spurs by March 3. This was the last season the Squires made it to the playoffs, as they went into a tailspin for the next two seasons, winning only 15 games and losing over 60 games in each season afterward.

== ABA Draft ==
Interestingly, this year's ABA draft would involve four different types of drafts throughout the early 1973 year: a "Special Circumstances Draft" on January 15, a "Senior Draft" on April 25, an "Undergraduate Draft" also on April 25, and a "Supplemental Draft" on May 18. As such, the following selections were made in these respective drafts by the Squires.

=== ABA Special Circumstances Draft ===
Round	Pick	Player	Position(s)	Nationality	College / Club
1	10	George Gervin	SG/SF	United States	Pontiac Chaparrals (CBA)
2	20	Barry Parkhill	SG	United States	Virginia

Both of the Squires' selections they made in January's "Special Circumstances Draft" are considered interesting selections for different reasons. For George Gervin's selection, not only was he one of only two players drafted in the 1973 ABA draft system to not come directly out of college due to Gervin playing for the Pontiac Chaparrals in the original Continental Basketball Association after previously being suspended from Eastern Michigan University early in his sophomore year (which likely prompted the ABA to implement the return of their "Special Circumstances Draft" in a new and improved manner for the month of January 1973 after previously having it be a dud of sorts back in late 1971), but he was also the only player from the "Special Circumstances Draft" to actually play for the team he was first drafted from before the 1972–73 ABA season ended due to Gervin's unique status as a semi-professional player being drafted by the ABA at the time of that specific draft, meaning Gervin wouldn't be considered a rookie player for the Squires during this specific season of play. As for Barry Parkhill, he was actually previously drafted by the Squires back in the 1971 ABA draft, but Parkhill alongside Tom Riker and Jim Chones were three players drafted by the Squires from that specific draft to later be considered invalid picks by the ABA due to unwritten stipulations where ABA teams couldn't draft anymore college underclassmen back when the ABA-NBA merger was first projected to occur in the early 1970's instead of by 1976 (when it actually, officially happened following a lawsuit the NBA had involving Oscar Robertson), which led to the Squires walking those selections back while the three players returned to college that year. However, unlike the other two players, Parkhill was the only player out of the three original 1971 draft choices to get selected by the Squires once again by 1973, with Parkhill also deciding to play for the Squires, just like Gervin did a season earlier, for good measure.

=== ABA Senior Draft ===
Round	Pick	Player	Position(s)	Nationality	College / Team
1	5	Allan Bristow	SF	United States	Virginia Tech
2	15	Allie McGuire	SG	United States	Marquette
3	25	Caldwell Jones	PF/C	United States	Albany State
4	35	Bob Lauriski	F	United States	Utah State
5	45	Pete Perry	C	United States	Pan American College
6	55	Aron Stewart	SG	United States	Richmond (redshirt)
7	65	Ruben Montanez	G	Puerto Rico	Duquesne
8	75	Walt McGrary	F	United States	Chattanooga (redshirt)
9	85	Phil Chenier	SG	United States	Baltimore Bullets (NBA)
10	95	Joe Caffeyky	G	United States	North Carolina State

The "Senior Draft" done in April is often considered the official, main draft period of the 1973 ABA draft by basketball historians. Not only that, but this "Senior Draft" made by the Squires is notable for a few interesting reasons as well. First, their "Senior Draft" contains the only ABA player to have ever made it to the ABA All-Star Game that was selected in that particular draft in Caldwell Jones. Second, two of the players that the Squires selected in Aron Stewart and Walt McGrary would return to their respective colleges for one more year, meaning they would technically be considered ineligible selections if it weren't for the fact that they could already be considered redshirt senior students also. Third, and arguably most notably, the Squires would select Phil Chenier directly from the NBA's Baltimore Bullets (who would soon afterward become the Capital Bullets and then the Washington Bullets before eventually becoming the Washington Wizards by the late 1990s since then) after the ABA already previously had a team select him in their "Special Circumstances Draft" in 1971 and he decided not to play for the ABA that time, even though he wouldn't be considered a "senior" properly due to him playing professional basketball in the rivaling NBA instead of at the University of California like he was supposed to have been at the time. Not only did this mark the second time this year that the Squires would draft a player that was no longer in college and was instead playing professional basketball (in this case, for the rivaling NBA instead of a semi-professional league like the CBA was for George Gervin), but the selection of Phil Chenier by the Squires would likely get the ABA to utilize the unique opportunity to draft NBA players in the following year's draft with the "1974 ABA Draft of NBA Players."

=== ABA Undergraduate Draft ===
Round	Pick	Player	Position(s)	Nationality	College
11 (1)	105 (5)	Phil Smith	SG	United States	San Francisco
12 (2)	115 (15)	John Shumate	PF/C	United States	Notre Dame

The "Undergraduate Draft" is considered a continuation of the "Senior Draft" that was done earlier that same day, hence the numbering of the rounds and draft picks here.

=== ABA Supplemental Draft ===
Round	Pick	Player	Position(s)	Nationality	College
1	7	Willie Calvert	C	United States	Abilene Christian
2	15	Don Johnson	F	United States	Lebanon Valley College
3	23	Greg Hawkins	F	United States	North Carolina State
4	30	Mike Allocco	F	United States	Stonehill College
5	36	Alan Shaw	C	United States	Duke
6	43	Howard White	G	United States	Maryland
7	49	Darrell Brown	F	United States	Maryland
8	55	Linwood Johnson	PF/C	United States	Virginia State University

None of the eight players selected in the "Supplemental Draft" would ever play for the Squires or anyone else in the ABA once this draft concluded in May.

== Roster ==
1973–74 Virginia Squires roster
Players

Pos.	No.	Player	Height	Weight	DOB	From
SG	34	Mike Barr	6 ft 3 in (1.91 m)	180 lb (82 kg)	October 19, 1950	Duquesne
C	31	Roger Brown	6 ft 11 in (2.11 m)	225 lb (102 kg)	February 23, 1950	Kansas
SF	35	George Carter	6 ft 4 in (1.93 m)	210 lb (95 kg)	January 10, 1944	St. Bonaventure
C	25	Jim Eakins	6 ft 11 in (2.11 m)	215 lb (98 kg)	May 24, 1946	BYU
SF		Scott English	6 ft 6 in (1.98 m)	205 lb (93 kg)	October 20, 1950	UTEP
SG	44	George Gervin	6 ft 7 in (2.01 m)	180 lb (82 kg)	April 27, 1952	Eastern Michigan
SF	30	George Irvine	6 ft 6 in (1.98 m)	200 lb (91 kg)	February 1, 1948	Washington
PF	12	Jim Ligon	6 ft 7 in (2.01 m)	210 lb (95 kg)	February 22, 1944	Kokomo High School
SG	4	Larry Miller	6 ft 4 in (1.93 m)	190 lb (86 kg)	April 4, 1946	North Carolina
C	31	Swen Nater	6 ft 11 in (2.11 m)	240 lb (109 kg)	January 14, 1950	UCLA
SG	40	Barry Parkhill	6 ft 4 in (1.93 m)	185 lb (84 kg)	May 10, 1951	Virginia
PF	5	Cincy Powell	6 ft 7 in (2.01 m)	220 lb (100 kg)	February 25, 1942	Portland
PG	14	Roland Taylor	6 ft 0 in (1.83 m)	175 lb (79 kg)	March 13, 1946	La Salle
PG	13	Dave Twardzik	6 ft 1 in (1.85 m)	175 lb (79 kg)	September 20, 1950	Old Dominion
SG	11	Bernie Williams	6 ft 3 in (1.91 m)	175 lb (79 kg)	December 30, 1945	La Salle

Coaches
Head coach
- Al Bianchi

Legend
- (DP) Unsigned draft pick
- (FA) Free agent
- (S) Suspended
- Injured

Roster

== Final standings ==
=== Eastern Division ===
Team	W	L	%	GB
New York Nets	55	29	.655	-
Kentucky Colonels	53	31	.631	2
Carolina Cougars	47	37	.560	8
Virginia Squires	28	56	.333	27
Memphis Tams	21	63	.250	34

== ABA Playoffs ==
ABA Eastern Division Semifinals

Game	Date	Location	Score	Record	Attendance
1	March 29	New York	96–108	0–1	9,784
2	April 1	New York	110–129	0–2	10,747
3	April 4	Hampton (Virginia)	116–115	1–2	2,544
4	April 7	Norfolk (Virginia)	88–116	1–3	4,220
5	April 8	New York	96–108	1–4	1,1903

Squires lose series, 4–1

== Awards and honors ==
1974 ABA All-Star Game selections (game played on January 30, 1974) at Norfolk Scope in Norfolk, Virginia

- George Gervin
- Jim Eakins
