= 1971–72 Virginia Squires season =

ABA basketball team season

- Head coach: Al Bianchi
- Arena: Norfolk Scope; Hampton Coliseum; Richmond Coliseum; Roanoke Civic Center

Results
- Record: 45–39 (.536)
- Place: Division: 2nd (Eastern)
- Playoff finish: Lost in Division Finals

The 1971–72 Virginia Squires season was the second season of the Virginia Squires in the American Basketball Association, as well as the fifth season of the franchise after previously playing as the Oakland Oaks and Washington Caps. This was the debut season of future Hall of Famer and ABA All-Time MVP Julius Erving, who the team acquired over the New York Nets (the only other ABA team to seriously inquire over his undrafted player rights as a junior college player from the University of Massachusetts) some time after the 1971 ABA draft ended. During the first half of the season, the Squires were 26–16, with a season-high five-game losing streak and a five-game winning streak mixed together in that half. However, in the second half of the season, they went 19–23, with some of those losses relating to them suddenly losing their key co-star, Charlie Scott for the rest of the season through him playing with the rivaling NBA. Just before the season ended, Charlie Scott left the team and joined the NBA's Phoenix Suns due to them completing a trade with the Boston Celtics (who held his original draft rights) for Paul Silas. The Squires finished the season as a team that was second in points scored at 118.9 per game (behind only the Pittsburgh Condors), but ninth in points allowed at 118.0 per game. Scott set the all-time ABA individual single-season scoring record by averaging 34.6 points per game. Despite them being without Charlie Scott as a key co-star to Julius Erving to end the season, in the 1972 ABA Playoffs, the Squires swept "The Floridians" franchise in what turned out to be that franchise's final games ever played (with Game 2 even being broadcast nationally on CBS), but the Squires lost to the New York Nets (who had previously upset a 68–16 Kentucky Colonels in the first round) in the Eastern Division Finals in seven games. After this season ended, the Squires stopped playing in Roanoke, electing to focus on the cities of Norfolk, Hampton, and Richmond only.

== ABA Draft ==
This draft was the first ABA draft to have a properly recorded historical note of every round in their draft available.

Round	Pick	Player	Position(s)	Nationality	College / Club
1	7	Willie Sojourner	PF/C	United States	Weber State College
1	10	Dana Lewis	C	United States	Tulsa
3	23	Austin Carr	SG	United States	Notre Dame
4	41	Dana Pagett	G	United States	USC
5	52	Tom Riker	PF/C	United States	South Carolina
6	63	Barry Parkhill	SG	United States	Virginia
7	74	Clifford Ray	PF/C	United States	Oklahoma
8	85	Bill Gerry	F	United States	Virginia
9	96	Jim Chones	PF/C	United States	Marquette
10	107	Gil McGregor	PF	United States	Wake Forest
11	118	Héctor Blondet	F	Puerto Rico	Murray State
12	128	Luis Grillo	PG	United States	Sunbury Mercuries (EBA)

This draft would be notable for the Squires for multiple reasons. First, Virginia would join the Denver Rockets as the only other ABA team to have multiple first round draft picks (despite Virginia trading one of the first round picks they first had to Denver) due to Virginia not just keeping their own first round pick at the end of the first round, but also acquiring a first round pick from the Indiana Pacers by a trade with the Kentucky Colonels back when the Squires were originally known as the Washington Caps with deals involving Warren Jabali. Second, the selections of Tom Riker, Barry Parkhill, and Jim Chones were all later considered to be ineligible draft picks by the ABA due to them being college underclassmen at the time of their selections (which was a stipulation that was held by the NBA in order for the originally planned ABA-NBA merger of 1971 to occur that year instead of by 1976 when it actually did happen), with only Parkhill being re-selected by the Squires in a later draft year. (Tom Riker would later get selected by the Carolina Cougars as the #2 pick of the 1972 ABA draft, while Jim Chones would ironically sign up with the New York Nets months after the draft ended, though they ended up losing a first round pick in the process the following year afterward.) Third, Héctor Blondet would be the only known foreign-born draft pick in the 1971 ABA draft to play in the 1972 Summer Olympics in Munich, as well as win a silver medal in the 1971 Pan American Games. Fourth, Luis Grillo would be the only player of the ABA draft to be drafted from a different basketball club in the Eastern Basketball Association (now Continental Basketball Association) by the Sunbury Mercuries instead of a regular college or university like every other player in the draft. Finally, the Squires would notably exit the draft months later with the inclusion of junior college underclassman Julius Erving from the University of Massachusetts on their roster, acquiring the future Hall of Famer and ABA All-Time MVP over the New York Nets (the only other team that had serious interest in obtaining him at the time) in exchange for them losing their first round pick in the following year's draft.

== Roster ==
1971–72 Virginia Squires roster
Players

Pos.	No.	Player	Height	Weight	DOB	From
PG	20	Mike Barrett	6 ft 2 in (1.88 m)	155 lb (70 kg)	September 5, 1943	West Virginia Tech
SF	16	Bill Bunting	6 ft 8 in (2.03 m)	200 lb (91 kg)	August 26, 1947	North Carolina
C	42	Jim Eakins	6 ft 11 in (2.11 m)	215 lb (98 kg)	May 24, 1946	BYU
SF	32	Julius Erving	6 ft 7 in (2.01 m)	210 lb (95 kg)	February 22, 1950	UMass
SF	30	George Irvine	6 ft 6 in (1.98 m)	200 lb (91 kg)	February 1, 1948	Washington
PF	24	Neil Johnson	6 ft 7 in (2.01 m)	220 lb (100 kg)	April 17, 1943	Creighton
PF	34	Mike Maloy	6 ft 7 in (2.01 m)	215 lb (98 kg)	May 10, 1949	Davidson
SF	15	Doug Moe	6 ft 5 in (1.96 m)	215 lb (98 kg)	September 21, 1938	North Carolina
G	21	Dana Pagett	6 ft 2 in (1.88 m)	180 lb (82 kg)	March 29, 1949	USC
SG	33	Charlie Scott	6 ft 5 in (1.96 m)	175 lb (79 kg)	December 15, 1948	North Carolina
C	22	Ray Scott	6 ft 9 in (2.06 m)	215 lb (98 kg)	July 12, 1938	Portland
SG	0	Adrian Smith	6 ft 1 in (1.85 m)	180 lb (82 kg)	October 5, 1936	Kentucky
C	35	Willie Sojourner	6 ft 8 in (2.03 m)	225 lb (102 kg)	September 10, 1948	Weber State
PG	14	Roland Taylor	6 ft 0 in (1.83 m)	175 lb (79 kg)	March 13, 1946	La Salle
SG	11	Bernie Williams	6 ft 3 in (1.91 m)	175 lb (79 kg)	December 30, 1945	La Salle

Coaches
Head coach
- Al Bianchi

Legend
- (DP) Unsigned draft pick
- (FA) Free agent
- (S) Suspended
- Injured

Roster

== Final standings ==
=== Eastern Division ===
Team	W	L	%	GB
Kentucky Colonels	68	16	.810	–
Virginia Squires	45	39	.536	23
New York Nets	44	40	.524	24
The Floridians	36	48	.429	32
Carolina Cougars	35	49	.417	33
Pittsburgh Condors	25	59	.298	43

== ABA Playoffs ==
ABA Eastern Division Semifinals

Game	Date	Location	Score	Record	Attendance
1	April 2	Norfolk (Virginia)	114–107 (OT)	1–0	3,770
2	April 4	Hampton (Virginia)	125–100	2–0	2,921
3	April 6	Miami-Dade (Florida)	118–113	3–0	2,965
4	April 8	Miami-Dade (Florida)	115–106	4–0	3,117

Squires win series, 4–0

ABA Eastern Division Finals vs. New York Nets

Game	Date	Location	Score	Record	Attendance
1	April 13	Richmond (Virginia)	138–91	1–0	5,526
2	April 15	Norfolk (Virginia)	115–106	2–0	10,410
3	April 24	New York	117–119	2–1	11,893
4	April 26	New York	107–118	2–2	11,164
5	April 29	Hampton (Virginia)	116–107	3–2	6,309
6	May 1	New York	136–146	3–3	11,152
7	May 4	Norfolk (Virginia)	88–94	3–4	10,410

Squires lose series, 4–3

== Awards and honors ==
1972 ABA All-Star Game selections (game played on January 29, 1972)

- Julius Erving
- Charlie Scott
