= 1972–73 New York Nets season =

ABA basketball team season

- Head coach: Lou Carnesecca
- Arena: Nassau Veterans Memorial Coliseum

Results
- Record: 30–54 (.357)
- Place: Division: 4th (Eastern (ABA))
- Playoff finish: Division semifinals (lost to Cougars 1–4)
- Stats at Basketball Reference

Local media
- Television: WOR 9
- Radio: WHN

The 1972–73 New York Nets season was the sixth season of the franchise and their fifth season using the New York Nets name while out in Long Island after starting their tenure in the American Basketball Association as the New Jersey Americans due to various plans for team names falling out of favor and not working out for the team before their inaugural season began. After previously making it to the 1972 ABA Finals despite having a 44–40 record that season, the Nets would see a 14-game setback in terms of their overall production from the prior season to this season due to Rick Barry's sudden departure from the team and the ABA. Despite the negative production for this season when compared to the previous season they had, the Nets would be the final team in the Eastern Division to make it to the 1973 ABA Playoffs, making it over the struggling Memphis Tams by six games this season. Once there, the Nets would lose in the first round to the Carolina Cougars, who had the best overall record in the ABA this season, 4–1. Following this season's end, the Nets would obtain a major star player to help reverse their fortunes for the rest of their time in the ABA, as they would finally acquire Julius Erving after previously coveting him back in 1971 in a trade that included George Carter from the Virginia Squires for Willie Sojourner for the apparent purpose of short-term financial gains to help the Squires survive as a franchise.

== ABA Draft ==
Weirdly enough, as of 2025, there has been no official draft records for the first five rounds of the 1972 ABA draft specifically, while every other round after that point has been properly recorded by basketball historians otherwise. Because of the strange dispersity of draft picks not being properly recorded this year after previously being fully recorded in the previous year's draft and the number of rounds potentially being off for even the players being selected this year, the recorded players selected in this year's draft will be marked with a ? for the pick number in particular (as well as certain round numbers, if necessary) in order to showcase the awkward display currently going on with the 1972 ABA draft year in particular (though what is known is that the New York Nets would forfeit what would have been the official #5 pick of the ABA draft this year (or the official #6 pick had the Memphis Pros not lost their own first round pick at #2 due to them signing Larry Cannon from the Denver Rockets sometime after the 1971 ABA draft) due to Nets acquiring Jim Chones, a junior college basketball player that was originally selected by the Virginia Squires before later being considered a rescinded draft pick by the ABA that year due to the ABA preparing for the ABA-NBA merger that was supposed to be done in 1971 before being delayed by 1976, sometime after the 1971 ABA draft ended, as well as utilized a 17th round pick after not using their 15th and 16th round draft picks). However, if any changes come up to where a proper, official recording of the 1972 ABA draft gets released displaying both pick numbers and round numbers for where certain players got selected, please provide the updated (potential) draft ordering with a source confirming the round and pick numbers included here.

Round	Pick	Player	Position(s)	Nationality	College
2(?)	13(?)	Bill Chamberlain	SF	United States	North Carolina
3(?)	19(?)	Brian Taylor	PG	United States	Princeton
3(?)	22(?)	Joby Wright	PF/C	United States	Indiana
4(?)	32(?)	Dwaine Dillard	SF	United States	Eastern Michigan
4(?)	34(?)	Art White	F	United States	Georgetown University
5(?)	38(?)	Bob Lackey	SG	United States	Marquette
6	48(?)	Ron Harris	F	United States	Wichita State
7	59(?)	Hank Siemiontkowski	SF/PF	United States	Villanova
8	70(?)	Walter Jones	F	United States	LIU Brooklyn
9	81(?)	Ed Czernota	F	United States	Sacred Heart
10	92(?)	Randy Noll	F	United States	Marshall
11	103(?)	Quinas Brower	F	United States	Hofstra
12	114(?)	Bill Phillips	C	United States	St. John's
13	125(?)	Kelly Utley	G	United States	Shaw University
14	136(?)	Paul Hoffman	G	United States	St. Bonaventure
17	165(?)	Ron Bradley	G	United States	Eastern Nazarene College

=== ABA Dispersal Draft ===
Months after the original ABA draft for this year concluded, the ABA held their first ever dispersal draft on July 13, 1972 after it was found out by the ABA itself that neither "The Floridians" nor the Pittsburgh Condors would be able to continue operations either in their original locations or elsewhere in the U.S.A. (or even Canada in the case of "The Floridians"). Unlike the main draft they did during the months of March and April, this draft would last for only six rounds as a one day deal and would have the nine remaining inaugural ABA teams selecting players that were left over at the time from both "The Floridians" and Pittsburgh Condors franchises (including draft picks from both teams there) and obtain their player rights from there. Any players from either franchise that wouldn't be selected during this draft would be placed on waivers and enter free agency afterward. Interestingly, only 42 total players were selected by the nine remaining ABA teams at the time of the dispersal draft, meaning everyone else that was available from both teams was considered a free agent to the ABA not long afterward. Not only that, but the Nets would only use two rounds of the dispersal draft on their end, though they would select one player from each team while doing so. With that said, the following players were either Floridians or Condors players that the Nets acquired during this dispersal draft.

Round	Pick	Player	Position	Nationality	College	ABA Team
1	12	Chuck Terry	SF	United States	Long Beach State	Pittsburgh Condors
3	29	George Tinsley	SF	United States	Kentucky Wesleyan	The Floridians

The first selection the Nets made in this draft, Chuck Terry, was not only a draft pick that the Pittsburgh Condors had during the third round of the 1972 ABA draft, but he would also end up joining the Nets years later in both their final season in the ABA and their first season in the NBA after deciding to start his career with the Milwaukee Bucks in the NBA instead, later winning the final ABA championship ever held during his time with the Nets. As for their second and final selection that they made during the third round instead of the second round, George Tinsley would end up retiring from play altogether instead of joining up with the New York Nets after being selected by them after previously playing for "The Floridians" in their final season of play.

== Roster ==
1972–73 New York Nets roster
Players

Pos.	No.	Player	Height	Weight	DOB	From
C	11	Jim Ard	6 ft 8 in (2.03 m)	215 lb (98 kg)	1948-09-19	Cincinnati
SF	20	Johnny Baum	6 ft 5 in (1.96 m)	200 lb (91 kg)	1946-06-17	Temple
PF	43	Art Becker	6 ft 7 in (2.01 m)	205 lb (93 kg)	1942-01-12	Arizona State
PG	3	George Bruns	6 ft 0 in (1.83 m)	160 lb (73 kg)	1946-08-30	Manhattan
SF	40	George Carter	6 ft 4 in (1.93 m)	210 lb (95 kg)	1944-01-10	St. Bonaventure
PF	22	Jim Chones	6 ft 11 in (2.11 m)	220 lb (100 kg)	1949-11-30	Marquette
SG	21	Joe DePre	6 ft 3 in (1.91 m)	185 lb (84 kg)	1947-12-19	St. John's
SF	44	Gary Gregor	6 ft 7 in (2.01 m)	225 lb (102 kg)	1945-08-13	South Carolina
SG	30	Bob Lackey	6 ft 5 in (1.96 m)	200 lb (91 kg)	1949-04-04	Marquette
SG	21	Brian Mahoney	6 ft 3 in (1.91 m)	175 lb (79 kg)	1948-12-17	Manhattan
PG	25	Bill Melchionni	6 ft 1 in (1.85 m)	165 lb (75 kg)	1944-10-19	Villanova
C	5	Billy Paultz	6 ft 11 in (2.11 m)	235 lb (107 kg)	1948-07-30	St. John's
SG	13	John Roche	6 ft 3 in (1.91 m)	170 lb (77 kg)	1949-09-26	South Carolina
PG	14	Brian Taylor	6 ft 2 in (1.88 m)	185 lb (84 kg)	1951-06-09	Princeton
PF	32	Trooper Washington	6 ft 7 in (2.01 m)	215 lb (98 kg)	1944-04-21	Cheyney

Coaches
Head coach
- Lou Carnesecca

Legend
- (DP) Unsigned draft pick
- (FA) Free agent
- (S) Suspended
- Injured

Roster

== Final standings ==
1972–73 ABA Eastern Standings
Eastern Division	W	L	PCT.	GB
Carolina Cougars	57	27	.679	—
Kentucky Colonels	56	28	.667	1
Virginia Squires	42	42	.500	15
New York Nets	30	54	.357	27
Memphis Tams	24	60	.286	33

== ABA Playoffs ==
ABA Eastern Division Semifinals vs. Carolina Cougars

Game	Date	Location	Score	Record	Attendance
1	March 30	Greensboro (Carolina)	96–104	0–1	4,725
2	March 31	Raleigh (Carolina)	114–111	1–1	6,343
3	April 3	New York	91–101	1–2	8,418
4	April 5	New York	108–112	1–3	7,867
5	April 6	Greensboro (Carolina)	113–136	1–4	6,388

Nets lose series, 4–1
