= Larry Brown (basketball) =

American basketball coach and former player

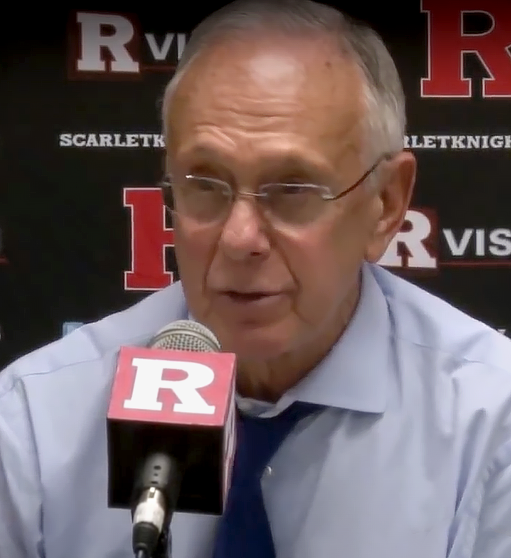
- Brown in 2014

Personal information
- Born: September 14, 1940 (age 86) New York City, New York, U.S.
- Listed height: 5 ft 9 in (1.75 m)
- Listed weight: 165 lb (75 kg)

Career information
- High school: Long Beach (Lido Beach, New York)
- College: North Carolina (1960–1963)
- NBA draft: 1963: 7th round, 55th overall pick
- Drafted by: Baltimore Bullets
- Playing career: 1967–1972
- Position: Point guard
- Number: 11
- Coaching career: 1965–1967, 1972–2022

Career history

Playing
- 1967–1968: New Orleans Buccaneers
- 1968–1971: Oakland Oaks / Washington Caps / Virginia Squires
- 1971–1972: Denver Rockets

Coaching
- 1965–1967: North Carolina (assistant)
- 1972–1974: Carolina Cougars
- 1974–1979: Denver Nuggets
- 1979–1981: UCLA
- 1981–1983: New Jersey Nets
- 1983–1988: Kansas
- 1988–1992: San Antonio Spurs
- 1992–1993: Los Angeles Clippers
- 1993–1997: Indiana Pacers
- 1997–2003: Philadelphia 76ers
- 2003–2005: Detroit Pistons
- 2005–2006: New York Knicks
- 2008–2010: Charlotte Bobcats
- 2012–2016: SMU
- 2018: Auxilium Torino
- 2021: Memphis (assistant)
- 2022: Memphis (advisor to HC)

Career highlights
- As player: ABA champion (1969); 3× ABA All-Star (1968–1970); ABA All-Star MVP (1968); 3× ABA assists leader (1968–1970); All-ABA Second Team (1968); First-team All-ACC (1963); Second-team All-ACC (1962); As coach: NBA champion (2004); NCAA Division I tournament champion (1988); 3× NCAA Division I tournament Final Four (1980*, 1986, 1988); 2× Big Eight tournament champion (1984, 1986); Big Eight regular season champion (1986); AAC tournament champion (2015); AAC regular season champion (2015); Chuck Daly Lifetime Achievement Award (2021); NBA Coach of the Year (2001); 3× ABA All-Star Game head coach (1973, 1975, 1976); 2× NBA All-Star Game head coach (1977, 2001); 3× ABA Coach of the Year (1973, 1975, 1976); Top 15 Coaches in NBA History; Naismith College Coach of the Year (1988); * Vacated by the NCAA

Career ABA playing statistics
- Points: 4,229 (11.2 ppg)
- Rebounds: 1,005 (2.7 rpg)
- Assists: 2,509 (6.7 apg)
- Stats at Basketball Reference

Career coaching record
- ABA & NBA: 1327–1011 (.568)
- Record at Basketball Reference
- Basketball Hall of Fame
- Collegiate Basketball Hall of Fame
Medals
Men's basketball
Representing the United States
Olympic Games
| Gold medal – first place | 1964 Tokyo | Men's basketball |
Head coach for the United States
| Bronze medal – third place | 2004 Athens | Men's basketball |
Assistant coach for the United States
| Gold medal – first place | 2000 Sydney | Men's basketball |
FIBA Americas Championship
Head coach for the United States
| Gold medal – first place | 2003 San Juan | Men's basketball |
Maccabiah Games
Representing the United States
| Gold medal – first place | 1961 Israel | Men's basketball |

Lawrence Harvey Brown (born September 14, 1940) is an American basketball coach and former player who last served as an assistant coach for the Memphis Tigers. Brown is the only coach in basketball history to win both an NCAA national championship (Kansas Jayhawks, 1988) and an NBA title (Detroit Pistons, 2004). He has a 1,275–965 lifetime professional coaching record in the American Basketball Association (ABA) and the National Basketball Association (NBA) and is the only coach in NBA history to lead eight teams (differing franchises) to the playoffs. He also won an ABA championship as a player with the Oakland Oaks in the 1968–69 season, and an Olympic gold medal in 1964. He is also the only person ever to coach two NBA franchises in the same season (Spurs and Clippers during the 1991–92 NBA season). Before coaching, Brown played collegiately at the University of North Carolina and professionally in the ABA.

Brown was enshrined in the Basketball Hall of Fame as a coach on September 27, 2002. On July 8, 2021, the National Basketball Coaches Association awarded Brown the Chuck Daly Lifetime Achievement Award.

== Early life and early basketball accomplishments ==
Brown was born on September 14, 1940, in Brooklyn, New York, to a Jewish family. His maternal grandfather, Hittelman, was from Minsk, Belarus. His mother's family immigrated to the United States in 1910 and opened a bakery in Brooklyn.Brown's mother met his father, Milton Brown, a furniture salesman, when she was 26 years old. Brown has an older brother, Herbert, who was also an NBA head coach. In 1947, Brown's father died suddenly of a ruptured aneurysm. His family later moved to Long Beach, New York, on Long Island. Brown's mother lived until the age of 106.

A 5 ft 9 in (1.75 m) point guard, Brown attended Long Beach High School. He won a gold medal with Team USA in basketball at the 1961 Maccabiah Games in Israel, on a team that included Art Heyman and Charley Rosen.

Brown attended University of North Carolina, where he played basketball under legendary coaches Frank McGuire and Dean Smith. Brown was an All-Atlantic Coast Conference player in 1963.

== Playing career ==
A stellar player for the Tar Heels in the early 1960s, Brown was considered too small to play in the NBA. He began his post-college career with the National Alliance of Basketball Leagues's Akron Goodyear Wingfoots, where he played for two years (1964–65). He led the Wingfoots to the 1964 AAU National Championship. Brown was selected for Team USA's 1964 Summer Olympics team, which won the gold medal.

After a two-year stint (1965–1967) as an assistant coach at North Carolina, Brown joined the upstart American Basketball Association, playing with the New Orleans Buccaneers (1967–68), Oakland Oaks (1968–69), Washington Caps (1969–70), Virginia Squires (1970–71), and Denver Rockets (1971–72). Brown was named MVP of the ABA's first All-Star Game in 1968, and was named to the All-ABA Second Team the same year. Brown led the ABA in assists per game during the league's first three seasons, and when he ended his playing career, Brown was the ABA's all-time assist leader. His total of 2,509 assists places him seventh on the ABA's career list, and he holds the ABA record for assists in a game with 23. He was a three-time ABA All-Star.

== Coaching and management career ==
=== Early years: 1969–1983 ===
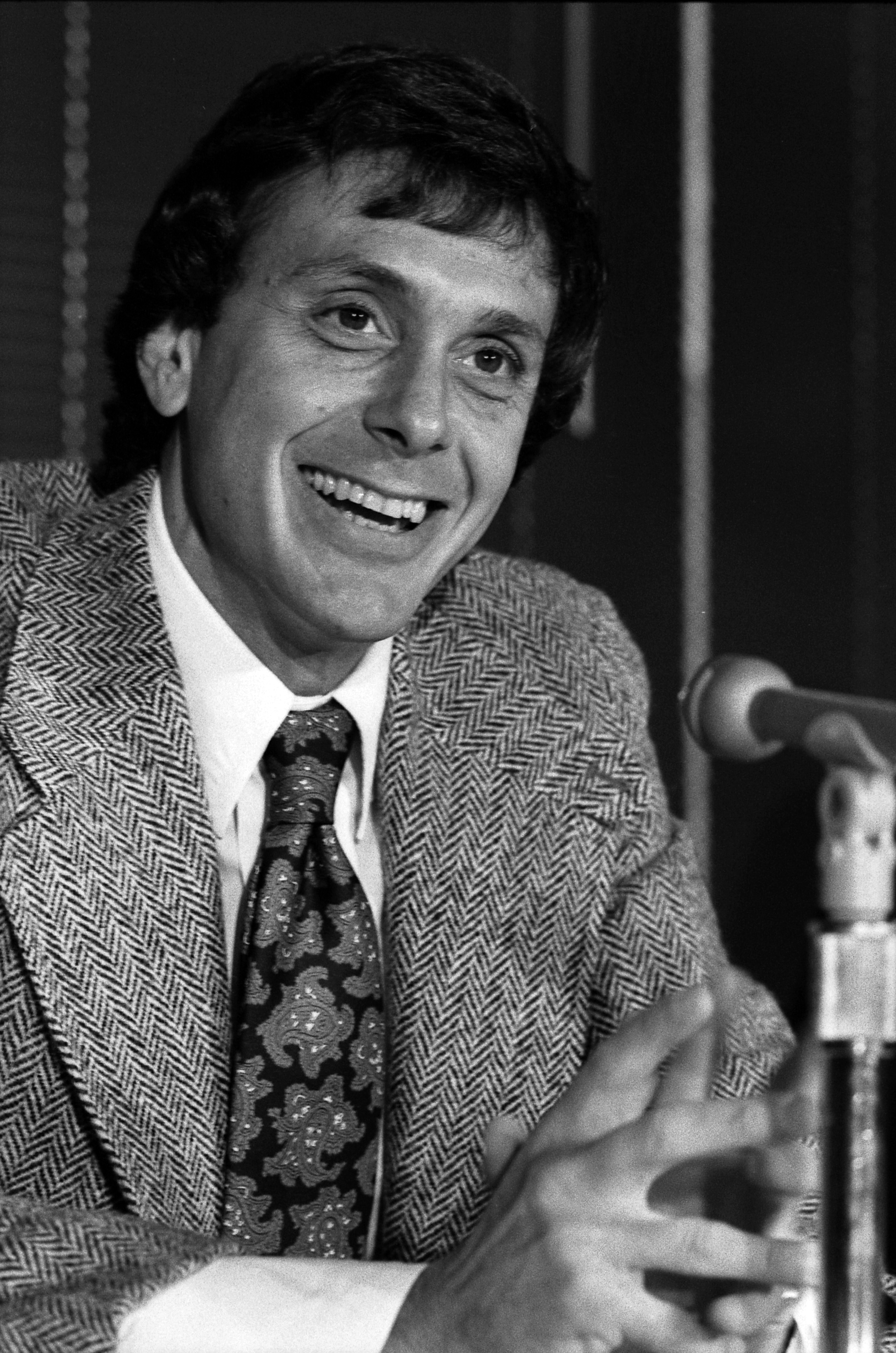
Brown in 1979

Brown's first head coaching job was at Davidson College in North Carolina in 1969. He resigned after less than two months, having never fielded a team or coached a game. He did not discuss the reasons for his resignation, saying only that "it was in the best interests of Davidson and myself". He has later stated that it was a matter of the program reneging on promises made.

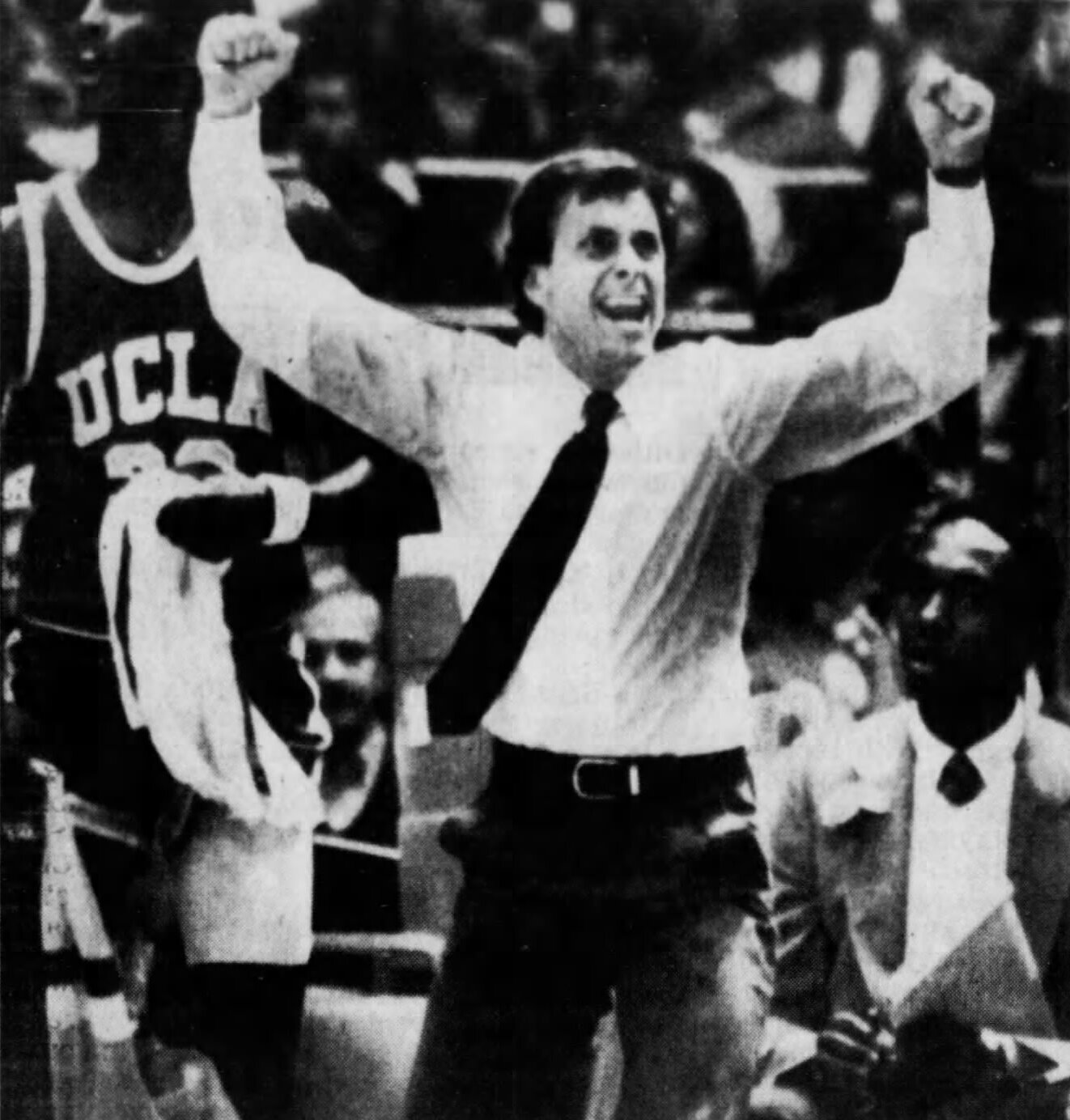
Brown coaching UCLA circa 1981

In the summer of 1972, with a sore hip that was plaguing his play with Denver (he later had it replaced), Brown was offered to coach the Carolina Cougars by team owner Tedd Munchak. Despite favoring college coaching over the pros, he elected to take the "great opportunity" and coach for $30,000. He then hired his friend and ex-teammate Doug Moe as an assistant coach. Using a "run-and-jump defense" that emphasized quickness and bench depth that could share minutes (at one point, Brown had four guards he had play equal time), the Cougars won 57 games in his first year; Billy Cunningham, who lept from the NBA, won league MVP that year. The passing-game offense emphasized moving the ball quickly rather than isolation. After the second season, Brown left the team.

Brown left to coach the Denver Nuggets in 1974. He soon built a rapport with the team, and in their first season, they scored 118.7 points per game and won the Western Division for the first time in five years with a 65–19 record. They made it to the Division Finals but lost in a seven-game series to the Indiana Pacers. The Nuggets, now packed in a league that went from nine teams to just seven by its end, won the most games with a record of 60–24. They defeated the Kentucky Colonels in a tight seven-game series reach their first and only ABA Finals. The Nuggets lost three of the first four games before winning Game 5 and leading in the third quarter of Game 6 before the Nets rallied back to win the game and the series. As it turned out, it was the final game of the American Basketball Association and the last time the Nuggets reached a league final until 2023. Despite the high fee to join the NBA and a new placement in the Midwest Division, the Nuggets went 50–32 and won the division title before losing to the eventual NBA champion Portland Trail Blazers in the First Round in six games. In the next season, they won 48 games for another division title and managed to win their first playoff series to get to the Conference Finals against the Seattle SuperSonics, where the Nuggets were beaten by the Sonics in six games. In the middle of the 1978–79 season, Brown clashed with general manager Carl Scheer over the latter's refusal to trade Dan Issel and elected on February 2, 1979, to resign under apparent strain of a near emotional collapse.

He then moved on to coach for UCLA (1979–1981), leading his freshman-dominated 1979–80 team to the NCAA title game before falling to Louisville, 59–54. However, that appearance was later vacated by the NCAA after two UCLA players were found to be ineligible—one of the few times a Final Four squad has had its record vacated. On March 17, 1981, Brown left UCLA to become head coach of the New Jersey Nets, which reportedly offered him a salary of over $170,000 a year that dwarfed what he made at UCLA. The team won 44 games in his first season and in their second season they were 47–29 before he was approached about the possibility of taking the job at the University of Kansas, who fired their coach after the end of the 1982–83 season. On April 6, 1983, with an offer to coach Kansas and advised by Nets owner Joe Taub that it would be best to leave now rather than at the end of the season, Brown resigned from the Nets and became coach at Kansas.

=== University of Kansas: 1983–1988 ===
Brown began his tenure at the University of Kansas (1983–1988), replacing the fired Ted Owens, who had overseen back-to-back losing seasons in 1981–82 and 1982–83. Brown's impact was felt almost immediately, as the 1983–84 Jayhawks put together a 22–10 record, finished in second place in that year's Big 8 standings, upset Oklahoma to win the 1984 Big 8 Tournament, and advanced to the 1984 NCAA Tournament's Round of 32 before losing to Wake Forest. In the meantime Brown signed the most coveted high school player in the country, Danny Manning, to play for KU after signing his father, Ed Manning, to a position as an assistant coach.

Perhaps Brown's finest team at Kansas was the 1985–86 team. This squad put together a 35–4 record, the first 30-win season in KU history. They won the Big 8 regular season title for the first time since 1978, defeated Iowa State to win the 1986 Big 8 Tournament, and advanced to the 1986 Final Four before losing to Duke in the semifinals.

In the 1987–88 season, Kansas got off to a mediocre 12–8 start, including 1–4 in the Big 8, and the end of the Jayhawks' 55-game homecourt winning streak in Allen Fieldhouse. Ultimately, behind the high-scoring of Danny Manning, KU rallied to win nine of their next twelve games to finish third place in the Big 8 and qualify for the 1988 NCAA tournament as a 6-seed in the Midwest Regional. Kansas then proceeded to defeat 11th-seed Xavier, 14th-seed Murray State, and 7th-seed Vanderbilt before meeting rival Kansas State, which had beaten KU twice in three meetings that year. KU upset the 4th-seeded Wildcats 71–58 in the Elite Eight to reach the Final Four in Kansas City's Kemper Arena. Once there, Kansas upset the East Region's #2 seed Duke, 66–59, avenging an overtime loss at home to the Blue Devils earlier in the season. Two nights later, the Jayhawks, who became known as "Danny and the Miracles", upset the Southeast Region's #1-seed and fellow Big 8 rival Oklahoma, 83–79, to avenge a regular-season sweep by the Sooners and win the 1988 NCAA championship. Manning, who scored 31 points and grabbed 18 rebounds in the final, was named Most Outstanding Player of the Tournament. Kansas concluded the year 27–11; the 11 losses remain a record for most losses by an NCAA champion to this day.

Two months later, Brown opted to return to professional coaching, departing KU for the San Antonio Spurs. In his five seasons at Kansas, Brown had one Big 8 regular season title, two Big 8 postseason titles, five NCAA Tournament appearances, three Sweet 16 appearances, two trips to the Final Four, and one national title. As a collegiate coach, he had a cumulative coaching record of 177–61 (.744) in seven seasons, including a 135–44 (.754) record at Kansas. His efforts led to him being named "Coach of the Year" for the NCAA in 1988 and "Coach of the Year" for the Big Eight Conference in 1986.

After Brown left Kansas to return to the NBA, NCAA sanctions were levied against Kansas in the 1988–89 season as a result of multiple recruiting violations; potential transfer Vincent Askew was provided with money to leave his campus to visit his ill grandmother, and the "casual administration of a summer jobs program" that was linked to other "violations of NCAA regulations." No players on any of Brown's teams were named in the report, and Askew did not transfer to Kansas. The Jayhawks were given three years' probation and banned from the 1989 NCAA Tournament–to date, the only time a defending champion has been barred from defending its title. They were also docked one scholarship for the 1989–90 season, and barred from paid visits during the 1989 calendar year. As harsh as these sanctions were, the infractions committee seriously considered imposing a "death penalty" on Kansas, which would have resulted in canceling the entire 1988–89 season. Indeed, enforcement director David Berst said that Kansas was "on the bubble" for a death penalty. However, the committee opted against imposing a death penalty because Askew was the only player who received impermissible benefits, and because Brown had returned to the NBA by then.

=== San Antonio Spurs: 1988–1992 ===
Brown was hired to coach the San Antonio Spurs in 1988, signing a five-year, $3.5 million contract. With Brown at the helm, the Spurs won two consecutive Midwest Division titles. In his second season, the Spurs, led by David Robinson–who finally joined the Spurs after serving his two-year naval commitment–vaulted from the worst record in franchise history to the best. Brown remained with the Spurs until he was fired on January 21, 1992. He described his tenure later as a rocky one in his press conference for his next coaching position, saying "In San Antonio, we won 21 games my first year, and that never satisfied our owner (referring to Red McCombs). From Day 1, I felt he felt he made a terrible mistake in hiring me, and no matter what we did after that I always felt that was the case...I have a commitment from the Clippers. I think they made a statement, and I think that statement will be made to the players. I don't know if our players in San Antonio ever felt that I was in control of the basketball end."

=== Los Angeles Clippers: 1992–1993 ===
On February 7, 1992, Brown was hired to coach the Los Angeles Clippers. He took a sub-.500 team in 1992 and guided them to their first winning season since the franchise moved to Los Angeles and their first playoff berth since they were the Buffalo Braves in 1976. He followed that up the next season with another playoff appearance in 1993. Brown resigned his position on May 21, 1993. The Clippers claimed to be surprised by the move, as he left with two years remaining on a contract that paid him $750,000 a year while on vacation in May. Brown claimed he resigned in February, which they accepted, although he stated that they tried to later offer him a contract for life (with a request from owner Donald Sterling himself) that they did not follow up on. He was the first fulltime Clippers coach to finish with a winning record in his tenure and the only one until Vinny Del Negro twenty years later.

=== Indiana Pacers: 1993–1997 ===
Brown was hired by the Indiana Pacers in June 1993. Prior to Brown being their coach, the Pacers had never won a postseason series since joining the NBA. He proceeded to lead them to the conference finals on two occasions. On December 13, 1996, he won his 594th game as an NBA coach with a 97–94 victory over the Boston Celtics. Combined with his wins in the NCAA and the ABA, it was his 1,000th combined win as a head coach. He resigned his position on April 30, 1997, citing his frustration with the team's inability to advance past the conference finals, which he felt was his responsibility. In four seasons, he had gone 190–138.

=== Philadelphia 76ers: 1997–2003 ===
Brown was hired as head coach of the Philadelphia 76ers in 1997. The 76ers had lost 60 games prior to Brown's arrival, but they were brightened by the emergence of Allen Iverson, who won Rookie of the Year. The 1997–98 season was the only one under Brown that the 76ers did not reach the postseason, as they went 31–51. In the strike-shortened 1998–99 season, they finished 6th in the Eastern Conference to reach the postseason for the first time since 1991. They advanced to the Semifinals after a first-round win, but they lost to the Indiana Pacers in a four-game sweep. The following year was essentially a repeat as they lost again to the Pacers in the Semifinals. The 2000–01 season, however, would be different. Bolstered by the efforts of Iverson, who led the league in scoring with 31.1 points per game and the defensive dominance of Dikembe Mutombo, the team rocketed their way to 56 wins, the first 50-win season since the 1989–90 team. They dispatched the Pacers in four games but had to deal with tough opponents in the Toronto Raptors and the Milwaukee Bucks in the Semifinals and Conference finals, respectively. Philadelphia won each of those series in seven games. They faced the defending champion Los Angeles Lakers in the 2001 NBA Finals, who had not lost any of their postseason games that year. The Sixers gave them trouble in Game 1 of the series, which saw them pull off an overtime win 107–101 with Iverson scoring 48 points. As it turned out, it would be the only highlight of the Finals for the Sixers, who lost the next four games to lose the series. After the season, Brown was named Coach of the Year.

The following year saw the team plagued by injury while making the playoffs as a 6 seed. They lost to the Boston Celtics in five games. The next year, they went 48-34 and made it in as a 4 seed. They beat the New Orleans Hornets in the first round before the Detroit Pistons ended their season with a six-game victory. Brown resigned his post in 2003. Brown also served as Director of Basketball Operations in Philadelphia.

In 2005, Allen Iverson, who frequently clashed with Brown when he played for him in Philadelphia, said that he was without a doubt "the best coach in the world".

=== Detroit Pistons and U.S. National Team: 2003–2005 ===
Brown was hired to replace Rick Carlisle to coach the Detroit Pistons. Brown won his first (and ultimately only) NBA championship during his first year with the Detroit Pistons in 2004, defeating the Los Angeles Lakers four games to one in the 2004 NBA Finals. By doing so, Brown became the first, and so far only, coach to lead teams to both NCAA and NBA titles. Brown is also the only NBA coach to take two teams (76ers and Pistons) to the NBA Finals against the same opponent (Los Angeles Lakers in 2001 and 2004), lose the first time, and win the second.

Brown was chosen as the head coach for the United States men's basketball team at the 2004 Summer Olympics. That team won the bronze medal at the Olympics; it was the first U.S. men's basketball team to fail to win gold at a Summer Olympics since NBA players began playing on the U.S. men's team in 1992.

In May 2005, rumors surfaced that Brown would become the Cleveland Cavaliers' team president as soon as the Detroit Pistons finished their postseason. At any rate, the Pistons played the San Antonio Spurs to seven games in the 2005 NBA Finals. The Pistons were up two points with 9.4 seconds to play in game 5 and had to defend an inbound play. Rasheed Wallace was assigned to guard Robert Horry. On the play, Wallace trapped Manu Ginobili, who passed it away to Horry, who found time to shoot the game-winning three for the Spurs. Chauncey Billups (the Finals MVP from the previous year), who was not in the game for the final play, stated later that Brown "just kind of choked" in that game.

On July 19, 2005, the Pistons, displeased with Brown's public flirtations with other teams—bought out the remaining years of Brown's contract, allowing him to sign with another team. A week later, on July 28, 2005, Brown became the head coach of the New York Knicks, with a 5-year contract reportedly worth between US$50 million and $60 million, making him the highest-paid coach in NBA history.

=== New York Knicks: 2005–2006 ===
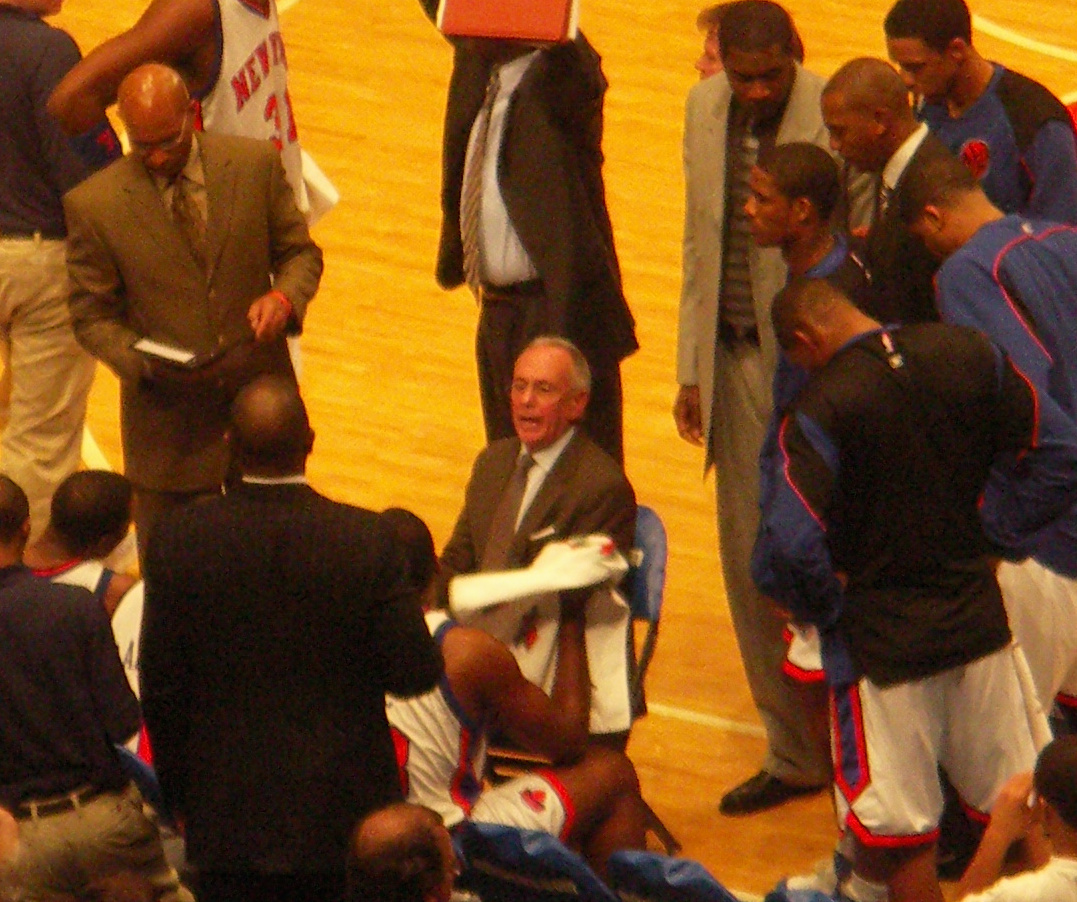
Brown (center) coaching the New York Knicks in 2005

On January 13, 2006, the Knicks beat the Atlanta Hawks to give Brown his 1,000th win in the NBA, making him only the fourth coach to do so (at the time, the other three were Lenny Wilkens, Don Nelson, and Pat Riley; coincidentally, all three had previously served as coach of the Knicks at some point in their careers.

Brown's tenure as Knicks head coach lasted one season. The Knicks fired him on June 23, 2006, after he led the team to a 23–59 record. Brown's season with the Knicks was marred by public feuds with his own players, most notably point guard Stephon Marbury. After the firing, the Knicks declined to pay the remaining sum (more than $40 million) under Brown's contract on the grounds that he had been terminated for cause. Before the contract dispute was to be heard by NBA Commissioner David Stern, Brown reached an agreement with the Knicks wherein the team agreed to pay him $18.5 million.

=== Philadelphia 76ers front office: 2007–2008 ===
In January 2007, Brown became Executive Vice President of the Philadelphia 76ers. Brown resigned in April 2008.

=== Charlotte Bobcats: 2008–2010 ===
On April 29, 2008, Brown signed to become the head coach of the Charlotte Bobcats – his ninth NBA coaching job. He managed to keep the relatively young team in playoff contention. The following season, Brown guided the Bobcats to the franchise's first ever playoff appearance. Charlotte was the eighth team he had led to the postseason, an NBA record.

On December 22, 2010, Brown parted ways with the Bobcats after the team started the 2010–2011 season with a record of 9–19. His departure was officially characterized as a resignation, but other sources reported that Brown was fired. Assistant coach Jeff Capel II told The Charlotte Observer that the entire coaching staff had been fired.

He returned to Lawrence, Kansas to coach in an exhibition match on September 24, 2011, for the "Legends of the Phog" event, opposite Ted Owens, in which various Kansas Jayhawks Basketball alumni played an exhibition game during the 2011 NBA lockout.

=== Southern Methodist University: 2012–2016 ===
On April 17, 2012, ESPN reported that Brown was to be named the new head coach of the SMU Mustangs, replacing Matt Doherty, who had been fired from SMU earlier in March. Tim Jankovich, the head coach of Illinois State, was hired as the coach-in-waiting.

After a rebuilding season in 2012–2013 (15–17), Brown brought SMU into the national conversation the following year, as the school made its first appearance in The Associated Press Top 25 rankings since 1985. SMU went on to be the overall number one seed in the National Invitational Tournament, losing in the final game of the tournament to Minnesota, and finished the year with a record of 27–10. In the 2014–2015 season, SMU won the American Athletic Conference tournament and secured its first NCAA Tournament appearance since 1993.

On September 29, 2015, Brown was suspended by the NCAA for 30% of the Mustangs' games in the upcoming 2015–2016 season, and the team was banned from 2016 post-season play, placed on probation for three years, and lost nine scholarships over a three-year period. The NCAA found that Brown failed to report violations when a former administrative assistant committed academic fraud on behalf of a student-athlete and he initially lied to enforcement staff about his knowledge of the potential violations.

On July 8, 2016, Brown announced his resignation as head basketball coach.

=== Auxilium Torino: 2018 ===
On June 12, 2018, Brown accepted the proposal of Auxilium Torino to become the new head coach of the Italian basketball club of the Lega Basket Serie A (LBA). On June 17, he officially became new head coach of Torino. He was fired midseason on December 27 with the team's record at just 5–19.

=== University of Memphis: 2021–2022 ===
In June 2021, Brown joined the coaching staff of the Memphis Tigers men's basketball program, as an assistant coach under head coach and former NBA player Penny Hardaway. Brown had most recently served as an assistant coach in 1967. After the 2021–22 season, Brown transitioned to an advisory role for Memphis before stepping down mid-season due to health concerns.

== Career playing statistics ==
Legend
| GP | Games played | GS | Games started | MPG | Minutes per game |
| FG% | Field goal percentage | 3P% | 3-point field goal percentage | FT% | Free throw percentage |
| RPG | Rebounds per game | APG | Assists per game | SPG | Steals per game |
| BPG | Blocks per game | PPG | Points per game | **Bold** | Career high |
| * | Led the league |

| † | Denotes seasons in which Brown's team won an ABA championship |
| * | ABA record |

=== ABA ===
==== Regular season ====
| Year | Team | GP | MPG | FG% | 3P% | FT% | RPG | APG | PPG |
|---|---|---|---|---|---|---|---|---|---|
| 1967–68 | New Orleans | 78 | **36.0** | .366 | .213 | .813 | **3.2** | 6.5* | 13.4 |
| 1968–69† | Oakland | 77 | 30.9 | .436 | .229 | .794 | 3.1 | 7.1* | 12.0 |
| 1969–70 | Washington | **82** | 33.7 | **.440** | .256 | .825 | 3.0 | 7.1* | **13.7** |
| 1970–71 | Virginia | 29 | 18.3 | .404 | **.500** | **.831** | 1.6 | 4.2 | 5.5 |
| 1970–71 | Denver | 34 | 23.9 | .360 | .263 | .824 | 1.8 | 6.1 | 8.4 |
| 1971–72 | Denver | 76 | 26.5 | .437 | .200 | .811 | 2.2 | **7.2** | 9.1 |
| Career | | 376 | 30.1 | .412 | .230 | .813 | 2.7 | 6.7* | 11.2 |
| All-Star | | 3 | 20.7 | .444 | .667 | .778 | 2.0 | 5.0 | 8.3 |

==== Playoffs ====
| Year | Team | GP | MPG | FG% | 3P% | FT% | RPG | APG | PPG |
|---|---|---|---|---|---|---|---|---|---|
| 1968 | New Orleans | **17** | **40.9** | .425 | **.222** | .820 | 3.5 | 7.6 | **16.7** |
| 1969† | Oakland | 16 | 33.4 | .428 | .000 | .844 | 3.3 | 5.4 | 14.0 |
| 1970 | Washington | 7 | 38.4 | **.452** | .200 | .882 | **5.0** | **9.7** | 13.9 |
| 1972 | Denver | 7 | 30.1 | .420 | .000 | **.958** | 1.4 | 5.1 | 9.3 |
| Career | | 47 | 36.4 | .429 | .172 | .848 | 3.3 | 6.8* | 14.3 |

== Head coaching record ==
=== ABA and NBA ===
Legend
| Regular season | G | Games coached | W | Games won | L | Games lost | W–L % | Win–loss % |
| Playoffs | PG | Playoff games | PW | Playoff wins | PL | Playoff losses | PW–L % | Playoff win–loss % |

| Team | Year | G | W | L | W–L% | Finish | PG | PW | PL | PW–L% | Result |
|---|---|---|---|---|---|---|---|---|---|---|---|
| Carolina (Note: Indicates season in the American Basketball Association (ABA).) | 1972–73 | 84 | 57 | 27 | .679 | 1st in East | 12 | 7 | 5 | .583 | Lost in Division finals |
| Carolina | 1973–74 | 84 | 47 | 37 | .560 | 3rd in East | 4 | 0 | 4 | .000 | Lost in Division semifinals |
| Denver | 1974–75 | 84 | 65 | 19 | .774 | 1st in West | 13 | 7 | 6 | .538 | Lost in Division finals |
| Denver | 1975–76 | 84 | 60 | 24 | .714 | 1st in West | 13 | 6 | 7 | .462 | Lost in ABA Finals |
| Denver | 1976–77 | 82 | 50 | 32 | .610 | 1st in Midwest | 6 | 2 | 4 | .333 | Lost in Conf. Semifinals |
| Denver | 1977–78 | 82 | 48 | 34 | .585 | 1st in Midwest | 13 | 6 | 7 | .462 | Lost in Conf. Finals |
| Denver | 1978–79 | 53 | 28 | 25 | .528 | — | — | — | — | — | — |
| New Jersey | 1981–82 | 82 | 44 | 38 | .537 | 3rd in Atlantic | 2 | 0 | 2 | .000 | Lost in first round |
| New Jersey | 1982–83 | 76 | 47 | 29 | .618 | — | — | — | — | — | — |
| San Antonio | 1988–89 | 82 | 21 | 61 | .256 | 5th in Midwest | — | — | — | — | Missed Playoffs |
| San Antonio | 1989–90 | 82 | 56 | 26 | .683 | 1st in Midwest | 10 | 6 | 4 | .600 | Lost in Conf. Semifinals |
| San Antonio | 1990–91 | 82 | 55 | 27 | .671 | 1st in Midwest | 4 | 1 | 3 | .250 | Lost in first round |
| San Antonio | 1991–92 | 38 | 21 | 17 | .553 | — | — | — | — | — | — |
| L.A. Clippers | 1991–92 | 35 | 23 | 12 | .657 | 5th in Pacific | 5 | 2 | 3 | .400 | Lost in first round |
| L.A. Clippers | 1992–93 | 82 | 41 | 41 | .500 | 5th in Pacific | 5 | 2 | 3 | .400 | Lost in first round |
| Indiana | 1993–94 | 82 | 47 | 35 | .573 | 4th in Central | 16 | 10 | 6 | .625 | Lost in Conf. Finals |
| Indiana | 1994–95 | 82 | 52 | 30 | .634 | 1st in Central | 17 | 10 | 7 | .588 | Lost in Conf. Finals |
| Indiana | 1995–96 | 82 | 52 | 30 | .634 | 2nd in Central | 5 | 2 | 3 | .400 | Lost in first round |
| Indiana | 1996–97 | 82 | 39 | 43 | .476 | 6th in Central | — | — | — | — | Missed Playoffs |
| Philadelphia | 1997–98 | 82 | 31 | 51 | .378 | 7th in Atlantic | — | — | — | — | Missed Playoffs |
| Philadelphia | 1998–99 | 50 | 28 | 22 | .560 | 3rd in Atlantic | 8 | 3 | 5 | .375 | Lost in Conf. Semifinals |
| Philadelphia | 1999–00 | 82 | 49 | 33 | .598 | 3rd in Atlantic | 10 | 5 | 5 | .500 | Lost in Conf. Semifinals |
| Philadelphia | 2000–01 | 82 | 56 | 26 | .683 | 1st in Atlantic | 23 | 12 | 11 | .522 | Lost in NBA Finals |
| Philadelphia | 2001–02 | 82 | 43 | 39 | .524 | 4th in Atlantic | 5 | 2 | 3 | .400 | Lost in first round |
| Philadelphia | 2002–03 | 82 | 48 | 34 | .585 | 2nd in Atlantic | 12 | 6 | 6 | .500 | Lost in Conf. Semifinals |
| Detroit | 2003–04 | 82 | 54 | 28 | .659 | 2nd in Central | 23 | 16 | 7 | .696 | Won NBA Championship |
| Detroit | 2004–05 | 82 | 54 | 28 | .659 | 1st in Central | 25 | 15 | 10 | .600 | Lost in NBA Finals |
| New York | 2005–06 | 82 | 23 | 59 | .280 | 5th in Atlantic | — | — | — | — | Missed Playoffs |
| Charlotte | 2008–09 | 82 | 35 | 47 | .427 | 4th in Southeast | — | — | — | — | Missed Playoffs |
| Charlotte | 2009–10 | 82 | 44 | 38 | .537 | 3rd in Southeast | 4 | 0 | 4 | .000 | Lost in first round |
| Charlotte | 2010–11 | 28 | 9 | 19 | .321 | — | — | — | — | — | — |
| ABA Career | | 336 | 229 | 107 | .682 | | 42 | 20 | 22 | .476 | |
| NBA Career | | 2,002 | 1,098 | 904 | .548 | | 193 | 100 | 93 | .518 | |
| Career Total | | 2,338 | 1,327 | 1,011 | .568 | | 235 | 120 | 115 | .511 | |

=== College ===
Record table
| Season | Team | Overall | Conference | Standing | Postseason |
|---|---|---|---|---|---|
UCLA Bruins (Pacific-10 Conference) (1979–1981)
| 1979–80 | UCLA | 22–10 (17–9) | 12–6 | 4th | NCAA Division I Runner-up (vacated)* |
| 1980–81 | UCLA | 20–7 | 13–5 | 3rd | NCAA Division I second round |
| UCLA: | | 37–16 (.698) | 25–11 (.694) | | |
Kansas Jayhawks (Big Eight Conference) (1983–1988)
| 1983–84 | Kansas | 22–10 | 9–5 | 2nd | NCAA Division I second round |
| 1984–85 | Kansas | 26–8 | 11–3 | 2nd | NCAA Division I second round |
| 1985–86 | Kansas | 35–4 | 13–1 | 1st | NCAA Division I Final Four |
| 1986–87 | Kansas | 25–11 | 9–5 | T–2nd | NCAA Division I Sweet 16 |
| 1987–88 | Kansas | 27–11 | 9–5 | 3rd | NCAA Division I Champions |
| Kansas: | | 135–44 (.754) | 51–19 (.729) | | |
SMU Mustangs (Conference USA) (2012–2013)
| 2012–13 | SMU | 15–17 | 5–11 | 11th | |
SMU Mustangs (American Athletic Conference) (2013–2016)
| 2013–14 | SMU | 27–10 | 12–6 | T–3rd | NIT Runner-up |
| 2014–15 | SMU | 27–7 | 15–3 | 1st | NCAA Division I First Round |
| 2015–16 | SMU | 25–5 | 13–5 | 2nd | Ineligible |
| SMU: | | 94–39 (.707) | 45–24 (.652) | | |
| Total: | | 266–99 (.731) | | | |
National champion Postseason invitational champion Conference regular season champion Conference regular season and conference tournament champion Division regular season champion Division regular season and conference tournament champion Conference tournament champion

=== National team ===
Statistics
| Team | Year | G | W | L | W–L% | Tournament | TG | TW | TL | TW–L% | Result |
|---|---|---|---|---|---|---|---|---|---|---|---|
| United States | 2004 | 18 | 15 | 3 | .833 | Olympics | 8 | 5 | 3 | .625 | Won bronze medal |
| Career | | 18 | 15 | 3 | .833 | | 8 | 5 | 3 | .625 | |

== Achievements ==
NBA

- 2004 NBA Champion as head coach of Detroit Pistons
- 2001 NBA Coach of the Year with Philadelphia 76ers
- Named one of the top 15 greatest coaches in NBA history

ABA

- Three-time ABA All-Star
- Three-time ABA Coach of the Year

College basketball

- Led UCLA to 1980 Final Four
- Led Kansas to 1988 NCAA National Championship

USA basketball

- Won gold medal as player on 1964 USA Olympic Basketball team
- Won gold medal as assistant coach on the 2000 USA Olympic Basketball team
- Won bronze medal as head coach of 2004 USA Olympic Basketball team

Halls of Fame

- Naismith Basketball Hall of Fame inductee
- College Basketball Hall of Fame inductee
- Colorado Sports Hall of Fame inductee
- International Jewish Sports Hall of Fame inductee
- Philadelphia Jewish Sports Hall of Fame inductee

== See also ==
- List of NCAA Division I men's basketball tournament Final Four appearances by coach
- List of select Jewish basketball players
- List of All-Atlantic Coast Conference men's basketball teams

Sporting positions
| Preceded by Tom Meschery | Carolina Cougars head coach 1972–1974 | Succeeded by Bob MacKinnon |
