= 1968–69 Oakland Oaks season =

- ABA champions
- Division champions
- Head coach: Alex Hannum
- General manager: Scotty Stirling
- Owner(s): Pat Boone; S. Kenneth Davidson; Dennis A. Murphy
- Arena: Oakland–Alameda County Coliseum Arena

Results
- Record: 60–18 (.769)
- Place: Division: 1st (Western)
- Playoff finish: Won ABA Championship

Local media
- Television: KEMO 20

The 1968–69 Oakland Oaks season was the second and final season of the Oaks existing under that name in the ABA. The Oaks finished the season first in the Western Division and won their first and only ABA title in the process. They were helped in part by the hiring of Alex Hannum and Rick Barry for $85,000 per year alongside drafting rookie Warren Jabali in the 1968 ABA draft.

In the ABA Western Division Semifinals, they defeated the Denver Rockets in a tough seven game series on their end. In the ABA Western Division Finals, they swept the previous Western Division Champions, the New Orleans Buccaneers, in four games. Finally, they would beat the Eastern Division Champions, the Indiana Pacers, in five games to secure the championship that season.

Despite their success for the season, however, the team still operated at a loss. Despite being owned by singer Pat Boone alongside S. Kenneth Davidson and Dennis A. Murphy, the team lost money due to the proximity of the San Francisco Warriors. Not only that, but a blank check after winning the ABA Championship that season had the team risk being foreclosed upon via bankruptcy before new ownership stepped in by the eleventh hour to help save the franchise. As such, despite winning the title, the team moved to Washington, D.C. to become the Washington Caps. That team's existence would only last for one season before they moved the Caps to the nearby state of Virginia to become a regional franchise known as the Virginia Squires for the rest of their tenure going forward from there.

== Roster ==
1968–69 Oakland Oaks roster
Players

Pos.	No.	Player	Height	Weight	DOB	From
G	44	Andrew Anderson	6 ft 2 in (1.88 m)	184 lb (83 kg)	July 6, 1945	Canisius
SF	24	Rick Barry	6 ft 7 in (2.01 m)	205 lb (93 kg)	March 28, 1944	Miami (FL)
PF	30	Gary Bradds	6 ft 8 in (2.03 m)	210 lb (95 kg)	July 26, 1942	Ohio State
PG	11	Larry Brown	5 ft 9 in (1.75 m)	160 lb (73 kg)	September 14, 1940	North Carolina
SF	32	John Clawson	6 ft 4 in (1.93 m)	200 lb (91 kg)	May 15, 1944	Michigan
PG	14	Russ Critchfield	5 ft 10 in (1.78 m)	150 lb (68 kg)	June 27, 1946	California
C	42	Jim Eakins	6 ft 11 in (2.11 m)	215 lb (98 kg)	May 24, 1946	BYU
C	33	Ira Harge	6 ft 9 in (2.06 m)	225 lb (102 kg)	March 14, 1941	New Mexico
SG	15, 31	Warren Jabali	6 ft 2 in (1.88 m)	200 lb (91 kg)	August 29, 1946	Wichita State
PG	12	Henry Logan	6 ft 0 in (1.83 m)	180 lb (82 kg)	March 14, 1946	Western Carolina
SF	34	Doug Moe	6 ft 5 in (1.96 m)	215 lb (98 kg)	September 21, 1938	North Carolina
SG	40	Mel Peterson	6 ft 4 in (1.93 m)	185 lb (84 kg)	March 23, 1938	Wheaton College

Coaches
Head coach
- Alex Hannum

Legend
- (DP) Unsigned draft pick
- (FA) Free agent
- (S) Suspended
- Injured

Roster

== Season standings ==
Team	W	L	PCT.	GB
Oakland Oaks	60	18	.769	-
New Orleans Buccaneers	46	32	.590	14
Denver Rockets	44	34	.564	16
Dallas Chaparrals	41	37	.526	19
Los Angeles Stars	33	45	.423	27
Houston Mavericks	23	55	.295	37

== ABA Playoffs ==
ABA Western Division Semifinals

Game	Date	Location	Score	Record	Attendance
1	April 5	Oakland	129–99	1–0	2,358
2	April 6	Oakland	119–122	1–1	1,580
3	April 8	Denver	121–99	2–1	5,062
4	April 10	Denver	108–109	2–2	5,431
5	April 12	Oakland	128–118	3–2	3,156
6	April 13	Denver	115–126	3–3	6,481
7	April 16	Oakland	115–102	4–3	5,123

Oaks win series, 4–3

ABA Division Finals

Game	Date	Location	Score	Record	Attendance
1	April 19	Oakland	128–118	1–0	2,848
2	April 21	Oakland	135–124	2–0	1,749
3	April 23	New Orleans	113–107	3–0	4,253
4	April 25	New Orleans	128–114	4–0	3,583

Oaks win series, 4–0

ABA Finals

Game	Date	Location	Score	Record	Attendance
1	April 30	Oakland	123–114	1–0	3,290
2	May 2	Oakland	122–150	1–1	4,171
3	May 3	Indiana	134–126 (OT)	2–1	8,467
4	May 5	Indiana	144–117	3–1	7,133
5	May 7	Oakland	135–131 (OT)	4–1	6,340

Oaks win championship series, 4–1

For scoring 21.5 points per game with 9.7 rebounds per game during the playoffs, rookie guard Warren Jabali was named Playoffs MVP.

== Awards, records, and honors ==
- 1969 ABA All-Star Game
  - Doug Moe
  - Larry Brown
  - Rick Barry
- Warren Jabali – ABA Rookie of the Year
- 1969 ABA Playoffs Champions
  - Warren Jabali – ABA Playoffs MVP
