= Trooper Washington =

American basketball player

Personal information
- Born: April 21, 1944 Philadelphia, Pennsylvania, U.S.
- Died: November 20, 2004 (aged 60) McKeesport, Pennsylvania, U.S.
- Listed height: 6 ft 7 in (2.01 m)
- Listed weight: 215 lb (98 kg)

Career information
- High school: Edison (Philadelphia, Pennsylvania)
- College: Cheyney (1963–1967)
- NBA draft: 1967: 5th round, 50th overall pick
- Drafted by: Cincinnati Royals
- Playing career: 1967–1973
- Position: Power forward / center
- Number: 32, 14

Career history
- 1967–1970: Pittsburgh / Minnesota Pipers
- 1970: Los Angeles Stars
- 1970–1971: The Floridians
- 1971–1973: New York Nets

Career highlights
- ABA champion (1968); ABA All-Star (1969); ABA All-Rookie Team (1968)
- Stats at Basketball Reference

Thomas "Trooper" Washington (April 21, 1944 – November 19, 2004) was an American professional basketball player born and raised in Philadelphia.

== Biography ==
A 6'7" forward from Cheyney University of Pennsylvania, Washington was drafted in 1967 in the 5th round by the Cincinnati Royals, but he played instead in the American Basketball Association from 1967 to 1973 as a member of the Pittsburgh / Minnesota Pipers, Los Angeles Stars, The Floridians, and New York Nets. He won the 1968 ABA Championship with the Pittsburgh Pipers and appeared in the 1969 ABA All-Star Game. In his ABA career, Washington averaged 10.6 points per game and 10.0 rebounds per game.

== Death ==
Washington died suddenly while coaching his first game as head coach of the Pennsylvania Pit Bulls, a team in a league also called the American Basketball Association.

== Career statistics ==
Legend
GP	Games played	GS	Games started	MPG	Minutes per game
FG%	Field goal percentage	3P%	3-point field goal percentage	FT%	Free throw percentage
RPG	Rebounds per game	APG	Assists per game	SPG	Steals per game
BPG	Blocks per game	PPG	Points per game	**Bold**	Career high
*	Led the league

†	Denotes seasons in which Brown's team won an ABA championship

=== ABA ===
==== Regular season ====
Year	Team	GP	MPG	FG%	3P%	FT%	RPG	APG	PPG
1967–68†	Pittsburgh	63	29.3	.523*	**1.000**	.570	10.7	1.6	11.6
1968–69	Minnesota	69	**38.0**	.502	.000	.601	**12.6**	2.6	**15.0**
1969–70	Pittsburgh	**44**	28.4	.536*	.600	.631	10.1	2.6	9.6
1969–70	Los Angeles	**38**	29.8	.566*	.333	**.667**	10.2	2.2	10.2
1970–71	Florida	57	32.9	.507	.000	.611	10.6	**3.3**	9.4
1971–72	New York	80	31.4	**.571**	–	.645	9.4	2.0	11.0
1972–73	New York	76	26.7	.539	–	.624	7.3	2.7	6.9
Career		426	31.1	.532	.333	.615	10.0	2.4	10.6
All-Star		1	15.0	.400	–	1.000	5.0	1.0	6.0

==== Playoffs ====
Year	Team	GP	MPG	FG%	3P%	FT%	RPG	APG	PPG
1968†	Pittsburgh	15	**40.7**	.531	.000	.491	**17.4**	**2.8**	**14.5**
1969	Minnesota	6	38.3	.419	–	.714	13.2	2.3	11.2
1970	Los Angeles	17*	27.7	**.624**	–	.400	11.1	2.6	7.4
1971	Florida	6	14.7	.350	–	.375	4.8	2.3	2.8
1972	New York	**18**	30.4	.598	–	.583	9.6	2.4	7.9
1973	New York	4	17.0	.545	–	**.750**	4.5	.8	3.8
Career		66	30.5	.542	.000	.525	11.3	2.4	8.9
