= Ken Gardner =

American basketball player (1946–2024)

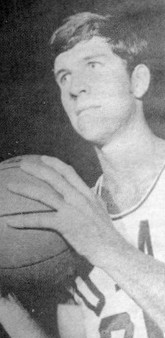
- Gardner, circa 1971

Personal information
- Born: September 27, 1949 Ogden, Utah, U.S.
- Died: May 16, 2024 (aged 74) Herriman, Utah, U.S.
- Listed height: 6 ft 5 in (1.96 m)
- Listed weight: 205 lb (93 kg)

Career information
- High school: Clearfield (Clearfield, Utah)
- College: Utah (1968–1971)
- NBA draft: 1971: 5th round, 82nd overall pick
- Drafted by: Phoenix Suns
- Position: Small forward
- Number: 14

Career history
- 1975: Utah Stars
- Stats at Basketball Reference

Kenneth Kay Gardner (September 27, 1949 – May 16, 2024) was an American basketball player. He is best known for playing for the now-defunct French club AS Berck, with which he won the French National Championship in 1973 and 1974. Gardner went on to play for the also defunct Nice BC of the LNB (French National Basketball League) and the Utah Stars of the ABA during their final season of existence. Gardner was twice named the best American player in France during his five-year career there, during which he averaged 22.8 points per game. His 6,012 career points still rank in the top 100 among all-time scorers in the French league.

Gardner played for the University of Utah in college and ranks top ten in points per game and top five in rebounds per game in the school's history. Gardner was one of only two unanimous selections to the Western Athletic Conference all-conference basketball team in 1971. Gardner was also 2nd Team all-conference as a Junior in 1970. He was named the Most Valuable Player of the 1970 Utah Classic after leading the Utes with 25 points and 20 rebounds in a win over the University of Washington in the championship game.

Gardner died in Herriman, Utah, on May 16, 2024, at the age of 74.

== Career statistics ==
Legend
GP	Games played	GS	Games started	MPG	Minutes per game
FG%	Field goal percentage	3P%	3-point field goal percentage	FT%	Free throw percentage
RPG	Rebounds per game	APG	Assists per game	SPG	Steals per game
BPG	Blocks per game	PPG	Points per game	**Bold**	Career high

=== ABA ===
==== Regular season ====
Year	Team	GP	MPG	FG%	3P%	FT%	RPG	APG	SPG	BPG	PPG
1975–76	Utah	9	5.7	.333	–	1.000	1.4	.3	.2	.1	1.6
