= Al Bianchi =

American basketball player (1932–2019)

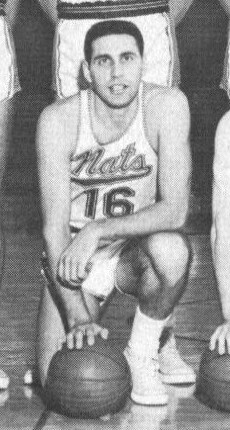
- Bianchi with the Syracuse Nationals in 1958

Personal information
- Born: March 26, 1932 New York City, New York, U.S.
- Died: October 28, 2019 (aged 87) Phoenix, Arizona, U.S.
- Listed height: 6 ft 3 in (1.91 m)
- Listed weight: 185 lb (84 kg)

Career information
- High school: Long Island City (Long Island City, New York)
- College: Bowling Green (1951–1954)
- NBA draft: 1954: 2nd round, 18th overall pick
- Drafted by: Minneapolis Lakers
- Playing career: 1956–1966
- Position: Point guard / shooting guard
- Number: 16, 24
- Coaching career: 1967–1975

Career history

Playing
- 1956–1966: Syracuse Nationals / Philadelphia 76ers

Coaching
- 1967–1969: Seattle SuperSonics
- 1969–1970: Washington Caps
- 1970–1975: Virginia Squires

Career highlights
- As player: First-team All-MAC (1954); As coach: ABA Coach of the Year (1971); ABA All-Star Game head coach (1971)

Career statistics
- Points: 5,550 (8.1 ppg)
- Rebounds: 1,722 (2.5 rpg)
- Assists: 1,497 (2.2 apg)
- Stats at NBA.com
- Stats at Basketball Reference

Alfred A. Bianchi (March 26, 1932 – October 28, 2019) was an American professional basketball player, coach, general manager, consultant, and scout.

== Early years ==
Nicknamed "Blinky", he attended P.S. 4 elementary school and graduated from Long Island City High School in 1950. A 1954 graduate of Bowling Green State University, he was voted to the "All-Ohio Team" and received honorable mention as a basketball All-American. He served in the U.S. Army Medical Corps from 1954 to 1956.

== Professional playing career ==
Starting in 1956, Bianchi played for the Syracuse Nationals of the NBA. He moved with the team to Philadelphia when it became the 76ers for the 1963–64 season. He was one of the last proponents in the NBA of the two-handed set shot.

== Coaching career ==
On May 1, 1966, Bianchi was selected by the Chicago Bulls in the NBA expansion draft but never played in a game for them and retired as a player. He then became assistant coach under former teammate Johnny "Red" Kerr, head coach of the Bulls. After a year in Chicago, he was hired as head coach of the expansion team Seattle SuperSonics, compiling a 53–111 record for the new NBA franchise.

He then became coach and general manager of the Washington Caps/Virginia Squires of the American Basketball Association from 1969 through 1975. In 1971, he won ABA Coach of the Year honors for guiding the Squires to the ABA's Eastern Division championship with a record of 55–29 (.655). The Squires then lost to the New York Nets in the Eastern Division finals, and the Indiana Pacers defeated the Nets in the ABA Finals. He finished his coaching career with a 283–392 record.

== Front office ==
In 1976, he re-entered the NBA to work for head coach John MacLeod as assistant coach for the Phoenix Suns, from 1976 to 1987, a tenure highlighted by the Suns' legendary triple-overtime loss to the Boston Celtics in Game 5 of the NBA finals, won by the Celtics 4 games to 2.

He then moved to the front office as general manager for the New York Knicks from 1987 to 1991. He was fired as Knicks GM on March 1, 1991. Returning to Phoenix in 1991, he scouted college players for the Suns. In 2004, he became a consultant-scout for the Golden State Warriors, where he stayed through the 2008–09 season.

In September 2007, he was inducted into the New York City Basketball Hall of Fame as a player, by the New York City Athletic Club.

Bianchi lived and worked as a consultant in Phoenix.

He was inducted into the Ohio Basketball Hall of Fame at the 11th Annual Ceremony on May 21, 2016, in Columbus.

== Death ==
Bianchi died on October 28, 2019, in Phoenix, Arizona, from congestive heart failure at the age of 87.

== Career statistics ==
Legend
GP	Games played	GS	Games started	MPG	Minutes per game
FG%	Field goal percentage	3P%	3-point field goal percentage	FT%	Free throw percentage
RPG	Rebounds per game	APG	Assists per game	SPG	Steals per game
BPG	Blocks per game	PPG	Points per game	**Bold**	Career high
*	Led the league

=== NBA ===
==== Regular season ====
Year	Team	GP	MPG	FG%	FT%	RPG	APG	PPG
1956–57	Syracuse	68	23.2	.351	.690	3.3	1.6	8.3
1957–58	Syracuse	69	20.6	.344	.683	3.2	1.7	8.3
1958–59	Syracuse	72*	**24.7**	.377	.723	2.8	2.2	10.0
1959–60	Syracuse	69	18.2	.366	.703	2.6	2.4	7.7
1960–61	Syracuse	52	12.8	.345	.690	2.0	1.8	5.7
1961–62	Syracuse	**80***	24.1	.397	.697	**3.5**	**3.3**	**10.3**
1962–63	Syracuse	61	19.0	**.424**	.732	2.2	2.8	7.6
1963–64	Philadelphia	78	18.4	.376	**.773**	1.9	1.9	8.0
1964–65	Philadelphia	60	18.6	.360	.711	1.6	2.3	6.7
1965–66	Philadelphia	78	16.8	.382	.673	1.7	1.7	6.3
Career		687	19.9	.374	.707	2.5	2.2	8.1

==== Playoffs ====
Year	Team	GP	MPG	FG%	FT%	RPG	APG	PPG
1957	Syracuse	5	19.4	.316	.667	3.0	1.6	6.4
1958	Syracuse	2	18.5	.333	.375	3.5	1.0	5.0
1959	Syracuse	9	21.3	**.459**	.636	3.2	2.8	9.1
1960	Syracuse	2	9.0	.000	–	1.5	1.5	.0
1961	Syracuse	7	12.9	.370	**.889**	1.0	.7	6.0
1962	Syracuse	5	**36.8**	.391	.850	**5.2**	**3.6**	**14.2**
1963	Syracuse	5	15.4	.441	.571	1.6	.4	6.8
1964	Philadelphia	5	13.6	.414	.750	.8	.8	5.4
1965	Philadelphia	**11**	28.0	.381	.667	1.5	2.7	9.5
1966	Philadelphia	5	12.8	.419	.750	2.0	.8	9.0
Career		56	20.3	.391	.696	2.2	1.8	8.0

== Coaching record ==
Legend
Regular season	G	Games coached	W	Games won	L	Games lost	W–L %	Win–loss %
Playoffs	PG	Playoff games	PW	Playoff wins	PL	Playoff losses	PW–L %	Playoff win–loss %

=== NBA ===
Team	Year	G	W	L	W–L%	Finish	PG	PW	PL	PW–L%	Result
Seattle	1967–68	82	23	59	.280	5th in Western	—	—	—	—	Missed playoffs
Seattle	1968–69	82	30	52	.366	6th in Western	—	—	—	—	Missed playoffs
Career		164	53	111	.323		—	—	—	—	

=== ABA ===
Team	Year	G	W	L	W–L%	Finish	PG	PW	PL	PW–L%	Result
Washington	1969–70	84	44	40	.524	3rd in Western Division	7	3	4	.429	Lost in Div. semifinals
Virginia	1970–71	84	55	29	.655	1st in Eastern Division	12	6	6	.500	Lost in Div. finals
Virginia	1971–72	84	45	39	.536	2nd in Eastern Division	11	7	4	.636	Lost in Div. finals
Virginia	1972–73	84	42	42	.500	3rd in Eastern Division	5	1	4	.200	Lost in Div. semifinals
Virginia	1973–74	84	28	56	.333	4th in Eastern Division	5	1	4	.200	Lost in Div. semifinals
Virginia	1974–75	84	15	69	.179	5th in Eastern Division	—	—	—	—	Missed playoffs
Virginia	1975–76	7	1	6	.143	Left mid-season	—	—	—	—	
Career		511	230	281	.450		40	18	22	.450	

== See also ==
- List of NBA players who have spent their entire career with one franchise

Preceded by Initial coach	Virginia Squires Head Coach; 1970–1975	Succeeded by Bill Musselman
