= Hal Jeter =

American basketball player (born 1945)

Personal information
- Born: May 17, 1945 (age 81) Aliquippa, Pennsylvania
- Listed height: 6 ft 3 in (1.91 m)
- Listed weight: 190 lb (86 kg)

Career information
- High school: Aliquippa (Aliquippa, Pennsylvania)
- College: Highland CC (1963–1965); Drake (1965–1966)
- NBA draft: 1966: undrafted
- Position: Guard
- Number: 21

Career history
- 1970: Washington Caps

Career highlights
- All-MVC (1966); NJCAA All-American (1965); NJCAA Honorable Mention All-American (1964)
- Stats at Basketball Reference

Harold Jeter (born May 17, 1945) is an American former professional basketball player. He played in the American Basketball Association for the Washington Caps in five games in March 1970.
