= Washington Caps =

- Division: Western Division
- Founded: 1967
- History: Oakland Oaks; 1967–1969; Washington Caps; 1969–1970; Virginia Squires; 1970–1976
- Arena: Washington Coliseum
- Location: Washington, D.C.
- Team colors: Green and yellow
- Head coach: Al Bianchi

The Washington Caps were an American Basketball Association (ABA) team from 1969 through 1970. The franchise had previously been the Oakland Oaks. From 1970 through 1976 the team played as the Virginia Squires.

== Origins ==
With the formation of the ABA in February 1967 a team was awarded to Oakland, California for $30,000 with singer Pat Boone as primary owner. The team was originally the Oakland Americans but the name was eventually changed to the Oakland Oaks. National Basketball Association (NBA) superstar Rick Barry signed with the Oaks, as did Steve Jones and Levern Tart. Barry, however, was prevented from playing in the ABA due to a lawsuit brought by his former NBA team (regarding enforcement of the reserve clause in his contract), so he spent the season as an Oaks radio announcer instead of as a player. The Oaks won the very first ABA game in 1967 (a 132–129 victory against the Anaheim Amigos on October 3, 1967. After Barry returned in the 1967–68 season, they breezed through the regular season, then won the 1969 ABA Championship over the Indiana Pacers in the playoffs. However, the Bank of America was threatening to foreclose on a $1.2 million loan to the team and in August, 1969, a group of investors led by real estate attorney Earl Foreman bought the team and moved it to Washington, D.C., for the upcoming season.

== The lone season (1969–70) ==
With the move came a new identity for the team as the green and gold clad Washington Caps. Al Bianchi replaced the more proven Alex Hannum as head coach. A federal appeals court ruled in favor of the Caps regarding Barry, their top gate attraction, but he openly objected to playing in Washington, D.C., where the team butted heads with the NBA's Baltimore Bullets and did not have a suitable arena to play home games. He sat out the first 32 games of the season, but the courts left him with no choice except to report to the team or sit out the season. Barry and Warren Armstrong participated in the ABA All-Star game, but injuries limited their playing time for the season.

In March 1970 the ABA–NBA merger appeared close at hand under conditions that would have required the Washington Caps to relocate, but a subsequent lawsuit derailed the merger until June 1976.

In defiance of all geographic reality, the Caps assumed the Oaks' place in the Western Division despite their move to the Eastern Seaboard. This kept them constantly on the road at faraway venues (their nearest divisional rivals, the New Orleans Buccaneers, were over 1,000 miles away) and the travel and time difference took its toll on their play. Playing at Washington Coliseum their average attendance was 2,992 fans per game. In a case of exceptionally bad timing, the Caps arrived at a time when the surrounding Near Northeast neighborhood was still recovering from the 1968 race riots. Fears that the neighborhood wasn't safe dragged down attendance. Due to the long travel distances involved in divisional play, the Caps played some home games in places like Wichita, Kansas, and even Mexico City, Mexico, but did not fare well in those supposed home games.

To make matters worse, an intended television deal with WDCA which would have seen them televise 10 games was canceled shortly before Christmas when a dispute over financial guarantees occurred. As a result, only the Caps' season opener versus New Orleans was televised, and then on WTTG with Maury Povich and former Boston Celtic Sam Jones doing commentary.

However, due to a solid record in their real home games, the Caps finished the season with 44 wins and 40 losses. The Caps' record put them in third place in the Western Division, 7 games behind the Denver Rockets and one game behind the Dallas Chaparrals. In the 1970 ABA playoffs the Caps faced the Denver Rockets in the Western Division semifinals and took the series to seven games before losing 143–119 in the finale in Denver.

== Virginia Squires ==
After the conclusion of the 1969–70 season the Caps were forced to move once again. At the time, merger talks with the NBA were first underway, and the owner of the NBA's Baltimore Bullets, Abe Pollin, wanted to move his team to Washington and didn't want the Caps franchise there. The other ABA owners persuaded Foreman to move the Caps for the second time in as many seasons. (However, the Caps name would be somewhat revived, this time for a National Hockey League expansion team called the Washington Capitals — also owned by Pollin — in 1974. Since then, the Capitals have been co-tenants with the Bullets/Wizards franchise at the Capital Centre and Capital One Arena.)

Foreman decided to make the Caps a regional franchise in the nearby state of Virginia, called the Virginia Squires. While the team would be based in Norfolk and play most of their games at both the Norfolk Scope and the Old Dominion University Fieldhouse, they also played home games in Hampton at the Hampton Roads Coliseum, in Richmond at the Richmond Coliseum, and in Roanoke at the Roanoke Civic Center. However, Roanoke was dropped from the list of "home" cities after only one season of play there. The Squires' colors were red, white, and blue.

The Squires would continue to play in every ABA season until 1976. At the conclusion of the 1975–76 season, the Squires, having fallen on hard times after making a promising start early on in Virginia, were unable to make a league-mandated financial assessment. The Squires were disbanded after the regular season, but just prior to the conclusion of the 1976 ABA playoffs in May 1976 and the eventual ABA–NBA merger a month later in June 1976.

== Basketball Hall of Famers ==
Washington Caps Hall of Famers
Players
No.	Name	Position	Tenure	Inducted
24	Rick Barry	F	1969–1970	1987
11	Larry Brown	G	1970–1971	2002

== Season-by-season ==
Note: W = wins, L = losses, % = win–loss %

Season	W	L	%	Playoffs	Results
Washington Caps
1969–70	44	40	.524	Lost Division Semifinals	Denver 4, Washington 3
