= Virginia Squires =

Basketball team in Norfolk, Virginia

- Conference: None
- Division: Eastern Division (No division during 1975–76)
- Founded: 1967
- Folded: 1976
- History: Oakland Oaks; 1967–1969; Washington Caps; 1969–1970; Virginia Squires; 1970–1976
- Arena: Hampton Coliseum (1970–76); Norfolk Scope (1971–76); Richmond Coliseum (1971–76, occasional games); Old Dominion University Fieldhouse (1970–71, occasional games); Richmond Arena (1970–71); Roanoke Civic Center (1971–72)
- Location: Norfolk, Virginia; Hampton, Virginia; Richmond, Virginia; Roanoke, Virginia
- Team colors: 1970–74: Red, White & Blue 1974–75: Orange, Seal Brown & Red; 1975–76: Blue and Orange
- Head coach: Al Bianchi (1970–1975); Mack Calvin (1975); Bill Musselman (1975–1976); Jack Ankerson (1976); Zelmo Beaty (1976)
- Ownership: Earl Foreman 1970–1975
- Division titles: 1 (1971)

The Virginia Squires were a basketball team based in Norfolk, Virginia, and playing in several other Virginia cities. They were members of the American Basketball Association (ABA) from 1970 to 1976.

The team originated in 1967 as the Oakland Oaks, an ABA charter franchise based in Oakland, California. They moved to Washington, D.C. as the Washington Caps in 1969 but moved to Norfolk the following year, becoming the Squires. As a regional team, they played home games in Richmond, Hampton, and Roanoke as well as a season with Norfolk. The team folded in 1976, just a month before the ABA–NBA merger commenced.

== In Oakland ==
The Squires were founded in 1967 as the Oakland Oaks, a charter member of the ABA. The team colors were green and gold. An earlier Oakland Oaks basketball team played in the American Basketball League (1961–62) in 1962. (The short-lived league folded on December 31, 1962.)

The Oaks were owned in part by pop singer Pat Boone. There was a major contract dispute with the cross-bay San Francisco Warriors of the established National Basketball Association over the rights to star player Rick Barry. He was a former NBA Rookie of the Year who had led the Warriors to the NBA Finals in the same year the Oaks had formed, but due to being angered by management's failure to pay him certain incentive awards he felt he was due, he sat out the 1967–68 season, and the following season joined the Oaks, leading the franchise to its one and only ABA championship in 1969.

However, even with Barry, the team proved to be a very poor investment for Boone and his co-owners. Despite winning the ABA championship, the Oaks were an abysmal failure at the box office, due in large part to the proximity of the NBA Warriors who at the time were also playing some home games in Oakland (and eventually moved to Oakland in 1971). At one point they only drew 2,500 fans per game.

== In Washington ==
Facing foreclosure due to a major loan from the Bank of America, Boone sold the team to Washington, D.C. lawyer Earl Foreman, who moved the team to Washington for the 1969–70 season as the Washington Caps. The team colors of green and gold were retained, but the logo was a red, white, and blue rendition of the United States Capitol. They played at the Washington Coliseum. However, for reasons that remain unknown, they remained in the Western Division—forcing them on the longest road trips in the league. Attendance was no better in Washington than it was in Oakland. The Coliseum had been built in 1941, and had not aged well. In a case of exceptionally bad timing, the Caps arrived at a time when the surrounding Near Northeast neighborhood was still recovering from the 1968 race riots. Fears that the neighborhood wasn't safe dragged down attendance. They managed to finish four games above .500, but lost in the first round to the powerful Denver Rockets.

== In Virginia ==
Merger talks with the NBA were already underway entering the 1970s, but a major stumbling block was the presence of the Caps in Washington. Baltimore Bullets owner Abe Pollin wanted to move his team to Washington, but did not want the Caps there. The other ABA owners persuaded Foreman to move the Caps for the second time in as many seasons. Foreman decided to make the Caps a regional franchise, the Virginia Squires.

The team would be based in Norfolk and played most of their games at the Norfolk Scope and the Old Dominion University Fieldhouse. They also played home games in Hampton at the Hampton Coliseum, in Richmond at the Richmond Coliseum, and in Roanoke at the Roanoke Civic Center. However, Roanoke was dropped from the list of "home" cities after only one season of play there. The Squires' colors were red, white, and blue. Branding as a statewide team ultimately cost the Squires any goodwill they might have otherwise earned from Pollin. While the Squires never played any games in Northern Virginia, Pollin still believed the team was making a brazen attempt at prying away fans who otherwise mostly support Washington sports teams. He thus strenuously objected to Virginia being part of any merger with the NBA (to the point where the first merger plan in 1971 sought to exclude the Squires franchise unless they moved to a new location instead).

Rick Barry, who originally played with the inaugural Oaks, appeared on the August 24, 1970, front cover of Sports Illustrated in a Squires uniform; in the accompanying article inside the magazine, Barry made several negative remarks about the Commonwealth of Virginia. (He angered Southerners by remarking that he did not want his children to grow up saying, "Hi, y'all, Dad.") On September 1, 1970, the Squires traded Barry to the New York Nets for a draft pick and $200,000 (though only officially got $25,000 out of the deal). While the negative comments had been a contributing factor to the trade, it primarily came because Foreman was still bogged down by financial troubles and had to sell Barry in order to help meet his expenses instead, with the ironic part being that Barry had previously mentioned being let go for a higher value than that by comparison in $100,000.

The Squires played most of their games at Old Dominion University's fieldhouse in their first season as a "regional" franchise, with other matches at the Richmond Arena, Hampton Coliseum (which was named Hampton Roads Coliseum at the time), and Roanoke Civic Center. In spite of the initial controversy surrounding Barry, the Squires finished their inaugural season in Virginia by winning the Eastern Division by 11 games. They defeated the Nets in the first round of the ABA playoffs but went on to be upset by the Kentucky Colonels.

In 1971, the Squires made what would be their biggest draft pick ever by drafting Julius Erving from the University of Massachusetts Amherst. During the 1971–72 season, Erving became an instant sensation with his scoring prowess and dazzling on-court acrobatics; the Squires defeated The Floridians in the first round of the playoffs, but lost to the New York Nets in the second round.

The 1972–73 season marked the beginning of the end for the Squires. Although blessed with a combination of Julius Erving ("Dr. J") and a young George Gervin, the duo only played together late in the season. The Squires lost to their division rivals out in Kentucky during the first round of the playoffs. During the summer of 1973, Dr. J was traded along with Willie Sojourner to the Nets for George Carter and cash.

During the 1974 ABA All-Star Weekend, rumors abounded that Gervin was about to be sold to the San Antonio Spurs. These rumors became fact on January 30, when the Squires sold Gervin to the Spurs for $225,000. ABA commissioner Mike Storen tried to block the sale on the grounds that selling the team's last true star was not in the best interest of the league. However, the sale was eventually upheld.

While the trades may have provided enough short-term financing to help keep the Squires in business, the loss of so much talent that had been acquired by the franchise (primarily with fantastic draft choices) angered the fans. The Squires' attendance fell through the floor and never recovered. The Squires' final two seasons in the ABA were an unmitigated disaster, with losses mounting up and long-time popular coach Al Bianchi eventually being fired. The 1974–75 and 1975–76 teams only won a total of 30 games, the worst winning percentages in ABA history. The team was coming unraveled off the court as well. In 1974, Barry Parkhill sued the team after his paychecks bounced. The Squires had nearly shut down for good in February 1976 and nearly forced the ABA to complete their season with only six teams instead. They were only able to finish the season thanks to a sale of advertising banners combined with a $250,000 loan from a local bank.

As it turned out, this only bought the franchise three more months of life. On May 11, 1976 — only a month after the end of the regular season and two days before the end of the 1976 ABA playoffs — the ABA canceled the franchise after it missed a deadline to reimburse players for $120,000 in back pay and meet a $75,000 assessment. The Squires stood no chance of being included in any merger, even without Pollin's continued opposition and their ramshackle financial situation. The NBA did not consider regional franchises to be viable. For example, the league's first regional franchise, the Carolina Cougars, were forced to move to St. Louis despite being one of the league's stronger franchises. As was the case with the Cougars, none of the Squires' home cities were nearly large enough to support an NBA team on their own. Nevertheless, the Squires' premature contraction cost them a chance to be compensated as part of the merger, which closed only a month later.

== Basketball Hall of Famers ==
Virginia Squires Hall of Famers
Players
No.	Name	Position	Tenure	Inducted
32	Julius Erving	F	1971–1973	1993
44	George Gervin	G/F	1972–1974	1996
11	Larry Brown	G	1970–1971	2002
33	Charlie Scott	G	1970–1972	2018
—N/a	Zelmo Beaty	Head coach	1975–1976	2016

== Season-by-season ==
Season	League	Division	Finish	W	L	Win%	Playoffs	Awards
Virginia Squires
1970–71	ABA	Eastern	1st	55	29	.655	Won Division Semifinals (Nets) 4–2; Lost Division Finals (Colonels) 2–4	Al Bianchi (ABA COY); Charlie Scott (ABA ROY)
1971–72	ABA	Eastern	2nd	45	39	.536	Won Division Semifinals (Floridians) 4–0; Lost Division Finals (Nets) 3–4	–
1972–73	ABA	Eastern	3rd	42	42	.500	Lost Division Semifinals (Colonels) 1–4	–
1973–74	ABA	Eastern	4th	28	56	.333	Lost Division Semifinals (Nets) 1–4	–
1974–75	ABA	Eastern	5th	15	69	.179	Did not qualify	–
1975–76	ABA	Eastern	7th	15	68	.181	Did not qualify	–

=== Home venues ===
Arena	Location	Seating	Years
Hampton Roads Coliseum	Hampton	9,777	1970–76
ODU Fieldhouse	Norfolk	5,200	1970–71
Roanoke Civic Center	Roanoke	9,828	1971–72
Norfolk Scope	Norfolk	10,253	1971–76
Richmond Coliseum	Richmond	12,500	1971–76

== See also ==
- Richmond Rhythm
- Roanoke Dazzle
