= List of NBA arenas =

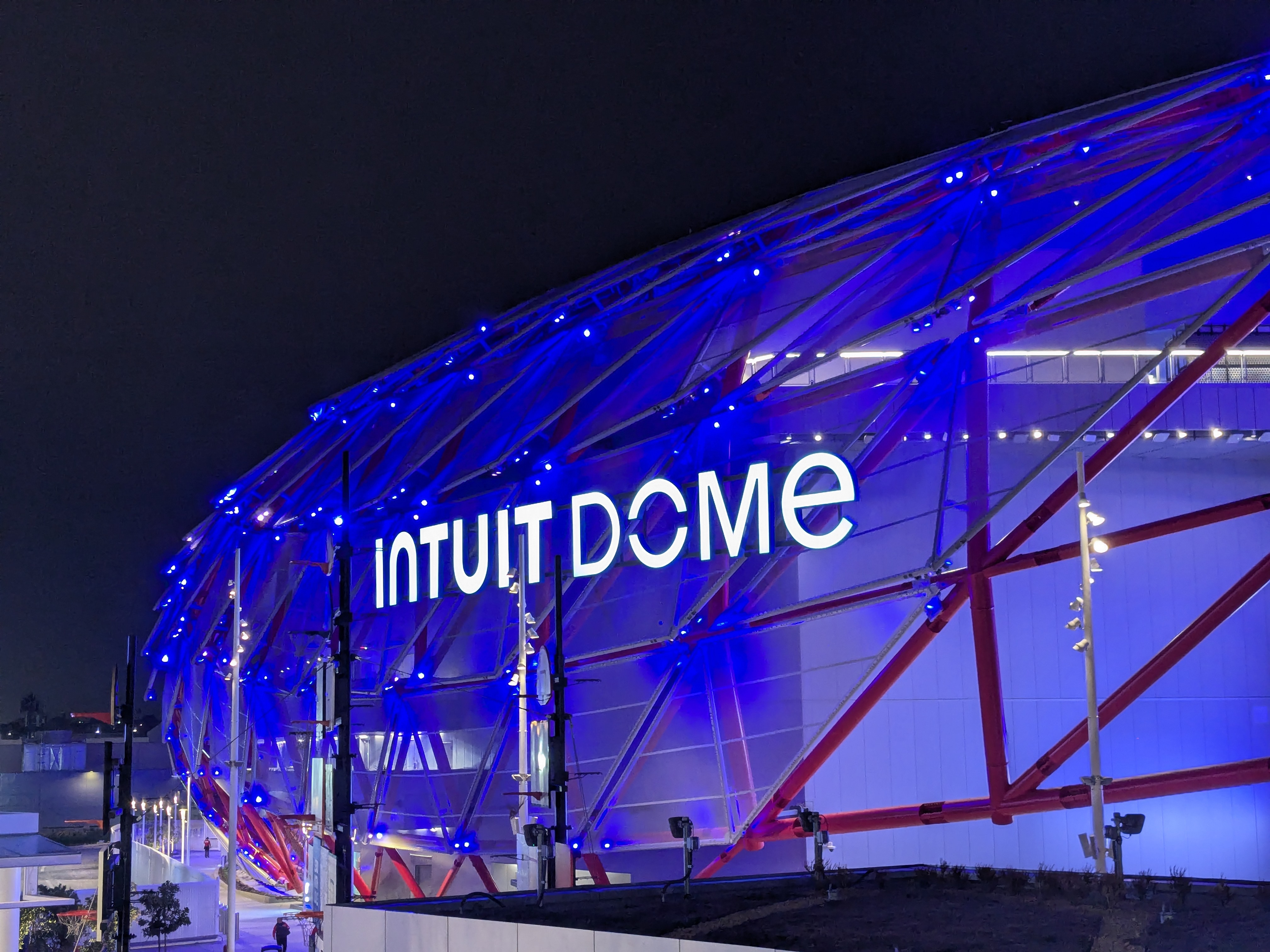
Intuit Dome, the newest arena in the NBA, opened in 2024. It is the home of the Los Angeles Clippers.

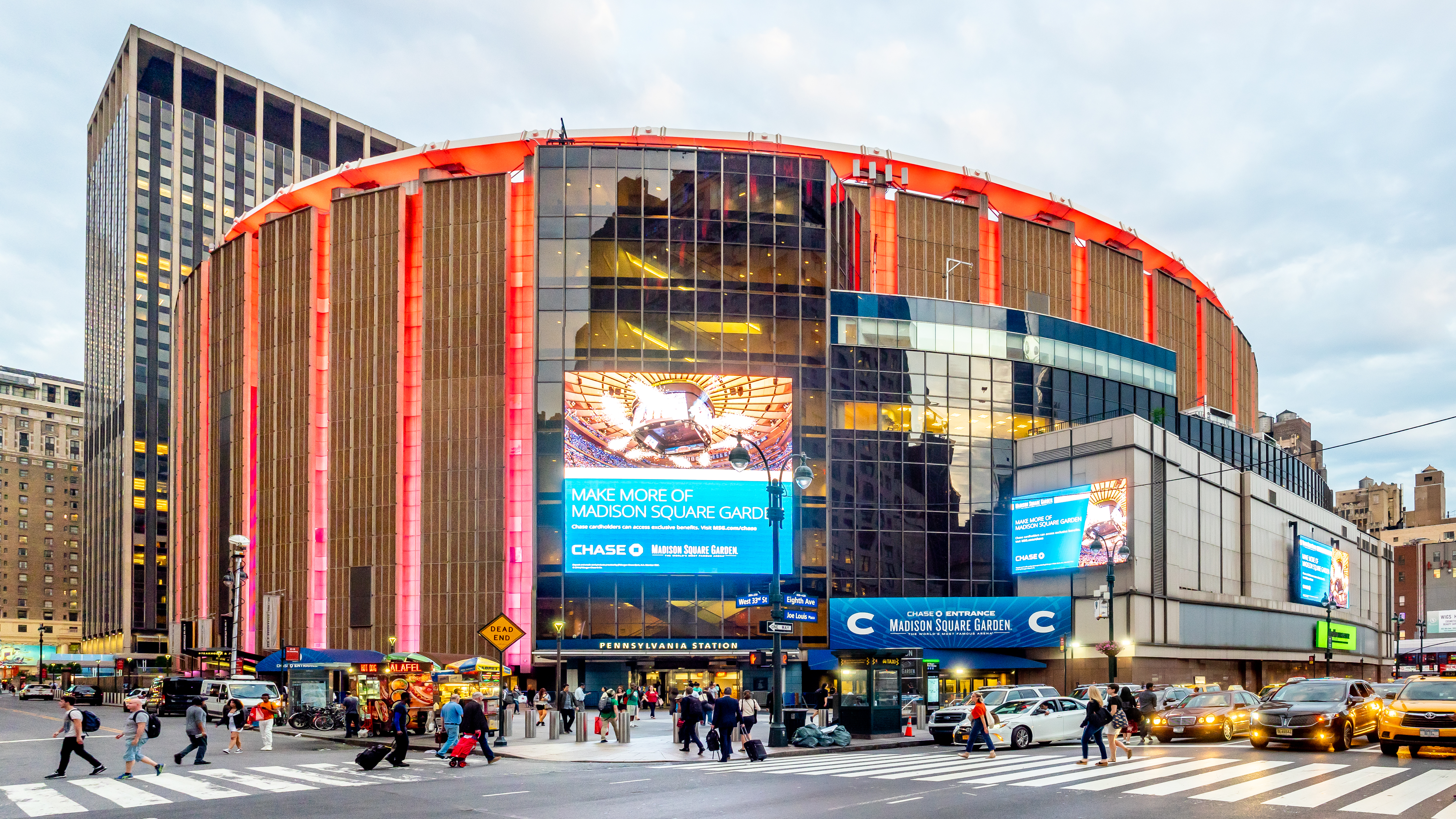
Madison Square Garden, the home of the New York Knicks, is the oldest arena in the NBA; it first opened in 1968. However, it underwent a major renovation from 2010 to 2013, resulting in a brand new arena bowl and concourses inside the original structure.

The following list includes all current and former arenas used by current and defunct teams playing in the National Basketball Association (NBA). Other information included in this list are arena locations, seating capacities, years opened, and in use.

Intuit Dome is the newest arena in the NBA, which opened in August 2024. The United Center has the highest capacity of any current NBA arena at 20,917. Madison Square Garden is the only current arena not to be named after a corporate sponsor.

== Current arenas ==
Image	Arena	Location	Team	Capacity	Opened	Season of first NBA game	Ref
	American Airlines Center	Dallas, Texas	Dallas Mavericks	19,200	2001	2001–02	
	Ball Arena	Denver, Colorado	Denver Nuggets	19,520	1999	1999–2000	
	Barclays Center	Brooklyn, New York	Brooklyn Nets	17,732	2012	2012–13	
	Capital One Arena	Washington, D.C.	Washington Wizards	20,333	1997	1997–98	
	Chase Center	San Francisco, California	Golden State Warriors	18,064	2019	2019–20	
	Crypto.com Arena	Los Angeles, California	Los Angeles Lakers	18,997	1999	1999–2000	
	Delta Center	Salt Lake City, Utah	Utah Jazz	18,306	1991	1991–92	
	FedExForum	Memphis, Tennessee	Memphis Grizzlies	17,794	2004	2004–05	
	Fiserv Forum	Milwaukee, Wisconsin	Milwaukee Bucks	17,341	2018	2018–19	
	Frost Bank Center	San Antonio, Texas	San Antonio Spurs	18,354	2002	2002–03	
	Gainbridge Fieldhouse	Indianapolis, Indiana	Indiana Pacers	17,923	1999	1999–2000	
	Golden 1 Center	Sacramento, California	Sacramento Kings	17,611	2016	2016–17	
	Intuit Dome	Inglewood, California	Los Angeles Clippers	18,000	2024	2024–25	
	Kaseya Center	Miami, Florida	Miami Heat	19,600	1999	1999–2000	
	Kia Center	Orlando, Florida	Orlando Magic	18,846	2010	2010–11	
	Little Caesars Arena	Detroit, Michigan	Detroit Pistons	20,332	2017	2017–18	
	Madison Square Garden	New York, New York	New York Knicks	19,812	1968 (Note: Underwent extensive renovations from 2010 to 2013, resulting in a completely new arena bowl and concourses within the original structure.)	1967–68	
	Moda Center	Portland, Oregon	Portland Trail Blazers	19,411	1995	1995–96	
	Mortgage Matchup Center	Phoenix, Arizona	Phoenix Suns	17,071	1992	1992–93	
	Paycom Center	Oklahoma City, Oklahoma	Oklahoma City Thunder	18,203	2002	2005–06 (Note: The arena hosted the New Orleans/Oklahoma City Hornets during the 2005–06 and 2006–07 seasons, and the Oklahoma City Thunder beginning with the 2008–09 season.)	
	Rocket Arena	Cleveland, Ohio	Cleveland Cavaliers	19,432	1994	1994–95	
	Scotiabank Arena	Toronto, Ontario	Toronto Raptors	19,800	1999	1998–99	
	Smoothie King Center	New Orleans, Louisiana	New Orleans Pelicans	16,867	1999	2002–03	
	Spectrum Center	Charlotte, North Carolina	Charlotte Hornets	19,077	2005	2005–06	
	State Farm Arena	Atlanta, Georgia	Atlanta Hawks	17,044	1999	1999–2000	
	Target Center	Minneapolis, Minnesota	Minnesota Timberwolves	18,024	1990	1990–91	
	TD Garden	Boston, Massachusetts	Boston Celtics	18,624	1995	1995–96	
	Toyota Center	Houston, Texas	Houston Rockets	18,055	2003	2003–04	
	United Center	Chicago, Illinois	Chicago Bulls	20,917	1994	1994–95	
	Xfinity Mobile Arena	Philadelphia, Pennsylvania	Philadelphia 76ers	20,007	1996	1996–97	

== Future or proposed arenas ==
Under construction
Arena	Team	Location	Capacity	Opening	Reference
Continental Coliseum	Oklahoma City Thunder	Oklahoma City, Oklahoma	TBD	2028	

Proposed
Arena	Team	Location	Capacity	Opening	Reference
New South Philadelphia Arena	Philadelphia 76ers	Philadelphia, Pennsylvania	TBD	2030	
New Dallas Arena	Dallas Mavericks	Dallas, Texas	TBD	2031	
New Spurs Arena	San Antonio Spurs	San Antonio, Texas	TBD	2032	

== Former arenas ==
Eastern Conference
Atlantic Division
Team	Arena	Years used	Capacity	Opened	Location	Ref.
Boston Celtics
Boston Celtics	Hartford Civic Center; XL Center (2007–2025); PeoplesBank Arena (2025–present)	1975–1995 (occasionally for home games)	16,294	1975	Hartford, Connecticut	
Boston Celtics	Boston Garden; Boston Madison Square Garden (1928)	1946–1995	14,890	1928	Boston, Massachusetts	
Boston Celtics	Boston Arena; Matthews Arena (1982–present)	1946–1947 (partial schedule)	5,900s	1910	Boston, Massachusetts	
Brooklyn Nets New Jersey Nets New York Nets New Jersey Americans
Brooklyn Nets New Jersey Nets New York Nets New Jersey Americans	Prudential Center	2010–2012	18,711	2007	Newark, New Jersey	
Brooklyn Nets New Jersey Nets New York Nets New Jersey Americans	Izod Center; Meadowlands Arena (2015–present); Continental Airlines Arena (1996–2007); Brendan Byrne Arena (1981–1996)	1981–2010	20,049	1981	East Rutherford, New Jersey	
Brooklyn Nets New Jersey Nets New York Nets New Jersey Americans	Rutgers Athletic Center; Louis Brown Athletic Center (1986–present)	1977–1981	8,500	1977	Piscataway, New Jersey	
Brooklyn Nets New Jersey Nets New York Nets New Jersey Americans	Nassau Coliseum	1972–1977	14,890	1972	Uniondale, New York	
Brooklyn Nets New Jersey Nets New York Nets New Jersey Americans	Island Garden	1969–1972	5,200	1956	West Hempstead, New York	
Brooklyn Nets New Jersey Nets New York Nets New Jersey Americans	Long Island Arena; Commack Arena	1968–1969	6,000	1957	Commack, New York	
Brooklyn Nets New Jersey Nets New York Nets New Jersey Americans	Teaneck Armory	1967–1968	5,500	1936	Teaneck, New Jersey	
New York Knicks
New York Knicks	Madison Square Garden (III)	1946–1968	16,000	1925	New York City, New York	
New York Knicks	69th Regiment Armory	1946–1960 (partial schedule)	5,000	1906	New York City, New York	
Philadelphia 76ers Syracuse Nationals
Philadelphia 76ers Syracuse Nationals	The Spectrum; Wachovia Spectrum (2003–2009); First Union Spectrum (1998–2003); CoreStates Spectrum (1994–1998)	1967–1996 (Note: Also hosted one game in the 2008–09 season as part of the franchise's 60th season celebrations and the final sporting events held at the Spectrum.)	18,176	1967	Philadelphia, Pennsylvania	
Philadelphia 76ers Syracuse Nationals	Municipal Auditorium	1963–1967	12,000	1930	Philadelphia, Pennsylvania	
Philadelphia 76ers Syracuse Nationals	Philadelphia Arena	1963–1967	7,000	1920	Philadelphia, Pennsylvania	
Philadelphia 76ers Syracuse Nationals	Onondaga War Memorial	1951–1963	6,230	1951	Syracuse, New York	
Philadelphia 76ers Syracuse Nationals	State Fair Coliseum	1949–1951	7,500	1927	Syracuse, New York	
Toronto Raptors
Toronto Raptors	Benchmark International Arena; Amalie Arena (2014–2025); Tampa Bay Times Forum (2012–2014); St. Pete Times Forum (2002–2012); Ice Palace (1996–2002)	2020–2021 (Note: The Raptors played all of their home games at Amalie Arena for the 2020–21 season because of travel restrictions imposed by the Canadian government due to the ongoing COVID-19 pandemic.)	20,500	1996	Tampa, Florida	
Toronto Raptors	SkyDome; Rogers Centre (2005–present)	1995–1999	28,708	1989	Toronto, Ontario	
Toronto Raptors	Maple Leaf Gardens	1997–1999 (for six home games)	17,000	1931	Toronto, Ontario	
Toronto Raptors	Copps Coliseum; TD Coliseum (2025–present); Hamilton Arena (2024–2025); FirstOntario Centre (2014–2024)	1995–1998 (for three home games)	18,800	1985	Hamilton, Ontario	
Southeast Division
Team	Arena	Years used	Capacity	Opened	Location	Ref.
Atlanta Hawks St. Louis Hawks Milwaukee Hawks Tri-Cities Blackhawks
Atlanta Hawks St. Louis Hawks Milwaukee Hawks Tri-Cities Blackhawks	Georgia Dome	1997–1999 (partial schedule, primary stadium)	71,228	1992	Atlanta, Georgia	
Atlanta Hawks St. Louis Hawks Milwaukee Hawks Tri-Cities Blackhawks	Lakefront Arena	1984–1985 (partial schedule)	8,933	1983	New Orleans, Louisiana	
Atlanta Hawks St. Louis Hawks Milwaukee Hawks Tri-Cities Blackhawks	Omni Coliseum	1972–1997	16,378	1972	Atlanta, Georgia	
Atlanta Hawks St. Louis Hawks Milwaukee Hawks Tri-Cities Blackhawks	Alexander Memorial Coliseum; Hank McCamish Pavilion (2012–present); Alexander Memorial Coliseum at McDonald's Center (1996–2005)	1997–1999 (partial schedule, secondary stadium); 1968–1972	9,191	1956	Atlanta, Georgia	
Atlanta Hawks St. Louis Hawks Milwaukee Hawks Tri-Cities Blackhawks	Kiel Auditorium	1955–1968	9,300	1934	St. Louis, Missouri	
Atlanta Hawks St. Louis Hawks Milwaukee Hawks Tri-Cities Blackhawks	St. Louis Arena; The Checkerdome (1977–1983)	1955–1968 (partial schedule)	20,000	1929	St. Louis, Missouri	
Atlanta Hawks St. Louis Hawks Milwaukee Hawks Tri-Cities Blackhawks	Milwaukee Arena; UW–Milwaukee Panther Arena (2014–present); U.S. Cellular Arena (2000–2014); Wisconsin Center Arena (1998–2000); MECCA Arena (1974–1995)	1951–1955	10,783	1950	Milwaukee, Wisconsin	
Atlanta Hawks St. Louis Hawks Milwaukee Hawks Tri-Cities Blackhawks	Wharton Field House	1946–1951	6,000	1928	Moline, Illinois	
Charlotte Hornets Charlotte Bobcats Charlotte Hornets (original)
Charlotte Hornets Charlotte Bobcats Charlotte Hornets (original)	Charlotte Coliseum	1988–2002 (original Hornets); 2004–2005 (Bobcats)	24,042	1988	Charlotte, North Carolina	
Miami Heat
Miami Heat	Miami Arena	1988–1999	15,200	1988	Miami, Florida	
Orlando Magic
Orlando Magic	Amway Arena; The Arena in Orlando (2006); TD Waterhouse Centre (1999–2006); Orlando Arena (1989–1999)	1989–2010	17,283	1989	Orlando, Florida	
Washington Wizards Washington Bullets Capital Bullets Baltimore Bullets Chicago Zephyrs Chicago Packers
Washington Wizards Washington Bullets Capital Bullets Baltimore Bullets Chicago Zephyrs Chicago Packers	US Airways Arena; Capital Centre (1973–1993, 1997–2002)	1973–1997	18,756	1973	Lake Arbor, Maryland	
Washington Wizards Washington Bullets Capital Bullets Baltimore Bullets Chicago Zephyrs Chicago Packers	Baltimore Civic Center; CFG Bank Arena (2022–present); Royal Farms Arena (2014–2022); 1st Mariner Arena (2003–2013); Baltimore Arena (1986–2003)	1989–1997 (partial schedule); 1963–1973	11,271	1962	Baltimore, Maryland	
Washington Wizards Washington Bullets Capital Bullets Baltimore Bullets Chicago Zephyrs Chicago Packers	Chicago Coliseum	1962–1963	7,000	1899	Chicago, Illinois	
Washington Wizards Washington Bullets Capital Bullets Baltimore Bullets Chicago Zephyrs Chicago Packers	International Amphitheatre	1961–1962	9,000	1934	Chicago, Illinois	
Central Division
Team	Arena	Years used	Capacity	Opened	Location	Ref.
Chicago Bulls
Chicago Bulls	Chicago Stadium	1967–1994	18,676	1929	Chicago, Illinois	
Chicago Bulls	International Amphitheatre	1966–1967	9,000	1934	Chicago, Illinois	
Cleveland Cavaliers
Cleveland Cavaliers	Richfield Coliseum	1974–1994	20,273	1974	Richfield, Ohio	
Cleveland Cavaliers	Cleveland Arena	1970–1974	10,000	1937	Cleveland, Ohio	
Detroit Pistons Fort Wayne (Zollner) Pistons
Detroit Pistons Fort Wayne (Zollner) Pistons	The Palace of Auburn Hills	1988–2017	22,076	1988	Auburn Hills, Michigan	
Detroit Pistons Fort Wayne (Zollner) Pistons	Joe Louis Arena	1984–1985 (partial schedule) (Note: Due to a severe snowstorm that ripped open the Pontiac Silverdome roof, the Pistons played the remaining ten regular season and five playoff home games at Joe Louis Arena. The arena also hosted Game 5 of the 1984 NBA playoffs against the New York Knicks due to a scheduling conflict at Pontiac Silverdome.)	20,153	1979	Detroit, Michigan	
Detroit Pistons Fort Wayne (Zollner) Pistons	Pontiac Silverdome; Pontiac Metropolitan Stadium (1975)	1978–1988	33,000	1975	Pontiac, Michigan	
Detroit Pistons Fort Wayne (Zollner) Pistons	Cobo Arena	1961–1978	12,191	1960	Detroit, Michigan	
Detroit Pistons Fort Wayne (Zollner) Pistons	Olympia Stadium	1957–1961	15,000	1927	Detroit, Michigan	
Detroit Pistons Fort Wayne (Zollner) Pistons	War Memorial Coliseum	1952–1957	10,000	1952	Fort Wayne, Indiana	
Detroit Pistons Fort Wayne (Zollner) Pistons	North Side High School Gym	1948–1952	3,000	1927	Fort Wayne, Indiana	
Indiana Pacers
Indiana Pacers	Market Square Arena	1974–1999	16,530	1974	Indianapolis, Indiana	
Indiana Pacers	Indiana State Fairgrounds Coliseum; Corteva Coliseum (2024–present); Indiana Farmers Coliseum (2015–2024); Fairgrounds Coliseum (2014); Pepsi Coliseum (1998–2014)	1967–1974	10,000	1939	Indianapolis, Indiana	
Milwaukee Bucks
Milwaukee Bucks	Bradley Center; BMO Harris Bradley Center (2012–2018)	1988–2018	18,717	1988	Milwaukee, Wisconsin	
Milwaukee Bucks	MECCA Arena; UW–Milwaukee Panther Arena (2014–present); U.S. Cellular Arena (2000–2014); Wisconsin Center Arena (1998–2000); Milwaukee Arena (1968–1974, 1995–1998)	1968–1988 (Note: Also hosted one game in the 2017–18 season as part of the franchise's 50th season celebrations.)	10,783	1950	Milwaukee, Wisconsin	

Western Conference
Southwest Division
Team	Arena	Years used	Capacity	Opened	Location	Ref.
Dallas Mavericks
Dallas Mavericks	Reunion Arena	1980–2001 (Note: Due to a World Championship Tennis event at Reunion Arena, the Mavericks played Game 5 of the 1984 Western Conference first round against the Seattle SuperSonics at Moody Coliseum.)	18,293	1980	Dallas, Texas	
Houston Rockets San Diego Rockets
Houston Rockets San Diego Rockets	The Summit; Lakewood Church Central Campus (2003–present); Compaq Center (1998–2003)	1975–2003	16,285	1975	Houston, Texas	
Houston Rockets San Diego Rockets	Hofheinz Pavilion; Fertitta Center (2018–present)	1971–1975 (Note: The Rockets also played a few home games at the Astrodome and the Astrohall during this period.)	10,000	1969	Houston, Texas	
Houston Rockets San Diego Rockets	San Diego Sports Arena; Pechanga Arena (2018–present); Valley View Casino Center (2010–2018) iPayOne Center (2005–2007); San Diego International Sports Center (1966–1970)	1967–1971	14,500	1966	San Diego, California	
Memphis Grizzlies Vancouver Grizzlies
Memphis Grizzlies Vancouver Grizzlies	Pyramid Arena	2001–2004	20,142	1991	Memphis, Tennessee	
Memphis Grizzlies Vancouver Grizzlies	General Motors Place; Rogers Arena (2010–present)	1995–2001	19,193	1995	Vancouver, British Columbia	
New Orleans Pelicans New Orleans Hornets New Orleans/Oklahoma City Hornets	Ford Center; Paycom Center (2021–present); Chesapeake Energy Arena (2011–2021); Oklahoma City Arena (2010–2011)	2005–2007 (bulk of schedule) (Note: During the 2005–06 season, the Hornets also played one game each at the Pete Maravich Assembly Center and the Lloyd Noble Center in addition to Ford Center and New Orleans Arena.)	19,164	2002	Oklahoma City, Oklahoma	
San Antonio Spurs Texas Chaparrals Dallas Chaparrals
San Antonio Spurs Texas Chaparrals Dallas Chaparrals	Alamodome	1993–2002 (Note: Also hosted one game in the 2022–23 season as part of the franchise's 50th season celebration.)	20,557	1993	San Antonio, Texas	
San Antonio Spurs Texas Chaparrals Dallas Chaparrals	HemisFair Arena	1973–1993	16,057	1968	San Antonio, Texas	
San Antonio Spurs Texas Chaparrals Dallas Chaparrals	Lubbock Municipal Coliseum; City Bank Coliseum (2007–2017)	1970–1971 (partial schedule)	11,200	1956	Lubbock, Texas	
San Antonio Spurs Texas Chaparrals Dallas Chaparrals	Tarrant County Convention Center	1970–1971 (partial schedule)	16,057	1968	Fort Worth, Texas	
San Antonio Spurs Texas Chaparrals Dallas Chaparrals	Moody Coliseum	1967–1973	8,998	1956	University Park, Texas	
San Antonio Spurs Texas Chaparrals Dallas Chaparrals	Dallas Memorial Auditorium; Kay Bailey Hutchison Convention Center (2013–present); Dallas Convention Center (1973–2013)	1967–1973	9,815	1957	Dallas, Texas	
Northwest Division
Team	Arena	Years used	Capacity	Opened	Location	Ref.
Denver Nuggets Denver Rockets
Denver Nuggets Denver Rockets	McNichols Sports Arena	1975–1999	17,171	1975	Denver, Colorado	
Denver Nuggets Denver Rockets	Denver Auditorium Arena	1967–1975	6,841	1908	Denver, Colorado	
Denver Nuggets Denver Rockets	Denver Coliseum	1967–1970 (partial schedule)	9,000	1950	Denver, Colorado	
Minnesota Timberwolves
Minnesota Timberwolves	Hubert H. Humphrey Metrodome	1989–1990	50,000	1982	Minneapolis, Minnesota	
Oklahoma City Thunder Seattle SuperSonics
Oklahoma City Thunder Seattle SuperSonics	KeyArena at Seattle Center; Climate Pledge Arena (2021–present); Seattle Center Coliseum (1962–1994)	1995–2008; 1985–1994; 1967–1978 (Note: Also hosted Game 4 of the 1979 NBA Finals against the Washington Bullets, three games of the 1980 Western Conference semifinals against the Milwaukee Bucks, and Game 3 of the 1984 Western Conference first round against the Dallas Mavericks, as a result of the Seattle Mariners occupying the Kingdome. The SuperSonics were forced to play the entire home schedule of the 1980 Western Conference finals against the Los Angeles Lakers at Hec Edmundson Pavilion as neither the Coliseum nor the Kingdome were available.)	17,072	1962	Seattle, Washington	
Oklahoma City Thunder Seattle SuperSonics	Tacoma Dome	1994–1995 (Note: Also hosted four games in the 1983–84 season, and three games in the 1990–91 season.)	17,100	1983	Tacoma, Washington	
Oklahoma City Thunder Seattle SuperSonics	Kingdome	1978–1985 (Note: Also hosted two games in the 1988–89 season, four games in the 1991–92 season, and four games in the 1992–93 season.)	59,166	1976	Seattle, Washington	
Portland Trail Blazers
Portland Trail Blazers	Memorial Coliseum; Veterans Memorial Coliseum (2011–present)	1970–1995	12,888	1960	Portland, Oregon	
Utah Jazz New Orleans Jazz
Utah Jazz New Orleans Jazz	Salt Palace	1979–1991	12,686	1969	Salt Lake City, Utah	
Utah Jazz New Orleans Jazz	Thomas & Mack Center	1983–1984 (partial schedule)	18,500	1983	Paradise, Nevada	
Utah Jazz New Orleans Jazz	Louisiana Superdome; Caesars Superdome (2021–present); Mercedes-Benz Superdome (2011–2021)	1975–1979	55,675	1975	New Orleans, Louisiana	
Utah Jazz New Orleans Jazz	Loyola Field House	1974–1975 (partial schedule)	6,500	1950	New Orleans, Louisiana	
Utah Jazz New Orleans Jazz	Municipal Auditorium	1974–1975	7,853	1934	New Orleans, Louisiana	
Pacific Division
Team	Arena	Years used	Capacity	Opened	Location	Ref.
Golden State Warriors San Francisco Warriors Philadelphia Warriors
Golden State Warriors San Francisco Warriors Philadelphia Warriors	Oracle Arena; Oakland Arena (2005–2006; 2019–present); The Arena in Oakland (1997–2005); Oakland-Alameda County Coliseum (1971–1996)	1971–1996; 1997–2019	19,596	1971	Oakland, California	
Golden State Warriors San Francisco Warriors Philadelphia Warriors	San Jose Arena; SAP Center at San Jose (2013–present); HP Pavilion at San Jose (2002–2013); Compaq Center at San Jose (2001–2002)	1996–1997	18,500	1993	San Jose, California	
Golden State Warriors San Francisco Warriors Philadelphia Warriors	USF War Memorial Gymnasium	1962–1965	5,300	1958	San Francisco, California	
Golden State Warriors San Francisco Warriors Philadelphia Warriors	San Francisco Civic Auditorium; Bill Graham Civic Auditorium	1968–1971; 1964–1967	7,000	1915	San Francisco, California	
Golden State Warriors San Francisco Warriors Philadelphia Warriors	Cow Palace	1966–1971; 1962–1964 (Note: Also hosted Games 2 and 3 of the 1975 NBA Finals against the Washington Bullets due to Oakland Arena hosting an Ice Follies event.)	12,953	1941	Daly City, California	
Golden State Warriors San Francisco Warriors Philadelphia Warriors	Municipal Auditorium	1952–1962	12,000	1930	Philadelphia, Pennsylvania	
Golden State Warriors San Francisco Warriors Philadelphia Warriors	Philadelphia Arena	1946–1962 (partial schedule 1952–1962)	7,000	1920	Philadelphia, Pennsylvania	
Los Angeles Clippers San Diego Clippers Buffalo Braves
Los Angeles Clippers San Diego Clippers Buffalo Braves	Crypto.com Arena; Staples Center (1999–2021)	1999–2024	19,067	1999	Los Angeles, California	
Los Angeles Clippers San Diego Clippers Buffalo Braves	Arrowhead Pond of Anaheim; Honda Center (2006–present); Pond of Anaheim (1993)	1994–1999 (partial schedule)	18,336	1993	Anaheim, California	
Los Angeles Clippers San Diego Clippers Buffalo Braves	Los Angeles Memorial Sports Arena	1984–1999	16,161	1959	Los Angeles, California	
Los Angeles Clippers San Diego Clippers Buffalo Braves	San Diego Sports Arena; Pechanga Arena (2018–present); Valley View Casino Center (2010–2018) iPayOne Center (2005–2007); San Diego International Sports Center (1966–1970)	1978–1984	14,500	1966	San Diego, California	
Los Angeles Clippers San Diego Clippers Buffalo Braves	Maple Leaf Gardens	1971–1975 (16 home games)	15,000	1931	Toronto, Ontario	
Los Angeles Clippers San Diego Clippers Buffalo Braves	Buffalo Memorial Auditorium	1970–1978	15,280	1940	Buffalo, New York	
Los Angeles Lakers Minneapolis Lakers
Los Angeles Lakers Minneapolis Lakers	The Forum; Kia Forum (2022–present); Great Western Forum (1988–2003)	1967–1999	17,505	1967	Inglewood, California	
Los Angeles Lakers Minneapolis Lakers	Long Beach Arena	1967 (when locked out of Sports Arena)	13,609	1962	Long Beach, California	
Los Angeles Lakers Minneapolis Lakers	Los Angeles Memorial Sports Arena	1960–1967	16,161	1959	Los Angeles, California	
Los Angeles Lakers Minneapolis Lakers	Minneapolis Armory	1959–1960; 1947–1959 (partial schedule)	10,000	1936	Minneapolis, Minnesota	
Los Angeles Lakers Minneapolis Lakers	Minneapolis Auditorium	1947–1959	10,000	1927	Minneapolis, Minnesota	
Phoenix Suns
Phoenix Suns	Arizona Veterans Memorial Coliseum	1968–1992	14,870	1965	Phoenix, Arizona	
Sacramento Kings Kansas City Kings Kansas City-Omaha Kings Cincinnati Royals Rochester Royals
Sacramento Kings Kansas City Kings Kansas City-Omaha Kings Cincinnati Royals Rochester Royals	Sleep Train Arena; Power Balance Pavilion (2011–2012); ARCO Arena (II) (1988–2011)	1988–2016	17,317	1988	Sacramento, California	
Sacramento Kings Kansas City Kings Kansas City-Omaha Kings Cincinnati Royals Rochester Royals	ARCO Arena (I); Sacramento Sports Arena (1985)	1985–1988	10,333	1985	Sacramento, California	
Sacramento Kings Kansas City Kings Kansas City-Omaha Kings Cincinnati Royals Rochester Royals	Kemper Arena; Hy-Vee Arena (2018–present); Mosaic Arena (2017)	1974–1985	16,700	1974	Kansas City, Missouri	
Sacramento Kings Kansas City Kings Kansas City-Omaha Kings Cincinnati Royals Rochester Royals	Omaha Civic Auditorium	1972–1978 (partial schedule)	9,300	1954	Omaha, Nebraska	
Sacramento Kings Kansas City Kings Kansas City-Omaha Kings Cincinnati Royals Rochester Royals	Municipal Auditorium	1972–1974	9,287	1936	Kansas City, Missouri	
Sacramento Kings Kansas City Kings Kansas City-Omaha Kings Cincinnati Royals Rochester Royals	Cincinnati Gardens	1957–1972	11,000	1949	Cincinnati, Ohio	
Sacramento Kings Kansas City Kings Kansas City-Omaha Kings Cincinnati Royals Rochester Royals	Rochester Community War Memorial; Blue Cross Arena at War Memorial (1998–present)	1955–1957	12,428	1955	Rochester, New York	
Sacramento Kings Kansas City Kings Kansas City-Omaha Kings Cincinnati Royals Rochester Royals	Edgerton Park Arena	1945–1955	4,200	1892	Rochester, New York	

== Defunct teams ==
Team	Arena	Years used	Capacity	Opened	Location	Ref.
Anderson Packers (1946–1950; 1949–1950 in NBA)	The Wigwam	1949–1950	8,996	1925	Anderson, Indiana	
Baltimore Bullets (1944–1954)	Baltimore Coliseum	1944–1954	4,500	1930	Baltimore, Maryland	
Chicago Stags (1946–1950)	Chicago Stadium	1946–1950	18,676	1929	Chicago, Illinois	
Cleveland Rebels (1946–1947)	Cleveland Arena	1946–1947	10,000	1937	Cleveland, Ohio	
Denver Nuggets (1948–1950)	Auditorium Arena	1948–1950	12,000	1908	Denver, Colorado	
Detroit Falcons (1946–1947)	Detroit Olympia	1946–1947	15,000	1927	Detroit, Michigan	
Indianapolis Jets Indianapolis Kautskys (1948–1949)	Hinkle Fieldhouse	1948–1949	15,000	1928	Indianapolis, Indiana	
Indianapolis Olympians (1949–1953)	Hinkle Fieldhouse	1949–1953	15,000	1928	Indianapolis, Indiana	
Pittsburgh Ironmen (1946–1947)	Duquesne Gardens	1946–1947	6,500	1890	Pittsburgh, Pennsylvania	
Providence Steamrollers (1946–1949)	Rhode Island Auditorium	1946–1949	5,300	1926	Providence, Rhode Island	
Sheboygan Redskins Enzo Jels (1938–1951)	Sheboygan Municipal Auditorium and Armory	1942–1951	3,500	1942	Sheboygan, Wisconsin	
Sheboygan Redskins Enzo Jels (1938–1951)	Eagle Auditorium	1938–1942	1,200	Unknown	Sheboygan, Wisconsin	
St. Louis Bombers (1946–1950)	St. Louis Arena; The Checkerdome (1977–1983)	1946–1950	15,000	1929	St. Louis, Missouri	
Toronto Huskies (1946–1947)	Maple Leaf Gardens	1946–1947	15,000	1931	Toronto, Ontario	
Washington Capitols (1946–1951)	Uline Arena; Washington Coliseum (1959–present)	1946–1951	7,000	1941	Washington, D.C.	
Waterloo Hawks (1948–1951)	The Hippodrome	1948–1951	5,155	1936	Waterloo, Iowa	

== Neutral venues ==
Neutral venues
Arena	Location	Date	Attendance	Reference
Duquesne Gardens	Pittsburgh, Pennsylvania	March 11, 1953		
Civic Arena	Pittsburgh, Pennsylvania	February 18, 1964; December 14, 1964; January 11, 1965; February 15, 1966; November 3, 1966; January 5, 1967; February 7, 1967; February 24, 1967; March 6, 1967; December 7, 1972; December 27, 1972; January 12, 1973; February 25, 1973; March 11, 1973; March 25, 1973		
Charleston Civic Center	Charleston, West Virginia	December 6, 1965; February 14, 1966		
Mid-South Coliseum	Memphis, Tennessee	December 19, 1966; December 26, 1966; January 2, 1967; January 23, 1967; January 30, 1967; February 6, 1967; February 13, 1967; March 6, 1967; March 13, 1967		
Curtis Hixon Hall	Tampa, Florida	January 16, 1967		
Greensboro Coliseum Complex	Greensboro, North Carolina	January 30, 1967	7,168	
St. Paul Auditorium	Saint Paul, Minnesota	February 7, 1967		
Tokyo Metropolitan Gymnasium	Tokyo, Japan	November 2, 1990; November 3, 1990		
Yokohama Arena	Yokohama, Japan	November 6, 1992; November 7, 1992; November 4, 1994; November 5, 1994		
Tokyo Dome	Tokyo, Japan	November 7, 1996; November 9, 1996; November 6, 1999; November 7, 1999		
Palacio de los Deportes	Mexico City, Mexico	December 7, 1997		
Saitama Super Arena	Saitama, Japan	October 30, 2003; November 1, 2003		
The O2 Arena	London, United Kingdom	March 4, 2011; March 5, 2011; January 17, 2013; January 16, 2014; January 15, 2015; January 14, 2016; January 12, 2017; January 11, 2018; January 17, 2019; January 18, 2026		
Bell Centre	Montreal, Quebec	October 19, 2012; October 20, 2013; October 24, 2014; October 23, 2015; October 10, 2018; October 14, 2022; October 12, 2023; October 6, 2024		
MTS Centre	Winnipeg, Manitoba	October 24, 2012; October 10, 2015		
Mexico City Arena	Mexico City, Mexico	November 12, 2014; December 3, 2015; January 12, 2017; January 14, 2017; December 7, 2017; December 9, 2017; December 13, 2018; December 15, 2018; December 12, 2019; December 14, 2019; November 9, 2023; November 2, 2024; November 1, 2025		
Canadian Tire Centre	Ottawa, Ontario	October 14, 2015		
Scotiabank Saddledome	Calgary, Alberta	October 3, 2016		
Accor Arena	Paris, France	January 24, 2020; January 19, 2023; January 11, 2024; January 23, 2025; January 25, 2025		
ESPN Wide World of Sports Complex (Note: The ESPN Wide World of Sports Complex served as the host of the NBA Bubble, when the 2019–20 season resumed.)	Bay Lake, Florida	July 30–October 11, 2020		
Rogers Place	Edmonton, Alberta	October 2, 2022		
T-Mobile Arena (Note: T-Mobile Arena hosted nine games as part of the NBA Cup from 2023 to 2025. While the two semifinal games counted towards regular season standings, the Final did not.)	Paradise, Nevada	December 7–9, 2023; December 14–17, 2024; December 13–16, 2025	17,427 (2023 average)	
Uber Arena	Berlin, Germany	January 15, 2026		

== See also ==
- List of indoor arenas in the United States
- List of basketball arenas
- List of American Basketball Association arenas
- List of NCAA Division I basketball arenas
- List of current Major League Baseball stadiums
- List of Major League Soccer stadiums
- List of current National Football League stadiums
- List of National Hockey League arenas
- List of U.S. stadiums by capacity
