= List of American Basketball Association arenas =

The following list includes all current and former arenas used by current and defunct teams who once played in the American Basketball Association from 1967 to 1976.

== ABA/NBA teams ==
Team	Arena	Years used	Capacity	Opened	City	Ref.
Brooklyn Nets New Jersey Nets New York Nets New Jersey Americans	Barclays Center	2012–present	18,103	2012	Brooklyn, New York	
Brooklyn Nets New Jersey Nets New York Nets New Jersey Americans	Prudential Center	2010–2012	18,711	2007	Newark, New Jersey	
Brooklyn Nets New Jersey Nets New York Nets New Jersey Americans	Izod Center (Note: Formerely known as Continental Airlines Arena (1996–2007) and Brendan Byrne Arena (1981–1996))	1981–2010	20,049	1981	East Rutherford, New Jersey	
Brooklyn Nets New Jersey Nets New York Nets New Jersey Americans	Rutgers Athletic Center	1977–1981	8,500	1977	Piscataway, New Jersey	
Brooklyn Nets New Jersey Nets New York Nets New Jersey Americans	Nassau Veterans Memorial Coliseum	1972–1977	14,890	1972	Uniondale, New York	
Brooklyn Nets New Jersey Nets New York Nets New Jersey Americans	Island Garden	1969–1972	5,200	1956	West Hempstead, New York	
Brooklyn Nets New Jersey Nets New York Nets New Jersey Americans	Long Island Arena (Note: Also referred to Commack Arena)	1968–1969	6,000	1957	Commack, New York	
Brooklyn Nets New Jersey Nets New York Nets New Jersey Americans	Teaneck Armory	1967–1968	5,500	1936	Teaneck, New Jersey	
Indiana Pacers	Gainbridge Fieldhouse (Note: referred to as Bankers Life Fieldhouse (2011–2021) and Conseco Fieldhouse (1999–2011))	1999–present	18,165 (formerly 18,345)	1999	Indianapolis, Indiana	
Indiana Pacers	Market Square Arena	1974–1999	16,530	1974	Indianapolis, Indiana	
Indiana Pacers	Corteva Coliseum (Note: Formerly known as Indiana Farmers Coliseum (2015–2024), Fairgrounds Coliseum (Apr–Dec 2014), Pepsi Coliseum (1991–2012), Indiana State Fairgrounds Coliseum (1939–1991))	1967–1974	10,000	1939	Indianapolis, Indiana	
San Antonio Spurs Texas Chaparrals Dallas Chaparrals	Frost Bank Center (Note: Known as SBC Center from 2002 to 2005 and AT&T Center from 2006 to 2023)	2002–present	18,581	2002	San Antonio, Texas	
San Antonio Spurs Texas Chaparrals Dallas Chaparrals	Alamodome	1993–2002	20,557	1993	San Antonio, Texas	
San Antonio Spurs Texas Chaparrals Dallas Chaparrals	HemisFair Arena	1973–1993	16,057	1968	San Antonio, Texas	
San Antonio Spurs Texas Chaparrals Dallas Chaparrals	Lubbock Municipal Coliseum (Note: Known as City Bank Coliseum since 2007)	1970–1971 (Partial schedule)	11,200	1956	Lubbock, Texas	
San Antonio Spurs Texas Chaparrals Dallas Chaparrals	Tarrant County Convention Center	1970–1971 (Partial schedule)	16,057	1968	Fort Worth, Texas	
San Antonio Spurs Texas Chaparrals Dallas Chaparrals	Moody Coliseum	1967–1973	8,998	1956	University Park, Texas	
San Antonio Spurs Texas Chaparrals Dallas Chaparrals	Dallas Memorial Auditorium (Note: Known now as Kay Bailey Hutchison Convention Center' after being named the Dallas Convention Center)	1967–1973	9,815	1957	Dallas, Texas	
Denver Nuggets Denver Rockets	Ball Arena (Note: known as Pepsi Center from 1999–2020)	1999–present	19,155	1999	Denver, Colorado	
Denver Nuggets Denver Rockets	McNichols Sports Arena	1975–1999	17,171	1975	Denver, Colorado	
Denver Nuggets Denver Rockets	Denver Arena Auditorium	1967–1975	6,841	1908	Denver, Colorado	
Denver Nuggets Denver Rockets	Denver Coliseum	1967–1970 (partial schedule)	9,000	1950	Denver, Colorado	

== Defunct teams ==
Team	Arena	Years used	Capacity	Opened	City	Ref.
The Floridians Miami Floridians Minnesota Muskies
The Floridians Miami Floridians Minnesota Muskies	Bayfront Center	1971–1972	7,500	1965	St. Petersburg, Florida	
The Floridians Miami Floridians Minnesota Muskies	Curtis Hixon Hall	1970–1972 (partial schedule)	7,000	1965	Tampa, Florida	
The Floridians Miami Floridians Minnesota Muskies	Jacksonville Coliseum	1970–1972 (partial schedule)	11,000	1960	Jacksonville, Florida	
The Floridians Miami Floridians Minnesota Muskies	West Palm Beach Auditorium	1968–1969; 1970–1971 (partial schedule)	5,000	1965	West Palm Beach, Florida	
The Floridians Miami Floridians Minnesota Muskies	Miami Beach Convention Center	1968–1972	15,000	1957	Miami Beach, Florida	
The Floridians Miami Floridians Minnesota Muskies	Dinner Key Auditorium	1969–1970	6,900	1951	Miami, Florida	
The Floridians Miami Floridians Minnesota Muskies	Metropolitan Sports Center	1967–1968	15,000	1967	Bloomington, Minnesota	
Kentucky Colonels
Kentucky Colonels	Freedom Hall	1970–1976	18,865	1956	Louisville, Kentucky	
Kentucky Colonels	Louisville Convention Center (Note: Known as Jefferson County Armory (1905–1960), now known as Louisville Gardens since 1975)	1967–1970	6,000	1905	Louisville, Kentucky	
Kentucky Colonels	Memorial Coliseum	1973–1975 (ten home games)	6,250	1950	Lexington, Kentucky	
Kentucky Colonels	E.A. Diddle Arena	1973, 1974 (one game each)	13,508	1963	Bowling Green, Kentucky	
Kentucky Colonels	Riverfront Coliseum	1975–1976 (eight home games)	17,000	1975	Cincinnati, Ohio	
Kentucky Colonels	Armory Fieldhouse	1973–1974 (ten home games)	8,000	1954	Cincinnati, Ohio	
Memphis Sounds Memphis Tams Memphis Pros New Orleans Buccaneers
Memphis Sounds Memphis Tams Memphis Pros New Orleans Buccaneers	Mid-South Coliseum	1970–1975	10,085	1963	Memphis, Tennessee	
Memphis Sounds Memphis Tams Memphis Pros New Orleans Buccaneers	Monroe Civic Center	1967–1970 (partial schedule)	7,600	1965	Monroe, Louisiana	
Memphis Sounds Memphis Tams Memphis Pros New Orleans Buccaneers	Tulane Gym (Note: Now known as Fogelman Arena (1988–present))	1969–1970	3,600	1932	New Orleans, Louisiana	
Memphis Sounds Memphis Tams Memphis Pros New Orleans Buccaneers	Loyola Field House	1967–1969	6,500	1950	New Orleans, Louisiana	
Pittsburgh Condors Pittsburgh Pipers Minnesota Pipers Pittsburgh Pipers
Pittsburgh Condors Pittsburgh Pipers Minnesota Pipers Pittsburgh Pipers	Civic Arena	1967–1968; 1969–1972	17,537	1961	Pittsburgh, Pennsylvania	
Pittsburgh Condors Pittsburgh Pipers Minnesota Pipers Pittsburgh Pipers	Duluth Arena Auditorium	1968–1969 (8 home games)	6,764	1966	Duluth, Minnesota	
Pittsburgh Condors Pittsburgh Pipers Minnesota Pipers Pittsburgh Pipers	Metropolitan Sports Center	1968–1969	15,000	1967	Bloomington, Minnesota	
San Diego Sails San Diego Conquistadors
San Diego Sails San Diego Conquistadors	San Diego Sports Arena (Note: Known now as Valley View Casino Center (2010–present), formerly referred to as iPayOne Center (2005–2007))	1974–1976	14,500	1966	San Diego, California	
San Diego Sails San Diego Conquistadors	Peterson Gym	1972–1974	3,668	1961	San Diego, California	
Spirits of St. Louis Carolina Cougars Houston Mavericks
Spirits of St. Louis Carolina Cougars Houston Mavericks	St. Louis Arena	1974–1976	20,000	1929	St. Louis, Missouri	
Spirits of St. Louis Carolina Cougars Houston Mavericks	Greensboro Coliseum	1969–1974 (Partial schedule)	15,000	1959	Greensboro, North Carolina	
Spirits of St. Louis Carolina Cougars Houston Mavericks	Charlotte Coliseum (Note: Known as Bojangles' Coliseum since 2008 after formerly known as Cricket Arena (2001–2008) and Independence Arena (1988–2001))	1969–1974 (Partial schedule)	9,605	1955	Charlotte, North Carolina	
Spirits of St. Louis Carolina Cougars Houston Mavericks	Reynolds Coliseum	1969–1974 (Partial schedule)	12,400	1949	Raleigh, North Carolina	
Spirits of St. Louis Carolina Cougars Houston Mavericks	Dorton Arena	1969–1974 (Partial schedule)	7,610	1952	Raleigh, North Carolina	
Spirits of St. Louis Carolina Cougars Houston Mavericks	Winston–Salem Memorial Coliseum	1971–1972 (partial schedule)	7,000	1955	Winston-Salem, North Carolina	
Spirits of St. Louis Carolina Cougars Houston Mavericks	Sam Houston Coliseum	1967–1969	9,200	1937	Houston, Texas	
Utah Stars Los Angeles Stars Anaheim Amigos
Utah Stars Los Angeles Stars Anaheim Amigos	Salt Palace	1970–1975	10,725	1969	Salt Lake City, Utah	
Utah Stars Los Angeles Stars Anaheim Amigos	Smith Spectrum	1971 (two games)	10,270	1970	Logan, Utah	
Utah Stars Los Angeles Stars Anaheim Amigos	Swenson Gym	1970 (one game)	5,000	1962	Ogden, Utah	
Utah Stars Los Angeles Stars Anaheim Amigos	Los Angeles Memorial Sports Arena	1968–1970	16,161	1959	Los Angeles, California	
Utah Stars Los Angeles Stars Anaheim Amigos	Anaheim Convention Center	1967–1968	9,100	1967	Anaheim, California	
Utah Stars Los Angeles Stars Anaheim Amigos	Titan Gym	1967–1968 (4 home games)	4,000	1964	Fullerton, California	
Utah Stars Los Angeles Stars Anaheim Amigos	Selland Arena	1967, 1970 (2 home games each)	10,220	1966	Fresno, California	
Virginia Squires Washington Caps Oakland Oaks	Norfolk Scope	1971–1976 (partial schedule)	10,253	1971	Norfolk, Virginia	
Virginia Squires Washington Caps Oakland Oaks	Richmond Coliseum	1971–1976 (partial schedule)	12,500	1971	Richmond, Virginia	
Virginia Squires Washington Caps Oakland Oaks	Roanoke Civic Center	1971–1972 (partial schedule)	9,828	1971	Roanoke, Virginia	
Virginia Squires Washington Caps Oakland Oaks	Hampton Coliseum	1970–1976 (partial schedule)	9,777	1970	Hampton, Virginia	
Virginia Squires Washington Caps Oakland Oaks	Old Dominion University Fieldhouse	1970–1971 (partial schedule)	5,200	1970	Norfolk, Virginia	
Virginia Squires Washington Caps Oakland Oaks	Richmond Arena	1970–1971 (partial schedule)	6,000	1908	Richmond, Virginia	
Virginia Squires Washington Caps Oakland Oaks	Washington Coliseum	1969–1970	7,000	1941	Washington, D.C.	
Virginia Squires Washington Caps Oakland Oaks	Oakland–Alameda County Coliseum Arena (Note: Known as Oracle Arena (2007–present), formerly known as Oakland Arena (2005–2006), The Arena in Oakland (1997–2004))	1967–1969	19,596	1966	Oakland, California	

== Neutral games and oddities ==
In the history of the ABA, various games were played in various scenarios: "neutral sites" or games played as part of a doubleheader. Whether due to booking problems or in attempts to grow the game in the state an ABA team played in, games would even be played at high school and college gymnasiums on occasion (as is the case with the Indiana Pacers).

Arena	City	Games played	Ref.
Community Arena	Steubenville, Ohio	March 18, 1968 (Pittsburgh vs. Anaheim); December 27, 1969 (Pittsburgh Pipers vs. Los Angeles Stars)	
Civic Auditorium	San Jose, California	October 20, 1967 (Indiana vs. Oakland); October 27, 1967 (Denver vs. Oakland); March 14, 1969 (Minnesota vs. Oakland)	
Long Beach Arena	Long Beach, California	April 26, 1970 (Dallas Chaparrals vs. Los Angeles Stars)	
Memorial Coliseum	Portland, Oregon	January 8, 1968 (Oakland vs. New Jersey); February 7, 1968 (Oakland v. New Orleans)	
American River College	Sacramento, California	December 17, 1967 (Oakland vs. New Orleans)	
Richmond Memorial Auditorium	Richmond, California	December 19, 1967 (Oakland vs. Pacers); January 2, 1968 (Oakland vs. Anaheim)	
Mississippi Coliseum	Jackson, Mississippi	December 20, 1967 (Minnesota Muskies vs. New Orleans); December 18, 1968 (New Orleans vs. New York Nets); January 15, 1969 (New Orleans vs. Denver); February 19, 1969 (New Orleans vs. Houston Mavericks); March 17, 1969 (New Orleans vs Los Angeles); December 8, 1970 (Memphis Pros vs. Utah Stars); December 27, 1970 (Memphis Pros vs. Pacers); December 30, 1970 (Memphis Pros vs. Texas Chaparrals)	
Jackson Coliseum	Jackson, Tennessee	December 19, 1970 (Memphis Pros vs. Utah Stars); November 20, 1971 (Memphis Pros vs. Pittsburgh Condors); December 3, 1971 (Memphis Pros vs. Utah Stars)	
Dayton Fieldhouse	Dayton, Ohio	February 15, 1968 (Minnesota Muskies vs. Indiana Pacers)	
Maple Leaf Gardens	Toronto, Canada	January 14, 1972 (Memphis vs. Pacers); January 14, 1972 (Chaparrals vs. Colonels)	
Allen County War Memorial Coliseum	Fort Wayne, Indiana	March 4, 1968 (New Orleans vs. Pacers); March 24, 1972 (Denver vs. Pacers); January 12, 1973 (Pacers vs. Denver); February 26, 1973 (Pacers vs. Nets); February 24, 1974 (Pacers vs. Squires)	
Shelbyville High School	Shelbyville, Indiana	January 31, 1968 (Pittsburgh Pipers vs. Indiana Pacers)	
Chrysler High School	New Castle, Indiana	December 13, 1967 (Minnesota Muskies vs. Indiana Pacers)	
Madison High School	Madison, Indiana	February 19, 1968 (Kentucky Colonels vs. Indiana Pacers)	
Memorial Gym	Kokomo, Indiana	December 5, 1967 (New Jersey vs. Pacers); February 8, 1968 (Denver vs. Pacers)	
Anderson High School Wigwam	Anderson, Indiana	April 20, 1969 (Indiana Pacers vs. Miami Floridians); April 22, 1969 (Miami Floridians vs. Indiana Pacers); November 8, 1969 (Denver vs. Indiana); February 7, 1970 (Miami vs. Indiana); March 15, 1970 (Carolina vs. Indiana); March 17, 1971 (Dallas vs. Indiana); April 19, 1971 (Utah Stars vs. Indiana Pacers); April 22, 1972 (Utah Stars vs. Indiana Pacers)	
Assembly Hall	Bloomington, Indiana	April 22, 1972 (Utah Stars vs. Indiana Pacers); April 26, 1972 (Utah Stars vs. Indiana Pacers); May 6, 1972 (New York Nets vs. Indiana Pacers)	
Moby Gymnasium	Fort Collins, Colorado	November 18, 1970 (Denver vs. Indiana); March 27, 1971 (Texas Chaparrals vs. Denver)	
Madison Square Garden IV	New York City, New York	December 9, 1970 (Pacers vs. Nets); December 9, 1970 (Squires vs. Rockets); March 17, 1971 (Colonels, vs Nets); December 23, 1971 (Condors vs. Nets); December 23, 1971 (The Floridians vs. Carolina Cougars)	
Hofstra Physical Fitness Center	Hempstead, New York	April 6, 1971 (Virginia Squires vs. New York Nets); April 7, 1971 (Virginia Squires vs. New York Nets)	
Felt Forum	New York City, New York	April 10, 1971 (Virginia Squires vs. New York Nets)	
Fair Park	Birmingham, Alabama	March 24, 1972 (Colonels vs. Condors); February 10, 1973 (Chaparrals vs. Pacers)	
Hulman Center	Terre Haute, Indiana	February 16, 1974 (Pacers vs. Denver); March 2, 1975 (Spirits of St. Louis vs. Pacers); March 19, 1975 (Nets vs. Pacers); November 18, 1975 (Pacers vs. Colonels)	
Levitt Arena	Wichita, Kansas	February 2, 1970 (Denver vs. Los Angeles Stars)	
Blackham Coliseum	Lafayette, Louisiana	February 7, 1969 (New Orleans vs. Dallas); February 28, 1970 (New Orleans vs. Los Angeles Stars)	
Uniontown Area High School	Uniontown, Pennsylvania	February 9, 1972 (Utah Stars vs. Pittsburgh Condors)	
California State College	California, Pennsylvania	February 28, 1970 (Pipers vs. Dallas Chaparrals)	
Men's Gymnasium	Denton, Texas	February 3, 1973 (Utah Stars vs. Dallas Chaparrals); March 3, 1973 (Dallas Chaparrals vs. Denver Rockets); March 10, 1973 (San Diego Conquistadors vs. Dallas Chaparrals)	
Tucson Community Center	Tucson, Arizona	March 28, 1972 (Colonels vs. Condors)	
William C. Lee Field House	Fort Bragg, North Carolina	February 15, 1972 (Condors vs. Cougars)	
Jaffa Shrine Center	Altoona, Pennsylvania	February 13, 1968 (New Jersey vs Pipers); January 10, 1970 (Nets vs. Pipers)	
Reid Gym	Cullowhee, North Carolina	February 16, 1970 (New York Nets vs. Washington Caps)	
St. Paul Auditorium	Saint Paul, Minnesota	March 25, 1969 (Nets vs. Minnesota Pipers); February 16, 1973 (Memphis Tams vs. Denver Rockets)	
University Arena	Albuquerque, New Mexico	February 3, 1970 (Washington Caps vs Denver)	
Myriad Convention Center	Oklahoma City, Oklahoma	November 8, 1972 (Memphis Tams vs. Dallas Chaparrals)	
Mabee Center	Tulsa, Oklahoma	November 4, 1972 (New York Nets vs. Dallas Chaparrals)	
Sikeston Fieldhouse	Sikeston, Missouri	November 3, 1970 (Texas Chaparrals vs. Memphis Pros); January 25, 1971 (Memphis Pros vs. Carolina Cougars)	
Salem Civic Center	Salem, Virginia	March 27, 1971 (Virginia Squires vs. Carolina Cougars)	
Salt Palace	Salt Lake City, Utah	March 19, 1976 (San Antonio Spurs vs. Spirits of St. Louis)	
Bayfront Arena	St. Petersburg, Florida	November 10, 1971 (The Floridians vs. Virginia Squires)	
Miami-Dade Junior College North	Miami, Florida	April 6, 1971 (Kentucky Colonels vs. The Floridians); April 8, 1971 (Kentucky Colonels vs. The Floridians); April 12, 1971 (Kentucky Colonels vs. The Floridians); February 24, 1972 (Denver Rockets vs. The Floridians); February 6, 1972 (Pittsburgh Condors vs. The Floridians); January 15, 1972 (Dallas Chaparrals vs. The Floridians); April 4, 1972 (Virginia Squires vs. The Floridians); April 6, 1972 (Virginia Squires vs. The Floridians)	
