= Long Island Ducks (basketball) =

American basketball team based in Commack, New York

The Long Island Ducks were an American basketball team based in Commack, New York. They were a member of the Eastern Basketball Association for the 1977–1978 season and played their home games at the Long Island Arena. The owner of the team was Al Baron, who had previously owned the Long Island Ducks minor league hockey team. The head coach was Frank Mulzoff.

The Ducks finished their only season with 15 wins and 15 losses, in 2nd place in the EBA's Eastern Division. They lost to the Lancaster Red Roses in the first round of the playoffs in April 1978.

== Year-by-year ==
Year	League	Reg. season	Playoffs
1977/78	EBA	2nd	Semifinals
