= Long Island Ducks (ice hockey) =

Defunct ice hockey team in New York state

- City: Commack, New York
- League: Eastern Hockey League
- Division: North Division
- Operated: 1959–1973
- Home arena: Long Island Arena
- Colors: Red, Black, and White

Franchise history
- 1959–1961: New York Rovers
- 1961–1973: Long Island Ducks

Championships
- Playoff championships: 1965

The Long Island Ducks were a minor league hockey team in the Eastern Hockey League owned by Al and Renee Baron that played their home games at the Long Island Arena (usually referred to as Commack Arena). The team played from 1959 until 1973, when the Eastern League folded.

In 1961, the President of the franchise, William H. Linck, held a contest among fans to name the team. The winner was the first entry received, from George Resch of Cambria Heights, Queens, who named the team "Ducks". Aside from naming rights, Resch received two season tickets for winning the contest.

The Ducks are most famously known for player-head coach John Brophy, who is believed to be the role model for Paul Newman's character of Reggie Dunlop in the movie Slap Shot. Brophy encouraged and epitomized "old-time hockey" and brash physical play, retired as the league's career leader in penalty minutes, and was once suspended for half of a season for knocking down a referee. Brophy was quoted as saying, "Once you're a Duck, you're a Duck for the rest of your life," as Ducks General Manager John Muckler traded Brophy six times and got him back seven times.

The Ducks won the Eastern Hockey League North Division in 1964–65 and 1965–66. They were the Eastern Hockey League playoff champions and won the Walker Cup Trophy on April 7, 1965.

The New York Islanders of the National Hockey League, who began play in 1972–73, had originally been widely expected to adopt the Long Island Ducks name. The name was later taken by the Long Island Ducks, an independent baseball team in Central Islip, which began play in 2000.

== Long Island Arena ==
The Ducks' arena in Commack was also made infamous for several events that took place during the tenure of the Ducks:

- Because of the poorly-run heating inside the small arena, fans often attended games freezing. During one game, fans affected by the cold temperatures lit a bonfire in the arena, prompting Al Baron to joke, "Tonight's game is brought to you by the Smithtown Fire Department".
- One night the Ducks' plane was delayed and a game did not begin until 11:30 pm. The game did not end until 2:30 am, with 2,500 fans still in attendance.
- Chicken wire originally separated the players from the fans above the dasher boards. It was eventually replaced with glass, which was taken from the old Madison Square Garden after it closed in 1968. One night, a player jumped over the boards and punched a fan, which prompted owner Al Baron to say, "This is the only rink in organized hockey where the players stand on the ice and watch the fights in the stands."
- The Ducks' bus from Johnstown arrived four hours late before one game against New Haven, so they put on unwashed uniforms and began the game with a large brawl.
- The visitor's locker room was located just 20 feet away from the main entrance to the arena, so many opposing players got into fights with the fans when entering and leaving the building.
- The opening face-off of one game was delayed by 20 minutes because there were no pucks, which were later found in an ice cream freezer.
