= Brooklyn Nets =

National Basketball Association team in New York City

- 2026–27 Brooklyn Nets season
- Conference: Eastern
- Division: Atlantic
- Founded: 1967
- History: New Jersey Americans; 1967–1968 (ABA); New York Nets; 1968–1976 (ABA); 1976–1977 (NBA); New Jersey Nets; 1977–2012; Brooklyn Nets; 2012–present
- Arena: Barclays Center
- Location: Brooklyn, New York
- Team colors: Black, white, gray
- Main sponsor: All in Won
- CEO: Sam Zussman
- General manager: Sean Marks
- Head coach: Jordi Fernández
- Ownership: Joseph Tsai
- Affiliation: Long Island Nets
- Championships: 2 ABA: 2 (1974, 1976); NBA: 0
- Conference titles: 2 (2002, 2003)
- Division titles: 5 ABA: 1 (1974); NBA: 4 (2002, 2003, 2004, 2006)
- Retired numbers: 7 (3, 5, 15, 23, 25, 32, 52)
- Website: nba.com/nets
| Association | Icon | Statement |
City

The Brooklyn Nets are an American professional basketball team based in the New York City borough of Brooklyn. The Nets compete in the National Basketball Association (NBA) as a member of the Atlantic Division of the Eastern Conference. The team plays its home games at Barclays Center. They are one of two NBA teams located in New York City, the other being the New York Knicks.

The club was established in 1967 as a charter franchise of the NBA's rival league, the American Basketball Association (ABA). They played in New Jersey as the New Jersey Americans during their first season, before moving to Long Island, New York, in 1968 and changing their name to the New York Nets. During this time, the Nets won two ABA championships (1974 and 1976), led by Hall of Famer Julius Erving. In 1976, the ABA merged with the NBA and four ABA teams were absorbed (Nets, Denver Nuggets, Indiana Pacers, and San Antonio Spurs), all of whom remain in the league to this day.

In 1977, the team returned to New Jersey and played as the New Jersey Nets from 1977 to 2012. Led by star point guard Jason Kidd, the Nets reached consecutive NBA Finals in 2002 and 2003, but failed to win a championship. In the summer of 2012, the team moved to Barclays Center in Brooklyn, becoming the first major sports franchise in the borough since the departure of the Brooklyn Dodgers baseball team in 1957. Since moving to Brooklyn, the Nets have qualified for the playoffs on eight occasions, including trips to the conference semifinals in 2014 and 2021.

== History ==
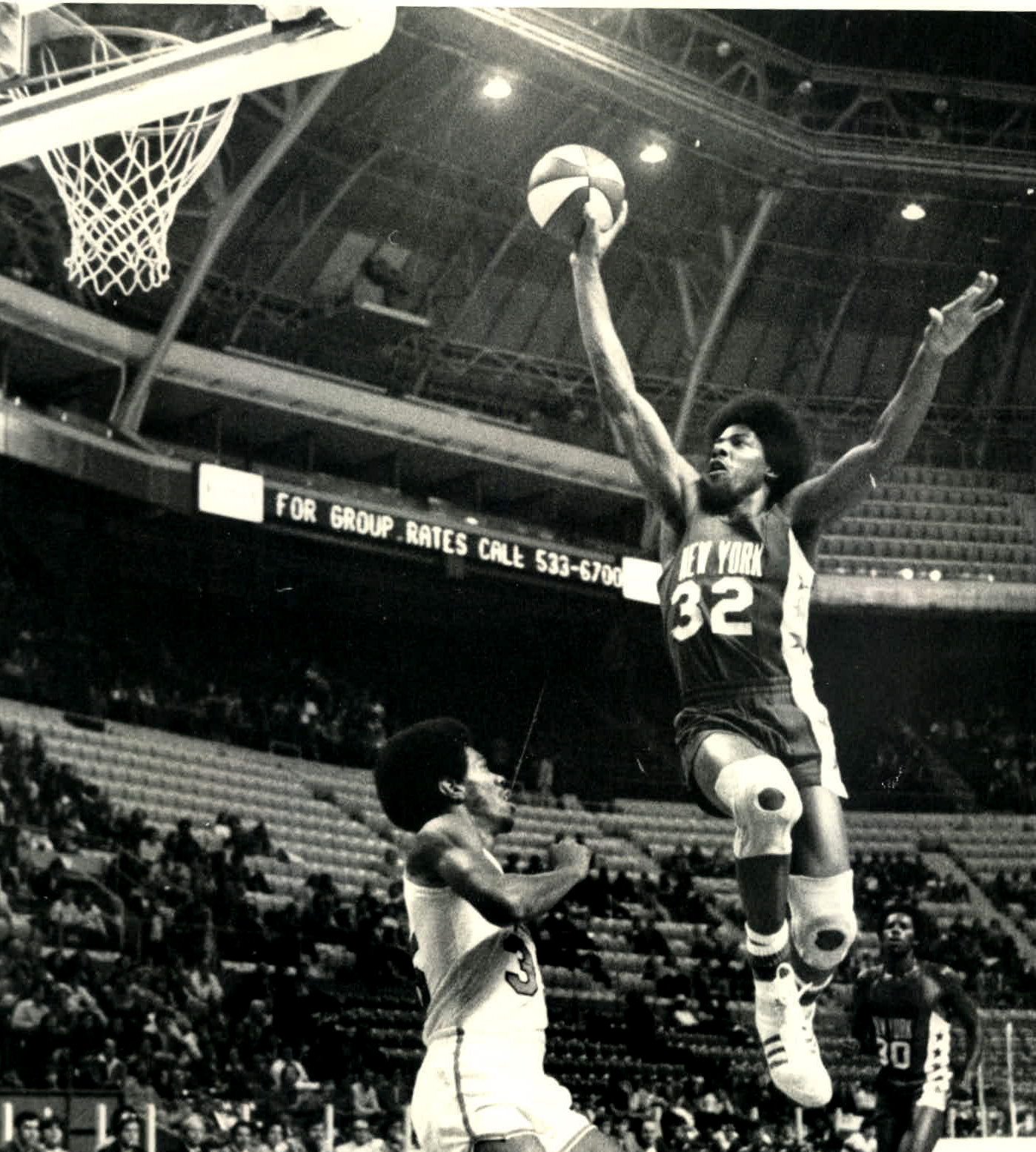
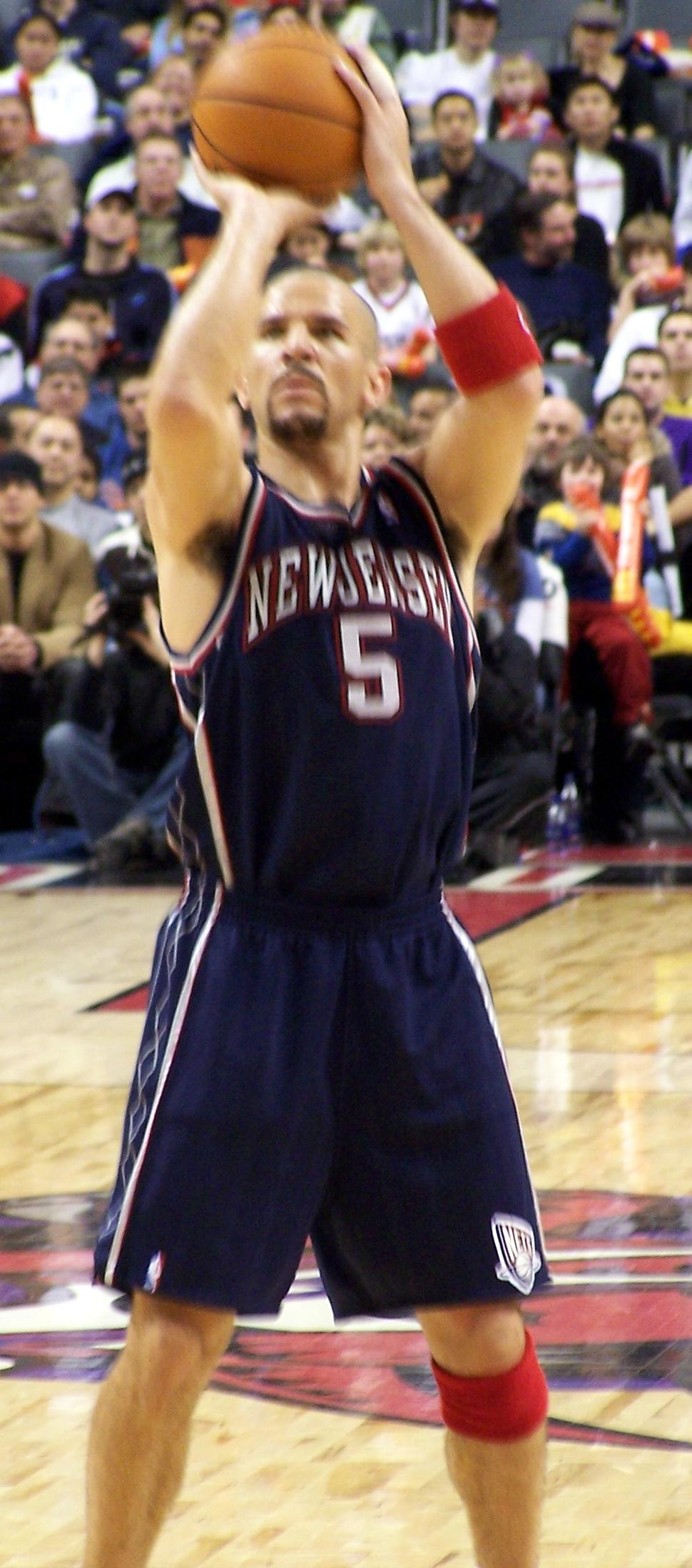
Julius Erving (left) and Jason Kidd (right), are two of the most influential players in Nets history, representing the ABA championship era and early-2000s teams

The Nets were founded in 1967 and initially played in Teaneck, New Jersey, as the New Jersey Americans. In its early years, the team led a nomadic existence, moving to Long Island in 1968 and playing in various arenas there as the New York Nets.

Led by Hall of Famer Julius Erving, the Nets won two ABA championships in New York before becoming one of four ABA teams to be admitted into the NBA as part of the ABA–NBA merger in 1976. Unlike the other three ABA teams entering the NBA, who played in cities without any NBA presence, the Nets were required to pay an "invasion fee" of $4.8 million (equivalent to $27 million in 2025) to the New York Knicks. The team was forced to finance that payment by selling Erving's contract to the Philadelphia 76ers; and the Nets went from winning the last ABA title in 1975–76 to having the worst record in the NBA in 1976–77. The team then moved back to New Jersey in 1977 and became the New Jersey Nets.

During their time in the state, the Nets played in two consecutive NBA Finals in the 2001–02 and 2002–03 seasons, led by All-NBA point guard Jason Kidd, whose arrival helped transform the team into a perennial playoff contender. The later acquisition of Vince Carter further strengthened the core that kept the Nets competitive in the Eastern Conference through the mid-2000s. After playing 35 seasons in New Jersey, the team moved back to the state of New York, changed its geographic name to Brooklyn, and began playing in the new Barclays Center, starting with the 2012–13 NBA season. The team's move from New Jersey to Brooklyn was approved unanimously by the NBA Board of Governors on April 13, 2012. Since the move, the team has struggled to achieve consistent success despite roster overhauls that brought Kevin Garnett and Paul Pierce and, later, Kevin Durant and Kyrie Irving.

== Rivalries ==
=== Boston Celtics ===
During the early 2000s, the Nets were led by Jason Kidd and Kenyon Martin, while the Boston Celtics were experiencing new success behind Paul Pierce and Antoine Walker. The rivalry began to heat up in the conference finals of the 2002 playoffs, which was preceded by trash-talking from the Celtics, who claimed Martin was a "fake" tough guy. Things progressed as the series started, and on-court tensions seemed to spill into the stands. Celtic fans berated Kidd and his family with chants of "Wife Beater!" alluding to Kidd's 2001 domestic-abuse charge. When the series returned to New Jersey, Nets fans responded, with some brandishing signs that read "Will someone please stab Paul Pierce?" referring to a nightclub incident in 2000 in which Pierce was stabbed 11 times. When asked about the fan barbs, Kenyon Martin stated, "Our fans hate them, their fans hate us." Bill Walton said the tension was the "beginning of the next great NBA rivalry" during the conference finals. Led by Kidd, the Nets advanced to the NBA Finals, and the following year, swept Boston in the 2003 playoffs.

On November 28, 2012, there were indications that the rivalry might be rekindled when an altercation occurred on the court, resulting in the ejection of Rajon Rondo, Gerald Wallace, and Kris Humphries. Rondo was suspended for two games, while Wallace and Kevin Garnett were fined. On December 25, Wallace grabbed Garnett's shorts and the two had to be broken up by referees and players.

In the 2019 NBA off-season, the Nets signed point guard Kyrie Irving, whose two seasons with the Celtics had seen critics call him selfish and fans blame him for not making the playoffs.

During a regular-season game in the 2019–20 season between the Celtics and Nets, the Celtics' fans chanted "Kyrie sucks" in TD Garden. When the series returned to Brooklyn two days later, the Nets' fans chanted "Kyrie's better", alluding to the Celtics' recent signing of Kemba Walker.

On May 30, 2021, after Irving stomped on the Celtics center-court logo, a fan threw a water bottle at Irving at TD Garden after a Nets victory and a 3–1 lead in the series.

=== New York Knicks ===
The Knicks–Nets rivalry has historically been a geographical one, with the Knicks playing in Madison Square Garden in the New York City borough of Manhattan, while the Nets played in the suburban area of Long Island and in New Jersey, and since 2012 have been playing at Barclays Center in Brooklyn. Media outlets have noted the Knicks–Nets rivalry's similarity to those of other New York City teams, such as the Major League Baseball (MLB) historical Subway Series rivalry and the current rivalry between the American League (AL)'s New York Yankees and the National League (NL)'s New York Mets, and the National Football League (NFL) rivalry between the National Football Conference (NFC)'s New York Giants and the American Football Conference (AFC)'s New York Jets, the result of the boroughs' proximity through the New York City Subway. Historically, the boroughs of Manhattan and Brooklyn competed via the Dodgers–Giants rivalry, when the two teams were the Brooklyn Dodgers and the New York Giants. Like the Knicks and Nets, the Giants and Dodgers played in Manhattan and Brooklyn, respectively, and were fierce intraleague rivals. The rivalry between the New York Islanders and New York Rangers of the National Hockey League (NHL) took on a similar dimension while the Islanders inhabited the Barclays Center, from 2015 to 2021. Due to the Knicks being located in Manhattan and the Nets being located in Brooklyn, some media outlets have dubbed this rivalry "Clash of the Boroughs".

=== Toronto Raptors ===
The rivalry with the Toronto Raptors began in the 2000s, specifically in 2004, after Raptors guard/forward Vince Carter was traded to the New Jersey Nets. However, the two teams did not meet in the playoffs until 2007, when the Nets defeated the Raptors in the first round series, 4 games to 2, after a go-ahead shot by Richard Jefferson with 8 seconds left in Game 6 led to a 98–97 victory. In 2014, the teams met again in the first round, and the series went to seven games, with a game-winning block by Paul Pierce, giving the Nets the 104–103 victory. The series was noted for controversy when Toronto Raptors general manager Masai Ujiri made derogatory remarks towards Brooklyn at a fan rally outside Maple Leaf Square in Toronto before Game 1. Ujiri later apologized at halftime. The Raptors and Nets faced each other in the 2020 NBA playoffs in the first round, with Toronto winning the series four games to none.

== Season-by-season record ==
List of the last five seasons completed by the Nets. For the full season-by-season history, see List of Brooklyn Nets seasons.

Note: GP = Games played, W = Wins, L = Losses, W–L% = Winning percentage

| Season | GP | W | L | W–L% | Finish | Playoffs |
| 2021–22 | 82 | 44 | 38 | .537 | 4th, Atlantic | Lost in first round, 0–4 (Celtics) |
| 2022–23 | 82 | 45 | 37 | .549 | 4th, Atlantic | Lost in first round, 0–4 (76ers) |
| 2023–24 | 82 | 32 | 50 | .390 | 4th, Atlantic | Did not qualify |
| 2024–25 | 82 | 26 | 56 | .317 | 4th, Atlantic | Did not qualify |
| 2025–26 | 82 | 20 | 62 | .244 | 5th, Atlantic | Did not qualify |

== Uniforms ==
=== New Jersey Americans ===
Upon debuting in the ABA in 1967, the New Jersey Americans wore white and red uniforms. The white uniforms contained red, blue and white stripes, with the team name and numerals in red with blue trim. The red uniforms mirror the striping configurations of the white uniforms while the city name and numerals were in blue with white trim.

=== New York Nets ===
==== 1968–1972 ====
Moving to Long Island as the New York Nets, they kept the original Americans template except for the location and team name. The white uniforms featured a script "Nets" lettering with a tail accent below, while the red uniforms featured "New York" in block letters (similar to the New York Knicks). Over the years, the letters and stripes would endure a few adjustments.

==== 1972–1977 ====
The Nets changed uniforms upon moving to Nassau Coliseum. The white uniforms featured a thick blue stripe with white stars on the left, along with a red stripe and white outline. The team name is written in red block letters. The blue uniforms, which featured "New York" in white block letters, mirrored that of the white uniforms.

=== New Jersey Nets ===
==== 1977–1981; 1983–1990 ====
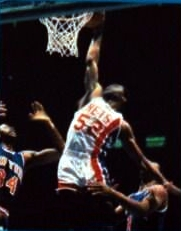
Buck Williams in the "Stars and Stripes" white uniform in the 1980s

The Nets carried the "Stars and Stripes" uniform to New Jersey in 1977. The white uniform remained the same but the blue uniform read "Nets" in front. The blue uniform later added "New Jersey" in white block letters inside the red stripe.

==== 1981–1983 ====
Upon moving to the Meadowlands in 1981, the Nets briefly changed their uniform set. The white uniform brought back the "Nets" script from the original New York Nets uniforms, but the color scheme became blue with red trim. The blue uniform featured "New Jersey" stacked together in a similar script style, and the letters were colored in red with white trim.

==== 1990–1997 ====
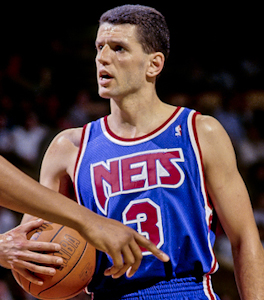
Dražen Petrović in the 1990 rebranded blue uniforms

The Nets underwent a visual rebrand before the 1990–91 season. The white uniform featured a more futuristic "Nets" script in red with white and blue trim, while adding red and blue stripes. Initially, the Nets wore white and light blue gradient road uniforms that had a tie-dye effect, but switched to a solid blue uniform after only one season. Both blue uniforms featured the same "Nets" script in red with blue and white trim along with red and white stripes.

==== 1997–2012 ====
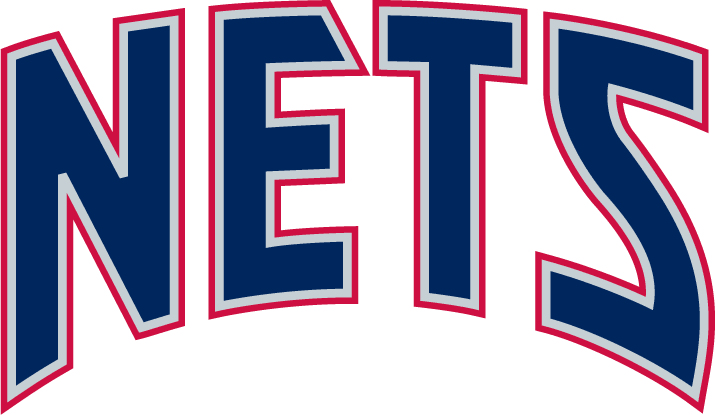
Wordmark logo used on New Jersey Nets home uniforms from 1997 to 2012

The Nets updated their visual identity prior to the 1997–98 season, going with a deeper red and navy scheme with silver accents. The white uniform, which remained virtually unchanged throughout its history, featured the team name in navy with silver and red trim. The navy uniform featured the city name in silver with navy and red trim. The dark grey alternate uniform, used until 2006, initially went with the city name in navy with white and red trim, but reversed the color scheme to white with red and navy trim after only two seasons. This uniform was the only one to feature the "NJ" alternate logo on the neckline. The red alternate uniform, which replaced the grey alternate and became the primary dark uniform in 2009, featured the team name in white with navy and silver trim. All uniforms featured thick navy and silver argyle stripes.

=== Brooklyn Nets ===
The Brooklyn Nets' former primary logo, used from the club's first season in Brooklyn in 2012 until 2024.

==== 2012–2017 ====
Upon moving to Brooklyn in 2012, the Nets went with a simple black and white uniform design, with "Brooklyn" in front of both the white and black uniforms. They also wore three different alternate uniforms. A grey-sleeved alternate with "Brooklyn" in Dodger blue, was first used in 2013 as a visual recall to the Brooklyn Dodgers. A white-sleeved alternate with the team name in black, featured the same "Stars and Stripes" look from the 1970s. A dark grey sleeveless alternate, meant to recall the 1980s New Jersey Nets uniforms, featured the team name in white and the city name in white written inside a black stripe.

==== 2017–present ====
With the switch from Adidas to Nike, the Nets kept most aspects of their visual identity intact. The white uniform became the "Association" uniform while the black uniform became the "Icon" uniform. The Nets have had three different versions of the "Statement" uniform. The first set, with "BKLYN" in white, was in dark grey and featured the same stars and stripes look from the 1970s. The uniform was updated in 2019 to a lighter grey base and black/dark grey stripes, with "BKLYN" written in graffiti style designed by Eric Haze. In 2022, the Nets again changed its "Statement" uniform, this time with a black base, black letters with silver trim, and a subtle greyscale herringbone striping with three black stars on the left.

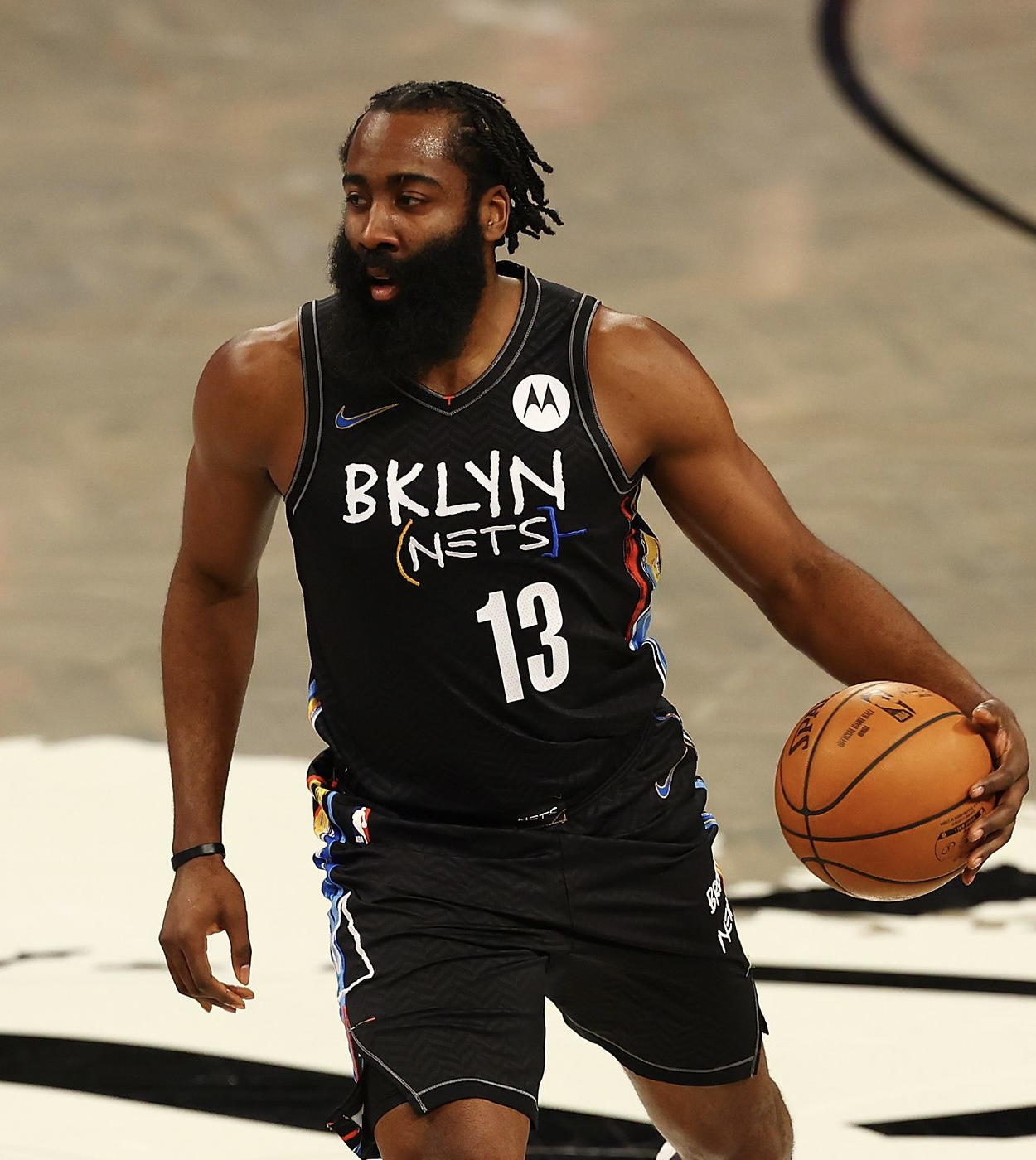
James Harden in the 2020–21 "City" uniform

The Nets also employed a fourth uniform option: the "City" uniform. The 2017–18 black "City" uniform featured the full team name spelled in white along with grey accents inspired from the Brooklyn Bridge. The following season, it was replaced with a black uniform featuring stylized Brooklyn camo patterns as a tribute to the Notorious B.I.G. This uniform was later brought back in 2025 and served as its "City" uniform for two seasons. For 2019–20, the Nets wore white versions of the "Biggie" uniforms, but with Haze-designed "BED-STUY" graffiti lettering in front (a reference to Bedford–Stuyvesant where the Notorious B.I.G. grew up). The 2020–21 "City" uniform, which honors Brooklyn-born artist Jean-Michel Basquiat, is predominantly black and features "BKLYN NETS" written in Basquiat's style along with multi-colored striping. The Basquiat-inspired "City" uniform returned in 2022–23 but in a white base.

In the 2021–22 season, the Nets' "City" uniform featured visual references to the Nets' uniform history. The navy base and white and silver argyle stripes recalled the 1997–2009 uniforms. The "Nets" wordmark and lettering were taken from the 1990–1997 uniforms. A red stripe with white stars honored the "Stars and Stripes" uniform of the 1970s and 1980s. A modified version of the 1980s New Jersey Nets logo, replacing the New Jersey outline with the map of Brooklyn, was added to the right leg. The 1997–2012 shield logo, also tweaked to feature the current "B" alternate logo, was added on the waist.

The "City" uniform for the 2023–24 season featured a collaboration with Brooklyn-based artist Kaws. The predominantly dark grey design featured splashes of light grey, blue, turquoise and pink inspired by Kaws' "Tension" series. The stylized "Nets" wordmark was also influenced by Kaws' graphic style. The design was slightly tweaked for the 2024–25 "City" uniform, this time with the color splashes relegated to the "Brooklyn" wordmark as part of an outer trim, with the base now featuring greyscale splashes.

A fifth uniform option, the "Earned" uniform, is released occasionally and is exclusive only to the teams who qualified in the NBA playoffs the previous year. The Nets, by virtue of qualifying in the 2020 NBA playoffs, were given an "Earned" uniform. The design featured the herringbone parquet style of the Barclays Center court in shades of black and grey, with Helvetica lettering inspired from the signs found at the New York City Subway.

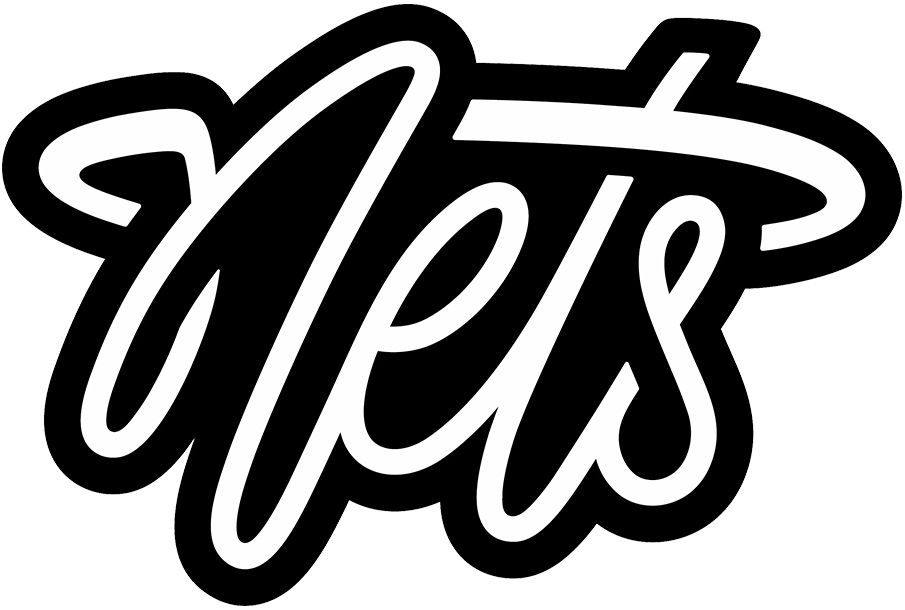
Secondary script logo for the Nets, introduced in 2024

In 2024, Brooklyn unveiled a streamlined brand set that retired the shield logo and elevated the "B" basketball mark to the primary logo, which also included the "B" basketball mark replacing the shield on the uniform shorts. The global roundel was updated to a crisper "Brooklyn Nets" circle seal around the central B. New secondary marks include an arched "BROOKLYN" wordmark and a script "Nets" mark, expanding typography beyond the previous block-only system.

== Culture ==
=== Mascot ===
Cover to BrooklyKnight #1, distributed at the Brooklyn Nets home opener. Art by Mike Deodato.

The mascot of the New Jersey Nets was Sly the Silver Fox, who debuted on October 31, 1997, as part of the rebranding of the Nets for the 1997–98 season. Prior to that, the Nets' mascot was an anthropomorphic dragon named Duncan the Dragon.

After the Nets' move to Brooklyn, the team introduced a new superhero mascot named BrooklyKnight (a pun on the demonym "Brooklynite") on November 3, 2012. In his first appearance, he was lowered from the ceiling of Barclays Center amid sparks and fanfare and introduced by Nets public address announcer David Diamante: "Here to defend Brooklyn, he's the BrooklyKnight." The mascot was co-created by Marvel Entertainment, a sister company to NBA broadcasters ABC and ESPN. The character also starred in a 32-page comic book published by Marvel titled BrooklyKnight #1, written by Jason Aaron with art from Mike Deodato. After the Nets' second season in Brooklyn, the BrooklyKnight mascot was retired, leaving the Nets mascotless.

=== Team anthem ===
On November 3, 2012, the Nets introduced a new team anthem titled "Brooklyn: Something To Lean On", written and recorded by Brooklyn-born musician John Forté. The song is notable for its refrain, which features the "Brooklyn" chant that has been popular with fans in the Barclays Center.

=== Brooklyn Brigade ===
The Brooklyn Brigade is a group of fans who are known for their loud chants and passionate attitude towards the Nets. The group was founded in November 2012 by Nets fan and Brooklyn native Udong "Bobby" Edemeka. Edemeka attended a few early season games of the team in their new Brooklyn home. Edemeka noticed that the team lacked a solid fan base in their new home, and decided to purchase tickets for a small group of roughly 20 fans who he noticed were regular followers of the team on the SB Nation online blog, NetsDaily.

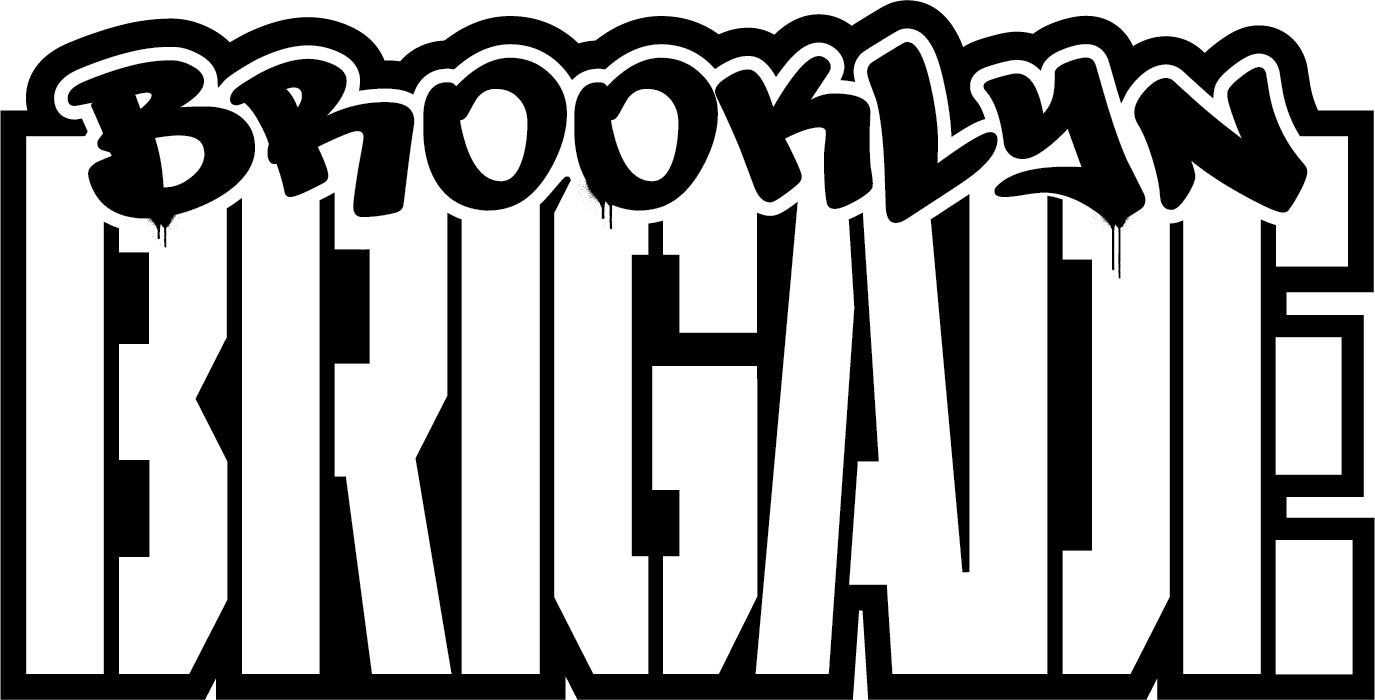

The Brigade was not yet based in Section 114. Instead, Edemeka would purchase tickets in whichever section he could, which often included nosebleed seats. The Brigade initially did not get much recognition from the Nets. Edemeka met with the CEO Irina Pavlova (of the ONEXIM Group), who was fond of the group's antics. Although Pavlova was a supporter of the group, other members of the organization were resistant to showing support for the Brigade. During the 2014–15 season, however, the Brooklyn Nets organization began assigning seats to the Brigade in Section 114 of the Barclays Center. This section is adjacent to the press booth and gave the Brooklyn Brigade exposure on a regional level and then eventually on a national level.

During the conference semifinals in 2014, while the Nets battled the Miami Heat, Brooklyn Nets and Barclays Center CEO Brett Yormark noticed the Brigade's effect on the arena, and he started to visit Section 114 distributing Nets' apparel. In 2016, the Nets hired Sean Marks as their general manager, who became an immediate supporter of the group. During the 2018–19 season, the Nets reserved section 114 for passionate fans, and called it "The BK Block". Although the Brigade is an independent fan group of the Nets, The Block comprises mostly Brigade members.

=== Mr. Whammy ===
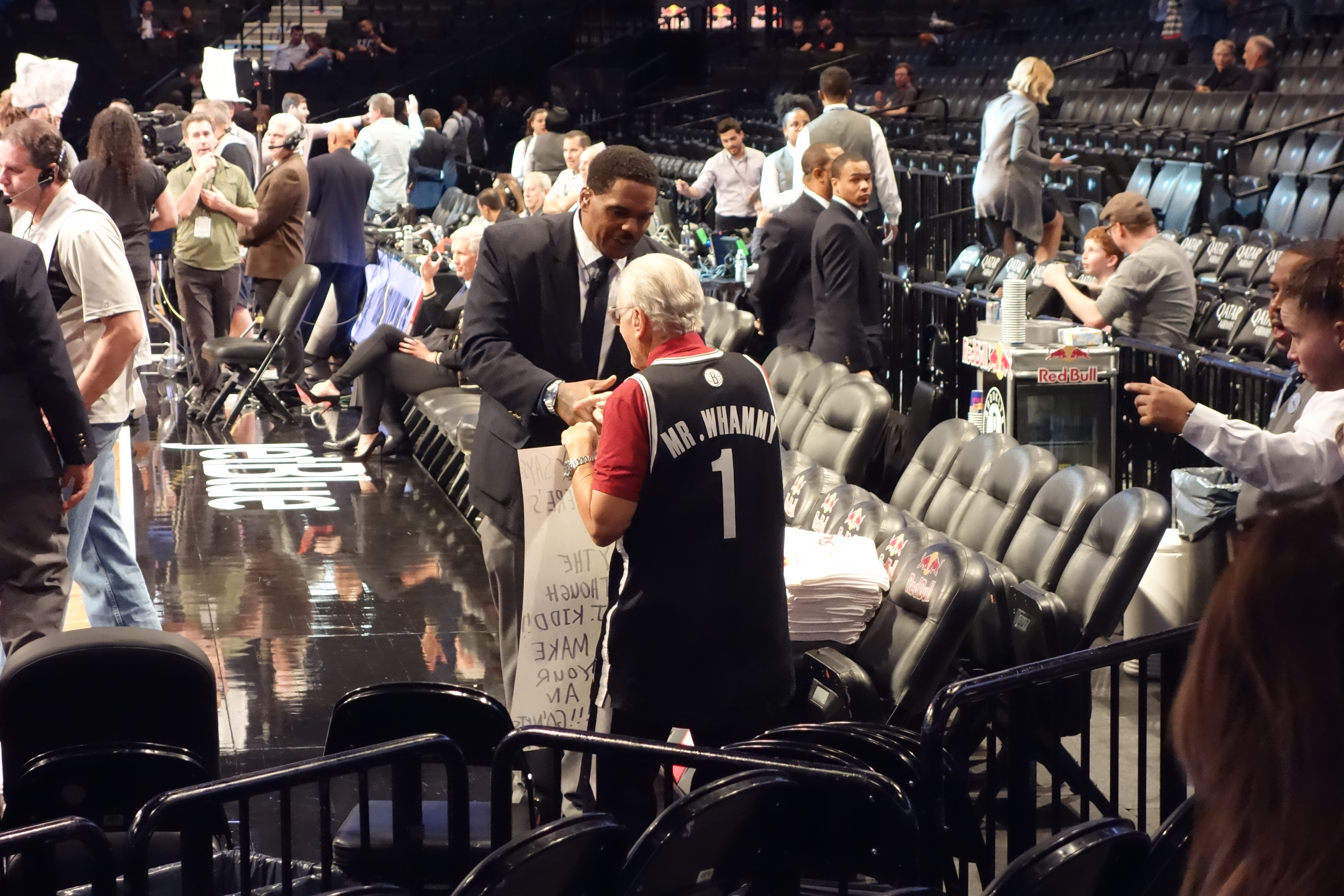
"Mr. Whammy" at Barclays Center in 2018

Bruce Reznick, known commonly as "Mr. Whammy", is an iconic 90-year-old Nets superfan. Reznick became a Nets season ticket holder in 1998 when the Nets played in Continental Airlines Arena. He is known for his signature "whammy", a practice in which he stands on the sidelines in view of opposing players while they are attempting free throws and tries to distract them with pointing, jumping, and yelling. Reznick will not "whammy" players that have previously played for the Nets. Reznick believes the practice is effective as Barclays Center often has one of the lowest opposing team free throw percentages in the league. For example, by January 11, 2023, opposing teams had only a 70.3 free throw shot percentage in Brooklyn, which was about eight points lower than league average for the 2022–23 NBA season. Before Reznick was given the name "Mr. Whammy" by Nets broadcaster Ian Eagle he was referred to as "Red Shirt". In 2026, Reznick and his late wife Judy were added to the James F. Goldstein SuperFan Gallery at the Naismith Basketball Hall of Fame.

== Management ==
On September 18, 2019, Joseph Tsai, the executive vice chairman of the Alibaba Group, completed the acquisition of full ownership of the Brooklyn Nets. With the closing of the transaction, Tsai became NBA Governor of the Nets and its affiliates. Additionally, former Turner Broadcasting president David Levy was named CEO of the Nets and Barclays Center. On November 12, the Nets and Barclays Center announced that David Levy would step down from the CEO position he had assumed less than two months before. Oliver Weisberg, president of Tsai's holding company J Tsai Sports, assumed an interim CEO role.

=== Ownership history ===
The original owner of the Nets franchise was trucking magnate Arthur J. Brown, who founded the team in 1967. The next year, Brown sold the team for $1.1 million to entrepreneur Roy Boe. Due to financial losses suffered while the team was on Long Island, Boe moved the team back to New Jersey in 1977 and sold the team a year later to a group of seven local businessmen led by Alan N. Cohen and Joseph Taub, who became known as the "Secaucus Seven".

After a lengthy ownership of the franchise and numerous unsuccessful attempts to improve the financial situation of the team, the "Secaucus Seven" finally sold the team in 1998 to a group of local real estate developers led by Raymond Chambers and Lewis Katz, who called themselves the "Community Youth Organization" and wanted to move the team to Newark, New Jersey. The next year the group signed an agreement with New York Yankees owner George Steinbrenner to form YankeeNets, a holding company that owned the two teams, and later also the New Jersey Devils, and increase leverage in future broadcast contracts by negotiating together. After receiving offers from several broadcast partners, including Cablevision, which held their rights at that time, YankeeNets decided to launch its own regional sports television called the YES Network.

YankeeNets failed in its attempts to secure a deal with Newark to construct a new arena in the city. By that point in time, tensions between the management of the Yankees, Nets, and the Devils had cause a rift between them, and a decision was made to split the group. With their plan to move the Nets dead, the Community Youth Organization placed the team up for sale. After a short bidding process, the group secured a deal in 2004 with real estate developer Bruce Ratner to buy the team for $300 million, defeating a similar offer by Charles Kushner and Senator Jon Corzine of New Jersey. Ratner had purchased the team with the intent of moving it to a new arena in Brooklyn, which was to be a centerpiece of the large-scale Atlantic Yards development.

Rapper Jay-Z owned a small minority stake in the Nets from 2003 until 2013. Jay-Z was a leader in the marketing for the team and helped encourage their move from New Jersey to the Barclays Center in Brooklyn, in which he also held a stake. He relinquished his stake after registering as a sports agent with his new agency Roc Nation Sports, to avert any potential conflicts of interest. His shares were eventually sold to singer, rapper, actor and entrepreneur Will Pan, making Pan the first American of Taiwanese descent to own a U.S. professional sports franchise.

On September 24, 2009, Mikhail Prokhorov, Russia's third-richest man according to Forbes, confirmed his intention to become majority owner of the Nets. Prokhorov sent an offer to the team owners requesting that the controlling shares of the basketball club be sold to his company, Onexim, for a symbolic price. In return, Prokhorov funded a loan of $700 million for the construction of Barclays Center, and attracted additional funds from Western banks. Prokhorov stated that he initiated the deal to help push Russian basketball to a new level of development. On May 11, 2010, following approval from the other owners of NBA teams, Prokhorov had become the principal owner of the Nets.

In late 2017, Prokhorov agreed to sell a 49% stake in the team to Joseph Tsai, with an option for Tsai to become the majority owner. The option was exercised in August 2019, with Tsai also buying the Nets' arena, Barclays Center, from Prokhorov for nearly $1 billion in a separate deal. The NBA Board of Governors unanimously approved the sale to Tsai on September 18, 2019.

== Facilities ==
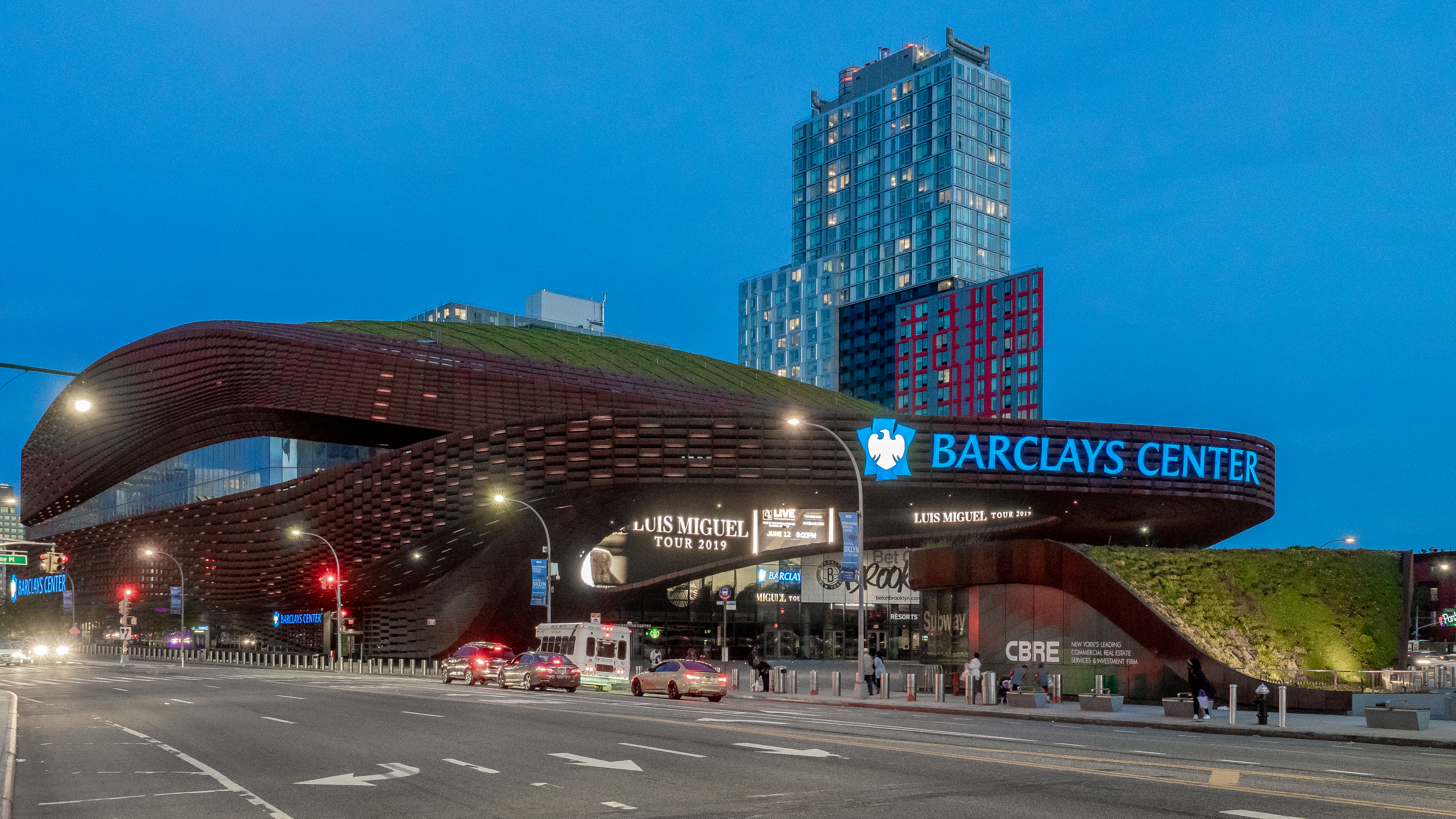
Barclays Center in 2019

=== Home arenas ===
| Arena | Location | Duration |
|---|---|---|
| Teaneck Armory | Teaneck, New Jersey | 1967–1968 |
| Long Island Arena | Commack, New York | 1968–1969 |
| Island Garden | West Hempstead, New York | 1969–1972 |
| Nassau Veterans Memorial Coliseum | Uniondale, New York | 1972–1977 |
| Rutgers Athletic Center | Piscataway, New Jersey | 1977–1981 |
| Meadowlands Arena originally Brendan Byrne Arena (1981–1996) renamed Continental Airlines Arena (1996–2007) renamed Izod Center (2007–2010) | East Rutherford, New Jersey | 1981–2010 |
| Prudential Center | Newark, New Jersey | 2010–2012 |
| Barclays Center | Brooklyn, New York | 2012–present |

=== Practice facilities ===
The Nets' practice facility and headquarters for the team's basketball operations are located at the Hospital for Special Surgery Training Center in the Industry City complex in the Sunset Park neighborhood of Brooklyn. The facility opened on February 17, 2016, and is built on the roof of an empty warehouse in the complex, occupying 70,000 square feet of space in total. The renovation project cost roughly $50 million. The opening of the training center completed the Nets' move to Brooklyn.

The team's previous practice facility was at the 65,000-square-foot PNY Center in East Rutherford, New Jersey, which opened in 1998. Prior to that, the team practiced at the APA Recreation Center in North Bergen, New Jersey, sharing their lockers and practice courts with truck drivers who used the facility, and at Ramapo College in Mahwah, New Jersey.

In the aftermath of Hurricane Sandy in November 2012, PNY Center suffered a power outage and extensive water damage due to flooding, and for several months, the team used the smaller training spaces and practice courts inside the Barclays Center instead.

== Personnel ==
=== Current roster ===
Brooklyn Nets roster
Players

| Pos. | No. | Player | Height | Weight | DOB | From |
|---|---|---|---|---|---|---|
| F | 34 | Tyler Bilodeau (TW) | 6 ft 8 in (2.03 m) | 230 lb (104 kg) | 2004-04-17 | UCLA |
| G | 0 | Mikel Brown Jr. | 6 ft 4 in (1.93 m) | 190 lb (86 kg) | 2006-04-03 | Louisville |
| F/C | 21 | Noah Clowney | 6 ft 10 in (2.08 m) | 240 lb (109 kg) | 2004-07-14 | Alabama |
| G | 8 | Egor Dëmin | 6 ft 9 in (2.06 m) | 212 lb (96 kg) | 2006-03-03 | BYU |
| G | 1 | Keon Ellis | 6 ft 4 in (1.93 m) | 180 lb (82 kg) | 2000-01-08 | Alabama |
| F | 9 | Joshua Jefferson (GL) | 6 ft 8 in (2.03 m) | 250 lb (113 kg) | 2003-11-21 | Iowa State |
| G/F | 31 | Chaney Johnson (TW) | 6 ft 7 in (2.01 m) | 235 lb (107 kg) | 2002-06-20 | Auburn |
| G/F | 14 | Terance Mann | 6 ft 5 in (1.96 m) | 220 lb (100 kg) | 1996-10-18 | Florida State |
| F | 00 | Josh Minott | 6 ft 9 in (2.06 m) | 215 lb (98 kg) | 2002-11-25 | Memphis |
| F | 16 | Grant Nelson (TW) | 6 ft 10 in (2.08 m) | 240 lb (109 kg) | 2002-03-18 | Alabama |
| F | 17 | Michael Porter Jr. | 6 ft 10 in (2.08 m) | 232 lb (105 kg) | 1998-06-29 | Missouri |
| G/F | 4 | Drake Powell | 6 ft 6 in (1.98 m) | 212 lb (96 kg) | 2005-09-08 | North Carolina |
| F/C | 30 | Julius Randle | 6 ft 9 in (2.06 m) | 256 lb (116 kg) | 1994-11-29 | Kentucky |
| G | 77 | Ben Saraf (GL) | 6 ft 5 in (1.96 m) | 212 lb (96 kg) | 2006-04-14 | Ramot Yam High School (Hefer, Israel) |
| C | 20 | Day'Ron Sharpe | 6 ft 10 in (2.08 m) | 265 lb (120 kg) | 2001-11-06 | North Carolina |
| G | 10 | Nolan Traoré | 6 ft 4 in (1.93 m) | 190 lb (86 kg) | 2006-05-28 | INSEP (Paris, France) |
| F/C | 13 | Moritz Wagner | 6 ft 11 in (2.11 m) | 255 lb (116 kg) | 1997-04-26 | Michigan |
| F | 2 | Danny Wolf (GL) | 6 ft 11 in (2.11 m) | 256 lb (116 kg) | 2004-05-05 | Michigan |

Coaches
**Head coach**
- Jordi Fernández
**Assistant(s)**
- Travis Bader
- Deividas Dulkys
- Ryan Forehan-Kelly
- Dutch Gaitley
- Connor Griffin
- Jay Hernandez
- Steve Hetzel
- Juwan Howard
- Corey Vinson

**Legend**
- **(DP)** Unsigned draft pick
- **(FA)** Free agent
- **(S)** Suspended
- **(GL)** On assignment to G League affiliate
- **(TW)** Two-way affiliate player
- Injured

Roster
Updated: September 4, 2026

=== Retained draft rights ===
The Nets hold the draft rights to the following unsigned draft picks who have been playing outside the NBA. A drafted player, either an international draftee or a college draftee who is not signed by the team that drafted him, is allowed to sign with any non-NBA team. In this case, the team retains the player's draft rights in the NBA until one year after the player's contract with the non-NBA team ends. This list includes draft rights that were acquired from trades with other teams.

| Draft | Round | Pick | Player | Pos. | Nationality | Current team | Note(s) | Ref |
|---|---|---|---|---|---|---|---|---|
| 2016 | 2 | 39 | David Michineau | G | France | Bursaspor Yörsan (Turkey) | Acquired from the Sacramento Kings (via LA Clippers and New Orleans) | |
| 2015 | 1 | 26 | Nikola Milutinov | C | Serbia | Olympiacos (Greece) | Acquired from the San Antonio Spurs | |
| 2015 | 2 | 49 | Aaron White | F | United States | Toyama Grouses (Japan) | Acquired from the Washington Wizards | |

=== Franchise leaders ===
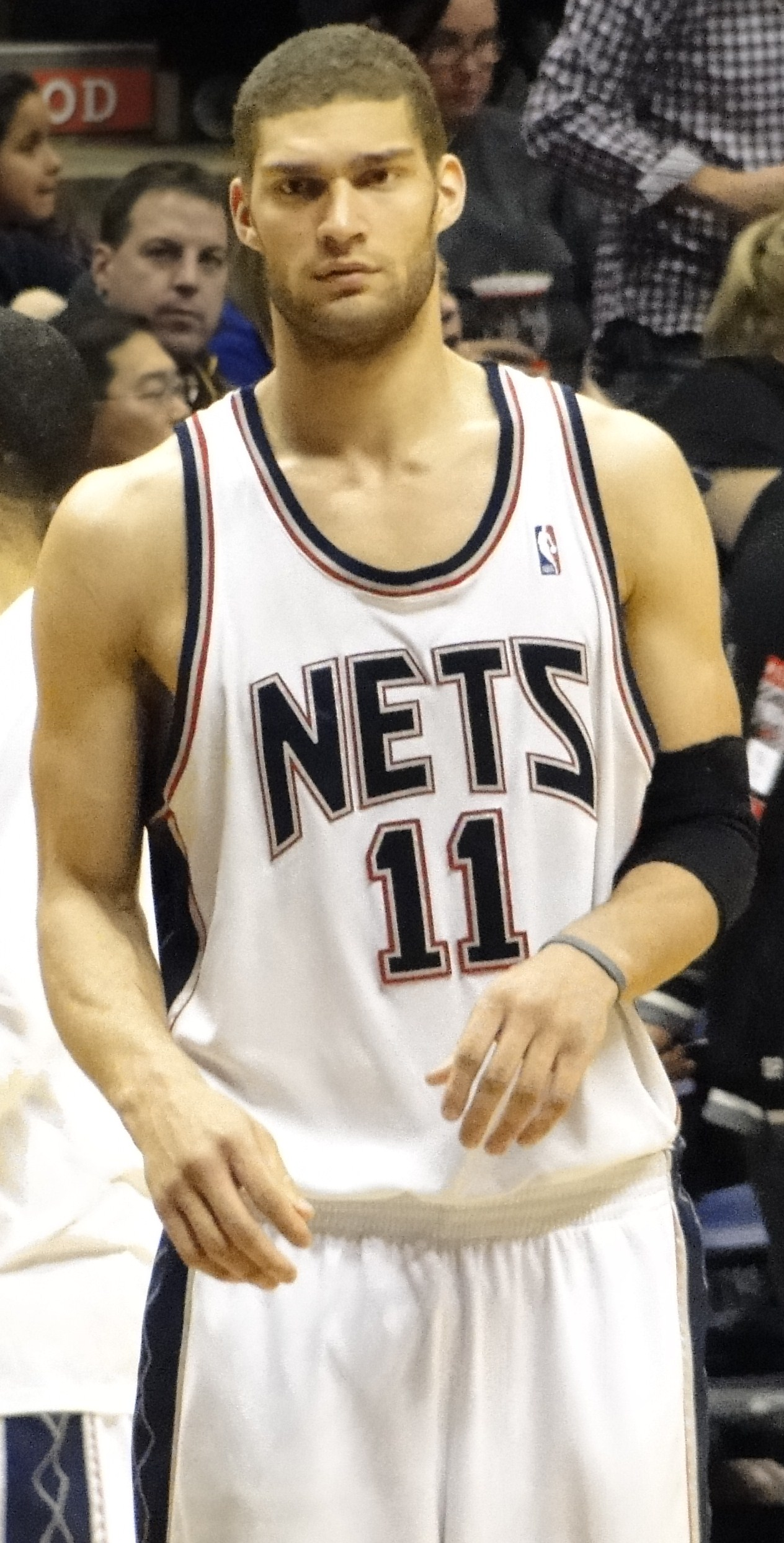
Brook Lopez played for the Nets from 2008 to 2017 and is franchise's leading scorer

Bold denotes still active with the team. Italics denotes still active, but not with the team. "Name*" includes combined statistics for the team from both the ABA and NBA.

Points scored (regular season) as of the end of the 2025–26 season

1. Brook Lopez (10,444)
2. Buck Williams (10,440)
3. Vince Carter (8,834)
4. Richard Jefferson (8,507)
5. Jason Kidd (7,373)
6. John Williamson* (7,202)
7. Julius Erving* (7,104)
8. Kerry Kittles (7,096)
9. Derrick Coleman (6,930)
10. Chris Morris (6,762)
11. Mike Gminski (6,415)
12. Billy Paultz* (6,297)
13. Bill Melchionni* (6,230)
14. Otis Birdsong (5,968)
15. Keith Van Horn (5,700)
16. Albert King (5,595)
17. Joe Harris (5,007)
18. Spencer Dinwiddie (4,953)
19. Kendall Gill (4,932)
20. Darwin Cook (4,699)

Other statistics (regular season) as of the end of the 2025–26 season

Most minutes played
| Player | Minutes |
|---|---|
| Buck Williams | 23,100 |
| Jason Kidd | 18,733 |
| Brook Lopez | 18,118 |
| Richard Jefferson | 17,499 |
| Kerry Kittles | 16,686 |

Most rebounds
| Player | Rebounds |
|---|---|
| Buck Williams | 7,576 |
| Billy Paultz* | 4,544 |
| Brook Lopez | 4,005 |
| Derrick Coleman | 3,690 |
| Mike Gminski | 3,671 |

Most assists
| Player | Assists |
|---|---|
| Jason Kidd | 4,620 |
| Bill Melchionni* | 3,044 |
| Kenny Anderson | 2,363 |
| Deron Williams | 2,078 |
| Spencer Dinwiddle | 1,985 |

Most steals
| Player | Steals |
|---|---|
| Jason Kidd | 950 |
| Darwin Cook | 875 |
| Kerry Kittles | 803 |
| Chris Morris | 784 |
| Kendall Gill | 652 |

Most blocks
| Player | Blocks |
|---|---|
| Brook Lopez | 972 |
| George Johnson | 863 |
| Buck Williams | 696 |
| **Nic Claxton** | 611 |
| Mike Gminski | 599 |

=== Retired numbers ===
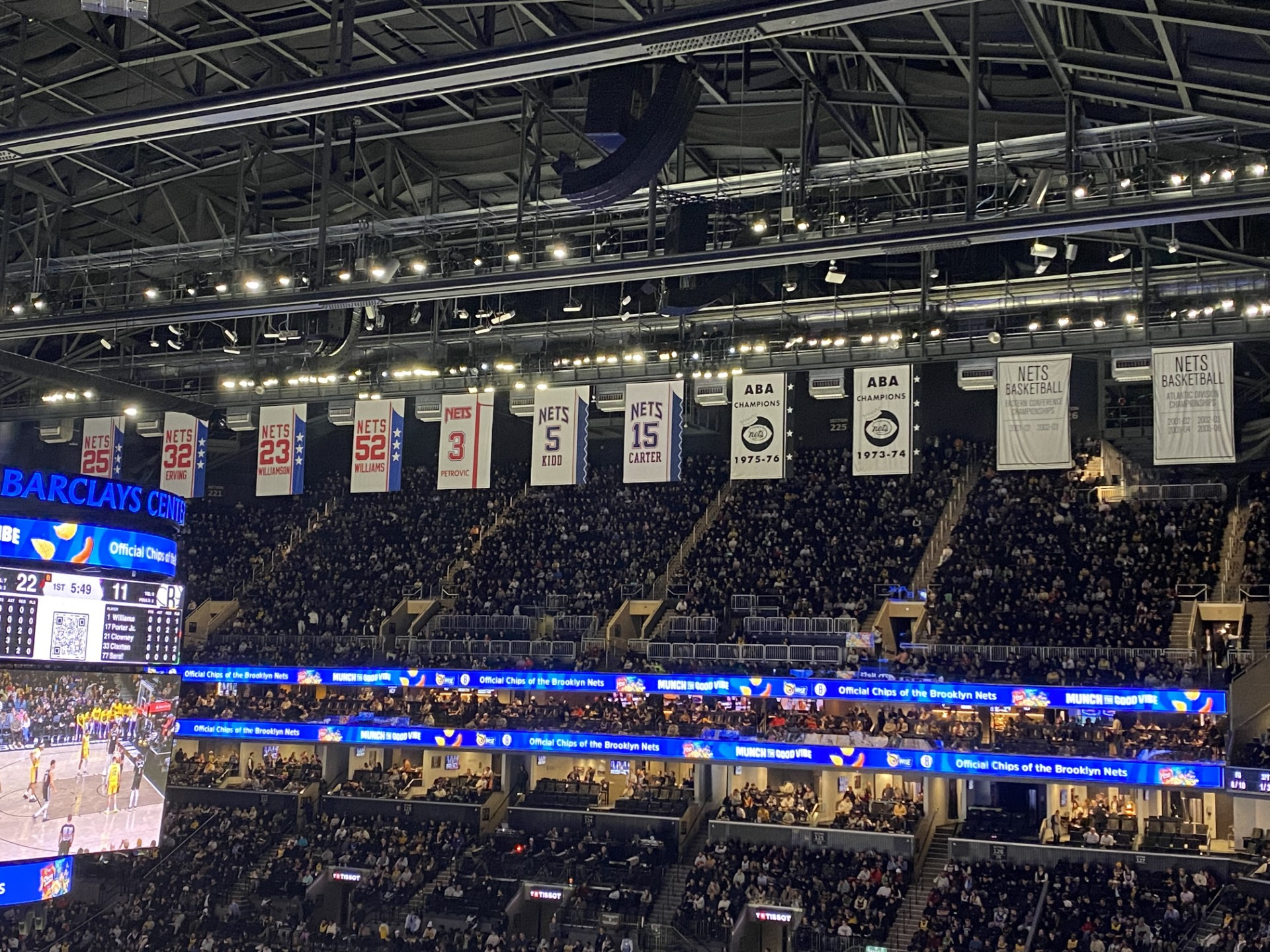
Nets retired numbers and championship banners hanging during a game against the Los Angeles Lakers on February 3, 2026

Brooklyn Nets retired numbers
| No. | Player | Position | Tenure | Date |
|---|---|---|---|---|
| 3 | Dražen Petrović | G | 1991–1993 | November 11, 1993 |
| 5 | Jason Kidd | G | 2001–2008 | October 17, 2013 |
| 15 | Vince Carter | G/F | 2004–2009 | January 25, 2025 |
| 23 | John Williamson | G | 1973–1980 | December 7, 1990 |
| 25 | Bill Melchionni | G | 1969–1976 | September 1976 |
| 32 | Julius Erving | F | 1973–1976 | April 3, 1987 |
| 52 | Buck Williams | F | 1981–1989 | April 11, 1999 |

- The NBA retired Bill Russell's No. 6 for all its member teams on August 11, 2022.

=== Basketball Hall of Famers ===
Players
| No. | Name | Position | Tenure | Inducted |
|---|---|---|---|---|
| 24 | Rick Barry | F | 1970–1972 | 1987 |
| 1 | Nate Archibald | G | 1976–1977 | 1991 |
| 32 | Julius Erving | F | 1973–1976 | 1993 |
| 21 | Bob McAdoo | C | 1981 | 2000 |
| 3 | Dražen Petrović | G | 1991–1993 | 2002 |
| 34 | Mel Daniels | C | 1976 | 2012 |
| 22 | Bernard King | F | 1977–1979 | 2013 |
| 30 | Bernard King | F | 1993 | 2013 |
| 33 | Alonzo Mourning | C | 2003–2004 | 2014 |
| 55 | Dikembe Mutombo | C | 2002–2003 | 2015 |
| 10 | Maurice Cheeks | G | 1992–1993 | 2018 |
| 5 | Jason Kidd (Note: Kidd was inducted into the Hall of Fame twice – as player and as a member of the 2008 Olympic team. Also served as head coach of the team in 2013–2014.) | G | 2001–2008 | 2018 |
| 2 | Kevin Garnett | F | 2013–2015 | 2020 |
| 34 | Paul Pierce | F | 2013–2014 | 2021 |
| 15 | Vince Carter | G/F | 2004–2009 | 2024 |

Coaches
| Name | Position | Tenure | Inducted |
|---|---|---|---|
| Lou Carnesecca | Head coach | 1970–1973 | 1992 |
| Chuck Daly (Note: Daly was inducted into the Hall of Fame twice – as coach and as a member of the 1992 Olympic team.) | Head coach | 1992–1994 | 1994 |
| Larry Brown | Head coach | 1981–1983 | 2002 |
| John Calipari | Head coach | 1996–1999 | 2015 |
| Bill Fitch | Head coach | 1989–1992 | 2019 |

Contributors
| Name | Position | Tenure | Inducted |
|---|---|---|---|
| Rod Thorn | Assistant coach | 1973–1975, 1976–1978 | 2018 |
| Rod Thorn | Executive | 2000–2010 | 2018 |
| Del Harris | Assistant coach | 2009–2010 | 2022 |
| Mike D'Antoni (Note: D'Antoni was inducted into the Hall of Fame twice – as contributor and as a member of the 2008 Olympic team.) | Assistant coach | 2020–2021 | 2026 |

==== FIBA Hall of Fame ====
Players
| No. | Name | Position | Tenure | Inducted |
|---|---|---|---|---|
| 3 | Dražen Petrović | G | 1991–1993 | 2007 |
| 33 | Alonzo Mourning | C | 2003–2004 | 2019 |

Coaches
| Name | Position | Tenure | Inducted |
|---|---|---|---|
| Chuck Daly (Note: Daly was inducted into the FIBA Hall of Fame twice – as coach and as a member of the 1992 Olympic team.) | Head coach | 1992–1994 | 2021 |

== Individual awards ==
=== NBA ===
NBA Rookie of the Year

- Buck Williams – 1982
- Derrick Coleman – 1991

NBA Executive of the Year

- Rod Thorn – 2002

NBA Sportsmanship Award

- Patty Mills – 2022

J. Walter Kennedy Citizenship Award

- Wayne Ellington – 2016

All-NBA First Team

- Jason Kidd – 2002, 2004

All-NBA Second Team

- Buck Williams – 1983
- Jason Kidd – 2003
- Kevin Durant – 2022

All-NBA Third Team

- Derrick Coleman – 1993, 1994
- Dražen Petrović – 1993
- Stephon Marbury – 2000
- Kyrie Irving – 2021

NBA All-Defensive First Team

- Jason Kidd – 2002, 2006

NBA All-Defensive Second Team

- Buck Williams – 1988
- Jason Kidd – 2003–2005, 2007

NBA All-Rookie First Team

- Bernard King – 1978
- Buck Williams – 1982
- Derrick Coleman – 1991
- Keith Van Horn – 1998
- Kenyon Martin – 2001
- Brook Lopez – 2009
- Mason Plumlee – 2014

NBA All-Rookie Second Team

- Chris Morris – 1989
- Kerry Kittles – 1997
- Richard Jefferson – 2002
- Nenad Krstić – 2005
- Marcus Williams – 2007
- MarShon Brooks – 2012
- Bojan Bogdanović – 2015

=== ABA ===
ABA Most Valuable Player

- Julius Erving – 1974–1976

ABA Playoffs Most Valuable Player

- Julius Erving – 1974, 1976

ABA Rookie of the Year

- Brian Taylor – 1973

All-ABA Team First Team

- Rick Barry – 1971, 1972
- Bill Melchionni – 1972
- Julius Erving – 1974–1976

All-ABA Team Second Team

- Brian Taylor – 1975

ABA All-Time Team

- Rick Barry – 1997
- Julius Erving – 1997
- Billy Paultz – 1997

ABA All-Time MVP

- Julius Erving – 1997

ABA All-Defensive Team

- Mike Gale – 1974
- Brian Taylor – 1975, 1976
- Julius Erving – 1976

ABA All-Rookie Team

- John Roche – 1972
- Jim Chones – 1973
- Brian Taylor – 1973
- Larry Kenon – 1974
- John Williamson – 1974
- Kim Hughes – 1976

=== NBA All-Star Weekend ===
NBA All-Star Game

- Buck Williams – 1982, 1983, 1986
- Otis Birdsong – 1984
- Micheal Ray Richardson – 1985
- Kenny Anderson – 1994
- Derrick Coleman – 1994
- Jayson Williams – 1998
- Stephon Marbury – 2001
- Jason Kidd – 2002–2004, 2007, (Note: Did not participate) 2008
- Kenyon Martin – 2004
- Vince Carter – 2005–2007
- Devin Harris – 2009
- Deron Williams – 2012
- Brook Lopez – 2013
- Joe Johnson – 2014
- D'Angelo Russell – 2019
- Kevin Durant – 2021, 2022
- James Harden – 2021
- Kyrie Irving – 2021

NBA All-Star Game head coaches

- Byron Scott – 2002

=== ABA All-Star Game ===
ABA All-Star Game

- Julius Erving – 1974–1976
- Bill Melchionni – 1971–1973
- Billy Paultz – 1973–1975 (Note: Did not participate in 1974)
- Rick Barry – 1971, 1972
- Larry Kenon – 1974, 1975
- Brian Taylor – 1975, 1976
- Tony Jackson – 1968
- Walt Simon – 1969
- Levern Tart – 1970

ABA All-Star Game head coaches

- Kevin Loughery – 1975, 1976

ABA Slam Dunk Contest

- Julius Erving – 1976

== NBA D-League/G League affiliation ==
The Nets signed an agreement with the Springfield Armor to become its exclusive NBA Development League affiliate starting in the 2011–12 season. This made the Nets the second team to opt for a D-League "hybrid affiliation", the first being the Houston Rockets with the Rio Grande Valley Vipers. Springfield ownership maintained control over business, marketing, and day-to-day operations, with the Nets having control over coaching and player decisions. This hybrid model was well received by GMs and owners. However, after three seasons, the Detroit Pistons purchased the Armor from its former owners, and moved and renamed the team the Grand Rapids Drive.

On November 6, 2015, the Nets announced that they had purchased a new D-League team to be called the Long Island Nets. The team played their home games during the 2016–17 season at the Barclays Center and then at the Nassau Coliseum in Uniondale, New York, after renovations were complete for the 2017–18 season. The Long Island Nets became the twelfth D-League team to be owned by an NBA team.

== Media ==
The television home of the Nets is the YES Network, which the team helped create while they were under the corporate umbrella of YankeeNets, a merger of business operations between the Nets and the New York Yankees. After the dissolution of YankeeNets and Bruce Ratner's purchase of the team, YES signed a long-term deal to keep broadcasting Nets games. The sale to the Ratner group did not include the percentage of YES that was previously owned by the Nets, which remains with the pre-merger Nets owners. Prior to that, the Nets' TV home was Fox Sports Net New York and SportsChannel New York.

Select playoff and late regular season games are broadcast over-the-air on WLNY-TV instead of on YES, when Yankees games are airing at the same time. Previously these games aired on WPIX or WWOR-TV.

The current flagship radio station of the Nets is WFAN, which took over the radio rights to the Nets after losing their basketball contract with the Knicks (who moved to WEPN). Prior to that, Nets games aired on WNEW, WMCA, WVNJ, WNBC, WQEW, and WOR.

In the club's early ABA years, some Sunday road games were televised in a package carried by WPIX. The team's later ABA tenure featured more frequent road telecasts on their current broadcast partner, WWOR-TV. Known then as WOR-TV, it continued airing road games for a time once the team joined the NBA in 1976.

=== Television ===
Ian Eagle has been the sole television play-by-play announcer for the Nets since the departure of Marv Albert in 2011. Eagle became the lead television voice for the team in 1995 after serving as the team's radio voice for one year, while Albert joined the Nets following his firing by MSG Network in 2005 after four decades as the lead voice of the New York Knicks. When Albert joined the broadcast team, he became the lead broadcaster with Eagle as his substitute; beginning in the 2009–10 season, due to Albert's advancing age and his other commitments, Eagle once again assumed the lead play-by-play spot. Ryan Ruocco substitutes for Eagle during the latter's CBS NFL and NCAA commitments.

As of 2024, Sarah Kustok, Ian Eagle, Ryan Ruocco, and/or Noah Eagle provide color commentary on YES Network broadcasts, and Meghan Triplett serves as courtside reporter.

=== Radio ===
WFAN is the Nets' current radio flagship, the station having assumed radio rights from WOR following the 2003–04 season. Chris Carrino and Tim Capstraw comprise the broadcast team, Carrino on play-by-play and Capstraw as the analyst. The games air on other Entercom-operated stations, such as WCBS (AM) and WXBK, when there are programming conflicts on WFAN.

Other broadcasters who have worked for the Nets include Howard David, Bob Papa, Bill Raftery, Kelly Tripucka, Albert King, Mike O'Koren, Spencer Ross, Mel Proctor, Joe Tait, John Sterling, John Minko and Mark Jackson.

Nets games have also aired on WNEW and WQEW in the past.

During the club's ABA years, announcers included Marty Glickman, Marv Albert's brothers Al Albert and Steve Albert, baseball Hall of Fame pitcher Bob Gibson, Bob Goldsholl, as well as Sterling and Vince DiTomasso. The latter two joined the club's move into the NBA.

== Notes ==
| Preceded by Indiana Pacers; Kentucky Colonels | ABA champions 1973–74; 1975–76 | Succeeded by Kentucky Colonels; None (league merged with the NBA) |
