= Island Garden =

Multi-purpose arena in West Hempstead, New York

Coordinates: 40°42′26″N 73°39′24″W

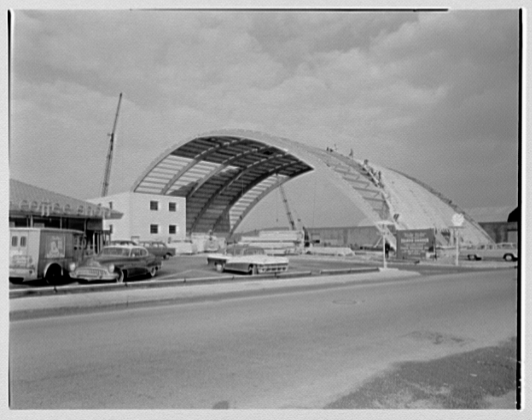
Island Garden under construction in 1956

The Island Garden Arena was a 5,200-seat arena in West Hempstead, on Long Island, in New York, United States.

== History ==
The arena was built in 1957 by Arnold "Whitey" Carlson, a descendant of Swedish immigrants. Carlson's grandfather was Henrik Carlson, a noted San Diego sculptor who was the Foreign Art Director for the San Diego Exposition (now Balboa Park).

Over the years, concert acts such as Cream, the Dave Clark Five, Louis Armstrong, The Byrds, The Jeff Beck Group, The Rascals, Sly and the Family Stone, Duke Ellington, Joan Baez, Procol Harum, Johnny Cash and Bob Dylan performed at the venue. The Island Garden Arena also hosted boxing matches, professional wrestling, circuses, rodeos, stamp shows, midget car racing, and boat shows.

The arena hosted the New York Nets of the American Basketball Association from 1969 to 1972. Sportswriter Bob Ryan once called it the "least professional, lowest-class facility in pro basketball", equating the row of stands on one side (five, where the other side had 15) to a high school gym. Team owner Roy Boe stated in the ABA book Loose Balls that playing in the arena was done merely to wait for the Nassau Coliseum to be built, as the Garden was less than satisfactory, noting the problems with the water and even having to deal with the aftermath of if the circus had just left town.

The Nets were unable to play any home playoff games in 1971 because the arena was booked with other events; they played two home playoff games at Hofstra University, and one at Madison Square Garden's Felt Forum. In 1971–72, the Nets posted their first winning season, advancing all the way to the 1972 ABA Finals, where they lost to the Indiana Pacers. Late in the season, the team moved from the Island Garden into the new Nassau Coliseum. In 1976, the Nets were admitted into the National Basketball Association, moved to New Jersey, and eventually becoming today's Brooklyn Nets.

The arena was partially demolished in 1973, unable to compete with Nassau Coliseum. A shopping center was built on that portion of the site. The remaining portion of the structure was rebuilt into a youth basketball venue in 1998. It has three courts for simultaneous gameplay or practice. Today, the location of Island Garden is 45 Cherry Valley Avenue, West Hempstead.

== See also ==
- Long Island Arena
- Shea Stadium

== See also ==
Preceded by Long Island Arena	Home of the New York Nets; 1969 – 1972	Succeeded by Nassau Coliseum
