= Teaneck Armory =

New Jersey National Guard armory in Teaneck, NJ

Coordinates: 40°54′37″N 73°59′53″W

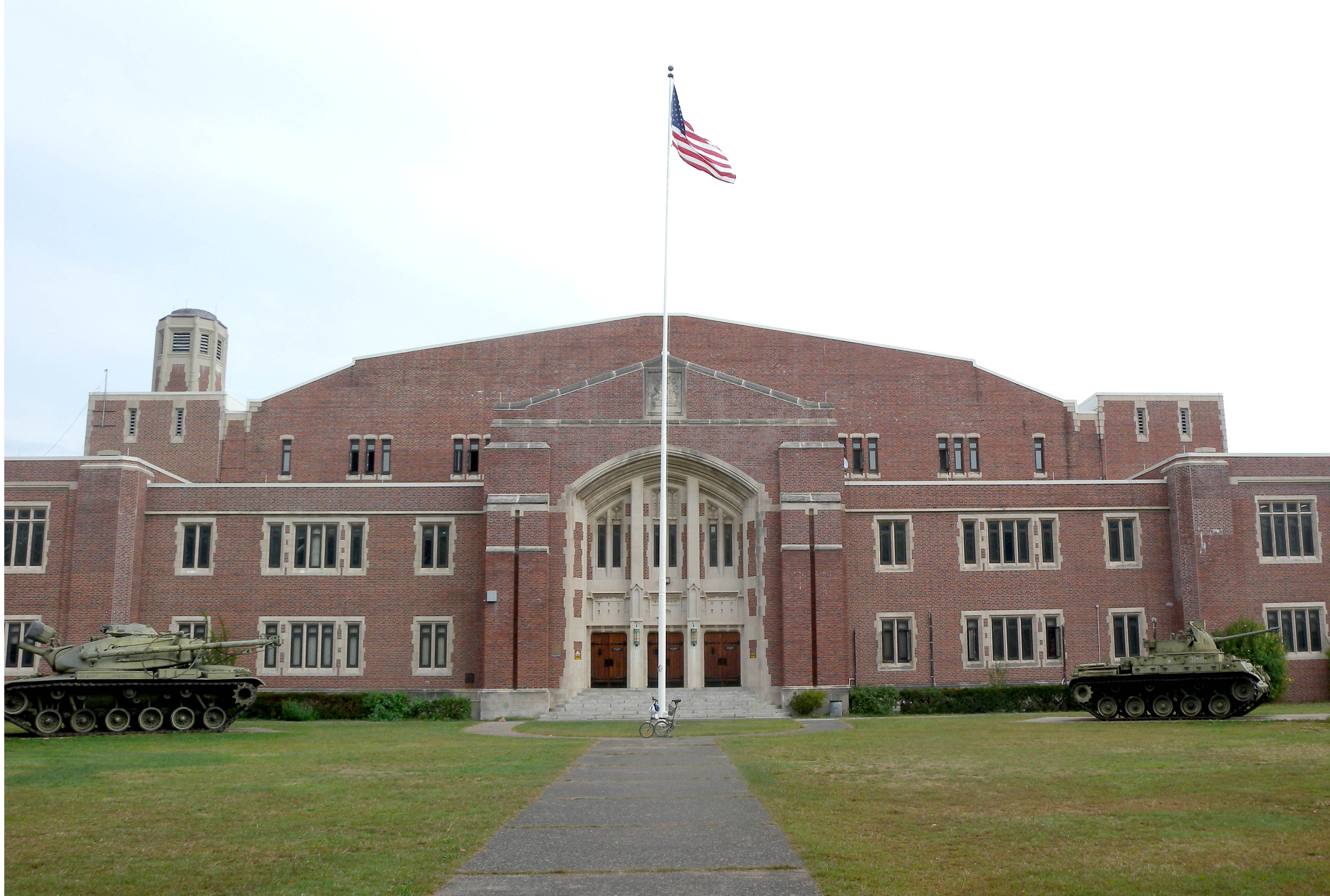
West front On the right: An M42 Duster Self Propelled Anti Aircraft Vehicle

Teaneck Armory is an armory and arena located on a 13.66-acre (55,300 m^{2}) site in Teaneck, New Jersey. It is owned and operated by the New Jersey National Guard.

== History ==
The facility was completed in 1936 at a cost of $1 million. It was designed by Louis S. Kaplan (1896–1964), who as a young architect won a competition to design the Trenton War Memorial and after its dedication became the leading state architect until the early 1960s, designing or adapting many of its armories.

From 1967–68, the arena was the home of the New Jersey Americans of the American Basketball Association, the team that later became today's Brooklyn Nets in the National Basketball Association. In 1968, the Americans were forced to forfeit a playoff game against the Kentucky Colonels because a circus group had rented the armory that week and the alternate location selected for the game, Long Island Arena in Commack, New York, had a floor in such poor condition that it was deemed unplayable.

Over the years the expansive floor and high-ceilinged space has been used for numerous film shoots, including Sweet and Lowdown, You've Got Mail, Bogus, and Stonewall. The armory has also hosted concerts, three-quarter midget car races, Boy Scout jamborees, professional wrestling, political rallies (including a November 6, 1960 campaign rally by presidential candidate John F. Kennedy), circuses, indoor soccer and various military uses. It has also been used for ceremonies and celebrations commemorating Eid ul-Adha.

== National Guard ==
The Teaneck Armory can be distinguished by the M42 Duster anti-aircraft vehicle and the M728 Combat Engineer Vehicle facing Teaneck Road. During 2005, the major units of the 50th Main Support Battalion assigned to drill at the Armory were deployed for service in Iraq and Kuwait, along with many other units of the New Jersey National Guard. Other elements of the New Jersey National Guard based at the Teaneck Armory have been deployed to Afghanistan, Guantanamo Bay, and Kosovo, among other places. Additionally, a squadron of the New Jersey Wing of the Civil Air Patrol is located at the Armory.

== Flag ==
In 2010, the armory unfurled its first garrison flag since 1936. Received as donation, the flag had hung over Wall Street office building for 21 days after the September 2001 attacks. 15 feet wide and 20 feet long, it weighs 50 pounds.

== See also ==
- Jersey City Armory
- Paterson Armory

Preceded by first arena	Home of the New Jersey Americans; 1967 – 1968	Succeeded by Long Island Arena
