= Long Island Arena =

Former indoor arena in Commack, New York

Coordinates: 40°50′18″N 73°17′0″W

- Interactive map of Long Island Arena
- Location: Commack, New York
- Capacity: Basketball: 6,500; Ice hockey: 4,000
- Surface: Ice

Construction
- Built: 1956–1959
- Opened: 1959
- Closed: 1996

Tenants
- Long Island Ducks (EHL) (1959–1973); New York Tapers (ABL) (1962); New York Nets (ABA) (1968–1969); Long Island Cougars (NAHL) (1973–1975); Long Island Ducks (EBA) (1977–1978)

Long Island Arena (also commonly known as the Commack Arena, Suffolk Forum, and The Island Music Center) was a 4,000-seat indoor arena in Commack, New York that was in use from 1959 until 1996. The Long Island Ducks of the Eastern Hockey League, a popular team in the small community, called the arena home from 1959 until the league folded in 1973, one year after the New York Islanders came into existence. The Long Island Cougars (an affiliate of the WHA's Chicago Cougars) also played at the Long Island Arena from 1973 through 1975.

John F. Kennedy made a visit to the arena on November 6, 1960, while campaigning for the presidency.

From 1968 to 1969, the Commack Arena briefly served as the home of the New York Nets of the American Basketball Association. Before the team's move to Long Island, the then-New Jersey Americans had scheduled a game against the Kentucky Colonels at the Commack Arena on March 23, 1968. The Americans and Colonels were tied in the standings, and a "play-in" game to determine who would qualify for the playoffs. The Americans were forced to move the game at the last minute because their normal home, the Teaneck Armory, was booked with the circus. However, when the Colonels and Americans arrived at the arena, they found the court full of holes and laden with condensation from a Ducks hockey game the previous night. The court was also unstable. The Colonels refused to take the court under these conditions. The league ruled that the Americans had failed to provide acceptable facilities and forfeited the game to the Colonels, 2–0. For the 1968-69 season, the now-Nets spent money sprucing up the arena that would see the court laid over ice, which basically meant ice would be at the end of the court fully exposed to go along with a room temperature below 50 degrees to not melt the ice.

Peter Frampton recorded part of his 8× platinum double album, Frampton Comes Alive, at the arena.

The Long Island Ducks of the Eastern Basketball Association also spent one season playing at Long Island Arena during 1977–1978.

Along with hockey and basketball, the Long Island Arena was used for ice skating, the circus, the Suffolk County Fair and concerts.

During the 1980s and 1990s, the Long Island Arena housed a large, indoor flea market until the facility closed on July 31, 1996. A shopping center, consisting of Target, Hobby Lobby, and a Whole Foods supermarket, among other stores and restaurants, now stands on the former site of the arena, which was located on the south side of Veterans Highway just west of the Sunken Meadow State Parkway.

Preceded by Teaneck Armory	Home of the New York Nets; 1968 – 1969	Succeeded by Island Garden
