= List of Brooklyn Nets seasons =

This is a list of seasons completed by the Brooklyn Nets professional basketball team. The Nets were founded as the New Jersey Americans, a charter franchise of the American Basketball Association (ABA), in 1967. The club later played in the ABA as the New York Nets. After the 1975–76 season, the ABA merged with the National Basketball Association (NBA) and the Nets joined the NBA. Following the team's first season in the NBA, it moved back to New Jersey and was renamed the New Jersey Nets. After 35 seasons in New Jersey, the team moved to the New York City borough of Brooklyn in 2012 and became the Brooklyn Nets.

== Seasons ==
| ABA champions | NBA champions | Conference champions | Division champions | Playoff berth |

| Season | League | Conference | Finish | Division | Finish | Wins | Losses | Win% | Playoffs | Awards | Head coach |
|---|---|---|---|---|---|---|---|---|---|---|---|
New Jersey Americans
| 1967–68 | ABA | — | — | Eastern | 5th (Note: The Americans tied the Kentucky Colonels for fourth place and the final playoff berth in the Eastern Division. A one-game playoff was to be played on the Americans' home court, but because a suitable venue could not be found in time, the game was forfeited to the Colonels and the Americans finished fifth in the division.) | 36 | 42 | .462 | — | | Max Zaslofsky |
New York Nets
| 1968–69 | ABA | — | — | Eastern | 5th | 17 | 61 | .218 | — | | Max Zaslofsky |
| 1969–70 | ABA | — | — | Eastern | 4th | 39 | 45 | .464 | Lost division semifinals (Colonels) 4–3 | | York Larese |
| 1970–71 | ABA | — | — | Eastern | 3rd | 40 | 44 | .476 | Lost division semifinals (Squires) 4–2 | | Lou Carnesecca |
| 1971–72 | ABA | — | — | Eastern | 3rd | 44 | 40 | .524 | Won division semifinals (Colonels) 4–2; Won division finals (Squires) 4–2; Lost ABA Finals (Pacers) 4–2 | | Lou Carnesecca |
| 1972–73 | ABA | — | — | Eastern | 4th | 30 | 54 | .357 | Lost division semifinals (Cougars) 4–1 | Brian Taylor (ROY) | Lou Carnesecca |
| 1973–74 | ABA | — | — | Eastern | 1st | 55 | 29 | .655 | Won division semifinals (Squires) 4–1; Won division finals (Kentucky) 4–0; Won ABA Finals (Stars) 4–1 | Julius Erving (MVP, PMVP) | Kevin Loughery |
| 1974–75 | ABA | — | — | Eastern | 2nd (Note: The Nets tied the Kentucky Colonels for first place in the Eastern Division. A one-game playoff was played on April 4, 1975, where the Colonels defeated the Nets 108–99, and thus the Nets finished second.) | 58 | 26 | .690 | Lost division semifinals (Spirits) 4–1 | Julius Erving (MVP) | Kevin Loughery |
| 1975–76 | ABA | — | — | — (Note: The league abolished division play during the season.) | 2nd | 55 | 29 | .655 | Won ABA semifinals (Spurs) 4–3; Won ABA Finals (Nuggets) 4–2 | Julius Erving (MVP, PMVP) | Kevin Loughery |
| 1976–77 | NBA | Eastern | 11th | Atlantic | 5th | 22 | 60 | .268 | — | | Kevin Loughery |
New Jersey Nets
| 1977–78 | NBA | Eastern | 11th | Atlantic | 5th | 24 | 58 | .293 | — | | Kevin Loughery |
| 1978–79 | NBA | Eastern | 6th | Atlantic | 3rd | 37 | 45 | .451 | Lost first round (76ers) 2–0 | | Kevin Loughery |
| 1979–80 | NBA | Eastern | 10th | Atlantic | 5th | 34 | 48 | .415 | — | | Kevin Loughery |
| 1980–81 | NBA | Eastern | 10th | Atlantic | 5th | 24 | 58 | .293 | — | | Kevin Loughery; Bob MacKinnon |
| 1981–82 | NBA | Eastern | 4th | Atlantic | 3rd | 44 | 38 | .537 | Lost first round (Bullets) 2–0 | Buck Williams (ROY) | Larry Brown |
| 1982–83 | NBA | Eastern | 4th | Atlantic | 3rd | 49 | 33 | .598 | Lost first round (Knicks) 2–0 | | Larry Brown; Bill Blair |
| 1983–84 | NBA | Eastern | 6th | Atlantic | 4th | 45 | 37 | .549 | Won first round (76ers) 3–2; Lost conference semifinals (Bucks) 4–2 | | Stan Albeck |
| 1984–85 | NBA | Eastern | 5th | Atlantic | 3rd | 42 | 40 | .512 | Lost first round (Pistons) 3–0 | | Stan Albeck |
| 1985–86 | NBA | Eastern | 7th | Atlantic | 3rd | 39 | 43 | .476 | Lost first round (Bucks) 3–0 | | Dave Wohl |
| 1986–87 | NBA | Eastern | 10th | Atlantic | 4th | 24 | 58 | .293 | — | | Dave Wohl |
| 1987–88 | NBA | Eastern | 11th | Atlantic | 5th | 19 | 63 | .232 | — | | Dave Wohl; Bob MacKinnon; Willis Reed |
| 1988–89 | NBA | Eastern | 11th | Atlantic | 5th | 26 | 56 | .317 | — | | Willis Reed |
| 1989–90 | NBA | Eastern | 13th | Atlantic | 6th | 17 | 65 | .207 | — | | Bill Fitch |
| 1990–91 | NBA | Eastern | 11th | Atlantic | 5th | 26 | 56 | .317 | — | Derrick Coleman (ROY) | Bill Fitch |
| 1991–92 | NBA | Eastern | 6th | Atlantic | 3rd | 40 | 42 | .488 | Lost first round (Cavaliers) 3–1 | | Bill Fitch |
| 1992–93 | NBA | Eastern | 6th | Atlantic | 3rd | 43 | 39 | .524 | Lost first round (Cavaliers) 3–2 | | Chuck Daly |
| 1993–94 | NBA | Eastern | 7th | Atlantic | 3rd | 45 | 37 | .549 | Lost first round (Knicks) 3–1 | | Chuck Daly |
| 1994–95 | NBA | Eastern | 11th | Atlantic | 5th | 30 | 52 | .366 | — | | Butch Beard |
| 1995–96 | NBA | Eastern | 12th | Atlantic | 6th | 30 | 52 | .366 | — | | Butch Beard |
| 1996–97 | NBA | Eastern | 13th | Atlantic | 5th | 26 | 56 | .317 | — | | John Calipari |
| 1997–98 | NBA | Eastern | 8th | Atlantic | 3rd | 43 | 39 | .524 | Lost first round (Bulls) 3–0 | | John Calipari |
| 1998–99 | NBA (Note: A lockout shortened the season to 50 games.) | Eastern | 14th | Atlantic | 7th | 16 | 34 | .320 | — | | John Calipari; Don Casey |
| 1999–2000 | NBA | Eastern | 12th | Atlantic | 6th | 31 | 51 | .378 | — | | Don Casey |
| 2000–01 | NBA | Eastern | 12th | Atlantic | 6th | 26 | 56 | .317 | — | | Byron Scott |
| 2001–02 | NBA | Eastern | 1st | Atlantic | 1st | 52 | 30 | .634 | Won first round (Pacers) 3–2; Won conference semifinals (Hornets) 4–1; Won conference finals (Celtics) 4–2; Lost NBA Finals (Lakers) 4–0 | Rod Thorn (EOY) | Byron Scott |
| 2002–03 | NBA | Eastern | 2nd | Atlantic | 1st | 49 | 33 | .598 | Won first round (Bucks) 4–2; Won conference semifinals (Celtics) 4–0; Won conference finals (Pistons) 4–0; Lost NBA Finals (Spurs) 4–2 | | Byron Scott |
| 2003–04 | NBA | Eastern | 2nd | Atlantic | 1st | 47 | 35 | .573 | Won first round (Knicks) 4–0; Lost conference semifinals (Pistons) 4–3 | | Byron Scott; Lawrence Frank |
| 2004–05 | NBA | Eastern | 8th | Atlantic | 3rd | 42 | 40 | .512 | Lost first round (Heat) 4–0 | | Lawrence Frank |
| 2005–06 | NBA | Eastern | 3rd | Atlantic | 1st | 49 | 33 | .598 | Won first round (Pacers) 4–2; Lost conference semifinals (Heat) 4–1 | | Lawrence Frank |
| 2006–07 | NBA | Eastern | 6th | Atlantic | 2nd | 41 | 41 | .500 | Won first round (Raptors) 4–2; Lost conference semifinals (Cavaliers) 4–2 | | Lawrence Frank |
| 2007–08 | NBA | Eastern | 10th | Atlantic | 4th | 34 | 48 | .415 | — | | Lawrence Frank |
| 2008–09 | NBA | Eastern | 11th | Atlantic | 3rd | 34 | 48 | .415 | — | | Lawrence Frank |
| 2009–10 | NBA | Eastern | 15th | Atlantic | 5th | 12 | 70 | .146 | — | | Lawrence Frank; Tom Barrise; Kiki Vandeweghe |
| 2010–11 | NBA | Eastern | 12th | Atlantic | 4th | 24 | 58 | .293 | — | | Avery Johnson |
| 2011–12 | NBA (Note: A lockout shortened the season to 66 games.) | Eastern | 12th | Atlantic | 5th | 22 | 44 | .333 | — | | Avery Johnson |
Brooklyn Nets
| 2012–13 | NBA | Eastern | 4th | Atlantic | 2nd | 49 | 33 | .598 | Lost first round (Bulls) 4–3 | | Avery Johnson; P.J. Carlesimo |
| 2013–14 | NBA | Eastern | 6th | Atlantic | 2nd | 44 | 38 | .537 | Won first round (Raptors) 4–3; Lost conference semifinals (Heat) 4–1 | | Jason Kidd |
| 2014–15 | NBA | Eastern | 8th | Atlantic | 3rd | 38 | 44 | .463 | Lost first round (Hawks) 4–2 | | Lionel Hollins |
| 2015–16 | NBA | Eastern | 14th | Atlantic | 4th | 21 | 61 | .256 | — | Wayne Ellington (JWKC) | Lionel Hollins; Tony Brown |
| 2016–17 | NBA | Eastern | 15th | Atlantic | 5th | 20 | 62 | .244 | — | | Kenny Atkinson |
| 2017–18 | NBA | Eastern | 12th | Atlantic | 5th | 28 | 54 | .341 | — | | Kenny Atkinson |
| 2018–19 | NBA | Eastern | 6th | Atlantic | 4th | 42 | 40 | .512 | Lost first round (76ers) 4–1 | | Kenny Atkinson |
| 2019–20 | NBA (Note: Regular season shortened due to COVID-19 pandemic.) | Eastern | 7th | Atlantic | 4th | 35 | 37 | .486 | Lost first round (Raptors) 4–0 | | Kenny Atkinson; Jacque Vaughn |
| 2020–21 | NBA | Eastern | 2nd | Atlantic | 2nd | 48 | 24 | .667 | Won first round (Celtics) 4–1; Lost conference semifinals (Bucks) 4–3 | | Steve Nash |
| 2021–22 | NBA | Eastern | 7th | Atlantic | 4th | 44 | 38 | .537 | Lost first round (Celtics) 4–0 | Patty Mills (SPOR) | Steve Nash |
| 2022–23 | NBA | Eastern | 6th | Atlantic | 4th | 45 | 37 | .549 | Lost first round (76ers) 4–0 | | Steve Nash; Jacque Vaughn |
| 2023–24 | NBA | Eastern | 11th | Atlantic | 4th | 32 | 50 | .390 | — | | Jacque Vaughn; Kevin Ollie |
| 2024–25 | NBA | Eastern | 12th | Atlantic | 4th | 26 | 56 | .317 | — | | Jordi Fernández |
| 2025–26 | NBA | Eastern | 13th | Atlantic | 5th | 20 | 62 | .244 | — | | Jordi Fernández |

== All-time records ==
As of the end of the 2025–26 regular season

| Statistic | Wins | Losses | W–L% |
|---|---|---|---|
| ABA regular season record (1967–1976) | 374 | 370 | .503 |
| NBA regular season record (1976–present) | 1,700 | 2,332 | .422 |
| All-time regular season record (1967–present) | 2,074 | 2,702 | .434 |
| ABA postseason record (1967–1976) | 37 | 32 | .536 |
| NBA postseason record (1976–present) | 70 | 101 | .409 |
| All-time postseason record (1967–present) | 107 | 133 | .446 |
| All-time regular and postseason record (1967–present) | 2,181 | 2,835 | .435 |
