= Les Hunter (basketball) =

American basketball player (1942–2020)

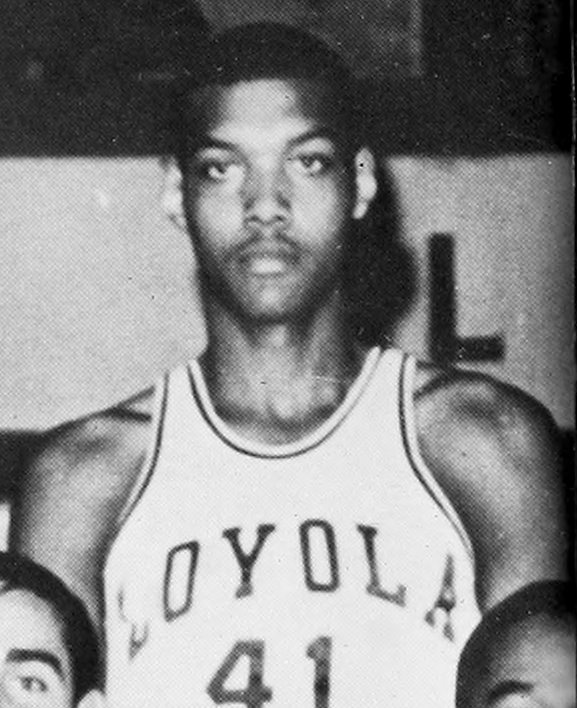
- Hunter in Loyola's 1963 yearbook

Personal information
- Born: August 16, 1942 Nashville, Tennessee, U.S.
- Died: March 27, 2020 (aged 77) Overland Park, Kansas, U.S.
- Listed height: 6 ft 7 in (2.01 m)
- Listed weight: 210 lb (95 kg)

Career information
- High school: Pearl (Nashville, Tennessee)
- College: Loyola Chicago (1961–1964)
- NBA draft: 1964: 2nd round, 9th overall pick
- Drafted by: Detroit Pistons
- Playing career: 1964–1973
- Position: Power forward
- Number: 41, 35, 40, 4, 30

Career history
- 1964–1965: Baltimore Bullets
- 1967–1969: Minnesota Muskies / Miami Floridians
- 1969–1970: New York Nets
- 1970–1972: Kentucky Colonels
- 1972–1973: Memphis Tams

Career highlights
- 2× ABA All-Star (1968, 1969); NCAA champion (1963); No. 41 retired by Loyola Ramblers

Career NBA and ABA statistics
- Points: 5,735 (12.3 ppg)
- Rebounds: 3,224 (6.9 rpg)
- Assists: 752 (1.6 apg)
- Stats at NBA.com
- Stats at Basketball Reference

Leslie Henry Hunter (August 16, 1942 – March 27, 2020) was an American professional basketball player in the National Basketball Association (NBA) and the American Basketball Association (ABA). Hunter played college basketball for the Loyola Ramblers and was the starting center on their NCAA championship team in 1963. He was a two-time ABA All-Star.

== Early life ==
Hunter was born in Nashville, Tennessee. A 6 ft 7 in (2.01 m) forward/center, Hunter attended Pearl High School and Loyola University Chicago. He played alongside Vic Rouse at Pearl High School and the two would later attend Loyola University together. Hunter and Rouse led Pearl to 54 consecutive victories and black national high school championships in 1958, 1959 and 1960.

== College career ==
At Loyola, Hunter was the starting center, of the team that upset the University of Cincinnati in overtime to win the 1963 NCAA Men's Division I Basketball Championship. Hunter and the other four Loyola starters played the entire game, without substitution. In a 1963 first-round Mideast Regional victory by Hunter and the Ramblers over Tennessee Tech, 111–42, remains a record margin of victory for an NCAA men's basketball tournament game.

In 1961–1962, as a sophomore, Hunter made his varsity debut and averaged 12.8 points and 8.7 rebounds, as Loyola finished 23–4 under Coach George Ireland and made the Final Four of the 12-team 1962 National Invitation Tournament (NIT) at Madison Square Garden in New York City.

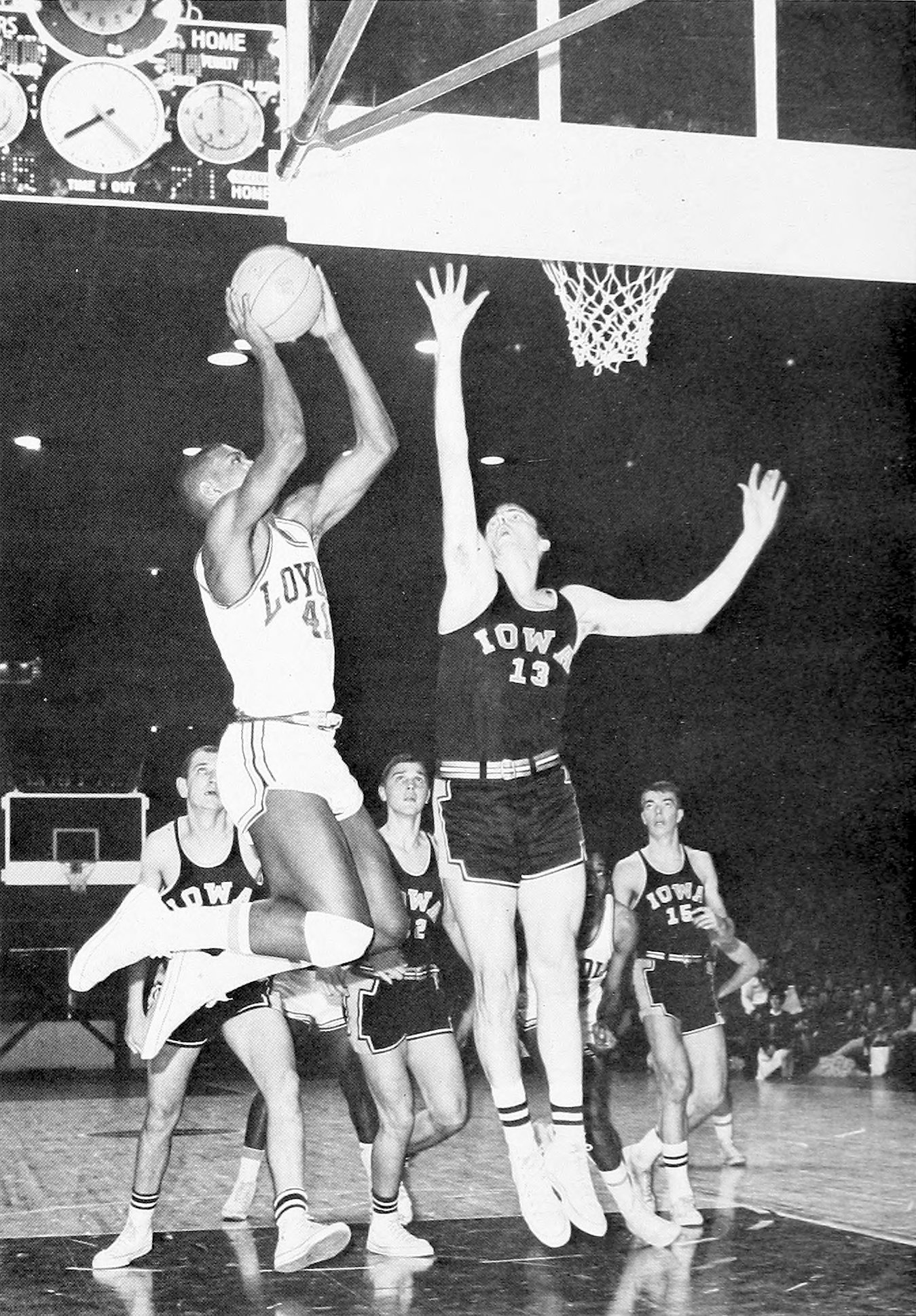
Hunter shoots a layup against Iowa on February 2, 1963.

As a junior in 1962–1963, Hunter averaged 17.0 points (on 53% shooting) with 11.4 rebounds, as Loyola finished 29–2 and captured the 1963 NCAA Championship. Hunter was second on the team to Jerry Harkness in scoring and Vic Rouse in rebounding. Hunter was named to the NCAA All-Tournament team. After playing well in victories over Tennessee Tech (111–42), Mississippi State with Bailey Howell (61–51), and Illinois (79–54), Hunter had 29 points and 18 rebounds in the Ramblers' 92–75 Semi-Final victory over Duke. Hunter then scored 16 points with 11 rebounds in the 60–58 overtime NCAA Championship game against Cincinnati and . In the championship game overtime, Rouse scored “The Shot Heard ‘Round the Basketball World,” as he rebounded a Hunter missed shot from 12 feet (after a pass from Jerry Harkness) and make the game-winning putback at the buzzer.

Hunter described the last moments: “See, I was going in to try and rebound Jerry’s shot, but he tricked me and threw me the ball, I had to stop and adjust my shot. It’s hard to make a jumper if you’re floating; the laws of physics dictate that. But Vic went up and tipped it in. Vic and I had played on the same team in high school,” he said. “I told him, ‘We stayed together just for this moment.' ”

In his senior year, 1963–1964, Hunter led Loyola to a 22–6 record, averaging 21.4 points and 15.3 rebounds, as the Ramblers made the 1964 NCAA University Division basketball tournament. Hunter had 13 points and 22 rebounds in a 101–91 win against Murray State and 25 points and 6 rebounds in a 84–80 loss to Michigan with Cazzie Russell and Bill Buntin. In his final game, the 3rd place Mideast NCAA Regional game, Hunter scored 27 points with 18 rebounds in a 100–91 victory over Coach Adolph Rupp and his Kentucky Wildcats.

In his varsity career at Loyola, Hunter led the Ramblers to a 74–12 record, scoring 1472 total points, with 1074 total rebounds. Hunter averaged a double-double of 17.1 points and 11.8 rebounds in his 86 career games.

== Professional career ==
Hunter was drafted by the Detroit Pistons with the 11th pick overall (2nd round) of the 1964 NBA draft.

On June 18, 1964, Hunter was traded by the Pistons with Bob Ferry, Bailey Howell, Wali Jones, and Don Ohl to the Baltimore Bullets for Terry Dischinger, Don Kojis and Rod Thorn. Hunter played for one season (1964–1965) in the NBA with the Bullets. He averaged 1.8 points and 2.4 rebounds in 4 minutes per game over 24 games.

In 1965–1966 and 1966–1967, Hunter played for the Twin City Sailors of the North American Basketball League (NABL). He averaged 23.1 points and 13.0 rebounds for the Sailors in 1966–1967.

Hunter was drafted in the American Basketball Association Draft (ABA) by the newly formed league and was signed by the Minnesota Muskies in 1967. He averaged 17.6 points and 9.6 rebounds in his first ABA season. Hunter had 7 points and 8 rebounds playing in the first ABA All-Star Game in January 1968. The Muskies finished 50–28 under Coach Jim Pollard, defeating the Kentucky Colonels 3–2 in the playoffs before losing to the eventual ABA Champion Pittsburgh Pipers 4–1 in the Eastern Division Finals, despite Hunter averaging 21.4 points in the playoffs.

Hunter scored 12 points with 6 rebounds in the 1969 ABA All-Star Game. He averaged 16.7 points and 9.6 rebounds and 1.6 points for the Miami Floridians in 1968–1969 as the original Minnesota franchise moved to Miami. The Floridians finished 48–35 under coach Pollard, defeating the relocated Minnesota Pipers 4–3 in the playoffs before losing 4–1 to the Indiana Pacers in the Eastern Division Finals, as Hunter averaged 11.7 points and 8.8 rebounds in the playoffs.

With the New York Nets in 1969–1970, Hunter averaged 16.4 points, 8.5 rebounds, and 2.7 assists, playing under Coach York Larese for the 39–45 Nets. Hunter averaged 16.1 points and 6.0 rebounds in a seven-game playoff series loss to the Kentucky Colonels.

Overall, Hunter played six seasons (1967–1973) in the ABA with the Minnesota Muskies (1967–1968)/Miami Floridians (1968–1969), New York Nets (1969–1971), Kentucky Colonels (1970–1972), and Memphis Tams (1972–1973). Overall, Hunter scored 5,735 points in his professional career and was a two-time ABA All-Star.

Hunter played in the first ABA All-Star game in 1968 in Indianapolis, Indiana alongside Hall of Fame inductees Larry Brown, Cliff Hagan, Mel Daniels, Louie Dampier, Roger Brown and Connie Hawkins.

Hunter averaged 12.8 points, 7.1 rebounds and 1.7 assists in his 444 career American Basketball Association games.

== Life after basketball ==
After retiring from basketball, Hunter moved to Kansas City in 1976. He owned a restaurant for ten years and worked as an instructor helping students who did not graduate take online classes to complete high school.

In 2018, Hunter was teaching math at a community college near his Overland Park home in suburban Kansas City, wearing a Loyola cap to class during the NCAA tournament. He died on March 27, 2020, from cancer at the age of 77.

== Awards and honors ==
- On July 11, 2013, in the Oval Office of the White House, Hunter and former Loyola teammates John Egan, Jerry Harkness and Ron Miller met with President Barack Obama to commemorate the 50th anniversary of the school's 1963 national championship. To date it remains the only NCAA Division I basketball championship won by a university from the state of Illinois.
- In September 2013, the entire 1963 Loyola Ramblers NCAA Championship basketball team was inducted into the Chicagoland Sports Hall of Fame.
- The 1963 Loyola Ramblers were inducted in the College Basketball Hall of Fame in November 2013, making it the first team inducted into the Hall of Fame.
- In 2016, Hunter and Pearl teammate Vic Rouse were inducted into the Metro Nashville Public Schools Sports Hall of Fame.
- 1991, Hunter was inducted into the Loyola Athletics Hall of Fame and his No. 41 was retired.

== Career statistics ==
Legend
GP	Games played	GS	Games started	MPG	Minutes per game
FG%	Field goal percentage	3P%	3-point field goal percentage	FT%	Free throw percentage
RPG	Rebounds per game	APG	Assists per game	SPG	Steals per game
BPG	Blocks per game	PPG	Points per game	**Bold**	Career high
*	Led the league

=== NBA/ABA ===
==== Regular season ====
Year	Team	GP	MPG	FG%	3P%	FT%	RPG	APG	PPG
1964–65	Baltimore	24	4.8	.281		.429	2.1	.5	1.8
1967–68	Minnesota (ABA)	75	34.0	.425	.118	.620	**9.8**	1.5	**17.6**
1968–69	Miami (ABA)	77	32.9	.444	.000	**.748**	9.6	1.6	16.7
1969–70	N.Y. Nets (ABA)	**79**	**36.2**	.433	.146	.734	8.5	**2.7**	16.4
1970–71	N.Y. Nets (ABA)	5	22.0	.359	–	.500	4.2	.4	6.4
1970–71	Kentucky (ABA)	75	18.9	.452	.204	.721	6.3	1.2	9.5
1971–72	Kentucky (ABA)	70	13.8	.478	**.313**	.701	3.2	1.3	6.7
1972–73	Memphis (ABA)	63	21.2	**.498**	.273	.704	4.8	1.5	9.1
Career (ABA)		444	26.5	.445	.199	.701	7.1	1.7	12.8
Career (overall)		468	25.4	.443	.199	.699	6.9	1.6	12.3

==== Playoffs ====
Year	Team	GP	MPG	FG%	3P%	FT%	RPG	APG	PPG
1968	Minnesota (ABA)	10	**38.8**	.404	.000	.633	**11.0**	**2.4**	**21.4**
1969	Miami (ABA)	10	20.9	.362	**.667**	.738	8.8	1.3	11.7
1970	N.Y. Nets (ABA)	7	33.3	.450	.300	.690	6.0	1.6	16.9
1971	Kentucky (ABA)	**19***	18.5	.387	.200	.616	4.6	1.7	9.3
1972	Kentucky (ABA)	6	20.5	**.537**	.333	**.818**	3.5	1.3	9.2
Career		52	25.1	.408	.286	.660	6.7	1.7	13.0
