= 1972–73 Kentucky Colonels season =

ABA basketball team season

- Head coach: Joe Mullaney
- Arena: Freedom Hall

Results
- Record: 56–28 (.667)
- Place: Division: 2nd (Eastern)
- Playoff finish: ABA Finals (lost to the Pacers 3–4)

Local media
- Television: WLKY 32
- Radio: WHAS

The 1972–73 Kentucky Colonels season was the sixth season of the Colonels out in the American Basketball Association. Despite finishing the season only one game short of leading the Eastern Division, being behind the revamped Carolina Cougars led by future Hall of Fame head coach Larry Brown, the Colonels would still manage to make it to the ABA Finals for the second time in three seasons after not just beating their stateside division rivals, the regional-based Virginia Squires, in five games, but also upset the Carolina Cougars in seven games, with them beating the regional-based Carolina squad on their home turf, which was played in Charlotte, North Carolina that night. Once they returned to the ABA Finals, the Colonels would see their stateside rivals, the defending champion Indiana Pacers, as opposed to having a rematch with the Utah Stars like it was back in 1971; while the Colonels would keep the series tight and have it go down to the wire, they ultimately lost to the defending champion Indiana Pacers in a tight seven-game series, making them the only ABA team to ever repeat as champions in the ABA. Following the season's end, the Colonels would fire head coach Joe Mullaney and replace him with former New Orleans Buccaneers/Memphis Pros and Dallas Chaparrals head coach Babe McCarthy in the hopes of overcoming their rivals to end up winning an ABA championship soon.

== ABA Draft ==
Weirdly enough, as of 2025, there has been no official draft records for the first five rounds of the 1972 ABA draft specifically, while every other round after that point has been properly recorded by basketball historians otherwise. Because of the strange dispersity of draft picks not being properly recorded this year after previously being fully recorded in the previous year's draft and the number of rounds potentially being off for even the players being selected this year, the recorded players selected in this year's draft will be marked with a ? for the pick number in particular in order to showcase the awkward display currently going on with the 1972 ABA draft year in particular (though what is known is that the Colonels would not draft within the first five rounds outside of them having the last pick of the first round in that draft (which officially became the #7 pick for the Colonels after being considered the #11 pick beforehand due to them having the best record in the ABA last season) due to the ABA having four different teams of theirs in the Memphis Pros, New York Nets, Virginia Squires, and Utah Stars all forfeiting their own first-round picks (originally at #2, #6, #9, & #10, respectively) due to them all obtaining a different player of interest some time after the 1971 ABA draft ended in a way that the ABA did not like seeing happen at all for various reasons). However, if any changes come up to where a proper, official recording of the 1972 ABA draft gets released displaying both pick numbers and round numbers for where certain players got selected, please provide the updated (potential) draft ordering with a source confirming the round and pick numbers included here.

Round	Pick	Player	Position(s)	Nationality	College
1	7	Corky Calhoun	SF	United States	Duke
6	53(?)	Mike Gantt	F	United States	St. Bonaventure
7	64(?)	Bill Kennedy	G	United States	Arizona State
8	75(?)	Terry Benton	F	United States	Wichita State
9	86(?)	Ernest Pettis	G	United States	Western Michigan
10	97(?)	Cleveland Hill	F	United States	Nicholls State
11	108(?)	Andrew Pettes	G	United States	Oklahoma
12	119(?)	David Hall	F	United States	Kansas State
13	130(?)	Jerry Clack	G	United States	Oklahoma State
14	141(?)	Tom Parker	F	United States	Kentucky
15	150(?)	Jerry Dunn	F	United States	Western Kentucky
16	159(?)	Frank Lorthridge	PF/C	United States	Pan American University

Interestingly, none of the players selected by the Colonels in this draft would end up playing for the franchise whatsoever, with only Corky Calhoun actually having a known playing career that had him spend time in the rivaling NBA instead of with Kentucky in the ABA.

=== ABA Dispersal Draft ===
Months after the original ABA draft for this year concluded, the ABA held their first ever dispersal draft on July 13, 1972, after it was found out by the ABA itself that neither "The Floridians" nor the Pittsburgh Condors would be able to continue operations either in their original locations or elsewhere in the U.S.A. (or even Canada in the case of "The Floridians"). Unlike the main draft they did during the months of March and April, this draft would last for only six rounds as a one-day deal and would have the nine remaining inaugural ABA teams selecting players that were left over at the time from both "The Floridians" and Pittsburgh Condors franchises (including draft picks from both teams there) and obtain their player rights from there. Any players from either franchise that wouldn't be selected during this draft would be placed on waivers and enter free agency afterward. Interestingly, only 42 total players were selected by the nine remaining ABA teams at the time of the dispersal draft, meaning everyone else that was available from both teams was considered a free agent to the ABA not long afterward. Not only that, but the Colonels would end up picking behind the New York Nets and Indiana Pacers with regards to select players from this particular draft despite them having the best record in ABA history last season since they didn't end up making it to the ABA Finals championship round this past season. With that being said, the following players were either Floridians or Condors players that the Colonels acquired during this dispersal draft.

Round	Pick	Player	Position(s)	Nationality	University	ABA Team
1	11	Walt Szczerbiak	SF	United States; West Germany	George Washington	Pittsburgh Condors
2	20	Ernie Fleming	F	United States	Jacksonville	The Floridians
3	28	Lonnie Wright	PG/SG	United States	Colorado State	The Floridians
4	36	Greg Flaker	G	United States	Missouri	The Floridians

Interestingly, none of the four players that the Colonels selected in this draft would play for them in Kentucky at all either. The first-round pick, the West German-born American Walt Szczerbiak (who was born in West Germany in a Ukrainian refugee camp), would end up playing for the Eastern Basketball Association and then play overseas basketball for the rest of his career once the Pittsburgh Condors folded operations after his rookie season ended. Every other selection Kentucky made would involve players that were on "The Floridians" franchise at the time of the dispersal draft, though the only notable player there that had some semblance of a professional basketball career would be former American Football League and Denver Broncos player Lonnie Wright, who decided to retire from playing basketball entirely after "The Floridians" folded operations and the dispersal draft concluded. Neither Ernie Fleming nor Greg Flaker would end up playing professional basketball once the dispersal draft concluded.

== Roster ==
1972–73 Kentucky Colonels roster
Players

Pos.	No.	Player	Height	Weight	DOB	From
SF	42	Bill Chamberlain	6 ft 6 in (1.98 m)	188 lb (85 kg)	December 16, 1949	North Carolina
PG	10	Louie Dampier	6 ft 0 in (1.83 m)	170 lb (77 kg)	November 20, 1944	Kentucky
PG	32	Mike Gale	6 ft 4 in (1.93 m)	185 lb (84 kg)	July 18, 1950	Elizabeth City State
C	53	Artis Gilmore	7 ft 2 in (2.18 m)	240 lb (109 kg)	September 21, 1949	Jacksonville
C	44	Dan Issel	6 ft 9 in (2.06 m)	235 lb (107 kg)	October 25, 1948	Kentucky
SF	4	Wendell Ladner	6 ft 5 in (1.96 m)	220 lb (100 kg)	October 6, 1948	Southern Miss
SG	30	Rick Mount	6 ft 3 in (1.91 m)	175 lb (79 kg)	January 5, 1947	Purdue
PG	3	Jim O'Brien	6 ft 1 in (1.85 m)	170 lb (77 kg)	April 9, 1950	Boston College
SG	15	Pierre Russell	6 ft 4 in (1.93 m)	190 lb (86 kg)	December 13, 1949	Kansas
SF	2	Walt Simon	6 ft 6 in (1.98 m)	200 lb (91 kg)	December 1, 1939	Benedict
PF	8	Ron Thomas	6 ft 6 in (1.98 m)	215 lb (98 kg)	November 19, 1950	Louisville
SF	24	Claude Virden	6 ft 6 in (1.98 m)	195 lb (88 kg)	November 25, 1947	Murray State

Coaches
Head coach

Joe Mullaney

Legend
- (DP) Unsigned draft pick
- (FA) Free agent
- (S) Suspended
- Injured

Roster

== Final standings ==
=== Eastern Division ===
Team	W	L	%	GB
Carolina Cougars	57	27	.679	-
Kentucky Colonels	56	28	.667	1
Virginia Squires	42	42	.500	15
New York Nets	30	54	.357	27
Memphis Tams	24	60	.286	33

== ABA Playoffs ==
ABA Eastern Division Semifinals

Game	Date	Location	Score	Record	Attendance
1	March 30	Kentucky	129–101	1–0	4,692
2	April 1	Kentucky	94–109	1–1	5,139
3	April 3	Virginia	115–113	2–1	9,621
4	April 6	Virginia	108–90	3–1	8,644
5	April 7	Kentucky	114–93	4–1	16,887

Colonels win series, 4–1

ABA Eastern Division Finals

Game	Date	Location	Score	Record	Attendance
1	April 11	Carolina	113–103	1–0	9,165
2	April 14	Carolina	105–125	1–1	5,103
3	April 16	Kentucky	108–94	2–1	10,422
4	April 18	Kentucky	91–102	2–2	16,238
5	April 20	Carolina	107–112	2–3	11,988
6	April 21	Kentucky	119–100	3–3	16,892
7	April 24	Carolina	107–96	4–3	10,231

Colonels win series, 4–3

ABA Finals

Game	Date	Location	Score	Record	Attendance
1	April 28	Kentucky	107–111 (OT)	0–1	12,119
2	April 30	Kentucky	114–102	1–1	13,408
3	May 3	Indiana	92–88	2–1	10,079
4	May 5	Indiana	86–90	2–2	9,498
5	May 8	Kentucky	86–89	2–3	16,779
6	May 10	Indiana	109–93	3–3	10,079
7	May 12	Kentucky	81–88	3–4	16,597

Colonels lose series, 4–3

== Awards and honors ==
1973 ABA All-Star Game selections (game played on February 6, 1973)

- Dan Issel
- Louie Dampier
- Artis Gilmore
- All ABA-First Team selections
  - Artis Gilmore
- All ABA-Second Team selections
  - Dan Issel
