= Dan Issel =

American basketball player, coach, executive (born 1948)

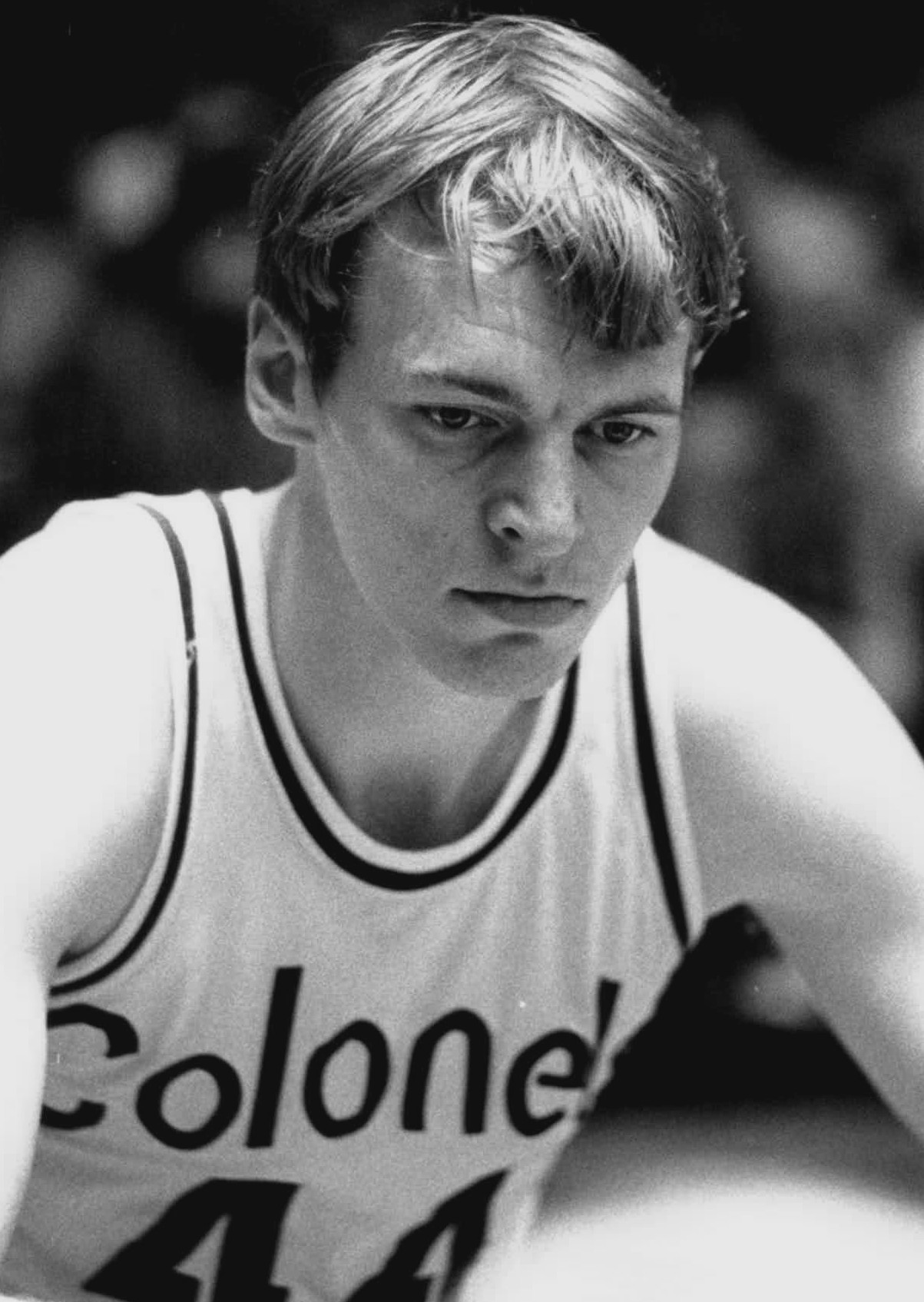
- Issel with the Kentucky Colonels in the 1970s

Personal information
- Born: October 25, 1948 (age 78) Batavia, Illinois, U.S.
- Listed height: 6 ft 9 in (2.06 m)
- Listed weight: 235 lb (107 kg)

Career information
- High school: Batavia (Batavia, Illinois)
- College: Kentucky (1967–1970)
- NBA draft: 1970: 8th round, 122nd overall pick
- Drafted by: Detroit Pistons
- Playing career: 1970–1985
- Position: Center / power forward
- Number: 44, 25
- Coaching career: 1992–1994, 1999–2002

Career history

Playing
- 1970–1975: Kentucky Colonels
- 1975–1985: Denver Nuggets

Career highlights
- ABA champion (1975); NBA All-Star (1977); 6× ABA All-Star (1971–1976); ABA All-Star Game MVP (1972); All-ABA First Team (1972); 4× All-ABA Second Team (1971, 1973, 1974, 1976); ABA Rookie of the Year (1971); ABA scoring champion (1971); ABA All-Time Team; No. 44 retired by Denver Nuggets; Consensus first-team All-American (1970); Consensus second-team All-American (1969)

Career ABA and NBA statistics
- Points: 27,482 (22.6 ppg)
- Rebounds: 11,133 (9.1 rpg)
- Assists: 2,907 (2.4 apg)
- Stats at NBA.com
- Stats at Basketball Reference
- Basketball Hall of Fame
- Collegiate Basketball Hall of Fame

Daniel Paul Issel (born October 25, 1948) is an American former professional basketball player and coach. He played college basketball for the Kentucky Wildcats, earning All-American twice en route to a school-record 25.7 points per game for his career. The American Basketball Association Rookie of the Year in 1971, he was a six-time ABA All-Star and a one-time NBA All-Star.

A prolific scorer, Issel remains the all-time leading scorer at the University of Kentucky, the second-leading scorer of all time for the NBA's Denver Nuggets, and the second-leading scorer of all time for the American Basketball Association itself. Upon Issel's retirement from the NBA in 1985, Wilt Chamberlain, Kareem Abdul-Jabbar, and Julius Erving were the only professional basketball players to have scored more career points. Issel was inducted into the Naismith Memorial Basketball Hall of Fame in 1993.

== Early life ==
Issel was born in Batavia, Illinois, son of Robert and Elanor Issel, and grew up with sister Kathi and brother Greg. Robert Issel owned and operated Issel Painting & Decorating. Issel attended Batavia High School, graduating in 1966 as an All-American playing for coach Don Vandersnick. Issel led Batavia to regional titles his last two years. As a senior, Issel averaged 25.8 points on Batavia's 26–3 team.

Growing up in Batavia, Issel's backyard was adjacent to his friend Ken Anderson’s backyard. Anderson became a National Football League quarterback with the Cincinnati Bengals and the 1981 NFL Most Valuable Player. Another Batavia High School teammate was future sports announcer Craig Sager, who was a freshman at Batavia when Issel was a senior. Said Issel of his Batavia teammates: “What Batavia instilled in all three of us — myself, Kenny, and Craig — was a solid work ethic."

According to Sports Illustrated, Don VanDersnick showed Issel how to dunk by training him with a volleyball and had Issel jump up and grab the rim 50 times each day at practice. Issel did not start for Batavia High's basketball team until he was a junior and considered himself fortunate that he had VanDersnick as his coach, saying, "If he'd told us that if we dove off a water tower it would make us better basketball players, there would have been a line waiting to do it."

== College basketball career ==
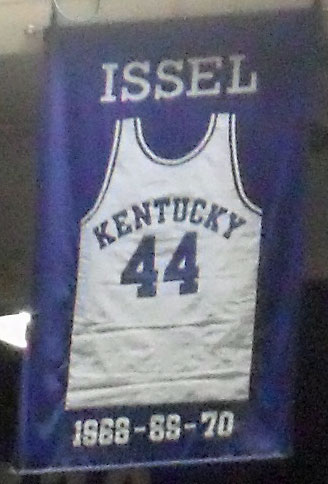
A jersey honoring Issel hangs in Rupp Arena

Issel was recruited by Northwestern, Illinois and Wisconsin, but he chose Kentucky. Issel then played college basketball at the University of Kentucky under legendary coach Adolph Rupp.

As a senior for the Wildcats, Issel averaged 33.9 points per game (36.0 in the NCAA Tournament) to help Kentucky reach the Elite Eight.

Issel was at the UK from 1966 to 1970 and scored 2,138 points (an average of 25.7 per game) and had 1,078 rebounds, while being named an All American for two of the three seasons he was eligible for the award. His career points total remains the highest among UK men's players.

According to Sports Illustrated Magazine, in a game early in Issel's Kentucky career, teammates were neglecting to give him the ball. Rupp called a timeout and said, "This guy is going to be Kentucky's all-time leading scorer by the time he's through here. I thought you might like to meet him."

On February 7, 1970, Issel scored 53 points in a 120–85 victory over Ole Miss, breaking Cliff Hagan's single-game record of 51. Issel's mark held for almost four decades, until Jodie Meeks scored 54 points against Tennessee on January 13, 2009. Issel also scored 51 at Louisiana State University on February 21, 1970, currently the third-best mark in school history.

Issel's career at Kentucky coincided with that of Pete Maravich at SEC rival LSU, who scored an NCAA-record 3,667 points (44.2 per game). Maravich and Issel finished 1–2 in SEC Player of the Year voting in each of their three seasons.

A three-year starter for Kentucky, Issel led his team to three Southeastern Conference titles and set 23 school records in his career.

== Professional basketball career ==
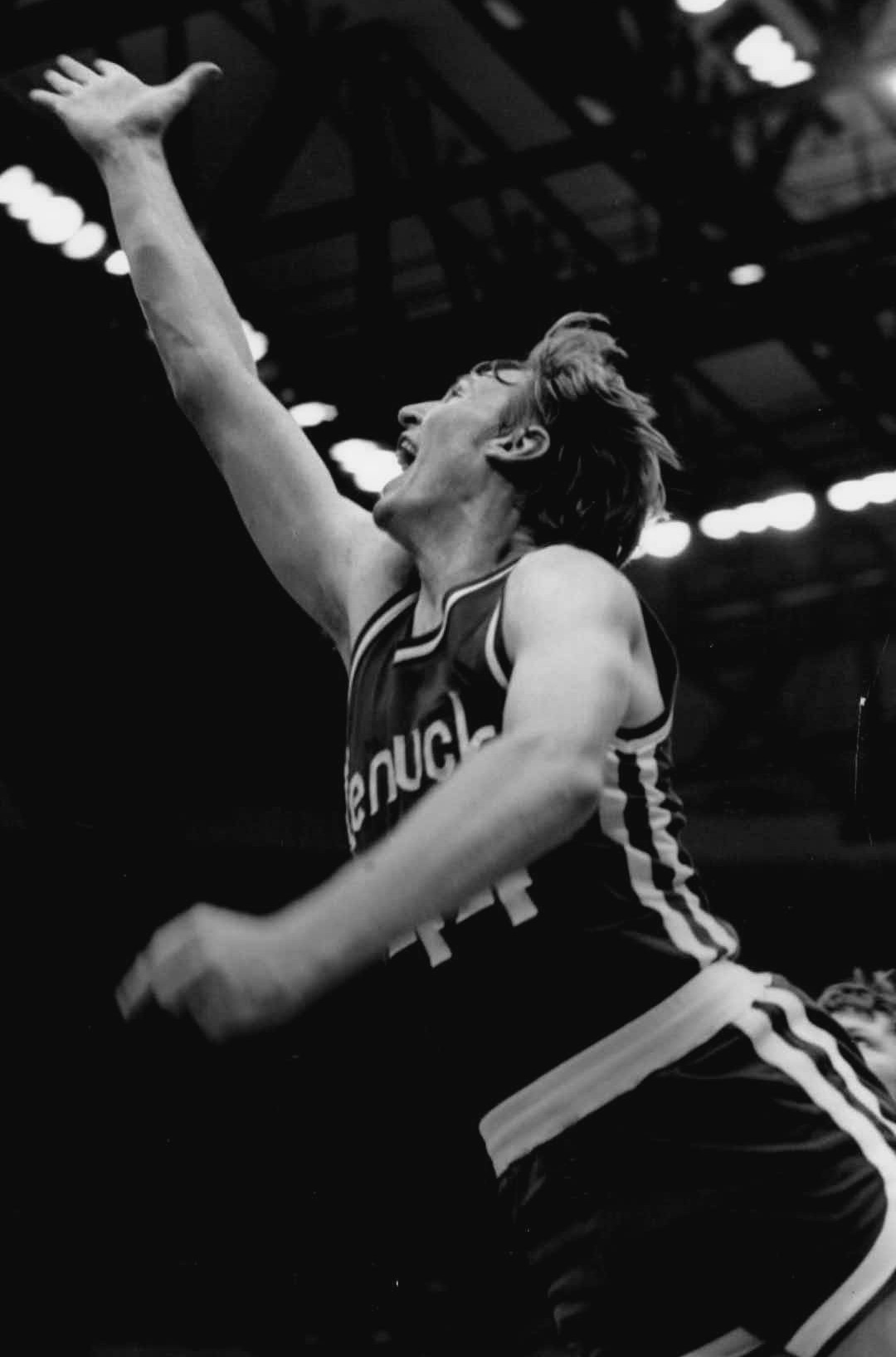
In his rookie season, Dan Issel led the ABA in scoring with 29.9 points per game, and also averaged 13.2 rebounds per game.

=== Kentucky Colonels (1970–1975) ===
Upon Issel's graduation in 1970, he was drafted by the Detroit Pistons (8th round) of the National Basketball Association and the Kentucky Colonels (1st round) of the American Basketball Association. Issel signed to play basketball for the Colonels and the ABA.

In his first season, Issel led the ABA in scoring with an average of 29.9 points per game, and pulled down 13.2 rebounds per game. He played in the 1971 ABA All-Star Game and was selected to the All-ABA Second Team. Issel shared ABA Rookie of the Year honors with Charlie Scott of the Virginia Squires. Issel's success did not stop there, en route to the Colonels' 1971 ABA Finals appearance that postseason, Issel averaged 28.1 points and 11.6 rebounds per playoff game. Despite these averages, the Colonels lost to the Zelmo Beaty-led Utah Stars in a closely contested seven-game series.

The following season, Issel played in 83 of 84 games and raised his scoring average to 30.6 points per game. He was named the MVP of his second All-Star Game for scoring 21 points and collaring nine rebounds. Issel made the All-ABA First Team of that season.

Helped by dominant 7'2" center Artis Gilmore, the 1974–75 Kentucky Colonels won the 1975 ABA championship, with key support from Issel and sharp-shooting guard (and fellow ex-Kentucky Wildcat) Louie Dampier. In Game 4 of the series, Issel led all scorers with 26 points. In six seasons, Issel led the league in total points three times (including a record 2,538 in 1971–72) and was an All-Star each year. Issel earned the reputation as a "shooter" by the middle part of his career, and he affirmed this, once stating, “Shooters are adrenaline junkies . . . Shooters would trade their first-born for a 50-point night. Shooters are addicted to reading their names in headlines. Shooters have themselves paged at K-marts just to hear their names over the loudspeaker. Shooters yank the cords of Venetian blinds just to experience the sound of singing nylon mesh.”

=== Denver Nuggets (1975–1985) ===
Issel's memorabilia on display at the Naismith Basketball Hall of Fame

Prior to the 1975–76 season, the Colonels traded Issel to the Baltimore Claws (formerly the Memphis Sounds) for Tom Owens and cash. The Claws folded before the season's start, and Issel was subsequently traded to the Denver Nuggets for Dave Robisch and cash. During his first season on the Nuggets, Issel and his new team finished with an ABA best 60–24 record and advanced to the ABA Finals, where he averaged 22.8 points and 12.8 rebounds during a contested six-game series loss.

For his ABA career, Issel was a 6-Time ABA All-Star, a 5-Time Member of the ABA All-Pro Team, the ABA's 2nd All-Time Scorer (behind Louie Dampier), was the 1972 ABA All-Star Game MVP, 1971 ABA Co-Rookie of the Year, Led ABA in scoring in 70–71 with 29.4 ppg and holds the ABA Record for most points in a season with 2,538 in 71–72.

Issel remained with the Nuggets following the ABA–NBA merger in June 1976, and represented Denver in the 1977 NBA All-Star Game. He remained productive, topping 20 points per game for five of his remaining eight years. Issel played a key role in helping the Nuggets make the postseason every year of his tenure, alongside (at various points) fellow stars David Thompson, Bobby Jones, Kiki Vandeweghe, and Alex English. On January 31, 1980, Issel scored an NBA career high 47 points, including making 19 of 23 free throw attempts, in a 127–126 win over the New Jersey Nets. On January 21, 1981, Issel grabbed an NBA career high 21 rebounds, while also scoring 32 points, during a 129–115 win over the San Antonio Spurs. During the 1984 NBA Playoffs, Issel averaged his highest postseason per game scoring average since his ABA days with 27.4 points per game during a 2–3 series loss against the Utah Jazz. Retiring following the 1984–1985 season, after the Nuggets were eliminated in the Western Conference finals by the Los Angeles Lakers, he received the NBA's J. Walter Kennedy Citizenship Award during his last season for his outstanding service to the community.

In nine seasons and 718 NBA games with Denver, Issel averaged 20.4 points and 7.9 rebounds per game. Wearing number 44, Issel is the Nuggets' second all-time leading scorer. He accumulated over 27,000 points in his combined ABA and NBA career, trailing only Kareem Abdul-Jabbar, Wilt Chamberlain and Julius Erving upon his retirement. Issel currently ranks #11 on the all time combined ABA/NBA scoring list. He missed only 24 games in 15 seasons, earning him the moniker, "the Horse". He was part of the Naismith Memorial Basketball Hall of Fame Class of 1993.

== Coaching career ==
After his playing career ended, Issel retired to his Courtland horse farm in Woodford County, Kentucky. He spent a year doing color commentary for Kentucky basketball games then became a Nuggets broadcaster from 1988 to 1992.

Even with no coaching experience, Bernie Bickerstaff recruited him as Nuggets head coach in 1992. In 1994, Issel led his team to the playoffs with their first winning record in four years, after only winning 44 games in the previous two years. That year, the Nuggets pulled off the biggest upset to that date in National Basketball Association (NBA) playoff history, knocking off the Seattle SuperSonics in five games (the first ever 8th seed to beat a 1st seed in the first round). He resigned 34 games into the 1994–95 season after facing criticism for his coaching style, saying the pressures of the job "have started to make me something I don’t want to be.”

Issel returned to the Nuggets in 1998 as president and general manager. He named himself head coach again in December 1999, yielding his general manager's title to Kiki Vandeweghe. His second tenure was far less successful than his first; the Nuggets did not post a winning season during this time. He was hampered in part by a drawn-out effort to find a new owner; two deals to sell the team collapsed at the last minute. Just before the start of the 1999–2000 season, he told reporters that there were several decisions he simply couldn't make due to the unstable ownership situation. In 2000, Issel faced a team mutiny after he criticized them following a winless four-game Eastern road trip. The Nuggets' team captains called a boycott of their next practice, prompting interest from CNN and other news outlets. The team saw some improvement later in the season, but missed the playoffs with a 40–42 record.

Issel's Nuggets tenure ended in December 2001. On December 11, after a close loss to the Charlotte Hornets, Issel heard a fan taunting him, as he walked off the court at the Pepsi Center. Issel taunted back, "Go drink another beer, you Mexican piece of shit." The incident was captured on Denver's NBC affiliate, KUSA-TV. The Hispanic Chamber of Commerce responded by stating that its members would boycott the team unless Issel was fired. Issel was suspended without pay for four games by the team. He publicly apologized the next day, and on Friday met with Hispanic chamber representatives, who accepted his apology. However, several members of Denver's Hispanic community thought the suspension was insufficient punishment and called for him to be fired. Hours before he was due to return, Issel took a leave of absence to decide whether he wanted to return. He accepted a buyout of his contract and resigned on December 26.

== Personal life ==
Issel's wife Cheri, whom he met at the University of Kentucky, is an accomplished artist. Cheri was a cheerleader at Kentucky. The Issels have two children, Sheridan and Scott.

Greg Issel, Dan's younger brother, was a star forward on Batavia teams in 1968 and 1969, following Dan. Greg Issel died suddenly of heart failure in 1998 at the age of 46.

In 2011, Issel served as executive director at the Bel Air Presbyterian Church in Los Angeles. As of 2014, he lived in Windsor, Colorado, and was employed in the oil and gas business.

In 2017, Issel served as a speaker at Batavia High School's gymnasium to honor a family friend, fellow Batavia classmate and national sportscaster Craig Sager, after Sager's death. Sager and Issel were basketball teammates at Batavia High School when Sager was a freshman and Issel a senior.

In February 2018, Issel became president of the Louisville Basketball Investment and Support Group, a Kentucky-based company founded in 2016 to pursue an NBA franchise.

== Honors ==
- Issel was inducted into the Illinois Basketball Coaches Association Hall of Fame in 1973.
- In 1985, Issel received the J. Walter Kennedy Citizenship Award.
- In 1985, Issel's jersey #44 was retired by the Denver Nuggets.
- Issel was inducted into the Colorado Sports Hall of Fame in 1987.
- In 1993, Issel was elected to the Naismith Memorial Basketball Hall of Fame.
- Issel was inducted into the University of Kentucky Athletics Hall of Fame in 2005.
- In 2006, Issel was inducted into the College Basketball Hall of Fame.
- Issel was inducted into the Batavia High School Hall of Honor in 2015.
- In 2018, Issel was inducted into the Kentucky Sports Hall of Fame.
- In April 2021, Issel joined local radio station ESPN Louisville to host Sports Talk with Dan Issel And Mike Pratt, airing weekdays from 10 to noon.

== ABA/NBA career statistics ==
Legend
GP	Games played	GS	Games started	MPG	Minutes per game
FG%	Field goal percentage	3P%	3-point field goal percentage	FT%	Free throw percentage
RPG	Rebounds per game	APG	Assists per game	SPG	Steals per game
BPG	Blocks per game	PPG	Points per game	**Bold**	Career high

†	Denotes seasons in which Issel won an ABA championship
*	Led the league

=== Regular season ===
Year	Team	GP	GS	MPG	FG%	3P%	FT%	RPG	APG	SPG	BPG	PPG
1970–71	Kentucky (ABA)	83	–	39.4	.485	.000	.807	**13.2**	2.0	–	–	29.9*
1971–72	Kentucky (ABA)	83	–	**43.0**	.486	.273	.785	11.2	2.3	–	–	**30.6**
1972–73	Kentucky (ABA)	**84***	–	42.0	.513	.200	.764	11.0	2.6	–	–	27.3
1973–74	Kentucky (ABA)	83	–	40.3	.480	.176	.787	10.2	1.7	.8	.4	25.5
1974–75†	Kentucky (ABA)	83	–	34.5	.471	.000	.738	8.6	2.3	.9	.6	17.7
1975–76	Denver (ABA)	84	–	34.0	.511	.250	.816	11.0	2.4	**1.2**	**.7**	23.0
1976–77	Denver	79	–	31.7	.515	–	.797	8.8	2.2	**1.2**	.4	22.3
1977–78	Denver	82	–	34.8	.512	–	.782	10.1	**3.7**	**1.2**	.5	21.3
1978–79	Denver	81	–	33.9	.517	–	.754	9.1	3.1	.8	.6	17.0
1979–80	Denver	82	–	35.8	.505	.333	.775	8.8	2.4	1.1	.7	23.8
1980–81	Denver	80	–	33.0	.503	.167	.759	8.5	2.0	1.0	.7	21.9
1981–82	Denver	81	81	30.5	**.527**	**.667**	.834	7.5	2.2	.8	.7	22.9
1982–83	Denver	80	80	30.4	.510	.211	.835	7.5	2.8	1.0	.5	21.6
1983–84	Denver	76	66	27.3	.493	.211	**.850**	6.8	2.3	.8	.6	19.8
1984–85	Denver	77	9	21.9	.459	.143	.806	4.3	1.8	.8	.4	12.8
Career		1,218	236	34.3	.499	.204	.793	9.1	2.4	1.0	.5	22.6
All-Star		7	1	24.7	.512	–	.731	6.9	2.3	.1	.1	14.7

=== Playoffs ===
Year	Team	GP	GS	MPG	FG%	3P%	FT%	RPG	APG	SPG	BPG	PPG
1971	Kentucky (ABA)	**19**	–	35.3	.505	–	.878	11.6	1.5	–	–	**28.1**
1972	Kentucky (ABA)	6	–	**44.8**	.412	.000	.760	9.0	.8	–	–	22.0
1973	Kentucky (ABA)	**19**	–	43.4	.497	.167	.795	11.8	1.5	–	–	27.4
1974	Kentucky (ABA)	8	–	38.9	.444	–	.848	10.9	1.8	.5	.8	18.5
1975†	Kentucky (ABA)	15	–	38.5	.467	–	.811	7.9	1.9	1.1	.8	20.3
1976	Denver (ABA)	13	–	36.2	.489	.000	.786	**12.0**	2.5	1.0	.6	20.5
1977	Denver	6	–	37.0	.510	–	.756	9.7	2.8	.8	.7	22.0
1978	Denver	13	–	35.4	.486	–	.862	10.3	**4.1**	.5	.2	20.2
1979	Denver	3	–	36.3	**.533**	–	.806	9.3	3.3	.0	.0	24.3
1982	Denver	3	–	34.3	**.533**	–	**1.000**	7.0	1.7	1.0	.3	25.3
1983	Denver	8	–	28.4	.507	.000	.862	7.3	3.1	1.1	.6	20.4
1984	Denver	5	–	30.6	.510	.500	.821	8.0	1.6	**1.2**	**1.2**	27.4
1985	Denver	15	4	21.7	.459	**1.000**	.813	3.6	1.8	.8	.3	12.4
Career		133	4	35.5	.487	.250	.822	9.4	2.1	.8	.6	22.1

== Head coaching record ==
Legend
Regular season	G	Games coached	W	Games won	L	Games lost	W–L %	Win–loss %
Playoffs	PG	Playoff games	PW	Playoff wins	PL	Playoff losses	PW–L %	Playoff win–loss %

=== NBA ===
Team	Year	G	W	L	W–L%	Finish	PG	PW	PL	PW–L%	Result
Denver	1992–93	82	36	46	.439	4th in Midwest	—	—	—	—	Missed playoffs
Denver	1993–94	82	42	40	.512	4th in Midwest	12	6	6	.500	Lost in Conference semifinals
Denver	1994–95	34	18	16	.529	(resigned)	—	—	—	—	—
Denver	1999–2000	82	35	47	.427	5th in Midwest	—	—	—	—	Missed playoffs
Denver	2000–01	82	40	42	.488	6th in Midwest	—	—	—	—	Missed playoffs
Denver	2001–02	26	9	17	.346	(resigned)	—	—	—	—	—
Career		388	180	208	.464		12	6	6	.500	

== See also ==
- List of NCAA Division I men's basketball players with 2,000 points and 1,000 rebounds
