= Joe Mullaney (basketball) =

American basketball player and coach

Personal information
- Born: November 17, 1924 Flushing, New York, U.S.
- Died: March 8, 2000 (aged 75) Providence, Rhode Island, U.S.
- Listed height: 6 ft 0 in (1.83 m)
- Listed weight: 165 lb (75 kg)

Career information
- High school: Chaminade (Mineola, New York)
- College: Holy Cross (1945–1949)
- NBA draft: 1949: 3rd round
- Drafted by: Boston Celtics
- Playing career: 1949–1950
- Position: Guard
- Number: 17
- Coaching career: 1954–1985

Career history

Playing
- 1949–1950: Boston Celtics

Career highlights
- ABA Coach of the Year (1974); 2× ABA All-Star Game head coach (1972, 1974); NCAA champion (1947)

Career statistics
- Points: 30
- Rebounds: None recorded
- Assists: 52
- Stats at NBA.com
- Stats at Basketball Reference

Joseph Alexander Mullaney (November 17, 1924 – March 8, 2000) was an American professional basketball player and coach.

== Biography ==
Mullaney was born on Long Island, New York. After graduating from Chaminade High School in Mineola he played college basketball at Holy Cross and with Bob Cousy was on the team that won the 1947 NCAA Championship. He played briefly for the Boston Celtics of the National Basketball Association (NBA).

=== College coaching career ===
After college, Mullaney was with the FBI before returning to basketball as coach at Norwich University in Vermont.

Mullaney became head basketball coach at Providence College in 1955. He coached the Friars until 1969, returning in 1981, remaining until 1985. Mullaney went 319-164 during his 18 seasons, a winning percentage of .660. Mullaney won the 1961 and 1963 National Invitation Tournament championships at Providence. Mullaney also took the Friars to the NIT four other times and into the NCAA tournament three times. His assistant and protégé at Providence, Dave Gavitt, went on to be a successful coach of the Friars, taking them to the 1973 Final Four and eventually help in the founding of the Big East Conference.

=== Coach of the Los Angeles Lakers ===
Mullaney left Providence in 1969 to coach the Los Angeles Lakers of the National Basketball Association, succeeding Butch van Breda Kolff who took the Lakers to the NBA Finals that year, losing 4–3 to the Boston Celtics.

In the 1969–70 season the Lakers overcame several injury problems and finished 46–36, two games behind the first-place Atlanta Hawks in the Western Division. Wilt Chamberlain was lost to injury early in the season and Elgin Baylor was also lost to injury later; both returned in time for the playoffs. En route to the NBA Finals they defeated the Phoenix Suns in the division semifinals and Atlanta in the division finals. The Lakers lost the NBA Finals 4–3 to the New York Knicks.

In the 1970–71 season the Lakers finished 48–34, first in the new Pacific Division. The Lakers defeated the Chicago Bulls in the conference semifinal but lost to the Milwaukee Bucks in the Western Conference Finals.

=== ABA coaching years ===
In 1971 Mullaney became the fifth coach of the Kentucky Colonels of the American Basketball Association, succeeding Frank Ramsey in 1971. Mullaney coached the Colonels for two seasons before Babe McCarthy succeeded him for the 1973–74 season.

In the 1971–72 season the Colonels finished with a record of 68–16, the best ever record in the history of the ABA, winning the Eastern Division. However, the Colonels lost the 1972 Eastern Division Semifinals to the 44-40 New York Nets, 4–2. Mullaney coached the East team to a 142–115 win in the ABA All Star game that season.

In the 1972–73 season the Colonels finished 56–28, good for 2nd in the Eastern Division. The Colonels beat the Virginia Squires 4–1 in the Eastern Division Semifinals, beat the Carolina Cougars 4–3 in the Eastern Division Finals, and lost the ABA Finals 4–3 to the Indiana Pacers.

After the 1972–73 season Mullaney left the Colonels to coach the Utah Stars. Mullaney was replaced in Kentucky by Babe McCarthy. Oddly, McCarthy and Mullaney both were named co-ABA Coach of the Year for the 1974–75 season.

During the 1973–74 season Mullaney coached the Utah Stars to a 51–33 record, finishing 1st in the Western Division. The Stars defeated the San Diego Conquistadors 4–2 in the 1974 Western Division Semifinals and the Indiana Pacers 4–3 in the 1974 Western Division Finals, losing the 1974 ABA Finals to the New York Nets 4–1. Mullaney coached the West in the 1974 ABA All-Star Game, losing to the McCarthy-coached East 128–112. Mullaney was replaced as coach of the Stars by Morris "Bucky" Buckwalter after that season in Utah.

During the 1974–75 season Mullaney coached the Memphis Sounds, finishing with a record of 27-57 and 4th place in the Eastern Division. Their season was ended by Mullaney's old team, the Kentucky Colonels, en route to the Colonels' 1975 ABA Championship.

At the start of the 1975–76 season, Mullaney was slated to have been the coach of the Baltimore Claws, but the team folded after three preseason exhibition games played against the Virginia Squires and Philadelphia 76ers of the NBA.

In December 1975, Mullaney became the new head coach of the Spirits of St. Louis. Mullaney took the helm in St. Louis a bit after the middle of the season after the team opened with a 20–27 record under coach Rod Thorn. Mullaney was the final coach of the Spirits of St. Louis, as by the end of the 1975–1976 season, the Spirits alongside the Kentucky Colonels were the only two ABA teams that survived throughout the entire 1975–76 ABA season that did not join the NBA in the ABA–NBA merger.

=== Post ABA career ===
After the 1975–76 season Mullaney coached the Buffalo Braves of the NBA. Mullaney was brought on board by the Braves' new owner, John Y. Brown Jr., who had previously had an ownership interest in Mullaney's old team, the Kentucky Colonels. Despite Adrian Dantley earning Rookie of the Year the Braves finished in 4th with a 30–52 record.

Mullaney coached in Italy and then for Brown University from 1978 through 1981.

== Death ==
Mullaney died of cancer in Providence, Rhode Island on March 8, 2000, aged 75. He is buried in East Greenwich, Rhode Island.

== NBA career statistics ==
Legend
GP	Games played	FG%	Field-goal percentage
FT%	Free-throw percentage	APG	Assists per game
PPG	Points per game	**Bold**	Career high

=== Regular season ===
Year	Team	GP	FG%	FT%	APG	PPG
1949–50	Boston	37	.129	.800	1.4	.8
Career		37	.129	.800	1.4	.8

== Head coaching record ==
=== NBA ===
Team	Year	G	W	L	W–L%	Finish	PG	PW	PL	PW–L%	Result
Los Angeles	1969–70	82	46	36	.561	2nd in Western	18	11	7	.611	Lost NBA Finals
Los Angeles	1970–71	82	48	34	.585	1st in Pacific	12	5	7	.417	Lost in Conference finals
Buffalo	1976–77	29	11	18	.379	4th in Atlantic	—	—	—	—	Missed playoffs
Career		193	105	88	.544		30	16	14	.533	

=== ABA ===
Team	Year	G	W	L	W–L%	Finish	PG	PW	PL	PW–L%	Result
Kentucky	1971–72	84	68	16	.810	1st in Eastern	6	2	4	.333	Lost in Division semifinals
Kentucky	1972–73	84	56	28	.667	2nd in Eastern	19	11	8	.579	Lost in ABA Finals
Utah	1973–74	84	51	33	.607	1st in Western	18	9	9	.500	Lost in ABA Finals
Memphis	1974–75	84	27	57	.321	4th in Eastern	5	1	4	.200	Lost in Division semifinals
St. Louis	1975–76	37	15	22	.405	6th in ABA	—	—	—	—	Missed playoffs
Career		373	217	156	.582		48	23	25	.479	
