= 1970–71 Kentucky Colonels season =

- Head coach: Gene Rhodes (10–5); Alex Groza (2–0); Frank Ramsey (32–35)
- Arena: Freedom Hall

Results
- Record: 44–40 (.524)
- Place: Division: 2nd (Eastern)
- Playoff finish: ABA Finals (lost to the Stars 3–4)

The 1970–71 Kentucky Colonels season was the fourth season of the Colonels in the American Basketball Association. University of Kentucky star Dan Issel was signed by the Colonels. Issel was given a 10-year contract worth $1.4 million, while playing all but one game in the whole season, leading to him being named Rookie of the Year, alongside averaging 29.9 points and 13.2 rebounds per game during the season. Despite a 10–5 record, Rhodes was fired during the season. After having business manager Alex Groza coach the team for 2 games, Frank Ramsey was hired to coach the rest of the season. In the Semifinals, the Colonels beat The Floridians in a four-game sweep. In the Eastern Division Finals, they beat the Virginia Squires in six games to reach their first ABA Finals. In the championship series, they lost to the Utah Stars in seven games.

Notably, this was the first season for the Colonels after rebranding from their original colors of chartreuse and white.

== Roster ==
1970–71 Kentucky Colonels roster
Players

Pos.	No.	Player	Height	Weight	DOB	From
SG	35	Darel Carrier	6 ft 3 in (1.91 m)	185 lb (84 kg)	October 26, 1940	Western Kentucky
C	25	Bobby Croft	6 ft 10 in (2.08 m)	200 lb (91 kg)	March 17, 1946	Tennessee
PG	10	Louie Dampier	6 ft 0 in (1.83 m)	170 lb (77 kg)	November 20, 1944	Kentucky
G	32	Tom Hagan	6 ft 3 in (1.91 m)	185 lb (84 kg)	January 29, 1947	Vanderbilt
PF	4	Dennis Hamilton	6 ft 8 in (2.03 m)	210 lb (95 kg)	May 8, 1944	Arizona State
C	8	Dan Hester	6 ft 8 in (2.03 m)	210 lb (95 kg)	November 8, 1948	LSU
PF	4	Les Hunter	6 ft 7 in (2.01 m)	210 lb (95 kg)	August 16, 1942	Loyola Chicago
C	44	Dan Issel	6 ft 9 in (2.06 m)	235 lb (107 kg)	October 25, 1948	Kentucky
PF	22	Jim Ligon	6 ft 7 in (2.01 m)	210 lb (95 kg)	February 22, 1944	Kokomo High School
SF	9, 24	Cincy Powell	6 ft 7 in (2.01 m)	220 lb (100 kg)	February 25, 1942	Portland
SG	33, 54	Mike Pratt	6 ft 4 in (1.93 m)	195 lb (88 kg)	August 4, 1948	Kentucky
SF	2	Walt Simon	6 ft 6 in (1.98 m)	200 lb (91 kg)	December 1, 1939	Benedict
SF	5, 50	Sam Smith	6 ft 7 in (2.01 m)	230 lb (104 kg)	January 27, 1944	Kentucky Wesleyan
F	42	Al Williams	6 ft 6 in (1.98 m)	200 lb (91 kg)	February 3, 1948	Drake
SG	3, 45	Howie Wright	6 ft 3 in (1.91 m)	185 lb (84 kg)	February 22, 1947	Austin Peay

Coaches
Head coach

Gene Rhodes / Alex Groza / Frank Ramsey

Legend
- (DP) Unsigned draft pick
- (FA) Free agent
- (S) Suspended
- Injured

Roster

== Final standings ==
=== Eastern Division ===
Eastern Division	W	L	PCT	GB
Virginia Squires *	55	29	.655	–
Kentucky Colonels *	44	40	.524	11.0
New York Nets *	40	44	.476	15.0
The Floridians *	37	47	.440	18.0
Pittsburgh Condors	36	48	.429	19.0
Carolina Cougars	34	50	.405	21.0

== ABA Playoffs ==
ABA Eastern Division Semifinals

Game	Date	Location	Score	Record	Attendance
1	April 2	Kentucky	116–112	1–0	3,182
2	April 4	Kentucky	120–110	2–0	3,881
3	April 6	Florida	102–120	2–1	4,126
4	April 8	Florida	117–129	2–2	4,268
5	April 10	Kentucky	118–101	3–2	4,996
6	April 12	Florida	112–103	4–2	4,478

Colonels win series, 4–2

ABA Eastern Division Finals

Game	Date	Location	Score	Record	Attendance
1	April 15	Virginia	136–132	1–0	4,250
2	April 17	Virginia	122–142	1–1	5,000
3	April 19	Kentucky	137–150	1–2	4,777
4	April 21	Kentucky	128–110	2–2	5,221
5	April 23	Virginia	115–107	3–2	10,013
6	April 24	Kentucky	129–117	4–2	12,822

Colonels win series, 4–2

ABA Finals

Game	Date	Location	Score	Record	Attendance
1	May 3	Utah	117–136	0–1	12,051
2	May 5	Utah	125–138	0–2	13,208
3	May 7	Kentucky	116–110	1–2	12,337
4	May 8	Kentucky	129–125 (OT)	2–2	9,863
5	May 12	Utah	127–137	2–3	13,260
6	May 15	Kentucky	105–102	3–3	11,793
7	May 18	Utah	121–131	3–4	13,260

Colonels lose series, 4–3

== Awards and honors ==
1971 ABA All-Star Game selections (game played on January 23, 1971)

- Dan Issel
- Cincy Powell
- ABA Rookie of the Year
  - Dan Issel (shared with Charlie Scott)
- ABA All-Second Team
  - Dan Issel (tied with Zelmo Beaty for the Center position)
