= Walt Simon =

American basketball player (1939–1997)

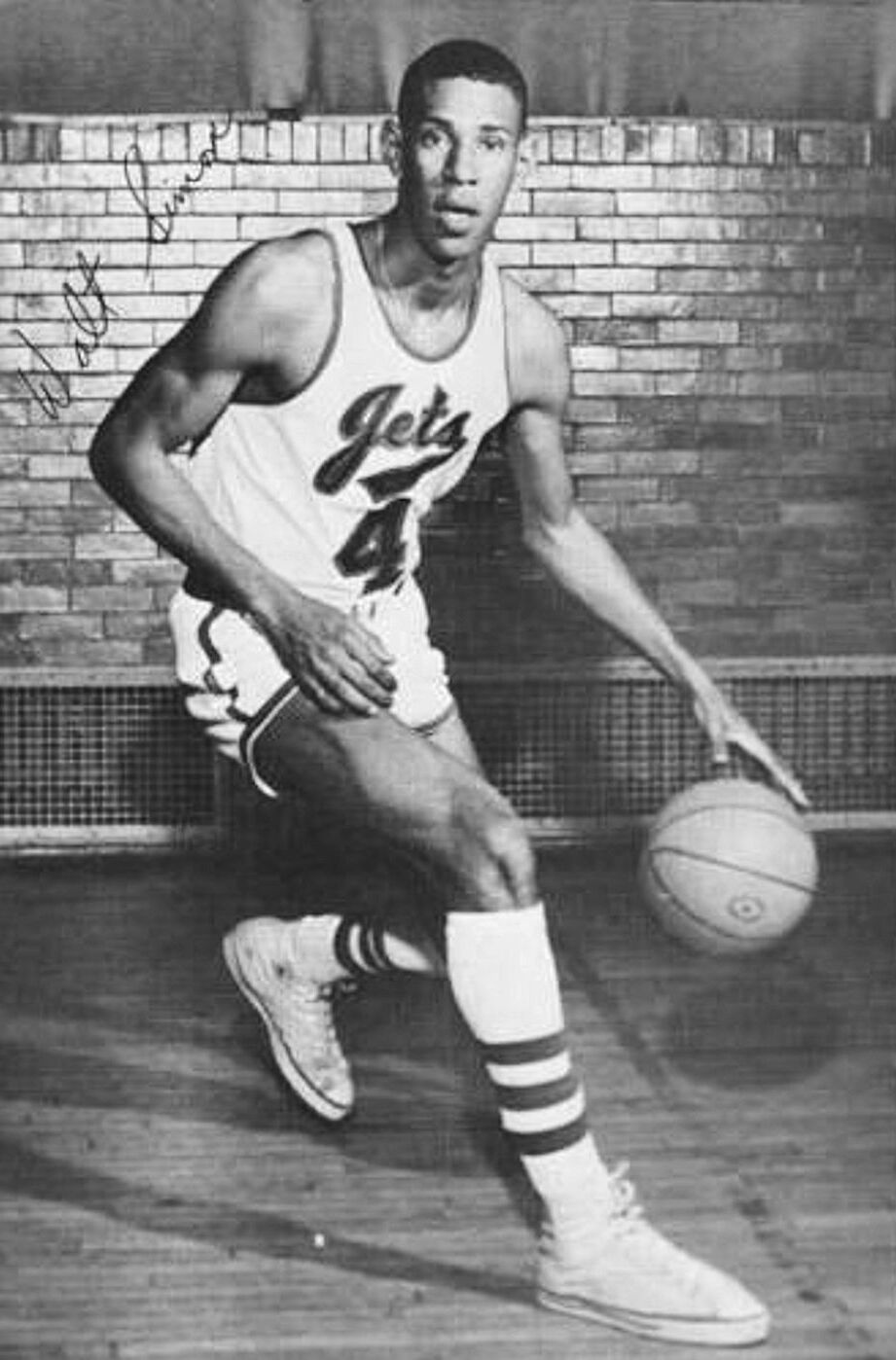
- Simon with the Allentown Jets in 1965

Personal information
- Born: December 1, 1939 Delcambre, Louisiana, U.S.
- Died: October 10, 1997 (aged 57) Louisville, Kentucky, U.S.
- Listed height: 6 ft 6 in (1.98 m)
- Listed weight: 200 lb (91 kg)

Career information
- High school: Commerce (New York City, New York)
- College: Benedict (1957–1961)
- NBA draft: 1961: undrafted
- Position: Small forward
- Number: 4, 2

Career history
- 1961–1967: Allentown Jets
- 1967–1970: New Jersey Americans / New York Nets
- 1970–1974: Kentucky Colonels

Career highlights
- ABA All-Star (1969); 3× EPBL champion (1962, 1963, 1965); EPBL Most Valuable Player (1965); All-EPBL First Team (1965); 2× All-EPBL Second Team (1964, 1967)
- Stats at Basketball Reference

Walter John Simon (December 1, 1939 – October 10, 1997) was an American basketball player. A 6'6" small forward from Benedict College, he played seven seasons (1967–1974) in the American Basketball Association for the New Jersey Americans/New York Nets and Kentucky Colonels. He appeared in the 1969 ABA All-Star Game, and he scored 6,414 career points. Simon is the only alumnus of Benedict College to play professionally at the ABA or NBA level.

Initially undrafted by the NBA out of college, Simon starred for six seasons in the minor league Eastern Professional Basketball League (EPBL) for the Allentown Jets before moving to the ABA. In the EBPL, Simon was named league MVP in 1964 and averaged 24.4 points and 9.4 rebounds per game over his 167-game EPBL career - leading the league in scoring once (1964–65) and finishing second in scoring twice (1963–64 and 1966–67). He won EPBL championships with the Jets in 1962, 1963 and 1965.

After retiring from basketball, he went on to work for John Y. Brown, Jr. (who had owned the Kentucky Colonels with his wife, Ellie Brown) at Kentucky Fried Chicken. Simon became the first black Vice President of a Fortune 500 Company.

Born in Delcambre, Louisiana, Simon left a wife, Marge Simon, and three children: Michael, Chris, and Geanai.

== Career statistics ==
Legend
GP	Games played	GS	Games started	MPG	Minutes per game
FG%	Field goal percentage	3P%	3-point field goal percentage	FT%	Free throw percentage
RPG	Rebounds per game	APG	Assists per game	SPG	Steals per game
BPG	Blocks per game	PPG	Points per game	**Bold**	Career high

=== ABA ===
==== Regular season ====
Year	Team	GP	GS	MPG	FG%	3P%	FT%	RPG	APG	SPG	BPG	PPG
1967–68	New Jersey	78		32.3	.453	.067	.635	6.7	2.7			13.3
1968–69	New York	68		**40.4**	.440	**.222**	.695	**8.1**	3.4			**21.1**
1969–70	New York	81		33.3	.441	.050	.749	5.9	3.6			14.3
1970–71	Kentucky	**84**		16.8	.474	.091	.641	3.8	1.9			7.7
1971–72	Kentucky	67		16.6	**.524**	.100	.699	3.5	2.0			8.9
1972–73	Kentucky	83		29.0	.482	.176	.749	4.8	**4.0**	**.8**	**.3**	12.2
1973–74	Kentucky	80		14.6	.474	.154	**.838**	2.6	1.5	.5	.1	6.6
Career		541		26.0	.462	.133	.704	5.0	2.7	.7	.2	11.9
All-Star		1	1	21.0	.727	–	.667	4.0	1.0			18.0

==== Playoffs ====
Year	Team	GP	MPG	FG%	3P%	FT%	RPG	APG	SPG	BPG	PPG
1970	New York	7	31.7	**.500**	.000	.821	**7.6**	3.0			**14.4**
1971	Kentucky	**19**	20.3	.452	.000	.694	5.1	2.7			9.2
1972	Kentucky	6	16.5	.410	–	.875	2.0	.5			6.5
1973	Kentucky	**19**	**33.6**	.444	.000	.871	4.9	**4.2**			11.1
1974	Kentucky	8	11.3	.400	.000	**1.000**	1.1	.9	.5	.4	3.8
Career		59	24.3	.449	.000	.788	4.5	2.7	.5	.4	9.4
