= 1973 ABA playoffs =

Basketball competition

Tournament details
- Dates: March 30 – May 12, 1973
- Season: 1972–73
- Teams: 8

Final positions
- Champions: Indiana Pacers (3rd title)
- Runners-up: Kentucky Colonels
- Semifinalists: Carolina Cougars; Utah Stars

The 1973 ABA playoffs was the postseason tournament of the American Basketball Association's 1972–73 season. The tournament concluded with the Western Division champion Indiana Pacers defeating the Eastern Division champion Kentucky Colonels, four games to three in the 1973 ABA Finals.

== Notable events ==
The teams with the three best records in the ABA that year failed to win the championship. The Carolina Cougars had the league's best record at 57–27 (.679), one game ahead of the Kentucky Colonels (56–28, .667) in the Eastern Division. The Utah Stars won the Western Division with a record of 55–29 (.655), four games ahead of the Indiana Pacers, who won the league championship after posting a regular season record of 51–33 (.607).

With the Pacers and Colonels meeting in the playoffs once again, the rivalry, referred to in some circles as the "I-65 Series" (referring to Interstate 65 that goes through the two states) heated up once again as they met in the ABA Finals. The Pacers became the first team to win a third ABA championship. The Colonels became the first team to lose two separate ABA championship series. The series also marked the second time in three years that the Colonels lost the ABA finals 4 games to 3; the same happened at the end of the 1971 ABA Playoffs against the Utah Stars.

Two years after the 1973 finals the Colonels and Pacers would meet again at the end of the 1975 ABA Playoffs with the Colonels winning the championship series.

The Pacers' George McGinnis was the Most Valuable Player of the ABA playoffs.

== Bracket ==
Division Semifinals
1	Utah Stars	4
4	San Diego Conquistadors	0
Western Division
3	Denver Rockets	1
2	Indiana Pacers	4
1	Carolina Cougars	4
4	New York Nets	1
Eastern Division
3	Virginia Squires	1
2	Kentucky Colonels	4

Division Finals
1	Utah Stars	2
2	Indiana Pacers	4
1	Carolina Cougars	3
2	Kentucky Colonels	4

ABA Finals
W2	Indiana Pacers	4
E2	Kentucky Colonels	3

== Division Semifinals ==
=== Western Division Semifinals ===
==== (1) Utah Stars vs. (4) San Diego Conquistadors ====
April 2

Box score

San Diego Conquistadors 93, Utah Stars 107
Scoring by quarter: 21–30, 23–19, 27–26, 22–32
Pts: Stew Johnson 22; Rebs: Red Robbins 8 Asts: Chuck Williams 8	Pts: Ron Boone 27; Rebs: Gerald Govan 15; Asts: Ron Boone 8
Utah leads series, 1–0

Salt Palace, Salt Lake City, Utah
Attendance: 7,268

April 4

Box score

San Diego Conquistadors 92, Utah Stars 103
Scoring by quarter: 23–34, 26–19, 26–26, 17–24
Pts: Chuck Williams 23; Rebs: Red Robbins 17; Asts: Taylor, Williams 5 each	Pts: Willie Wise 29; Rebs: Gerald Govan 14; Asts: Willie Wise 5
Utah leads series, 2–0

Salt Palace, Salt Lake City, Utah
Attendance: 7,271

April 7

Box score

Utah Stars 97, San Diego Conquistadors 96
Scoring by quarter: 24–20, 24–27, 19–26, 30–23
Pts: Willie Wise 24; Rebs: Zelmo Beaty 11; Asts: Willie Wise 7	Pts: Ollie Taylor 22; Rebs: Gene Moore 15; Asts: Chuck Williams 5
Utah leads series, 3–0

Peterson Gym, San Diego, California
Attendance: 1,729

April 8

Box score

Utah Stars 120, San Diego Conquistadors 98
Scoring by quarter: 25–30, 32–19, 35–19, 28–30
Pts: Ron Boone 27; Rebs: Bob Warren 11; Asts: Wise, Boone 7 each	Pts: Stew Johnson 19; Rebs: Gene Moore 10; Asts: Stew Johnson 4
Utah wins series, 4–0

Peterson Gym, San Diego, California
Attendance: 1,394

==== (2) Indiana Pacers vs. (3) Denver Rockets ====
March 31

Box score

Denver Rockets 91, Indiana Pacers 114
Scoring by quarter: 24–29, 21–25, 18–31, 28–29
Pts: Byron Beck 25; Rebs: Byron Beck 13; Asts: Ralph Simpson 5	Pts: Roger Brown 20; Rebs: Darnell Hillman 9 Asts: Billy Keller 7
Indiana leads series, 1–0

Indiana State Fair Coliseum, Indianapolis, Indiana
Attendance: 7,051

April 1

Box score

Denver Rockets 93, Indiana Pacers 106
Scoring by quarter: 31–23, 19–25, 26–25, 17–33
Pts: Ralph Simpson 29; Rebs: Dave Robisch 12; Asts: Warren Jabali 6	Pts: Freddie Lewis 30; Rebs: Mel Daniels 23; Asts: Billy Keller 4
Indiana leads series, 2–0

Indiana State Fair Coliseum, Indianapolis, Indiana
Attendance: 7,235

April 3

score

Indiana Pacers 94, Denver Rockets 105
Scoring by quarter: 19–32, 23–23, 31–31, 21–19
Pts: George McGinnis 32; Rebs: Mel Daniels 13; Asts: Freddie Lewis 11	Pts: Dave Robisch 22; Rebs: Julius Keye 21; Asts: Al Smith 11
Indiana leads series, 2–1

Denver Auditorium Arena, Denver, Colorado
Attendance: 5,335

April 5

Box score

Indiana Pacers 97, Denver Rockets 95
Scoring by quarter: 21–32, 24–22, 26–23, 26–18
Pts: Mel Daniels 25; Rebs: Mel Daniels 11; Asts: Freddie Lewis 10	Pts: Ralph Simpson 41; Rebs: Dave Robisch 19; Asts: Al Smith 5
Indiana leads series, 3–1

Denver Auditorium Arena, Denver, Colorado
Attendance: 6,904

April 7

Box score

Denver Rockets 107, Indiana Pacers 121
Scoring by quarter: 26–32, 27–38, 24–33, 30–28
Pts: Dave Robisch 28; Rebs: Julius Keye 18; Asts: Al Smith 8	Pts: Donnie Freeman 30; Rebs: Mel Daniels 23; Asts: Billy Keller 10
Indiana wins series, 4–1

Indiana State Fair Coliseum, Indianapolis, Indiana
Attendance: 9,816

=== Eastern Division Semifinals ===
==== (1) Carolina Cougars vs. (4) New York Nets ====
March 30

Box score

New York Nets 96, Carolina Cougars 104
Scoring by quarter: 24–24, 21–29, 29–22, 22–29
Pts: Billy Paultz 26; Rebs: Billy Paultz 16; Asts: Bill Melchionni 9	Pts: Billy Cunningham 25; Rebs: Billy Cunningham 15; Asts: Billy Cunningham 9
Carolina leads series, 1–0

Greensboro Coliseum, Greensboro, North Carolina
Attendance: 4,725

March 31

Box score

New York Nets 114, Carolina Cougars 111 (OT)
Scoring by quarter: 30–20, 21–29, 19–24, 33–30, Overtime: 11–8
Pts: Johnny Baum 26; Rebs: George Carter 14; Asts: Taylor, Melchionni, Roche 3 each	Pts: Billy Cunningham 24; Rebs: Billy Cunningham 16; Asts: Mack Calvin 5
Series tied 1–1

Reynolds Coliseum, Raleigh, North Carolina
Attendance: 6,343

April 3

Box score

Carolina Cougars 101, New York Nets 91
Scoring by quarter: 29–33, 17–15, 27–25, 28–18
Pts: Mack Calvin 28; Rebs: Tom Owens 9 Asts: Mack Calvin 5	Pts: Brian Taylor 25; Rebs: Carter, Paultz 11 each Asts: Bill Melchionni 5
Carolina leads series, 2–1

Nassau Veterans Memorial Coliseum, Uniondale, New York
Attendance: 8,418

April 5

Box score

Carolina Cougars 112, New York Nets 108
Scoring by quarter: 25–31, 37–14, 28–37, 22–26
Pts: Billy Cunningham 29; Rebs: Tom Owens 10; Asts: Mack Calvin 6	Pts: George Carter 29; Rebs: Billy Paultz 13; Asts: Bill Melchionni 8
Carolina leads series, 3–1

Nassau Veterans Memorial Coliseum, Uniondale, New York
Attendance: 7,867

April 6

Box score

New York Nets 113, Carolina Cougars 136
Scoring by quarter: 24–36, 36–33, 20–38, 33–29
Pts: George Carter 25; Rebs: Jim Chones 12; Asts: Bill Melchionni 6	Pts: Tom Owens 26; Rebs: Tom Owens 15; Asts: Billy Cunningham 6
Carolina wins series, 4–1

Greensboro Coliseum, Greensboro, North Carolina
Attendance: 6,388

==== (2) Kentucky Colonels vs. (3) Virginia Squires ====
March 30

Box score

Virginia Squires 101, Kentucky Colonels 129
Scoring by quarter: 28–33, 24–29, 20–30, 29–37
Pts: Julius Erving 21; Rebs: Julius Erving 9 Asts: Fatty Taylor 5	Pts: Dan Issel 43; Rebs: Artis Gilmore 14; Asts: Mike Gale 6
Kentucky leads series, 1–0

Freedom Hall, Louisville, Kentucky
Attendance: 4,692

April 10

Box score

Virginia Squires 109, Kentucky Colonels 94
Scoring by quarter: 21–31, 35–23, 20–26, 33–14
Pts: Julius Erving 41; Rebs: Jim Eakins 14; Asts: Jim Eakins 5	Pts: Dan Issel 35; Rebs: Artis Gilmore 14; Asts: Artis Gilmore 6
Series tied, 1–1

Freedom Hall, Louisville, Kentucky
Attendance: 5,139

April 3

Box score

Kentucky Colonels 115, Virginia Squires 113 (OT)
Scoring by quarter: 28–27, 20–21, 28–22, 27–33, Overtime: 12–10
Pts: Dan Issel 31; Rebs: Dan Issel 18; Asts: Jimmy O'Brien 10	Pts: Julius Erving 35; Rebs: George Gervin 12; Asts: Jim Eakins 5
Kentucky leads series, 2–1

Norfolk Scope, Norfolk, Virginia
Attendance: 9,621

April 6

Box score

Kentucky Colonels 108, Virginia Squires 90
Scoring by quarter: 19–25, 30–22, 28–23, 31–20
Pts: Issel, Gilmore, Mount 22 each Rebs: Artis Gilmore 11; Asts: Jimmy O'Brien 8	Pts: George Gervin 23; Rebs: Jim Eakins 15; Asts: Julius Erving 5
Kentucky leads series, 3–1

Hampton Coliseum, Hampton, Virginia
Attendance: 8,644

April 7

Box score

Virginia Squires 103, Kentucky Colonels 114
Scoring by quarter: 32–29, 30–22, 21–31, 20–32
Pts: Jim Eakins 32; Rebs: Jim Eakins 12; Asts: Erwin Mueller 7	Pts: Dan Issel 27; Rebs: Artis Gilmore 15; Asts: Mike Gale 6
Kentucky wins series, 4–1

Freedom Hall, Louisville, Kentucky
Attendance: 16,887

== Division Finals ==
=== Western Division Finals ===
==== (1) Utah Stars vs. (2) Indiana Pacers ====
April 12

Box score

Indiana Pacers 107, Utah Stars 124
Scoring by quarter: 25–30, 27–27, 32–32, 23–35
Pts: George McGinnis 31; Rebs: Mel Daniels 14; Asts: Freddie Lewis 8	Pts: Willie Wise 29; Rebs: Zelmo Beaty 18; Asts: Ron Boone 9
Utah leads series, 1–0

Salt Palace, Salt Lake City, Utah
Attendance: 7,712

April 14

Box score

Indiana Pacers 116, Utah Stars 110
Scoring by quarter: 33–27, 26–31, 36–26, 21–26
Pts: Donnie Freeman 31; Rebs: George McGinnis 16; Asts: McGinnis, Daniels, Buse 5 each	Pts: Willie Wise 29; Rebs: Beaty Govan 11 each Asts: Ron Boone 7
Series tied, 1–1

Salt Palace, Salt Lake City, Utah
Attendance: 12,233

April 16

Box score

Utah Stars 108, Indiana Pacers 118
Scoring by quarter: 27–23, 23–24, 27–36, 31–35
Pts: Zelmo Beaty 27; Rebs: Willie Wise 15; Asts: Wise, Govan, Jones 3 each	Pts: George McGinnis 31; Rebs: George McGinnis 17; Asts: Billy Keller 4
Indiana leads series, 2–1

Indiana State Fair Coliseum, Indianapolis, Indiana
Attendance: 9,353

April 18

Box score

Utah Stars 104, Indiana Pacers 103
Scoring by quarter: 29–23, 24–33, 28–24, 23–23
Pts: Jimmy Jones 34; Rebs: Zelmo Beaty 11; Asts: Jimmy Jones 6	Pts: George McGinnis 36; Rebs: George McGinnis 18; Asts: Billy Keller 7
Series tied, 2–2

Indiana State Fair Coliseum, Indianapolis, Indiana
Attendance: 10,079

April 19

Box score

Indiana Pacers 104, Utah Stars 102
Scoring by quarter: 29–28, 29–32, 26–24, 20–18
Pts: Mel Daniels 23; Rebs: Darnell Hillman 19; Asts: Darnell Hillman 6	Pts: Willie Wise 34; Rebs: Zelmo Beaty 13; Asts: Gerald Govan 6
Indiana leads series, 3–2

Salt Palace, Salt Lake City, Utah
Attendance: 12,453

April 21

Box score

Utah Stars 98, Indiana Pacers 107
Scoring by quarter: 21–29, 32–26, 18–27, 27–25
Pts: Willie Wise 17; Rebs: Gerald Govan 12; Asts: Govan, Warren, Jones 4 each	Pts: George McGinnis 23; Rebs: Mel Daniels 17; Asts: Freddie Lewis 7
Indiana wins series, 4–2

Indiana State Fair Coliseum, Indianapolis, Indiana
Attendance: 9,529

=== Eastern Division Finals ===
==== (1) Carolina Cougars vs. (2) Kentucky Colonels ====
April 11

Box score

Kentucky Colonels 113, Carolina Cougars 103
Scoring by quarter: 31–35, 25–17, 29–28, 28–23
Pts: Rick Mount 31; Rebs: Dan Issel 12; Asts: Walt Simon 7	Pts: Billy Cunningham 25; Rebs: Tom Owens 16; Asts: Billy Cunningham 6
Kentucky leads series, 1–0

Charlotte Coliseum, Charlotte, North Carolina
Attendance: 9,165

April 14

Box score

Kentucky Colonels 105, Carolina Cougars 125
Scoring by quarter: 23–29, 21–26, 30–36, 31–34
Pts: Rick Mount 29; Rebs: Artis Gilmore 11; Asts: Mike Gale 7	Pts: Billy Cunningham 27; Rebs: Billy Cunningham 15; Asts: Billy Cunningham 9
Series tied, 1–1

Greensboro Coliseum, Greensboro, North Carolina
Attendance: 5,103

April 16

Box score

Carolina Cougars 94, Kentucky Colonels 108
Scoring by quarter: 20–29, 25–28, 24–20, 25–31
Pts: Tom Owens 17; Rebs: Tom Owens 10; Asts: Joe Caldwell 7	Pts: Dan Issel 34; Rebs: Artis Gilmore 15; Asts: Simon, Gale 5 each
Kentucky leads series, 2–1

Freedom Hall, Louisville, Kentucky
Attendance: 10,422

April 18

Box score

Carolina Cougars 102, Kentucky Colonels 91
Scoring by quarter: 31–21, 22–29, 25–20, 24–21
Pts: Billy Cunningham 32; Rebs: Tom Owens 17; Asts: Mack Calvin 6	Pts: Dan Issel 31; Rebs: Dan Issel 15; Asts: Jim O'Brien 5
Series tied, 2–2

Freedom Hall, Louisville, Kentucky
Attendance: 16,238

April 20

Box score

Kentucky Colonels 107, Carolina Cougars 112
Scoring by quarter: 23–31, 29–18, 33–34, 22–29
Pts: Dan Issel 36; Rebs: Dan Issel 12; Asts: Dampier, O'Brien 5 each	Pts: Billy Cunningham 30; Rebs: Billy Cunningham 15; Asts: Billy Cunningham 5
Carolina leads series, 3–2

Greensboro Coliseum, Greensboro, North Carolina
Attendance: 11,988

April 21

Box score

Carolina Cougars 100, Kentucky Colonels 119
Scoring by quarter: 20–29, 28–26, 26–31, 26–33
Pts: Billy Cunningham 26; Rebs: Billy Cunningham 20; Asts: Mack Calvin 5	Pts: Rick Mount 25; Rebs: Artis Gilmore 16; Asts: Walt Simon 8
Series tied, 3–3

Freedom Hall, Louisville, Kentucky
Attendance: 16,892

April 24

Box score

Kentucky Colonels 107, Carolina Cougars 96
Scoring by quarter: 26–18, 24–27, 28–16, 29–35
Pts: Dan Issel 31; Rebs: Dan Issel 17; Asts: Simon, Dampier, Mount 3 each	Pts: Cunningham, Jones, Calvin 16 each Rebs: Tom Owens 16; Asts: Billy Cunningham 3
Kentucky wins series, 4–3

Charlotte Coliseum, Charlotte, North Carolina
Attendance: 10,231

== ABA Finals: (E2) Kentucky Colonels vs. (W2) Indiana Pacers ==
April 28

Box score

Indiana Pacers 111, Kentucky Colonels 107 (OT)
Scoring by quarter: 38–19, 27–32, 14–34, 21–15, Overtime: 11–7
Pts: Freddie Lewis 29; Rebs: Mel Daniels 14; Asts: Freddie Lewis 13	Pts: Dan Issel 33; Rebs: Dan Issel 20; Asts: Jim O'Brien 8
Indiana leads series, 1–0

Freedom Hall, Louisville, Kentucky
Attendance: 12,119
Referees: Norm Drucker, Ed Middleton

This was the third time that the Pacers and Colonels played each other in a postseason series, having previously played each other in 1969 and 1970. Indiana dominated most of the first half to lead by 14 but the Colonels scored the first 17 points of the second half to take a lead that would change hands several times. A contentious second half saw the Colonels play a chunk of it under protest after a scoring play by Artis Gilmore was disallowed on a three-second violation. With the Pacers trailing 100–97, Roger Brown shot a three-pointer to tie the game with 1:09 left. With seconds to play, Jimmy O'Brien missed a shot and got the rebound to shoot what seemed to be a successful shot with 35 seconds to go that would have made it 102–100 for the Colonels. However, the referees ruled that the 30-second shot clock had expired and gave the ball back to Indiana, with an apparent television replay being reported as showing the first shot having hit the backboard but not the rim. The Kentucky crowd showered the court with debris as fans scuffled with Pacer players after the game ended. At any rate, the game went into overtime that saw the Pacers take the lead late with Freddie Lewis making a driving jump shot to give Indiana a 109–107 lead before recovering a subsequent missed Colonel shot and being fouled that saw him make both shots to close the scoring.

April 30

Box score

Indiana Pacers 102, Kentucky Colonels 114
Scoring by quarter: 23–28, 24–29, 33–22, 22–35
Pts: George McGinnis 28; Rebs: Mel Daniels 16; Asts: Mel Daniels 4	Pts: Artis Gilmore 29; Rebs: Artis Gilmore 26; Asts: Jim O'Brien 10
Series tied, 1–1

Freedom Hall, Louisville, Kentucky
Attendance: 13,408

The Colonels dominated the first half with a ten-point lead before Indiana narrowed it to one in under four minutes that saw the two teams trade points until Indiana briefly had the lead 80–79 on a 11–0 run. However, the Colonels took control from there, with Walt Simon making two early baskets to give Kentucky the lead before continuing to build their lead. Artis Gilmore led the game in scoring with 29 points with 11-of-16 shooting while getting 26 rebounds and blocking seven shots while battling a pulled back muscle he re-injured in warmups.

May 3

Box score

Kentucky Colonels 92, Indiana Pacers 88
Scoring by quarter: 26–14, 18–26, 22–27, 26–21
Pts: Artis Gilmore 28; Rebs: Artis Gilmore 16; Asts: Gilmore, Mount, Simon 6 each	Pts: Mel Daniels 21; Rebs: George McGinnis 17; Asts: Freddie Lewis 8
Kentucky leads series, 2–1

Indiana State Fair Coliseum, Indianapolis, Indiana
Attendance: 10,079

A tough first quarter saw Kentucky lead 17–5 with one successful field goal in the first four minutes for Indiana before the Pacers eventually battled back to be trailing by just four points at halftime. Indiana took control in the third period and even led 65–59 at one point, but Kentucky took control from there and had the lead for most of the fourth quarter. Kentucky led by as much as 12 before Indiana made one last effort to get it to three points with under 90 seconds to play. With a missed shot by Rick Mount, the Pacers tried to get the ball to George McGinnis down two with under 30 seconds to go, but Gilmore stole the ball and got it to his teammate before Mount was fouled with time expiring that saw him finish the game with free throws made to give Kentucky a four-point win. Indiana out-rebounded Kentucky (66–42) but shot for 31-of-92 (33 percent) while the Colonels made 37-of-85 (43 percent).

May 5

Box score

Kentucky Colonels 86, Indiana Pacers 90
Scoring by quarter: 22–29, 23–19, 27–26, 16–16
Pts: Dan Issel 21; Rebs: Dan Issel 15; Asts: Walt Simon 4	Pts: George McGinnis 20; Rebs: Darnell Hillman 18; Asts: Freddie Lewis 6
Series tied, 2–2

Indiana State Fair Coliseum, Indianapolis, Indiana
Attendance: 9,498
Referees: Joe Gushue, Wally Rooney

Both teams battled a physical game that saw Indiana lead 48–45. Head coach Bobby Leonard was ejected at halftime after receiving his second technical foul when words he spoke to Freddie Lewis were misconstrued by referee Joe Gushue as directed at him. With no assistant coach, Gus Johnson served as the coach for the rest of the game. Kentucky led early in the third period by four, but the Pacers kept up with the Colonels, with multiple lead changes occurring in the third quarter before Indiana took the lead for good on a Don Buse layup to make it 72–70. Indiana never trailed after that, even leading by seven before the Colonels threatened with under five minutes to go to get it to two. Hillman then scored a shot and free throws to give the Pacers a six-point lead again as the Pacers held on to tie the series. Indiana managed to shoot over 40 percent from the field (37-of-85) while Kentucky was just 37 percent on 34-of-91; after the game, Leonard called the next couple of games ones to "go to war".

May 8

Box score

Indiana Pacers 89, Kentucky Colonels 86
Scoring by quarter: 19–24, 23–18, 20–22, 27–22
Pts: Freddie Lewis 31; Rebs: Mel Daniels 20; Asts: Daniels, Freeman 3 each	Pts: Dan Issel 31; Rebs: Artis Gilmore 17; Asts: Artis Gilmore 11
Indiana lead series 3–2

Freedom Hall, Louisville, Kentucky
Attendance: 16,779
Referees: John Vanak, Ed Middleton

Freddie Lewis scored 28 of his 31 points in the second half as the Pacers took a nine-point lead with under nine minutes to go. But Kentucky stormed back with a 19–5 run (emphasized by a Louie Dampier three-pointer to tie it) that saw them lead 85–80 with under two minutes to go. George McGinnis soon got fouled by Artis Gilmore (his sixth foul) that saw him make both free throws before Freddie Lewis subsequently got the ball and made it from the three-line. Kentucky got the ball and tried to run it down, but Walt Simon missed his 16-ft shot that saw Indiana rebound it with 0:48 to go. On the inbound play, Lewis tried to get the ball to McGinnis, but the ball went out of bounds with under 30 seconds to play. On the Kentucky inbound, McGinnis would bat the pass away and picked it up for what became a slam dunk to give Indiana an 87–86 lead with 0:23 to play. Jim O'Brien missed a shot for Kentucky that saw Mel Daniels fouled on the rebound. Lewis was then fouled on the inbound play that sent him to the free-throw line that saw him make both with under five seconds to go.

May 10

Box score

Kentucky Colonels 109, Indiana Pacers 93
Scoring by quarter: 28–24, 27–19, 25–33, 29–17
Pts: Artis Gilmore 29; Rebs: Artis Gilmore 21; Asts: Louie Dampier 7	Pts: George McGinnis 26; Rebs: George McGinnis 15; Asts: Donnie Freeman 7
Series tied, 3–3

Indiana State Fair Coliseum, Indianapolis, Indiana
Attendance: 10,079

Kentucky took control of the first half for a twelve-point lead that had fans thinking the team would possibly not enjoy the cases of champagne wheeled through the Coliseum for a potential series victory for the Pacers. Once trailing 70–58 in the third, Indiana pulled within two late in the third quarter, but the Colonels dominated from there, turning a 78–76 lead to 88–76 as the Colonels staved off elimination and sent the series back home to Louisville.

May 12

Box score

Indiana Pacers 88, Kentucky Colonels 81
Scoring by quarter: 24–18, 18–23, 24–11, 22–29
Pts: George McGinnis 27; Rebs: Darnell Hillman 13; Asts: Freeman, Brown, Keller each	Pts: Artis Gilmore 19; Rebs: Artis Gilmore 17; Asts: Dan Issel 4
Indiana wins series 4–3

Freedom Hall, Louisville, Kentucky
Attendance: 16,597

After leading by one point at halftime, Indiana pounced on Kentucky's weak third quarter (where they went three of 22 for just eleven points), with George McGinnis scoring 13 of his 27 points in that quarter that the Colonels could not recover from. It was the last game for Gus Johnson, who recorded seven rebounds and played late defense against Artis Gilmore.

Four members of the Pacers eventually made the Naismith Basketball Hall of Fame: Gus Johnson (2010), Mel Daniels (2012), Roger Brown (2013), and George McGinnis (2017), to go along with head coach Bobby Leonard (2014) while the Colonels saw three players inducted in Dan Issel (1993), Artis Gilmore (2011), and Louie Dampier (2015).

In July, the Colonels lost both their general manager (Mike Storen) and head coach (Joe Mullaney), who each resigned; on July 24, Mullaney promptly signed a contract to coach the Utah Stars. He was replaced by Babe McCarthy.

== Statistical leaders ==
Category	Total			Average			
Category	Player	Team	Total	Player	Team	Avg.	Games played
Points	Dan Issel	Kentucky Colonels	521	Julius Erving	Virginia Squires	29.6	5
Rebounds	Artis Gilmore	Kentucky Colonels	260	Mel Daniels	Indiana Pacers	13.8	18
Assists	Freddie Lewis	Indiana Pacers	91	Bill Melchionni	New York Nets	6.2	5

=== Total leaders ===
Points

1. Dan Issel - 521
2. George McGinnis - 431
3. Artis Gilmore - 361
4. Rick Mount - 321
5. Mel Daniels - 286

Rebounds

1. Artis Gilmore - 260
2. Mel Daniels - 248
3. Dan Issel - 225
4. George McGinnis - 222
5. Billy Cunningham - 142

Assists

1. Freddie Lewis - 91
2. Jim O'Brien - 82
3. Walt Simon - 79
4. Artis Gilmore - 75
5. Billy Keller - 63

Minutes

1. Dan Issel - 825
2. Artis Gilmore - 780
3. George McGinnis - 731
4. Rick Mount - 676
5. Walt Simon - 639
