= 1971–72 Kentucky Colonels season =

ABA basketball team season

- Division champions
- Head coach: Joe Mullaney
- Arena: Freedom Hall

Results
- Record: 68–16 (.810)
- Place: Division: 1st (Eastern)
- Playoff finish: Division Semifinals (lost to the Nets 2–4)

The 1971–72 Kentucky Colonels season was the fifth season of the Colonels franchise in the American Basketball Association. The Colonels won 68 games during the season, en route to not just the best record ever put out in ABA history, but also their first ever Eastern Division title. This season, they were led by both second-year star player Dan Issel and rookie star center Artis Gilmore, who like Issel before him, signed a 10-year deal worth $1.5 million. Gilmore won both the ABA Rookie of the Year and the ABA Most Valuable Player awards, averaging 23.8 points and 17.8 rebounds per game, later joining Issel as eventual members of the Naismith Basketball Hall of Fame. However, despite the Colonels having the best record in ABA history this season, they were ultimately upset early on in the 1972 ABA Playoffs by 6 games against the New York Nets in the Eastern Division Semifinals. One other notable thing involving the Colonels this season had them going up against the Baltimore Bullets in the second ever ABA Vs. NBA exhibition game on September 22, 1971, in Louisville, Kentucky, with Kentucky winning that match 111–85.

== ABA Draft ==
This draft was the first ABA draft to have a properly recorded historical note of every round in their draft available.

| Round | Pick | Player | Position(s) | Nationality | College |
|---|---|---|---|---|---|
| 1 | 8 | Artis Gilmore | C | United States | Jacksonville |
| 3 | 25 | John Roche | PG | United States | South Carolina |
| 4 | 40 | Fred Brown | PG/SG | United States | Iowa |
| 5 | 51 | Mike Gale | PG/SG | United States | Elizabeth City State College |
| 6 | 62 | Jim Welch | G | United States | Houston |
| 7 | 73 | Larry Steele | SG/SF | United States | Kentucky |
| 8 | 84 | Clarence Sherrod | G | United States | Wisconsin |
| 9 | 95 | Mike O'Brien | F | United States | Saint Leo College |
| 10 | 106 | Larry Saunders | F | United States | Duke |
| 11 | 117 | Sid Catlett | F | United States | Notre Dame |
| 12 | 127 | Jim Dinwiddie | G | United States | Kentucky |
| 13 | 137 | Pierre Russell | SG | United States | Kansas |
| 14 | 146 | Jerome Perry | G | United States | Western Kentucky |
| 15 | 155 | Willie Cherry | F | United States | Denver |

As of 2025, Artis Gilmore would be the only player that was actually drafted during the 1971 ABA draft to have ended up becoming a member of the Naismith Basketball Hall of Fame. (While both Julius Erving and George McGinnis would end up joining Artis Gilmore as members of the Hall of Fame themselves later on, both of those players wound up becoming undrafted players in this ABA draft unlike Gilmore himself due to them both being juniors in their respective universities at the time of the draft, which was partially done as a stipulation by the NBA themselves in order to have the originally planned ABA-NBA merger occur back in 1971 instead of when it actually did occur years later in 1976.)

== Roster ==
1971–72 Kentucky Colonels roster
Players

| Pos. | No. | Player | Height | Weight | DOB | From |
|---|---|---|---|---|---|---|
| SG | 35 | Darel Carrier | 6 ft 3 in (1.91 m) | 185 lb (84 kg) | October 26, 1940 | Western Kentucky |
| PG | 10 | Louie Dampier | 6 ft 0 in (1.83 m) | 170 lb (77 kg) | November 20, 1944 | Kentucky |
| PG | 32 | Mike Gale | 6 ft 4 in (1.93 m) | 185 lb (84 kg) | July 18, 1950 | Elizabeth City State |
| C | 53 | Artis Gilmore | 7 ft 2 in (2.18 m) | 240 lb (109 kg) | September 21, 1949 | Jacksonville |
| PF | 4 | Les Hunter | 6 ft 7 in (2.01 m) | 210 lb (95 kg) | August 16, 1942 | Loyola Chicago |
| C | 44 | Dan Issel | 6 ft 9 in (2.06 m) | 235 lb (107 kg) | October 25, 1948 | Kentucky |
| PF | 22 | Jim Ligon | 6 ft 7 in (2.01 m) | 210 lb (95 kg) | February 22, 1944 | Kokomo High School |
| PG | 3 | Jim O'Brien | 6 ft 1 in (1.85 m) | 170 lb (77 kg) | April 9, 1950 | Boston College |
| SF | 9 | Cincy Powell | 6 ft 7 in (2.01 m) | 220 lb (100 kg) | February 25, 1942 | Portland |
| SG | 33 | Mike Pratt | 6 ft 4 in (1.93 m) | 195 lb (88 kg) | August 4, 1948 | Kentucky |
| SG | 15, 30 | Pierre Russell | 6 ft 4 in (1.93 m) | 190 lb (86 kg) | December 13, 1949 | Kansas |
| SF | 2 | Walt Simon | 6 ft 6 in (1.98 m) | 200 lb (91 kg) | December 1, 1939 | Benedict |
| SG | 3 | Howie Wright | 6 ft 3 in (1.91 m) | 185 lb (84 kg) | February 22, 1947 | Austin Peay |

Coaches
Head coach

Joe Mullaney

Legend
- (DP) Unsigned draft pick
- (FA) Free agent
- (S) Suspended
- Injured

Roster

== Final standings ==
=== Eastern Division ===
| Team | W | L | % | GB |
|---|---|---|---|---|
| Kentucky Colonels | 68 | 16 | .810 | - |
| Virginia Squires | 45 | 39 | .536 | 23 |
| New York Nets | 44 | 40 | .524 | 24 |
| The Floridians | 36 | 48 | .429 | 32 |
| Carolina Cougars | 35 | 49 | .417 | 33 |
| Pittsburgh Condors | 25 | 59 | .298 | 43 |

== ABA Playoffs ==
ABA Eastern Division Semifinals

| Game | Date | Location | Score | Record | Attendance |
| 1 | April 1 | Kentucky | 108–122 | 0–1 | 4,772 |
| 2 | April 4 | Kentucky | 90–105 | 0–2 | 8,212 |
| 3 | April 5 | New York | 105–99 | 1–2 | 14,056 |
| 4 | April 7 | New York | 92–100 | 1–3 | 14,896 |
| 5 | April 8 | Kentucky | 109–103 | 2–3 | 7,949 |
| 6 | April 10 | New York | 96–101 | 2–4 | 11,533 |

Colonels lose series, 4–2

== Awards and honors ==
1972 ABA All-Star Game selections (game played on January 29, 1972, in Louisville, Kentucky)

- Dan Issel (named MVP of the game)
- Louie Dampier
- Artis Gilmore

Coach Joe Mullaney was also selected to coach the Eastern Division Team.

- ABA Most Valuable Player Award: Artis Gilmore
- Rookie of the Year: Artis Gilmore
- All ABA-First Team selections
  - Dan Issel
  - Artis Gilmore
- All ABA-Rookie Team selections
  - Artis Gilmore
