= 1969–70 New York Nets season =

ABA basketball team season

- Head coach: York Larese
- Arena: Island Garden

Results
- Record: 39–45 (.464)
- Place: Division: 4th (Eastern (ABA))
- Playoff finish: Division semifinals (lost to Colonels 3–4)
- Stats at Basketball Reference

The 1969–70 New York Nets season was the third season of the franchise in the ABA and second season using the New York Nets name after previously going by the New Jersey Americans in their inaugural season. This season would become their first season where they actually make it to the ABA Playoffs, though they would lose the first round to the Kentucky Colonels 4–3.

== Roster ==
1969–70 New York Nets roster
Players

Pos.	No.	Player	Height	Weight	DOB	From
SF	12	Bob Arnzen	6 ft 5 in (1.96 m)	205 lb (93 kg)	1947-11-03	Notre Dame
C	45	Bob Christian	6 ft 10 in (2.08 m)	255 lb (116 kg)	1944-05-11	Grambling State
SG	9	Steve Chubin	6 ft 2 in (1.88 m)	200 lb (91 kg)	1944-02-08	Rhode Island
PF	11	Sonny Dove	6 ft 7 in (2.01 m)	198 lb (90 kg)	1945-08-16	St. John's
PG	21, 33	Billy Evans	6 ft 0 in (1.83 m)	170 lb (77 kg)	1947-03-03	Boston College
F	11	Jack Gillespie	6 ft 6 in (1.98 m)	215 lb (98 kg)	1947-10-01	Montana State
PF	14	Luther Green	6 ft 7 in (2.01 m)	190 lb (86 kg)	1946-11-13	LIU Brooklyn
C	10	Dennis Grey	6 ft 8 in (2.03 m)	215 lb (98 kg)	1947-08-26	US International
PF	40	Les Hunter	6 ft 7 in (2.01 m)	210 lb (95 kg)	1942-08-16	Loyola Chicago
C	20	Ed Johnson	6 ft 8 in (2.03 m)	205 lb (93 kg)	1944-06-17	Tennessee State
SF	15	Barry Kramer	6 ft 4 in (1.93 m)	200 lb (91 kg)	1942-11-10	NYU
PG	32	George Lehmann	6 ft 0 in (1.83 m)	180 lb (82 kg)	1942-05-01	Campbell
F	27	Bob McIntyre	6 ft 6 in (1.98 m)	215 lb (98 kg)	1944-01-23	St. John's
PG	3, 25	Bill Melchionni	6 ft 1 in (1.85 m)	165 lb (75 kg)	1944-10-19	Villanova
SF	4	Walt Simon	6 ft 6 in (1.98 m)	200 lb (91 kg)	1939-12-01	Benedict
C	10, 21	John Smith	7 ft 0 in (2.13 m)	235 lb (107 kg)	1944-05-24	SCSC
G	23, 30	Levern Tart	6 ft 2 in (1.88 m)	195 lb (88 kg)	1942-06-01	Bradley
C	5	Ronald Taylor	7 ft 1 in (2.16 m)	265 lb (120 kg)	1947-11-21	USC

Coaches
Head coach
- York Larese

Legend
- (DP) Unsigned draft pick
- (FA) Free agent
- (S) Suspended
- Injured

Roster

== Standings ==
1969–70 ABA Eastern Standings
Eastern Division	W	L	PCT.	GB
Indiana Pacers	59	25	.702	—
Kentucky Colonels	45	39	.536	14
Carolina Cougars	42	42	.500	17
New York Nets	39	45	.464	20
Pittsburgh Pipers	29	55	.345	30
Miami Floridians	23	61	.274	36

== ABA Playoffs ==
ABA Eastern Division Semifinals vs. Kentucky Colonels

Game	Date	Location	Score	Record	Attendance
1	April 17	Kentucky	122–118 (OT)	1–0	2,105
2	April 18	Kentucky	111–113	1–1	3,178
3	April 19	New York	107–99	2–1	2,106
4	April 22	New York	101–128	2–2	4,721
5	April 26	Kentucky	127–112	3–2	2,045
6	April 28	New York	113–116	3–3	5,039
7	April 29	Kentucky	101–112	3–4	2,876

Nets lose series, 4–3
