= York Larese =

American basketball player and coach (1938–2016)

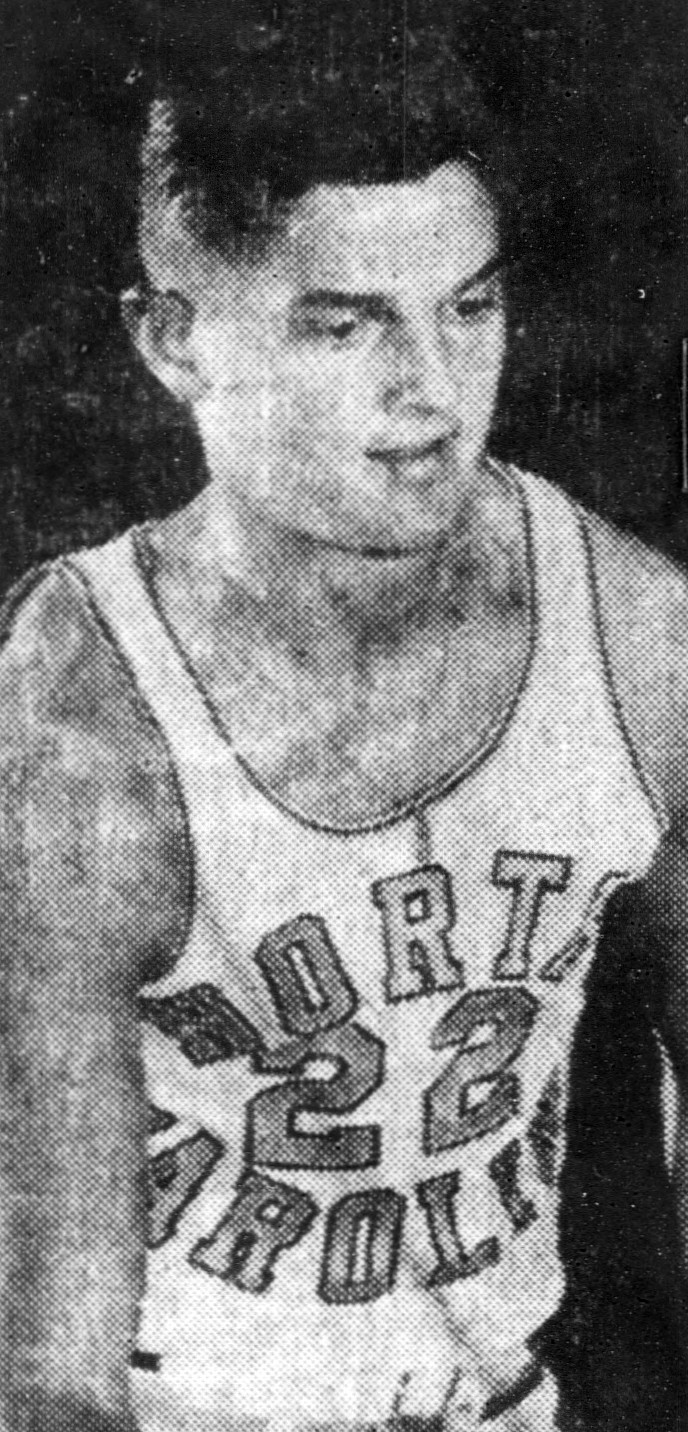
- Larese, circa 1960

Personal information
- Born: July 18, 1938 New York City, New York, U.S.
- Died: February 6, 2016 (aged 77) Medford, Massachusetts, U.S.
- Listed height: 6 ft 4 in (1.93 m)
- Listed weight: 183 lb (83 kg)

Career information
- High school: Saint Ann's Academy (New York City, New York)
- College: North Carolina (1958–1961)
- NBA draft: 1961: 2nd round, 20th overall pick
- Drafted by: Chicago Packers
- Playing career: 1961–1969
- Position: Shooting guard
- Number: 23, 34
- Coaching career: 1966–1971

Career history

Playing
- 1961: Chicago Packers
- 1961–1962: Philadelphia Warriors
- 1962–1963: Trenton Colonials
- 1963–1964: Williamsport Billies
- 1964–1965: Allentown Jets
- 1965–1966: Scranton Miners
- 1966–1969: Hartford Capitols

Coaching
- 1966–1969: Hartford Capitols
- 1969–1970: New York Nets
- 1971: Allentown Jets

Career highlights
- EPBL champion (1965); Second-team All-American – NABC, SN (1961); Third-team All-American – UPI, NEA (1961); Third-team All-American – NABC (1960); 2× Third-team All-American – AP (1959, 1961); 3× First-team All-ACC (1959–1961)

Career NBA statistics
- Points: 302 (5.3 ppg)
- Rebounds: 77 (1.3 rpg)
- Assists: 94 (1.6 apg)
- Stats at NBA.com
- Stats at Basketball Reference

York Bruno Larese (July 18, 1938 – February 6, 2016) was an American basketball player and coach.

== Amateur career ==
Larese was born in New York City and attended St. Ann's Academy (now Archbishop Molloy High School) in Queens. A 6-foot-4-inch (1.93 m) guard, he attended the University of North Carolina, leading the Atlantic Coast Conference in foul shooting in 1959–60 with 86.8 percent, which stood as the single-season UNC mark for 25 years. (That season included a 21-for-21 effort against Duke, which is still an ACC record.) Larese was twice selected third-team All-American (in 1958–59 and 1960–61).

== Pro career ==
Larese was one of the few players drafted twice by the NBA (whose rules at the time permitted this). First, he was selected by the St. Louis Hawks (now Atlanta Hawks) in the 1960 NBA draft, but chose to return to Chapel Hill; he was drafted again in 1961, this time by the Chicago Packers (now the Washington Wizards). Larese played eight games for Chicago before being waived on November 29, 1961; the Philadelphia Warriors signed him as a free agent the next day. Larese played 60 games for the Warriors (51 in the regular season and nine in the playoffs), including Wilt Chamberlain's famous 100-point game. (Larese scored nine points in that contest, and would often joke that he and Wilt scored 109 points between them.) After being cut by the Warriors, Larese began a seven-year career in the Eastern Professional Basketball League (EPBL), winning a championship with the Allentown Jets in 1965. He played from 1966 to 1969 with the EBA's Hartford Capitols, taking over as player/coach in 1968.

== Coaching career ==
In 1969, Larese moved up to the big-league basketball coaching ranks, taking the reins of the New York Nets of the ABA. The job was temporary, however; Larese agreed to coach the Nets for only one season, while Lou Carnesecca got out of his contract helming St. John's. After a 39–45 record and a fourth-place finish, Larese took a job with a shoe firm, Converse Rubber Co., on Long Island. In January 1971, Larese returned to Allentown to take over his old team, the Jets. After leading Allentown to the EBA playoffs that spring, however, Larese found that coaching the Jets was taking too much time away from his executive position at the shoe company, and so resigned at the end of the year.

== Personal life ==
York Larese was married to Barbara (Connally) Trockman and father of two sons (Keith and York Jr.) and two daughters (Kimberly and Karen). He died on February 6, 2016, at the age of 77.

== Career playing statistics ==
Legend
GP	Games played	GS	Games started	MPG	Minutes per game
FG%	Field goal percentage	3P%	3-point field goal percentage	FT%	Free throw percentage
RPG	Rebounds per game	APG	Assists per game	SPG	Steals per game
BPG	Blocks per game	PPG	Points per game	**Bold**	Career high

=== NBA ===
==== Regular season ====
Year	Team	GP	MPG	FG%	FT%	RPG	APG	PPG
1961–62	Chicago	8	7.1	**.476**	.556	.8	1.1	3.1
1961–62	Philadelphia	**51**	**12.7**	.366	**.841**	**1.4**	**1.7**	**5.4**
Career		59	11.9	.373	.806	1.3	1.6	5.1

==== Playoffs ====
Year	Team	GP	MPG	FG%	FT%	RPG	APG	PPG
1962	Philadelphia	9	8.7	.314	.667	2.1	.6	3.3

== Head coaching record ==
Legend
Regular season	G	Games coached	W	Games won	L	Games lost	W–L %	Win–loss %
Playoffs	PG	Playoff games	PW	Playoff wins	PL	Playoff losses	PW–L %	Playoff win–loss %

Team	Year	G	W	L	W–L%	Finish	PG	PW	PL	PW–L%	Result
New York	1969–70	84	39	45	.464	4th in Eastern	7	3	4	.429	Lost in Division semifinals
