= Louie Dampier =

American basketball player-coach (born 1944)

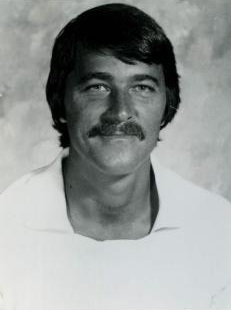
- Dampier in 1979

Personal information
- Born: November 20, 1944 (age 81) Indianapolis, Indiana, U.S.
- Listed height: 6 ft 0 in (1.83 m)
- Listed weight: 170 lb (77 kg)

Career information
- High school: Southport (Indianapolis, Indiana)
- College: Kentucky (1964–1967)
- NBA draft: 1967: 4th round, 38th overall pick
- Drafted by: Cincinnati Royals
- Playing career: 1967–1979
- Position: Point guard
- Number: 10

Career history
- 1967–1976: Kentucky Colonels
- 1976–1979: San Antonio Spurs

Career highlights
- ABA champion (1975); 7× ABA All-Star (1968–1970, 1972–1975); 4× All-ABA Second Team (1968–1970, 1974); ABA All-Rookie First Team (1968); ABA All-Time Team; 2× Consensus second-team All-America (1966, 1967); 2× First-team All-SEC (1966, 1967); Second-team All-SEC (1965)

Career ABA and NBA statistics
- Points: 15,279 (15.9 ppg)
- Rebounds: 2,543 (2.6 rpg)
- Assists: 4,687 (4.9 apg)
- Stats at NBA.com
- Stats at Basketball Reference
- Basketball Hall of Fame

Louis Dampier (born November 20, 1944) is an American former professional basketball player. He played professionally in the National Basketball Association (NBA) and American Basketball Association (ABA), primarily playing with the Kentucky Colonels.

A 6-foot-tall guard, Dampier is one of only a handful of men to play all nine seasons in the American Basketball Association (ABA) (1967–1976), all with the Kentucky Colonels. Dampier is the only player that played in the playoffs in all nine ABA years. His 728 games played in the ABA is the most for any player.

He also was one of just two players to play all nine ABA seasons with the same team; the other was Byron Beck of the Denver Rockets, later renamed the Nuggets. After the ABA–NBA merger in 1976, Dampier played three seasons (1976–1979) in the National Basketball Association (NBA) with the San Antonio Spurs. Dampier was inducted as a member of the Naismith Memorial Basketball Hall of Fame in 2015.

== High school ==
Dampier was born in Indianapolis and played at Southport High School; leading the Cardinals to two IHSAA Sectional titles and the finals of the IHSAA Regionals in 1961–62 and 1962–63. He also played in the Annual All-Star game featuring the top high school Senior players from Indiana and Kentucky. During the series following his senior season (1962–63) Dampier faced a Kentucky team led by Clem Haskins and Wayne Chapman. Dampier averaged 8.5 points as the Indiana team split the series with Kentucky.

== University of Kentucky ==
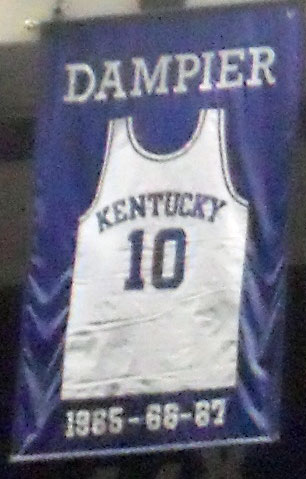
A jersey honoring Dampier hangs in Rupp Arena

Dampier was a two-sport athlete at the University of Kentucky, playing baseball as well as basketball. Playing under coach Adolph Rupp, Dampier, Tommy Kron and Pat Riley led Rupp's Runts to the 1966 NCAA championship game, where they lost to Texas Western College (now the University of Texas at El Paso) in a watershed game for college basketball. This game spearheaded the end of racial segregation in college basketball.

During his three years at Kentucky (at the time, freshmen were ineligible to play varsity sports), Dampier was a two-time All-American and three-time All-Southeastern Conference selection. He was also named Academic All-SEC twice and Academic All-American once. Upon graduation from Kentucky in 1967, Dampier scored 1,575 points, at the time third-most in school history behind only Cotton Nash (1,770) and Alex Groza (1,744).

== Pro basketball ==
In 1967, the Cincinnati Royals (now the Sacramento Kings) selected Dampier in the fourth round of the NBA draft and the Kentucky Colonels selected him in the ABA draft. Dampier eventually signed with the Kentucky Colonels of the fledgling ABA and teamed with Darel Carrier to form the most explosive backcourt duo in the league. In each of the ABA's first three seasons, both Dampier and Carrier averaged at least 20 points per game. Both were three-point field goal specialists (the ABA had used the three-point field goal from its inception), but especially Dampier who made 500 during a three-year stretch: a record 199 during the 1968–69 season, 198 in 1969–70 and 103 in 1970–71. At the conclusion of the ABA's history, Dampier made a career-record 794 3-point field goals. His record 199 three points made in a single season stood for 26 years in NBA until 1995.

He also finished first all-time in the ABA in games played (728), minutes played (27,770), points scored (13,726), and assists (4,044). During the 1970–71 season, he hit 57 consecutive free throws for what was then a pro record (ABA or NBA). Seven times, he was named an ABA All-Star. He was a unanimous choice for the ABA Top 30 team. He played on the Colonels' 1975 ABA championship team, which featured a later Kentucky standout, Dan Issel, as well as 7'2" center Artis Gilmore.

After the 1976 season, the ABA ceased operations with Kentucky and two other teams folding. He was one of only six players to play in the ABA for all nine seasons when the league existed, with Dampier joining Byron Beck as the only other player to stay with the franchise that first drafted them throughout their entire stay in the ABA (who coincidentally also had played in colleges nearby the professional team's area). Dampier was selected by the San Antonio Spurs (one of the four teams to join the NBA in the ABA–NBA merger) in the 1976 ABA Dispersal Draft. Playing mostly as a role player behind George Gervin, Dampier averaged 6.7 points in 232 NBA games.

Dampier later served as an assistant coach with the Denver Nuggets.

Several divisions in the 21st century semi-pro ABA were initially named after stars of the old ABA, including Dampier.

Dampier was inducted into the Naismith Memorial Basketball Hall of Fame in September 2015.

== ABA and NBA career statistics ==
Legend
GP	Games played	GS	Games started	MPG	Minutes per game
FG%	Field goal percentage	3P%	3-point field goal percentage	FT%	Free throw percentage
RPG	Rebounds per game	APG	Assists per game	SPG	Steals per game
BPG	Blocks per game	PPG	Points per game	**Bold**	Career high
*	Led the league

†	Denotes seasons in which Dampier's team won an ABA championship
*	ABA record

**Bold**	Denotes career highs

=== Regular season ===
Year	Team	GP	GS	MPG	FG%	3P%	FT%	RPG	APG	SPG	BPG	PPG
1967–68	Kentucky (ABA)	72	-	41.1	.421	.268	.823	**4.6**	3.6	-	-	20.7
1968–69	Kentucky (ABA)	78	-	**42.6***	.420	.361	.811	3.8	5.8	-	-	24.8
1969–70	Kentucky (ABA)	82	-	40.9	.399	.361	.831	3.8	5.5	-	-	**26.0**
1970–71	Kentucky (ABA)	**84**	-	38.3	.418	.368	.851	3.5	5.5	-	-	18.5
1971–72	Kentucky (ABA)	83	-	38.7	.442	.361	.836	3.1	6.2	-	-	15.9
1972–73	Kentucky (ABA)	80	-	38.0	.451	.348	.784	2.7	**6.5**	**1.2**	0.1	16.8
1973–74	Kentucky (ABA)	**84**	-	35.0	.465	.387*	.832	2.4	5.6	1.0	0.2	17.8
1974–75†	Kentucky (ABA)	83	-	34.7	.500	**.396**	.809	2.5	5.4	1.1	**0.6**	16.8
1975–76	Kentucky (ABA)	82	-	34.6	.479	.368	**.863**	1.9	5.7	0.7	**0.6**	13.0
1976–77	San Antonio	80	-	20.4	.460	-	.744	1.0	2.9	0.6	0.2	6.6
1977–78	San Antonio	82	-	24.8	**.509**	-	.752	1.5	3.5	1.1	0.2	9.1
1978–79	San Antonio	70	-	10.9	.490	-	.744	0.9	1.8	0.5	0.1	3.9
**Career ABA**		728*	-	38.1	.439	.358	.826	3.1	5.6	0.9	0.5	18.9
**Career NBA**		232	-	19.1	.488		.748	1.1	2.8	0.7	0.2	6.7
**Career Total**		960	-	33.5	.444	.358	.820	2.6	4.9	0.9	0.2	15.9

=== Playoffs ===
Year	Team	GP	GS	MPG	FG%	3P%	FT%	RPG	APG	SPG	BPG	PPG
1968	Kentucky (ABA)	5	-	44.8	.442	.405	.839	**4.8**	4.6	-	-	**26.6**
1969	Kentucky (ABA)	7	-	**46.6**	.357	.291	.870	4.3	4.0	-	-	22.3
1970	Kentucky (ABA)	12	-	43.8	.369	.329	.774	3.8	6.8	-	-	17.7
1971	Kentucky (ABA)	**19**	-	43.6	.385	.319	.742	4.1	**9.4**	-	-	16.9
1972	Kentucky (ABA)	6	-	42.3	.420	.478	.625	3.2	7.5	-	-	13.2
1973	Kentucky (ABA)	12	-	34.8	.516	.455	.700	2.1	3.3	-	-	13.4
1974	Kentucky (ABA)	8	-	28.6	.483	**.500**	.778	2.0	4.0	0.8	0.0	13.4
1975†	Kentucky (ABA)	15	-	40.3	.509	.385	.868	2.4	7.5	**1.3**	**0.5**	16.9
1976	Kentucky (ABA)	10	-	39.3	.519	**.500**	.900	1.3	7.7	1.1	**0.5**	16.0
1977	San Antonio	2	-	31.0	.250	-	**1.000**	1.5	4.5	0.5	0.5	6.0
1978	San Antonio	6	-	21.5	.459	-	.250	1.2	2.5	0.7	0.3	5.8
1979	San Antonio	7	-	7.9	**.571**	-	.571	0.7	1.1	0.4	0.1	2.9
**Career ABA**		94	-	40.4	.436	.366	.789	3.0	6.6	1.1	0.4	16.9
**Career NBA**		15	-	16.4	.433		.600	1.0	2.1	0.5	0.3	4.5
**Career Total**		109	-	37.1	.436	.366	.781	2.8	6.0	0.9	0.3	15.1

== See also ==
- Basketball in Indiana
