= Mike Gale =

American basketball player (1950–2020)

Personal information
- Born: July 18, 1950 Philadelphia, Pennsylvania, U.S.
- Died: July 31, 2020 (aged 70)
- Listed height: 6 ft 4 in (1.93 m)
- Listed weight: 185 lb (84 kg)

Career information
- High school: Overbrook (Philadelphia, Pennsylvania)
- College: Elizabeth City State (1967–1971)
- NBA draft: 1971: 3rd round, 47th overall pick
- Drafted by: Chicago Bulls
- Playing career: 1971–1982
- Position: Point guard / shooting guard
- Number: 32, 12, 11

Career history
- 1971–1974: Kentucky Colonels
- 1974–1975: New York Nets
- 1975–1980: San Antonio Spurs
- 1980–1981: Portland Trail Blazers
- 1981–1982: Golden State Warriors

Career highlights
- ABA champion (1974); 2× ABA All-Defensive First Team (1973, 1974)

Career ABA and NBA statistics
- Points: 6,203 (7.4 ppg)
- Assists: 3,146 (3.7 apg)
- Steals: 1,349 (1.8 spg)
- Stats at NBA.com
- Stats at Basketball Reference

Michael Eugene Gale (July 18, 1950 – July 31, 2020) was an American basketball player.

After graduating from Philadelphia's Overbrook High School, Gale, a 6'4" guard, played college basketball at Elizabeth City State University.

He was drafted in the third round of the 1971 NBA draft by the Chicago Bulls and by the Kentucky Colonels in the 1971 American Basketball Association draft. Gale opted to play for the Colonels.

Gale played in the National Basketball Association and American Basketball Association as a member of the Kentucky Colonels (1971–1974), the New York Nets (1974–1975), the San Antonio Spurs (1975–1980), the Portland Trail Blazers (1980–1981), and the Golden State Warriors (1981–1982). He tallied 6,203 career points to go with 3,146 career assists, and won the 1974 ABA Championship while with the Nets.

He was twice named to the ABA's All-Defensive First Team. Gale died at the age of 70 on July 31, 2020. Nicknamed "Sugar" because his shot was so sweet, as well as "Sticky Fingers" for being able to steal the ball. Settled down in San Antonio, TX.

Gale is remembered for an incident as a member of the San Antonio Spurs which occurred in the 1978 NBA Playoffs during the Eastern Conference semi-final series against the Washington Bullets. When the Spurs traveled to Landover, MD, for Game 6 of the series, Gale's luggage, which contained his Spurs road uniform, was lost at the airport and he had to borrow and wear a Bullets road uniform turned inside out while playing in the game.
