= 1971 ABA draft =

Basketball player selection

General information
- Sport: Basketball
- Dates: January 22, 1971 (Rounds 1–3); January 23, 1971 (Completion of Round 3); March 15, 1971 (Rounds 4–20)
- Location: Greensboro, North Carolina (January 22–23); New York, New York (March)

Overview
- 190 total selections in 20 rounds
- League: American Basketball Association
- Teams: 11
- First selection: Jim McDaniels, Utah Stars via Texas Chaparrals

The 1971 ABA draft was the fifth draft done by the American Basketball Association (ABA), a rivaling professional basketball league to the National Basketball Association (NBA) that they would eventually merge with as a part of the NBA later in the decade. Much like the previous year's draft, this year's draft would be first conducted on January 22, 1971 (with its third round being completed the following day afterward due to the first day of the draft going over the midnight hour while out in Greensboro, North Carolina (one of the home areas of the Carolina Cougars)) before being completed on March 15 later that year in New York, New York (home of not just the ABA’s newer headquarters, but also the New York Nets), with New York being the permanent home area of all major ABA drafts going forward. This year's draft period for the ABA and its aftermath months later would see arguably its greatest impact upon the league for success with not just some of the players that joined the ABA instead of the NBA, but also with a couple of its undrafted players from this draft period as well (which related to earlier conditions the NBA laid out to the ABA in their initial merger talks before the United States Senate helped nix the first merger talks entirely), primarily that of the ABA's All-Time MVP Julius Erving and George McGinnis. The ABA would steal away three players that NBA teams had drafted in the first round of the 1971 NBA draft (Darnell Hillman from the Golden State Warriors, John Roche from the Phoenix Suns, and Collis Jones from the Milwaukee Bucks by the Indiana Pacers, New York Nets, and Texas Chaparrals respectively), though none of them would hold a great impact upon either the NBA or ABA despite Roche being a member of the ABA's All-Rookie Team during his first season, while the only Hall of Famers from the NBA's draft class that year as of 2025 (Spencer Haywood from 1969 and #8 pick Artis Gilmore) would both play in the ABA first before entering the NBA in later years, with the ABA's draft actually producing more Hall of Famers by comparison this time around. Interestingly, the final pick of this draft, an individual named "Slick Pinkham", would be drafted in what was essentially a prank draft pick by the Indiana Pacers since he was a gag name that was a portmanteau of head coach Bobby "Slick" Leonard and team owner Dick Tinkham, who actually did attend DePauw University. This year would also see only one team rebrand themselves some months after this draft period concluded, with the Texas Chaparrals returning to their original Dallas Chaparrals name following their only draft under the Texas regional name instead, thus making this the ABA's most successful draft period by that point in time.

== Draftee career notes ==
This year marked the first time the ABA draft would not have the same #1 draft pick as the NBA draft did in the same year. While the NBA draft had Austin Carr from the University of Notre Dame get selected at #1 by the Cleveland Cavaliers (who became an All-Star in the NBA and had his number retired by the Cavaliers), the ABA draft had Jim McDaniels from Western Kentucky University get selected at #1 by the Utah Stars via trading with the Texas Chaparrals instead (McDaniels would be selected in the second round as the 23rd pick by the NBA's Seattle SuperSonics, while Carr would be selected in the third round as, funnily enough, the 23rd pick by the ABA's Virginia Squires by comparison). However, McDaniels never played for either team by comparison and instead signed up with the Carolina Cougars after the draft ended, where he played well enough in his rookie season to be named one of the league's All-Stars from his draft class, but left the Cougars to join the SuperSonics in the NBA instead due to him being dissatisfied with his contract that would have had it be paid out throughout the course of 25 years, after which he never gained the same level of success afterward either in the NBA or in his brief return to the ABA in 1976. By contrast, the biggest success story in terms of players drafted by the ABA that year would occur with what became the eighth pick of the draft that year, center Artis Gilmore from the University of Jacksonville. During his time with the Kentucky Colonels in the ABA, Gilmore would not only be considered both the ABA's Rookie of the Year and MVP in the same season, but he'd also be named both an All-Star (including an All-Star MVP in 1974) and All-ABA First Team member in every season of play, as well as be named an All-ABA Defensive Team member in every season of play that grouping existed in (the only player to earn such a distinction), lead the league in rebounding for every season of play outside of his penultimate season there, and being named the ABA Playoffs' MVP in 1975 for the work he did with the Colonels in getting them their only championship before being shut out of the ABA-NBA merger a year later due to the Chicago Bulls wanting to gain Gilmore back in the NBA and them already having his draft rights beforehand (with Chicago drafting him as the 117th pick in the seventh round that year by comparison). His results in the ABA made him an easy ABA All-Time Team member, but his work with both the ABA and NBA would help propel him into the Naismith Basketball Hall of Fame.

Of the 92 overall ABA All-Stars, there were six players eligible to be selected in this year's draft that would make it to at least one ABA All-Star Game, with Roger Brown from the University of Kansas in particular being named an All-Star in the league's final season of existence in 1976 for the Denver Nuggets (the current team name of the Denver Rockets) due to them being the best team in the ABA that season under the unique circumstances the ABA dealt with that year. Outside of the previously mentioned players, the final drafted player to be named an All-Star in the ABA was Ted McClain, who became an All-Star during his final season with the Carolina Cougars due to his defensive prowess, primarily with leading the league in steals into earning him an All-ABA Defensive Team spot in 1974 before winning the final two ABA championships with the Kentucky Colonels and New York Nets respectively. As for the undrafted players that made it big, the first player that did so was George McGinnis, a sophomore player from the University of Indiana that signed with the local Indiana Pacers despite him not only violating the initial conditions set by the NBA in order to allow for the initial ABA-NBA merger to have happened by this time, but also facing threats by the NCAA for potentially violating their rules for signing away a player of theirs years earlier then they were intended to do so before the NCAA ultimately changed their own system for later drafts at hand. McGinnis would prove to be one of the ABA's most important players during the league's later years of existence (despite his youth questions at the time), as after he made it to the ABA's All-Rookie Team, he would not only be named an All-Star for the ABA three different times, but also made it to three different All-ABA Teams (once in the second team, twice in the first team), won two straight ABA championships with the Pacers (including the ABA Finals' MVP in 1973), and was named the ABA's co-MVP in 1975 due to him also leading the league in scoring that year before leaving the ABA later that year to play for the Philadelphia 76ers in the rivaling NBA, where he'd also see some success with (though not at the same level as with the ABA's Pacers). Still, his success in both the ABA and NBA later on would lead to him being named a member of the Naismith Basketball Hall of Fame, as well as lead to him being one of three ABA players (four overall Pacers player) to have his number retired by the Indiana squad as of 2025. The second, and arguably biggest, player that was undrafted that year to see major success in the ABA was Julius Erving, a junior player from the University of Massachusetts that signed with the Virginia Squires some time after the draft ended. Erving would showcase why he would be named the ABA's All-Time MVP in the five seasons of play with the league following his appearance in their All-Rookie First Team with five straight All-Star Game appearances (tying Artis Gilmore, Ralph Simpson, Mack Calvin, and Donnie Freeman for the third-most ABA All-Star appearances) alongside the league's only Slam Dunk Contest champion, five straight All-ABA Team appearances (tying Artis Gilmore, Dan Issel, and Mel Daniels for the most All-ABA Team appearances, though Erving would have four first team appearances and one second team appearance when compared to Gilmore's five straight first team appearances), three straight ABA MVP awards in the league's final seasons of play (though he'd share his MVP award in 1975 with George McGinnis), a three-time scoring champion for the ABA, an All-Defensive Team member in the ABA's final season, and two ABA Finals MVPs relating to championships won by the New York Nets (including the final ABA championship won altogether), as well as become the only ABA player to have a combined total of over 30,000 career points when combining both his ABA scoring totals with his NBA scoring totals, later earning the right to have his number be retired by both the Brooklyn Nets (the modern-day rendition of the New York Nets) and the Philadelphia 76ers in the NBA. Another undrafted player eligible for this year's draft, Johnny Neumann from the University of Mississippi, was notable for signing a five year deal worth a total of $2 million, though while he made it to the All-Rookie Team as well, he didn't do much with his career by comparison to the other players. One other notable player from this draft year, fifth round pick Mike Gale of the Kentucky Colonels, would also make it to the All-Defensive Team twice in the league, thus being one of seven players to take part in the All-Defensive Team twice by comparison.

== Historic draft notes ==
Unlike the first four years of the ABA's existence, this year would mark the first year where the ABA would properly record every round's draft ordering for their draft system, with it working similarly to the NBA's own draft system at the time with the worst team having the first pick in each round available and the best team in terms of records picking last. This draft period also marked the first time where the #1 draft pick in the ABA would be traded to another team, with the recently rebranded Texas Chaparrals trading their first round pick alongside Donnie Freeman and Wayne Hightower to the Utah Stars (who later won the ABA Finals Championship that year) in exchange for Ron Boone, Glen Combs, and the Stars' own first round pick instead, though neither player drafted would play for the teams that went and drafted them. This also was the only draft year that the Texas Chaparrals would participate in a draft under that specific name, as the Chaparrals would ditch the regional branding with the entire state of Texas months after the draft concluded to return to their original Dallas Chaparrals name out in Dallas, Texas for their next two seasons of play. Outside of that, no other team would otherwise move to a different location or otherwise rebrand themselves following the draft period's conclusion, which made this year the most stable draft period for the ABA yet. Also following the draft were the initial plans of the NBA–ABA merger that would have seen every ABA team join the NBA except for the Virginia Squires (the reason for their exclusion related to them being too close of proximity to the Baltimore Bullets, now Washington Wizards (who the owner had beef with when the Squires first moved to Washington D.C. back when the Oakland Oaks briefly became the Washington Caps)), which would have forced the Squires to either move yet again in order to join the NBA or fold operations altogether) starting by May 1971 before the Oscar Robertson v. National Basketball Association antitrust lawsuit ruined that merger plan entirely. This draft also saw Howard Porter's early leave for the ABA result in Villanova University vacate their NCAA Tournament wins during the season and three selections by the Virginia Squires (Tom Riker, Barry Parkhill, and Jim Chones) be later ruled as ineligible selections due to the planned merger talks that later failed in 1971. This draft also was the only draft where a prank selection was given out, with "Slick Pinkham" being selected by the Indiana Pacers as the last pick of the draft.

== Key ==
Pos.	G	F	C
Position	Guard	Forward	Center

Accomplishments key
Symbol	Meaning	Symbol	Meaning
^	Denotes player who has been inducted to the Naismith Memorial Basketball Hall of Fame	‡	Denotes player that was selected to the ABA All-Time Team
*	Denotes player who has been selected for at least one All-Star Game and All-ABA Team	+	Denotes player who has been selected for at least one All-Star Game
~	Denotes a player that won the ABA Rookie of the Year Award	#	Denotes player who has never appeared in either an ABA or NBA regular season or playoff game

== Draft ==
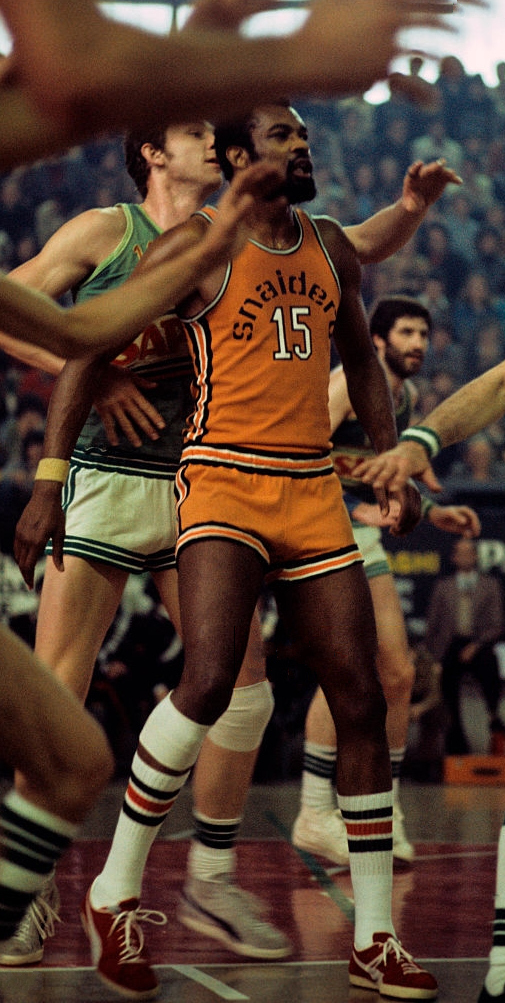
Jim McDaniels (upfront) was the first pick of the 1971 ABA Draft by the Utah Stars via trading with the Texas Chaparrals.

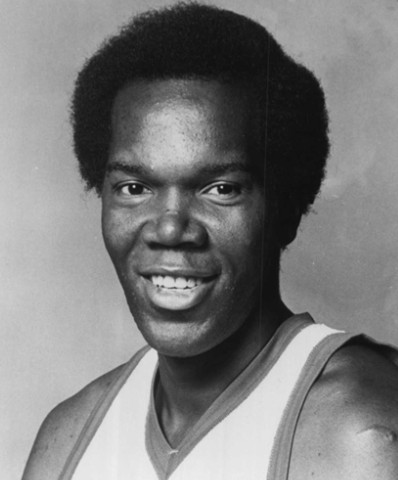
Ralph Simpson was the price paid by the Denver Rockets for the forfeiture of what became their initial fourth pick of the 1971 ABA Draft (though the Rockets would have another two selections to make up for it in this year's draft).

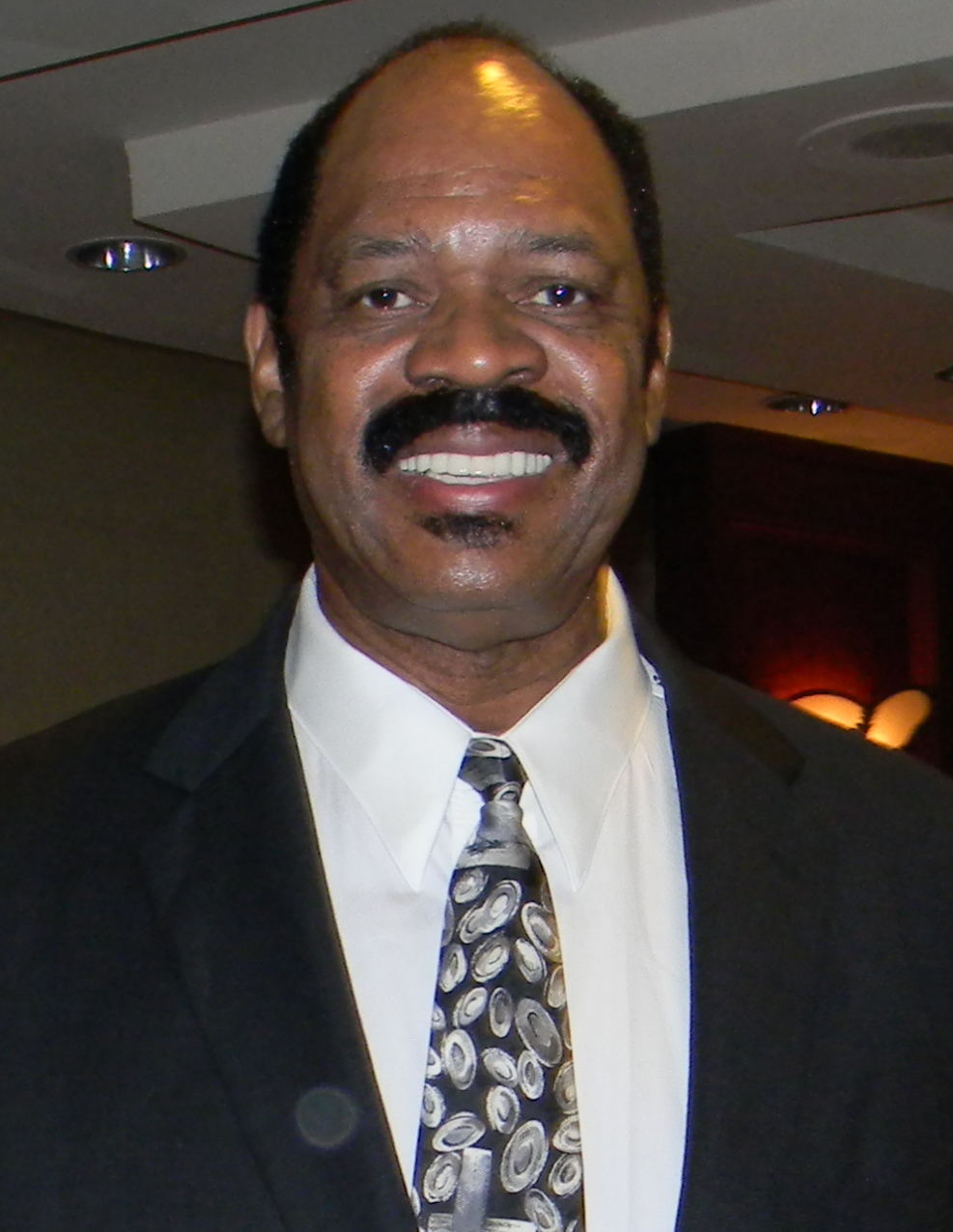
Artis Gilmore was the eighth pick in the 1971 ABA Draft by the Kentucky Colonels.

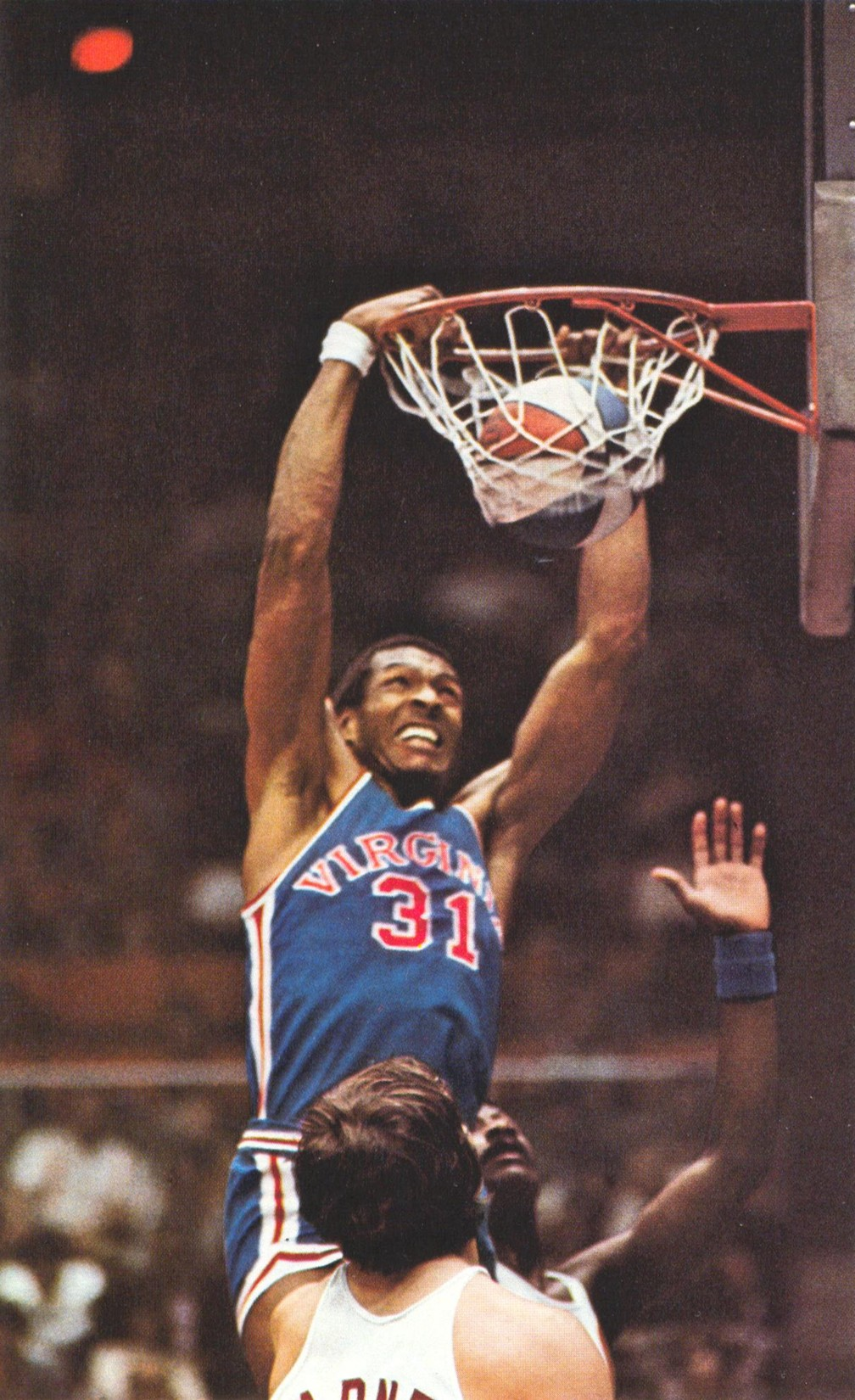
Roger Brown (dunking the ball) was the 20th pick in the 1971 ABA Draft by the Texas Chaparrals (who later returned to Dallas after the draft) via trading with the Utah Stars.

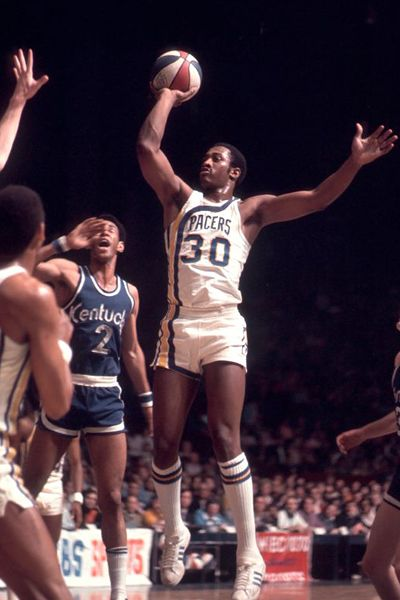
George McGinnis (center right) was one of the most successful players in ABA history despite not being drafted in the 1971 ABA Draft since he was signed by the Indiana Pacers months after the draft concluded despite warnings by the NBA to not sign anymore college underclassmen by this time in order for a potential merger to occur.

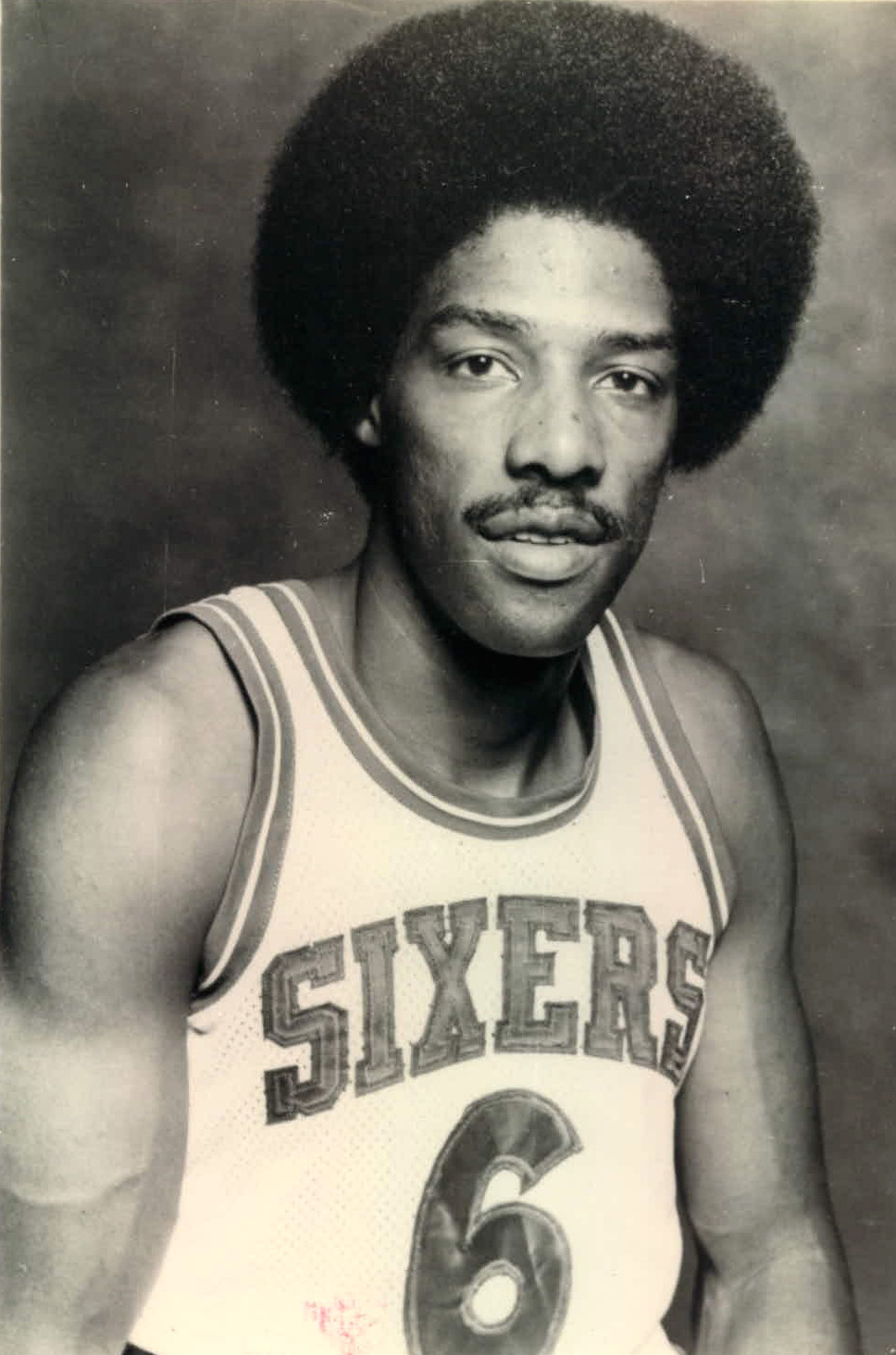
Julius Erving is considered the ABA's All-Time MVP despite never being officially drafted by the ABA; he would sign a deal with the Virginia Squires several months after the draft concluded following the revelation that the originally planned ABA-NBA merger wouldn't happen after all due in part to another lawsuit involving a player against the NBA.

Round	Pick	Player	Pos.	Nationality	Team	School/Club team
1	1	Jim McDaniels^{+}	PF/C	United States	Utah Stars (from Texas)	Western Kentucky (Sr.)
1	2	Elmore Smith	C	United States	Carolina Cougars	Kentucky State (Sr.)
1	3	Howard Porter	PF/SF	United States	Pittsburgh Condors	Villanova (Sr.)
1	Denver Rockets (forfeited their initial #4 pick due to the acquisition of sophomore Ralph Simpson after the previous draft year)					
1	4	Cliff Meely	PF	United States	Denver Rockets (from The Floridians)	Colorado (Sr.)
1	5	Ken Durrett	PF	United States	Denver Rockets (from New York via Virginia)	La Salle (Sr.)
1	6	Randy Denton	C	United States	Memphis Pros	Duke (Sr.)
1	7	Willie Sojourner	C/PF	United States	Virginia Squires (from Indiana via Kentucky)	Weber State (Sr.)
1	8	Artis Gilmore~^‡	C	United States	Kentucky Colonels	Jacksonville (Sr.)
1	9	Stan Love	PF	United States	Texas Chaparrals (from Utah)	Oregon (Sr.)
1	10	Dana Lewis^{#}	C	United States	Virginia Squires	Tulsa (Sr.)
2	11	Sidney Wicks	PF	United States	Texas Chaparrals	UCLA (Sr.)
2	12	Levi Wyatt^{#}	F	United States	Pittsburgh Condors	Alcorn A&M College (Sr.)
2	13	Rich Yunkus	PF/C	United States	Carolina Cougars	Georgia Tech (Sr.)
2	14	Marv Roberts	PF/C	United States	Denver Rockets	Utah State (Sr.)
2	15	Willie Long	SF/PF	United States	The Floridians	New Mexico (Sr.)
2	16	Charlie Davis	PG	United States	New York Nets	Wake Forest (Sr.)
2	17	Bob Kissane^{#}	F	United States	New York Nets (from Virginia)	Holy Cross (Sr.)
2	18	Darnell Hillman	PF/C	United States	Indiana Pacers	San Jose State (Sr.)
2	19	Jake Ford^{#}	SG	United States	Memphis Pros	Western Kentucky (Sr.)
2	20	Roger Brown^{+}	C	United States	Texas Chaparrals (from Utah)	Kansas (Sr.)
2	21	Garry Nelson^{#}	C	United States	Utah Stars	Duquesne (Sr.)
3	22	Gregg Northington^{#}	C	United States	Carolina Cougars	Alabama State (Sr.)
3	23	Austin Carr	SG	United States	Virginia Squires	Notre Dame (Sr.)
3	24	John Mengelt	SG	United States	Indiana Pacers	Auburn (Sr.)
3	25	John Roche	PG	United States	Kentucky Colonels	South Carolina (Sr.)
3	26	Mike Newlin	SG	United States	Denver Rockets	Utah (Sr.)
3	27	Jim O'Brien	G	United States	Pittsburgh Condors	Boston College (Sr.)
3	28	Walt Szczerbiak	SF	United States; West Germany	Texas Chaparrals	George Washington (Sr.)
3	29	Thorpe Weber^{#}	F	United States	Memphis Pros	Vanderbilt (Sr.)
3	30	Ted McClain^{+}	PG/SG	United States	Carolina Cougars	Tennessee State (Sr.)
3	31	Rick Fisher	PF	United States	Utah Stars	Colorado State (Sr.)
3	32	Marvin Stewart^{#}	G	United States	New York Nets	Nebraska (Sr.)
4	33	Gene Phillips	SG	United States	Texas Chaparrals	SMU (Sr.)
4	34	Al Smith	PG	United States	Denver Rockets	Bradley (Sr.)
4	35	Bill Smith^{#}	C	United States	Pittsburgh Condors (from Carolina)	Syracuse (Sr.)
4	36	Tom Owens	C/PF	United States	Memphis Pros (from The Floridians)	South Carolina (Sr.)
4	37	Bubba Jones^{#}	G	United States	Pittsburgh Condors	Ashland (Sr.)
4	38	Amos Thomas^{#}	SG/SF	United States	Memphis Pros	Southwestern State (Sr.)
4	39	Dick Gibbs	SF	United States	New York Nets	UTEP (Sr.)
4	40	Fred Brown	PG/SG	United States	Kentucky Colonels	Iowa (Sr.)
4	41	Dana Pagett	G	United States	Virginia Squires	USC (Sr.)
4	42	Jim Cleamons	PG/SG	United States	Indiana Pacers	Ohio State (Sr.)
4	43	Mo Layton	PG	United States	Utah Stars	USC (Sr.)
5	44	Collis Jones	SF/PF	United States	Texas Chaparrals	Notre Dame (Sr.)
5	45	Dave Robisch	C/PF	United States	Denver Rockets	Kansas (Sr.)
5	46	Luke Adams^{#}	F	United States	Carolina Cougars	Lamar State (Sr.)
5	47	Rich Rinaldi	G	United States	The Floridians	Saint Peter's (Sr.)
5	48	Mike Jordan^{#}	F	United States	Pittsburgh Condors	Savannah State (Sr.)
5	49	Kennedy McIntosh	PF	United States	Memphis Pros	Eastern Michigan (Sr.)
5	50	Glen Summors^{#}	F	United States	New York Nets	Gannon College (Jr.)
5	51	Mike Gale	PG/SG	United States	Kentucky Colonels	Elizabeth City State (Sr.)
5	52	Tom Riker	C/PF	United States	Virginia Squires	South Carolina (Jr.)
5	53	Clarence Glover	SF	United States	Indiana Pacers	Western Kentucky (Sr.)
5	54	Lee Dedmon^{#}	F	United States	Utah Stars	North Carolina (Sr.)
6	55	George Trapp	PF/C	United States	Texas Chaparrals	Cal State Long Beach (Sr.)
6	56	William Graham^{#}	F	United States	Denver Rockets	Kentucky State (Sr.)
6	57	Ron Rippetoe^{#}	G	United States	Carolina Cougars	David Lipscomb College (Sr.)
6	58	Larry Holliday^{#}	G	United States	The Floridians	Oregon (Sr.)
6	59	Barry Nelson	C	United States	Pittsburgh Condors	Duquesne (Sr.)
6	60	Fred Hilton	SG	United States	Memphis Pros	Grambling (Sr.)
6	61	Matt Necaise^{#}	F	United States	New York Nets	William Carey College (Sr.)
6	62	Jim Welch^{#}	G	United States	Kentucky Colonels	Houston (Sr.)
6	63	Barry Parkhill	SG	United States	Virginia Squires	Virginia (So.)
6	64	Jeff Halliburton	SG	United States	Indiana Pacers	Drake (Sr.)
6	65	Bobby Fields	G	United States	Utah Stars	La Salle (Sr.)
7	66	Sterling Quant^{#}	PF	The Bahamas	Texas Chaparrals	Central State (Sr.)
7	67	Ken Gardner	SF	United States	Denver Rockets	Utah (Sr.)
7	68	Ed Kemp^{#}	F	United States	Carolina Cougars	Adams State (Sr.)
7	69	Greg Starrick^{#}	G	United States	The Floridians	Southern Illinois (Sr.)
7	70	John Sutter^{#}	F	United States	Pittsburgh Condors	Tulane (Sr.)
7	71	Loyd King	SG	United States	Memphis Pros	Virginia Tech (Sr.)
7	72	Odis Allison	SF	United States	New York Nets	UNLV (Sr.)
7	73	Larry Steele	SG/SF	United States	Kentucky Colonels	Kentucky (Sr.)
7	74	Clifford Ray	C/PF	United States	Virginia Squires	Oklahoma (Sr.)
7	75	Dean Meminger	PG	United States	Indiana Pacers	Marquette (Sr.)
7	76	Erwin Johnson^{#}	F	United States	Utah Stars	Augusta (Sr.)
8	77	Curtis Rowe	PF	United States	Texas Chaparrals	UCLA (Sr.)
8	78	Tyrone Marioneaux^{#}	C	United States	Denver Rockets	Loyola (New Orleans) (Sr.)
8	79	Kenneth Davis^{#}	PG	United States	Carolina Cougars	Georgetown College (KY) (Sr.)
8	80	Tom Lee^{#}	F	United States	The Floridians	Arizona (Sr.)
8	81	Charlie Yelverton	SG/SF	United States	Pittsburgh Condors	Fordham (Sr.)
8	82	James Douglas^{#}	G	United States	Memphis Pros	Memphis State (Sr.)
8	83	John Duncan^{#}	F	United States	New York Nets	Kentucky Wesleyan (Sr.)
8	84	Clarence Sherrod^{#}	G	United States	Kentucky Colonels	Wisconsin (Sr.)
8	85	Bill Gerry^{#}	F	United States	Virginia Squires	Virginia (Sr.)
8	86	Vic Bartolome^{#}	G	United States	Indiana Pacers	UCLA (Sr.)
8	87	Jim Day^{#}	F	United States	Utah Stars	Morehead State (Sr.)
9	88	Jimmie Guymon^{#}	G	United States	Texas Chaparrals	Eastern New Mexico (Sr.)
9	89	Mike Childress^{#}	C	United States	Denver Rockets	Colorado State (Sr.)
9	90	Dave Wohl	PG	United States	Carolina Cougars	Pennsylvania (Sr.)
9	91	Jim Haderlein^{#}	F	United States	The Floridians	Loyola Los Angeles (Sr.)
9	92	Vincent White^{#}	F	United States	Pittsburgh Condors	Savannah State (Sr.)
9	93	Henry Smith^{#}	F	United States	Memphis Pros	Missouri (Sr.)
9	94	Jarrett Durham	F	United States	New York Nets	Duquesne (Sr.)
9	95	Mike O'Brien^{#}	F	United States	Kentucky Colonels	Saint Leo (Sr.)
9	96	Jim Chones	C/PF	United States	Virginia Squires	Marquette (Jr.)
9	97	Tom Crosswhite^{#}	F	United States	Indiana Pacers	Dayton (Sr.)
9	98	Willie Humes^{#}	G	United States	Utah Stars	Idaho State (Sr.)
10	99	Gene Knoll^{#}	G	United States	Texas Chaparrals	Texas Tech (Sr.)
10	100	George Faerber^{#}	F	United States	Denver Rockets	Purdue (Sr.)
10	101	Ken Mayfield	SG	United States	Carolina Cougars	Tuskegee (Sr.)
10	102	Doug Rex^{#}	F	United States	The Floridians	UC Santa Barbara (Sr.)
10	103	James Fleming^{#}	F	United States	Pittsburgh Condors	Alcorn A&M College (Sr.)
10	104	Jim Gregory^{#}	F	United States	Memphis Pros	East Carolina (Sr.)
10	105	Eric Hill^{#}	G	United States	Pittsburgh Condors (from New York)	Minnesota (Sr.)
10	106	Larry Saunders^{#}	F	United States	Kentucky Colonels	Duke (Sr.)
10	107	Gil McGregor	PF	United States	Virginia Squires	Wake Forest (Sr.)
10	108	Larry Weatherford^{#}	G	United States	Indiana Pacers	Purdue (Sr.)
10	109	Jake Jones	SG	United States	Utah Stars	Assumption College (Sr.)
11	110	Al Shumate^{#}	SF	United States	Texas Chaparrals	North Texas State (Sr.)
11	111	John Ribock^{#}	F	United States	Denver Rockets	South Carolina (Sr.)
11	112	Bobby McKenney^{#}	C	United States	Carolina Cougars	Pepperdine (Sr.)
11	113	Gerald Lockett^{#}	F	United States	The Floridians	Arkansas AM&N College (Sr.)
11	114	Rayford McCambry^{#}	G	United States	Pittsburgh Condors	Miles College (Sr.)
11	115	Danny Davis^{#}	F	United States	Memphis Pros	Henderson State (Sr.)
11	116	Bill Warner^{#}	G	United States	New York Nets	Arizona (Sr.)
11	117	Sid Catlett	F	United States	Kentucky Colonels	Notre Dame (Sr.)
11	118	Héctor Blondet^{#}	F	Puerto Rico	Virginia Squires	Murray State (Sr.)
11	119	Jim England^{#}	G	United States	Indiana Pacers	Tennessee (Sr.)
11	Utah Stars (Passed up on using this selection.)					
12	120	Willie Hart^{#}	C	United States	Texas Chaparrals	Grambling (So.)
12	121	Gary Brell^{#}	F	United States	Denver Rockets	Marquette (Sr.)
12	122	Craig Love^{#}	F	United States	Carolina Cougars	Ohio (Sr.)
12	123	Will Allen	F	United States	The Floridians	Miami (FL) (Sr.)
12	124	Isaiah Wilson	SG	United States	Pittsburgh Condors	Baltimore (Sr.)
12	125	Gary Reist^{#}	G	United States	Memphis Pros	Rice (Sr.)
12	126	Blaine Henry^{#}	G	United States	New York Nets	Marshall (Sr.)
12	127	Jim Dinwiddie^{#}	G	United States	Kentucky Colonels	Kentucky (Sr.)
12	128	Luis Grillo^{#}	PG	United States	Virginia Squires	Sunbury Mercuries (EBA)
12	129	Jeff Smith^{#}	F	United States	Indiana Pacers	New Mexico State (Jr.)
12	Utah Stars (Passed up on using this selection.)					
13	130	Goo Kennedy	PF/C	United States	Texas Chaparrals	TCU (Sr.)
13	131	Glen Richgels^{#}	C	United States	Denver Rockets	Wisconsin (Sr.)
13	132	Bob Wenzel^{#}	G	United States	Carolina Cougars	Rutgers (Sr.)
13	133	Jackie Ridgle	SG	United States	The Floridians	California (Sr.)
13	134	Ray Greene^{#}	G	United States	Pittsburgh Condors	California State (Pennsylvania) (Sr.)
13	135	Edward Hoskins^{#}	SF	United States	Memphis Pros	LeMoyne–Owen (Sr.)
13	136	Don Ward^{#}	G	United States	New York Nets	Colgate (Sr.)
13	137	Pierre Russell	SG	United States	Kentucky Colonels	Kansas (Sr.)
13	Virginia Squires (Passed up on using this selection.)					
13	138	Rick Katherman^{#}	F	United States	Indiana Pacers	Duke (Sr.)
13	Utah Stars (Passed up on using this selection.)					
14	139	Bill Brickhouse^{#}	G	United States	Texas Chaparrals	Montana State (Sr.)
14	140	Jerry Hyder^{#}	G	United States	Denver Rockets	Eastern New Mexico (Sr.)
14	141	Ron Dorsey	SF	United States	Carolina Cougars	Tennessee State (Sr.)
14	142	Pembrook Burrows^{#}	C	United States	The Floridians	Jacksonville (Sr.)
14	143	Gene Mumford^{#}	G	United States	Pittsburgh Condors	Scranton (Sr.)
14	144	Ken Riley^{#}	F	United States	Memphis Pros	Middle Tennessee (Sr.)
14	145	Skip Young^{#}	G	United States	New York Nets	Florida State (Sr.)
14	146	Jerome Perry^{#}	G	United States	Kentucky Colonels	Western Kentucky (Sr.)
14	Virginia Squires (Passed up on using this selection.)					
14	147	Clarence Smith^{#}	F	United States	Indiana Pacers	Villanova (Sr.)
14	Utah Stars (Passed up on using this selection.)					
15	148	William Chatmon^{#}	F	United States	Texas Chaparrals	Baylor (Sr.)
15	149	David Hall^{#}	C/PF	United States	Denver Rockets	Kansas State (Jr.)
15	150	Hank Commodore^{#}	G	United States	Carolina Cougars	Northwestern State (Sr.)
15	151	Ken May^{#}	F	United States	The Floridians	Dayton (Sr.)
15	152	Lee McCullough^{#}	F	United States	Pittsburgh Condors	Indiana (Pennsylvania) (Sr.)
15	153	Rod Behrens^{#}	PF	United States	Memphis Pros	Samford (Sr.)
15	154	Phillip Sisk^{#}	G	United States	New York Nets	Georgia Southern (Sr.)
15	155	Willie Cherry^{#}	F	United States	Kentucky Colonels	Denver (Sr.)
15	Virginia Squires (Passed up on using this selection.)					
15	156	Rich Walker^{#}	G	United States	Indiana Pacers	Bowling Green (Sr.)
15	Utah Stars (Passed up on using this selection.)					
16	157	Harry Taylor^{#}	G/F	United States	Texas Chaparrals	Los Angeles Baptist (Sr.)
16	158	Richard Dixon^{#}	G	United States	Denver Rockets	Loyola Los Angeles (Sr.)
16	159	Frank Lorthridge^{#}	C/PF	United States	Carolina Cougars	Pan American (Sr.)
16	160	Wayman Terrell^{#}	PF/C	United States	The Floridians	Oklahoma Baptist (Sr.)
16	161	Russell Golden^{#}	F	United States	Pittsburgh Condors	Jacksonville (Jr.)
16	162	Don Johnson^{#}	F	United States	Memphis Pros	Tennessee (Sr.)
16	163	Brian Mahoney	SG	United States	New York Nets	Manhattan (Sr.)
16	Kentucky Colonels (Passed up on using this selection.)					
16	Virginia Squires (Passed up on using this selection.)					
16	164	Tom Bush^{#}	C	United States	Indiana Pacers	Drake (Sr.)
16	Utah Stars (Passed up on using this selection.)					
17	165	Dan McGhee^{#}	PF/C	United States	Texas Chaparrals	Howard Payne (Sr.)
17	166	David Walls Jr.^{#}	PF/C	United States	Denver Rockets	Jackson State (Sr.)
17	167	Dan Fife^{#}	G	United States	Carolina Cougars	Michigan (Sr.)
17	168	Bill Drozdiak^{#}	F	United States	The Floridians	Oregon (Sr.)
17	169	Harry James^{#}	G	United States	Pittsburgh Condors	Montclair State (Sr.)
17	170	Haywood Hill^{#}	SG/SF	United States	Memphis Pros	Oral Roberts (Sr.)
17	171	Ollie Shannon^{#}	G	United States	New York Nets	Minnesota (Sr.)
17	Kentucky Colonels (Passed up on using this selection.)					
17	Virginia Squires (Passed up on using this selection.)					
17	172	Jim Irving^{#}	G	United States	Indiana Pacers	Saint Louis (Sr.)
17	Utah Stars (Passed up on using this selection.)					
18	Texas Chaparrals (Passed up on using this selection.)					
18	173	Paul Botts^{#}	G	United States	Denver Rockets	Central Michigan (Sr.)
18	174	Cliff Harris^{#}	F	United States	Carolina Cougars	Hardin–Simmons (Sr.)
18	175	Eddie Myers^{#}	C	United States	The Floridians	Arizona (Sr.)
18	176	John Novey^{#}	G	United States	Pittsburgh Condors	Mount St. Mary's (Sr.)
18	177	Reggie Wood^{#}	F	United States	Memphis Pros	College of Steubenville (Sr.)
18	178	Bob Doyle^{#}	SG	United States	New York Nets	UTEP (Sr.)
18	Kentucky Colonels (Passed up on using this selection.)					
18	Virginia Squires (Passed up on using this selection.)					
18	179	Bob Bissant^{#}	G	United States	Indiana Pacers	Loyola (New Orleans) (Sr.)
18	Utah Stars (Passed up on using this selection.)					
19	Texas Chaparrals (Passed up on using this selection.)					
19	180	Ron Smith^{#}	C	United States	Denver Rockets	Wichita State (Sr.)
19	181	Steve Bilsky^{#}	PG	United States	Carolina Cougars	Pennsylvania (Sr.)
19	182	Steve Sims^{#}	SG	United States	The Floridians	Pepperdine (Sr.)
19	Pittsburgh Condors (Passed up on using this selection.)					
19	183	Billy Barnes^{#}	PF/C	United States	Memphis Pros	Southern State (Sr.)
19	184	Calvin Oliver^{#}	F	United States	New York Nets	Pan American (Sr.)
19	Kentucky Colonels (Passed up on using this selection.)					
19	Virginia Squires (Passed up on using this selection.)					
19	185	Rudy Benjamin^{#}	G	United States	Indiana Pacers	Michigan State (Sr.)
19	Utah Stars (Passed up on using this selection.)					
20	Texas Chaparrals (Passed up on using this selection.)					
20	186	Bobby Jones^{#}	G	United States	Denver Rockets	Drake (Sr.)
20	Carolina Cougars (Passed up on using this selection.)					
20	187	Pat Biber^{#}	F	United States	The Floridians	Tampa (Sr.)
20	Pittsburgh Condors (Passed up on using this selection.)					
20	188	Allan Dalton^{#}	G	United States	Memphis Pros	Suffolk (Sr.)
20	189	Greg Cluess^{#}	C/PF	United States	New York Nets	St. John's (Jr.)
20	Kentucky Colonels (Passed up on using this selection.)					
20	Virginia Squires (Passed up on using this selection.)					
20	190	Slick Pinkham^{#}	PG	United States	Indiana Pacers	DePauw ("Sr.")
20	Utah Stars (Passed up on using this selection.)					

=== Notable undrafted players ===
These players were officially considered draft eligible for the 1971 ABA draft and went undrafted this year, yet played at least one regular season or playoff game for the ABA before the ABA-NBA merger actually commenced a few years later when it actually happened in 1976.

Player	Pos.	Nationality	School/Club team
Jerry Dover	PG	United States	LeMoyne–Owen (Sr.)
Julius Erving^‡	SF	United States	UMass (Jr.)
George McGinnis^‡	PF	United States	Indiana (Jr.)
Johnny Neumann	SG/SF	United States	Ole Miss (So.)
Pete Smith	PF	United States	Hartford Capitols (EBA)

=== 1971 ABA special circumstances draft ===
The ABA would also host a "Special Circumstances" Draft later in the year on September 10, 1971 in Memphis, Tennessee (home of the Memphis Pros in what ultimately became the last time the ABA would ever host a draft event outside of their new headquarters located in New York) as a response to the (at the time) recently implemented "NBA Hardship Draft" that the NBA was forced to utilize following the results of the Spencer Haywood v. National Basketball Association 1971 Supreme Court case. Unlike the NBA's "Hardship Draft", which saw six players enter that specific draft for the first time ever (though only five of those players would get drafted by the NBA's teams), the ABA's "Special Circumstances Draft" only saw three players from that special draft get selected there: Duquesne University's Mickey Davis for the Denver Rockets in the second round, the University of California's Phil Chenier for the Carolina Cougars in the second round, and North Carolina State University's Ed Leftwich for the New York Nets in the fourth round; no players were selected during the first or third rounds in question for that event (though technically speaking, Mickey Davis would be considered the #1 pick of the Special Circumstances Draft that year). It is ultimately unknown how many players that the ABA had considered eligible for this particular draft were actually available during the time it happened. Nevertheless, there were no drafted choices in either the first round or the third round, meaning the listing below, including what their year in college was at the time of the selection for these players, is as such.

Denver Rockets

- Round 2, Pick 1 (#1): Mickey Davis, Duquesne University (Jr.)

Carolina Cougars

- Round 2, Pick 2 (#2): Phil Chenier, University of California (Jr.)

New York Nets

- Round 4, Pick 1 (#3): Ed Leftwich, North Carolina State University (Jr.)
