= Ron Dorsey =

Ron Dorsey may refer to:

- Ron Dorsey (basketball, born 1948), American former professional basketball player who was drafted in the 13th round of the 1971 NBA draft
- Ron Dorsey (basketball, born 1983), American professional basketball player who has played in Europe, Australia and New Zealand
