= Steve Bilsky =

American basketball player

Personal information
- Born: Roslyn, New York, U.S.
- Listed height: 5 ft 10 in (1.78 m)

Career information
- College: Penn (1968–1971)
- NBA draft: 1971: undrafted
- Position: Point guard

Career highlights
- UPI Little All-America (1971); First-team All-Ivy League (1970); 2× Second-team All-Ivy League (1969, 1971)

Steve Bilsky is an American former basketball player. Bilsky played college basketball at the University of Pennsylvania where he was a three-time All-Ivy League selection. He was selected in the 1971 ABA draft by the Carolina Cougars in the 19th round (181st overall) but never played in the league. Bilsky was inducted into the Philadelphia Jewish Sports Hall of Fame, Philadelphia Big Five Hall of Fame, and the Penn Athletics Hall of Fame.

== Biography ==
Bilsky holds a degree from Penn's Wharton Business School and a master's in counseling from the University of Oregon. At Oregon, he assisted coach Dick Harter in basketball. He played basketball professionally in Israel and joined Penn in 1976, serving in roles including academic counselor and assistant athletic director. He directed the Penn Relays and has played on championship teams across various levels. In 1982, Bilsky transitioned to George Washington University as the director of men's athletics.

As a player at the University of Pennsylvania, he earned the title of a three-time All-Ivy League guard and was captain of the 1970-71 team. He also holds a Penn record for the most free throws in a single game.

Beginning his administrative role in 1994, Bilsky contributed to the development of Penn's athletic facilities and increased alumni involvement in the athletic department. His contributions led to his inductions into the Philadelphia Big 5 and Penn Athletic Halls of Fame.

Bilsky retired in 2014.
