= Barry Yates =

American basketball player

Personal information
- Born: January 30, 1946 (age 80) Randolph, Iowa, U.S.
- Listed height: 6 ft 7 in (2.01 m)
- Listed weight: 215 lb (98 kg)

Career information
- High school: Fremont–Mills (Randolph, Iowa)
- College: Maryland (1970–1971)
- NBA draft: 1971: 8th round, 131st overall pick
- Drafted by: Philadelphia 76ers
- Playing career: 1971–1974
- Position: Power forward
- Number: 35

Career history
- 1971–1972: Philadelphia 76ers
- 1973–1974: Cherry Hill Rookies
- Stats at NBA.com
- Stats at Basketball Reference

Barry Yates (born January 30, 1946) is an American former professional basketball player. He played for the Philadelphia 76ers in 24 games during the 1971–72 NBA season.

Yates started his college basketball career with the Nebraska Cornhuskers where he played on the freshman team during the 1963–64 season. He spent the following five years in the United States Coast Guard. Yates joined the Maryland Terrapins in 1969 and redshirted his first season. He returned to playing in the 1970–71 season and averaged 13.2 points and 8.6 rebounds per game. Yates was selected as the 131st overall pick in the 1971 NBA draft by the Philadelphia 76ers. He chose to start his professional career despite having one additional year of collegiate eligibility remaining.

Yates played for the Cherry Hill Rookies of the Eastern Basketball Association (EBA) during the 1973–74 season.

== Career statistics ==
Legend
GP	Games played	GS	Games started	MPG	Minutes per game
FG%	Field goal percentage	3P%	3-point field goal percentage	FT%	Free throw percentage
RPG	Rebounds per game	APG	Assists per game	SPG	Steals per game
BPG	Blocks per game	PPG	Points per game	**Bold**	Career high

=== NBA ===
==== Regular season ====
Year	Team	GP	GS	MPG	FG%	FT%	RPG	APG	PPG
1971–72	Philadelphia	24	1	6.0	.373	.636	1.7	.3	2.9
