= Ed Owens =

American basketball player

Personal information
- Born: August 6, 1950 Omaha, Nebraska, U.S.
- Died: December 11, 1971 (aged 21) Near Cedar City, Utah, U.S.
- Listed height: 6 ft 9 in (2.06 m)

Career information
- High school: Ogden (Ogden, Utah)
- College: Southern Utah (1969–1970)
- NBA draft: 1971: undrafted
- Position: Forward

Edward Sinclair Owens (August 6, 1950 – December 11, 1971) was an American basketball player. He played college basketball for the Southern Utah Thunderbirds during the 1969–70 season and then transferred to Weber State University where he did not play. Owens entered the 1971 NBA hardship draft as a junior and was the only eligible player not selected by a team. He died in a car accident three months later.

== Early life ==
Owens was born in Omaha, Nebraska, to Harold and Bessie Mae West Owens. His parents both worked in public relations for a community group; his mother was a Howard University graduate who also later ran as a candidate in local government. The Owens family moved to Ogden, Utah, in 1956. Owens attended Ogden High School but did not play on the basketball team and did not graduate. He took an entrance examination and enrolled at Southern Utah University.

== College basketball career ==
Owens joined the Southern Utah Thunderbirds in 1969 and became the first black player on the team in the school's history. Thunderbirds head coach, Boyd Adams, felt that Owens had "all the innate ability to become a fine player." Adams tried to help Owens with his academics but believed "all he lived for was a chance to play pro basketball." Owens averaged 15.6 points and 13.6 rebounds per game with the Thunderbirds during the 1969–70 season. His rebounding count ranked in the top four of the Rocky Mountain Athletic Conference (RMAC) that season. Adams considered him to be the "finest big man" in the RMAC.

Owens transferred to Weber State University which was considered a better springboard for his basketball career. However, his participation on the Weber State Wildcats basketball team during the 1970–71 season was limited to workouts as he could not improve his grades enough to play.

== NBA draft ==
On September 1, 1971, Owens was announced as one of six players eligible in a hardship draft by the National Basketball Association (NBA). A junior in collegiate eligibility, his inclusion was decided by NBA commissioner, J. Walter Kennedy, after Owens applied. The hardship draft was conducted by Kennedy on a phone and went for 20 rounds with every team in the league passing after the 4th round; no team selected Owens. After the 12th round, one general manager joked, "Walter, why don't you hire him?" Kennedy explained later, "we carried the draft that many rounds because we always had, and thought somebody might have used it against us if we hadn't gone 20 rounds." Kennedy also stated that "there were a lot of people surprised that no one had taken a chance on Owens" as he had played well at Southern Utah despite missing his season at Weber State.

== Death ==
Owens returned to Southern Utah University after the draft to make another attempt at his academics. On December 11, 1971, he was killed in an accident near Cedar City, Utah, when his car rolled over. Kennedy received a three-page letter from Owens' mother after the accident in which she wrote: "One of the biggest moments in my son's life was your consideration as a hardship case. The last thing he asked me to do was to write and say thanks to you."
