= Isaiah Wilson (basketball) =

American basketball player (born 1948)

Personal information
- Born: May 31, 1948 (age 78) Philadelphia, Pennsylvania, U.S.
- Listed height: 6 ft 2 in (1.88 m)
- Listed weight: 175 lb (79 kg)

Career information
- High school: South Philadelphia (Philadelphia, Pennsylvania)
- College: Baltimore (1968–1971)
- NBA draft: 1971: 2nd round, 29th overall pick
- Drafted by: Detroit Pistons
- Playing career: 1971–1975
- Position: Shooting guard
- Number: 10

Career history
- 1971–1972: Detroit Pistons
- 1972–1973: Memphis Tams
- 1973: Allentown Jets
- 1973–1975: Cherry Hill Rookies
- Stats at NBA.com
- Stats at Basketball Reference

Isaiah "Bunny" Wilson (born May 31, 1948) is an American former professional basketball player who played in the National Basketball Association (NBA) and American Basketball Association (ABA). Wilson was selected with the twelfth pick in the second round of the 1971 NBA draft. He played in 48 games for the Detroit Pistons in the 1971-72 NBA season and averaged 3.5 points per game, 0.9 assists per game and 1.0 rebound per game. He also played one season in the ABA for the Memphis Tams and averaged 6.3 points per game, 2.4 assists per game and 1.3 rebounds per game.

Wilson played in the Eastern Basketball Association (EBA) from 1973 to 1975 with the Allentown Jets and Cherry Hill Rookies.

== Career statistics ==
Legend
GP	Games played	GS	Games started	MPG	Minutes per game
FG%	Field goal percentage	3P%	3-point field goal percentage	FT%	Free throw percentage
RPG	Rebounds per game	APG	Assists per game	SPG	Steals per game
BPG	Blocks per game	PPG	Points per game	**Bold**	Career high

=== NBA/ABA ===
==== Regular season ====
Year	Team	GP	MPG	FG%	3P%	FT%	RPG	APG	PPG
1971–72	Detroit (NBA)	**48**	6.7	.356		.732	1.0	.9	3.5
1972–73	Memphis (ABA)	30	**12.9**	**.428**	.375	**.797**	**1.3**	**2.4**	**6.3**
Career (overall)		78	9.1	.390	.375	.767	1.1	1.4	4.6
