= Cyril Baptiste =

American basketball player (1949–2006)

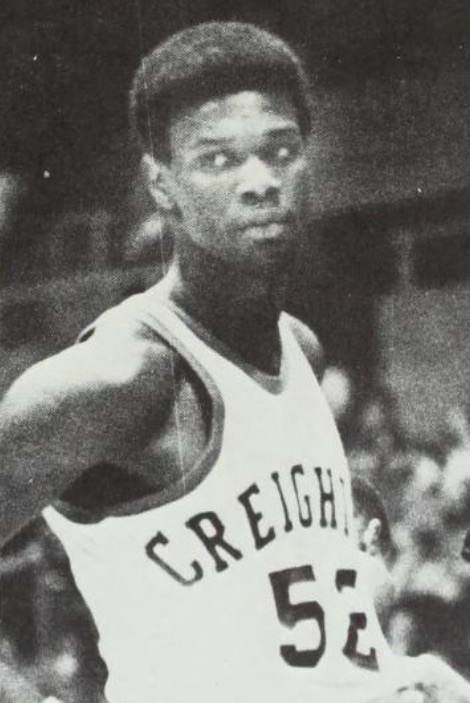
- Baptiste with the Creighton Bluejays during the 1970–71 season

Personal information
- Born: November 17, 1949 Miami, Florida, U.S.
- Died: August 14, 2006 (aged 56) Miami, Florida, U.S.
- Listed height: 6 ft 9 in (2.06 m)
- Listed weight: 230 lb (104 kg)

Career information
- High school: Archbishop Curley (Miami, Florida)
- College: Creighton (1969–1971)
- NBA draft: 1971: Hardship round, 3rd overall pick
- Drafted by: Golden State Warriors
- Position: Center

Career history
- 1973–1974; 1975–1976: Scranton Apollos

Career highlights
- Fourth-team Parade All-American (1968)
- Stats at Basketball Reference

Cyril Baptiste (November 17, 1949 – August 14, 2006) was an American professional basketball player. He played college basketball for the Creighton Bluejays for two seasons. Baptiste was selected by the Golden State Warriors as a hardship case in the 1971 NBA draft but did not make the team due to difficulties from a drug addiction. He played two seasons in the Eastern Basketball Association (EBA) with the Scranton Apollos.

== Early life ==
Baptiste's mother, Elsie Mae Baptiste, was of Bahamian descent. On March 20, 1954, Baptiste's father, Cyril, was killed after he suffered a fractured skull and two broken legs in a hit-and-run accident. Cyril had been at work and received a call that his wife had given birth; his family were waiting outside the hospital for his arrival and witnessed his death as he tried to cross the road to greet them. Elsie Mae worked 16 hours a day to support her four children.

Baptiste first aspired to become a professional basketball player in 1960 while he played on a court at Rainbow Park Elementary School. He attended Archbishop Curley High School. He was selected as a fourth-team Parade All-American in 1968. Baptiste was considered "perhaps the best basketball player ever produced in Dade County" and "potentially the greatest basketball player Miami has produced."

== College career ==
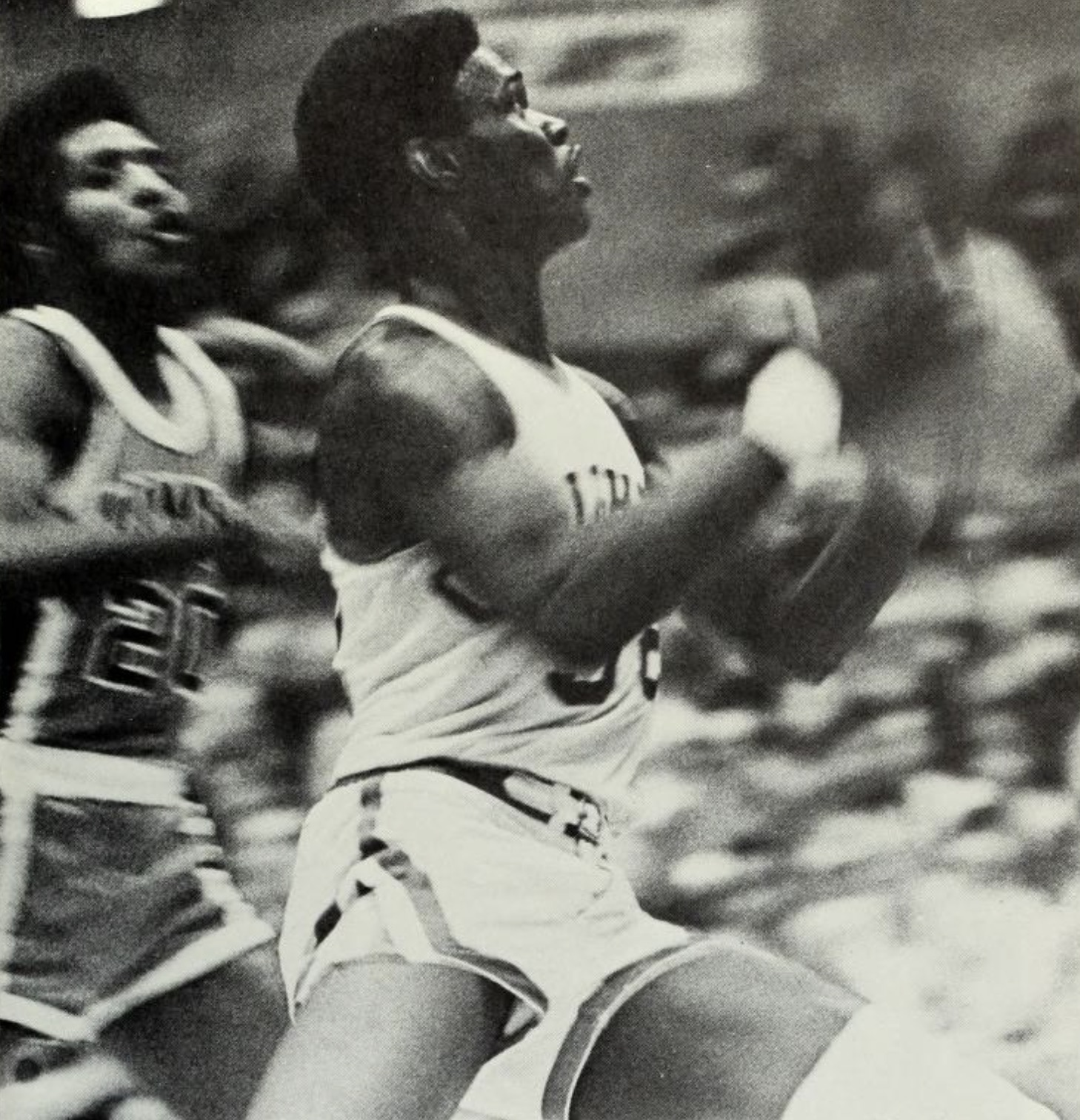
Baptiste drives past a defender during a game in the 1970–71 season

Baptiste enrolled at Creighton University with a full athletic scholarship to play basketball for the Bluejays. He was sometimes listed as high as 6-foot-10-inch (2.08 m) but claimed this height was fabricated to "psych out" other teams and he was actually only 6-foot-7-inch (2.01 m).

Baptiste toured with the Olympic development team before his sophomore season. Baptiste began to experiment with drugs during his sophomore season as part of an "innocent curiosity". He developed an addiction to heroin which caused weight loss and he claimed that he played while high his entire junior season. A decline in Baptiste's playing performance heightened the suspicions of head coach Eddie Sutton but physicals were unsuccessful in revealing anything untoward. Baptiste's interest in his college classes declined and he was assisted with his grades by Creighton until he dropped out of university two weeks after his junior season ended. Sutton lamented in 1989 that he "probably will never get another ballplayer with that much ability" as Baptiste.

== Professional career ==
Baptiste was made eligible for the 1971 NBA draft as part of a hardship round and was considered as a "glamour name". He was selected by the Golden State Warriors and signed a $450,000 contract. Baptiste was suspended in training camp before the 1971–72 NBA season for being "out of condition" and subsequently lost most of his contracted money. The Warriors sent Baptiste to several drug rehabilitation programs and kept him on their suspended list until he was placed on waivers on January 15, 1973. Warriors head coach, Al Attles, described the situation as "a tragedy" because Baptiste "seemed to be quite a nice person."

Baptiste played for the Scranton Apollos of the Eastern Basketball Association during the 1973–74 and 1975–76 seasons. He was sometimes paid only $150 per game. Baptiste injured his knee during a playoff game in 1974 and missed the entire 1974–75 season. He only showed up for 27 of the 33 games that the Apollos played during the 1975–76 season and head coach Stan Novak considered him as "unreliable." Baptiste averaged 11.3 points and 9.1 rebounds per game during the 1975–76 season. Novak stated that "ability-wise, [Baptiste] can play in the NBA" but "he has a hard time dealing with life."

In 1974, Baptiste believed that he could make a return to the National Basketball Association (NBA) despite his history of drug-related arrests and a conviction for arson. In a 1979 interview, Baptiste claimed that Golden State Warriors owner, Franklin Mieuli, told him "there was a rumor going around that [he] had been blackballed out of the NBA."

Baptiste also played in Israel, Germany, Switzerland and Venezuela.

In 1977, Baptiste participated in training camp for the Miami Dolphins of the National Football League (NFL).

== Personal life ==
Baptiste's two brothers, Leroy and Arnie, also played college basketball. Leroy played for the Creighton Bluejays alongside Baptiste. Arnie had also wanted to play for the Bluejays but was only offered a conditional scholarship and placed on probation; he instead played at Arizona Western College and Biscayne College (now St. Thomas University).

== Death ==
Baptiste died on August 14, 2006, at the age of 56 due to prostate cancer.

== Career statistics ==
Legend
| GP | Games played | GS | Games started | MPG | Minutes per game |
| FG% | Field goal percentage | 3P% | 3-point field goal percentage | FT% | Free throw percentage |
| RPG | Rebounds per game | APG | Assists per game | SPG | Steals per game |
| BPG | Blocks per game | PPG | Points per game | **Bold** | Career high |

=== College ===
| Year | Team | GP | GS | MPG | FG% | 3P% | FT% | RPG | APG | SPG | BPG | PPG |
|---|---|---|---|---|---|---|---|---|---|---|---|---|
| 1969–70 | Creighton | **24** | – | – | .514 | – | .561 | **11.7** | – | – | – | 18.9 |
| 1970–71 | Creighton | **24** | – | **32.7** | **.530** | – | **.651** | 11.3 | **1.0** | – | – | **20.3** |
| Career | | 48 | – | 32.7 | .522 | – | .606 | 11.5 | 1.0 | – | – | 19.6 |
