= Joe Hammond (basketball) =

American basketball player

Personal information
- Born: Harlem, New York, U.S.
- Listed height: 6 ft 4 in (1.93 m)
- Listed weight: 175 lb (79 kg)

Career information
- High school: Taft (The Bronx, New York)
- NBA draft: 1971: Hardship round, 5th overall pick
- Drafted by: Los Angeles Lakers
- Playing career: 1969–1973
- Position: Guard

Career history
- 1969–1971: Allentown Jets
- 1972–1973: Garden State Colonials

Career highlights
- EPBL champion (1970)
- Stats at Basketball Reference

Joe Hammond, nicknamed "The Destroyer", is an American former streetball basketball player based in Harlem, New York. He attended Taft High School in the Bronx, but he dropped out of school in the 9th grade and thus never played college basketball. He played professionally in the Eastern Basketball Association (EBA) with the Allentown Jets and Garden State Colonials. He won an EPBL championship with the Jets in 1970. He was named in ESPN's "Elite 24: Rucker Park legends".

== Career ==
A streetball player, Hammond once scored 50 points in a half against Julius Erving at Rucker Park. In the 1971 NBA hardship draft, he was selected with the fifth pick of the 1971 Early Entry draft by the Los Angeles Lakers. He also turned down a three-year contract to play in the American Basketball Association.

He was arrested for dealing drugs and was sentenced to 11 years in prison. In 1990, he was described as being the best streetball player ever by The New York Times. He later sued Nike and Foot Locker for $5 million for using his image without his permission.
