= Marvin Stewart (basketball) =

American basketball player

Personal information
- Born: Chicago, Illinois, U.S.
- Listed height: 6 ft 3 in (1.91 m)
- Listed weight: 180 lb (82 kg)

Career information
- High school: Dunbar (Chicago, Illinois)
- College: Nebraska (1968–1971)
- NBA draft: 1971: 2nd round, 33rd overall pick
- Drafted by: Philadelphia 76ers
- Position: Guard

Career highlights
- First-team All-Big Eight (1971)
- Stats at Basketball Reference

Marvin Stewart is an American former basketball player. He played at Dunbar Vocational High School in his hometown of Chicago, Illinois. Stewart played collegiately for the Nebraska Cornhuskers from 1968 to 1971, where he is known as "one of the finest fast-breaking guards" in program history. During his senior season in 1970–71, he became the first Cornhuskers player to average 20 points per game in a season and was named to the first-team All-Big Eight.

Stewart was selected by the Philadelphia 76ers as the 33rd overall pick in the 1971 NBA draft but never played in the National Basketball Association (NBA). He was elected to the Nebraska Basketball Hall of Fame in 1992.
