= Jackie Ridgle =

American basketball player

Personal information
- Born: February 13, 1948 Altheimer, Arkansas, U.S.
- Died: August 26, 1998 (aged 50) Altheimer, Arkansas, U.S.
- Listed height: 6 ft 4 in (1.93 m)
- Listed weight: 195 lb (88 kg)

Career information
- High school: Martin (Altheimer, Arkansas)
- College: California (1968–1971)
- NBA draft: 1971: 3rd round, 41st overall pick
- Drafted by: Cleveland Cavaliers
- Position: Shooting guard
- Number: 23

Career history
- 1971–1972: Cleveland Cavaliers

Career highlights
- 3× Second-team All-Pac-8 (1969–1971)
- Stats at NBA.com
- Stats at Basketball Reference

Jackie Lendell Ridgle (February 13, 1948 – August 26, 1998) was an American professional basketball player. He played college basketball for the California Golden Bears and played for the Cleveland Cavaliers during the 1971–72 Cavaliers season. In 32 career games, he averaged 3.3 minutes and 1.8 points per game.

== Career statistics ==
Legend
GP	Games played	GS	Games started	MPG	Minutes per game
FG%	Field goal percentage	3P%	3-point field goal percentage	FT%	Free throw percentage
RPG	Rebounds per game	APG	Assists per game	SPG	Steals per game
BPG	Blocks per game	PPG	Points per game	**Bold**	Career high

=== NBA ===
==== Regular season ====
Year	Team	GP	MPG	FG%	FT%	RPG	APG	PPG
1971–72	Cleveland	32	3.3	.432	.731	.5	.2	1.8
