= Gregg Northington =

American basketball player

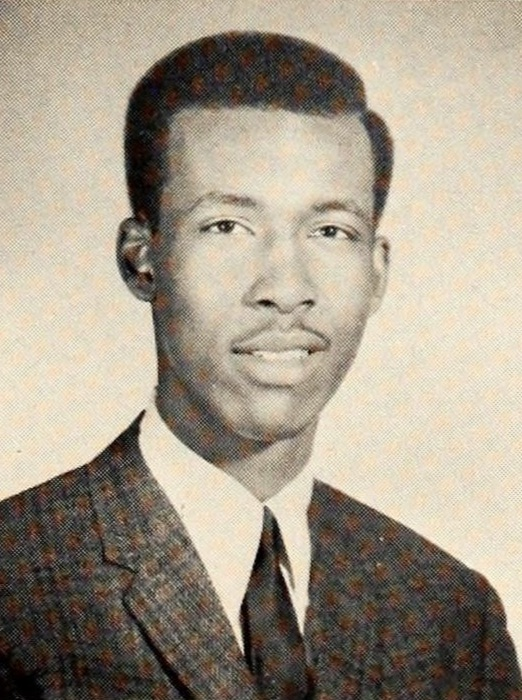
- Northington in 1967

Personal information
- Born: c. 1948 Indianapolis, Indiana, U.S.
- Died: February 11, 2017 (aged 68) Indianapolis, Indiana, U.S.
- Listed height: 7 ft 1 in (2.16 m)
- Listed weight: 238 lb (108 kg)

Career information
- High school: Harry E. Wood (Indianapolis, Indiana)
- College: Murray State College (1967–1968); Paul Quinn (1968–1969); Alabama State (1969–1972)
- NBA draft: 1972: 3rd round, 47th overall pick
- Drafted by: Los Angeles Lakers
- Position: Center

Career highlights
- 2× First-team All-SIAC (1971, 1972); 2× Fourth-team Parade All-American (1966, 1967)
- Stats at Basketball Reference

Greggory D. "Poncho" Northington (c. 1948 – February 11, 2017) was an American professional basketball player. He played college basketball for the Murray State College Aggies, Paul Quinn Tigers and Alabama State Hornets. Northington was selected in the 1971 NBA draft by the New York Knicks and the 1972 NBA draft by the Los Angeles Lakers but did not play in the National Basketball Association (NBA). He instead played professionally in Mexico, France and the Netherlands.

== Early life ==
Northington was nicknamed "Poncho" by his mother when he was a child. He was raised in a ghetto in Indianapolis, Indiana, and came from a broken family. Northington started playing basketball at the age of nine.

Northington attended Harry E. Wood High School in Indianapolis. His high school basketball coach, Jumping Johnny Wilson, recollected Northington when he joined the school as being "a loner and very, very shy." Northington was self-conscious because of his height – standing 6 ft 3 in (1.91 m) as a freshman - and he did not have nice clothes to wear like his classmates. Wilson said that Northington "had to work hard at everything; schoolwork, basketball and even learning to talk to people." Northington lived at Wilson's house for part of his high school career; Wilson sometimes did not know where Northington otherwise stayed.

Northington claimed to have not blossomed as a basketball player until his final two years of high school. He set an Indianapolis season scoring record during his senior year with 27.9 points per game to surpass the previous record held by Oscar Robertson. Northington also established himself as an outstanding defensive player.

== College career ==
Northington received interest from 500 colleges but decided to start his college career at a small school. He committed to Murray State College in Tishomingo, Oklahoma. With a 17–1 record, Northington was leading the team in scoring and rebounding when he was ruled academically ineligible in February 1968 because of his semester grades. He chose to leave the team after arguing with his coach about trying out for the 1968 Olympics basketball team.

Northington transferred to Paul Quinn College in Waco, Texas. On February 25, 1969, he recorded 40 points and 29 rebounds in a game against Mississippi Industrial College. Paul Quinn dropped its intercollegiate athletics program at the end of the season in 1969. Northington became friends with Bernard Boozer who was being hired by Alabama State University to become head coach of the Hornets basketball team. He followed Boozer to the team where he was paired alongside another 7 ft 0 in (2.13 m) player in Lawrence Lilly.

Northington averaged 30 points and 19.7 rebounds per game during the 1970–71 season. He was automatically eligible for the 1971 NBA draft because he had graduated from high school four years earlier and was selected in the second round by the New York Knicks. Northington was also selected in the third round of the American Basketball Association (ABA) draft by the Carolina Cougars but claimed that they were "talking so crazy that [he] didn't want anything to do with them." He was unable to agree on a salary with the Knicks and elected to return to the Hornets for his senior season.

Northington averaged 27.8 points and 17.2 rebounds during the 1971–72 season. Boozer noted that it was a decline from his previous season which Northington attributed to putting on weight in preparation for his attempt at turning professional.

The Hornets went 63–18 during Northington's three-year tenure. He scored a total of 2,191 points and 1,426 rebounds for an average of 29.2 points and 19.0 rebounds per game. He was selected to the All-Southern Intercollegiate Athletic Conference (SIAC) first-team in 1971 and 1972. Northington said that he enjoyed playing for the Hornets team but was not fond of the student fanbase who he believed "just came out because they didn't have anything else to do at that particular time" and "could talk about [him] and Lawrence [Lilly]" like they "were some kind of circus freaks."

== Professional career ==
Although Northington was expected to be a first-round draft pick in the 1972 NBA draft, he was selected in the third round by the Los Angeles Lakers who wanted a big man to understudy Wilt Chamberlain. Northington said that the Lakers "acted like they didn't have nothing to give" because of other players asking for pay rises and he was not able to negotiate on a contract. The Portland Trail Blazers were interested in Northington but the Lakers asked for too much for a deal to be made. Northington did not make it to rookie camp and ultimately never played in the National Basketball Association (NBA).

Northington started his career in Mexico and then moved to France. He played for a team in Amsterdam for eight months where he was given a $17,000 contract, a furnished apartment and a car. Northington returned to the United States in September 1978 and started working as a radio broadcaster for the Hornets in February 1979. He reflected on his professional basketball career in a 1979 interview: "I think I could have been a good player in the NBA. I won't ever play in the NBA, not now, anyway. I'm not putting myself down, but a team would want to go with a younger player than sign me."

== Later life ==
Northington lived in Indianapolis. He worked for the Indiana Department of Correction. Northington married his wife, Dorothy Baker, in 1992.

Northington died in Indianapolis on February 11, 2017, aged 68.
