= Odis Allison =

American basketball player (1949–2022)

Personal information
- Born: October 2, 1949 Tulare, California, U.S.
- Died: July 30, 2022 (aged 72) Las Vegas, Nevada, U.S.
- Listed height: 6 ft 6 in (1.98 m)
- Listed weight: 195 lb (88 kg)

Career information
- High school: McClymonds (Oakland, California)
- College: UNLV (1969–1971)
- NBA draft: 1971: 5th round, 76th overall pick
- Drafted by: Golden State Warriors
- Playing career: 1971–1972
- Position: Small forward
- Number: 22

Career history
- 1971–1972: Golden State Warriors

Career NBA statistics
- Points: 67 (1.9 ppg)
- Rebounds: 45 (1.3 rpg)
- Assists: 10 (0.3 apg)
- Stats at NBA.com
- Stats at Basketball Reference

Odis Jackson Allison Jr. (October 2, 1949 – July 30, 2022) was an American basketball player.

Born in Tulare, California, Allison played collegiately for the University of Nevada, Las Vegas from 1969 to 1971. At UNLV, Allison led the team in scoring for the 1969–70 season with 19.0 ppg. He was selected as a second-team WCAC all-conference forward in 1970 and 1971. In 2010, The Las Vegas Review-Journal named Allison the 43rd best player in UNLV history.

He was selected by the Golden State Warriors in the 5th round (76th pick overall) of the 1971 NBA draft. He played for the Warriors in the NBA (1971–72) for 36 games.

After his playing career, Allison worked in automotive sales and also coached basketball. He was an assistant coach on Jerry Tarkanian's 1976-77 UNLV team that made the Final Four in the NCAA Men's Basketball Tournament. He also served as the head coach at Contra Costa College for a number of years.

== Career statistics ==
Legend
| GP | Games played | GS | Games started | MPG | Minutes per game |
| FG% | Field goal percentage | 3P% | 3-point field goal percentage | FT% | Free throw percentage |
| RPG | Rebounds per game | APG | Assists per game | SPG | Steals per game |
| BPG | Blocks per game | PPG | Points per game | **Bold** | Career high |

=== NBA ===
==== Regular season ====
| Year | Team | GP | MPG | FG% | FT% | RPG | APG | PPG |
|---|---|---|---|---|---|---|---|---|
| 1971–72 | Golden State | 36 | 4.6 | .218 | .541 | 1.3 | .3 | 1.9 |
