= Héctor Blondet =

Puerto Rican basketball player

Hector "El Mago" Blondet-Texidor (May 12, 1947 in Brooklyn, New York City – September 9, 2006 in Puerto Rico) was a Puerto Rican professional basketball player who in the 1970s played with the "Cardenales de Rio Piedras" and the "Capitanes de Arecibo" teams in the National Basketball League in Puerto Rico. He played three years at Murray State University in Murray, Kentucky, and was drafted in 1971 as a fifth round pick by the NBA's Portland Trail Blazers. Blondet was also selected in that year as a tenth-round pick by the ABA's Virginia Squires, but he never played for either team despite signing a contract for Portland.

During that time, he was also the shooting guard of the Puerto Rican national basketball team, leading the team to a 6th place at the 1972 Olympics in Munich, where he scored 150 points in nine games. Four years later, he took his team to a 9th place at the 1976 Olympics in Montreal. Before this, Blondet had also helped Puerto Rico win the silver medal at the 1971 Pan American Games.

Blondet was 1.96m tall and weighed 91 kg.

He was buried at the New Cemetery of Morovis.
