= Dana Pagett =

American basketball player

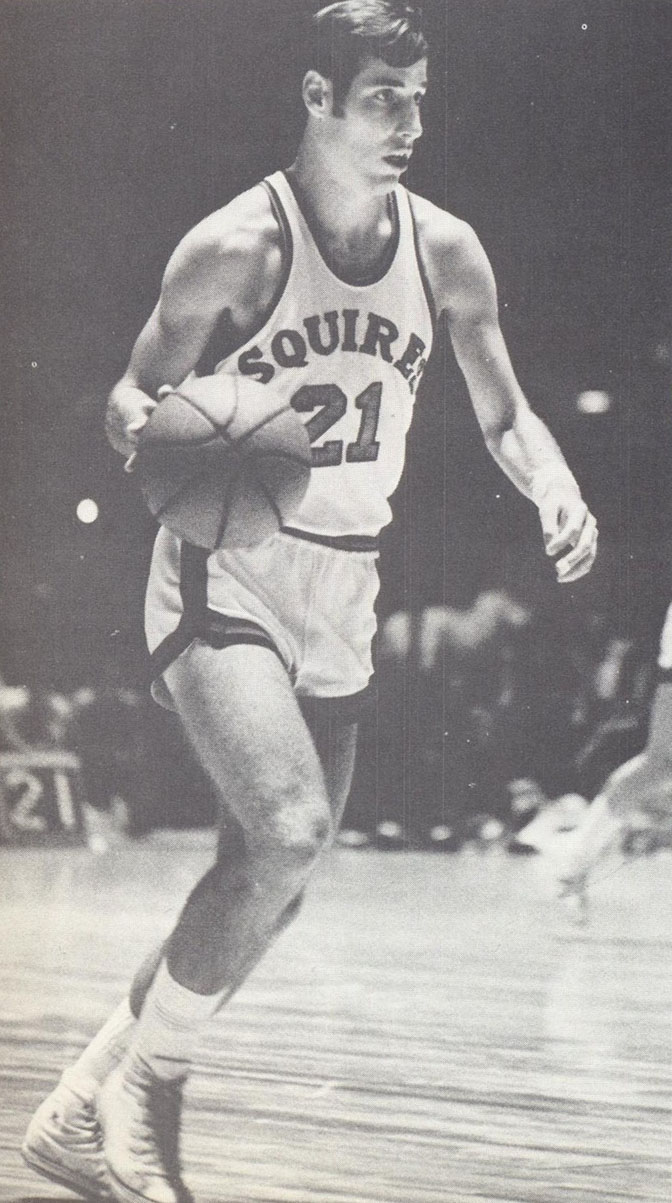
- Pagett during his tenure with the Virginia Squires.

Personal information
- Born: March 29, 1949 (age 77) El Segundo, California, U.S.
- Listed height: 6 ft 2 in (1.88 m)
- Listed weight: 180 lb (82 kg)

Career information
- High school: El Segundo (El Segundo, California)
- College: USC (1968–1971)
- NBA draft: 1971: 11th round, 178th overall pick
- Drafted by: Philadelphia 76ers
- Position: Guard
- Number: 21

Career history
- 1971: Virginia Squires

Career highlights
- Second-team Parade All-American (1967)
- Stats at Basketball Reference

Dana P. Pagett (born March 29, 1949) is an American former professional basketball player who spent one season in the American Basketball Association (ABA) as a member of the Virginia Squires during the 1971–72 season. He attended University of Southern California where he was drafted by the Philadelphia 76ers during the eleventh round of the 1971 NBA draft. After that season he signed with the Portland Trail Blazers, but was released before the start of the 1972–73 National Basketball Association (NBA) season. He was an assistant coach for the Loyola Marymount Lions, Long Beach State 49ers and Utah State Aggies men's basketball teams. He was also the assistant coach for Rancho Santiago Community College District men's basketball team and was later promoted to the head coach position.
