= Pete Smith (basketball) =

American basketball player

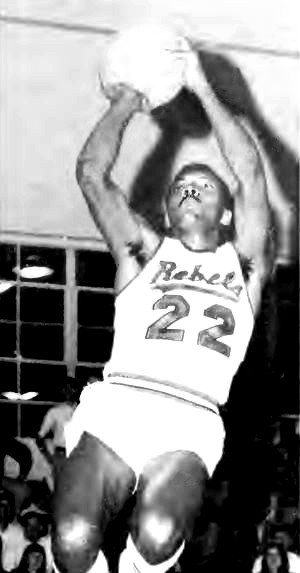
- Smith with the Valdosta State Rebels during the 1968–69 season

Personal information
- Born: 1947 (age 78–79) Albany, Georgia, U.S.
- Listed height: 6 ft 6 in (1.98 m)
- Listed weight: 205 lb (93 kg)

Career information
- College: Valdosta State (1968–1969)
- NBA draft: 1971: 13th round, 197th overall pick
- Drafted by: Buffalo Braves
- Playing career: 1970–1976
- Position: Power forward
- Number: 53

Career history
- 1970–1971: Hartford Capitols
- 1971–1972: Cherry Hill Demons
- 1972: San Diego Conquistadors
- 1974–1975: Allentown Jets
- 1975–1976: Wilkes-Barre Barons
- Stats at Basketball Reference

Pete Smith (born 1947) is an American former professional basketball player.

Smith was born in Albany, Georgia, and grew up in the rural southern area of the state. He joined the Cincinnati Bearcats to play college basketball but returned to Georgia without playing due to homesickness. Smith instead played for the Valdosta State Blazers, where he was the first black athlete in the school's history. He led the team in points, and set school records for most field goals attempted and best rebound average during his only season with the Blazers. Smith was drafted by the Buffalo Braves as the 197th overall pick of the 1971 NBA draft. He played five games in the American Basketball Association (ABA) as a member of the San Diego Conquistadors during the 1972–73 season. Smith spent time in training camp with the Atlanta Hawks of the National Basketball Association (NBA) but never played in an NBA game. He was one of the final cuts of the New York Nets of the ABA before the start of the 1975–76 season.

Smith played four seasons in the Eastern Basketball Association (EBA) with the Hartford Capitols, Cherry Hill Demons, Allentown Jets and Wilkes-Barre Barons.

Smith worked as a truck driver in Atlanta after his retirement from basketball. His son, Josh Smith, played professionally in the NBA.
