= 1971 NBA draft =

Basketball player selection

General information
- Sport: Basketball
- Dates: March 29, 1971 (first 10 rounds); March 30, 1971 (remaining rounds)
- Location: New York City, New York

Overview
- 237 total selections in 19 rounds
- League: NBA
- First selection: Austin Carr, Cleveland Cavaliers
- Hall of Famers: 2: F Spencer Haywood; C Artis Gilmore

The 1971 NBA draft was the 25th annual draft of the National Basketball Association (NBA). The draft was held on March 29 and 30, 1971, before the 1971–72 season. In this draft, 17 NBA teams took turns selecting amateur U.S. college basketball players and other eligible players, including international players. A player who had finished his four-year college eligibility was eligible for selection. If a player left college early, he would not be eligible for selection until his college class graduated. The first two picks in the draft belonged to the teams that finished last in each conference, with the order determined by a coin flip. The Cleveland Cavaliers won the coin flip and were awarded the first overall pick, while the Portland Trail Blazers were awarded the second pick. The remaining first-round picks and the subsequent rounds were assigned to teams in reverse order of their win–loss record in the previous season. Prior to the start of the season, the San Diego Rockets and the San Francisco Warriors relocated to Houston, Texas, and Oakland, California, and became the Houston Rockets and Golden State Warriors respectively. The draft consisted of 19 rounds comprising the selection of 237 players. The league also hosted a supplemental hardship draft on September 20, 1971, for college underclassmen who wished to join the league.

== Draft selections and draftee career notes ==
Austin Carr from the University of Notre Dame was selected first overall by the Cleveland Cavaliers. Sidney Wicks from the University of California, Los Angeles, who went on to win the Rookie of the Year Award in his first season, was selected second by the Portland Trail Blazers.

Spencer Haywood, the 30th pick, and Randy Smith, the 104th pick, were selected to both the All-NBA Team and the All-Star Game. Haywood was selected to four All-NBA Teams and five All-Star Games. He also won the NBA championship with the Los Angeles Lakers in 1980. During his first and only season in the American Basketball Association (ABA), he won the ABA Most Valuable Player Award, and was selected to the ABA All-Star Game and All-ABA Team. Smith was selected to one All-NBA Team and two All-Star Games.

Artis Gilmore, the 117th pick, initially opted to play in the ABA. Gilmore spent five seasons with the Kentucky Colonels before finally joined the NBA in 1976 after both leagues merged. His achievements include ABA Most Valuable Player Award in 1972, five All-ABA Team selections, five ABA All-Star Game selections and six NBA All-Star Game selections. For his achievements, he was inducted to the Basketball Hall of Fame in 2011.

Fred Brown, the 6th pick, spent all of his 13-year playing career with the Sonics and was selected to one All-Star Game. Carr, Wicks, and 11th pick Curtis Rowe are the only other players from this draft who were selected to an All-Star Game. Phil Chenier, a college underclassman selected in the supplemental hardship draft, was also selected to both All-NBA Team and All-Star Game. Two players drafted went on to have coaching careers in the NBA: 13th pick Jim Cleamons and 46th pick Dave Wohl.

Spencer Haywood was selected in the second round by the Buffalo Braves although he already played in the NBA with the Seattle SuperSonics in the previous season. He left college basketball in 1969 with two years remaining in his college eligibility. At that time, the NBA prohibited the drafting or signing of a player before his college class had graduated. He then played in the ABA with the Denver Rockets for a season before controversially signed by the Sonics. The league and the other NBA teams opposed the move and argued Haywood should be prohibited to join and play with the Sonics. This led to a court case between the NBA against the Sonics and Haywood. He argued that he should be allowed to play because he was a "hardship case", due to his position as the sole wage earner in his family. He then won the case and was allowed to play late in the 1970–71 season. This led to the NBA allowing college underclassmen to enter the draft provided they could give evidence of "hardship". With the existing rules, Haywood was eligible for this year's draft, when his college class graduated. The Braves used one of their three second-round picks to select him, hoping that they would win the rights to sign him. However, he remained with the Sonics and never played for the Braves.

== Key ==
Pos.	G	F	C
Position	Guard	Forward	Center

^	Denotes player who has been inducted to the Naismith Memorial Basketball Hall of Fame
*	Denotes player who has been selected for at least one All-Star Game and All-NBA Team
^{+}	Denotes player who has been selected for at least one All-Star Game
^{#}	Denotes player who has never appeared in an NBA regular-season or playoff game
^{~}	Denotes player who has been selected as Rookie of the Year

== Draft ==
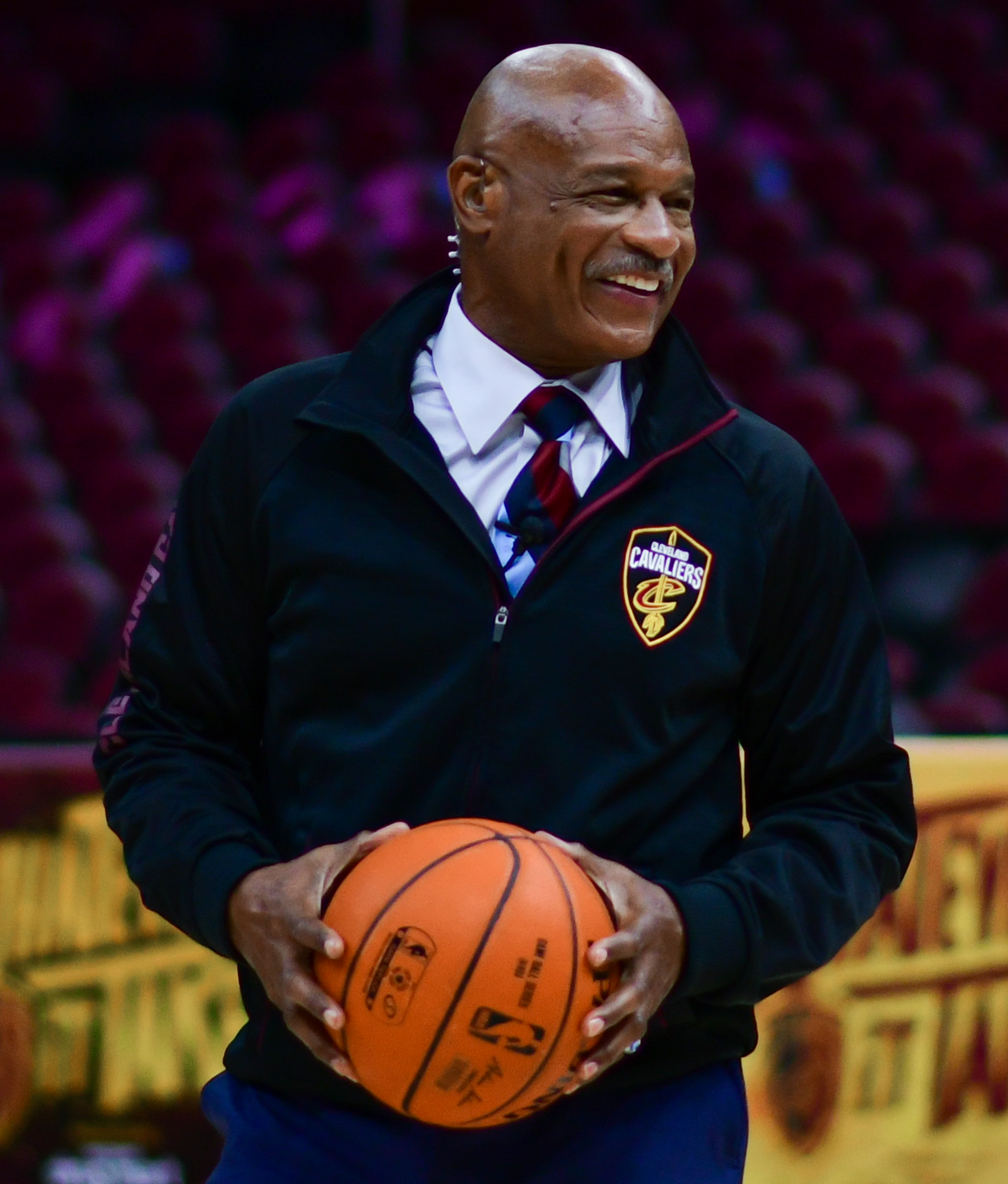
Austin Carr was the first overall pick by the Cleveland Cavaliers.

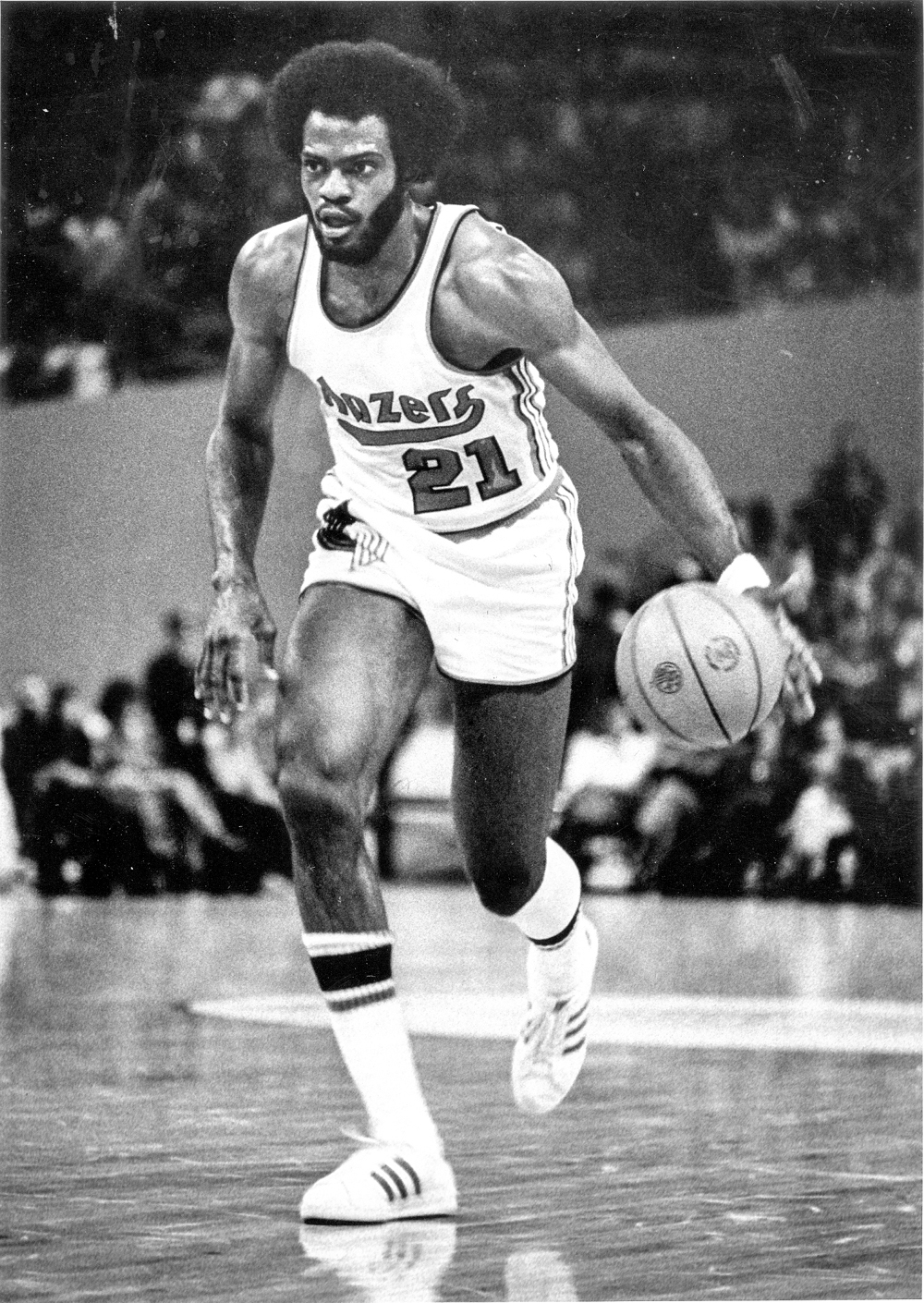
Sidney Wicks was selected 2nd overall by the Portland Trail Blazers and was named 1972 NBA Rookie of the Year.

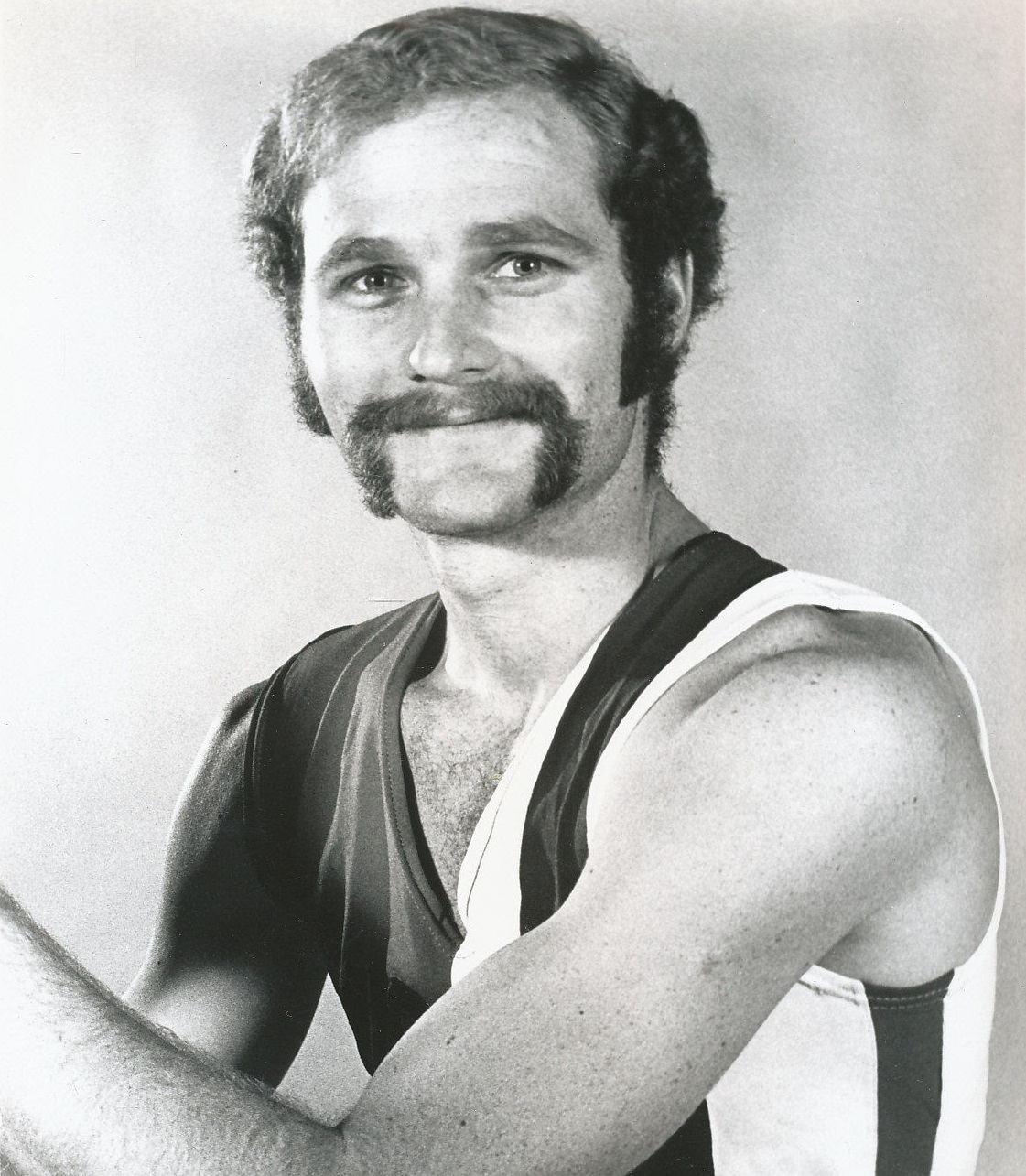
Stan Love was selected 9th overall by the Baltimore Bullets.

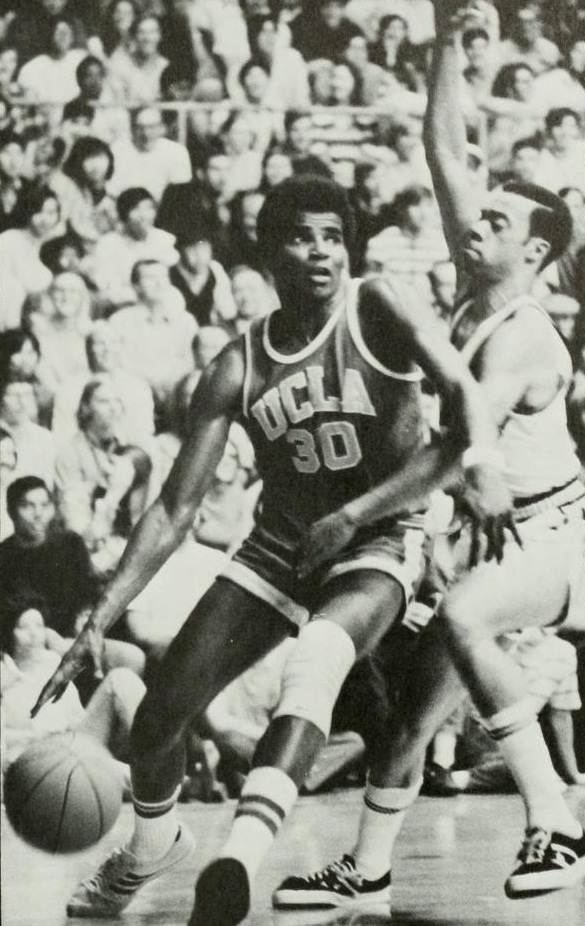
Curtis Rowe was selected 11th overall by the Detroit Pistons.

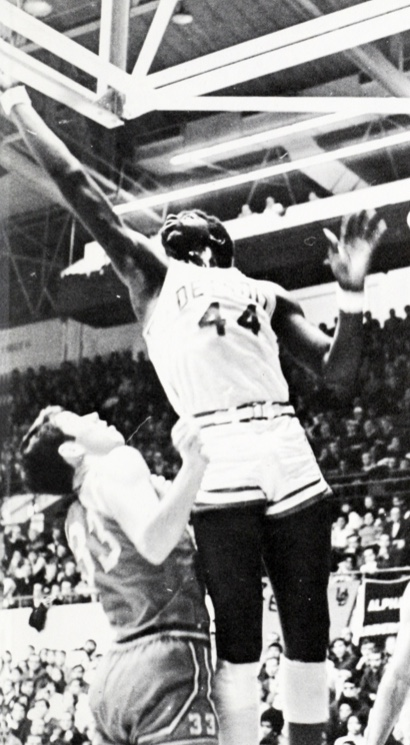
Spencer Haywood was selected 30th overall by the Buffalo Braves.

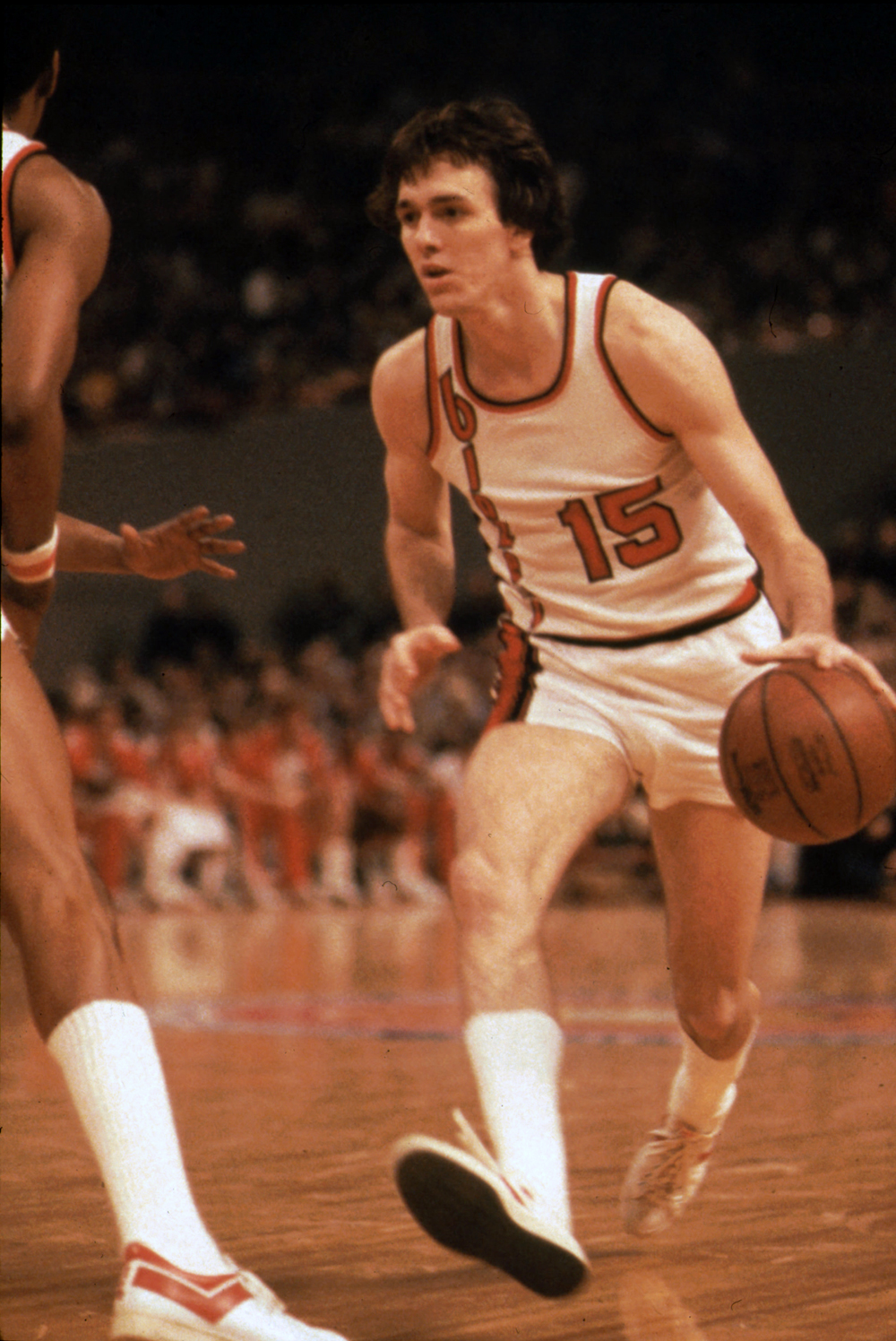
Larry Steele was selected 37th overall by the Portland Trail Blazers.

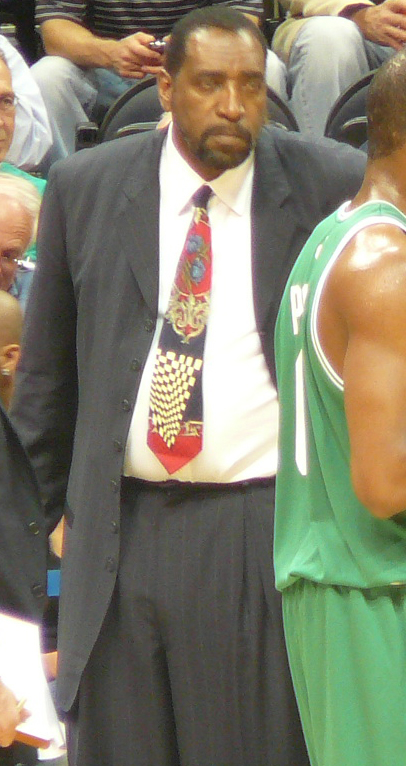
Clifford Ray was selected in 40th overall by the Chicago Bulls.

Round	Pick	Player	Pos.	Nationality	Team	School/club team
1	1	Austin Carr^{+}	G	United States	Cleveland Cavaliers	Notre Dame (Sr.)
1	2	Sidney Wicks^{+}^{~}	F/C	United States	Portland Trail Blazers	UCLA (Sr.)
1	3	Elmore Smith	C	United States	Buffalo Braves	Kentucky State (Sr.)
1	4	Ken Durrett	F	United States	Cincinnati Royals	La Salle (Sr.)
1	5	George Trapp	F/C	United States	Atlanta Hawks	Long Beach State (Sr.)
1	6	Fred Brown^{+}	G	United States	Seattle SuperSonics	Iowa (Sr.)
1	7	Cliff Meely	F/C	United States	San Diego Rockets	Colorado (Sr.)
1	8	Darnell Hillman	F/C	United States	San Francisco Warriors	U.S. Armed Forces (AAU)
1	9	Stan Love	F	United States	Baltimore Bullets	Oregon (Sr.)
1	10	Clarence Glover	F	United States	Boston Celtics	Western Kentucky (Sr.)
1	11	Curtis Rowe^{+}	F	United States	Detroit Pistons	UCLA (Sr.)
1	12	Dana Lewis^{#}	C	United States	Philadelphia 76ers	Tulsa (Sr.)
1	13	Jim Cleamons	G	United States	Los Angeles Lakers	Ohio State (Sr.)
1	14	John Roche	G	United States	Phoenix Suns	South Carolina (Sr.)
1	15	Kennedy McIntosh	F	United States	Chicago Bulls	Eastern Michigan (Sr.)
1	16	Dean Meminger	G	United States	New York Knicks	Marquette (Sr.)
1	17	Collis Jones^{#}	F	United States	Milwaukee Bucks	Notre Dame (Sr.)
2	18	Steve Patterson	C	United States	Cleveland Cavaliers	UCLA (Sr.)
2	19	Fred Hilton	G/F	United States	Buffalo Braves	Grambling (Sr.)
2	20	Willie Sojourner^{#}	F/C	United States	Chicago Bulls (from Portland)^{[a]}	Weber State (Sr.)
2	21	John Mengelt	G	United States	Cincinnati Royals	Auburn (Sr.)
2	22	Ted McClain	G	United States	Atlanta Hawks	Tennessee State (Sr.)
2	23	Jim McDaniels	F/C	United States	Seattle SuperSonics	Western Kentucky (Sr.)
2	24	Mike Newlin	G/F	United States	San Diego Rockets	Utah (Sr.)
2	25	Charlie Yelverton	G/F	United States	Portland Trail Blazers (from San Francisco)^{[b]}	Fordham (Sr.)
2	26	Amos Thomas^{#}	F	United States	Buffalo Braves	Southwestern State (Sr.)
2	27	Rick Fisher^{#}	F	United States	Portland Trail Blazers (from Baltimore)^{[c]}	Colorado State (Sr.)
2	28	Jim Rose^{#}	G	United States	Boston Celtics	Western Kentucky (Sr.)
2	29	Isaiah Wilson	G	United States	Detroit Pistons	Baltimore (Sr.)
2	30	Spencer Haywood^	F/C	United States	Buffalo Braves (from Philadelphia)^{[d]}	Seattle SuperSonics (NBA)
2	31	Joe Bergman^{#}	F	United States	Cincinnati Royals (from Los Angeles)^{[e]}	Creighton (Sr.)
2	32	Howard Porter	F/C	United States	Chicago Bulls (from Phoenix)^{[f]}	Villanova (Sr.)
2	33	Marvin Stewart^{#}	G	United States	Philadelphia 76ers (from Chicago)^{[g]}	Nebraska (Sr.)
2	34	Gregg Northington^{#}	C	United States	New York Knicks	Alabama State (Jr.)
2	35	Willie Long^{#}	F/C	United States	Cleveland Cavaliers (from Milwaukee)^{[h]}	New Mexico (Sr.)
3	36	Gerald Lockett^{#}	F	United States	Cleveland Cavaliers	Arkansas AM&N (Sr.)
3	37	Larry Steele	G/F	United States	Portland Trail Blazers	Kentucky (Sr.)
3	38	Rich Yunkus^{#}	F	United States	Cincinnati Royals	Georgia Tech (Sr.)
3	39	Jeff Halliburton	G	United States	Atlanta Hawks	Drake (Sr.)
3	40	Clifford Ray	C	United States	Chicago Bulls (from Seattle)^{[i]}	Oklahoma (Sr.)
3	41	Jackie Ridgle	G	United States	Cleveland Cavaliers (from San Diego)^{[j]}	California (Sr.)
3	42	William Smith	C	United States	Portland Trail Blazers (from San Francisco)^{[b]}	Syracuse (Sr.)
3	43	Rich Rinaldi	G	United States	Baltimore Bullets	Saint Peter's (Sr.)
3	44	Dave Robisch	F/C	United States	Boston Celtics	Kansas (Sr.)
3	45	Marv Roberts	F/C	United States	Detroit Pistons	Utah State (Sr.)
3	46	Dave Wohl	G	United States	Philadelphia 76ers	Pennsylvania (Sr.)
3	47	Mike Gale	G	United States	Chicago Bulls (from Los Angeles)^{[k]}	Elizabeth City State (Sr.)
3	48	Mo Layton	G	United States	Phoenix Suns	USC (Sr.)
3	49	Dick Gibbs	G/F	United States	Chicago Bulls	Texas-El Paso (Sr.)
3	50	Kenny Mayfield	G	United States	New York Knicks	Tuskegee (Sr.)
3	51	Gary Brell^{#}	F	United States	Milwaukee Bucks	Marquette (Sr.)
4	52	Cliff Harris^{#}	F	United States	Cleveland Cavaliers	Hardin–Simmons (Sr.)
4	53	Jimmy O'Brien^{#}	G	United States	Buffalo Braves	Boston College (Sr.)
4	54	Bobby Fields^{#}	G	United States	Portland Trail Blazers	La Salle (Sr.)
4	55	Sid Catlett	F	United States	Cincinnati Royals	Notre Dame (Sr.)
4	56	Jim Welch^{#}	G	United States	Atlanta Hawks	Houston (Sr.)
4	57	Pembrook Burrows^{#}	C	United States	Seattle SuperSonics	Jacksonville (Sr.)
4	58	Tom Owens	F/C	United States	San Diego Rockets	South Carolina (Sr.)
4	59	Greg Gary^{#}	G	United States	Golden State Warriors	St. Bonaventure (Sr.)
4	60	Will Allen^{#}	F	United States	Baltimore Bullets	Miami (Florida) (Sr.)
4	61	Randy Denton	C	United States	Boston Celtics	Duke (Sr.)
4	62	Jarrett Durham^{#}	F	United States	Detroit Pistons	Duquesne (Sr.)
4	63	Erwin Johnson^{#}	F	United States	Philadelphia 76ers	Augusta (Sr.)
4	64	Roger Brown	C	United States	Los Angeles Lakers	Kansas (Sr.)
4	65	Walt Szczerbiak^{#}	F	United States	Phoenix Suns	George Washington (Sr.)
4	66	Jim Irving^{#}	G	United States	Chicago Bulls	Saint Louis (Sr.)
4	67	Steve Niles^{#}	C	United States	New York Knicks	Texas A&M (Sr.)
4	68	Henry Smith^{#}	F	United States	Milwaukee Bucks	Missouri (Sr.)
5	69	Brian Mahoney^{#}	G	United States	Cleveland Cavaliers	Manhattan (Sr.)
5	70	Garry Nelson^{#}	C	United States	Buffalo Braves	Duquesne (Sr.)
5	71	Héctor Blondet^{#}	F	Puerto Rico	Portland Trail Blazers	Murray State (Sr.)
5	72	Jimmie Guymon^{#}	G	United States	Cincinnati Royals	Eastern New Mexico (Sr.)
5	73	Tyrone Marioneaux^{#}	C	United States	Cincinnati Royals	Loyola (Louisiana) (Sr.)
5	74	Jeff Smith^{#}	F	United States	Seattle SuperSonics	New Mexico State (Sr.)
5	75	Rudy Benjamin^{#}	G	United States	Houston Rockets	Michigan State (Sr.)
5	76	Odis Allison	F	United States	San Francisco Warriors	Nevada-Las Vegas (Sr.)
5	77	Don Johnson^{#}	F	United States	Baltimore Bullets	Tennessee (Sr.)
5	78	Greg Nelson^{#}	F	United States	Houston Rockets	Jacksonville (Sr.)
5	79	Vincent White^{#}	F	United States	Detroit Pistons	Savannah State (Sr.)
5	80	Richard Hood^{#}	F	United States	Philadelphia 76ers	Phillips (Sr.)
5	81	Lee Dedmon^{#}	F	United States	Los Angeles Lakers	North Carolina (Sr.)
5	82	Ken Gardner^{#}	F	United States	Phoenix Suns	Utah (Sr.)
5	83	Larry Weatherford^{#}	G	United States	Chicago Bulls	Purdue (Sr.)
5	84	Bob Kissane^{#}	F	United States	Phoenix Suns	Holy Cross (Sr.)
5	85	Barry Nelson	C	United States	Milwaukee Bucks	Duquesne (Sr.)
6	86	Mike Childress^{#}	C	United States	Cleveland Cavaliers	Colorado State (Sr.)
6	87	Glen Summors^{#}	F	United States	Buffalo Braves	Gannon (Jr.)
6	88	Jim Day^{#}	F	United States	Portland Trail Blazers	Morehead State (Sr.)
6	89	Gil McGregor	F	United States	Cincinnati Royals	Wake Forest (Sr.)
6	90	Willie Humes^{#}	G	United States	Atlanta Hawks	Idaho State (Sr.)
6	91	Mike Necaise^{#}	F	United States	Seattle SuperSonics	William Carey (Sr.)
6	92	Gary Reist^{#}	G	United States	Houston Rockets	Rice (Sr.)
6	93	Charles Johnson	G	United States	San Francisco Warriors	California (Sr.)
6	94	John Novey^{#}	G	United States	Baltimore Bullets	Mount Saint Mary's (Sr.)
6	95	Thorpe Weber^{#}	F	United States	Boston Celtics	Vanderbilt (Sr.)
6	96	Jim Larrañaga^{#}	G	United States	Detroit Pistons	Providence (Sr.)
6	97	Jake Jones	G	United States	Philadelphia 76ers	Assumption (Sr.)
6	98	Bill Brickhouse^{#}	G	United States	Los Angeles Lakers	Montana State (Sr.)
6	99	William Graham^{#}	F	United States	Phoenix Suns	Kentucky State (Sr.)
6	100	Jim England^{#}	G	United States	Chicago Bulls	Tennessee (Sr.)
6	101	Bill Mainor^{#}	G	United States	New York Knicks	Fordham (Sr.)
6	102	Ed Kemp^{#}	F	United States	Milwaukee Bucks	Adams State (Sr.)
7	103	Tom Bush^{#}	C	United States	Cleveland Cavaliers	Drake (Sr.)
7	104	Randy Smith*	G/F	United States	Buffalo Braves	Buffalo State (Sr.)
7	105	Gene Knolle^{#}	G	United States	Portland Trail Blazers	Texas Tech (Sr.)
7	106	Ollie Shannon^{#}	G	United States	Cincinnati Royals	Minnesota (Sr.)
7	107	Mike Jordan^{#}	F	United States	Atlanta Hawks	Savannah State (Sr.)
7	108	John Duncan^{#}	F	United States	Seattle SuperSonics	Kentucky Wesleyan (Sr.)
7	109	Eric Hill^{#}	G	United States	Houston Rockets	Minnesota (Sr.)
7	110	Ken May^{#}	F	United States	Golden State Warriors	Dayton (Sr.)
7	111	Dennis Hogg^{#}	F	United States	Baltimore Bullets	Washington State (Sr.)
7	112	Skip Young^{#}	G	United States	Boston Celtics	Florida State (Sr.)
7	113	Steve Kelly^{#}	G	United States	Detroit Pistons	BYU (Sr.)
7	114	Curtis Ford^{#}	F	United States	Philadelphia 76ers	Northeastern State (Sr.)
7	115	Gene Gathers^{#}	F	United States	Los Angeles Lakers	Bradley (Sr.)
7	116	Ralph Brateris^{#}	F	United States	Phoenix Suns	Trenton State (Sr.)
7	117	Artis Gilmore^	C	United States	Chicago Bulls	Jacksonville (Sr.)
7	118	Danny Davis^{#}	F	United States	New York Knicks	Henderson State (Sr.)
7	119	Gene Phillips^{#}	G	United States	Milwaukee Bucks	SMU (Sr.)
8	120	Charlie Davis	G	United States	Cleveland Cavaliers	Wake Forest (Sr.)
8	121	Craig Love^{#}	F	United States	Buffalo Braves	Ohio (Sr.)
8	122	John Sutter^{#}	F	United States	Portland Trail Blazers	Tulane (Sr.)
8	123	Frank Fitzgerald^{#}	F	United States	Cincinnati Royals	Boston College (Sr.)
8	124	Jim Smith^{#}	F	United States	Atlanta Hawks	Kentucky Wesleyan (Sr.)
8	125	Charlie Lowery	G	United States	Seattle SuperSonics	Puget Sound (Sr.)
8	126	Rick Katherman^{#}	F	United States	Houston Rockets	Duke (Sr.)
8	127	Jim Haderlein^{#}	F	United States	Golden State Warriors	Loyola Marymount (Sr.)
8	128	Russell Golden^{#}	F	United States	Baltimore Bullets	Jackson State (Jr.)
8	129	John Ribock^{#}	F	United States	Boston Celtics	South Carolina (Sr.)
8	130	Wayne Jones^{#}	G	United States	Detroit Pistons	Niagara (Sr.)
8	131	Barry Yates	F	United States	Philadelphia 76ers	Maryland (Jr.)
8	132	Luke Adams^{#}	F	United States	Los Angeles Lakers	Lamar (Sr.)
8	133	Vernell Ellzy^{#}	F	United States	Phoenix Suns	Florida State (Sr.)
8	134	Clarence Sherrod^{#}	G	United States	Chicago Bulls	Wisconsin (Sr.)
8	135	Leroy Eldridge^{#}	F	United States	New York Knicks	Cheyney (Sr.)
8	136	Felix Thruston^{#}	F	United States	Milwaukee Bucks	Trinity (Sr.)
9	137	Rich Walker^{#}	G	United States	Cleveland Cavaliers	Bowling Green (Sr.)
9	138	Gary Stewart^{#}	F	United States	Buffalo Braves	Canisius (Jr.)
9	139	Goo Kennedy	F/C	United States	Portland Trail Blazers	Texas Christian (Sr.)
9	140	Ernie Fleming^{#}	F	United States	Atlanta Hawks	Jacksonville (Jr.)
9	141	Larry Holliday^{#}	G	United States	Seattle SuperSonics	Oregon (Sr.)
9	142	Willie Cherry^{#}	F	United States	Houston Rockets	Denver (Sr.)
9	143	Clarence Smith^{#}	F	United States	Golden State Warriors	Villanova (Sr.)
9	144	Ron Johnson^{#}	C	United States	Baltimore Bullets	Murray State (Sr.)
9	145	Ray Greene^{#}	G	United States	Boston Celtics	California State (Pennsylvania) (Sr.)
9	146	Paul Botts^{#}	G	United States	Detroit Pistons	Central Michigan (Sr.)
9	147	Tom Lee^{#}	F	United States	Philadelphia 76ers	Arizona (Sr.)
9	148	Bob Cheeks^{#}	F	United States	Los Angeles Lakers	Whittier (Sr.)
9	149	Mike Johnson^{#}	F	United States	Phoenix Suns	Pittsburg State (Sr.)
9	150	Jackie Dinkins	F	United States	Chicago Bulls	Voorhees (Sr.)
9	151	Mike O'Brien^{#}	F	United States	New York Knicks	Saint Leo (Sr.)
9	152	Rick Howat^{#}	G	United States	Milwaukee Bucks	Illinois (Sr.)
10	153	Jim Meredith^{#}	F	United States	Cleveland Cavaliers	Washington State (Sr.)
10	154	Don Ward^{#}	G	United States	Buffalo Braves	Colgate (Sr.)
10	155	Greg Starrick^{#}	G	United States	Portland Trail Blazers	Southern Illinois (Jr.)
10	156	Ron Rippetoe^{#}	G	United States	Atlanta Hawks	Lipscomb (Sr.)
10	157	Ed Huston^{#}	G	United States	Seattle SuperSonics	Puget Sound (Sr.)
10	158	Calvin Oliver^{#}	F	United States	Houston Rockets	Pan American (Sr.)
10	159	Bill Drozdiak^{#}	F	United States	Golden State Warriors	Oregon (Sr.)
10	160	Eddie Myers^{#}	C	United States	Baltimore Bullets	Arizona (Sr.)
10	161	Dale Dover^{#}	G	United States	Boston Celtics	Harvard (Sr.)
10	162	Steve Butcher^{#}	G	United States	Detroit Pistons	Pikeville (Sr.)
10	163	Jim Dinwiddie^{#}	G	United States	Philadelphia 76ers	Kentucky (Sr.)
10	164	Cliff Mosley^{#}	F	United States	Los Angeles Lakers	Quinnipiac (Sr.)
10	165	Tom Newell^{#}	G	United States	Phoenix Suns	Hawaii (Sr.)
10	166	David Withers^{#}	F	United States	Chicago Bulls	Delaware State (Sr.)
10	167	Andy Toth^{#}	G	United States	New York Knicks	Cheyney (Sr.)
10	168	Dan Fife^{#}	G	United States	Milwaukee Bucks	Michigan (Sr.)
11	169	Mike Casey^{#}	G	United States	Cleveland Cavaliers	Kentucky (Sr.)
11	170	Bill Warner^{#}	G	United States	Buffalo Braves	Arizona (Sr.)
11	171	Howard Burford^{#}	F	United States	Portland Trail Blazers	Gonzaga (Sr.)
11	172	Levi Wyatt^{#}	F	United States	Atlanta Hawks	Alcorn State (Sr.)
11	173	Jerome Perry^{#}	G	United States	Seattle SuperSonics	Western Kentucky (Sr.)
11	174	Doug Rex^{#}	F	United States	Houston Rockets	UC Santa Barbara (Sr.)
11	175	Chuck Olkowski^{#}	F	United States	Baltimore Bullets	Baltimore (Sr.)
11	176	Reggie Brooks^{#}	F	United States	Boston Celtics	New Hampshire College (Sr.)
11	177	Larry Saunders^{#}	F	United States	Detroit Pistons	Duke (Sr.)
11	178	Dana Pagett^{#}	G	United States	Philadelphia 76ers	USC (Sr.)
11	179	Paul Litz^{#}	F	United States	Phoenix Suns	Western Carolina (Sr.)
11	180	Al Smith^{#}	G	United States	Chicago Bulls	Bradley (Sr.)
11	181	Kenneth Davis^{#}	G	United States	New York Knicks	Georgetown (Kentucky) (Sr.)
11	182	Blaine Henry^{#}	G	United States	Milwaukee Bucks	Marshall (Sr.)
12	183	Doug Hess^{#}	C	United States	Cleveland Cavaliers	Toledo (Sr.)
12	184	Butch Webster^{#}	F	United States	Buffalo Braves	New Orleans (Sr.)
12	185	Don Sechler^{#}	C	United States	Portland Trail Blazers	Delaware Valley (Sr.)
12	186	Roger Moore^{#}	F	United States	Atlanta Hawks	Columbus (Sr.)
12	187	Chris Schrobilgen^{#}	F	United States	Houston Rockets	USC (Sr.)
12	188	Bob Connor^{#}	G	United States	Baltimore Bullets	Loyola (Maryland) (Sr.)
12	189	John Dalton^{#}	G	United States	Boston Celtics	Suffolk (Sr.)
12	190	Bob Horn^{#}	F	United States	Detroit Pistons	Tulsa (Sr.)
12	191	Ken Kowall^{#}	G	United States	Philadelphia 76ers	Ohio (Sr.)
12	192	Floyd Mason^{#}	F	United States	Phoenix Suns	Alcorn State (Sr.)
12	193	Ken Riley^{#}	F	United States	Chicago Bulls	Middle Tennessee (Sr.)
12	194	Carl Greenfield^{#}	F	United States	New York Knicks	Eastern Kentucky (Sr.)
12	195	Gene Mumford^{#}	G	United States	Milwaukee Bucks	Scranton (Sr.)
13	196	Bobby Jones^{#}	G	United States	Cleveland Cavaliers	Drake (Sr.)
13	197	Pete Smith^{#}	F	United States	Buffalo Braves	Hartford Capitols (EBA)
13	198	Ed Jenkins^{#}	F	United States	Atlanta Hawks	Shaw College (Sr.)
13	199	Lee McCullough^{#}	F	United States	Houston Rockets	Indiana (Pennsylvania) (Sr.)
13	200	Tom Crosswhite^{#}	F	United States	Baltimore Bullets	Dayton (Sr.)
13	201	Leroy Chalk^{#}	F	United States	Boston Celtics	Nebraska (Sr.)
13	202	Willie Roberson^{#}	G	United States	Detroit Pistons	Wyoming (Sr.)
13	203	Hank Commodore^{#}	G	United States	Philadelphia 76ers	Northwestern State (Sr.)
13	204	Ron Dorsey^{#}	F	United States	Phoenix Suns	Tennessee State (Sr.)
13	205	Ed Goode^{#}	G	United States	Chicago Bulls	DePaul (Sr.)
13	206	Larry Ducksworth^{#}	F	United States	New York Knicks	Henderson State (Sr.)
13	207	Pierre Russell^{#}	G	United States	Milwaukee Bucks	Kansas (Sr.)
14	208	Bubbles Harris^{#}	G	United States	Cleveland Cavaliers	Indiana (Sr.)
14	209	Ray Lavender^{#}	C	United States	Buffalo Braves	Drury (Sr.)
14	210	Gene Roberson^{#}	G	United States	Houston Rockets	Canisius (Sr.)
14	211	Rudolph Peele^{#}	G	United States	Baltimore Bullets	Norfolk State (Sr.)
14	212	Art Davis^{#}	F	United States	Detroit Pistons	Johnson C. Smith (Sr.)
14	213	Kenny Booker^{#}	G	United States	Phoenix Suns	UCLA (Sr.)
14	214	Richard Dixon^{#}	G	United States	Chicago Bulls	Loyola Marymount (Sr.)
14	215	Jack O'Connor^{#}	F	United States	New York Knicks	Great Falls (Sr.)
14	216	George Jackson^{#}	C	United States	Milwaukee Bucks	Dayton (Sr.)
15	217	Larry Baker^{#}	G	United States	Cleveland Cavaliers	Wittenberg (Sr.)
15	218	William Chatmon^{#}	F	United States	Buffalo Braves	Baylor (Sr.)
15	219	Bill Quigg^{#}	F	United States	Houston Rockets	Gonzaga (Sr.)
15	220	Morrell James^{#}	G	United States	Baltimore Bullets	Norfolk State (Sr.)
15	221	James Fleming^{#}	F	United States	Detroit Pistons	Alcorn State (Sr.)
15	222	Curtis Carter^{#}	F	United States	Phoenix Suns	Bishop (Sr.)
15	223	Lisco Thomas^{#}	F	United States	Chicago Bulls	Furman (Sr.)
15	224	Loyd King^{#}	G	United States	Milwaukee Bucks	Virginia Tech (Sr.)
16	225	Tyree Vance^{#}	F	United States	Cleveland Cavaliers	Wisconsin–Oshkosh (Sr.)
16	226	James Douglas^{#}	G	United States	Buffalo Braves	Memphis (Sr.)
16	227	Leonard Jackson^{#}	F	United States	Houston Rockets	Oregon (Sr.)
16	228	Fred Smiley^{#}	G	United States	Detroit Pistons	Detroit College of Business (So.)
16	229	Bob Bissant^{#}	G	United States	Chicago Bulls	Loyola (Louisiana) (Sr.)
17	230	Nelson Isley^{#}	G	United States	Buffalo Braves	LSU (Sr.)
17	231	Steve Sims^{#}	G	United States	Houston Rockets	Pepperdine (Sr.)
17	232	Leroy Jenkins^{#}	G	United States	Detroit Pistons	Davenport (Sr.)
18	233	Joey Meyer^{#}	G	United States	Buffalo Braves	DePaul (Sr.)
18	234	Carlos Quintanar^{#}	F	Mexico	Houston Rockets	–
18	235	Ike Bundy^{#}	G	United States	Detroit Pistons	Detroit Tech (Sr.)
19	236	Gary Schneider^{#}	F	United States	Houston Rockets	San Diego State (Sr.)
19	237	Ed Jenkins^{#}	F	United States	Detroit Pistons	Shaw College (Sr.)

== Trades ==
- ^{a} On October 20, 1970, the Chicago Bulls acquired a second-round pick from the Portland Trail Blazers in exchange for Shaler Halimon. The Bulls used the pick to draft Willie Sojourner.
- ^{b 1} ^{2} On March 23, 1971, the Portland Trail Blazers acquired 1971 and 1972 second-round picks and a 1971 third-round pick from the San Francisco Warriors in exchange for Jim Barnett. The Blazers used the picks to draft Charlie Yelverton and William Smith.
- ^{c} On October 22, 1970, the Portland Trail Blazers acquired a second-round pick from the Baltimore Bullets in exchange for Dorie Murrey. The Blazers used the pick to draft Rick Fisher.
- ^{d} On May 11, 1970, the Buffalo Braves acquired Bob Kauffman and a second-round pick from the Philadelphia 76ers in exchange for Bailey Howell. The Braves used the pick to draft Spencer Haywood.
- ^{e} On the draft-day, the Cincinnati Royals acquired a second-round pick from the Los Angeles Lakers in exchange for Flynn Robinson. The Royals used the pick to draft Joe Bergman.
- ^{f} On April 23, 1970, the Chicago Bulls acquired Jim Fox and a second-round pick from the Phoenix Suns in exchange for Clem Haskins. The Bulls used the pick to draft Howard Porte.
- ^{g} On October 16, 1970, the Philadelphia 76ers acquired a second-round pick from the Chicago Bulls in exchange for Matt Guokas. The 76ers used the pick to draft Marvin Stewart.
- ^{h} On February 1, 1971, the Cleveland Cavaliers acquired Gary Freeman and a second-round pick from the Milwaukee Bucks in exchange for McCoy McLemore. The Cavaliers used the pick to draft Willie Long.
- ^{i} On September 5, 1969, the Chicago Bulls acquired Bob Kauffman and a third-round pick from the Seattle SuperSonics in exchange for Bob Boozer and Barry Clemens. The Bulls used the pick to draft Clifford Ray.
- ^{j} On December 9, 1970, the Cleveland Cavaliers acquired a third-round pick from the San Diego Rockets in exchange for Johnny Egan. The Cavaliers used the pick to draft Jackie Ridgle.
- ^{k} On September 9, 1969, the Chicago Bulls acquired a third-round pick from the Los Angeles Lakers in exchange for Mike Lynn. The Bulls used the pick to draft Mike Gale.

== Notable undrafted players ==
These players were not selected in the 1971 draft but played at least one game in the NBA.

Player	Pos.	Nationality	School/club team
Vester Marshall	F	United States	Oklahoma (Jr.)

== Hardship draft ==
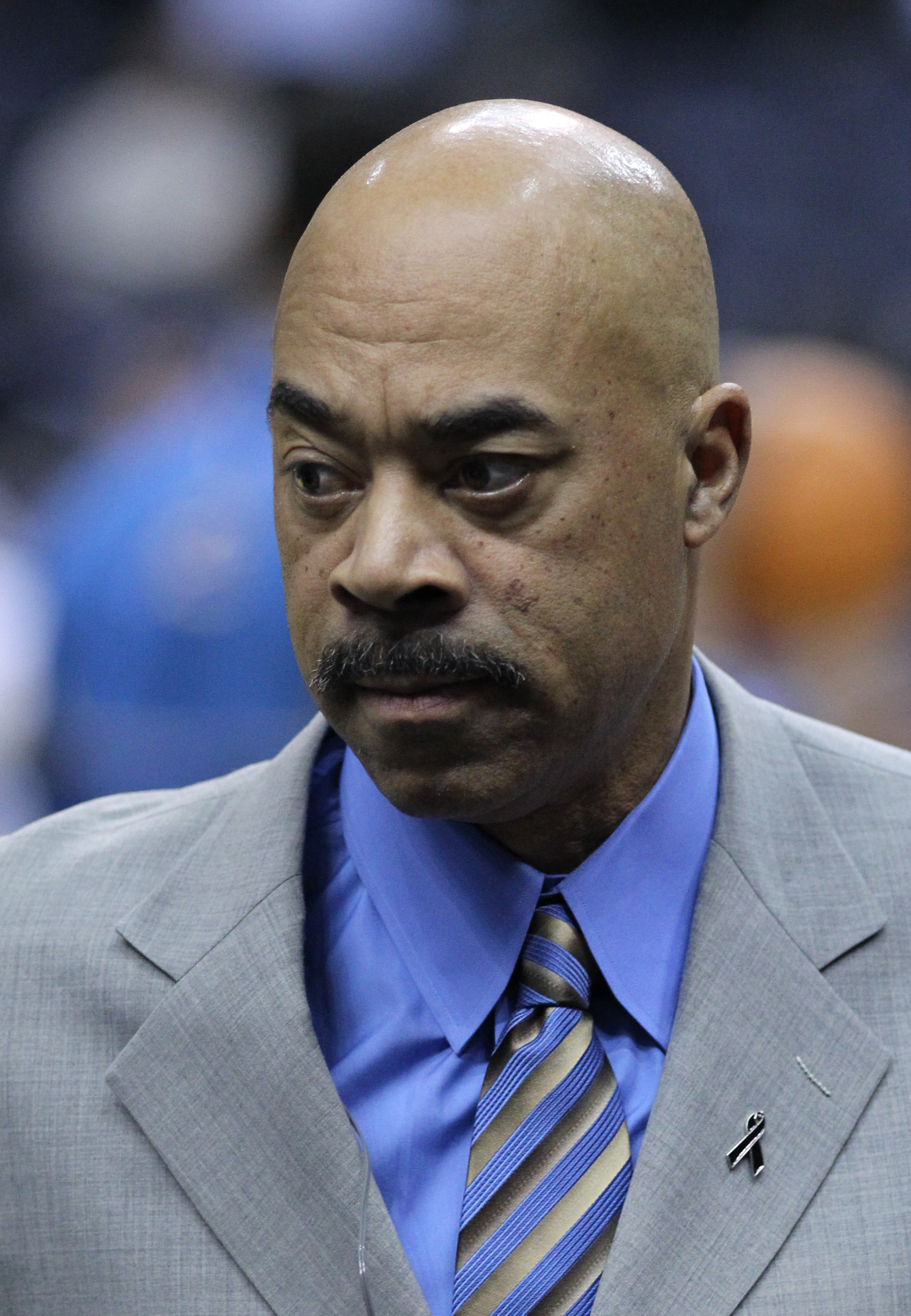
Phil Chenier was selected by the Baltimore Bullets with the fourth pick of the hardship draft.

On September 10, 1971, the NBA hosted a supplemental hardship draft for college underclassmen who wish to join the league. Prior to the 1971 Draft, college underclassmen were not eligible to be drafted until their college class graduated. These underclassmen fulfilled the "hardship" criteria and were allowed to enter the draft early. This new rule came as a result of Spencer Haywood winning the court case against the NBA which allowed him to play in the NBA before his college class graduated. The teams selected in reverse order of their win–loss record in the previous season. The team that made a selection must withdraw their equivalent selection in the 1972 draft. The teams were allowed to not exercise their rights on this hardship draft and thus retained their full selection in the 1972 draft. Seventeen different players had initially entered the hardship draft, but only six players would ultimately commit to entering the NBA's hardship draft that year. The first hardship draft saw North Carolina's Bill Chamberlain, Marquette's Jim Chones, St. John's Mel Davis, Duquesne's Mickey Davis, Villanova's Chris Ford, the second potential high school prospect in Raymond Lewis from Verbum Dei High School, future Hall of Famer Bob McAdoo from Vincennes Community College, another second potential high school prospect in Campy Russell from Pontiac Central High School, Princeton's Brian Taylor, future Hall of Famer Bill Walton from UCLA, and Michigan's Henry Wilmore all initially enter this year's draft by the hardship draft, but later declined their entry for at least another year. (It would later be revealed that Mickey Davis would be selected in the rivaling ABA's own "Special Circumstances Draft" that was held the same day as the NBA's own Hardship Draft as the #1 pick there (albeit selected in the second round) by the Denver Rockets, with Davis playing in the ABA during that following season.)

Three teams that were supposed to have the first three selections, the Cleveland Cavaliers, Buffalo Braves and Portland Trail Blazers, declined to exercise their rights. Therefore, the Cincinnati Royals had the first selection, which they used to select Nate Williams from Utah State University. Phil Chenier, a junior guard from the University of California, was selected by the Baltimore Bullets. He is the only player from the hardship draft who was selected to All-NBA Team and All-Star Game. Joe Hammond, who had not played high school and college basketball, was selected in the fourth round by the Los Angeles Lakers. Hammond, who had played for the Allentown Jets in the Eastern Basketball Association (EBA) prior to the draft, had to apply as the "hardship case" because his college class could not graduate until 1972 if he had gone to the college. From the six players that were available for selection, only Ed Owens from Weber State University was not selected by any NBA team. The rivaling ABA would also host their own hardship draft later that year called the "Special Circumstances Draft" in response to the NBA's hardship draft, though the ABA would only see three total selections from that specific event, including a repeat selection of Phil Chenier by the Carolina Cougars there. Chenier would also be drafted by the ABA two other times in 1973 by the Virginia Squires in their senior draft that year and by the New York Nets in 1974 from that league's unique draft involving the NBA's own players at that time despite him playing for the Bullets by then.

Round	Pick	Player	Pos.	Nationality	Team	School/club team
1	1	Nate Williams	G/F	United States	Cincinnati Royals	Utah State (Jr.)
1	2	Tom Payne	C	United States	Atlanta Hawks	Kentucky (So.)
1	3	Cyril Baptiste^{#}	F/C	United States	Golden State Warriors	Creighton (Jr.)
1	4	Phil Chenier*	G	United States	Baltimore Bullets	California (Jr.)
4	5	Joe Hammond^{#}	G	United States	Los Angeles Lakers	Allentown Jets (EBA)

== See also ==
- List of first overall NBA draft picks
