= Ken Mayfield =

American basketball player (1948–2025)

Personal information
- Born: May 11, 1948 Chicago, Illinois, U.S.
- Died: November 3, 2025 (aged 77) Decatur, Georgia, U.S.
- Listed height: 6 ft 2 in (1.88 m)
- Listed weight: 185 lb (84 kg)

Career information
- High school: Dunbar (Chicago, IL)
- College: Coffeyville CC (1967–1968); Tuskegee (1968–1971)
- NBA draft: 1971: 3rd round, 50th overall pick
- Drafted by: New York Knicks
- Playing career: 1971–1978
- Position: Shooting guard
- Number: 16

Career history
- 1971–1972: Allentown Jets
- 1973–1974: Scranton Apollos
- 1975: Belgium Lions
- 1975: New York Knicks
- 1976–1977: Hartford Downtowners
- 1977–1978: Allentown Jets

Career highlights
- All-EBA First Team (1974); All-EBA Second Team (1973)
- Stats at NBA.com
- Stats at Basketball Reference

Kendall Mark Mayfield (May 11, 1948 – November 3, 2025) was an American former professional basketball player who played for the New York Knicks of the National Basketball Association (NBA).

== Career ==
Mayfield was drafted in the 3rd round (50th overall) of the 1971 NBA draft by the New York Knicks. He signed with the team in June but was cut in October before the season. He rejoined the Knicks during the 1972 offseason but was again cut before the season. He was again cut from the Knicks' preseason roster in October 1974.

In between his short stints with the Knicks, he mostly played in the Eastern Basketball Association (EBA) for teams like the Allentown Jets. He was selected to the All-EBA First Team in 1974 and Second Team in 1973. He also had a stint in the European Professional Basketball League for the Belgium Lions in early 1975.

Mayfield finally played for the Knicks during the 1974–75 NBA season. He appeared in 13 games for 2.8 points per game before being released in November 1975. He died on November 3, 2025, aged 77.

== Career statistics ==
Legend
GP	Games played	GS	Games started	MPG	Minutes per game
FG%	Field goal percentage	3P%	3-point field goal percentage	FT%	Free throw percentage
RPG	Rebounds per game	APG	Assists per game	SPG	Steals per game
BPG	Blocks per game	PPG	Points per game	**Bold**	Career high

=== NBA ===
==== Regular season ====
Year	Team	GP	GS	MPG	FG%	FT%	RPG	APG	SPG	BPG	PPG
1975–76	New York	13	0	4.9	.370	1.000	.6	.3	.0	.0	2.8
