= Amos Thomas (basketball) =

American basketball player

Personal information
- Born: February 14, 1949 Philadelphia, Pennsylvania, U.S.
- Died: November 4, 2005 (aged 57)
- Listed height: 6 ft 7 in (2.01 m)
- Listed weight: 190 lb (86 kg)

Career information
- High school: Douglass (Oklahoma City, Oklahoma)
- College: Oklahoma State (1968–1969); Southwestern Oklahoma State (1969–1971)
- NBA draft: 1971: 2nd round, 26th overall pick
- Drafted by: Buffalo Braves
- Position: Shooting guard / small forward
- Number: 11
- Stats at Basketball Reference

Amos Thomas (November 14, 1949 – November 4, 2005) was an American collegiate and professional basketball player. He was a second round pick of the Buffalo Braves of the National Basketball Association in the 1971 NBA draft.

== College career ==
The 1967 Oklahoma High School Player of the Year at Frederick A. Douglass High School, Thomas played college basketball for legendary Coach Henry Iba at Oklahoma State University, from 1967 to 1969. Playing on the freshman team, Thomas Averaged 30.9 points and 12.5 rebounds in 1967–1968. Playing Varsity the next season, he averaged 19.9 points and 7.0 rebounds in 1968–69.

Thomas was declared ineligible by the NCAA midway through the 1968–1969 season. The press release of January 24, 1969 read as follows: "With a chance to climb back into the Big Eight basketball race, but the biggest news of the week in the conference came Thursday in a bombshell dropped at Stillwater. Okla. Oklahoma State University announced that sophomore star Amos Thomas is being declared ineligible for the remainder of the season, depriving Coach Henry Iba and the Cowboys of the Big Eight's No. 5 scorer. The 6-foot-7 Thomas from Oklahoma City, the school said, is being dropped because he played last spring in a benefit game in Oklahoma City in violation of Big Eight and National Collegiate Athletic Association rules. OSU said it had asked the Big Eight to investigate Thomas' participation in the game, a benefit for Dunjee High School's athletic program, and that the conference had prepared a report. "Based on this information ... it has been determined that the participation in this game is a violation of NCAA and conference rules," the OSU disclosure said. "Consequently, the university is declaring Thomas ineligible for the remainder of the basketball season." Thomas' future eligibility, the school said, would be appealed to the Big Eight and NCAA. Iba, whose Cowboys are off to a lackluster 1–2 start in the conference race, could not be" reached Thursday night for comment. There is little doubt, however, that the loss of Thomas will seriously cripple any hopes OSU retained of contending for the Big Eight title. He was averaging 17.7 points and 7.7 rebounds a game in conference play. Thomas was picked to the first all-tournament team in the Big Eight pre-season tournament last month in Kansas City. OSU, which plays at Nebraska Monday night, has an 8–6 season record. Big Eight Commissioner Wayne Duke said Thursday night it will be determined at the regular conference meeting Feb. 28 – March 1 in Kansas City whether the Cowboys will be forced to forfeit any of their victories. Duke said he had been asked to investigate the matter and had done so, conferring both with Thomas and Iba in the process. NCAA and Big Eight rules explicitly state that athletes shall not participate in any outside competition of any form."

Thomas then attended an NAIA school, Southwestern Oklahoma State University from 1969 to 1971, where he averaged 28.0 points in 1969–1970 and 24.3 in 1970–1971.

On December 3, 1968, Thomas set the Oklahoma State record for points in a debut game, with 27. The record was broken by James Anderson in 2007, with 29.

== Professional career ==
Thomas was drafted 26th overall by the Buffalo Braves in the 1971 NBA draft, but never appeared in an NBA season. Thomas was also drafted by the Memphis Tams of the American Basketball Association in the 4th Round of the 1971 ABA Draft.

== Death ==
On November 4, 2005, Thomas died of a stroke.
