= Cherry Hill Rookies =

The Cherry Hill Rookies were an American basketball team based in Cherry Hill, New Jersey that was a member of the Eastern Basketball Association. The team changed its name to the Cherry Hill Pros for the 1974/75 season.

In 1974, legendary tough guy John Brisker played three games for Cherry Hill, after being demoted by the Seattle SuperSonics. Brisker scored 51 points in his first EBA game, 58 in his second and 29 in his third before returning to Seattle.

== Year-by-year ==
Year	League	Gp	W	L	Pct	Reg. season	Playoffs
1973/74	EBA	27	5	22	.185	4th, Eastern	Did not qualify
1974/75	EBA	26	9	17	.346	4th	Did not qualify
Totals	Franchise	53	14	39	.264		
