= Ron Dorsey (basketball, born 1948) =

American basketball player (born 1948)

Personal information
- Born: October 10, 1948 (age 78)
- Listed height: 6 ft 4 in (1.93 m)
- Listed weight: 200 lb (91 kg)

Career information
- High school: Crispus Attucks (Indianapolis, Indiana)
- College: Tennessee State (1968–1971)
- NBA draft: 1971: 13th round, 204th overall pick
- Drafted by: Phoenix Suns
- Position: Small forward
- Number: 4

Career history
- 1971: Carolina Cougars
- Stats at Basketball Reference

Ronald Dorsey (born October 10, 1948) is an American former basketball player. He played college basketball for Tennessee StateTennessee State before playing briefly in the American Basketball Association (ABA) with the Carolina Cougars during the 1971–72 season.

He attended Crispus Attucks High School in Indianapolis, Indiana, where he played basketball and football, before joining Tennessee State University in 1967. In 1971, he was named to All-Nashville First Team.

Dorsey was drafted by the Phoenix Suns in the 13^{th} round of the 1971 NBA draft, but never signed with them. He later signed with the Carolina Cougars of the ABA where he appeared in one game on October 19, scoring four points with five rebounds in 12 minutes. A few days later he was sent to the Scranton Apollos of the Eastern League but he did not appear in any games for the team.
