= 1971–72 Seattle SuperSonics season =

NBA professional basketball team season

- Head coach: Lenny Wilkens
- General manager: Bob Houbregs
- Owners: Sam Schulman
- Arena: Seattle Center Coliseum

Results
- Record: 47–35 (.573)
- Place: Division: 3rd (Pacific); Conference: 6th (Western)
- Playoff finish: Did not qualify
- Stats at Basketball Reference

Local media
- Television: KTNT-TV
- Radio: KOMO

The 1971–72 Seattle SuperSonics season was the 5th season of the Seattle SuperSonics in the National Basketball Association (NBA). In their third season with Lenny Wilkens as head coach, the Sonics finished the regular season in sixth place in the Western Conference with a 47–35 record, their first winning record in franchise history. Wilkens quit as head coach at the end of the season and was replaced by former Dallas Chaparrals coach Tom Nissalke.

== Offseason ==
With the sixth overall pick in the 1971 NBA draft, Seattle selected Fred Brown from the University of Iowa. After months of negotiation (the Kentucky Colonels of the American Basketball Association also selected him in the 1971 ABA draft), the Sonics signed him to a multi-year contract. Brown would go on to have a career spanning 13 seasons with the SuperSonics.

The Buffalo Braves selected Spencer Haywood with the 30th overall pick and intended to claim rights to the player from the SuperSonics. Matters were taken to court, with the judge ruling in favor of the Seattle franchise. Tensions prior to the trial rose to the point that Buffalo decided to pay expansion fees to every team in the league with the exception of the Sonics.

=== Draft ===
The Seattle SuperSonics signed their second round pick Jim McDaniels in February 1972. Since McDaniels was under contract with the Carolina Cougars of the American Basketball Association, both teams began a legal battle over the player's contract, with a judge in the King County Superior Court granting permission to McDaniels to play for the Sonics. The Cougars appealed to the Washington Supreme Court but McDaniels stayed in Seattle.

Round	Pick	Player	Position	Nationality	College
1	6	Fred Brown	G	United States	Iowa
2	23	Jim McDaniels	F/C	United States	Western Kentucky
4	57	Pembrook Burrows	C	United States	Jacksonville
5	74	Jeff Smith	F	United States	New Mexico State
6	91	Mike Necaise	F	United States	William Carey
7	108	John Duncan	F	United States	Kentucky Wesleyan
8	125	Charlie Lowery	G	United States	Puget Sound
9	141	Larry Holliday	G	United States	Oregon
10	157	Ed Huston	G	United States	Puget Sound
11	173	Jerome Perry	G	United States	Western Kentucky

== Roster ==
1971–72 Seattle SuperSonics roster
Players

Pos.	No.	Player	Height	Weight	DOB	From
G	32	Fred Brown	6 ft 3 in (1.91 m)	182 lb (83 kg)	1948–08–07	Iowa
F	43	Barry Clemens	6 ft 6 in (1.98 m)	210 lb (95 kg)	1943–05–01	Ohio Wesleyan
F/C	41	Pete Cross	6 ft 9 in (2.06 m)	230 lb (104 kg)	1948–03–28	San Francisco
G	33	Jake Ford	6 ft 3 in (1.91 m)	180 lb (82 kg)	1946–04–29	Maryland Eastern Shore
F/C	24	Spencer Haywood	6 ft 8 in (2.03 m)	225 lb (102 kg)	1949–04–22	Detroit Mercy
F	40	Gar Heard	6 ft 6 in (1.98 m)	219 lb (99 kg)	1948–05–03	Oklahoma
F	22	Don Kojis	6 ft 5 in (1.96 m)	215 lb (98 kg)	1939–01–15	Marquette
F/C	44	Jim McDaniels	6 ft 11 in (2.11 m)	228 lb (103 kg)	1948–04–02	Western Kentucky
F/C	35	Don Smith	6 ft 9 in (2.06 m)	235 lb (107 kg)	1946–04–07	Iowa State
G/F	10	Dick Snyder	6 ft 5 in (1.96 m)	207 lb (94 kg)	1944–02–01	West Virginia
G	19	Lenny Wilkens	6 ft 1 in (1.85 m)	180 lb (82 kg)	1937–10–28	Providence
G	11	Lee Winfield	6 ft 2 in (1.88 m)	174 lb (79 kg)	1947–02–04	North Texas

Coaches
Head coach
- Lenny Wilkens
Assistant(s)
- Rod Thorn

Legend
- (DP) Unsigned draft pick
- (FA) Free agent
- (S) Suspended
- Injured

Roster

== Standings ==
Pacific Division	W	L	PCT	GB	Home	Road	Neutral	Div
y-Los Angeles Lakers	69	13	.841	–	36–5	31–7	2–1	21–3
x-Golden State Warriors	51	31	.622	18	27–8	21–20	3–3	14–10
Seattle SuperSonics	47	35	.573	22	28–12	18–22	1–1	12–12
Houston Rockets	34	48	.415	35	15–20	14–23	5–5	9–15
Portland Trail Blazers	18	64	.220	51	14–26	4–35	0–3	4–20

#	Western Conference			
#	Team	W	L	PCT
1	z-Los Angeles Lakers	69	13	.841
2	y-Milwaukee Bucks	63	19	.768
3	x-Chicago Bulls	57	25	.695
4	x-Golden State Warriors	51	31	.622
5	Phoenix Suns	49	33	.598
6	Seattle SuperSonics	47	35	.573
7	Houston Rockets	34	48	.415
8	Detroit Pistons	26	56	.317
9	Portland Trail Blazers	18	64	.220

- z – clinched division title
- y – clinched division title
- x – clinched playoff spot

== Game log ==
1971–72 game log
Total: 47–35 (Home: 28–12; Road: 18–22; Neutral:1–1)
October: 7–2 (home: 4–1; road: 3–1)

Game	Date	Team	Score	High points	High rebounds	High assists	Location Attendance	Record
1	October 12	@ Buffalo	W 123–90	Spencer Haywood (29)			Seattle Center Coliseum; 10,723	1–0
2	October 15	@ Portland	W 119–88	Spencer Haywood, Lenny Wilkens (23)			Memorial Coliseum; 6,124	2–0
3	October 16	Milwaukee	L 91–98	Spencer Haywood (23)			Seattle Center Coliseum; 13,100	2–1
4	October 19	@ Cincinnati	W 101–100	Dick Snyder (24)			Cincinnati Gardens; 2,967	3–1
5	October 20	@ Philadelphia	L 93–100	Don Kojis (18)			The Spectrum; 10,365	3–2
6	October 22	Houston	W 110–91	Spencer Haywood (23)			Seattle Center Coliseum; 10,182	4–2
7	October 24	Cincinnati	W 119–101	Spencer Haywood (23)			Seattle Center Coliseum; 10,318	5–2
8	October 28	Buffalo	W 106–96	Barry Clemens (26)			Seattle Center Coliseum; 5,816	6–2
9	October 30	Los Angeles	W 115–106	Don Kojis (26)			Seattle Center Coliseum; 13,138	7–2

November : 8–7 (home: 5–3; road: 3–4)

Game	Date	Team	Score	High points	High rebounds	High assists	Location Attendance	Record
10	November 4	@ Golden State	L 96–98	Spencer Haywood (31)			Oakland–Alameda County Coliseum Arena; 5,814	7–3
11	November 5	New York	W 101–97	Lenny Wilkens (26)			Seattle Center Coliseum; 12,638	8–3
12	November 7	Golden State	L 102–109	Spencer Haywood (32)			Seattle Center Coliseum; 13,197	8–4
13	November 11	Cleveland	W 110–91	Spencer Haywood (20)			Seattle Center Coliseum; 5,808	9–4
14	November 12	@ Los Angeles	L 107–115	Spencer Haywood (26)			The Forum; 16,550	9–5
15	November 13	Boston	W 116–112	Lenny Wilkens (21)			Seattle Center Coliseum; 12,738	10–5
16	November 16	@ Chicago	L 87–95	Don Kojis (22)			Chicago Stadium; 8,907	10–6
17	November 17	@ Atlanta	W 112–104	Spencer Haywood (23)			Alexander Memorial Coliseum; 5,462	11–6
18	November 19	Milwaukee	L 107–108	Spencer Haywood (36)			Seattle Center Coliseum; 12,914	11–7
19	November 20	@ Portland	W 104–100	Spencer Haywood (25)			Memorial Coliseum; 6,634	12–7
20	November 21	Philadelphia	W 127–117	Don Smith (26)			Seattle Center Coliseum; 10,151	13–7
21	November 25	Los Angeles	L 115–139	Spencer Haywood (24)			Seattle Center Coliseum; 13,170	13–8
22	November 27	Detroit	W 124–102	Spencer Haywood (26)			Seattle Center Coliseum; 12,565	14–8
23	November 28	@ Los Angeles	L 121–138	Spencer Haywood (29)			The Forum; 15,544	14–9
24	November 30	@ New York	W 110–109	Lenny Wilkens (29)			Madison Square Garden; 18,111	15–9

December : 7–9 (home: 3–3; road: 4–6)

Game	Date	Team	Score	High points	High rebounds	High assists	Location Attendance	Record
25	December 1	@ Philadelphia	L 98–102	Spencer Haywood (36)			The Spectrum; 4,507	15–10
26	December 3	@ Baltimore	W 117–106	Spencer Haywood (35)			Baltimore Civic Center; 3,480	16–10
27	December 4	@ Cincinnati	W 100–98	Spencer Haywood (25)			Cincinnati Gardens; 2,643	17–10
28	December 5	@ Cleveland	W 99–91	Lenny Wilkens (27)			Cleveland Arena; 5,029	18–10
29	December 7	@ Milwaukee	L 83–116	Don Smith (21)			Milwaukee Arena; 9,061	18–11
30	December 10	Golden State	W 105–94	Spencer Haywood, Lenny Wilkens (21)			Seattle Center Coliseum; 12,928	19–11
31	December 12	@ Houston	L 98–100	Dick Snyder (23)			Hofheinz Pavilion; 2,751	19–12
32	December 14	@ Detroit	W 103–86	Spencer Haywood (31)			Cobo Arena; 3,465	20–12
33	December 15	@ Boston	L 100–112	Spencer Haywood (20)			Boston Garden; 9,225	20–13
34	December 17	@ Milwaukee	L 113–120	Spencer Haywood (36)			Milwaukee Arena; 9,360	20–14
35	December 18	Portland	W 107–105	Spencer Haywood (32)			Seattle Center Coliseum; 7,532	21–14
36	December 19	Phoenix	W 130–127 (OT)	Spencer Haywood (35)			Seattle Center Coliseum; 9,189	22–14
37	December 22	New York	L 104–120	Don Smith (17)			Seattle Center Coliseum; 11,953	22–15
38	December 25	@ Phoenix	L 86–116	Lenny Wilkens (19)			Arizona Veterans Memorial Coliseum; 6,565	22–16
39	December 26	Chicago	L 102–103	Spencer Haywood (26)			Seattle Center Coliseum; 10,240	22–17
40	December 30	Los Angeles	L 106–122	Spencer Haywood (34)			Seattle Center Coliseum; 13,106	22–18

January : 9–5 (home: 7–2; road: 2–3)

Game	Date	Team	Score	High points	High rebounds	High assists	Location Attendance	Record
41	January 1	Buffalo	W 97–83	Don Smith (23)			Seattle Center Coliseum; 8,676	23–18
42	January 4	@ Houston	L 110–119	Spencer Haywood, Lee Winfield (22)			Hofheinz Pavilion; 2,786	23–19
43	January 5	Atlanta	W 127–116	Lee Winfield (24)			Seattle Center Coliseum; 8,120	24–19
44	January 7	Cleveland	W 125–111	Spencer Haywood (48)			Seattle Center Coliseum; 8,169	25–19
45	January 9	Boston	W 125–119	Spencer Haywood (33)			Seattle Center Coliseum; 11,108	26–19
46	January 11	Houston	W 141–126	Spencer Haywood (35)			Seattle Center Coliseum; 6,404	27–19
47	January 13	Baltimore	W 112–107	Spencer Haywood (35)			Seattle Center Coliseum; 9,868	28–19
48	January 15	Phoenix	W 118–110	Spencer Haywood (34)			Seattle Center Coliseum; 12,693	29–19
49	January 21	Phoenix	L 113–128	Spencer Haywood (32)			Seattle Center Coliseum; 12,751	29–20
50	January 23	New York	L 99–101	Dick Snyder (26)			Seattle Center Coliseum; 12,261	29–21
51	January 25	@ Milwaukee	L 91–123	Spencer Haywood (15)			Milwaukee Arena; 9,046	29–22
52	January 26	@ Atlanta	W 131–119	Spencer Haywood (28)			Alexander Memorial Coliseum; 6,249	30–22
53	January 28	@ Buffalo	W 104–93	Don Smith (26)			Seattle Center Coliseum; 4,589	31–22
54	January 29	@ New York	L 106–110	Spencer Haywood (30)			Madison Square Garden; 19,588	31–23

February : 12–3 (home: 8–0; road: 4–3)

Game	Date	Team	Score	High points	High rebounds	High assists	Location Attendance	Record
55	February 1	@ Chicago	W 121–103	Spencer Haywood (27)			Chicago Stadium; 7,886	32–23
56	February 2	Houston	L 88–111	Spencer Haywood (27)			San Antonio, TX; 6,074	32–24
57	February 4	@ Cleveland	W 118–112	Lenny Wilkens (25)			Cleveland Arena; 3,038	33–24
58	February 6	@ Boston	L 123–128	Spencer Haywood (32)			Boston Garden; 7,246	33–25
59	February 8	Houston	W 127–119	Spencer Haywood (28)			Portland, OR; 9,000	34–25
60	February 10	Cincinnati	W 118–96	Spencer Haywood (28)			Seattle Center Coliseum; 7,523	35–25
61	February 12	Portland	W 125–97	Spencer Haywood (28)			Seattle Center Coliseum; 11,348	36–25
62	February 13	@ Portland	W 127–117 (OT)	Spencer Haywood (44)			Memorial Coliseum; 6,034	37–25
63	February 16	Boston	W 113–112	Spencer Haywood (26)			Seattle Center Coliseum; 12,120	38–25
64	February 18	Golden State	W 110–108	Lenny Wilkens (30)			Seattle Center Coliseum; 13,097	39–25
65	February 20	Portland	W 109–105	Dick Snyder (28)			Seattle Center Coliseum; 13,115	40–25
66	February 22	@ Golden State	L 104–120	Lenny Wilkens (26)			Oakland–Alameda County Coliseum Arena; 7,063	40–26
67	February 23	Detroit	W 97–96	Spencer Haywood (38)			Seattle Center Coliseum; 8,359	41–26
68	February 26	Cincinnati	W 122–106	Spencer Haywood (38)			Seattle Center Coliseum; 13,089	42–26
69	February 29	@ Baltimore	W 118–117 (OT)	Spencer Haywood (38)			Baltimore Civic Center; 6,187	43–26

March : 4–9 (home: 2–3; road: 2–6)

Game	Date	Team	Score	High points	High rebounds	High assists	Location Attendance	Record
70	March 1	@ Detroit	W 116–102	Lenny Wilkens (28)			Cobo Arena; 2,954	44–26
71	March 3	Chicago	W 112–103	Spencer Haywood (35)			Seattle Center Coliseum; 13,005	45–26
72	March 4	@ Golden State	L 96–114	Spencer Haywood (20)			Oakland–Alameda County Coliseum Arena; 13,502	45–27
73	March 5	Atlanta	W 112–110	Lee Winfield (18)			Seattle Center Coliseum; 13,021	46–27
74	March 7	Baltimore	L 98–105	Lenny Wilkens (19)			Seattle Center Coliseum; 12,507	46–28
75	March 9	Philadelphia	L 123–128	Lenny Wilkens (24)			Seattle Center Coliseum; 12,971	46–29
76	March 12	Milwaukee	L 99–109	Gar Heard (17)			Seattle Center Coliseum; 13,129	46–30
77	March 14	@ Chicago	W 115–111	Lee Winfield (38)			Chicago Stadium; 11,910	47–30
78	March 15	@ Atlanta	L 96–134	Lenny Wilkens (17)			Alexander Memorial Coliseum; 5,091	47–31
79	March 17	@ Baltimore	L 107–112	Lee Winfield (29)			Baltimore Civic Center; 4,346	47–32
80	March 19	@ Philadelphia	L 100–115	Lee Winfield (26)			The Spectrum; 9,828	47–33
81	March 25	@ Phoenix	L 99–118	Lee Winfield (28)			Arizona Veterans Memorial Coliseum; 10,189	47–34
82	March 26	@ Los Angeles	L 98–124	Gar Heard (21)			The Forum; 17,505	47–35

1971–72 season schedule

== Player statistics ==
Legend
GP	Games played	GS	Games started	MPG	Minutes per game
FG%	Field-goal percentage	3P%	3-point field-goal percentage	FT%	Free-throw percentage
RPG	Rebounds per game	APG	Assists per game	SPG	Steals per game
BPG	Blocks per game	PPG	Points per game

Player	GP	GS	MPG	FG%	3FG%	FT%	RPG	APG	SPG	BPG	PPG
Fred Brown	33	–	10.9	.328	–	.759	1.1	1.8	–	–	4.2
Barry Clemens	82	–	17.6	.521	–	.844	3.5	.8	–	–	7.1
Pete Cross	74	–	19.2	.428	–	.736	6.9	.9	–	–	5.5
Jake Ford	26	–	7.0	.500	–	.788	.4	1.0	–	–	3.5
Spencer Haywood	73	–	43.4	.461	–	.819	12.7	2.0	–	–	26.2
Gar Heard	58	–	25.8	.401	–	.617	7.6	.9	–	–	7.9
Don Kojis	73	–	25.4	.469	–	.793	4.6	1.1	–	–	11.4
Jim McDaniels	12	–	19.6	.415	–	.611	6.8	.8	–	–	9.4
Bob Rule	16	–	15.2	.363	–	.535	3.4	.4	–	–	7.1
Don Smith	58	–	30.7	.429	–	.720	11.3	2.1	–	–	13.8
Dick Snyder	73	–	34.7	.529	–	.842	3.1	3.9	–	–	16.6
Lenny Wilkens	80	–	37.4	.466	–	.774	4.2	9.6	–	–	18.0
Lee Winfield	81	–	25.2	.496	–	.668	2.7	3.6	–	–	10.6

== Awards and records ==
- Spencer Haywood was selected to the All-NBA First Team and made his first All-Star appearance at the 1972 NBA All-Star Game in Los Angeles.

== Injuries ==
- Spencer Haywood suffered a leg injury at the beginning of March and was out for the season.

== Transactions ==
=== Overview ===
Players Added	Players Lost
Via draft: Fred Brown; Jim McDaniels	Via trade: Don Kojis; Bob Rule; Retired: Tom Meschery; Rod Thorn

=== Trades ===
November 25, 1971	To Seattle SuperSonics	To Philadelphia 76ers
November 25, 1971	1972 second round pick (became Joby Wright); Future second round pick	Bob Rule
