= Jake Jones (basketball) =

American basketball player (born 1949)

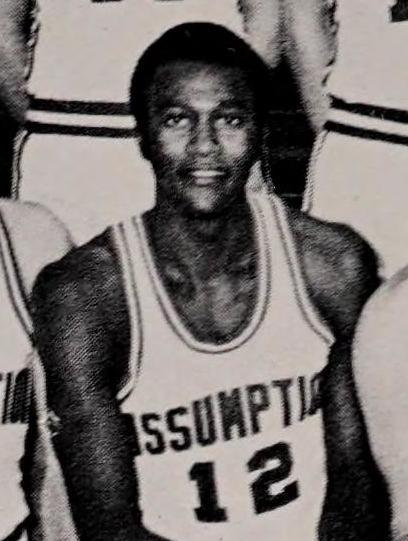
- Jones with Assumption in the 1970–71 season

Personal information
- Born: May 9, 1949 (age 77)
- Listed height: 6 ft 3 in (1.91 m)
- Listed weight: 180 lb (82 kg)

Career information
- High school: Neptune (Neptune Township, New Jersey)
- College: Assumption (1968–1971)
- NBA draft: 1971: 6th round, 97th overall pick
- Drafted by: Philadelphia 76ers
- Playing career: 1971–1977
- Position: Shooting guard
- Number: 36, 12

Career history
- 1971: Philadelphia 76ers
- 1971–1972: Cincinnati Royals
- 1971–1974: Trenton / Hamilton Pat Pavers
- 1974–1975; 1976–1977: Hazleton / Jersey Shore Bullets

Career highlights
- 2× NCAA Division II All-American (1970, 1971)
- Stats at NBA.com
- Stats at Basketball Reference
Medals
Men's basketball
Representing the United States
Universiade
Silver medal – second place	1970 Turin	United States

Jacob Jones (born May 9, 1949) is an American former professional basketball player. He played for the Philadelphia 76ers and Cincinnati Royals during the 1971–72 season after his collegiate career at Assumption College.

Jones played in the Eastern Basketball Association (EBA) for the Trenton / Hamilton Pat Pavers and Hazleton / Jersey Shore Bullets from 1971 to 1977.

== Career statistics ==
Legend
GP	Games played	GS	Games started	MPG	Minutes per game
FG%	Field goal percentage	3P%	3-point field goal percentage	FT%	Free throw percentage
RPG	Rebounds per game	APG	Assists per game	SPG	Steals per game
BPG	Blocks per game	PPG	Points per game	**Bold**	Career high

=== NBA ===
==== Regular season ====
Year	Team	GP	GS	MPG	FG%	FT%	RPG	APG	PPG
1971–72	Philadelphia	6	0	6.8	.333	**.700**	1.0	.3	3.2
1971–72	Cincinnati	**11**		**14.6**	**.407**	.619	**1.8**	**.9**	**5.2**
Career		17	0	11.9	.389	.645	1.5	.7	4.5
