= 1972 NBA Finals =

1972 basketball championship series

Team	Coach	Wins
Los Angeles Lakers	Bill Sharman	4
New York Knicks	Red Holzman	1
- Dates: April 26–May 7
- MVP: Wilt Chamberlain (Los Angeles Lakers)
- Hall of Famers: Lakers: Wilt Chamberlain (1979); Jerry West (1980); Gail Goodrich (1996); Pat Riley (2008, as a coach); Knicks: Jerry Lucas (1980); Willis Reed (1982; did not play); Bill Bradley (1983); Dave DeBusschere (1983); Walt Frazier (1987); Earl Monroe (1990); Phil Jackson (2007, as a coach); Dick Barnett (2024); Coaches: Red Holzman (1986); Bill Sharman (2004); Officials: Mendy Rudolph (2007)
- Eastern finals: Knicks defeated Celtics, 4–1
- Western finals: Lakers defeated Bucks, 4–2

The 1972 NBA World Championship Series was the championship round played at the conclusion of the 1971–72 National Basketball Association (NBA) season. The Western Conference champion Los Angeles Lakers defeated the Eastern Conference champion New York Knicks in five games to win their sixth NBA title and their first since 1954, when the team was still based in Minneapolis.

== Background ==
The 1972 NBA Finals was a rematch of the 1970 NBA Finals that the Knicks had won in a full seven-game series.

=== Los Angeles Lakers ===
Despite the retirement of legendary power forward Elgin Baylor, the Lakers won a then NBA-record 69 regular season games, including 33 wins in a row, a record for North American professional sports which still stands. The 69 wins would remain a record for the most wins in a season until the 1995–96 Chicago Bulls (who were coached by former Knicks player Phil Jackson) broke it en route to a 72-win season that also resulted in a championship. The Lakers were led by Wilt Chamberlain, the NBA's top rebounder that season. Guards Gail Goodrich and Jerry West were each among the NBA's top ten scorers. The Lakers were the league highest-scoring team, averaging 121 points per game. West also led the NBA in assists.

Los Angeles swept a solid 57-win Chicago Bulls team (the same Bulls team that took the Lakers to 7 games in the 1971 and 1973 playoffs) in the playoffs' opening round, then defeated the defending champion Milwaukee Bucks (record of 63–19) in six games to win the Western Conference finals. That historic series had matched Chamberlain against Kareem Abdul-Jabbar and West against Oscar Robertson.

=== New York Knicks ===
New York was a top defensive team that allowed just 98.2 points per game and made 47% of their shots as a team. They had defeated the 38-win Baltimore Bullets and then upset the 56-win Boston Celtics to win the Eastern Conference finals.

== Series summary ==
Game	Date	Home team	Result	Road team	Referees
Game 1	April 26	Los Angeles Lakers	92–114 (0–1)	New York Knicks	Richie Powers, Ed Rush
Game 2	April 30	Los Angeles Lakers	106–92 (1–1)	New York Knicks	Mendy Rudolph, Jack Madden
Game 3	May 3	New York Knicks	96–107 (1–2)	Los Angeles Lakers	Don Murphy, Richie Powers
Game 4	May 5	New York Knicks	111–116 (OT) (1–3)	Los Angeles Lakers	Mendy Rudolph, Jake O'Donnell
Game 5	May 7	Los Angeles Lakers	114–100 (4–1)	New York Knicks	Richie Powers, Jack Madden, Ed Rush (Alternate)

Lakers win series 4–1

== Game-by-game summary ==
=== Game 1 ===
April 26

New York Knicks 114, Los Angeles Lakers 92
Scoring by quarter: 33–28, 34–21, 19–19, 28–24
Pts: Bradley 29; Rebs: DeBusschere 18; Asts: Frazier 11	Pts: Goodrich 20; Rebs: Chamberlain 19; Asts: West 7
New York leads series, 1–0

The Forum, Inglewood, California
Attendance: 17,505
Referees: Richie Powers, Ed T. Rush

Willis Reed was out with a knee injury, but his replacement, Jerry Lucas, scored 26 points on 13 of 21 shooting to lead the Knicks to the win in the series opener. Lucas, a 6'9" center, was an excellent outside shooter. Chamberlain would not pursue him far from the basket and preferred to position for rebounds instead. The intelligent Lucas exploited this fact. But Lucas was not the only Knick who was red hot. Bill Bradley hit 11 of 12 shots from the field as New York shot 53 percent as a team for the game. The team took advantage of a nearly perfect first half to jump to a good lead and won easily, 114–92. New York hit 16 of their first 20 shots and led after each quarter. The win was considered a surprising upset. Dave DeBusschere added 19 points and 18 rebounds. Walt Frazier triple-doubled with 14 points, 11 assists and 12 rebounds. The high-scoring Lakers backcourt of Jerry West and Gail Goodrich shot a cold 11 of 37, and no Los Angeles players took up their slack.

=== Game 2 ===
April 30

New York Knicks 92, Los Angeles Lakers 106
Scoring by quarter: 26–30, 24–21, 11–28, 31-27
Pts: Frazier 21; Rebs: Jackson, Lucas 11 each Asts: Frazier 7	Pts: Goodrich 31; Rebs: Chamberlain 24; Asts: West 13
Series tied, 1–1

The Forum, Inglewood, California
Attendance: 17,505
Referees: Mendy Rudolph, Jack Madden

Heavily criticized for their Game 1 loss in the home opener, the Lakers looked to avenge themselves on their home court again. But at halftime, the Lakers' lead was just 51–50. Knicks forward DeBusschere, straining in position battles against the gigantic Chamberlain, hurt his side and did not play after the first half. The loss of DeBusschere, a key New York rebounder and defender, would badly hurt the team's chances from this point forward. He had played 43 minutes in Game 1, and the Knicks relied on him heavily. Also playing hurt was New York guard Earl Monroe. The Lakers' Gail Goodrich took advantage and netted 31 points. The still cold-shooting West simply passed and had 13 assists. Chamberlain took advantage of DeBusschere's absence and pulled down 24 rebounds, controlling the middle at both ends of the court. Lucas had foul trouble and sat much of the third quarter, with New York scoring just 11 points in the period. A New York rally in the fourth quarter could not stop a 106-92 Los Angeles win to even the series.

Both teams used short rotations during the series. Los Angeles played each of its starters 40 minutes or more in Game 2, with Chamberlain playing all 48. New York figured to do the same, but now had to deal with injury issues to DeBusschere and Monroe.

=== Game 3 ===
May 3

Los Angeles Lakers 107, New York Knicks 96
Scoring by quarter: 23–28, 29–19, 28–18, 27-31
Pts: Chamberlain 26; Rebs: Chamberlain, Hairston 20 each Asts: West 8	Pts: Frazier 25; Rebs: Lucas 14; Asts: Lucas 6
Los Angeles leads series, 2–1

Madison Square Garden, Manhattan, New York
Attendance: 19,588
Referees: Don Murphy, Richie Powers

The Knicks' Dave DeBusschere was listed as doubtful for Game Three. Despite injury issues, New York fans were optimistic as the series now headed to Madison Square Garden, where the Knicks went 5-0 vs. the Bullets and Celtics in route to the Finals. The Knicks had gotten their ' split ' in two games in Los Angeles, and now had a chance to take control of the series. DeBusschere gamely attempted to play in the first half, but simply could not overcome his injury. He missed all six of his field-goal attempts. He was hurting and elected not to play in the second half. DeBusschere explained: "I didn't feel I was helping the team". Lucas, the star of Game 1, tried to take up DeBusschere's slack. He hit 11 of 21 shots for 23 total points and 14 rebounds in 47 minutes of play. He also added a team-high six assists. Frazier added 25 points himself. Bradley went a cold 5 of 17. The Lakers led 52–47 at the half, and with DeBusschere out, took over the game again in the third quarter. Chamberlain and Laker forward Happy Hairston collected 20 rebounds apiece, with the Laker giant also adding 26 points on 9 of 10 shooting. West and Goodrich combined for 46 points, and Los Angeles danced out to a 22-point lead and took a 2–1 lead in the series with a 107–96 win. Nineteen thousand five-hundred New York fans watched the contest.

=== Game 4 ===
May 5

Los Angeles Lakers 116, New York Knicks 111 (OT)
Scoring by quarter: 26–28, 27-28, 25-25, 23-20, Overtime: 15-10
Pts: West 28; Rebs: Chamberlain 24; Asts: West 7	Pts: Bradley 30; Rebs: DeBusschere 13; Asts: Lucas 11
Los Angeles leads series, 3–1

Madison Square Garden, Manhattan, New York
Attendance: 19,588
Referees: Mendy Rudolph, Jake O'Donnell

The Knicks felt that Game 4 was a must-win game. DeBusschere vowed to play, lasting 48 minutes and pulling down a team-high 13 rebounds. New York led 56–53 at the half. After an even third quarter, the Lakers rallied in the fourth. West made a clutch basket to give the Lakers the lead with seconds left, but a Frazier tip-in over Chamberlain evened the score. West missed at the buzzer, sending the game into overtime tied 101-101. The Lakers would outscore New York 15–10 in the extra frame to win 116-111 and take a commanding 3–1 series lead back to Los Angeles.

All five Los Angeles starters played at least 45 minutes in Game 4, with Lakers coach Bill Sharman using just seven players total. Chamberlain played all 53 minutes and had 24 rebounds. The Laker starting guards combined for 56 points to again key the team.

In the game New York had two players that played at least 50 minutes. Lucas played all 53 minutes, and had 25 points on 11-22 shooting, with 11 assists and eight rebounds. Frazier had 24 points, eight rebounds and eight assists in 50 minutes.

This was the first championship series game officiated by Jake O'Donnell, who was precluded from working playoff games during his first four seasons in the NBA due to his career as a professional baseball umpire. O'Donnell was called up to the American League in September 1968 and was in Major League Baseball through the 1971 American League Championship Series, when he left the diamond to focus on basketball. O'Donnell would officiate in the championship series (renamed the NBA Finals in 1986) every year through 1994.

=== Game 5 ===
May 7

New York Knicks 100, Los Angeles Lakers 114
Scoring by quarter: 24-26, 29-27, 25-30, 22-31
Pts: Frazier 31; Rebs: DeBusschere 14; Asts: Frazier 10	Pts: Goodrich 25; Rebs: Chamberlain 29; Asts: West 9
Los Angeles wins the series, 4–1

The Forum, Inglewood, California
Attendance: 17,505
Referees: Richie Powers, Jack Madden

Chamberlain was listed as doubtful for Game Five with a sprained right wrist.

The Lakers returned home looking to win their first title in Los Angeles. After playing to a 53-all tie at halftime, The Lakers finally pulled away from the tired Knicks in the second half.

Chamberlain dominated the middle, flirting with what would've been a quadruple-double with 24 points, 29 rebounds, eight blocks and eight assists in 47 minutes. Blocked shots were not an official NBA stat at that time, but ABC announcer Keith Jackson counted them up during the broadcast. West and Goodrich combined for 48 points.

Walt Frazier had 31 points, 10 assists, and seven rebounds in 47 minutes for the Knicks.

The Lakers won 114-100 to claim their first NBA Championship in Los Angeles. For the series, Chamberlain averaged 19.4 points and 23.2 rebounds and was named Finals Most Valuable Player.

West had averaged 19.8 points and 8.8 assists, and Goodrich averaged 25.2 points for the series.

== Team rosters ==
=== Los Angeles Lakers ===
1971–72 Los Angeles Lakers roster
Players

Pos.	No.	Player	Height	Weight	DOB	From
C	13	Wilt Chamberlain	7 ft 1 in (2.16 m)	275 lb (125 kg)	1936-08-21	Kansas
G	11	Jim Cleamons	6 ft 3 in (1.91 m)	185 lb (84 kg)	1949-09-13	Ohio State
C	14	Leroy Ellis	6 ft 10 in (2.08 m)	210 lb (95 kg)	1940-03-10	St. John's
F	24	Keith Erickson	6 ft 5 in (1.96 m)	195 lb (88 kg)	1944-04-19	UCLA
G	25	Gail Goodrich	6 ft 1 in (1.85 m)	170 lb (77 kg)	1943-04-23	UCLA
F	52	Happy Hairston	6 ft 7 in (2.01 m)	255 lb (116 kg)	1942-05-31	NYU
F	5	Jim McMillian	6 ft 5 in (1.96 m)	225 lb (102 kg)	1948-03-11	Columbia
G	12	Pat Riley	6 ft 4 in (1.93 m)	205 lb (93 kg)	1945-03-20	Kentucky
G	21	Flynn Robinson	6 ft 1 in (1.85 m)	185 lb (84 kg)	1941-04-28	Wyoming
F	31	John Trapp	6 ft 7 in (2.01 m)	210 lb (95 kg)	1945-10-02	UNLV
G	44	Jerry West	6 ft 3 in (1.91 m)	175 lb (79 kg)	1938-05-28	West Virginia

Coaches
Head coach
- Bill Sharman

Legend
- (DP) Unsigned draft pick
- (FA) Free agent
- (S) Suspended
- Injured

=== New York Knicks ===
1971–72 New York Knicks roster
Players

Pos.	No.	Player	Height	Weight	DOB	From
SG	12	Dick Barnett	6 ft 4 in (1.93 m)	190 lb (86 kg)	1936-10-02	Tennessee State
SF	24	Bill Bradley	6 ft 5 in (1.96 m)	205 lb (93 kg)	1943-07-28	Princeton
PF	22	Dave DeBusschere	6 ft 6 in (1.98 m)	220 lb (100 kg)	1940-10-16	Detroit Mercy
PG	10	Walt Frazier	6 ft 4 in (1.93 m)	200 lb (91 kg)	1945-03-29	Southern Illinois
PF	18	Phil Jackson	6 ft 8 in (2.03 m)	220 lb (100 kg)	1945-09-17	North Dakota
F/C	32	Jerry Lucas	6 ft 8 in (2.03 m)	230 lb (104 kg)	1940-03-30	Ohio State
G	7	Dean Meminger	6 ft 0 in (1.83 m)	175 lb (79 kg)	1948-05-13	Marquette
G	15	Earl Monroe	6 ft 3 in (1.91 m)	185 lb (84 kg)	1944-11-21	Winston-Salem State
C	19	Willis Reed	6 ft 9 in (2.06 m)	235 lb (107 kg)	1942-06-25	Grambling State

Coaches
Head coach
- Red Holzman

Legend
- (DP) Unsigned draft pick
- (FA) Free agent
- (S) Suspended
- Injured

== Aftermath ==
The teams would meet again in the finals the following year, as the Knicks would get their revenge. In a reversal of the 1972 series, the Knicks would win four in a row after losing the opener to win their second NBA title in four years.

Wilt Chamberlain's 1972 NBA Finals Game 5 ‘Championship Clinching’ game worn Los Angeles Lakers jersey sold $4,900,000, the highest price sold for any jersey until Michael Jordan's 1998 'Last Shot' jersey sold for $10,091,000.

The Lakers' next championship came in 1980 over the Philadelphia 76ers in six games, with Bill Sharman as the team's general manager, Jerry West as a executive/scout, and Pat Riley as assistant coach.

== See also ==
- 1971-72 NBA season
- 1972 NBA playoffs
