= Lee Winfield =

American basketball player and coach

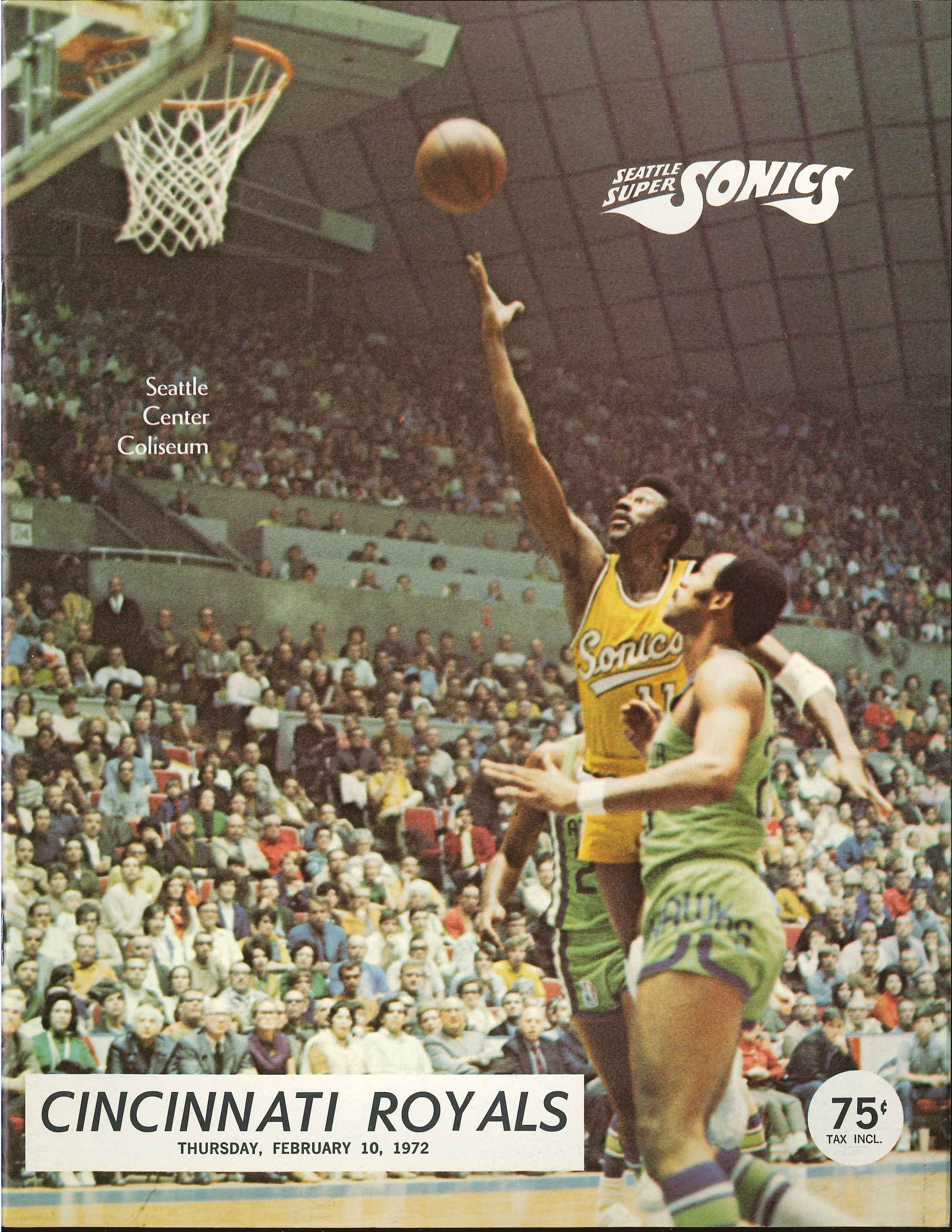
- Lee Winfield, 1972 (yellow).

Personal information
- Born: February 4, 1947 St. Louis, Missouri, U.S.
- Died: February 4, 2011 (aged 64) St. Louis, Missouri, U.S.
- Listed height: 6 ft 2 in (1.88 m)
- Listed weight: 174 lb (79 kg)

Career information
- High school: Sumner (St. Louis, Missouri)
- College: Missouri Baptist (1965–1967); North Texas (1967–1969)
- NBA draft: 1969: 3rd round, 32nd overall pick
- Drafted by: Seattle SuperSonics
- Playing career: 1969–1976
- Position: Point guard
- Number: 11, 3

Career history
- 1969–1973: Seattle SuperSonics
- 1973–1975: Buffalo Braves
- 1975–1976: Kansas City Kings

Career highlights
- NCAA Division II All-American (1969)

Career NBA statistics
- Points: 2,959 (7.3 ppg)
- Rebounds: 828 (2.1 rpg)
- Assists: 1,003 (2.5 apg)
- Stats at NBA.com
- Stats at Basketball Reference

Leroy Winfield (February 4, 1947 – February 4, 2011) was an American professional basketball player.

A 6'2" guard from North Texas State University, Winfield played in the National Basketball Association from 1969 to 1976 as a member of the Seattle SuperSonics, Buffalo Braves, and Kansas City Kings. His most productive seasons came in 1970–71 and 1971–72 when he averaged more than 10 points a game with Seattle. He was also a member of the Braves' 1974 and 1975 playoff teams. He averaged 7.3 points per game in his professional career.

Winfield later worked as an assistant coach at Saint Louis University, the University of Missouri, and St. Louis Community College.

He died on his 64th birthday after suffering from colon cancer.

== Career statistics ==
Legend
GP	Games played	GS	Games started	MPG	Minutes per game
FG%	Field goal percentage	3P%	3-point field goal percentage	FT%	Free throw percentage
RPG	Rebounds per game	APG	Assists per game	SPG	Steals per game
BPG	Blocks per game	PPG	Points per game	**Bold**	Career high

=== NBA ===
==== Regular season ====
Year	Team	GP	MPG	FG%	FT%	RPG	APG	SPG	BPG	PPG
1969–70	Seattle	64	12.0	.479	**.750**	1.5	1.6			5.7
1970–71	Seattle	79	20.3	.466	.664	2.4	2.8			10.5
1971–72	Seattle	**81**	**25.2**	.496	.668	**2.7**	**3.6**			**10.6**
1972–73	Seattle	53	20.0	.431	.574	2.4	3.5			6.6
1973–74	Buffalo	36	12.0	.352	.635	1.2	1.3	.4	.1	3.0
1974–75	Buffalo	68	18.5	**.526**	.721	1.9	2.0	**.6**	**.4**	5.5
1975–76	Kansas City	22	9.7	.485	.643	1.1	.9	.5	.3	3.3
Career		403	18.3	.474	.668	2.1	2.5	.5	.3	7.3

==== Playoffs ====
Year	Team	GP	MPG	FG%	FT%	RPG	APG	SPG	BPG	PPG
1974	Buffalo	1	**12.0**	.000	.500	**3.0**	**2.0**	**1.0**	.0	1.0
1975	Buffalo	**6**	10.8	**.438**	**.600**	1.3	1.5	.3	**.2**	**2.8**
Career		7	11.0	.389	.571	1.6	1.6	.4	.1	2.6
