= Fred Hilton =

American basketball player (born 1948)

Personal information
- Born: January 15, 1948 (age 78) New Orleans, Louisiana, U.S.
- Listed height: 6 ft 3 in (1.91 m)
- Listed weight: 185 lb (84 kg)

Career information
- High school: McKinley (Baton Rouge, Louisiana)
- College: Grambling State (1967–1971)
- NBA draft: 1971: 2nd round, 19th overall pick
- Drafted by: Buffalo Braves
- Position: Shooting guard
- Number: 32

Career history
- 1971–1973: Buffalo Braves

Career highlights
- Second-team Parade All-American (1967)
- Stats at NBA.com
- Stats at Basketball Reference

Frederick Gayle Hilton (born January 15, 1948) is an American former professional basketball shooting guard who played two seasons in the National Basketball Association (NBA) as a member of the Buffalo Braves (1971–73). He attended Grambling State University where he was drafted in the second round of the 1971 NBA draft by the Braves.

== Career statistics ==
Legend
GP	Games played	GS	Games started	MPG	Minutes per game
FG%	Field goal percentage	3P%	3-point field goal percentage	FT%	Free throw percentage
RPG	Rebounds per game	APG	Assists per game	SPG	Steals per game
BPG	Blocks per game	PPG	Points per game	**Bold**	Career high

=== NBA ===
==== Regular season ====
Year	Team	GP	MPG	FG%	FT%	RPG	APG	PPG
1971–72	Buffalo	**61**	**22.9**	**.389**	.738	**2.6**	**1.9**	**11.6**
1972–73	Buffalo	59	12.4	.387	**.774**	1.7	1.3	7.2
Career		120	17.3	.388	.749	2.1	1.6	9.4
