= 1971–72 Cleveland Cavaliers season =

NBA professional basketball team season

- Head coach: Bill Fitch
- Arena: Cleveland Arena

Results
- Record: 23–59 (.280)
- Place: Division: 4th (Central); Conference: 7th (Eastern)
- Playoff finish: Did not qualify
- Stats at Basketball Reference

Local media
- Television: WEWS-TV
- Radio: WERE

The 1971–72 Cleveland Cavaliers season was the second season of NBA basketball in Cleveland, Ohio. The Cavaliers finished the season with a 23–59 record, finishing last in the Central Division and 7th in the Eastern Conference. Rookie top pick Austin Carr was named to the All-Rookie team and John Johnson and Butch Beard were named All-Stars.

== Offseason ==
=== Trades ===
August 13: Forward Greg Howard obtained from the Phoenix Suns in exchange for undisclosed future draft choices and an undisclosed amount of cash.

== Draft picks ==
Round	Pick	Player	Position	Nationality	College/Club team
1	1	Austin Carr	SG/SF	United States	Notre Dame
2	18	Steve Patterson	C	United States	UCLA
2	35	Willie Long	PF/C	United States	New Mexico

- Note: This table only lists players drafted through the second round.

== Roster ==
1971–72 Cleveland Cavaliers roster
Players

Pos.	No.	Player	Height	Weight	DOB	From
G	21	Butch Beard	6 ft 3 in (1.91 m)	185 lb (84 kg)	May 4, 1947	Louisville
G	22	Austin Carr	6 ft 4 in (1.93 m)	200 lb (91 kg)	Mar. 10, 1948	Notre Dame
G	18	Charlie Davis	6 ft 2 in (1.88 m)	160 lb (73 kg)	Sep. 7, 1949	Wake Forest
F	40	Greg Howard	6 ft 9 in (2.06 m)	215 lb (98 kg)	Jan. 8, 1948	New Mexico
F	32	John Johnson	6 ft 7 in (2.01 m)	200 lb (91 kg)	Oct. 18, 1947	Iowa
C	50	Steve Patterson	6 ft 9 in (2.06 m)	225 lb (102 kg)	Jun. 24, 1948	UCLA
G	23	Jackie Ridgle	6 ft 4 in (1.93 m)	195 lb (88 kg)	Feb. 13, 1948	California
F/C	30	Rick Roberson	6 ft 9 in (2.06 m)	231 lb (105 kg)	Jul. 7, 1947	Cincinnati
G/F	7	Bingo Smith	6 ft 5 in (1.96 m)	195 lb (88 kg)	Feb. 26, 1946	Tulsa
F	15	Dave Sorenson	6 ft 8 in (2.03 m)	225 lb (102 kg)	Jul. 8, 1948	Ohio State
G	11	John Warren	6 ft 3 in (1.91 m)	180 lb (82 kg)	Jul. 7, 1947	St. John's
G	17	Bobby Washington	5 ft 11 in (1.80 m)	175 lb (79 kg)	Jul. 11, 1947	Eastern Kentucky
C	44	Walt Wesley	6 ft 11 in (2.11 m)	220 lb (100 kg)	Jan. 25, 1945	Kansas

Coaches
Head coach
- Bill Fitch
Assistant(s)
- Jimmy Rodgers

Legend
- (DP) Unsigned draft pick
- (FA) Free agent
- (S) Suspended
- Injured

== Regular season ==
=== Season standings ===
Central Division	W	L	PCT	GB	Home	Road	Neutral	Div
y-Baltimore Bullets	38	44	.463	–	18–15	16–24	4–5	9–9
x-Atlanta Hawks	36	46	.439	2	22–19	13–26	1–1	9–9
Cincinnati Royals	30	52	.366	8	20–18	8–32	2–2	11–9
Cleveland Cavaliers	23	59	.280	15	13–28	8–30	2–1	9–11

#	Eastern Conference			
#	Team	W	L	PCT
1	z-Boston Celtics	56	26	.683
2	y-Baltimore Bullets	38	44	.463
3	x-New York Knicks	48	34	.585
4	x-Atlanta Hawks	36	46	.439
5	Philadelphia 76ers	30	52	.366
5	Cincinnati Royals	30	52	.366
7	Cleveland Cavaliers	23	59	.280
8	Buffalo Braves	22	60	.268

== Game log ==
=== October ===
Record: 2–8; Home: 0–6; Road: 1–2; Neutral: 1–0

#	Date	H/A/N	Opponent	W/L	Score	Record	
1	October 15	H	Buffalo Braves	L	109–111 (OT)	0–1	
2	October 16	A	Buffalo Braves	W	93–89	1–1	
3	October 17	H	New York Knicks	L	120–121 (OT)	1–2	
4	October 19	A	Milwaukee Bucks	L	82–116	1–3	
5	October 20	H	San Francisco Warriors	L	98–115	1–4	
6	October 23	N	Baltimore Bullets	W	109–101	2–4	at College Park, Maryland
7	October 24	H	Philadelphia 76ers	L	93–111	2–5	
8	October 27	A	Philadelphia 76ers	L	106–120	2–6	
9	October 29	H	Atlanta Hawks	L	97–98	2–7	
10	October 31	H	Milwaukee Bucks	L	102–118	2–8	

=== November ===
Record: 6–6; Home: 4–2; Road: 2–4

#	Date	H/A/N	Opponent	W/L	Score	Record
11	November 5	H	Phoenix Suns	L	87–107	2–9
12	November 7	H	Portland Trail Blazers	W	120–99	3–9
13	November 11	A	Seattle SuperSonics	L	91–110	3–10
14	November 12	A	Portland Trail Blazers	W	106–104	4–10
15	November 14	A	Phoenix Suns	L	105–119	4–11
16	November 16	A	Los Angeles Lakers	L	90–108	4–12
17	November 19	A	Portland Trail Blazers	L	105–118	4–13
18	November 21	H	Boston Celtics	L	105–128	4–14
19	November 23	H	Baltimore Bullets	W	104–102	5–14
20	November 26	H	Cincinnati Royals	W	128–114	6–14
21	November 27	A	Atlanta Hawks	W	103–95	7–14
22	November 28	H	Philadelphia 76ers	W	124–120	8–14

=== December ===
Record: 7–10; Home: 5–4; Road: 1–6; Neutral: 1–0

#	Date	H/A/N	Opponent	W/L	Score	Record	
23	December 1	H	Houston Rockets	W	116–106	9–14	
24	December 3	A	Buffalo Braves	L	90–91	9–15	
25	December 5	H	Seattle SuperSonics	L	91–99	9–16	
26	December 7	A	Chicago Bulls	L	99–115	9–17	
27	December 8	A	Boston Celtics	L	107–126	9–18	
28	December 10	H	Detroit Pistons	W	112–111	10–18	
29	December 11	A	Cincinnati Royals	L	95–103	10–19	
30	December 12	H	New York Knicks	L	92–103	10–20	
31	December 14	A	Baltimore Bullets	W	88–85	11–20	
32	December 17	H	Boston Celtics	L	109–115	11–21	
33	December 18	A	New York Knicks	L	84–104	11–22	
34	December 19	H	Chicago Bulls	L	101–119	11–23	
35	December 22	A	Detroit Pistons	L	94–104	11–24	
36	December 23	H	Atlanta Hawks	W	115–110	12–24	
37	December 26	H	Baltimore Bullets	W	108–102	13–24	
38	December 28	H	Portland Trail Blazers	W	112–111	14–24	
39	December 29	N	Philadelphia 76ers	W	103–102	15–24	at Hershey, Pennsylvania

=== January ===
Record: 1–13; Home: 0–5; Road: 1–6; Neutral: 0–2

#	Date	H/A/N	Opponent	W/L	Score	Record	
40	January 2	H	Philadelphia 76ers	L	119–148	15–25	
41	January 5	H	Los Angeles Lakers	L	103–113	15–26	
42	January 7	A	Seattle SuperSonics	L	111–125	15–27	
43	January 8	A	Portland Trail Blazers	L	102–125	15–28	
44	January 11	N	San Francisco Warriors	L	92–101	15–29	at Oakland, California
45	January 14	A	Phoenix Suns	L	107–117	15–30	
46	January 15	A	Houston Rockets	L	109–112	15–31	
47	January 16	N	Cincinnati Royals	L	108–128	15–32	at Las Cruces, New Mexico
48	January 21	A	Milwaukee Bucks	L	91–120	15–33	
49	January 22	A	Cincinnati Royals	L	96–113	15–34	
50	January 25	H	San Francisco Warriors	L	111–117	15–35	
51	January 26	A	Boston Celtics	W	112–108	16–35	
52	January 29	H	Cincinnati Royals	L	118–120	16–36	
53	January 30	H	Buffalo Braves	L	98–99	16–37	

=== February ===
Record: 4–12; Home: 3–6; Road: 1–6

#	Date	H/A/N	Opponent	W/L	Score	Record
54	February 1	A	Buffalo Braves	W	104–99	17–37
55	February 2	A	Detroit Pistons	L	108–133	17–38
56	February 4	H	Seattle SuperSonics	L	112–118	17–39
57	February 5	A	Atlanta Hawks	L	117–120	17–40
58	February 6	H	Buffalo Braves	L	108–121	17–41
59	February 8	A	Chicago Bulls	L	90–114	17–42
60	February 9	H	Milwaukee Bucks	L	121–126	17–43
61	February 12	A	New York Knicks	L	91–106	17–44
62	February 13	H	Detroit Pistons	L	121–136	17–45
63	February 16	A	Philadelphia 76ers	L	116–121	17–46
64	February 18	H	Cincinnati Royals	W	133–109	18–46
65	February 19	A	Cincinnati Royals	L	92–112	18–47
66	February 20	H	New York Knicks	W	111–109	19–47
67	February 23	H	Boston Celtics	L	111–113	19–48
68	February 25	H	Portland Trail Blazers	W	113–104	20–48
69	February 27	H	Phoenix Suns	L	125–127	20–49

=== March ===
Record: 3–10; Home: 1–5; Road: 2–4; Neutral: 0–1

#	Date	H/A/N	Opponent	W/L	Score	Record	
70	March 1	A	Boston Celtics	L	105–115	20–50	
71	March 4	A	Houston Rockets	W	130–123	21–50	
72	March 7	N	San Francisco Warriors	L	112–119	21–51	at Oakland
73	March 10	A	Los Angeles Lakers	L	98–132	21–52	
74	March 12	A	Atlanta Hawks	L	114–135	21–53	
75	March 14	A	Baltimore Bullets	W	127–118 (OT)	22–53	
76	March 16	H	Baltimore Bullets	L	101–105	22–54	
77	March 18	H	Chicago Bulls	L	91–109	22–55	
78	March 19	H	Atlanta Hawks	L	105–115	22–56	
79	March 22	H	Los Angeles Lakers	W	124–120	23–56	
80	March 24	H	Houston Rockets	L	119–127	23–57	
81	March 25	A	New York Knicks	L	83–98	23–58	
82	March 26	H	Cincinnati Royals	L	122–135	23–59	

1971–72 game log
Total: 23–59 (Home: 13–28; Road: 8–30; Neutral: 2–1)
October: 2–8 (home: 0–6; road: 2–2)

Game	Date	Team	Score	High points	High rebounds	High assists	Location Attendance	Record
9	October 29, 1971	Atlanta	L 97–98				Cleveland Arena; 3,442	2–7

November: 6–6 (home: 4–2; road: 2–4)

Game	Date	Team	Score	High points	High rebounds	High assists	Location Attendance	Record
21	November 27, 1971	@ Atlanta	W 103–95				Alexander Memorial Coliseum; 5,101	7–14

December: 7–10 (home: 5–4; road: 2–6)

Game	Date	Team	Score	High points	High rebounds	High assists	Location Attendance	Record
36	December 23, 1971	Atlanta	W 115–110				Cleveland Arena; 4,562	12–24

January: 1–13 (home: 0–5; road: 1–8)

Game	Date	Team	Score	High points	High rebounds	High assists	Location Attendance	Record

February: 4–12 (home: 3–6; road: 1–6)

Game	Date	Team	Score	High points	High rebounds	High assists	Location Attendance	Record
57	February 5, 1972	@ Atlanta	L 117–120				Alexander Memorial Coliseum; 6,281	17–40

March: 3–10 (home: 1–5; road: 2–5)

Game	Date	Team	Score	High points	High rebounds	High assists	Location Attendance	Record
74	March 12, 1972	@ Atlanta	L 114–135				Alexander Memorial Coliseum; 4,915	21–53
78	March 19, 1972	Atlanta	L 105–115				Cleveland Arena; 8,049	22–56

1971–72 schedule

== Awards and honors ==
- Austin Carr, NBA All-Rookie Team First Team
