= 1971–72 Buffalo Braves season =

NBA professional basketball team season

- Head coach: Dolph Schayes (0–1); Johnny McCarthy (22–59)
- Arena: Buffalo Memorial Auditorium; Maple Leaf Gardens

Results
- Record: 22–60 (.268)
- Place: Division: 4th (Atlantic); Conference: 8th (Eastern)
- Playoff finish: Did not qualify
- Stats at Basketball Reference

Local media
- Television: WBEN-TV
- Radio: WBEN

The 1971–72 NBA season was the Buffalo Braves' second season in the NBA. A pair of rookies named Smith gave Buffalo fans reason for a bright future. On October 13, head coach Dolph Schayes was dismissed after losing the season opener and was replaced by Johnny McCarthy for the rest of the season. The Braves repeated their 22–60 record from their inaugural season, and occupied the Atlantic Division basement. Elmore Smith and Randy Smith each had out standing rookie seasons with Elmore averaging 17.3 points per game and 15.2 rebounds per game, while Randy added 13.4 points per game.

== Draft picks ==
Round	Pick	Player	Position	Nationality	College
1	3	Elmore Smith	Center	United States	Kentucky State
2	19	Fred Hilton	Guard	United States	Grambling
2	26	Amos Thomas	Forward	United States	Southwestern Oklahoma
2	30	Spencer Haywood	Forward	United States	Detroit Mercy
4	53	Jim O'Brien	Guard	United States	Boston College
5	70	Garry Nelson	Forward	United States	Duquesne
6	87	Glen Summors	Forward	United States	Gannon
7	104	Randy Smith	Guard	United States	Buffalo State
8	121	Craig Love	Center	United States	Ohio
9	138	Gary Stewart	Forward	United States	Canisius College
10	154	Don Ward	Guard	United States	Colgate University
11	170	Bill Warner	Forward	United States	Arizona
12	184	Butch Webster	Forward	United States	LSU
13	197	Pete Smith	Forward	United States	Valdosta
14	209	Ray Lavender	Center	United States	Drury College
15	218	William Chatmon	Forward	United States	Baylor
16	226	James Douglas	Guard	United States	Memphis
17	230	Nelson Isley	Guard	United States	LSU
18	233	Joey Meyer	Guard	United States	DePaul

== Roster ==
1971–72 Buffalo Braves roster
Players

Pos.	No.	Player	Height	Weight	DOB	From
G	7	Emmette Bryant	6 ft 1 in (1.85 m)	175 lb (79 kg)		DePaul
F	40	Jerry Chambers	6 ft 5 in (1.96 m)	190 lb (86 kg)		Utah
G	13	Mike Davis	6 ft 3 in (1.91 m)	185 lb (84 kg)		Virginia Union
G	20	Dick Garrett	6 ft 3 in (1.91 m)	185 lb (84 kg)		Southern Illinois
G	42	Walt Hazzard	6 ft 3 in (1.91 m)	185 lb (84 kg)		UCLA
G	32	Fred Hilton	6 ft 3 in (1.91 m)	185 lb (84 kg)		Grambling State
F	25	Bill Hosket	6 ft 7 in (2.01 m)	228 lb (103 kg)		Ohio State
F	45	John Hummer	6 ft 9 in (2.06 m)	230 lb (104 kg)		Princeton
F	44	Bob Kauffman	6 ft 8 in (2.03 m)	240 lb (109 kg)		Guilford
C	3	Elmore Smith	7 ft 1 in (2.16 m)	250 lb (113 kg)		Kentucky State
F	9	Randy Smith	6 ft 3 in (1.91 m)	185 lb (84 kg)		Buffalo State
F	35	Cornell Warner	6 ft 9 in (2.06 m)	220 lb (100 kg)		Jackson State

Coaches
Head coach
- Dolph Schayes
- Johnny McCarthy
Assistant(s)
- Johnny McCarthy

Legend
- (DP) Unsigned draft pick
- (FA) Free agent
- (S) Suspended
- Injured

== Regular season ==
=== Season standings ===
Atlantic Division	W	L	PCT	GB	Home	Road	Neutral	Div
y-Boston Celtics	56	26	.683	–	32–9	21–16	3–1	15–3
x-New York Knicks	48	34	.585	8	27–14	20–19	1–1	11–7
Philadelphia 76ers	30	52	.366	26	14–23	14–26	2–3	6–12
Buffalo Braves	22	60	.268	34	13–27	8–31	1–2	4–14

#	Eastern Conference			
#	Team	W	L	PCT
1	z-Boston Celtics	56	26	.683
2	y-Baltimore Bullets	38	44	.463
3	x-New York Knicks	48	34	.585
4	x-Atlanta Hawks	36	46	.439
5	Philadelphia 76ers	30	52	.366
5	Cincinnati Royals	30	52	.366
7	Cleveland Cavaliers	23	59	.280
8	Buffalo Braves	22	60	.268

z – clinched division title
y – clinched division title
x – clinched playoff spot

=== Game log ===
1971–72 Game log
#	Date	Opponent	Score	High points	Record
1	October 12	Seattle	123–90	Chambers, Hazzard (14)	0–1
2	October 15	@ Cleveland	111–109 (OT)	Walt Hazzard (35)	1–1
3	October 16	Cleveland	93–89	Bob Kauffman (24)	1–2
4	October 19	Los Angeles	123–106	Elmore Smith (20)	1–3
5	October 22	@ Milwaukee	105–124	Dick Garrett (19)	1–4
6	October 23	Boston	103–98	Bob Kauffman (25)	1–5
7	October 26	@ Golden State	91–89	Bob Kauffman (24)	2–5
8	October 28	@ Seattle	96–106	Bob Kauffman (27)	2–6
9	October 29	@ Portland	120–119	Fred Hilton (27)	3–6
10	October 31	@ Houston	87–102	Bob Kauffman (15)	3–7
11	November 3	Phoenix	100–98	Bob Kauffman (24)	3–8
12	November 5	@ Atlanta	122–117 (OT)	Randy Smith (35)	4–8
13	November 6	Chicago	99–130	Bob Kauffman (28)	5–8
14	November 9	Portland	100–109	Bob Kauffman (30)	6–8
15	November 13	Milwaukee	127–106	Bob Kauffman (44)	6–9
16	November 16	Cincinnati	98–102	Walt Hazzard (27)	7–9
17	November 19	@ Baltimore	105–126	Jerry Chambers (19)	7–10
18	November 20	Detroit	105–96	Walt Hazzard (23)	7–11
19	November 23	Atlanta	97–102	Walt Hazzard (30)	8–11
20	November 24	@ Boston	100–108	Fred Hilton (23)	8–12
21	November 27	Golden State	110–91	Bob Kauffman (17)	8–13
22	November 30	Houston	115–101	Walt Hazzard (26)	8–14
23	December 2	N Baltimore	109–105	Mike Davis (25)	9–14
24	December 3	Cleveland	90–91	Bob Kauffman (23)	10–14
25	December 4	@ New York	90–130	Chambers, R. Smith (13)	10–15
26	December 7	Cincinnati	91–115	Fred Hilton (26)	11–15
27	December 10	Portland	101–100 (OT)	Randy Smith (21)	11–16
28	December 14	Philadelphia	110–117	Walt Hazzard (26)	12–16
29	December 15	N Milwaukee	122–108	Bob Kauffman (29)	12–17
30	December 17	New York	115–95	Randy Smith (19)	12–18
31	December 18	@ Boston	91–124	Walt Hazzard (15)	12–19
32	December 21	Los Angeles	117–103	Randy Smith (26)	12–20
33	December 25	@ Atlanta	117–140	Randy Smith (24)	12–21
34	December 27	Philadelphia	121–112	Randy Smith (24)	12–22
35	December 28	@ Los Angeles	87–105	Elmore Smith (32)	12–23
36	December 30	@ Phoenix	102–123	Walt Hazzard (25)	12–24
37	January 1	@ Seattle	83–97	Elmore Smith (21)	12–25
38	January 2	@ Portland	90–108	Fred Hilton (26)	12–26
39	January 4	@ Golden State	86–112	Elmore Smith (22)	12–27
40	January 7	Phoenix	123–110	Walt Hazzard (23)	12–28
41	January 8	@ Cincinnati	97–87	Bob Kauffman (28)	13–28
42	January 9	@ Detroit	96–101	Elmore Smith (22)	13–29
43	January 11	Cincinnati	109–107 (OT)	Bob Kauffman (25)	13–30
44	January 12	@ Philadelphia	111–109	Elmore Smith (26)	14–30
45	January 14	Portland	102–100	Bob Kauffman (28)	14–31
46	January 21	Chicago	113–93	Walt Hazzard (15)	14–32
47	January 25	Atlanta	123–110	Fred Hilton (21)	14–33
48	January 26	@ Baltimore	114–115 (OT)	Walt Hazzard (30)	14–34
49	January 28	Seattle	104–93	Elmore Smith (23)	14–35
50	January 30	@ Cleveland	99–98	Walt Hazzard (26)	15–35
51	February 1	Cleveland	104–99	Walt Hazzard (26)	15–36
52	February 2	@ Philadelphia	104–119	Bob Kauffman (24)	15–37
53	February 4	New York	103–84	Walt Hazzard (17)	15–38
54	February 5	@ Chicago	96–130	Elmore Smith (24)	15–39
55	February 6	@ Cleveland	121–108	Walt Hazzard (38)	16–39
56	February 8	Milwaukee	126–108	Fred Hilton (30)	16–40
57	February 9	@ Boston	112–139	Bob Kauffman (23)	16–41
58	February 11	Detroit	88–95	Bob Kauffman (21)	17–41
59	February 12	@ Detroit	87–113	Elmore Smith (17)	17–42
60	February 13	@ Atlanta	119–133	Mike Davis (28)	17–43
61	February 15	Golden State	103–100	Mike Davis (23)	17–44
62	February 18	Houston	108–96	Bob Kauffman (19)	17–45
63	February 19	@ New York	95–100	Elmore Smith (27)	17–46
64	February 22	Baltimore	98–99	Bob Kauffman (26)	18–46
65	February 24	N Cincinnati	108–97	Elmore Smith (23)	18–47
66	February 25	Boston	117–115	Elmore Smith (40)	18–48
67	February 29	Atlanta	99–89	Elmore Smith (23)	18–49
68	March 1	@ Philadelphia	99–108	Kauffman, E. Smith (19)	18–50
69	March 3	New York	97–105	Fred Hilton (31)	19–50
70	March 5	@ Phoenix	103–131	Randy Smith (24)	19–51
71	March 7	@ Portland	94–98	Elmore Smith (24)	19–52
72	March 11	@ Houston	100–121	Dick Garrett (17)	19–53
73	March 12	@ Los Angeles	102–141	Walt Hazzard (25)	19–54
74	March 14	Philadelphia	105–108	Elmore Smith (33)	20–54
75	March 17	@ Chicago	103–126	Randy Smith (19)	20–55
76	March 18	Detroit	103–116	Elmore Smith (32)	21–55
77	March 19	@ Cincinnati	105–136	Randy Smith (22)	21–56
78	March 21	Baltimore	100–114	Elmore Smith (29)	22–56
79	March 22	@ New York	99–123	Randy Smith (19)	22–57
80	March 24	@ Detroit	105–112	Randy Smith (33)	22–58
81	March 25	Boston	121–116	Elmore Smith (27)	22–59
82	March 26	@ Baltimore	101–119	Hilton, Warner (18)	22–60

== Player statistics ==
Note: GP= Games played; MPG = Minutes per game; FG% = Field goal percentage; FT% = Free throw percentage; RPG = Rebounds per game; APG = Assists per game; PPG = Points per game

Player	GP	MPG	FG%	FT%	RPG	APG	PPG
Bob Kauffman	77	41.6	.497	.795	10.2	3.9	18.9
Elmore Smith	78	40.8	.454	.534	15.2	1.4	17.3
Walt Hazzard	72	33.2	.451	.782	3.0	5.6	15.8
Randy Smith	76	27.6	.482	.622	4.8	2.5	13.4
Dick Garrett	73	26.1	.442	.866	3.1	2.3	10.8
Em Bryant	54	22.6	.459	.600	2.4	3.8	5.1
Fred Hilton	61	22.1	.389	.738	2.6	1.9	11.6
John Hummer	55	21.6	.390	.468	4.2	1.3	5.2
Cornell Warner	62	20.0	.443	.744	6.1	0.9	6.2
Mike Davis	62	17.2	.425	.767	1.9	1.3	9.1
Jerry Chambers	26	14.2	.433	.688	2.6	0.9	6.8
Bill Hosket	44	13.5	.492	.808	2.8	0.9	5.0

== Awards and honors ==
- Bob Kauffman, NBA All-Star

== Transactions ==
The Braves were involved in the following transactions during the 1971–72 season.

=== Coaching Change ===
In-season
Outgoing coach	Date Removed	1971–72 Record	Incoming coach
Dolph Schayes	Fired, October 13, 1971	0–1	Johnny McCarthy

=== Trades ===
July 26, 1971
To Buffalo Braves

- Walt Hazzard
- Jerry Chambers
To Atlanta Hawks

- Don May
- Herm Gilliam

=== Free agents ===
==== Additions ====
Player	Signed	Former team

==== Subtractions ====
Player	Left	New team
Nate Bowman	free agency, July 1	Pittsburgh Condors
Paul Long	free agency, July 1	Portland Trail Blazers
Mike Lynn	free agency, July 1	Utah Stars
Mike Silliman	free agency, July 1	Retired
George Wilson	free agency, July 1	Retired
