= 1971–72 Cincinnati Royals season =

NBA professional basketball team season

- Head coach: Bob Cousy
- General manager: Joe Axelson
- Owners: Max Jacobs; Jeremy Jacobs
- Arena: Cincinnati Gardens

Results
- Record: 30–52 (.366)
- Place: Division: 3rd (Central); Conference: 5th (Eastern)
- Playoff finish: Did not qualify
- Stats at Basketball Reference

Local media
- Television: WLWT
- Radio: WLW

The 1971–72 season would be the Royals final season in Cincinnati. The franchise continued to struggle and missed the playoffs for the 5th year in a row. The Royals finished the season with a record of 30 wins and 52 losses. Prior to the season, the Royals were sold to a group of 10 businessmen from Kansas City. The new ownership group paid $5 million for the franchise and a decision was reached to move the team after the season. The franchise would relocate west where they would be reborn as the Kansas City-Omaha Kings.

== Roster ==
1971-72 Cincinnati Royals roster
Players

Pos.	No.	Player	Height	Weight	DOB	From
G	10	Nate Archibald	6 ft 1 in (1.85 m)	165 lb (75 kg)		UTEP
F	43	Sid Catlett	6 ft 6 in (1.98 m)	230 lb (104 kg)		Notre Dame
F	33	Ken Durrett	6 ft 7 in (2.01 m)	190 lb (86 kg)		La Salle
C	41	Jim Fox	6 ft 10 in (2.08 m)	230 lb (104 kg)		South Carolina
G	12	Jake Jones	6 ft 3 in (1.91 m)	180 lb (82 kg)		Assumption
C	44	Sam Lacey	6 ft 10 in (2.08 m)	235 lb (107 kg)		New Mexico State
G	15	John Mengelt	6 ft 2 in (1.88 m)	195 lb (88 kg)		Auburn
F	5	Tom Van Arsdale	6 ft 5 in (1.96 m)	202 lb (92 kg)		Indiana
G/F	22	Nate Williams	6 ft 5 in (1.96 m)	215 lb (98 kg)		Utah State

Coaches
Head coach
- Bob Cousy

Legend
- (DP) Unsigned draft pick
- (FA) Free agent
- (S) Suspended
- Injured

== Regular season ==
=== Season standings ===
Central Division	W	L	PCT	GB	Home	Road	Neutral	Div
y-Baltimore Bullets	38	44	.463	–	18–15	16–24	4–5	9–9
x-Atlanta Hawks	36	46	.439	2	22–19	13–26	1–1	9–9
Cincinnati Royals	30	52	.366	8	20–18	8–32	2–2	11–9
Cleveland Cavaliers	23	59	.280	15	13–28	8–30	2–1	9–11

#	Eastern Conference			
#	Team	W	L	PCT
1	z-Boston Celtics	56	26	.683
2	y-Baltimore Bullets	38	44	.463
3	x-New York Knicks	48	34	.585
4	x-Atlanta Hawks	36	46	.439
5	Philadelphia 76ers	30	52	.366
5	Cincinnati Royals	30	52	.366
7	Cleveland Cavaliers	23	59	.280
8	Buffalo Braves	22	60	.268

=== Game log ===
1971–72 Game log
#	Date	Opponent	Score	High points	Record
1	October 12	Atlanta	113–127	Tom Van Arsdale (34)	1–0
2	October 19	Seattle	101–100	Nate Archibald (26)	1–1
3	October 23	@ Portland	100–104	Tom Van Arsdale (26)	1–2
4	October 24	@ Seattle	101–119	Tom Van Arsdale (26)	1–3
5	October 26	@ Phoenix	99–126	Tom Van Arsdale (31)	1–4
6	October 29	@ Los Angeles	107–119	Tom Van Arsdale (23)	1–5
7	October 30	@ Golden State	112–116	Tom Van Arsdale (30)	1–6
8	November 3	Philadelphia	100–124	Tom Van Arsdale (32)	2–6
9	November 6	Phoenix	95–110	Tom Van Arsdale (27)	3–6
10	November 8	N Boston	109–120	Nate Williams (26)	3–7
11	November 10	New York	85–99	Nate Archibald (22)	4–7
12	November 13	Golden State	101–110	Johnny Green (22)	5–7
13	November 16	@ Buffalo	98–102	Nate Williams (27)	5–8
14	November 17	Baltimore	113–103	Nate Archibald (25)	5–9
15	November 19	@ Boston	110–106	Nate Archibald (27)	6–9
16	November 23	@ New York	110–125	Nate Archibald (24)	6–10
17	November 24	Portland	112–114	Nate Archibald (33)	7–10
18	November 26	@ Cleveland	114–128	Archibald, Fox (33)	7–11
19	November 27	Milwaukee	114–81	Nate Archibald (25)	7–12
20	November 30	@ Baltimore	118–103	Nate Williams (29)	8–12
21	December 1	Chicago	109–101	Nate Archibald (42)	8–13
22	December 3	@ Milwaukee	82–120	Nate Archibald (25)	8–14
23	December 4	Seattle	100–98	Nate Archibald (27)	8–15
24	December 7	@ Buffalo	91–115	Nate Archibald (21)	8–16
25	December 8	Philadelphia	115–109	Nate Archibald (26)	8–17
26	December 10	@ Philadelphia	113–106 (OT)	Jim Fox (27)	9–17
27	December 11	Cleveland	95–103	Nate Archibald (26)	10–17
28	December 12	Boston	96–83	Jim Fox (31)	10–18
29	December 15	Phoenix	127–108	John Mengelt (23)	10–19
30	December 16	@ Detroit	101–107	Tom Van Arsdale (23)	10–20
31	December 18	Houston	126–116	Tom Van Arsdale (35)	10–21
32	December 19	@ Atlanta	99–101	Tom Van Arsdale (23)	10–22
33	December 22	Atlanta	106–103	Nate Archibald (40)	10–23
34	December 25	Boston	99–94	Nate Archibald (24)	10–24
35	December 28	@ Baltimore	87–119	Nate Archibald (19)	10–25
36	December 29	Golden State	107–102	Tom Van Arsdale (22)	10–26
37	January 1	@ New York	94–104	Nate Archibald (31)	10–27
38	January 5	Milwaukee	115–106	Sam Lacey (23)	10–28
39	January 7	@ Detroit	132–151	Nate Archibald (41)	10–29
40	January 8	Buffalo	97–87	Nate Archibald (31)	10–30
41	January 9	@ Chicago	104–108 (OT)	Nate Archibald (26)	10–31
42	January 11	@ Buffalo	109–107 (OT)	Nate Archibald (29)	11–31
43	January 12	Los Angeles	107–108	Tom Van Arsdale (31)	12–31
44	January 14	Atlanta	102–126	Nate Archibald (43)	13–31
45	January 16	N Cleveland	108–128	Nate Archibald (41)	14–31
46	January 20	Houston	104–87	Nate Archibald (27)	14–32
47	January 22	Cleveland	96–113	Nate Archibald (36)	15–32
48	January 23	@ Baltimore	101–132	Nate Archibald (28)	15–33
49	January 26	@ Philadelphia	102–113	Nate Archibald (42)	15–34
50	January 28	Baltimore	132–124	Nate Archibald (30)	15–35
51	January 29	@ Cleveland	120–118	Nate Archibald (36)	16–35
52	February 2	New York	105–116	Nate Archibald (49)	17–35
53	February 4	@ Boston	109–122	Tom Van Arsdale (32)	17–36
54	February 5	Detroit	132–133 (OT)	Nate Archibald (45)	18–36
55	February 6	@ Chicago	94–119	Nate Archibald (24)	18–37
56	February 8	@ Portland	100–104	Nate Archibald (25)	18–38
57	February 10	@ Seattle	96–118	Tom Van Arsdale (22)	18–39
58	February 12	@ Phoenix	95–117	Tom Van Arsdale (27)	18–40
59	February 13	@ Houston	111–112	Tom Van Arsdale (44)	18–41
60	February 15	@ Los Angeles	118–125	Nate Archibald (30)	18–42
61	February 17	Milwaukee	111–97	Nate Archibald (30)	18–43
62	February 18	@ Cleveland	109–133	Nate Archibald (31)	18–44
63	February 19	Cleveland	92–112	Nate Williams (33)	19–44
64	February 20	@ Atlanta	101–92	Tom Van Arsdale (31)	20–44
65	February 23	Portland	106–110	Nate Archibald (55)	21–44
66	February 24	N Buffalo	108–97	Nate Archibald (32)	22–44
67	February 25	@ Los Angeles	88–109	John Mengelt (32)	22–45
68	February 26	@ Seattle	106–122	Nate Archibald (29)	22–46
69	February 29	@ Golden State	120–128	Nate Archibald (38)	22–47
70	March 1	N Houston	108–96	Nate Archibald (32)	22–48
71	March 5	@ Boston	125–114	Archibald, Van Arsdale (39)	23–48
72	March 8	Phoenix	105–122	Nate Archibald (35)	24–48
73	March 10	Chicago	100–104	Nate Archibald (34)	25–48
74	March 12	Golden State	106–117	Nate Archibald (46)	26–48
75	March 15	Los Angeles	121–116	Nate Archibald (33)	26–49
76	March 18	@ Atlanta	106–115	Nate Archibald (38)	26–50
77	March 19	Buffalo	105–136	Nate Archibald (45)	27–50
78	March 21	@ Detroit	117–120	Nate Archibald (37)	27–51
79	March 22	Detroit	130–135	Nate Archibald (46)	28–51
80	March 24	Baltimore	114–132	Nate Archibald (38)	29–51
81	March 25	@ Milwaukee	95–119	Nate Archibald (22)	29–52
82	March 26	@ Cleveland	135–122	Nate Archibald (45)	30–52

== Awards and honors ==
- Tiny Archibald, All-NBA Second Team
