= 1971–72 Atlanta Hawks season =

NBA professional basketball team season

- Head coach: Richie Guerin
- Arena: Alexander Memorial Coliseum

Results
- Record: 36–46 (.439)
- Place: Division: 2nd (Central); Conference: 4th (Eastern)
- Playoff finish: East Conference Semifinals (Lost to Celtics 2–4)
- Stats at Basketball Reference

Local media
- Television: WQXI-TV
- Radio: WQXI

The 1971–72 Atlanta Hawks season was the Hawks' 23rd season in the NBA and fourth season in Atlanta. This was the team's final season at the Alexander Memorial Coliseum, before moving to the Omni Coliseum in the following season; they would return to Alexander Memorial Coliseum from 1997 to 1999 following Omni's demolition. The team finished with 36 wins and 46 wins, advancing to the playoffs, where they would lose in the semifinals to the Boston Celtics after six games.

== Roster ==
Atlanta Hawks roster
Players

Pos.	No.	Player	Height	Weight	DOB	From
F	10	Don Adams	6 ft 6 in (1.98 m)	210 lb (95 kg)		Northwestern
C	8	Walt Bellamy	6 ft 11 in (2.11 m)	225 lb (102 kg)		Indiana
C	31	Bob Christian	6 ft 10 in (2.08 m)	255 lb (116 kg)		Grambling State
G	3	Herm Gilliam	6 ft 3 in (1.91 m)	190 lb (86 kg)		Purdue
G	42	Jeff Halliburton	6 ft 5 in (1.96 m)	193 lb (88 kg)		Drake
G/F	23	Lou Hudson	6 ft 5 in (1.96 m)	210 lb (95 kg)		Minnesota
G	44	Pete Maravich	6 ft 5 in (1.96 m)	197 lb (89 kg)		LSU
G	22	Don May	6 ft 4 in (1.93 m)	220 lb (100 kg)		Dayton
PG	20	Larry Siegfried	6 ft 3 in (1.91 m)	190 lb (86 kg)		Ohio State
F	12	Jim Washington	6 ft 6 in (1.98 m)	210 lb (95 kg)		Villanova

Coaches
Head coach
- Richie Guerin

Legend
- (DP) Unsigned draft pick
- (FA) Free agent
- (S) Suspended
- Injured

== Regular season ==
=== Season standings ===
Central Division	W	L	PCT	GB	Home	Road	Neutral	Div
y-Baltimore Bullets	38	44	.463	–	18–15	16–24	4–5	9–9
x-Atlanta Hawks	36	46	.439	2	22–19	13–26	1–1	9–9
Cincinnati Royals	30	52	.366	8	20–18	8–32	2–2	11–9
Cleveland Cavaliers	23	59	.280	15	13–28	8–30	2–1	9–11

#	Eastern Conference			
#	Team	W	L	PCT
1	z-Boston Celtics	56	26	.683
2	y-Baltimore Bullets	38	44	.463
3	x-New York Knicks	48	34	.585
4	x-Atlanta Hawks	36	46	.439
5	Philadelphia 76ers	30	52	.366
5	Cincinnati Royals	30	52	.366
7	Cleveland Cavaliers	23	59	.280
8	Buffalo Braves	22	60	.268

z – clinched division title
y – clinched division title
x – clinched playoff spot

=== Game log ===
1971–72 Game log
#	Date	Opponent	Score	High points	Record
1	October 12	@ Cincinnati	113–127	Lou Hudson (26)	0–1
2	October 16	Philadelphia	104–102	Lou Hudson (32)	0–2
3	October 20	Los Angeles	126–104	Lou Hudson (37)	0–3
4	October 22	Boston	115–108	Lou Hudson (31)	0–4
5	October 23	@ New York	95–89	Lou Hudson (27)	1–4
6	October 25	@ Boston	116–136	Herm Gilliam (25)	1–5
7	October 27	New York	96–110	Lou Hudson (28)	2–5
8	October 29	@ Cleveland	98–97	Don May (28)	3–5
9	October 30	Detroit	104–99	Walt Bellamy (41)	3–6
10	November 3	Chicago	113–100	Lou Hudson (32)	3–7
11	November 5	Buffalo	122–117 (OT)	George Trapp (34)	3–8
12	November 6	@ Philadelphia	96–101	Milt Williams (24)	3–9
13	November 10	Milwaukee	116–110	Lou Hudson (41)	3–10
14	November 12	Golden State	104–106	Lou Hudson (28)	4–10
15	November 17	Seattle	112–104	Walt Bellamy (28)	4–11
16	November 20	Phoenix	109–115	Walt Bellamy (29)	5–11
17	November 23	@ Buffalo	97–102	Jim Washington (25)	5–12
18	November 24	@ Milwaukee	107–141	Walt Bellamy (26)	5–13
19	November 26	Baltimore	118–105	Jim Washington (23)	5–14
20	November 27	Cleveland	103–95	Jim Washington (22)	5–15
21	November 28	@ Boston	108–130	Bellamy, Hudson (15)	5–16
22	November 30	@ Chicago	85–86	Lou Hudson (30)	5–17
23	December 1	@ Detroit	117–103	Lou Hudson (26)	6–17
24	December 4	Philadelphia	109–126	Lou Hudson (30)	7–17
25	December 7	N Golden State	113–116	Lou Hudson (30)	8–17
26	December 9	@ Phoenix	115–135	Lou Hudson (41)	8–18
27	December 10	@ Houston	88–95	Lou Hudson (27)	8–19
28	December 12	@ Los Angeles	95–104	Walt Bellamy (22)	8–20
29	December 15	Houston	117–115 (OT)	Lou Hudson (34)	8–21
30	December 17	@ Baltimore	103–114	Pete Maravich (31)	8–22
31	December 18	Baltimore	94–123	Walt Bellamy (23)	9–22
32	December 19	Cincinnati	99–101	Pete Maravich (27)	10–22
33	December 22	@ Cincinnati	106–103	Pete Maravich (28)	11–22
34	December 23	@ Cleveland	110–115	Walt Bellamy (21)	11–23
35	December 25	Buffalo	117–140	Walt Bellamy (40)	12–23
36	December 26	@ Milwaukee	92–114	Lou Hudson (27)	12–24
37	December 27	Portland	121–135	Lou Hudson (31)	13–24
38	December 30	@ Houston	115–129	Lou Hudson (28)	13–25
39	January 2	@ Phoenix	116–111	Walt Bellamy (30)	14–25
40	January 4	@ Portland	103–91	Walt Bellamy (24)	15–25
41	January 5	@ Seattle	116–127	Walt Bellamy (30)	15–26
42	January 7	Los Angeles	134–90	Pete Maravich (17)	15–27
43	January 8	@ Baltimore	102–110	Pete Maravich (26)	15–28
44	January 12	Milwaukee	102–104	Walt Bellamy (29)	16–28
45	January 14	@ Cincinnati	102–126	Lou Hudson (28)	16–29
46	January 15	Boston	122–106	Jim Washington (27)	16–30
47	January 16	Philadelphia	116–124	Pete Maravich (50)	17–30
48	January 21	Golden State	113–111	Lou Hudson (36)	17–31
49	January 23	@ Milwaukee	118–113	Pete Maravich (35)	18–31
50	January 25	@ Buffalo	123–110	Pete Maravich (28)	19–31
51	January 26	Seattle	131–119	Walt Bellamy (36)	19–32
52	January 28	Detroit	106–124	Lou Hudson (30)	20–32
53	January 30	@ Phoenix	103–105	Walt Bellamy (27)	20–33
54	February 3	@ Golden State	115–132	George Trapp (26)	20–34
55	February 5	Cleveland	117–120	Pete Maravich (50)	21–34
56	February 6	@ Houston	113–120	Lou Hudson (27)	21–35
57	February 9	Los Angeles	117–113	Pete Maravich (28)	21–36
58	February 11	@ Chicago	91–102	Walt Bellamy (18)	21–37
59	February 12	Chicago	117–106	Lou Hudson (36)	21–38
60	February 13	Buffalo	119–133	Lou Hudson (41)	22–38
61	February 15	@ Detroit	113–105	Lou Hudson (26)	23–38
62	February 16	Baltimore	103–105	Pete Maravich (30)	24–38
63	February 18	@ Baltimore	81–106	Walt Bellamy (23)	24–39
64	February 20	Cincinnati	101–92	Lou Hudson (20)	24–40
65	February 23	Phoenix	118–120	Jim Washington (28)	25–40
66	February 25	N Philadelphia	114–110	Lou Hudson (23)	25–41
67	February 27	Portland	110–113	Lou Hudson (32)	26–41
68	February 29	@ Buffalo	99–89	Pete Maravich (33)	27–41
69	March 3	@ Los Angeles	104–114	Adams, Bellamy (21)	27–42
70	March 4	@ Portland	120–101	Lou Hudson (34)	28–42
71	March 5	@ Seattle	110–112	Lou Hudson (29)	28–43
72	March 8	Chicago	98–96	Lou Hudson (33)	28–44
73	March 12	Cleveland	114–135	Lou Hudson (31)	29–44
74	March 14	@ New York	107–115	Walt Bellamy (26)	29–45
75	March 15	Seattle	96–134	Lou Hudson (30)	30–45
76	March 17	@ Detroit	112–121	Walt Bellamy (30)	30–46
77	March 18	Cincinnati	106–115	Pete Maravich (32)	31–46
78	March 19	@ Cleveland	115–105	Herm Gilliam (30)	32–46
79	March 21	@ Philadelphia	117–111	Lou Hudson (36)	33–46
80	March 22	Houston	106–107	Lou Hudson (27)	34–46
81	March 24	Golden State	102–118	Pete Maravich (23)	35–46
82	March 26	New York	106–120	Pete Maravich (27)	36–46

== Playoffs ==
1972 playoff game log
Conference Semifinals: 2–4 (home: 2–1; road: 0–3)

Game	Date	Team	Score	High points	High rebounds	High assists	Location Attendance	Series
1	March 29	@ Boston	L 108–126	Lou Hudson (29)	Don Adams (12)	Herm Gilliam (8)	Boston Garden; 12,815	0–1
2	March 31	Boston	W 113–104	Lou Hudson (41)	Walt Bellamy (18)	Herm Gilliam (9)	Alexander Memorial Coliseum; 6,955	1–1
3	April 2	@ Boston	L 113–136	Pete Maravich (37)	Jim Washington (11)	Pete Maravich (6)	Boston Garden; 12,094	1–2
4	April 4	Boston	W 112–110	Pete Maravich (36)	Walt Bellamy (15)	Don Adams (4)	Alexander Memorial Coliseum; 7,192	2–2
5	April 7	@ Boston	L 114–124	three players tied (21)	Walt Bellamy (13)	Pete Maravich (8)	Boston Garden; 15,315	2–3
6	April 9	Boston	L 118–127	Pete Maravich (37)	Walt Bellamy (15)	Pete Maravich (5)	Alexander Memorial Coliseum; 7,192	2–4

1972 schedule
