= 1971–72 New York Knicks season =

Season of National Basketball Association team the New York Knicks

- Conference champions
- Head coach: Red Holzman
- General manager: Red Holzman
- Arena: Madison Square Garden

Results
- Record: 48–34 (.585)
- Place: Division: 2nd (Atlantic); Conference: 3rd (Eastern)
- Playoff finish: NBA Finals (lost to Lakers 1–4)
- Stats at Basketball Reference

Local media
- Television: WOR-TV; Manhattan Cable Television
- Radio: WNBC

The 1971–72 New York Knicks season was the 26th season for the team in the National Basketball Association (NBA). The Knicks compiled a 48–34 record in the regular season to finish second in the Atlantic Division and earn a berth in the NBA Playoffs for the sixth consecutive year. New York had acquired Earl Monroe in a trade with the Baltimore Bullets in November 1971.

In the first round of the playoffs, New York faced the Baltimore Bullets, who had defeated the Knicks in the Eastern Conference Finals the previous year. The Knicks won the series in six games and advanced to the conference finals, where they faced the Boston Celtics. With a 4–1 series victory, New York made the NBA Finals for the second time in three seasons. In the Finals, the Knicks were opposed by the Los Angeles Lakers, whom they had beaten in the 1970 NBA Finals. After winning Game 1 of the Finals 114–92 in Los Angeles, the Knicks lost the next four games and the series. Willis Reed only played 11 games in the regular season and missed the entirety of the playoffs with a knee injury.

== Draft picks ==
Round	Pick	Player	Position	Nationality	School/Club team
1	16	Dean Meminger	G	United States	Marquette
2	34	Gregg Northington	F	United States	Alabama State
3	50	Kenny Mayfield	G	United States	Tuskegee

== Roster ==
1971–72 New York Knicks roster
Players

Pos.	No.	Player	Height	Weight	DOB	From
SG	12	Dick Barnett	6 ft 4 in (1.93 m)	190 lb (86 kg)	1936-10-02	Tennessee State
SF	24	Bill Bradley	6 ft 5 in (1.96 m)	205 lb (93 kg)	1943-07-28	Princeton
PF	22	Dave DeBusschere	6 ft 6 in (1.98 m)	220 lb (100 kg)	1940-10-16	Detroit Mercy
PG	10	Walt Frazier	6 ft 4 in (1.93 m)	200 lb (91 kg)	1945-03-29	Southern Illinois
PF	18	Phil Jackson	6 ft 8 in (2.03 m)	220 lb (100 kg)	1945-09-17	North Dakota
F/C	32	Jerry Lucas	6 ft 8 in (2.03 m)	230 lb (104 kg)	1940-03-30	Ohio State
G	7	Dean Meminger	6 ft 0 in (1.83 m)	175 lb (79 kg)	1948-05-13	Marquette
G	42	Eddie Miles	6 ft 4 in (1.93 m)	195 lb (88 kg)	1940-07-05	Seattle
G	15	Earl Monroe	6 ft 3 in (1.91 m)	185 lb (84 kg)	1944-11-21	Winston-Salem State
F	16	Charlie Paulk	6 ft 8 in (2.03 m)	219 lb (99 kg)	1946–06–14	Northeastern State
C	23	Luther Rackley	6 ft 10 in (2.08 m)	220 lb (100 kg)	1946-06-11	Xavier
C	19	Willis Reed	6 ft 9 in (2.06 m)	235 lb (107 kg)	1942-06-25	Grambling State

Coaches
Head coach
- Red Holzman

Legend
- (DP) Unsigned draft pick
- (FA) Free agent
- (S) Suspended
- Injured

== Regular season ==
=== Season standings ===
Atlantic Division	W	L	PCT	GB	Home	Road	Neutral	Div
y-Boston Celtics	56	26	.683	–	32–9	21–16	3–1	15–3
x-New York Knicks	48	34	.585	8	27–14	20–19	1–1	11–7
Philadelphia 76ers	30	52	.366	26	14–23	14–26	2–3	6–12
Buffalo Braves	22	60	.268	34	13–27	8–31	1–2	4–14

#	Eastern Conference			
#	Team	W	L	PCT
1	z-Boston Celtics	56	26	.683
2	y-Baltimore Bullets	38	44	.463
3	x-New York Knicks	48	34	.585
4	x-Atlanta Hawks	36	46	.439
5	Philadelphia 76ers	30	52	.366
5	Cincinnati Royals	30	52	.366
7	Cleveland Cavaliers	23	59	.280
8	Buffalo Braves	22	60	.268

z – clinched division title
y – clinched division title
x – clinched playoff spot

=== Game log ===
1971–72 game log
#	Date	Opponent	Score	High points	Record
1	October 12	Detroit	91–84	Willis Reed (20)	0–1
2	October 16	Los Angeles	119–104	Bill Bradley (17)	0–2
3	October 17	@ Cleveland	121–120 (OT)	Willis Reed (28)	1–2
4	October 19	Golden State	84–93	Bill Bradley (23)	2–2
5	October 22	@ Baltimore	110–87	Dean Meminger (25)	3–2
6	October 23	Atlanta	95–89	Willis Reed (25)	3–3
7	October 26	Boston	101–106	DeBusschere, Frazier (22)	4–3
8	October 27	@ Atlanta	96–110	Walt Frazier (20)	4–4
9	October 28	Houston	94–112	Barnett, DeBusschere (26)	5–4
10	October 30	Philadelphia	108–101	Jerry Lucas (28)	5–5
11	November 3	@ Houston	117–98	Walt Frazier (31)	6–5
12	November 5	@ Seattle	97–101	Walt Frazier (28)	6–6
13	November 7	@ Los Angeles	96–103	Jerry Lucas (20)	6–7
14	November 10	@ Cincinnati	85–99	Barnett, Frazier (15)	6–8
15	November 11	Golden State	112–103	Walt Frazier (30)	6–9
16	November 13	Detroit	105–127	Walt Frazier (24)	7–9
17	November 16	Phoenix	111–112	Walt Frazier (39)	8–9
18	November 20	Baltimore	114–125	Dave DeBusschere (35)	9–9
19	November 23	Cincinnati	110–125	Walt Frazier (23)	10–9
20	November 24	@ Baltimore	114–94	Walt Frazier (28)	11–9
21	November 26	@ Boston	104–89	Walt Frazier (25)	12–9
22	November 27	Chicago	99–100	Walt Frazier (27)	13–9
23	November 30	Seattle	110–109	Dave DeBusschere (29)	13–10
24	December 3	@ Chicago	96–122	Walt Frazier (19)	13–11
25	December 4	Buffalo	90–130	Walt Frazier (25)	14–11
26	December 7	Boston	105–97	Walt Frazier (25)	14–12
27	December 11	Portland	102–134	Walt Frazier (29)	15–12
28	December 12	@ Cleveland	103–92	Walt Frazier (30)	16–12
29	December 14	Phoenix	110–100	Dick Barnett (25)	16–13
30	December 17	@ Buffalo	115–95	Walt Frazier (39)	17–13
31	December 18	Cleveland	84–104	Walt Frazier (25)	18–13
32	December 21	@ Golden State	113–87	Walt Frazier (27)	19–13
33	December 22	@ Seattle	120–104	Walt Frazier (28)	20–13
34	December 23	@ Portland	120–117	Walt Frazier (36)	21–13
35	December 25	Golden State	89–114	Walt Frazier (36)	22–13
36	December 28	@ Detroit	119–100	Walt Frazier (30)	23–13
37	December 30	Baltimore	110–102	Frazier, Monroe (21)	23–14
38	January 1	Cincinnati	94–104	Walt Frazier (41)	24–14
39	January 3	Milwaukee	99–101	Walt Frazier (31)	25–14
40	January 4	@ Milwaukee	100–121	Walt Frazier (21)	25–15
41	January 7	@ Philadelphia	113–117	Walt Frazier (32)	25–16
42	January 8	Chicago	113–108	Walt Frazier (30)	25–17
43	January 11	@ Chicago	91–116	Walt Frazier (24)	25–18
44	January 14	N Golden State	111–115	Dick Barnett (26)	25–19
45	January 16	@ Houston	109–108	Walt Frazier (31)	26–19
46	January 20	@ Phoenix	109–130	Walt Frazier (21)	26–20
47	January 21	@ Los Angeles	104–101	Jerry Lucas (26)	27–20
48	January 23	@ Seattle	101–99	Earl Monroe (27)	28–20
49	January 25	Boston	106–109	Walt Frazier (35)	29–20
50	January 28	@ Boston	116–122 (OT)	Lucas, Monroe (20)	29–21
51	January 29	Seattle	106–110	Walt Frazier (27)	30–21
52	February 1	Detroit	106–115	Bill Bradley (29)	31–21
53	February 2	@ Cincinnati	105–116	Bill Bradley (27)	31–22
54	February 4	@ Buffalo	103–84	Earl Monroe (21)	32–22
55	February 5	Philadelphia	104–112	Bill Bradley (30)	33–22
56	February 6	@ Philadelphia	109–107	Bill Bradley (28)	34–22
57	February 8	Los Angeles	107–102	Bill Bradley (26)	34–23
58	February 9	@ Detroit	126–102	Walt Frazier (31)	35–23
59	February 11	@ Milwaukee	113–107	Jerry Lucas (29)	36–23
60	February 12	Cleveland	91–106	Bill Bradley (23)	37–23
61	February 16	Houston	100–110	Walt Frazier (28)	38–23
62	February 17	@ Chicago	102–99 (OT)	Walt Frazier (22)	39–23
63	February 19	Buffalo	95–100	Jerry Lucas (22)	40–23
64	February 20	@ Cleveland	109–111	Dave DeBusschere (28)	40–24
65	February 22	Portland	105–122	Walt Frazier (29)	41–24
66	February 26	Baltimore	104–97	Walt Frazier (22)	41–25
67	February 27	N Baltimore	97–95 (OT)	Earl Monroe (21)	42–25
68	February 29	Los Angeles	114–111	Jerry Lucas (32)	42–26
69	March 3	@ Buffalo	97–105	Frazier, Lucas (19)	42–27
70	March 4	Philadelphia	115–118 (OT)	Jerry Lucas (28)	43–27
71	March 5	@ Philadelphia	98–100	Dave DeBusschere (24)	43–28
72	March 7	Milwaukee	101–110	Jerry Lucas (30)	44–28
73	March 11	Phoenix	110–106	Bill Bradley (30)	44–29
74	March 12	@ Boston	109–112	Phil Jackson (28)	44–30
75	March 14	Atlanta	107–115	Barnett, Frazier (22)	45–30
76	March 16	@ Houston	103–102	Bradley, Monroe (20)	46–30
77	March 17	@ Phoenix	106–111	Walt Frazier (25)	46–31
78	March 18	@ Portland	86–133	Frazier, Rackley (15)	46–32
79	March 22	Buffalo	99–123	Bill Bradley (33)	47–32
80	March 24	@ Milwaukee	88–131	Jackson, Monroe (12)	47–33
81	March 25	Cleveland	83–98	Walt Frazier (23)	48–33
82	March 26	@ Atlanta	106–120	Walt Frazier (27)	48–34

== Playoffs ==
1972 playoff game log
Conference semifinals: 4–2 (home: 3–0; road: 1–2)

Game	Date	Team	Score	High points	High rebounds	High assists	Location Attendance	Series
1	March 31	@ Baltimore	L 105–108 (OT)	Walt Frazier (31)	Jerry Lucas (14)	Walt Frazier (6)	Baltimore Civic Center; 12,289	0–1
2	April 2	Baltimore	W 110–88	Walt Frazier (30)	Dave DeBusschere (14)	Walt Frazier (9)	Madison Square Garden; 19,588	1–1
3	April 4	@ Baltimore	L 103–104	Earl Monroe (28)	Jerry Lucas (12)	Bill Bradley (5)	Baltimore Civic Center; 12,289	1–2
4	April 6	Baltimore	W 104–98	Bill Bradley (25)	Dave DeBusschere (13)	Walt Frazier (8)	Madison Square Garden; 19,588	2–2
5	April 9	@ Baltimore	W 106–82	Lucas, Monroe (20)	Jerry Lucas (16)	Jerry Lucas (6)	Baltimore Civic Center; 10,244	3–2
6	April 11	Baltimore	W 107–101	Lucas, Frazier (22)	Jerry Lucas (12)	Frazier, Monroe (5)	Madison Square Garden; 19,588	4–2

Conference finals: 4–1 (home: 2–0; road: 2–1)

Game	Date	Team	Score	High points	High rebounds	High assists	Location Attendance	Series
1	April 13	@ Boston	W 116–94	Walt Frazier (36)	Jerry Lucas (11)	Jerry Lucas (8)	Boston Garden; 14,292	1–0
2	April 16	Boston	W 106–105	Dave DeBusschere (24)	Dave DeBusschere (17)	three players tied (4)	Madison Square Garden; 19,588	2–0
3	April 19	@ Boston	L 109–115	Bill Bradley (29)	Dave DeBusschere (12)	Dave DeBusschere (6)	Boston Garden; 15,315	2–1
4	April 21	Boston	W 116–98	Earl Monroe (26)	Dave DeBusschere (16)	Jerry Lucas (7)	Madison Square Garden; 19,588	3–1
5	April 23	@ Boston	W 111–103	Dave DeBusschere (24)	Frazier, DeBusschere (11)	Walt Frazier (7)	Boston Garden; 15,315	4–1

NBA Finals: 1–4 (home: 0–2; road: 1–2)

Game	Date	Team	Score	High points	High rebounds	High assists	Location Attendance	Series
1	April 26	@ Los Angeles	W 114–92	Bill Bradley (29)	Dave DeBusschere (18)	Walt Frazier (11)	The Forum; 17,505	1–0
2	April 30	@ Los Angeles	L 92–106	Walt Frazier (21)	Lucas, Jackson (11)	Walt Frazier (7)	The Forum; 17,505	1–1
3	May 3	Los Angeles	L 96–107	Walt Frazier (25)	Jerry Lucas (14)	Jerry Lucas (6)	Madison Square Garden; 19,588	1–2
4	May 5	Los Angeles	L 111–116 (OT)	Bill Bradley (26)	Dave DeBusschere (13)	Jerry Lucas (11)	Madison Square Garden; 19,588	1–3
5	May 7	@ Los Angeles	L 100–114	Walt Frazier (31)	Dave DeBusschere (14)	Walt Frazier (10)	The Forum; 17,505	1–4

1972 schedule

== Awards and records ==
- Walt Frazier, All-NBA First Team
- Walt Frazier, NBA All-Defensive First Team
- Dave DeBusschere, NBA All-Defensive First Team

== Bibliography ==
- Araton, Harvey (2011). When the Garden Was Eden: Clyde, the Captain, Dollar Bill, and the Glory Days of the New York Knicks. New York City: HarperCollins. ISBN 978-0-06-195623-2.
