= 1971–72 Philadelphia 76ers season =

Season of National Basketball Association team the Philadelphia 76ers

- Head coach: Jack Ramsay
- Arena: The Spectrum

Results
- Record: 30–52 (.366)
- Place: Division: 3rd (Atlantic); Conference: 6th (Eastern)
- Playoff finish: Did not qualify
- Stats at Basketball Reference

Local media
- Television: WTAF-TV
- Radio: WCAU

The 1971–72 Philadelphia 76ers season was the 76ers 23rd season in the NBA and 9th season in Philadelphia. The team finished with a record of 30–52 and missed the post season for the 1st time in franchise history, ending an NBA-record streak of 22 consecutive appearances.

The team made a major trade to obtain guards Fred Carter and Kevin Loughery from the Baltimore Bullets in exchange for guard Archie Clark and draft picks. At the start of the season the team was 9–4 after 13 games but imploded before long.

After the season Billy Cunningham left for the ABA, Lucious Jackson retired due to nagging injuries & coach Jack Ramsay left to become the head coach of the Buffalo Braves.

== Offseason ==
=== Draft picks ===
This table only displays picks through the second round.

Round	Pick	Player	Position	Nationality	College
1	12	Dana Lewis	PF/C	United States	Tulsa
2	33	Marvin Stewart	G	United States	Nebraska

== Roster ==
Philadelphia 76ers roster
Players

Pos.	No.	Player	Height	Weight	DOB	From
C	20	Dennis Awtrey	6 ft 10 in (2.08 m)	235 lb (107 kg)		Santa Clara
F/C	23	Bill Bridges	6 ft 6 in (1.98 m)	228 lb (103 kg)		Kansas
G	3	Fred Carter	6 ft 3 in (1.91 m)	185 lb (84 kg)		Mount St. Mary's
F	32	Billy Cunningham	6 ft 6 in (1.98 m)	210 lb (95 kg)		North Carolina
G	15	Hal Greer	6 ft 2 in (1.88 m)	175 lb (79 kg)		Marshall
F	54	Luke Jackson	6 ft 9 in (2.06 m)	240 lb (109 kg)		Texas–Pan American

Coaches
Head coach
- Jack Ramsay

Legend
- (DP) Unsigned draft pick
- (FA) Free agent
- (S) Suspended
- Injured

== Regular season ==
=== Season standings ===
Atlantic Division	W	L	PCT	GB	Home	Road	Neutral	Div
y-Boston Celtics	56	26	.683	–	32–9	21–16	3–1	15–3
x-New York Knicks	48	34	.585	8	27–14	20–19	1–1	11–7
Philadelphia 76ers	30	52	.366	26	14–23	14–26	2–3	6–12
Buffalo Braves	22	60	.268	34	13–27	8–31	1–2	4–14

#	Eastern Conference			
#	Team	W	L	PCT
1	z-Boston Celtics	56	26	.683
2	y-Baltimore Bullets	38	44	.463
3	x-New York Knicks	48	34	.585
4	x-Atlanta Hawks	36	46	.439
5	Philadelphia 76ers	30	52	.366
5	Cincinnati Royals	30	52	.366
7	Cleveland Cavaliers	23	59	.280
8	Buffalo Braves	22	60	.268

z – clinched division title
y – clinched division title
x – clinched playoff spot

=== Game log ===
1971–72 Game log
#	Date	Opponent	Score	High points	Record
1	October 12	@ Chicago	114–100	Archie Clark (29)	1–0
2	October 14	@ Houston	105–94	Billy Cunningham (41)	2–0
3	October 16	@ Atlanta	104–102	Billy Cunningham (27)	3–0
4	October 20	Seattle	93–100	Billy Cunningham (29)	4–0
5	October 23	Milwaukee	110–88	Fred Foster (17)	4–1
6	October 24	@ Cleveland	111–93	Hal Greer (28)	5–1
7	October 27	Cleveland	106–120	Billy Cunningham (31)	6–1
8	October 29	Phoenix	137–135 (2OT)	Fred Foster (29)	6–2
9	October 30	@ New York	108–101	Kevin Loughery (25)	7–2
10	November 3	@ Cincinnati	100–124	Fred Foster (29)	7–3
11	November 6	Atlanta	96–101	Hal Greer (31)	8–3
12	November 10	Los Angeles	143–103	Greer, Wohl (16)	8–4
13	November 12	Detroit	101–115	Billy Cunningham (24)	9–4
14	November 13	@ Baltimore	105–111	Kevin Loughery (22)	9–5
15	November 14	N Milwaukee	114–125	Billy Cunningham (32)	9–6
16	November 17	Houston	118–112	Billy Cunningham (29)	9–7
17	November 19	Chicago	148–104	Billy Cunningham (17)	9–8
18	November 21	@ Seattle	117–127	Billy Cunningham (32)	9–9
19	November 23	@ Phoenix	107–128	Billy Cunningham (17)	9–10
20	November 24	@ Houston	108–109	Billy Cunningham (30)	9–11
21	November 25	@ Golden State	112–111	Fred Foster (28)	10–11
22	November 27	Portland	93–116	Billy Cunningham (23)	11–11
23	November 28	@ Cleveland	120–124	Bill Bridges (25)	11–12
24	December 1	Seattle	98–102	Billy Cunningham (32)	12–12
25	December 3	Los Angeles	131–116	Hal Greer (23)	12–13
26	December 4	@ Atlanta	109–126	Bob Rule (18)	12–14
27	December 8	@ Cincinnati	115–109	Bob Rule (21)	13–14
28	December 10	Cincinnati	113–106 (OT)	Kevin Loughery (27)	13–15
29	December 11	@ Detroit	118–111	Bill Bridges (26)	14–15
30	December 14	@ Buffalo	110–117	Billy Cunningham (29)	14–16
31	December 16	@ Golden State	93–113	Cunningham, Wohl (19)	14–17
32	December 17	@ Portland	126–127	Billy Cunningham (47)	14–18
33	December 19	@ Los Angeles	132–154	Bob Rule (33)	14–19
34	December 21	@ Phoenix	119–124	Bob Rule (26)	14–20
35	December 25	Baltimore	117–114	Billy Cunningham (29)	14–21
36	December 27	@ Buffalo	121–112	Billy Cunningham (26)	15–21
37	December 28	Boston	120–116	Billy Cunningham (24)	15–22
38	December 29	N Cleveland	102–103	Bob Rule (25)	15–23
39	December 31	@ Boston	119–131	Bob Rule (36)	15–24
40	January 2	@ Cleveland	148–119	Billy Cunningham (38)	16–24
41	January 4	@ Detroit	131–127	Billy Cunningham (39)	17–24
42	January 5	Chicago	139–107	Billy Cunningham (22)	17–25
43	January 7	New York	113–117	Billy Cunningham (25)	18–25
44	January 8	Phoenix	119–130	Billy Cunningham (31)	19–25
45	January 12	Buffalo	111–109	Bob Rule (24)	19–26
46	January 14	Los Angeles	135–121	Bob Rule (25)	19–27
47	January 15	@ Detroit	131–121	Bob Rule (25)	20–27
48	January 16	@ Atlanta	116–124	Billy Cunningham (45)	20–28
49	January 21	N Portland	122–136	Fred Carter (29)	21–28
50	January 22	Golden State	113–106	Fred Carter (27)	21–29
51	January 26	Cincinnati	102–113	Fred Carter (31)	22–29
52	January 28	Milwaukee	127–118	Billy Cunningham (39)	22–30
53	January 30	@ Boston	114–130	Billy Cunningham (41)	22–31
54	February 2	Buffalo	104–119	Fred Carter (23)	23–31
55	February 4	Detroit	118–113	Carter, Cunningham, Rule (21)	23–32
56	February 5	@ New York	104–112	Kevin Loughery (22)	23–33
57	February 6	New York	109–107	Fred Carter (36)	23–34
58	February 8	@ Phoenix	108–120	Kevin Loughery (17)	23–35
59	February 10	@ Golden State	112–121	Fred Foster (30)	23–36
60	February 11	@ Portland	106–110	Fred Carter (26)	23–37
61	February 14	Houston	130–116	Billy Cunningham (25)	23–38
62	February 16	Cleveland	116–126	Bob Rule (31)	24–38
63	February 18	@ Milwaukee	132–126	Fred Carter (41)	25–38
64	February 19	Baltimore	121–105	Billy Cunningham (23)	25–39
65	February 21	@ Baltimore	101–102	Foster, Rule (21)	25–40
66	February 22	@ Chicago	88–119	Carter, Foster (14)	25–41
67	February 25	N Atlanta	114–110	Fred Foster (26)	26–41
68	March 1	Buffalo	99–108	Bob Rule (20)	27–41
69	March 3	Milwaukee	94–81	Dave Wohl (17)	27–42
70	March 4	@ New York	115–118 (OT)	Fred Carter (34)	27–43
71	March 5	New York	98–100	Fred Foster (24)	28–43
72	March 7	@ Los Angeles	97–114	Fred Carter (20)	28–44
73	March 9	@ Seattle	128–123	Bridges, Carter (26)	29–44
74	March 12	@ Houston	112–121	Billy Cunningham (20)	29–45
75	March 14	@ Buffalo	105–108	Fred Carter (26)	29–46
76	March 15	Boston	120–115	Billy Cunningham (32)	29–47
77	March 17	N Boston	111–127	Billy Cunningham (24)	29–48
78	March 19	Seattle	100–115	Billy Cunningham (26)	30–48
79	March 21	Atlanta	117–111	Billy Cunningham (31)	30–49
80	March 22	@ Boston	106–113	Billy Cunningham (26)	30–50
81	March 24	Chicago	116–99	Billy Cunningham (25)	30–51
82	March 26	Golden State	116–115	Hal Greer (27)	30–52

== Awards and records ==
- Billy Cunningham, All-NBA Second Team
