= 1971–72 Boston Celtics season =

NBA basketball team season

- Division champions
- Head coach: Tom Heinsohn
- General manager: Red Auerbach
- Arena: Boston Garden

Results
- Record: 56–26 (.683)
- Place: Division: 1st (Atlantic); Conference: 1st (Eastern)
- Playoff finish: Conference finals (lost to Knicks 1–4)
- Stats at Basketball Reference

Local media
- Television: WSMW-TV
- Radio: WBZ

The 1971–72 Boston Celtics season was the Celtics' 26th season in the NBA. The Celtics qualified for the playoffs for the first time in 3 seasons, and won the Atlantic Division for the 1st time in franchise history. The Celtics had the fifth best team defensive rating and the fifth best team offensive rating in the NBA.

Tom Heinsohn, a Celtics legend as a player, led the club in his third season as head coach. The team made its first postseason without Bill Russell since 1956, and would advance to their first conference finals before falling to the eventual runners-up and rivals New York Knicks in a five-game series.

== Draft picks ==
Round	Pick	Player	Position	Nationality	College
1	10	Clarence Glover	SF	United States	Western Kentucky
2	28	Jim Rose	PG/SG	United States	Western Kentucky
3	44	Dave Robisch	C/PF	United States	Kansas
4	61	Randy Denton	C	United States	Duke
6	95	Thorpe Weber	F	United States	Vanderbilt
7	112	Skip Young	G	United States	Florida State
8	129	John Ribock	F	United States	South Carolina
9	145	Ray Greene	G	United States	California (Pennsylvania)
10	161	Dale Dover	G	United States	Harvard
11	161	Reggie Brooks	F	United States	Southern New Hampshire
12	189	John Dalton	G	United States	Suffolk
13	201	Leroy Chalk	F	United States	Nebraska

== Roster ==
Boston Celtics roster
Players

Pos.	No.	Player	Height	Weight	DOB	From
SG	12	Don Chaney	6 ft 5 in (1.96 m)	210 lb (95 kg)		Houston
F/C	18	Dave Cowens	6 ft 9 in (2.06 m)	230 lb (104 kg)		Florida State
C	29	Henry Finkel	7 ft 0 in (2.13 m)	240 lb (109 kg)		Dayton
G/F	17	John Havlicek	6 ft 5 in (1.96 m)	203 lb (92 kg)		Ohio State
F/C	11	Steve Kuberski	6 ft 8 in (2.03 m)	215 lb (98 kg)		Bradley
G	20	Rex Morgan	6 ft 5 in (1.96 m)	190 lb (86 kg)		Jacksonville
F	19	Don Nelson	6 ft 6 in (1.98 m)	210 lb (95 kg)		Iowa
C	33	Garfield Smith	6 ft 9 in (2.06 m)	235 lb (107 kg)		Eastern Kentucky
G	10	Jo Jo White	6 ft 3 in (1.91 m)	190 lb (86 kg)		Kansas
SF	16	Satch Sanders	6 ft 6 in (1.98 m)	210 lb (95 kg)		NYU
G	7	Art Williams	6 ft 1 in (1.85 m)	180 lb (82 kg)		Cal Poly Pomona

Coaches
Head coach
- Tom Heinsohn

Legend
- (DP) Unsigned draft pick
- (FA) Free agent
- (S) Suspended
- Injured

== Regular season ==
Atlantic Division	W	L	PCT	GB	Home	Road	Neutral	Div
y-Boston Celtics	56	26	.683	–	32–9	21–16	3–1	15–3
x-New York Knicks	48	34	.585	8	27–14	20–19	1–1	11–7
Philadelphia 76ers	30	52	.366	26	14–23	14–26	2–3	6–12
Buffalo Braves	22	60	.268	34	13–27	8–31	1–2	4–14

#	Eastern Conference			
#	Team	W	L	PCT
1	z-Boston Celtics	56	26	.683
2	y-Baltimore Bullets	38	44	.463
3	x-New York Knicks	48	34	.585
4	x-Atlanta Hawks	36	46	.439
5	Philadelphia 76ers	30	52	.366
5	Cincinnati Royals	30	52	.366
7	Cleveland Cavaliers	23	59	.280
8	Buffalo Braves	22	60	.268

z = clinched division title
y = clinched division title
x = clinched playoff spot

=== Game log ===
1971–72 game log
#	Date	Opponent	Score	High points	Record
1	October 15	Golden State	97–75	Jo Jo White (22)	0–1
2	October 19	Baltimore	114–134	Jo Jo White (26)	1–1
3	October 22	@ Atlanta	115–108	Jo Jo White (34)	2–1
4	October 23	@ Buffalo	103–98	John Havlicek (34)	3–1
5	October 25	Atlanta	116–136	Dave Cowens (27)	4–1
6	October 26	@ New York	101–106	Jo Jo White (29)	4–2
7	October 27	Houston	97–108	Jo Jo White (31)	5–2
8	October 29	Milwaukee	114–125	Dave Cowens (37)	6–2
9	November 5	Detroit	102–103	Jo Jo White (29)	7–2
10	November 6	Portland	109–124	John Havlicek (32)	8–2
11	November 8	N Cincinnati	109–120	Dave Cowens (30)	9–2
12	November 10	@ Houston	142–103	Dave Cowens (29)	10–2
13	November 12	@ Phoenix	119–128	John Havlicek (26)	10–3
14	November 13	@ Seattle	112–116	John Havlicek (30)	10–4
15	November 14	@ Los Angeles	115–128	Jo Jo White (36)	10–5
16	November 17	Phoenix	121–140	John Havlicek (32)	11–5
17	November 19	Cincinnati	110–106	John Havlicek (29)	11–6
18	November 20	@ Chicago	106–123	John Havlicek (30)	11–7
19	November 21	@ Cleveland	128–105	John Havlicek (36)	12–7
20	November 24	Buffalo	100–108	John Havlicek (33)	13–7
21	November 26	New York	104–89	John Havlicek (28)	13–8
22	November 27	N Baltimore	120–125	John Havlicek (29)	13–9
23	November 28	Atlanta	108–130	Jo Jo White (25)	14–9
24	December 1	Los Angeles	124–111	John Havlicek (36)	14–10
25	December 4	Houston	107–117	John Havlicek (38)	15–10
26	December 7	@ New York	105–97	Jo Jo White (26)	16–10
27	December 8	Cleveland	107–126	John Havlicek (28)	17–10
28	December 10	@ Milwaukee	104–120	John Havlicek (32)	17–11
29	December 11	Chicago	115–99	John Havlicek (24)	17–12
30	December 12	@ Cincinnati	96–83	John Havlicek (28)	18–12
31	December 14	@ Chicago	116–108	John Havlicek (35)	19–12
32	December 15	Seattle	100–112	Chaney, White (22)	20–12
33	December 17	@ Cleveland	115–109	John Havlicek (25)	21–12
34	December 18	Buffalo	91–124	John Havlicek (30)	22–12
35	December 22	N Milwaukee	98–104	John Havlicek (26)	23–12
36	December 25	@ Cincinnati	99–94	Jo Jo White (30)	24–12
37	December 27	Golden State	97–99	John Havlicek (28)	25–12
38	December 28	@ Philadelphia	120–116	John Havlicek (36)	26–12
39	December 31	Philadelphia	119–131	John Havlicek (30)	27–12
40	January 1	@ Phoenix	104–114	John Havlicek (24)	27–13
41	January 2	@ Los Angeles	113–122	Cowens, Havlicek (29)	27–14
42	January 5	@ Houston	113–105	Jo Jo White (30)	28–14
43	January 7	@ Portland	120–114	John Havlicek (37)	29–14
44	January 8	@ Golden State	106–128	John Havlicek (28)	29–15
45	January 9	@ Seattle	119–125	Jo Jo White (32)	29–16
46	January 12	Chicago	112–113	Jo Jo White (31)	30–16
47	January 14	Detroit	94–108	Dave Cowens (26)	31–16
48	January 15	@ Atlanta	122–106	John Havlicek (40)	32–16
49	January 21	Houston	105–110	Havlicek, White (28)	33–16
50	January 23	Portland	105–115	Dave Cowens (26)	34–16
51	January 25	@ New York	106–109	Jo Jo White (33)	34–17
52	January 26	Cleveland	112–108	John Havlicek (27)	34–18
53	January 28	New York	116–122 (OT)	John Havlicek (33)	35–18
54	January 29	@ Detroit	124–112	Don Chaney (29)	36–18
55	January 30	Philadelphia	114–130	John Havlicek (33)	37–18
56	February 1	@ Baltimore	115–108	Dave Cowens (32)	38–18
57	February 2	Chicago	100–124	John Havlicek (32)	39–18
58	February 4	Cincinnati	109–122	Cowens, Nelson, White (21)	40–18
59	February 6	Seattle	123–128	John Havlicek (42)	41–18
60	February 9	Buffalo	112–139	Jo Jo White (24)	42–18
61	February 11	Los Angeles	108–121	Don Nelson (24)	43–18
62	February 13	Milwaukee	117–109	Jo Jo White (31)	43–19
63	February 15	@ Portland	111–104	John Havlicek (31)	44–19
64	February 16	@ Seattle	112–113	Dave Cowens (29)	44–20
65	February 18	@ Phoenix	115–126	John Havlicek (27)	44–21
66	February 19	@ Golden State	111–115	Havlicek, White (26)	44–22
67	February 20	@ Los Angeles	113–132	John Havlicek (27)	44–23
68	February 22	Phoenix	103–114	John Havlicek (27)	45–23
69	February 23	@ Cleveland	113–111	John Havlicek (33)	46–23
70	February 25	@ Buffalo	117–115	John Havlicek (33)	47–23
71	March 1	Cleveland	105–115	John Havlicek (31)	48–23
72	March 3	@ Detroit	125–96	Dave Cowens (22)	49–23
73	March 5	Cincinnati	125–114	John Havlicek (29)	49–24
74	March 6	@ Milwaukee	127–132 (OT)	John Havlicek (34)	49–25
75	March 12	New York	109–112	John Havlicek (41)	50–25
76	March 14	Golden State	110–124	John Havlicek (38)	51–25
77	March 15	@ Philadelphia	120–115	John Havlicek (36)	52–25
78	March 17	N Philadelphia	111–127	John Havlicek (35)	53–25
79	March 19	Baltimore	125–112	John Havlicek (26)	53–26
80	March 22	Philadelphia	106–113	John Havlicek (21)	54–26
81	March 25	@ Buffalo	121–116	John Havlicek (31)	55–26
82	March 26	Detroit	120–133	John Havlicek (27)	56–26

== Playoffs ==
1972 playoff game log
Conference semifinals: 4–2 (home: 3–0; road: 1–2)

Game	Date	Team	Score	High points	High rebounds	High assists	Location Attendance	Series
1	March 29	Atlanta	W 126–108	John Havlicek (32)	Dave Cowens (16)	John Havlicek (10)	Boston Garden; 12,815	1–0
2	March 31	@ Atlanta	L 104–113	John Havlicek (43)	Dave Cowens (12)	John Havlicek (4)	Alexander Memorial Coliseum; 6,955	1–1
3	April 2	Atlanta	W 136–113	John Havlicek (31)	Cowens, Finkel (11)	Jo Jo White (11)	Boston Garden; 12,094	2–1
4	April 4	@ Atlanta	L 110–112	Jo Jo White (32)	Steve Kuberski (13)	John Havlicek (5)	Alexander Memorial Coliseum; 7,192	2–2
5	April 7	Atlanta	W 124–114	John Havlicek (27)	Dave Cowens (12)	John Havlicek (9)	Boston Garden; 15,315	3–2
6	April 9	@ Atlanta	W 127–118	Havlicek, Cowens (26)	Dave Cowens (20)	Jo Jo White (9)	Alexander Memorial Coliseum; 7,192	4–2

Conference finals: 1–4 (home: 1–2; road: 0–2)

Game	Date	Team	Score	High points	High rebounds	High assists	Location Attendance	Series
1	April 13	New York	L 94–116	Jo Jo White (19)	Dave Cowens (15)	Jo Jo White (5)	Boston Garden; 14,292	0–1
2	April 16	@ New York	L 105–106	John Havlicek (29)	Dave Cowens (18)	John Havlicek (6)	Madison Square Garden; 19,588	0–2
3	April 19	New York	W 115–109	Jo Jo White (29)	Dave Cowens (16)	John Havlicek (11)	Boston Garden; 15,315	1–2
4	April 21	@ New York	L 98–116	John Havlicek (27)	Havlicek, Nelson (9)	John Havlicek (6)	Madison Square Garden; 19,588	1–3
5	April 23	New York	L 103–111	John Havlicek (32)	Dave Cowens (15)	Jo Jo White (9)	Boston Garden; 15,315	1–4

1972 schedule

== Awards and records ==
- John Havlicek, All-NBA First Team
- John Havlicek, NBA All-Defensive First Team
- Don Chaney, NBA All-Defensive Second Team
