= 1971–72 Baltimore Bullets season =

NBA professional basketball team season

- Division champions
- Head coach: Gene Shue
- General manager: Jerry Sachs
- Owner: Abe Pollin
- Arena: Baltimore Civic Center

Results
- Record: 38–44 (.463)
- Place: Division: 1st (Central); Conference: 3rd (Eastern)
- Playoff finish: Conference semifinals (lost to Knicks 2–4)
- Stats at Basketball Reference

Local media
- Television: WDCA
- Radio: WFBR

The 1971–72 Baltimore Bullets season was their 11th season in the NBA and ninth season in the city of Baltimore. The Bullets would stun their fans and the entire league by trading Earl Monroe. The trade was done three games into the season and Monroe was sent to the rival New York Knicks. The Bullets received Dave Stallworth, Mike Riordan, and cash. The Bullets did not adjust well to not having Monroe as they finished the season with a 38–44 record. The losing record would still be good enough to win the Central Division. In the playoffs, the Bullets would face Monroe and the New York Knicks and be beaten by the Knicks in six games.

Notably, the team had rebranded their uniforms in the offseason that saw a curving line (blue-orange-blue for the white jersey, white-blue-white for the orange jersey) with a number on the player's right shoulder while the "Bullets" wordmark was placed on the shorts.

== Roster ==
1971–72 Baltimore Bullets roster
Players

Pos.	No.	Player	Height	Weight	DOB	From
G	45	Phil Chenier	6 ft 3 in (1.91 m)	180 lb (82 kg)		California
G	21	Archie Clark	6 ft 2 in (1.88 m)	175 lb (79 kg)		Minnesota
F	35	Terry Driscoll	6 ft 7 in (2.01 m)	215 lb (98 kg)		Boston College
F	25	Gus Johnson	6 ft 6 in (1.98 m)	230 lb (104 kg)		Idaho
F	13	Stan Love	6 ft 9 in (2.06 m)	215 lb (98 kg)		Oregon
F	24	Jack Marin	6 ft 6 in (1.98 m)	210 lb (95 kg)		Duke
PF	40	Dorie Murrey	6 ft 8 in (2.03 m)	229 lb (104 kg)		Detroit Mercy
G	33	Rich Rinaldi	6 ft 3 in (1.91 m)	195 lb (88 kg)		Saint Peter's
SG	6	Mike Riordan	6 ft 4 in (1.93 m)	200 lb (91 kg)		Providence
SF	9	Dave Stallworth	6 ft 7 in (2.01 m)	200 lb (91 kg)		Wichita State
PF	12	John Tresvant	6 ft 7 in (2.01 m)	215 lb (98 kg)		Seattle
F	41	Wes Unseld	6 ft 7 in (2.01 m)	245 lb (111 kg)		Louisville

Coaches
Head coach
- Gene Shue

Legend
- (DP) Unsigned draft pick
- (FA) Free agent
- (S) Suspended
- Injured

== Regular season ==
=== Season standings ===
Central Division	W	L	PCT	GB	Home	Road	Neutral	Div
y-Baltimore Bullets	38	44	.463	–	18–15	16–24	4–5	9–9
x-Atlanta Hawks	36	46	.439	2	22–19	13–26	1–1	9–9
Cincinnati Royals	30	52	.366	8	20–18	8–32	2–2	11–9
Cleveland Cavaliers	23	59	.280	15	13–28	8–30	2–1	9–11

#	Eastern Conference			
#	Team	W	L	PCT
1	z-Boston Celtics	56	26	.683
2	y-Baltimore Bullets	38	44	.463
3	x-New York Knicks	48	34	.585
4	x-Atlanta Hawks	36	46	.439
5	Philadelphia 76ers	30	52	.366
5	Cincinnati Royals	30	52	.366
7	Cleveland Cavaliers	23	59	.280
8	Buffalo Braves	22	60	.268

=== Game log ===
1971–72 game log
#	Date	Opponent	Score	High points	Record
1	October 15	@ Chicago	82–106	Jack Marin (20)	0–1
2	October 16	Golden State	93–108	Earl Monroe (27)	1–1
3	October 19	@ Boston	114–134	Earl Monroe (28)	1–2
4	October 22	New York	110–87	Jack Marin (23)	1–3
5	October 23	N Cleveland	109–101	Jack Marin (31)	1–4
6	October 26	@ Milwaukee	90–120	Archie Clark (18)	1–5
7	October 27	Detroit	98–128	Jack Marin (26)	2–5
8	October 29	@ Detroit	105–119	Jack Marin (25)	2–6
9	October 30	Phoenix	94–101	Archie Clark (32)	3–6
10	November 2	@ Golden State	91–106	Jack Marin (28)	3–7
11	November 5	@ Los Angeles	106–110	Jack Marin (30)	3–8
12	November 7	@ Houston	109–106	Jack Marin (42)	4–8
13	November 10	Chicago	125–106	Archie Clark (23)	4–9
14	November 13	Philadelphia	105–111	Archie Clark (27)	5–9
15	November 16	Houston	107–110	Phil Chenier (26)	6–9
16	November 17	@ Cincinnati	113–103	Jack Marin (24)	7–9
17	November 19	Buffalo	105–126	Jack Marin (24)	8–9
18	November 20	@ New York	114–125	Archie Clark (27)	8–10
19	November 23	@ Cleveland	102–104	Archie Clark (30)	8–11
20	November 24	New York	114–94	Archie Clark (29)	8–12
21	November 26	@ Atlanta	118–105	Archie Clark (40)	9–12
22	November 27	N Boston	120–125	Jack Marin (37)	10–12
23	November 30	Cincinnati	118–103	Jack Marin (20)	10–13
24	December 2	N Buffalo	109–105	Marin, Stallworth (21)	10–14
25	December 3	Seattle	117–106	Archie Clark (37)	10–15
26	December 8	Portland	97–115	Archie Clark (30)	11–15
27	December 10	@ Chicago	102–118	Archie Clark (25)	11–16
28	December 11	Milwaukee	107–101	Jack Marin (25)	11–17
29	December 14	Cleveland	88–85	Archie Clark (24)	11–18
30	December 17	Atlanta	103–114	Jack Marin (31)	12–18
31	December 18	@ Atlanta	94–123	Archie Clark (18)	12–19
32	December 19	@ Milwaukee	96–111	Archie Clark (22)	12–20
33	December 22	Los Angeles	127–120	Archie Clark (35)	12–21
34	December 25	@ Philadelphia	117–114	Jack Marin (24)	13–21
35	December 26	@ Cleveland	102–108	Wes Unseld (22)	13–22
36	December 28	Cincinnati	87–119	Archie Clark (26)	14–22
37	December 30	@ New York	110–102	Jack Marin (33)	15–22
38	January 5	Detroit	89–111	Archie Clark (31)	16–22
39	January 7	@ Chicago	104–94	Archie Clark (32)	17–22
40	January 8	Atlanta	102–110	Jack Marin (29)	18–22
41	January 9	N Phoenix	103–109	Jack Marin (28)	19–22
42	January 11	@ Portland	106–114	Archie Clark (30)	19–23
43	January 13	@ Seattle	107–112	Clark, Marin (32)	19–24
44	January 15	@ Golden State	95–105	Archie Clark (26)	19–25
45	January 16	@ Phoenix	107–104	Archie Clark (32)	20–25
46	January 21	@ Detroit	102–107	Archie Clark (32)	20–26
47	January 22	N Portland	99–116	Archie Clark (24)	21–26
48	January 23	Cincinnati	101–132	Archie Clark (26)	22–26
49	January 26	Buffalo	114–115 (OT)	Jack Marin (31)	23–26
50	January 28	@ Cincinnati	132–124	Jack Marin (38)	24–26
51	January 30	N Milwaukee	116–112	Archie Clark (24)	24–27
52	February 1	Boston	115–108	Archie Clark (30)	24–28
53	February 4	Chicago	110–108	Archie Clark (23)	24–29
54	February 6	@ Los Angeles	127–151	Archie Clark (38)	24–30
55	February 8	@ Golden State	107–111	Clark, Chenier (24)	24–31
56	February 10	@ Phoenix	98–131	Jack Marin (24)	24–32
57	February 11	@ Houston	95–116	Jack Marin (20)	24–33
58	February 13	N Los Angeles	121–110	Phil Chenier (28)	24–34
59	February 15	Houston	98–113	Jack Marin (39)	25–34
60	February 16	@ Atlanta	103–105	Archie Clark (31)	25–35
61	February 18	Atlanta	81–106	Archie Clark (25)	26–35
62	February 19	@ Philadelphia	121–105	Jack Marin (27)	27–35
63	February 21	Philadelphia	101–102	Archie Clark (30)	28–35
64	February 22	@ Buffalo	98–99	Archie Clark (23)	28–36
65	February 23	Milwaukee	113–105	Archie Clark (23)	28–37
66	February 26	@ New York	104–97	Archie Clark (30)	29–37
67	February 27	N New York	97–95 (OT)	Archie Clark (23)	29–38
68	February 29	Seattle	118–117 (OT)	Archie Clark (32)	29–39
69	March 1	@ Phoenix	95–90	Jack Marin (23)	30–39
70	March 3	@ Portland	90–80	Archie Clark (24)	31–39
71	March 5	@ Los Angeles	108–94	Jack Marin (29)	32–39
72	March 7	@ Seattle	105–98	Mike Riordan (21)	33–39
73	March 12	N Detroit	97–102	Jack Marin (23)	34–39
74	March 14	Cleveland	127–118 (OT)	Archie Clark (31)	34–40
75	March 16	@ Cleveland	105–101	Archie Clark (24)	35–40
76	March 17	Seattle	107–112	Dave Stallworth (27)	36–40
77	March 19	@ Boston	125–112	Mike Riordan (30)	37–40
78	March 21	@ Buffalo	100–114	Riordan, Stallworth (18)	37–41
79	March 22	Golden State	121–101	Mike Riordan (15)	37–42
80	March 24	@ Cincinnati	114–132	Jack Marin (25)	37–43
81	March 25	Houston	106–85	Archie Clark (18)	37–44
82	March 26	Buffalo	101–119	Archie Clark (29)	38–44

== Playoffs ==
1972 playoff game log
Conference semifinals: 2–4 (home: 2–1; road: 0–3)

Game	Date	Team	Score	High points	High rebounds	High assists	Location Attendance	Series
1	March 31	New York	W 108–105 (OT)	Archie Clark (38)	Wes Unseld (18)	Wes Unseld (6)	Baltimore Civic Center; 12,289	1–0
2	April 2	@ New York	L 88–110	Archie Clark (18)	Unseld, Tresvant (10)	Archie Clark (7)	Madison Square Garden; 19,588	1–1
3	April 4	New York	W 104–103	Archie Clark (35)	Unseld, Tresvant (12)	Unseld, Clark (9)	Baltimore Civic Center; 12,289	2–1
4	April 6	@ New York	L 98–104	Archie Clark (22)	Wes Unseld (16)	Archie Clark (6)	Madison Square Garden; 19,588	2–2
5	April 9	New York	L 82–106	Mike Riordan (16)	Wes Unseld (13)	Archie Clark (9)	Baltimore Civic Center; 10,244	2–3
6	April 11	@ New York	L 101–107	Archie Clark (31)	John Tresvant (8)	Archie Clark (11)	Madison Square Garden; 19,588	2–4

1972 schedule

== Awards and honors ==
- Archie Clark, All-NBA Second Team
- Phil Chenier, NBA All-Rookie Team 1st Team
