= 1971–72 NBA season =

26th NBA season

- League: National Basketball Association
- Sport: Basketball
- Duration: October 12, 1971 – March 26, 1972; March 28 – April 23, 1972 (Playoffs); April 26 – May 7, 1972 (Finals)
- Games: 82
- Teams: 17
- TV partner: ABC

Draft
- Top draft pick: Austin Carr
- Picked by: Cleveland Cavaliers

Regular season
- Top seed: Los Angeles Lakers
- Season MVP: Kareem Abdul-Jabbar (Milwaukee)
- Top scorer: Kareem Abdul-Jabbar (Milwaukee)

Playoffs
- Eastern champions: New York Knicks
- Eastern runners-up: Boston Celtics
- Western champions: Los Angeles Lakers
- Western runners-up: Milwaukee Bucks

Finals
- Champions: Los Angeles Lakers
- Runners-up: New York Knicks
- Finals MVP: Wilt Chamberlain (L.A. Lakers)

NBA seasons
- ← 1970–71 1972–73 →

The 1971–72 NBA season was the 26th season of the National Basketball Association. The season ended with the Los Angeles Lakers winning the NBA championship, beating the New York Knicks 4 games to 1 in the NBA Finals.

As the 25th anniversary of the founding of the modern NBA, the league unveiled a new logo, inspired by the logo of Major League Baseball, to commemorate the occasion. It features the white silhouette of a basketball player dribbling, framed by red and blue. Jerry West of the Los Angeles Lakers was used as the model for the logo. Coincidentally, Jerry West would win the only NBA championship of his career during the season.

== Notable occurrences ==
- The San Diego Rockets relocated to Houston, Texas and became the Houston Rockets.
- The San Francisco Warriors were renamed the Golden State Warriors and the team moved across the San Francisco Bay to Oakland.
- The 1972 NBA All-Star Game was played at the Forum in Inglewood, California, with the West beating the East 112–110. To the delight of the home crowd, Jerry West of the Lakers won the game's MVP award, making a basket at the buzzer to win the game.
- The Lakers' 69 wins set a new record for most regular season wins in NBA history. This mark would stand for 24 seasons, until it was bettered by the 1995–96 Chicago Bulls.
- The Lakers' Elgin Baylor announced his retirement nine games into the season. That night, the Lakers began a winning streak that would last for two months, totaling 33 games. That streak still stands as the longest winning streak in the history of major American professional team sports.
- The current NBA logo, which features the silhouette of Jerry West, made its debut. The blue/red pattern was adopted from the Major League Baseball logo.
- This was the first season the Syracuse Nationals/Philadelphia 76ers did not make the playoffs.
- This was the last season of the Cincinnati Royals. The team would relocate in the offseason, splitting their home games between Kansas City and Omaha, and rename themselves the Kings.

Coaching changes
Offseason
Team	1970–71 coach	1971–72 coach
Los Angeles Lakers	Joe Mullaney	Bill Sharman
San Diego/Houston Rockets	Alex Hannum	Tex Winter
In-season
Team	Outgoing coach	Incoming coach
Buffalo Braves	Dolph Schayes	Johnny McCarthy
Detroit Pistons	Bill Van Breda Kolff; Terry Dischinger	Earl Lloyd

== Regular season ==
The Los Angeles Lakers came into the season returning a veteran squad from their playoff run a year before. Nine games into the season, aging and oft injured Elgin Baylor announced his retirement after 13 seasons. He was replaced at the starting small forward spot by Jim McMillian, who would go on to average 18 points per game, third best on the team. Despite Baylor's retirement, the Lakers went on a 33-game winning streak. The Lakers completed two undefeated months, going 14–0 in November and 16–0 in December. After winning their first three games in January, the Lakers lost 120–104 to the Milwaukee Bucks.

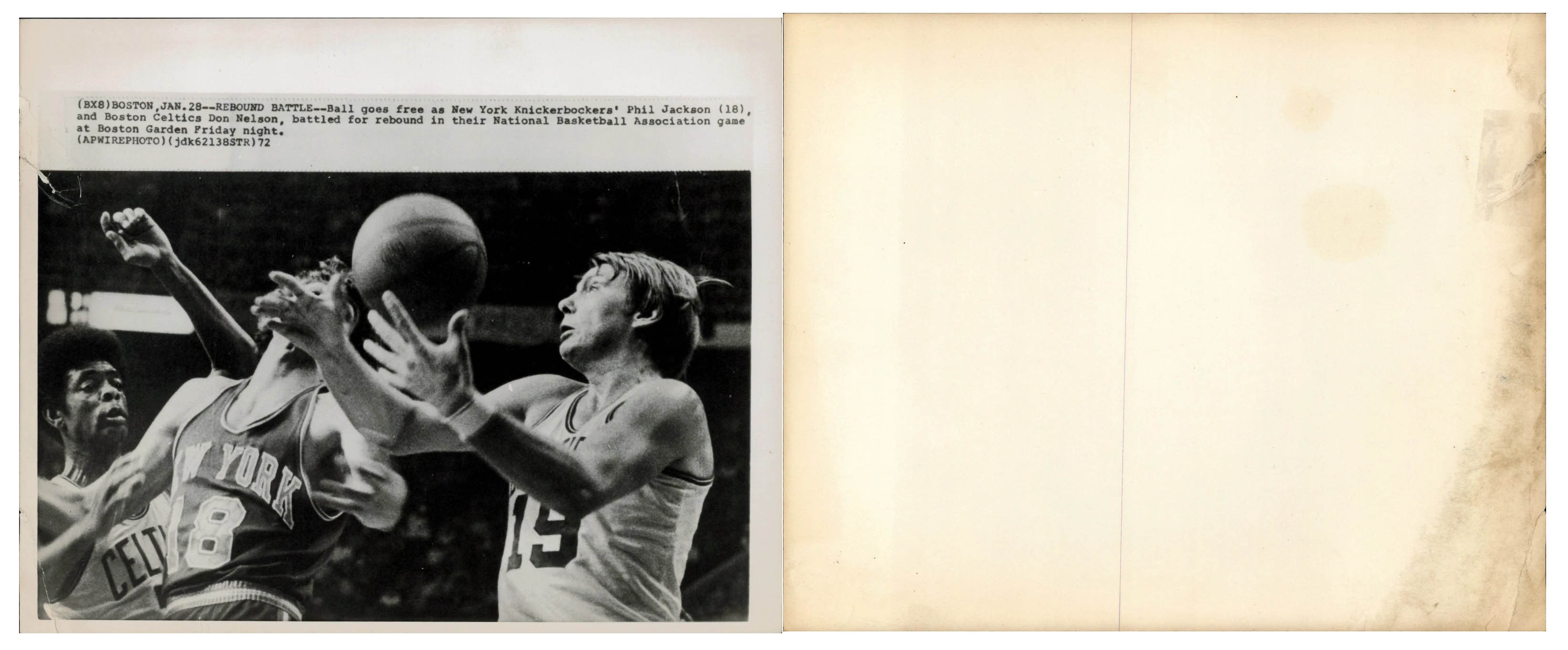
Phil Jackson (#18) battling Don Nelson (#19) for rebound in a Celtics vs Knicks game at Boston Garden

On March 20, 1972, the Lakers beat Golden State by a record 63 points (162–99), a mark that would stand until 1991, when Cleveland beat Miami by 68 points (148–80) and later was broken in 2021 when Memphis beat Oklahoma City by 73 points (152–79). The Lakers finished the season with a record 69 wins, which would stand until the 1995–96 season when the Chicago Bulls won 72 regular season games and later was also broken by the 2015–16 Golden State Warriors won an NBA record 73 regular season games.

The defending champion Milwaukee Bucks won 63 games on the play of renamed Kareem Abdul-Jabbar, formerly Lew Alcindor, and Oscar Robertson. The Celtics, led by second year center Dave Cowens, point guard Jo Jo White and 32-year-old swingman John Havlicek won the Atlantic Division with 56 wins. Boston had recovered from the retirement of Bill Russell, K. C. Jones and Sam Jones by winning 12 more games than the previous season.

== Playoffs ==
In the first round, the Lakers swept the Bulls and Milwaukee defeated Golden State. New York eliminated the Bullets and Boston won against the Atlanta Hawks. In the Western Conference Finals, the Lakers lost game 1 versus the defending champion Bucks at The Forum 93–72, a game that saw the Lakers score only 8 points in the third quarter. However, the Lakers led by assist champion Jerry West, leading scorer Gail Goodrich and veteran Wilt Chamberlain would win 4 of the next 5 games and beat Milwaukee in six games. In the Eastern Conference Finals, New York defeated the top-seed Celtics in five games.

In the NBA Finals, New York won game 1 very easily, but Los Angeles won game 2 106–92 to even the series. In game 3, the Lakers jumped out to a 22-point lead and regained home-court advantage with a 107–96 win. In game 4, the Knicks forced overtime. At the end of regulation, Wilt Chamberlain was called for his fifth foul. In his first 12 seasons, he had never fouled out of a game. Chamberlain did not foul out and led the Lakers to a 116–111 victory, but he broke his wrist in the overtime period. The Lakers held a 3–1 series lead going into game 5 in Los Angeles. In game 5, Chamberlain played despite his injury. The score was tied at 53 in the first half, but the Lakers outscored the Knicks 61–47 in the second half to win the game and the NBA championship, 114–100.

=== Notable trades ===
1971	To Baltimore Bullets Mike Riordan, Dave Stallworth, 1973 first-round pick, 1976 second-round and first-round picks	To New York Knicks Earl Monroe

== Final standings ==
=== By division ===
Atlantic Division	W	L	PCT	GB	Home	Road	Neutral	Div
y-Boston Celtics	56	26	.683	–	32–9	21–16	3–1	15–3
x-New York Knicks	48	34	.585	8	27–14	20–19	1–1	11–7
Philadelphia 76ers	30	52	.366	26	14–23	14–26	2–3	6–12
Buffalo Braves	22	60	.268	34	13–27	8–31	1–2	4–14

Central Division	W	L	PCT	GB	Home	Road	Neutral	Div
y-Baltimore Bullets	38	44	.463	–	18–15	16–24	4–5	9–9
x-Atlanta Hawks	36	46	.439	2	22–19	13–26	1–1	9–9
Cincinnati Royals	30	52	.366	8	20–18	8–32	2–2	11–9
Cleveland Cavaliers	23	59	.280	15	13–28	8–30	2–1	9–11

Midwest Division	W	L	PCT	GB	Home	Road	Neutral	Div
y-Milwaukee Bucks	63	19	.768	–	31–5	27–12	5–2	13–5
x-Chicago Bulls	57	25	.695	6	29–12	26–12	2–1	12–6
Phoenix Suns	49	33	.598	14	30–11	19–20	0–2	7–11
Detroit Pistons	26	56	.317	37	16–25	9–30	1–1	4–14

Pacific Division	W	L	PCT	GB	Home	Road	Neutral	Div
y-Los Angeles Lakers	69	13	.841	–	36–5	31–7	2–1	21–3
x-Golden State Warriors	51	31	.622	18	27–8	21–20	3–3	14–10
Seattle SuperSonics	47	35	.573	22	28–12	18–22	1–1	12–12
Houston Rockets	34	48	.415	35	15–20	14–23	5–5	9–15
Portland Trail Blazers	18	64	.220	51	14–26	4–35	0–3	4–20

=== By conference ===
#	Eastern Conference			
#	Team	W	L	PCT
1	z-Boston Celtics	56	26	.683
2	y-Baltimore Bullets	38	44	.463
3	x-New York Knicks	48	34	.585
4	x-Atlanta Hawks	36	46	.439
5	Philadelphia 76ers	30	52	.366
5	Cincinnati Royals	30	52	.366
7	Cleveland Cavaliers	23	59	.280
8	Buffalo Braves	22	60	.268

#	Western Conference			
#	Team	W	L	PCT
1	z-Los Angeles Lakers	69	13	.841
2	y-Milwaukee Bucks	63	19	.768
3	x-Chicago Bulls	57	25	.695
4	x-Golden State Warriors	51	31	.622
5	Phoenix Suns	49	33	.598
6	Seattle SuperSonics	47	35	.573
7	Houston Rockets	34	48	.415
8	Detroit Pistons	26	56	.317
9	Portland Trail Blazers	18	64	.220

Notes

- z, y – division champions
- x – clinched playoff spot

== Playoff bracket ==
Conference Semifinals
A1	Boston*	4
C2	Atlanta	2
Eastern Conference
C1	Baltimore*	2
A2	New York	4
M1	Milwaukee*	4
P2	Golden State	1
Western Conference
P1	Los Angeles*	4
M2	Chicago	0

Conference Finals
A1	Boston*	1
A2	New York	4
M1	Milwaukee*	2
P1	Los Angeles*	4

NBA Finals
A2	New York	1
P1	Los Angeles*	4

- * Division winner
- Bold Series winner
- Italic Team with home-court advantage

== Statistics leaders ==
Category	Player	Team	Stat
Points per game	Kareem Abdul-Jabbar	Milwaukee Bucks	34.8
Rebounds per game	Wilt Chamberlain	Los Angeles Lakers	19.2
Assists per game	Jerry West	Los Angeles Lakers	9.7
FG%	Wilt Chamberlain	Los Angeles Lakers	.649
FT%	Jack Marin	Baltimore Bullets	.894

== NBA awards ==
- Most Valuable Player: Kareem Abdul-Jabbar, Milwaukee Bucks
- Rookie of the Year: Sidney Wicks, Portland Trail Blazers
- Coach of the Year: Bill Sharman, Los Angeles Lakers
- All-NBA First Team:
  - F – Spencer Haywood, Seattle SuperSonics
  - F – John Havlicek, Boston Celtics
  - C – Kareem Abdul-Jabbar, Milwaukee Bucks
  - G – Jerry West, Los Angeles Lakers
  - G – Walt Frazier, New York Knicks
- All-NBA Second Team:
  - F – Billy Cunningham, Philadelphia 76ers
  - F – Bob Love, Chicago Bulls
  - C – Wilt Chamberlain, Los Angeles Lakers
  - G – Nate Archibald, Cincinnati Royals
  - G – Archie Clark, Baltimore Bullets
- All-NBA Rookie Team:
  - Sidney Wicks, Portland Trail Blazers
  - Clifford Ray, Chicago Bulls
  - Austin Carr, Cleveland Cavaliers
  - Elmore Smith, Buffalo Braves
  - Phil Chenier, Baltimore Bullets
- NBA All-Defensive First Team:
  - Dave DeBusschere, New York Knicks
  - John Havlicek, Boston Celtics
  - Wilt Chamberlain, Los Angeles Lakers
  - Jerry West, Los Angeles Lakers
  - Walt Frazier, New York Knicks (tie)
  - Jerry Sloan, Chicago Bulls (tie)
- NBA All-Defensive Second Team:
  - Paul Silas, Phoenix Suns
  - Bob Love, Chicago Bulls
  - Nate Thurmond, Golden State Warriors
  - Norm Van Lier, Chicago Bulls
  - Don Chaney, Boston Celtics

Note: All information on this page were obtained on the History section on NBA.com or Basketball reference.com

== See also ==
- 1972 NBA Finals
- 1972 NBA playoffs
- 1971–72 Los Angeles Lakers season
- 1971–72 ABA season
- List of NBA regular season records
