= 1971–72 Memphis Pros season =

ABA basketball team season

- Head coach: Babe McCarthy
- Owners: Memphis Area Sports, Inc. (until December 11, 1971); ABA (rest of the season)
- Arena: Mid-South Coliseum

Results
- Record: 26–58 (.310)
- Place: Division: 5th (ABA)

Local media
- Television: WMC 5
- Radio: WREC

The 1971–72 Memphis Pros season was the second and final season of the Pros in the American Basketball Association, as well as the fifth season of the franchise when including the previous seasons they played in New Orleans as the New Orleans Buccaneers. By the halfway point of the season, they were a below-average 17–25. In the second half of the season, they performed at an even worse 9–33, with a 10-game losing streak from February 4 to February 23 being the lowlight of the season. In fact, the team ended the season on a nine-game losing streak, with the Denver Rockets getting easy way to sneak into the 1972 ABA Playoffs for the final Western Division spot. The biggest winning streak they had was 3 games long, which they accomplished three different times throughout the season. The major catalyst for Memphis losing even more games then they already did was an ill-fated trade with the Carolina Cougars on January 3, 1972 that coach Babe McCarthy claimed was "the day they traded my ball club away" with the Pros trading away Wendell Ladner, Bob Warren, and rookie center Tom Owens for George Lehmann, Warren Davis, and rookie center Randy Denton in an attempt to win more games during the season; instead, Lehmann suffered a season-ending injury after only 15 games played for Memphis before sitting out the rest of the season, leading to the Pros playing worse than they previously were beforehand and later leading to coach Babe McCarthy leaving the team after being the oldest tenured ABA coach by this point in time to end up coaching the Dallas Chaparrals for close to an entire season. The Pros were tenth in points scored with 107.5 points per game and sixth in points allowed with 113.0 points per game. On December 11, 1971, the operation of the franchise was taken over by the ABA after the local Memphis Area Sports, Inc. ownership group (who took over the franchise from P.L. Blake the previous season) ran into their own monetary issues themselves (due in part to the way they were operating as a make-shift operation to save the franchise at the time). With the team struggling financially, to the point of considering the Memphis squad as the first team to actually fold in the ABA alongside both "The Floridians" and Pittsburgh Condors franchises (both of whom ended up folding themselves) after the season ended, the team was sold on June 13, 1972, to Charles O. Finley, who owned the MLB's Oakland Athletics and the NHL's California Golden Seals at the time of the sale. Soon after the sale was completed, they were rebranded as the Memphis Tams while still playing in the same arena as the Pros. However, their losing ways in Memphis would continue even with the new change in team names and ownership (as well as moving from the Western Division to the Eastern Division), with the rebranded Tams being the first ABA team to lose 60 games in a season since the Miami Floridians and later briefly holding the worst record in ABA history not long afterward.

== ABA Draft ==
This draft was the first ABA draft to have a properly recorded historical note of every round in their draft available.

| Round | Pick | Player | Position(s) | Nationality | College |
|---|---|---|---|---|---|
| 1 | 6 | Randy Denton | C | United States | Duke |
| 2 | 19 | Jake Ford | SG | United States | Western Kentucky |
| 3 | 29 | Thorpe Weber | F | United States | Vanderbilt |
| 4 | 36 | Tom Owens | PF/C | United States | South Carolina |
| 4 | 38 | Amos Thomas | SG/SF | United States | Southwestern State College |
| 5 | 49 | Kennedy McIntosh | PF | United States | Eastern Michigan |
| 6 | 60 | Fred Hilton | SG | United States | Grambling College |
| 7 | 71 | Loyd King | SG | United States | Virginia Tech |
| 8 | 82 | James Douglas | G | United States | Memphis State University |
| 9 | 93 | Henry Smith | F | United States | Missouri |
| 10 | 104 | Jim Gregory | F | United States | East Carolina |
| 11 | 115 | Danny Davis | F | United States | Henderson State College |
| 12 | 125 | Gary Reist | G | United States | Rice |
| 13 | 135 | Edward Hoskins | SF | United States | LeMoyne–Owen College |
| 14 | 144 | Ken Riley | F | United States | Middle Tennessee State |
| 15 | 153 | Rod Behrens | PF | United States | Samford |
| 16 | 162 | Don Johnson | F | United States | Tennessee |
| 17 | 170 | Haywood Hill | SG/SF | United States | Oral Roberts |
| 18 | 177 | Reggie Wood | F | United States | College of Steubenville |
| 19 | 183 | Billy Barnes | PF/C | United States | Southern State College |
| 20 | 188 | Allan Dalton | G | United States | Suffolk University |

The Memphis Pros would join the Denver Rockets as one of only two ABA teams to actually utilize all 20 rounds of this year's ABA draft, with both teams also having an extra draft pick in an early round for good measure (in Memphis' case, they'd acquire an extra fourth round pick to go with their own fourth round pick in this draft). The fourth round pick that the Pros would acquire at Pick #36 would come from a trade involving "The Floridians" franchise (who would later go defunct after their final season concluded here, despite them making it to the ABA Playoffs that year by comparison to the Pros) some time before the 1971 ABA draft began. Funnily enough, a trade that the Pros did during the season would involve them trading their fourth round pick they acquired from "The Floridians" franchise (Tom Owens) in order to acquire their first round pick (Randy Denton) back from the Carolina Cougars after Denton decided to sign up with the Cougars for the start of the season instead of the Pros. This draft period was also notable for Memphis acquiring local-born sophomore player Johnny Neumann from the University of Mississippi as an undrafted prospect; while Neumann started out promising enough like Julius Erving and George McGinnis for the Virginia Squires and Indiana Pacers respectively before him, Neumann's own immaturity issues would cause him to not have as much of a successful playing career as Erving or McGinnis had.

== Roster ==
1971–72 Memphis Pros roster
Players

| Pos. | No. | Player | Height | Weight | DOB | From |
|---|---|---|---|---|---|---|
| SG | | Larry Cannon | 6 ft 4 in (1.93 m) | 195 lb (88 kg) | April 12, 1947 | La Salle |
| PF | 34 | Lee Davis | 6 ft 8 in (2.03 m) | 235 lb (107 kg) | October 11, 1945 | North Carolina Central |
| PF | 35 | Warren Davis | 6 ft 6 in (1.98 m) | 212 lb (96 kg) | 1943-06-30 | North Carolina A&T |
| C | 32 | Randy Denton | 6 ft 10 in (2.08 m) | 240 lb (109 kg) | February 18, 1949 | Duke |
| C | 12 | Coby Dietrick | 6 ft 10 in (2.08 m) | 220 lb (100 kg) | July 23, 1948 | San José State |
| PG | 13 | Jerry Dover | 5 ft 7 in (1.70 m) | 155 lb (70 kg) | October 16, 1949 | LeMoyne–Owen |
| PF | 25 | Gerald Govan | 6 ft 10 in (2.08 m) | 220 lb (100 kg) | January 2, 1942 | Saint Mary of the Plains College |
| PF | 11 | Wil Jones | 6 ft 8 in (2.03 m) | 205 lb (93 kg) | February 27, 1947 | Albany State |
| SG | 23 | Loyd King | 6 ft 2 in (1.88 m) | 180 lb (82 kg) | May 29, 1949 | Virginia Tech |
| SF | 33 | Wendell Ladner | 6 ft 5 in (1.96 m) | 220 lb (100 kg) | 1948-10-06 | Southern Miss |
| SG | 21 | George Lehmann | 6 ft 0 in (1.83 m) | 180 lb (82 kg) | May 1, 1941 | Campbell |
| SG | 14 | Johnny Neumann | 6 ft 6 in (1.98 m) | 200 lb (91 kg) | September 11, 1951 | Mississippi |
| C | 24 | Tom Owens | 6 ft 10 in (2.08 m) | 215 lb (98 kg) | June 28, 1949 | South Carolina |
| PF | 22 | Don Sidle | 6 ft 8 in (2.03 m) | 215 lb (98 kg) | June 21, 1946 | Oklahoma |
| SG | 21 | Bob Warren | 6 ft 5 in (1.96 m) | 190 lb (86 kg) | July 17, 1946 | Vanderbilt |
| SF | | Elnardo Webster | 6 ft 5 in (1.96 m) | 190 lb (86 kg) | 1948-03-06 | Saint Peter's |
| PG | 10 | Charlie Williams | 6 ft 0 in (1.83 m) | 165 lb (75 kg) | September 5, 1943 | Seattle |

Coaches
Head coach
- Babe McCarthy

Legend
- (DP) Unsigned draft pick
- (FA) Free agent
- (S) Suspended
- Injured

Roster

== Final standings ==
=== Western Division ===
| Team | W | L | % | GB |
|---|---|---|---|---|
| Utah Stars | 60 | 24 | .714 | - |
| Indiana Pacers | 47 | 37 | .560 | 13 |
| Dallas Chaparrals | 42 | 42 | .500 | 18 |
| Denver Rockets | 34 | 50 | .405 | 26 |
| Memphis Pros | 26 | 58 | .310 | 34 |

== Awards and honors ==
1972 ABA All-Star Game selection (game played on January 29, 1972)

- Wil Jones
