= 1971–72 Carolina Cougars season =

ABA basketball team season

- Head coach: Tom Meschery
- Arena: Greensboro Coliseum; Charlotte Coliseum; Dorton Arena

Results
- Record: 35–49 (.417)
- Place: Division: 5th

The 1971–72 Carolina Cougars season was the third season of the Cougars in the ABA and fifth season of the franchise when including their two seasons played as the Houston Mavericks. The team was 14–28 after the first half of the season, with a six-game losing streak (the longest of the season) contributing to their poor start. They then went 21–21 (with two instances of three game winning streaks) in the second half, but they ultimately lost the final spot in the playoffs by one game to The Floridians franchise. The two teams had met up for their final match-up of the season on March 24 in Greensboro, with the Cougars having two games to play afterwards and The Floridians having four left, respectively. The Floridians ended up winning that game with a 116–115 overtime victory, making their record 35–45 and the Cougars record at 33–49, which made it all but assured that the Cougars were eliminated from playoff contention this season due to The Floridians clinching the playoff spot four days later with their 36th win against the worst team of the Western Division, the Memphis Pros (if they had lost all four of their games played, the two teams would have been tied at 35–49, which would've necessitated a one-game playoff match to determine the final playoff spot in the Eastern Division). The Cougars had missed the playoffs for the second straight year in a row, with The Floridians later folding operations as a franchise months after their elimination in the 1972 ABA Playoffs. The team was fifth in points scored at 114.8 per game, but tenth in points allowed at 118.1 per game. Following their season's end, the Cougars would replace head coach Tom Meschery with the debut of future Hall of Fame head coach (and former ABA All-Star MVP player) Larry Brown.

During the regular season, the Cougars played 19 games in Greensboro, 14 in Charlotte, 6 in Raleigh, 3 in Winston-Salem, and one at Fort Bragg.

== ABA Draft ==
This draft was the first ABA draft to have a properly recorded historical note of every round in their draft available.

Round	Pick	Player	Position(s)	Nationality	College
1	2	Elmore Smith	C	United States	Kentucky State College
2	13	Rich Yunkus	PF/C	United States	Georgia Tech
3	22	Gregg Northington	C	United States	Alabama State
3	30	Ted McClain	PG/SG	United States	Tennessee State
5	46	Luke Adams	F	United States	Lamar State College Tech
6	57	Ron Rippletoe	F	United States	David Lipscomb College
7	68	Ed Kemp	F	United States	Adams State College
8	79	Kenneth Davis	PG	United States	Georgetown College (Kentucky)
9	90	Dave Wohl	PG	United States	Pennsylvania
10	101	Ken Mayfield	SG	United States	Tuskegee Institute
11	112	Bobby McKenney	C	United States	Pepperdine
12	122	Craig Love	F	United States	Ohio
13	132	Bob Wenzel	G	United States	Rutgers
14	141	Ron Dorsey	SF	United States	Tennessee State
15	150	Hank Commodore	G	United States	Northwestern State College
16	159	Frank Lorthridge	PF/C	United States	Pan American College
17	167	Dan Fife	G	United States	Michigan
18	174	Cliff Harris	F	United States	Hardin–Simmons University
19	181	Steve Bilsky	PG	United States	Pennsylvania

Interestingly enough, despite the Cougars not having the #1 pick of the draft due to the Utah Stars making a trade with the Texas Chaparrals as they were known at the time the 1971 ABA draft first began, the Cougars would ultimately obtain the services of Western Kentucky University's Jim McDaniels (the official #1 pick of the ABA draft) all the same by getting the best deal for him out of anyone else involved with McDaniels' services at the time. McDaniels would later end up being named an ABA All-Star in his time with the Cougars. Not only that, but the Cougars would also be the only team with two third round draft picks (likely obtained by either a trade or multiple trades of some sort), though with the ordering of the third round teams being completely different from the other rounds during this draft year, it's unknown which team(s) Carolina might have traded with in order to obtain their third round selections this year.

=== ABA Special Circumstances Draft ===
Before the regular season began for the ABA, they would host a unique little draft held in Memphis, Tennessee (home of the Memphis Pros) called the "Special Circumstances Draft" that was done in response to the NBA implementing a new mini-draft of theirs for college undergraduate players called the "Hardship Draft" during the 1971 NBA draft period. Similar to the "Hardship Draft" in the NBA, only a select few teams would actually end up participating in this specific draft (in this case, the Carolina Cougars, Denver Rockets, and New York Nets). Unlike the "Hardship Draft" for the NBA (which saw five players get selected in that specific draft), however, the "Special Circumstances Draft" that the ABA held on September 10, 1971 (the same day as the NBA's own "Hardship Draft") had only three total players (all junior players while in college) get selected in this draft, with two players get selected in the second round and one player selected in the fourth round (meaning no first round or third round draft picks were made in that draft and the second round actually held the #1 pick in this particular draft). Because of the unusual formatting, the Denver Rockets would technically get the #1 pick in this specific draft, while the Cougars got the #2 pick (fittingly in the second round) with their only selection there.

Round	Pick	Player	Position(s)	Nationality	College
2	2	Phil Chenier	SG	United States	California

Phil Chenier would be the #2 pick of the "Special Circumstances Draft" and have success in both the NBA's "Hardship Draft" and ABA's "Special Circumstances Draft". Despite him being selected earlier in terms of pick numbers (being the #2 pick in the ABA as opposed to the #4 pick in the NBA for their respective drafts), Chenier would choose to play for the Baltimore Bullets (who would later become the Capital Bullets and then the Washington Bullets later in his career before being the Washington Wizards of the late 1990s) in the NBA over the Carolina Cougars in the ABA due in part to him being considered a first round talent by the NBA's standards. However, even though Chenier chose to play for the NBA instead of the ABA's Carolina Cougars, he would still get selected two more times by the ABA in later, equally gimmicky drafts: they would do with the Virginia Squires selecting him in 1973's "Senior Draft" despite him already playing in the NBA by this time and the New York Nets selecting him in 1974's "ABA Draft of NBA Players" in a failed attempt by the ABA to lure NBA players away from the rivaling league into their own. As such, Chenier would be one of the most selected players in NBA/ABA draft history.

== Roster ==
1971–72 Carolina Cougars roster
Players

Pos.	No.	Player	Height	Weight	DOB	From
SF	27	Joe Caldwell	6 ft 5 in (1.96 m)	195 lb (88 kg)	November 1, 1941	Arizona State
SF	13	Frank Card	6 ft 7 in (2.01 m)	195 lb (88 kg)	December 28, 1944	South Carolina State
SF		George Carter	6 ft 4 in (1.93 m)	210 lb (95 kg)	1944-01-10	St. Bonaventure
PF	32	Warren Davis	6 ft 6 in (1.98 m)	212 lb (96 kg)	1943-06-30	North Carolina A&T
C	54	Randy Denton	6 ft 10 in (2.08 m)	240 lb (109 kg)	February 18, 1949	Duke
F	4	Ron Dorsey	6 ft 4 in (1.93 m)	200 lb (91 kg)	October 10, 1948	Tennessee State
PF	35	Wayne Hightower	6 ft 8 in (2.03 m)	192 lb (87 kg)	January 14, 1940	Kansas
PF	13	Stew Johnson	6 ft 8 in (2.03 m)	220 lb (100 kg)	August 19, 1944	Murray State
SF	33	Wendell Ladner	6 ft 5 in (1.96 m)	220 lb (100 kg)	1948-10-06	Southern Miss
PG	21	George Lehmann	6 ft 0 in (1.83 m)	180 lb (82 kg)	May 1, 1941	Campbell
PG	23	Gene Littles	6 ft 0 in (1.83 m)	160 lb (73 kg)	June 29, 1943	High Point
PF	22	Ed Manning	6 ft 7 in (2.01 m)	210 lb (95 kg)	January 2, 1944	Jackson State
SG	24	Ted McClain	6 ft 1 in (1.85 m)	180 lb (82 kg)	August 30, 1946	Tennessee State
C	1	Jim McDaniels	6 ft 11 in (2.11 m)	228 lb (103 kg)	April 2, 1948	Western Kentucky
SG	44	Larry Miller	6 ft 4 in (1.93 m)	190 lb (86 kg)	1946-04-04	North Carolina
C	52	Tom Owens	6 ft 10 in (2.08 m)	215 lb (98 kg)	June 28, 1949	South Carolina
SF	33	George Stone	6 ft 7 in (2.01 m)	195 lb (88 kg)	February 9, 1946	Marshall
SG	11	Bob Verga	6 ft 1 in (1.85 m)	190 lb (86 kg)	September 7, 1945	Duke
SG	21	Bob Warren	6 ft 5 in (1.96 m)	190 lb (86 kg)	July 17, 1946	Vanderbilt

Coaches
Head coach
- Tom Meschery

Legend
- (DP) Unsigned draft pick
- (FA) Free agent
- (S) Suspended
- Injured

Roster

== Final standings ==
=== Eastern Division ===
Team	W	L	%	GB
Kentucky Colonels	68	16	.810	-
Virginia Squires	45	39	.536	23
New York Nets	44	40	.524	24
The Floridians	36	48	.429	32
Carolina Cougars	35	49	.417	33
Pittsburgh Condors	25	59	.298	43

== Awards, records, and honors ==
1972 ABA All-Star Game selection (game played on January 29, 1972)

- Jim McDaniels
