= 1972–73 Memphis Tams season =

ABA basketball team season

- Head coach: Bob Bass
- Owner: Charlie Finley
- Arena: Mid-South Coliseum

Results
- Record: 24–60 (.286)
- Place: Division: 5th (ABA)
- Radio: WREC

The 1972–73 Memphis Tams season was the first season of the Tams existing and third overall season of American Basketball Association basketball in Memphis, as well as the sixth overall season of play when including the three seasons of play while out in New Orleans as the New Orleans Buccaneers. After Memphis had two seasons as the Memphis Pros with middling profits under multiple different ownership groups in mind, Charles O. Finley bought the team on June 13, 1972. He then proceeded to rebrand the team into the image of his other teams that he had owned at the time (the Oakland Athletics in the MLB and the California Golden Seals in the NHL), changing the colors of the team to Kelly Green, California Gold, and Polar Bear White. The team's name was picked from an array of 20,000 postcards sent by fans, with the winner being given a $2,500 prize, which turned out to be Tams. The Tams name was meant to be an anagram to stand for the fans that resided in the states of Tennessee, Arkansas, and Mississippi, with a tam o'shanter hat being the main logo for the new team. In fact, during their first ever game on October 12, 1972, the entire team came out wearing the vaulted tam o'shanter hats in question. Finley also had a hand in the combinations of uniform colors worn, in part due to every top and trunk there being either green, gold, or white, with one notable combo being yellow tops with white trunks. For all of the flair the team had with their uniforms, however, it did not translate into success either on the court or for their attendance, which also quickly made Finley go dour on his purchase of the franchise. By December, Finley tried to have negotiations to move the team to St. Paul, Minnesota (which would have been the third team to go to the state of Minnesota had the plan succeeded), with Ron Franz being cut from the team before Christmas (claiming he had retired from play at the time before returning to play for the Dallas Chaparrals later in the season). The Tams were sixth in points scored at 111.5 per game but were least efficient in points allowed at 118.1 per game. They had two different instances of 10-game losing streaks, with the Tams going around a month between wins at one point, losing 15 straight games from February 25 to March 24. By the time their streak ended, they had already been eliminated from making the playoffs with the New York Nets acquiring the final playoff spot in question in the Eastern Division. By the end of the season, they were the first ABA team to lose 60 games in a season since the Miami Floridians back in 1969.

== ABA Draft ==
As of 2025, there has been no official draft records for the first five rounds of the 1972 ABA draft specifically, while every other round after that point has been properly recorded by basketball historians otherwise. Because of the strange dispersity of draft picks not being properly recorded this year after previously being fully recorded in the previous year's draft and the number of rounds potentially being off for even the players being selected this year, the recorded players selected in this year's draft will be marked with a ? for the pick number in particular (as well as certain round numbers, if necessary) in order to showcase the awkward display currently going on with the 1972 ABA draft year in particular (though what is known is that Memphis ended up forfeiting their original #2 pick of the draft due to the Pros signing Larry Cannon from the Denver Rockets sometime after the 1971 ABA draft, which resulted in the team's forfeiture of that selection (ironically, Memphis would also be victims of having an ABA signing a player of interest on their end with multi-time ABA All-Star Jimmy Jones signing a deal with the Utah Stars after that same draft, which caused Utah to lose their own first round pick as well)). However, if any changes come up to where a proper, official recording of the 1972 ABA draft gets released displaying both pick numbers and round numbers for where certain players got selected, please provide the updated (potential) draft ordering with a source confirming the round and pick numbers included here.

Round	Pick	Player	Position(s)	Nationality	College
2	8	David Brent	PF/C	United States	Jacksonville
2(?)	16(?)	Russ Lee	SG/SF	United States	Marshall
3(?)	18(?)	Jim Price	PG	United States	Louisville
4(?)	27(?)	Rusty Clair	PF/C	United States	Oregon
6	43(?)	Bob Ford	F	United States	Purdue
7	55(?)	Rowland Garrett	SF	United States	Florida State
8	65(?)	Sam Simmons	G	United States	Bradley
9	77(?)	Steve Davidson	F	United States	West Texas State University
10	87(?)	Jackie Young	G	United States	Rocky Mountain College
11	99(?)	Steve Turner	C	United States	Vanderbilt
12	109(?)	Henry Bacon	SG	United States	Louisville
13	121(?)	Rupert Breedlove	C	United States	Oglethorpe College
14	131(?)	Sam McCarney	F	United States	Oral Roberts
15	143(?)	Gene Mack	PG	United States	Iowa State
16	151(?)	Ken May	F	United States	Dayton
17	161(?)	Steve Schmidt	G	United States	South Alabama
18	168(?)	Terry Hankton	F	United States	Arkansas Polytechnic College

During the draft, whenever Memphis would get a chance to select players in a round, they would swap their round ordering with the soon-to-be-defunct Pittsburgh Condors franchise due to them being considered the two worst teams of the ABA by the time the draft began on March 2, 1972, with Memphis starting off not just round two, but also the other even-numbered rounds, whenever applicable. Also, this draft would become the last ABA draft where the Memphis franchise would draft players under the Memphis Pros name. Months after the 1972 ABA draft concluded, the new owner of the Memphis squad would change the team's name from the Pros to the Tams, around the time the 1972 ABA dispersal draft began.

=== ABA Dispersal Draft ===
Sometime after Charles O. Finley bought the Memphis Pros, the franchise would officially be renamed into the Memphis Tams. Not long after that, they would debut their new team name in what would become the ABA's first ever dispersal draft done on July 13, 1972. This dispersal draft would occur after it was found out by the ABA itself that neither "The Floridians" nor the Pittsburgh Condors would be able to continue operations either in their original locations or elsewhere in the U.S.A. (or even Canada in the case of "The Floridians"), with Memphis themselves avoiding the same fate as them this season due to their new ownership taking over this season. Unlike the main draft the ABA did during the months of March and April, this draft would last for only six rounds as a one day deal and would have the nine remaining inaugural ABA teams, including the recently renamed Tams, selecting players that were left over at the time from both "The Floridians" and Pittsburgh Condors franchises (including draft picks from both teams there) and obtain their player rights from there. Any players from either franchise that wouldn't be selected during this draft would be placed on waivers and enter free agency afterward. Interestingly, only 42 total players were selected by the nine remaining ABA teams at the time of the dispersal draft, meaning everyone else that was available from both teams was considered a free agent to the ABA not long afterward. Not only that, but the Tams would start out this draft with the #1 draft pick in the event, as well as become both one of four teams (alongside the Carolina Cougars, Dallas Chaparrals, and Denver Rockets) to have multiple first round draft picks and one of two teams alongside the Virginia Squires to utilize all six rounds of the dispersal draft at hand. With all that said, the following players were either Floridians or Condors players that the recently renamed Memphis Tams acquired during this dispersal draft.

Round	Pick	Player	Position(s)	Nationality	College	ABA Team
1	1	George Thompson	PG	United States	Marquette	Pittsburgh Condors
1	8	Ron Franz	SF	United States	Kansas	The Floridians
2	14	Dave Lattin	PF/C	United States	UTEP	Pittsburgh Condors
3	22	Sam Cash	PF	United States	UC Riverside	The Floridians
4	31	Ron Thomas	PF	United States	Louisville	The Floridians
5	38	Charles Edge	SF	United States	LeMoyne–Owen College	Pittsburgh Condors
6	41	Ray Golson	G	United States	West Texas State University	The Floridians

The Memphis Tams would have the most overall picks of the draft with seven total selections made in six rounds of the draft. For the first overall pick of this draft, George Thompson, was previously an ABA All-Star for the Pittsburgh Condors during the last season of his three years he played with the Pittsburgh Pipers/Condors franchise; Thompson would later gain two more ABA All-Star appearances while with the Tams before leaving them in 1974 to play for the Milwaukee Bucks in the rivaling NBA and then leaving for international play not long afterward. As for their second first round pick, Ron Franz would briefly play for the Tams before "retiring" from play on December 1972 before returning to play for the Dallas Chaparrals in 1973 before later playing international basketball as well. Their second round pick, Dave Lattin, would especially be notable for being a part of the first all-black starting line-up for an NCAA championship squad through the Naismith Basketball Hall of Fame worthy 1965–66 Texas Western Miners men's basketball team, though he'd also play his final season with the Tams before retiring in 1973. Their third round pick, Sam Cash, would only play in seven total games for the Tams in his rookie season before later retiring from play in 1973. As for their fourth round pick, despite Ron Thomas being drafted by the Tams after acquiring his player rights from "The Floridians" franchise in this draft, Thomas would instead sign up with the Kentucky Colonels for this season and play with them all the way up until the ABA-NBA merger officially happened in 1976, including the Colonels' only ABA championship in 1975. For their fifth pick, Charles Edge decided to return to LeMoyne–Owen College for his senior year of college before later playing for the Tams for one season and then the Indiana Pacers for another season before retiring from play in 1975. Finally, their last pick in the draft, Ray Golson, would be the only selection from this draft to not play anywhere in either the ABA or rivaling NBA at all whatsoever.

== Roster ==
1972–73 Memphis Tams roster
Players

Pos.	No.	Player	Height	Weight	DOB	From
SG		Darel Carrier	6 ft 3 in (1.91 m)	185 lb (84 kg)	October 26, 1940	Western Kentucky
PF	40	Sam Cash	6 ft 8 in (2.03 m)	230 lb (104 kg)	November 13, 1950	UC Riverside
SF		Bill Chamberlain	6 ft 6 in (1.98 m)	188 lb (85 kg)	December 16, 1949	North Carolina
PF	34	Lee Davis	6 ft 8 in (2.03 m)	235 lb (107 kg)	October 11, 1945	North Carolina Central
SG	20	Mike Davis	6 ft 3 in (1.91 m)	183 lb (83 kg)	July 26, 1946	Virginia Union
PF	35	Warren Davis	6 ft 6 in (1.98 m)	212 lb (96 kg)	1943-06-30	North Carolina A&T
C	32	Randy Denton	6 ft 10 in (2.08 m)	240 lb (109 kg)	February 18, 1949	Duke
SF	30	Bob Ford	6 ft 7 in (2.01 m)	228 lb (103 kg)	January 26, 1950	Purdue
SF	15	Ron Franz	6 ft 7 in (2.01 m)	205 lb (93 kg)	October 20, 1945	Kansas
PF	30	Les Hunter	6 ft 7 in (2.01 m)	210 lb (95 kg)	August 16, 1942	Loyola Chicago
PG	24	Mervin Jackson	6 ft 3 in (1.91 m)	175 lb (79 kg)	August 15, 1946	Utah
PF	11	Wil Jones	6 ft 8 in (2.03 m)	205 lb (93 kg)	February 27, 1947	Albany State
SG	20	Loyd King	6 ft 2 in (1.88 m)	180 lb (82 kg)	May 29, 1949	Virginia Tech
SF	33	Wendell Ladner	6 ft 5 in (1.96 m)	220 lb (100 kg)	1948-10-06	Southern Miss
PF	22	Dave Lattin	6 ft 6 in (1.98 m)	225 lb (102 kg)	December 23, 1943	UTEP
SG		George Lehmann	6 ft 0 in (1.83 m)	180 lb (82 kg)	May 1, 1941	Campbell
SG	14	Johnny Neumann	6 ft 6 in (1.98 m)	200 lb (91 kg)	September 11, 1951	Mississippi
C	12	Luther Rackley	6 ft 10 in (2.08 m)	228 lb (103 kg)	June 11, 1946	Xavier
PG	23	George Thompson	6 ft 2 in (1.88 m)	200 lb (91 kg)	November 29, 1947	Marquette
PG	10	Charlie Williams	6 ft 0 in (1.83 m)	165 lb (75 kg)	September 5, 1943	Seattle
SG	10	Isaiah Wilson	6 ft 2 in (1.88 m)	175 lb (79 kg)	May 31, 1948	Baltimore

Coaches
Head coach
- Bob Bass

Legend
- (DP) Unsigned draft pick
- (FA) Free agent
- (S) Suspended
- Injured

Roster

== Final standings ==
=== Eastern Division ===
Team	W	L	%	GB
Carolina Cougars	57	27	.679	-
Kentucky Colonels	56	28	.667	1
Virginia Squires	42	42	.500	15
New York Nets	30	54	.357	27
Memphis Tams	24	60	.286	33

== Awards and honors ==
1973 ABA All-Star Game selection (game played on February 6, 1973)

- George Thompson
