= 1971–72 The Floridians season =

Final American Basketball Association team season

- Head coach: Bob Bass
- Owner: James Edwin Doyle
- Arena: Miami Beach Convention Center; Curtis Hixon Hall; Bayfront Arena

Results
- Record: 36–48 (.429)
- Place: Division: 4th (Eastern)
- Playoff finish: Lost in Division Semifinals

The 1971–72 The Floridians season was the fourth and final season of American Basketball Association out in the state of Florida for the franchise, as well as the fifth and final season for the franchise as a whole when including their only season they played as the Minnesota Muskies. For this season, 34 home games were played in Miami, with the other home games being played in either Tampa or St. Petersburg, skipping out on Jacksonville and West Palm Beach this time around. The Floridians edged out the Carolina Cougars for the final playoff spot by one game, with their 116–115 overtime victory proving key to clinching the spot, as their record was 35–45 and the Cougars record was at 33–49, with the Floridians not only having two more games to play than the Cougars, but only needing to win once more to officially clinch, which they did four days later with a 118–107 win over the Memphis Pros. (If The Floridians had lost to Carolina, they would have had to play a one game playoff match to determine the final playoff spot instead had every other result remained the same by comparison.) The team's biggest winning streak all season was 4 games long, with their first half record being 19–23. They then went 17–25 in the second half of the season, with a season high six-game losing streak happening in that half. They finished eighth both in points scored at 112.8 per game and in points allowed at 114.3 per game. In the Eastern Division Semifinals, they were swept by the Virginia Squires, with Game 2 of that series match aired nationally on CBS. After their season ended, the team was ultimately disbanded due to attendance not improving within the state of Florida despite the owners trying everything they could have possibly thought of to appeal to the state. While the team was close to relocating to a different place a couple of times (notably out in Cincinnati, Ohio and then Omaha, Nebraska), they ultimately folded the franchise under the ABA's discretion before getting a deal to relocate the franchise become official on their ends. Pro basketball would not return to the Miami area until 1988 with the Miami Heat, who have worn throwback jerseys of the team on occasion as part of "Hardwood Classics Nights", doing so for the first time during the 2005–06 season. Another NBA team would be added in the state of Florida a year after the Heat were added with the Orlando Magic being created, with a third team temporarily being included in the state with the Toronto Raptors having home games played in Tampa due to the COVID-19 pandemic during the 2020–21 season.

== ABA Draft ==
This draft was the first ABA draft to have a properly recorded historical note of every round in their draft available.

Round	Pick	Player	Position(s)	Nationality	College
2	15	Willie Long	SF/PF	United States	New Mexico
4	36	Tom Owens	PF/C	United States	South Carolina
5	47	Rich Rinaldi	SG	United States	Saint Peter's College
6	58	Larry Holliday	G	United States	Oregon
7	69	Greg Starrick	G	United States	Southern Illinois
8	80	Tom Lee	F	United States	Arizona
9	91	Jim Haderlein	F	United States	Loyola University of Los Angeles
10	102	Doug Rex	F	United States	UC Santa Barbara
11	113	Gerald Lockett	F	United States	Arkansas AM&N College
12	123	Will Allen	SF	United States	Miami (Florida)
13	133	Jackie Ridgle	SG	United States	California
14	142	Pembrook Burrows	C	United States	Jacksonville
15	151	Ken May	F	United States	Dayton
16	160	Wayman Terrell	PF/C	United States	Oklahoma Baptist
17	168	Bill Drozdiak	F	United States	Oregon
18	175	Eddie Myers	C	United States	Arizona
19	182	Steve Sims	SG	United States	Pepperdine
20	187	Pat Biber	F	United States	Tampa

This draft would inadvertently be the penultimate draft that "The Floridians" would ever participate in as a franchise. The final draft they'd participate in would be done months before the 1972 ABA Dispersal Draft involving this franchise and the Pittsburgh Condors. During this specific draft, "The Floridians" would trade their first round pick to the Denver Rockets and their third round pick to a currently unknown team (though it could potentially have been the Kentucky Colonels due to them having a third round pick at the spot that "The Floridians" would have had it in, meaning "The Floridians" would be the only team to not have a third round pick in the 1971 ABA draft); outside of trading away those selections, "The Floridians" would use every single round of this draft otherwise.

== Roster ==
1971–72 The Floridians roster
Players

Pos.	No.	Player	Height	Weight	DOB	From
PF		Will Allen	6 ft 6 in (1.98 m)	230 lb (104 kg)	February 8, 1949	Miami (FL)
PG	21	Mack Calvin	6 ft 0 in (1.83 m)	165 lb (75 kg)	July 27, 1947	USC
PF		Rick Fisher	6 ft 5 in (1.96 m)	215 lb (98 kg)	October 27, 1948	Colorado State
SF	15	Ron Franz	6 ft 7 in (2.01 m)	205 lb (93 kg)	October 20, 1945	Kansas
C	51	Carl Fuller	6 ft 9 in (2.06 m)	225 lb (102 kg)	January 10, 1946	Bethune–Cookman
C	41	Ira Harge	6 ft 9 in (2.06 m)	225 lb (102 kg)	March 14, 1941	New Mexico
SG	15	Warren Jabali	6 ft 2 in (1.88 m)	200 lb (91 kg)	August 29, 1946	Wichita State
SG	32	Larry Jones	6 ft 2 in (1.88 m)	180 lb (82 kg)	September 22, 1942	Toledo
C	43	Manny Leaks	6 ft 8 in (2.03 m)	225 lb (102 kg)	November 27, 1945	Niagara
PF	30	Willie Long	6 ft 8 in (2.03 m)	225 lb (102 kg)	March 1, 1950	New Mexico
PF	43	Walt Piatkowski	6 ft 8 in (2.03 m)	220 lb (100 kg)	June 11, 1945	Bowling Green
C	51	Craig Raymond	6 ft 11 in (2.11 m)	235 lb (107 kg)	April 5, 1945	BYU
SF	31	Sam Robinson	6 ft 7 in (2.01 m)	190 lb (86 kg)	January 1, 1948	Long Beach State
SF	44	George Tinsley	6 ft 5 in (1.96 m)	205 lb (93 kg)	September 19, 1946	Kentucky Wesleyan
PF	12	Al Tucker	6 ft 8 in (2.03 m)	190 lb (86 kg)	February 24, 1943	Oklahoma Baptist
SF	17	Josiah Dowling	6 ft 7 in (2.01 m)	184 lb (83 kg)	May 20, 1945	Hampton
SG	20	Lonnie Wright	6 ft 2 in (1.88 m)	205 lb (93 kg)	January 23, 1945	Colorado State

Coaches
Head coach
- Bob Bass

Legend
- (DP) Unsigned draft pick
- (FA) Free agent
- (S) Suspended
- Injured

Roster

== Final standings ==
=== Eastern Division ===
Team	W	L	%	GB
Kentucky Colonels	68	16	.810	-
Virginia Squires	45	39	.536	23
New York Nets	44	40	.524	24
The Floridians	36	48	.429	32
Carolina Cougars	35	49	.417	33
Pittsburgh Condors	25	59	.298	43

== ABA Playoffs ==
1972 playoff game log
ABA Eastern Division Semifinals: 0–4 (home: 0–2; road: 0–2)

Game	Date	Team	Score	High points	High rebounds	High assists	Location Attendance	Series
1	March 31	@ Virginia	L 107–114	Long, Jabali (22)	Long, Jabali (17)	Warren Jabali (7)	Norfolk Scope; 3,770	0–1
2	April 1	@ Virginia	L 100–125	Willie Long (22)	Warren Jabali (13)	Long, Tucker, Calvin (3)	Hampton Coliseum; 2,921	0–2
3	April 4	Virginia	L 113–118	Mack Calvin (27)	Jabali, Raymond (12)	Jabali, Calvin (8)	Miami-Dade Junior College North; 2,965	0–3
4	April 6	Virginia	L 106–115	Mack Calvin (23)	Ron Franz (11)	Mack Calvin (10)	Miami-Dade Junior College North; 3,117	0–4

1972 schedule

== Awards and honors ==
1972 ABA All-Star Game selections (game played on January 29, 1972)

- Mack Calvin
- Warren Jabali

== ABA Dispersal Draft ==
On June 13, 1972, months after participating in and completing the 1972 ABA draft, it was announced by ABA commissioner Jack Dolph that both The Floridians and Pittsburgh Condors franchises would go defunct for the 1972–73 ABA season due to neither team finding a viable location to help ensure their survival beyond the season, especially due to rumblings regarding a future NBA-ABA merger looking to not include either team alongside the Memphis Pros (who would soon afterward rebrand themselves into the Memphis Tams in an attempt to regain sustainability in the ABA) due to them all being considered the weakest links of the ABA at the time. For The Floridians franchise, they would fold operations in what was considered to be a tax write-off by the ABA after failing to secure a relocation deal to Cincinnati and various plans involving cities like Montreal (which would have being outside of the United States of America region for the ABA), Albuquerque, San Diego (who ironically would host their own ABA franchise later that year in the San Diego Conquistadors expansion franchise), and Omaha (who was slated to be sold to Peter Swanson of Swanson Foods had the ABA allowed for the initial sale to go through) ultimately fell through for varying reasons. In the final ABA draft The Floridians ever participated in, they selected Dwight Davis from the University of Houston, Mike Stewart from Santa Clara University, Scott English from the University of Texas at El Paso, Greg Starrick from Southern Illinois University (once again), Charlie Thorpe from Belhaven College, Dutch-born center Swen Nater from UCLA, Ron Thomas from the University of Louisville, Ernie Fleming from Jacksonville University, Sam Cash from UC Riverside, Tracy Tripucka from Lafayette College, Jerry Brucks from the University of Wyoming, Bobby Jack from the University of Oklahoma, Greg Flaker from the University of Missouri, Ray Golson from West Texas State University, Willie Cherry from the University of Denver, Arnie Berman from Brown University, Fred DeVaughn from Westmont College, and Bob Zender from Kansas State University with their final draft picks. The ABA would host its first ever dispersal draft a month later on July 13 involving former Floridians and Condors players, with every remaining ABA team at that point in time taking at least one player that was on The Floridians at the time of the draft. The following Floridians players or drafted players would be selected in this order by the rest of the ABA teams in this draft period.

- Round 1, Pick 2: Warren Jabali (Denver Rockets)
- Round 1, Pick 6: Mack Calvin (Carolina Cougars)
- Round 1, Pick 7: Willie Long (Denver Rockets)
- Round 1, Pick 8: Ron Franz (Memphis Tams)
- Round 1, Pick 9: Swen Nater (Virginia Squires)
- Round 1, Pick 10: Larry Jones (Utah Stars)
- Round 1, Pick 13: Dwight Davis (Indiana Pacers)
- Round 2, Pick 2 (#15): Scott English (Denver Rockets)
- Round 2, Pick 3 (#16): Mike Stewart (Carolina Cougars)
- Round 2, Pick 7 (#20): Ernie Fleming (Kentucky Colonels)
- Round 2, Pick 8 (#21): Dwight Jones (Indiana Pacers)
- Round 3, Pick 1 (#22): Sam Cash (Memphis Tams)
- Round 3, Pick 2 (#23): Al Tucker (Denver Rockets)
- Round 3, Pick 4 (#25): Jerry Brucks (Dallas Chaparrals)
- Round 3, Pick 5 (#26): Craig Raymond (Virginia Squires)
- Round 3, Pick 7 (#28): Lonnie Wright (Kentucky Colonels)
- Round 3, Pick 8 (#29): George Tinsley (New York Nets)
- Round 3, Pick 9 (#30): Tracy Tripucka (Indiana Pacers)
- Round 4, Pick 1 (#31): Ron Thomas (Memphis Tams)
- Round 4, Pick 2 (#32): Greg Starrick (Carolina Cougars)
- Round 4, Pick 3 (#33): Bobby Jack (Dallas Chaparrals)
- Round 4, Pick 6 (#36): Greg Flaker (Kentucky Colonels)
- Round 5, Pick 2 (#39): Greg Lowery (Virginia Squires)
- Round 6, Pick 1 (#41): Ray Golson (Memphis Tams)
- Round 6, Pick 2 (#42): Al Davis (Virginia Squires)
