= 1968–69 Los Angeles Stars season =

- Head coach: Bill Sharman
- Owner: Jim Kirst
- Arena: Los Angeles Sports Arena

Results
- Record: 33–45 (.423)
- Place: Division: 5th (ABA)
- Playoff finish: Did not qualify

Local media
- Television: KTTV 11
- Radio: KBIG

The 1968–69 Los Angeles Stars season was the first season of the franchise in Los Angeles in the American Basketball Association (ABA) and second overall season of the team despite the new owner stating that the Stars were a new franchise completely separate from the old Anaheim Amigos franchise. The team had been bought by construction businessman Jim Kirst in the summer of 1968, and were subsequently moved to the city of Los Angeles, to play in Los Angeles Sports Arena, with a new head coach and a roster that dispatched most of the Amigos' old lineup from the previous year. On October 30, 1968, the Stars made their debut by playing against the New Orleans Buccaneers, losing 112–109 to a crowd of 3,700. The Stars ended up finishing 5th place in the Western Division, finishing 8 games behind the 4th place Dallas Chaparrals.

== Roster ==
1968–69 Los Angeles Stars roster
Players

Pos.	No.	Player	Height	Weight	DOB	From
F	32	Brian Brunkhorst	6 ft 6 in (1.98 m)	208 lb (94 kg)	June 12, 1945	Marquette
SG	20	Steve Chubin	6 ft 2 in (1.88 m)	200 lb (91 kg)	February 8, 1944	Rhode Island
PF	55	Warren Davis	6 ft 6 in (1.98 m)	212 lb (96 kg)	June 30, 1943	North Carolina A&T
C	35	Dennis Grey	6 ft 8 in (2.03 m)	215 lb (98 kg)	August 26, 1947	California Western University
F	42	Elvin Ivory	6 ft 8 in (2.03 m)	210 lb (95 kg)	July 2, 1948	Louisiana
PG	10	Mervin Jackson	6 ft 3 in (1.91 m)	175 lb (79 kg)	August 15, 1946	Utah
PG	20	Jim Jarvis	6 ft 1 in (1.85 m)	175 lb (79 kg)	March 3, 1943	Oregon State
C	50	Ed Johnson	6 ft 8 in (2.03 m)	205 lb (93 kg)	June 17, 1944	Tennessee State
SF	22	Edgar Lacey	6 ft 6 in (1.98 m)	190 lb (86 kg)	August 2, 1944	UCLA
PG	12	George Lehmann	6 ft 0 in (1.83 m)	180 lb (82 kg)	May 1, 1941	Campbell
SF	14	Jay Miller	6 ft 5 in (1.96 m)	205 lb (93 kg)	July 19, 1943	Notre Dame
SG	44	Larry Miller	6 ft 4 in (1.93 m)	190 lb (86 kg)	April 4, 1946	North Carolina
SF	33	George Stone	6 ft 7 in (2.01 m)	195 lb (88 kg)	February 9, 1946	Marshall
SF	40	Ben Warley	6 ft 5 in (1.96 m)	200 lb (91 kg)	September 4, 1936	Tennessee State
SG	21	Bob Warren	6 ft 5 in (1.96 m)	190 lb (86 kg)	July 17, 1946	Vanderbilt

Coaches
Head coach
- Bill Sharman
Assistant(s)
- Larry Creger

Legend
- (DP) Unsigned draft pick
- (FA) Free agent
- (S) Suspended
- Injured

Roster
Updated: April 17, 2025

== Final standings ==
=== Western Division ===
Team	W	L	PCT.	GB
Oakland Oaks C	60	18	.769	-
New Orleans Buccaneers	46	32	.590	14
Denver Rockets	44	34	.564	16
Dallas Chaparrals	41	37	.526	19
Los Angeles Stars	33	45	.423	27
Houston Mavericks	23	55	.295	37

C - ABA Champions

== Awards and honors ==
1969 ABA All-Star Game selections (game played on January 28, 1969)

- Warren Davis
- Mervin Jackson
