= 1969–70 Los Angeles Stars season =

- Head coach: Bill Sharman
- Arena: Los Angeles Sports Arena

Results
- Record: 43–41 (.512)
- Place: Division: 4th (ABA)
- Playoff finish: Lost in ABA Finals

The 1969–70 Los Angeles Stars season was the second and final season of the franchise in Los Angeles in the American Basketball Association (ABA). It was also technically their third season of play when including their inaugural season as the Anaheim Amigos in nearby Anaheim despite the new owners of the team stating the Stars franchise were a completely separate franchise from the old Amigos franchise. Originally, expectations for the Stars during the season were considered low for them to do anything at all since they had mostly retained the roster they had from the previous season into this season of theirs as well. In fact, by late February, being close to the ending point of the regular season, the team was 25-34 (9 games under .500) and felt likely to continue their miserable woes from their first two seasons of play. However, by April 1, thanks in part to the stunning play of All-Stars Warren Davis and Mervin Jackson alongside All-Rookie Team members Mack Calvin and undrafted player Willie Wise, they ended up with a 40–38 record, later stunning the New Orleans Buccaneers out of the playoff race altogether, with two 6 game winning streaks during that span. The Stars qualified for the fourth and final playoff spot in the Western Division by one game, with the last-place Buccaneers missing out on the 1970 ABA Playoffs in the Western Division despite them having an average 42-42 that season. The Stars soon went on a miracle Cinderella run, beating the Dallas Chaparrals and Denver Rockets in 6 and 5 games in the division semifinals and division finals respectively, in order to surprisingly advance themselves to the 1970 ABA Finals. However, their dreams of surprising everyone for the ABA championship ultimately ended there, as the Indiana Pacers would start their ABA dynasty this season (winning three ABA championships in four years) by beating them in 6 games. The Stars ended up playing some of their playoff games in both Anaheim and Long Beach due to no one expecting (or even booking days for them to play) the team to go as far as they did in the Playoffs. Originally, following the season's conclusion, owner Jim Kirst planned on moving the team to Albuquerque, New Mexico since he didn't expect them to continue their season for much longer than they already had done so. However, once the Stars had their near-upset Finals run, owner Jim Kirst had decided to cut his losses and sell the team to Colorado businessman Bill Daniels on March 5, 1970 (over a month before the playoffs) for $850,000, who moved the team to Salt Lake City, Utah over having a potential return to Anaheim, California (potentially with the Anaheim Amigos name returning as well), on June 11 to become the Utah Stars for the rest of their existence. In their next season, the Stars won the ABA Finals while completing their move out to the state of Utah.

== Roster ==
1969–70 Los Angeles Stars roster
Players

Pos.	No.	Player	Height	Weight	DOB	From
SG	40	Andrew Anderson	6 ft 2 in (1.88 m)	184 lb (83 kg)	1945-07-06	Canisius
PG	20	Mack Calvin	6 ft 0 in (1.83 m)	165 lb (75 kg)	1947-07-27	USC
PF	55	Warren Davis	6 ft 6 in (1.98 m)	212 lb (96 kg)	1943-06-30	North Carolina A&T
PF	35	Wayne Hightower	6 ft 8 in (2.03 m)	192 lb (87 kg)	1940-01-14	Kansas
SF	54	Simmie Hill	6 ft 7 in (2.01 m)	233 lb (106 kg)	1946-11-14	West Texas A&M
PG	10	Mervin Jackson	6 ft 3 in (1.91 m)	175 lb (79 kg)	1946-08-15	Utah
PG	12	George Lehmann	6 ft 0 in (1.83 m)	180 lb (82 kg)	1941-05-01	Campbell
C	14	Billy McGill	6 ft 9 in (2.06 m)	225 lb (102 kg)	1939-09-16	Utah
SG	44	Larry Miller	6 ft 4 in (1.93 m)	190 lb (86 kg)	1946-04-04	North Carolina
G/F	44	Mel Peterson	6 ft 4 in (1.93 m)	185 lb (84 kg)	1938-03-23	Wheaton (IL)
C	12, 54	Craig Raymond	6 ft 11 in (2.11 m)	235 lb (107 kg)	1945-04-05	BYU
PG	22	Les Selvage	6 ft 1 in (1.85 m)	175 lb (79 kg)	1943-03-07	Truman State
SF	33	George Stone	6 ft 7 in (2.01 m)	195 lb (88 kg)	1946-02-09	Marshall
SG	32	Bob Warlick	6 ft 5 in (1.96 m)	200 lb (91 kg)	1941-03-20	Pepperdine
SG	21	Bob Warren	6 ft 5 in (1.96 m)	190 lb (86 kg)	1946-07-17	Vanderbilt
PF	14	Trooper Washington	6 ft 7 in (2.01 m)	215 lb (98 kg)	1944-04-21	Cheyney
PF	42	Willie Wise	6 ft 5 in (1.96 m)	210 lb (95 kg)	1947-03-03	Drake
F/C	22, 55	Tom Workman	6 ft 7 in (2.01 m)	218 lb (99 kg)	1944-11-14	Seattle

Coaches
Head coach
- Bill Sharman
Assistant(s)
- Larry Creger

Legend
- (DP) Unsigned draft pick
- (FA) Free agent
- (S) Suspended
- Injured

Roster
Updated: January 31, 2025

== Final standings ==
=== Western Division ===
Western Division	W	L	PCT	GB
Denver Rockets *	51	33	.607	-
Dallas Chaparrals *	45	39	.536	6.0
Washington Caps *	44	40	.524	7.0
Los Angeles Stars *	43	41	.512	8.0
New Orleans Buccaneers	42	42	.500	9.0

Asterisk Denotes playoff berth

== ABA Playoffs ==
ABA Western Division Semifinals

Game	Date	Location	Score	Record	Attendance
1	April 17	Dallas	103–115	0–1	4,513
2	April 18	Dallas	129-121	1–1	4,764
3	April 20	Los Angeles	104–116	1–2	971
4	April 22	Los Angeles	144–138	2–2	2,921
5	April 24	Dallas	146–139	3–2	5,128
6	April 26	Los Angeles	124–123	4–2	2,083

Stars win series, 4–2

ABA Division Finals

Game	Date	Location	Score	Record	Attendance
1	April 30	Denver	113–123 (OT)	0–1	7,071
2	May 1	Denver	114–105	1–1	7,187
3	May 4	Los Angeles	119–113	2–1	4,468
4	May 5	Los Angeles	114–110	3–1	3,432
5	May 9	Denver	109–107	4–1	6,401

Stars win series, 4–1

ABA Finals

Game	Date	Location	Result	Record	Attendance
1	May 15	Indiana	93–109	0–1	7,881
2	May 17	Indiana	111–114	0–2	9,014
3	May 18	Los Angeles	109–106	1–2	5,780
4	May 19	Los Angeles	120–142	1–3	7,027
5	May 23	Indiana	117–113	2–3	10,548
6	May 25	Los Angeles	107–111	2–4	8,233

Stars lose series, 4–2
