= George Lehmann =

American basketball player (1941–2024)

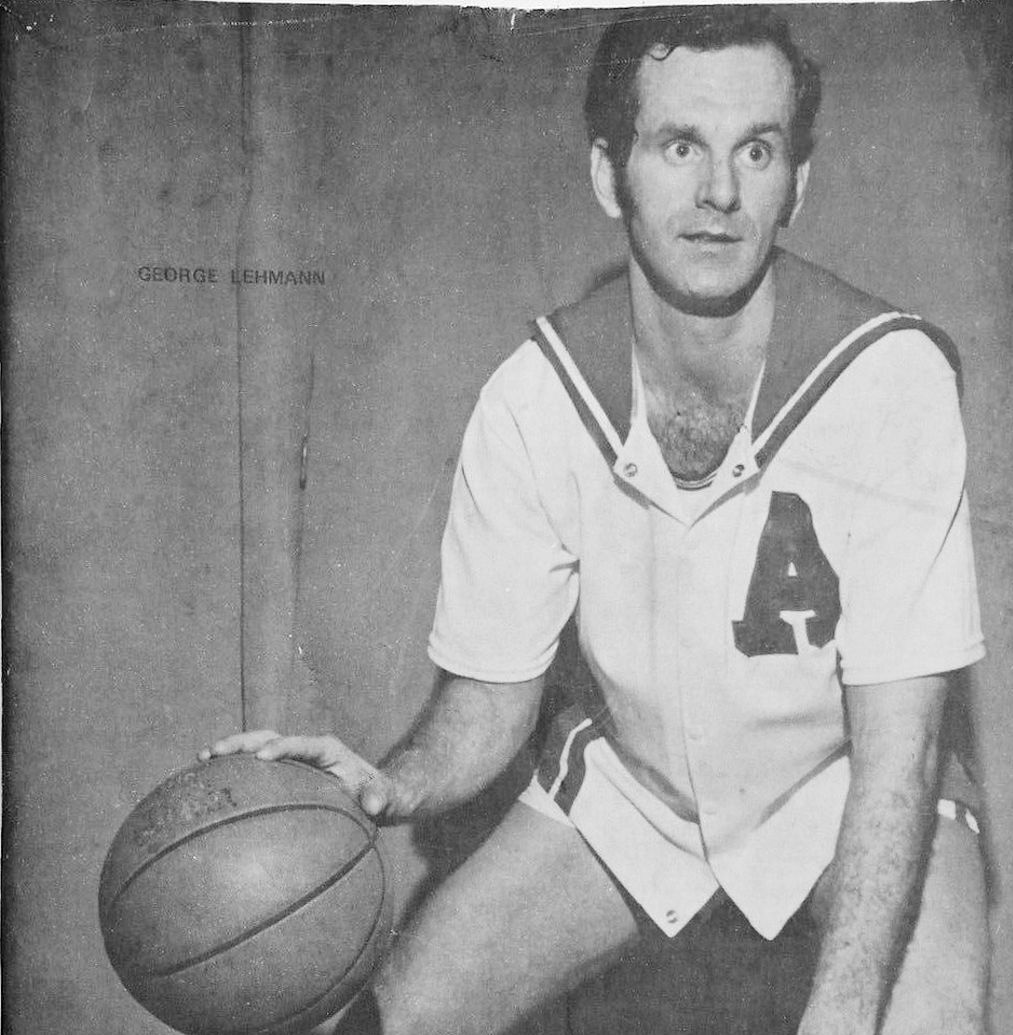
- Lehmann with the Allentown Jets in 1971

Personal information
- Born: May 1, 1941 Riverside Township, New Jersey, U.S.
- Died: November 8, 2024 (aged 83)
- Listed height: 6 ft 3 in (1.91 m)
- Listed weight: 180 lb (82 kg)

Career information
- High school: Camden Catholic (Camden, New Jersey)
- College: Campbell (1959–1960)
- NBA draft: 1963: undrafted
- Playing career: 1962–1974
- Position: Point guard / shooting guard
- Number: 20, 12, 32, 26, 21, 24

Career history
- 1962–1963: Sunbury Mercuries
- 1963–1964: Allentown Jets
- 1964–1967: Trenton Colonials
- 1967–1968: St. Louis / Atlanta Hawks
- 1968–1969: Los Angeles Stars
- 1969–1970: New York Nets
- 1970: Miami Floridians
- 1970–1972: Carolina Cougars
- 1972–1974: Memphis Pros / Tams

Career highlights
- All-EPBL Second Team (1967)
- Stats at NBA.com
- Stats at Basketball Reference

George A. Lehmann (May 1, 1941 – November 8, 2024) was an American professional basketball player.

Lehmann played only one year of high school basketball as a freshman. He played basketball at Campbell Junior College (now Campbell University) during the 1959–60 season and was third in the nation in scoring amongst junior college players. He transferred to Wake Forest University and played on the freshman team during the 1960–61 season. In April 1961, Lehmann was expelled by Wake Forest for an honor code violation.

Lehmann started his professional career in the Eastern Professional Basketball League (EPBL) with the Sunbury Mercuries during the 1962–63 season. He was invited to training camp by the St. Louis Hawks in 1963 but declined to move because his family lived in Camden, New Jersey. Lehmann was purchased by the Allentown Jets five games into the 1963–64 season. He was traded to the Trenton Colonials in 1964, and then spent the following three seasons with the team. Lehmann was selected to the All-EPBL Second Team in 1967.

Lehmann played in the NBA and ABA from 1967 to 1974 as a member of the St. Louis/Atlanta Hawks, Los Angeles Stars, New York Nets, Miami Floridians, Carolina Cougars, Memphis Pros, and Memphis Tams. He averaged 11.9 points per game and 4.5 assists per game in his professional career and holds the ABA's third best career three-point field goal percentage (.365). Lehmann was the first professional basketball player to make more than 40% of his three-point attempts in a season, which he did in 1970–71.

After retiring as a player, Lehmann hosted basketball clinics, worked for Pony Shoes, and owned a T-shirt business. His children, Nicole and Todd, played college basketball at North Carolina State University and Drexel University, respectively.

Lehmann died on November 8, 2024, at the age of 83.

== Career statistics ==
Legend
GP	Games played	GS	Games started	MPG	Minutes per game
FG%	Field goal percentage	3P%	3-point field goal percentage	FT%	Free throw percentage
RPG	Rebounds per game	APG	Assists per game	SPG	Steals per game
BPG	Blocks per game	PPG	Points per game	**Bold**	Career high
*	Led the league

=== NBA ===
==== Regular season ====
Year	Team	GP	MPG	FG%	3P%	FT%	RPG	APG	SPG	BPG	PPG
1967–68	St. Louis	55	9.0	.343		.814	.8	1.7			2.8
1968–69	Atlanta	11	12.5	.388		.667	.8	2.5			5.5
1968–69	L.A. Stars (ABA)	32	29.3	.415	.350	.805	2.3	5.0			**18.9**
1969–70	L.A. Stars (ABA)	10	23.7	.295	.250	.917	1.2	2.8			11.6
1969–70	N.Y. Nets (ABA)	46	14.8	.370	.325	.862	.8	2.3			7.5
1969–70	Miami (ABA)	25	**43.1**	.405	.329	.815	**2.8**	5.0			17.9
1970–71	Carolina (ABA)	**83**	35.2	.451	**.403***	.836	2.4	5.6			17.3
1971–72	Carolina (ABA)	38	36.8	**.499**	.392	.897	1.9	**7.8**			16.0
1971–72	Memphis (ABA)	15	34.8	.375	.297	.839	1.8	7.7			15.8
1972–73	Memphis (ABA)	28	26.9	.396	.388	.824	1.2	5.4			9.9
1973–74	Memphis (ABA)	33	16.8	.384	.360	**.947**	1.1	3.5	.4	.1	5.2
Career (NBA)		66	9.6	.356		.782	.8	1.8			3.2
Career (ABA)		310	29.3	.422	.365	.845	1.8	5.0	.4	.1	13.7
Career (overall)		376	25.8	.418	.365	.841	1.6	4.5	.4	.1	11.9

==== Playoffs ====
Year	Team	GP	MPG	FG%	FT%	RPG	APG	PPG
1968	St. Louis	1	2.0	.000	–	.0	2.0	.0
