= Wil Jones (basketball, born 1947) =

American basketball player (born 1947)

Personal information
- Born: February 27, 1947 (age 79) McGehee, Arkansas, U.S.
- Listed height: 6 ft 8 in (2.03 m)
- Listed weight: 205 lb (93 kg)

Career information
- High school: Desha Central (Rohwer, Arkansas)
- College: Albany State (1966–1969)
- NBA draft: 1969: 5th round, 69th overall pick
- Drafted by: Los Angeles Lakers
- Playing career: 1969–1978
- Position: Power forward
- Number: 14, 11, 22, 24

Career history
- 1969–1970: Miami Floridians
- 1970–1974: Memphis Pros / Tams
- 1974–1976: Kentucky Colonels
- 1976–1977: Indiana Pacers
- 1977–1978: Buffalo Braves

Career highlights
- ABA champion (1975); ABA All-Star (1972); ABA All-Defensive First Team (1975)

Career ABA and NBA statistics
- Points: 8,482 (11.7 ppg)
- Rebounds: 5,560 (7.7 rpg)
- Assists: 1,446 (2.0 apg)
- Stats at NBA.com
- Stats at Basketball Reference

Wilbert Jones (born February 27, 1947) is an American former professional basketball player. He played college basketball for the Albany State Golden Rams.

== Career ==
A 6'8" forward born in McGehee, Arkansas, and played college basketball at Albany State University, he was named a Little All-American by UPI for the 1968–69 season, as the Golden Rams won their third consecutive Southeastern Athletic Conference regular season title. Jones was drafted in the fifth round of the 1969 NBA draft by the Los Angeles Lakers and by the Miami Floridians in the 1969 ABA Draft.

Jones played seven seasons (1969–1976) in the American Basketball Association as a member of the Miami Floridians, Memphis Pros/Tams and Kentucky Colonels.

After the ABA–NBA merger in 1976 Jones was selected by the Indiana Pacers in the ABA dispersal draft and played two seasons (1976–1978) in the National Basketball Association for the Indiana Pacers and Buffalo Braves.

Jones won the 1975 ABA Championship with the 1974–75 Kentucky Colonels, and was named to the 1975 ABA All-Defense Team. In his ABA/NBA career, he tallied 8,482 total points, 5,560 total rebounds and 1,446 total assists.

His brothers Caldwell Jones, Charles Jones and Major Jones all played in the NBA.

== Career statistics ==
Legend
GP	Games played	GS	Games started	MPG	Minutes per game
FG%	Field goal percentage	3P%	3-point field goal percentage	FT%	Free throw percentage
RPG	Rebounds per game	APG	Assists per game	SPG	Steals per game
BPG	Blocks per game	PPG	Points per game	**Bold**	Career high
*	Led the league

†	Denotes seasons in which Williams's team won an ABA championship

=== ABA/NBA ===
==== Regular season ====
Year	Team	GP	GS	MPG	FG%	3P%	FT%	RPG	APG	SPG	BPG	PPG
1969–70	Miami (ABA)	74		22.9	.394	.182	.728	7.6	.6			8.2
1970–71	Memphis (ABA)	**84**		26.6	.481	.077	.674	8.1	1.8			11.4
1971–72	Memphis (ABA)	**84**		**36.9**	.469	.125	.750	**10.4**	1.8			**14.9**
1972–73	Memphis (ABA)	76		30.5	.476	.143	.737	7.9	1.5			11.0
1973–74	Memphis (ABA)	81		35.1	.454	.115	.741	8.2	2.5	**1.3**	**1.0**	13.2
1974–75†	Kentucky (ABA)	**84***		32.0	**.483**	.000	.735	7.2	**3.0**	**1.3**	.8	12.6
1975–76	Kentucky (ABA)	83		31.7	.476	**.500**	**.775**	7.5	2.5	1.0	.7	13.6
1976–77	Indiana	80	74	33.9	.430		.744	7.6	2.4	**1.3**	**1.0**	13.0
1977–78	Buffalo	79		21.7	.440		.706	4.2	1.5	.9	.5	6.8
Career (ABA)		566		30.9	.465	.143	.734	8.2	2.0	1.2	.8	12.2
Career (NBA)		159	74	27.8	.433		.731	5.9	1.9	1.1	.8	9.9
Career (overall)		725	74	30.2	.459	.143	.733	7.7	2.0	1.2	.8	11.7
All-Star		1		10.0	.333	–	–	3.0	.0	2.0		

==== Playoffs ====
Year	Team	GP	MPG	FG%	3P%	FT%	RPG	APG	SPG	BPG	PPG
1971	Memphis (ABA)	4	**39.5**	**.500**	–	.667	**12.3**	**3.3**			**15.0**
1975†	Kentucky (ABA)	**15**	30.3	.437	.000	.792	6.7	3.2	**1.1**	**.8**	9.5
1976	Kentucky (ABA)	10	32.4	.481	.000	**.941**	6.7	2.0	**1.1**	.0	12.0
Career		29	32.3	.464	.000	.830	7.4	2.5	1.1	.5	11.1
