= George Thompson (basketball) =

American basketball player (1947–2022)

Personal information
- Born: November 29, 1947 Brooklyn, New York, U.S.
- Died: June 8, 2022 (aged 74)
- Listed height: 6 ft 2 in (1.88 m)
- Listed weight: 200 lb (91 kg)

Career information
- High school: Erasmus Hall (Brooklyn, New York)
- College: Marquette (1966–1969)
- NBA draft: 1969: 5th round, 66th overall pick
- Drafted by: Boston Celtics
- Playing career: 1969–1975
- Position: Point guard
- Number: 25, 23, 24

Career history
- 1969–1972: Pittsburgh Pipers / Condors
- 1972–1974: Memphis Tams
- 1974–1975: Milwaukee Bucks
- 1975–1978: Flamengo
- 1979: Club Municipal

Career highlights
- 3× ABA All-Star (1972–1974); No. 24 retired by Marquette Golden Eagles

Career ABA and NBA statistics
- Points: 8,114 (18.6 ppg)
- Rebounds: 1,457 (3.3 rpg)
- Assists: 1,561 (3.6 apg)
- Stats at NBA.com
- Stats at Basketball Reference

George Thompson (November 29, 1947 – June 8, 2022) was an American professional basketball player. A 6'2" guard, he attended Erasmus Hall High School from which he graduated in 1965. He then attended Marquette University, where he played for coach Al McGuire. He held the Marquette scoring record for 40 years, and held the single season scoring record of over 20 ppg for 50 years before his record was broken by Markus Howard.

He was selected by the Boston Celtics in the fifth round of the 1969 NBA draft but began his career with the Pittsburgh Pipers of the upstart American Basketball Association. Thompson played five seasons (1969–1974) in the ABA, including two with the Memphis Tams, appearing as an All-Star three times. He then played one season with the Milwaukee Bucks of the NBA, in 1974–75. He scored 8,114 combined ABA/NBA career points.

Thompson holds the ABA record for free throws attempted in a single game with 30.

Thompson was elected to the Wisconsin Athletic Hall of Fame in 2001. He was inducted into the New York City Basketball Hall of Fame in 2013. Thompson is also in the Marquette Hall of Fame and was inducted into the Brooklyn New York Hall of Fame in October 2016. He died on June 8, 2022, of complications from diabetes.

== Career statistics ==
Legend
GP	Games played	GS	Games started	MPG	Minutes per game
FG%	Field goal percentage	3P%	3-point field goal percentage	FT%	Free throw percentage
RPG	Rebounds per game	APG	Assists per game	SPG	Steals per game
BPG	Blocks per game	PPG	Points per game	**Bold**	Career high

=== ABA ===
Year	Team	GP	GS	MPG	FG%	3P%	FT%	RPG	APG	SPG	BPG	PPG
1969–70	Pittsburgh	54	–	18.8	.441	.219	.677	1.7	1.4	–	–	13.0
1970–71	Pittsburgh	**82**	–	30.1	.471	.256	.715	3.5	2.5	–	–	18.5
1971–72	Pittsburgh	70	–	**41.5**	**.481**	**.311**	.779	**5.0**	3.7	–	–	**27.0**
1972–73	Memphis	80	–	36.6	.456	.274	.784	3.3	5.0	–	–	21.6
1973–74	Memphis	78	–	35.0	.475	.185	**.790**	3.5	**5.1**	**1.5**	**0.3**	19.2
Career		364	–	33.1	.468	.265	.760	3.5	3.7	1.5	0.3	20.1

=== NBA ===
Year	Team	GP	GS	MPG	FG%	3P%	FT%	RPG	APG	SPG	BPG	PPG
1974–75	Milwaukee	**73**	–	**27.2**	**.443**	–	**.785**	**2.5**	**3.1**	**0.9**	**0.1**	**10.7**
Career		73	–	27.2	.443	–	.785	2.5	3.1	0.9	0.1	10.7

=== College ===
Year	Team	GP	GS	MPG	FG%	3P%	FT%	RPG	APG	SPG	BPG	PPG
1966–67	Marquette	**29**	–	–	**.500**	–	.658	7.2	–	–	–	18.0
1967–68	Marquette	**29**	–	–	.497	–	.648	**8.6**	1.2	–	–	**22.9**
1968–69	Marquette	**29**	–	–	.465	–	**.725**	7.9	**1.9**	–	–	20.2
Career		87	–	–	.487	–	.678	7.9	1.5	–	–	20.4
