= Craig Raymond =

American basketball player (1945–2018)

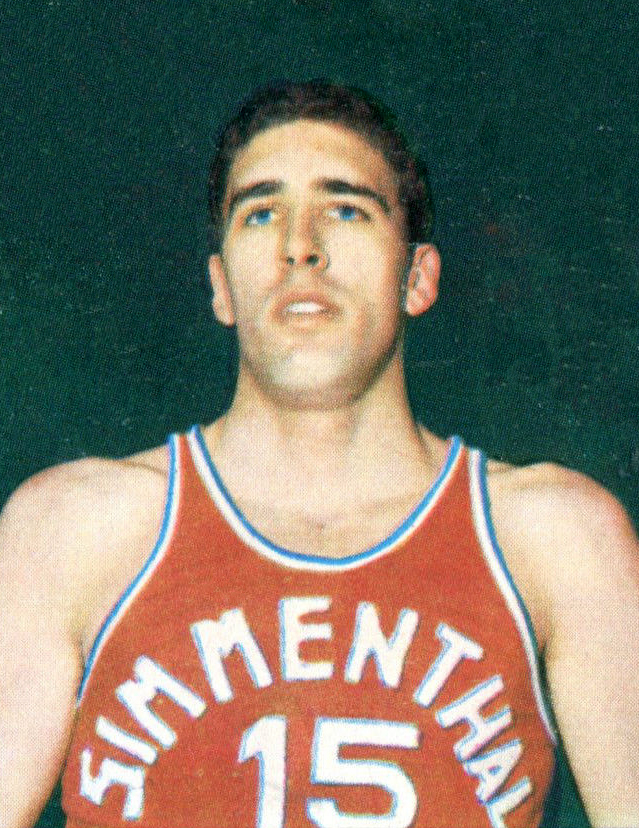
- Raymond with Olimpia Milano in 1968

Personal information
- Born: April 5, 1945 Aberdeen, Washington, U.S.
- Died: October 15, 2018 (aged 73) Provo, Utah, U.S.
- Listed height: 6 ft 11 in (2.11 m)
- Listed weight: 235 lb (107 kg)

Career information
- High school: Hudson's Bay (Vancouver, Washington)
- College: BYU (1964–1967)
- NBA draft: 1967: 1st round, 12th overall pick
- Drafted by: Philadelphia 76ers
- Playing career: 1967–1973
- Position: Center
- Number: 20, 21, 54, 12, 32, 51, 52

Career history
- 1967–1968: Olimpia Simmenthal Milano
- 1968–1969: Wilkes-Barre Barons
- 1969: Philadelphia 76ers
- 1969: Pittsburgh Pipers
- 1969–1970: Los Angeles Stars
- 1970–1971: Memphis Pros
- 1971–1972: The Floridians
- 1972: San Diego Conquistadors
- 1972–1973: Indiana Pacers

Career highlights
- Fifth-team Parade All-American (1963)

Career NBA and ABA statistics
- Points: 1,658 (6.9 ppg)
- Rebounds: 1,510 (6.3 rpg)
- Assists: 327 (1.4 apg)
- Stats at NBA.com
- Stats at Basketball Reference

Craig Milford Raymond (April 5, 1945 – October 15, 2018) was an American professional basketball player.

Raymond played basketball at Hudson's Bay High School in Vancouver, Washington, where he was named a Parade All-American during his senior year. A 6'11" center from Brigham Young University, Raymond played with Dick Nemelka, Jeff Congdon, and Jim Jimas on BYU teams that competed in the NCAA Tournament in 1965 and in 1966 won the National Invitation Tournament in New York City. In the championship game, he scored 21 points with nearly the same number of rebounds. He was drafted by the Philadelphia 76ers with the twelfth pick of the 1967 NBA draft. Raymond spent one year with the 76ers, then jumped to the rival American Basketball Association and played four seasons with the Pittsburgh Pipers, the Los Angeles Stars, the Memphis Pros, The Floridians, the San Diego Conquistadors, and the Indiana Pacers. His ABA highlight was an improbable late-season streak with the Los Angeles Stars all the way to the ABA finals against the Indiana Pacers. In his NBA/ABA career, Raymond averaged 6.9 points per game and 6.3 rebounds per game.

Raymond was involved in the Church of Jesus Christ of Latter-day Saints, including serving as a Bishop in the San Diego area. He was married to his wife Carolyn Bodily Raymond for 51 years.

== Career statistics ==
Legend
GP	Games played	GS	Games started	MPG	Minutes per game
FG%	Field goal percentage	3P%	3-point field goal percentage	FT%	Free throw percentage
RPG	Rebounds per game	APG	Assists per game	SPG	Steals per game
BPG	Blocks per game	PPG	Points per game	**Bold**	Career high
*	Led the league

=== NBA/ABA ===
==== Regular season ====
Year	Team	GP	MPG	FG%	3P%	FT%	RPG	APG	PPG
1968–69	Philadelphia	27	6.6	.344		.647	2.5	.3	2.0
1969–70	Pittsburgh (ABA)	34	23.2	.437	–	.531	7.5	1.6	7.4
1969–70	L.A. Stars (ABA)	46	**34.1**	**.491**	.000	.670	**11.7**	**2.2**	**15.4**
1970–71	Memphis (ABA)	56	19.7	.430	.000	.632	5.2	1.6	6.3
1971–72	Florida (ABA)	**64**	13.9	.458	.000	.632	4.4	1.0	4.0
1972–73	San Diego (ABA)	8	16.9	.323	–	**.750**	7.9	.8	3.6
1972–73	Indiana (ABA)	6	5.5	.250	–	.500	1.7	.2	.8
Career (ABA)		214	21.1	.457	.000	.630	6.7	1.5	7.5
Career (overall)		241	19.5	.452	.000	.631	6.3	1.4	6.9

==== Playoffs ====
Year	Team	GP	MPG	FG%	3P%	FT%	RPG	APG	PPG
1970	L.A. Stars (ABA)	**17***	**39.1**	.471	–	.769	**14.9**	**2.4**	**17.4**
1971	Memphis (ABA)	2	8.5	.429	–	**1.000**	2.0	.5	4.0
1972	Florida (ABA)	4	15.5	**.652**	–	.667	5.5	.5	8.0
Career		23	32.3	.485	–	.771	12.2	1.9	14.6
