= Warren Davis (basketball) =

American basketball player (born 1943)

Personal information
- Born: June 30, 1943 (age 83) Atlantic City, New Jersey, U.S.
- Listed height: 6 ft 6 in (1.98 m)
- Listed weight: 212 lb (96 kg)

Career information
- High school: Atlantic City (Atlantic City, New Jersey)
- College: North Carolina A&T (1961–1964)
- NBA draft: 1965: 6th round, 46th overall pick
- Drafted by: New York Knicks
- Playing career: 1964–1979
- Position: Power forward / small forward
- Number: 30, 44, 55, 13, 21, 32, 35

Career history
- 1965–1967: Wilkes-Barre Barons
- 1967–1970: Anaheim Amigos / Los Angeles Stars
- 1970: Pittsburgh Pipers
- 1970–1971: The Floridians
- 1971–1972: Carolina Cougars
- 1972–1973: Memphis Pros/Tams
- 1974–1978: Allentown Jets
- 1978–1979: Jersey Shore Bullets

Career highlights
- 2× ABA All-Star (1969, 1970); 2× EBA champion (1975, 1976); All-EBA Second Team (1975)
- Stats at Basketball Reference

Warren Lee Davis (born June 30, 1943) is an American former basketball player in the American Basketball Association (ABA). He played for the Anaheim Amigos (1967–68), Los Angeles Stars (1968–70), Pittsburgh Pipers (1970), The Floridians (1970–71), Carolina Cougars (1971–72) and Memphis Pros/Memphis Tams (1972–73). A forward, he was drafted in 1965 by the NBA's New York Knicks in the sixth round (2nd pick, 46th overall).

Born and raised in Atlantic City, New Jersey, Davis played prep basketball at Atlantic City High School.

He was named to the 1969 and 1970 ABA West All-Star Teams.

In 6 seasons he played in 447 Games, played 13,090 Minutes (29.3 per game), had a .480 Field Goal Percentage (2,022 for 4,215), .125 Three Point Field Goal Percentage (2 for 16), .691 Free Throw Percentage (1,403 for 2,030), 4,097 Rebounds (9.2 per game), 944 Assists (2.1 per game) and 5,449 Points (12.2 per game).

Davis played in the Eastern Professional Basketball League (EPBL) / Eastern Basketball Association (EBA) / Continental Basketball Association (CBA) for the Wilkes-Barre Barons from 1965 to 1967, the Allentown Jets from 1974 to 1978, and the Jersey Shore Bullets from 1978 to 1979. He won an EBA championship with the Jets in 1975 and 1976. Davis was selected to the All-EBA Second Team in 1975.

== Career statistics ==
Legend
GP	Games played	GS	Games started	MPG	Minutes per game
FG%	Field goal percentage	3P%	3-point field goal percentage	FT%	Free throw percentage
RPG	Rebounds per game	APG	Assists per game	SPG	Steals per game
BPG	Blocks per game	PPG	Points per game	**Bold**	Career high
*	Led the league

=== ABA ===
==== Regular season ====
Year	Team	GP	GS	MPG	FG%	3P%	FT%	RPG	APG	PPG
1967–68	Anaheim	54		33.6	.453	.143	.649	10.5	1.4	**17.0**
1968–69	Los Angeles	78		30.8	.501	.000	.651	10.0	1.7	12.7
1969–70	Los Angeles	46		32.7	.495	**1.000**	**.772**	10.9	2.3	16.0
1969–70	Pittsburgh	34		**33.7**	**.502**	.000	.672	**12.0**	**4.1**	12.6
1970–71	Florida	76		26.3	.449	.000	.697	8.4	2.2	10.9
1971–72	Carolina	**41***		32.9	.481	.000	.681	9.0	2.4	13.6
1971–72	Memphis	**45***		21.8	.481	.000	.706	7.2	1.8	7.2
1972–73	Memphis	73		26.0	**.502**	–	.758	7.1	2.0	9.2
Career		447		29.3	.480	.125	.691	9.2	2.1	12.2
All-Star		2	0	14.5	.364	.000	1.000	4.5	1.0	4.5

==== Playoffs ====
Year	Team	GP	MPG	FG%	3P%	FT%	RPG	APG	PPG
1971	Memphis	6	30.0	.483	–	.759	8.0	5.2	13.0
