= Larry Cannon (basketball) =

American basketball player (1947–2024)

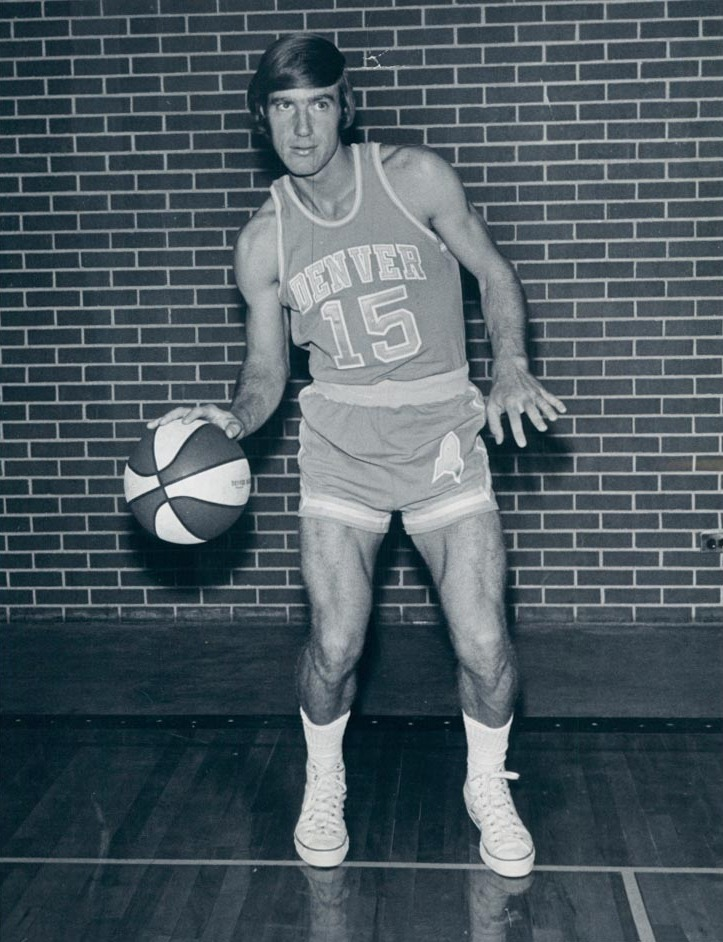

Personal information
- Born: April 12, 1947 Philadelphia, Pennsylvania, U.S.
- Died: May 29, 2024 (aged 77) Fort Myers, Florida, U.S.
- Listed height: 6 ft 5 in (1.96 m)
- Listed weight: 195 lb (88 kg)

Career information
- High school: Abraham Lincoln (Philadelphia, Pennsylvania)
- College: La Salle (1966–1969)
- NBA draft: 1969: 1st round, 5th overall pick
- Drafted by: Chicago Bulls
- Playing career: 1969–1977
- Position: Shooting guard
- Number: 30, 35, 33, 14
- Coaching career: 1975–1979

Career history

Playing
- 1969–1970: Miami Floridians
- 1970–1971: Denver Rockets
- 1971: Memphis Pros
- 1971–1973: Indiana Pacers
- 1974: Philadelphia 76ers
- 1976–1977: Lancaster Red Roses

Coaching
- 1975–1977: Lancaster Red Roses
- 1978–1979: Baltimore Metros / Mohawk Valley Thunderbirds

Career highlights
- ABA champion (1972); All-ABA Second Team (1971); Fourth-team Parade All-American (1965)

Career ABA and NBA statistics
- Points: 3,545 (16.6 ppg)
- Rebounds: 620 (3.9 rpg)
- Assists: 722 (2.6 apg)
- Stats at NBA.com
- Stats at Basketball Reference

Lawrence T. Cannon (April 12, 1947 – May 29, 2024) was an American basketball player. Born and raised in Philadelphia, Cannon was selected in the first round of the 1969 NBA draft by the Chicago Bulls with the fifth overall pick, but he instead elected to go with the American Basketball Association (ABA) where he was selected in the first round of the ABA draft by the Miami Floridians. In his second ABA season he was selected All-ABA second-team, averaging 26.6 points per game. Over his shortened career he averaged 16.6 points per game in his ABA/NBA career after his All-American career at La Salle University. Cannon was forced to retire from basketball due to a chronic medical condition, phlebitis in his legs.

== Early life ==
Cannon was born on April 12, 1947, in Philadelphia to William and Teresa Cannon. He had four brothers. He learned to play basketball beginning at eight-years old from his five-year older brother Billy, who later attended La Salle College (now La Salle University). Cannon attended Abraham Lincoln High School in Philadelphia, where he played on the basketball team. In 1964, Philadelphia's high school coaches selected Cannon first-team All-Public League.

In the summer of 1964, he participated in an exhibition game between New York and Philadelphia area players at the 1964 New York World's Fair. Cannon was the most valuable player in the high school players' game. He was scouted and recruited by representatives of the University of Nebraska and University of Michigan at the World's Fair.

Cannon led Lincoln to its first Philadelphia Public League championship in 1965, a 74–71 win over Benjamin Franklin High School. Cannon scored 31 points in the title game. He averaged 35.1 points per game that season (1964–65), second only to Wilt Chamberlain's Public League season averages in 1954 (37.8 points per game) and 1955 (47.2 points per game). Lincoln lost the 1965 interleague City championship game to Catholic League champion Bishop Neumann High School, 75–66, with Cannon leading all scorers with 28 points.

In the 1965 Public League quarterfinal playoffs, Cannon shot 21-for-47 to score 49 points, 34 in the second half; setting a Public League and city-leagues postseason record as Lincoln defeated Roxborough High School, 84–78 (surpassing Chamberlain's 48 point high). His 493 total points that season were second only to Chamberlain's 566 points (1955) in the history of Philadelphia Public League play.

In 1965, both the Associated Press (AP) and United Press International (UPI) named him to their first-team high school All-State basketball teams. Cannon was honorable mention on UPI's All-State team the preceding season (1964). Cannon was also a high school Parade All-American. He was invited to play in the Dapper Dan Roundball Classic.

In high school, Cannon set scoring records that still stand. At the end of his high school career, Cannon had scored more career total points all-time than any Philadelphia high school players except Wilt Chamberlain (2,206) and William "Billy" Hoy (1,419; who played for St. Thomas More High School in Philadelphia's Catholic League, graduating in 1959). Chamberlain's three-year varsity career total of 2,206 points was surpassed in 2002 by Maureece Rice, who was in his fourth year of varsity play. Rice also played in the era of the three-point shot. Chamberlain's 2,206 has since been surpassed by two others and Cannon is no longer in the top 25 all-time Philadelphia high school career point leaders.

== College career ==
Cannon attended La Salle University (then La Salle College) in Philadelphia, after being recruited by La Salle basketball head coach Bob Walters in 1965. Walters resigned due to ulcers and Cannon never played for him. Cannon was pursued by 10 to 15 schools with scholarship offers, but chose La Salle chiefly on the advice of his brother Bill, a La Salle alumnus. It had also impressed him that a Villanova University recruiter told Cannon that even if he did not attend Villanova, he should go to a Big 5 school.

He played varsity basketball at La Salle from 1966 to 1969, in the Middle Atlantic Conference (MAC). As a sophomore in 1966–1967, Cannon averaged 18.7 points, 10.3 rebounds and 3.0 assists as LaSalle finished 14–12 under head coach Joseph Heyer. Cannon led the team in rebounding and was second in scoring. He was fourth in the MAC in scoring average and seventh in rebounds per game.

LaSalle finished 20–8 under head coach Jim Harding in 1967–1968, as Cannon averaged 19.5 points, 9.9 rebounds and 4.8 assists in his junior year. He led the Explorers in scoring and assists, and was second in rebounding. He led the MAC in total points and was fourth in points per game. Cannon was eighth in total rebounds and 10th in rebounds per game in the MAC. La Salle won the 1968 MAC championship and played in the 1968 NCAA Men's Division I Basketball Tournament. La Salle lost to Columbia University, 83–69 in the first round of the tournament. Cannon played the most minutes of any player in the game (40), scoring 14 points. Harding left after one year to coach in professional basketball.

In 1968–69, Tom Gola, a former La Salle player and longtime Philadelphia sports figure and member of the Naismith Hall of Fame, became head coach. Cannon helped lead La Salle to a 23–1 record. This La Salle team has been regarded as the best in Philadelphia Big 5 basketball history. In addition to Cannon, the team included future NBA and ABA players Ken Durrett, Bernie Williams and Roland "Fatty" Taylor.

In early February 1969, seventh ranked La Salle defeated eighth ranked Villanova University (led by Howard Porter), 74–67 in one of the most anticipated games in Big 5 history. Gola's moving Cannon to defend Villanova forward Johnny Jones was a key to the victory. This was a significant move as there had been tension between Gola and Cannon during the season, including over Cannon's defense. Cannon's best game at La Salle was on February 21, 1969, against Spencer Haywood and Detroit Mercy. La Salle won 98–96, and Cannon had 32 points, with 18 rebounds.

The AP ranked La Salle No. 2 in college basketball at the end of the season, behind only national champion UCLA. However, La Salle was not permitted to participate in the 1969 NCAA tournament because of rules violations that had occurred under coach Harding. During his senior season, Cannon averaged 19.0 points, 6.4 rebounds and 6.1 assists, leading the team in total assists (140), while being second on the team in both scoring average and total rebounds (147). He received second-team All-America recognition. The Associated Press named him to its first-team All-Pennsylvania College Basketball Team. Over his final two seasons La Salle was 43–9, with a 15–0 record in the Middle Atlantic Conference.

In 75 career games over his three seasons at La Salle, Cannon averaged 19.1 points, 9.0 rebounds and 4.6 assists, with 1,430 total points and a 45.2% field goal percentage. His 1,430 points ranked fourth in school history at the time of Cannon's graduation. This was during a period when there was no shot clock in college basketball and not three-point shot.

== Professional career ==
Cannon was a 6-foot-5-inch (1.96 m) shooting guard as a professional player. Cannon was selected by the Chicago Bulls in the first round (5th pick overall) of the 1969 NBA draft, and by the Miami Floridians in the first round of the American Basketball Association (ABA) April 1969 ABA draft. Cannon chose to play in the ABA, after being offered a four-year contract and the opportunity to play in a new league and in Miami. This was important for the ABA as the NBA was signing more top draft picks in the leagues' battle for talented players at the time. He was the only college player selected that season in the first round of both the NBA and ABA drafts to sign with the ABA.

As a rookie in 1969–1970, Cannon averaged 11.8 points, 2.5 rebounds and 2.7 assists with the Floridians, who finished 23–61 under coaches Jim Pollard (5–15) and Harold Blitman (18–46). Cannon played in 57 games, averaging 26.4 minutes per game. Reportedly, during an early November game he became upset and left the arena because he did not believe he was being given a proper amount of playing time. After his rookie season, one Miami writer (Jim Huber) called Cannon a bust who could not make the starting lineup.

In June 1970, the Floridians traded Cannon and Don Sidle to the Denver Rockets (later the Denver Nuggets) for Larry Jones, Greg Wittman and a 1971 No. 2 draft pick. Cannon flourished with Denver as a starting shooting guard. In 1970–71, he played nearly 39 minutes per game for the Rockets under head coaches Joe Belmont (3–10) and Stan Albeck (27–44). Cannon played in 80 games, averaging 26.6 points, 4.2 rebounds and 5.2 assists per game. He was sixth in the ABA in scoring.

In 1970–71, Cannon was named to the All-ABA second team. The first team included: Rick Barry, Roger Brown, Mack Calvin, Mel Daniels and Charlie Scott. The second team included Cannon, Zelmo Beaty, John Brisker, Joe Caldwell, Donnie Freeman and Dan Issel. He was not selected to play in the ABA All-Star Game that season. He was the only ABA player in the league's history to make it to an All-ABA Team without also playing or participating in an ABA All-Star Game as well. It was the only full and healthy season of Cannon's professional career, whose future professional career was limited and then ended by recurrent blood clots. He never played more than 54 games in a season again, and never more than 26.7 minutes per game.

In October 1971, Cannon took the position that the Rockets had breached their contract with him, making him a free agent. He then signed a multi-year contract with the ABA's Memphis Pros, who reviewed the contract and likewise concluded Cannon was a free agent. The Rockets took the position their contract with Cannon was valid, and ABA commissioner Jack Dolph stopped Cannon from joining the Pros until the league could investigate the issue. Less than two weeks later, Dolph accepted Cannon's and the Pros' position and upheld the contract between Cannon and Memphis. Dolph also required Memphis to send a 1972 number one draft pick to Denver, and to pay a fine. In the same period a parallel series of events occurred between Memphis and the Utah Stars over the disputed free agency of Jimmy Jones, with Utah receiving Jones but losing a draft pick and paying a fine. In finding both free agency and punishing Memphis and Utah for signing a free agent, Utah general manager Vince Boryla said "Dolph isn't qualified to run a kindergarten class".

Cannon played in 26 games for Memphis in 1971, averaging 16.8 points in 26.7 minutes per game. In mid-December, wanting to give rookie guard Johnny Neumann more playing time, the Pros traded Cannon to the Indiana Pacers for Don Sidle (the second time he had been involved in a trade with Sidle). He played in 28 games for the Pacers. Cannon averaged 6.6 points, 2.6 assists and 1.7 rebounds, in 17.1 minutes per game. The Pacers defeated the New York Nets with Rick Barry 4–2 in the ABA finals to capture the ABA championship. However, Cannon did not play in any of the Pacers' three playoff rounds.

Cannon's time with the Pacers had already been limited by illness and injuries, when he was diagnosed in late March 1972 with blood clots in his lungs; discovered after he complained about shortness of breath. He was hospitalized and missed the end of the season with blood clots in both his legs and chest. It was reported that the blood clots originated with a blow to the chest taken during a March 12, 1972 game, while defending Larry Jones of the Floridians.

Cannon missed the entire 1972–1973 season because of blood clots. He later played summer basketball in Philadelphia's Baker League and felt alright. The Pacers reactivated Cannon in January 1974, but he played in only three games for them and was released. After providing a promise of future considerations to the Chicago Bulls who had drafted Cannon in 1969, the NBA's Philadelphia 76ers signed the 26-year old Cannon in February 1974. He played in 19 games for the 76ers, averaging nearly 18 minutes per game.

In mid-October 1974, the 76ers announced that they would not sign Cannon to play for them in the 1974–75 season based on the advice of their team doctors (including Dr. Stanley Lorber). 76ers general manager Pat Williams and head coach Gene Shue agreed Cannon had done well in training camp, and Shue thought Cannon had a chance to be a starter that season. Cannon felt good during training camp, but his legs had swelled up, and he took the doctors' advice to the 76ers also as advice to himself that he should not continue playing for the sake of his health.

He was invited to the Boston Celtics rookie-free agent camp in September 1975, and played the best of all guards in that camp. He was among the last three players that the Celtics waived in mid-October, shortly before the season started.

Overall, in his ABA/NBA career, Cannon averaged 16.6 points, 2.9 rebounds and 3.6 assists in 213 career games.

== Legacy ==
Fran Dunphy, Cannon's La Salle teammate and future head coach at the University of Pennsylvania, Temple University and La Salle, said of Cannon, "As great a player as he was, he was an even better teammate and leader . . . He made every teammate feel that they had value. He cared about all of us and wanted the best for us".

In his later years, Cannon was involved in struggles with the NBA over the pension benefits to be paid to former ABA players. He strongly believed that the style of play in the ABA revolutionized how basketball came to be played, including in the NBA. He said that the ABA players were "pioneers of the modern game", and felt strongly that the NBA needed to pay greater recognition to that fact in dealing with former ABA players and their pension benefits. It was his understanding that peers of his skill and performance level in the NBA during the same time period were receiving pensions 30 times greater than what he and other former ABA players received. In 2022, there were some improvements in the pensions provided to approximately 115 former ABA players.

== Honors ==
- Cannon was elected to the Middle Atlantic Conference Hall of Fame in 2018.
- In 1973 Cannon was elected to the Big 5 Hall of Fame. He was in the inaugural class along with Cliff Anderson (St. Josephs), Wali Jones (Villanova), Stan Pawlak (Pennsylvania), and Guy Rodgers (Temple).
- Cannon was a three-time All-Big 5 selection.
- Cannon was inducted into the "Pennsylvania Basketball Hall of Fame."
- Cannon was inducted into the La Salle Hall of Athletes in 1977.
- In 2010, Cannon was recognized as an Atlantic 10 Conference Legend.
- Cannon's # 20 jersey was retired by LaSalle in December, 2016.
- In 2016, La Salle's 1968–69 basketball team was enshrined in the Big 5 Hall of Fame.
- In 2019, La Salle's 1968–69 basketball team was inducted into the La Salle Hall of Athletes.

== Coaching career ==
Cannon served as a head coach in the Eastern Basketball Association (EBA) / Continental Basketball Association (CBA) for the Lancaster Red Roses from 1975 to 1977. His teams reached the playoffs each season, and he was named the EBA's Coach of the Year in his first season. In December 1977, he was hired to coach the Georgia Titans of the short-lived All-American Basketball Alliance. He later coached the CBA's Baltimore Metros / Mohawk Valley Thunderbirds during the 1978–79 season. Cannon accumulated a 40–20 record as a head coach in the EBA/CBA. He was an assistant coach for two years under Lefty Ervin at La Salle (1979 to 1981), and maintained his association with La Salle as a scout and consultant after that. One of the other assistant coaches on that staff was Fran Dunphy. Cannon also coached in the Puerto Rican Superior League, the Sonny Hill College League and the Baker League.

== Personal life and death ==
In the early 1980s he worked for his brother Bill, who was an attorney. He assisted in Bill Cannon's campaign for Philadelphia's District Attorney.

Cannon died on May 29, 2024.

== Career statistics ==
Legend
GP	Games played	GS	Games started	MPG	Minutes per game
FG%	Field goal percentage	3P%	3-point field goal percentage	FT%	Free throw percentage
RPG	Rebounds per game	APG	Assists per game	SPG	Steals per game
BPG	Blocks per game	PPG	Points per game	**Bold**	Career high

=== ABA/NBA ===
==== Regular season ====
Year	Team	GP	GS	MPG	FG%	3P%	FT%	RPG	APG	SPG	BPG	PPG
1969–70	Miami (ABA)	57		26.4	.383	**.267**	.681	2.5	2.7			11.8
1970–71	Denver (ABA)	**80**		**38.7**	**.436**	.261	**.794**	**4.2**	**5.2**			**26.6**
1971–72	Memphis (ABA)	26		26.7	.370	.250	.753	2.8	3.0			16.8
1971–72	Indiana (ABA)	28		17.1	.383	.167	.718	1.2	2.6			6.6
1973–74	Indiana (ABA)	3		8.7	.429	–	.333	1.0	1.0	.0	.0	2.3
1973–74	Philadelphia (NBA)	19	0	17.6	.386		.679	1.9	2.7	**.4**	**.2**	6.2
Career (ABA)		194		29.9	.412	.257	.762	3.0	3.7	.0	.0	17.7
Career (overall)		213	0	28.8	.411	.257	.760	2.9	3.6	.3	.2	16.6
