= 1973–74 Memphis Tams season =

ABA basketball team season

- Head coach: Butch van Breda Kolff
- Owner: Charlie Finley
- Arena: Mid-South Coliseum

Results
- Record: 21–63 (.250)
- Place: Division: 5th (Eastern)

The 1973–74 Memphis Tams season was the second and final season of the Memphis Tams under that name and fourth overall season of American Basketball Association basketball out in Memphis, as well as the seventh overall season of play when including the three seasons of play while out in New Orleans as the New Orleans Buccaneers. After the previous season had mercifully ended, doubt was put into play on whether the Tams would even stay in Memphis at all, as not only were the phone lines cut off from communication with the Tams organization, but the team's offices were closed during the offseason period as well. Charlie Finley tried to sell the team during this time, with a Rhode Island group being in discussion with Finley, but nothing ultimately came through from that; Finley subsequently dealt with a heart ailment for most of the summer as well, which arose a serious problem for the ABA, particularly with making schedules for the teams since they weren't even sure if the Tams were going to actually play this season by that point in time. The league's attempts to reach out to Finley finally came through by late August, with the schedules for the entire ABA being released properly on August 25 — just over a month before the season was officially due to start. The Tams hired Butch van Breda Kolff to coach the team on September 11, two days before the Tams' first preseason game began. The team ultimately floundered this season, losing 63 games in the process (which was the worst record an ABA team had to end a season at the time). They finished 9th in points scored per game, at 101.2, while finishing 8th in points allowed at 108.2 per game. At one point in the season (November 29-December 21), they lost 13 straight games, with a 12-game losing streak occurring later in the year. Their best winning streak lasted a total of only 2 games long, which they did four different times. After the season concluded, the league took over operations of the team from Finley. On July 17, 1974, Mike Storen (who was the ABA's commissioner during this season), funk/soul/disco singer Isaac Hayes, and businessmen Avron Fogelman and Kemmons Wilson bought the team, rebranding the team as the Memphis Sounds.

== ABA Draft ==
Interestingly, this year's ABA draft would involve four different types of drafts throughout the early 1973 year: a "Special Circumstances Draft" on January 15, a "Senior Draft" on April 25, a "Undergraduate Draft" also on April 25, and a "Supplemental Draft" on May 18. As such, the following selections were made in these respective drafts by the Tams, which could be considered the last official drafts the Memphis franchise would do in the ABA while using the Tams name if you don't include them using that team name during the 1974 ABA draft period.

=== ABA Special Circumstances Draft ===
Round	Pick	Player	Position	Nationality	College
1	4	Larry Kenon	PF	United States	Memphis State
2	15	Raymond Lewis	PG	United States	Cal State Los Angeles

The Tams' selection of Larry Kenon would prove to be one of the better selections made in the entire "Special Circumstances Draft" period, though Kenon would not play with the Memphis team this season despite being selected by them since he would be traded to the New York Nets before the season even began (that or sign up with the New York Nets since the Memphis Tams were acting as a franchise in purgatory following the months-long ABA draft period(s) on display in relation to the offseason period for the franchise). Kenon would also change his name from Larry to Muhsin Kenon once he retired from playing basketball altogether. Meanwhile, Raymond Lewis would never play for either the ABA or the NBA due to contract disputes involved with the NBA team that drafted him this season, the Philadelphia 76ers.

=== ABA Senior Draft ===
Round	Pick	Player	Position(s)	Nationality	College
1	2	Larry Finch	SG	United States	Memphis State
2	11	Wendell Hudson	F	United States	Alabama
3	21	Dave Langston	G	United States	Drake
4	31	Harry Rogers	PF	United States	St. Louis
5	41	Dennis Bell	SF	United States	Drake
6	51	George Karl	PG	United States	North Carolina
7	61	E. C. Coleman	PF	United States	Houston Baptist
8	71	Rod Freeman	SF	United States	Vanderbilt
9	81	Charles Mitchell	F	United States	Eastern Kentucky
10	91	Chuck Iverson	F	United States	South Dakota

Despite the Tams having the worst record of the season in the ABA during the previous season, they would not obtain the #1 pick of not just the "Senior Draft", but also the "Undergraduate Draft" and "Supplemental Draft" as well due to the San Diego Conquistadors being created as the newest expansion team of the league that same season. With that being said, the "Senior Draft" done in April is often considered the official, main draft period of the 1973 ABA draft by basketball historians. Also, the Tams would end up selecting a future Naismith Basketball Hall of Famer, albeit as a future head coach in the making, with the selection of George Karl as the 51st pick of the "Senior Draft"; Karl would make his name well known in coaching circles in the rivaling NBA following his short playing career (which had him playing for the newly-renamed San Antonio Spurs franchise that still exists to this day from 1973 until 1978 due to the Tams either trading him to the Spurs during the offseason or Karl signing with the Spurs during the offseason due to the Tams being in franchise purgatory at the time), with his coaching prowess leading many NBA teams to being playoff-caliber squads throughout most of his tenure outside of his final years while coaching with the Sacramento Kings being his biggest duds there, to the point of being one game shy from coaching 2,000 NBA games in the process there.

=== ABA Undergraduate Draft ===
Round	Pick	Player	Position(s)	Nationality	College
11 (1)	102 (2)	David Thompson	SG	United States	North Carolina State
12 (2)	111 (11)	Larry Robinson	F	United States	Texas

The "Undergraduate Draft" is considered a continuation of the "Senior Draft" that was done earlier that same day, hence the numbering of the rounds and draft picks here. Thompson would later be considered the unofficial #1 pick of the final ABA draft ever done when the Virginia Squires drafted him as the #1 pick there (though the Denver Nuggets had a bonus round pick that was officially considered the #1 pick that year by most basketball historians), though the Squires would trade him to the Nuggets later in the final ABA season ever played, meaning the Nuggets held both the unofficial and official #1 ABA draft picks of 1975, both of which were previously selected in the 1973 "Undergraduate Draft" by other teams (in the case of who's considered the official #1 pick of the 1975 ABA draft, Marvin Webster, was selected after David Thompson in this particular draft as a second round pick there).

=== ABA Supplemental Draft ===
Round	Pick	Player	Position(s)	Nationality	College
1	2	Wardell Jeffries	G	United States	Oklahoma Baptist
2	9	Slick Watts	PG	United States	Xavier University of Louisiana
3	17	Roy Simpson	F	United States	Furman
4	25	Norman Russell	C	United States	Oklahoma City
5	32	Aaron Covington	G	United States	Canisius College
6	38	Fred Lavaroni	F	United States	Santa Clara
7	45	John Wolfenberg	F	United States	Valparaiso
8	51	Jim Crawford	F	United States	La Salle College
9	57	Rick Williams	G	United States	Iowa
10	61	Joe Wise	G	United States	Bridgewater State College
11	64	Reed Johnson	G	United States	Oklahoma Christian College
12	67	Greg Jurcisin	C	United States	Connecticut

None of the twelve players selected in the "Supplemental Draft" would ever play for the Tams once this draft concluded in May, though the Memphis franchise would arguably select the most successful draft prospect from the "Supplemental Draft" with second round pick Slick Watts from Xavier University of Louisiana. While Watts would never play in the ABA, he would find success in the NBA despite going undrafted in the 1973 NBA draft by comparison, with his best year coming in 1976 with the Seattle SuperSonics due to him not just leading the NBA in both steals and assists, but also being a member of the All-NBA Defensive First Team and winning the J. Walter Kennedy Citizenship Award that year as well.

== Roster ==
1973–74 Memphis Tams roster
Players

Pos.	No.	Player	Height	Weight	DOB	From
C	33	Jim Ard	6 ft 8 in (2.03 m)	215 lb (98 kg)	September 19, 1948	Cincinnati
SF	15	Johnny Baum	6 ft 5 in (1.96 m)	200 lb (91 kg)	June 17, 1946	Temple
PG	20	Glen Combs	6 ft 2 in (1.88 m)	185 lb (84 kg)	October 30, 1946	Virginia Tech
C	34	Lee Davis	6 ft 8 in (2.03 m)	235 lb (107 kg)	October 11, 1945	North Carolina Central
C	32	Randy Denton	6 ft 10 in (2.08 m)	240 lb (109 kg)	February 18, 1949	Duke
SF	30	Charles Edge	6 ft 6 in (1.98 m)	210 lb (95 kg)	February 23, 1950	LeMoyne–Owen
SG	21	Larry Finch	6 ft 2 in (1.88 m)	185 lb (84 kg)	February 16, 1951	Memphis
PF	25	Mike Jackson	6 ft 7 in (2.01 m)	215 lb (98 kg)	July 31, 1949	Cal State LA
PF	11	Wil Jones	6 ft 8 in (2.03 m)	205 lb (93 kg)	February 27, 1947	Albany State
PG	24	Mo Layton	6 ft 1 in (1.85 m)	180 lb (82 kg)	December 24, 1948	USC
PG	24	George Lehmann	6 ft 0 in (1.83 m)	180 lb (82 kg)	May 1, 1941	Campbell
PF	35	Erwin Mueller	6 ft 8 in (2.03 m)	230 lb (104 kg)	March 12, 1944 S	an Francisco
SG	14	Johnny Neumann	6 ft 6 in (1.98 m)	200 lb (91 kg)	September 11, 1951	Mississippi
SF	25	Joe Reaves	6 ft 5 in (1.96 m)	210 lb (95 kg)	May 27, 1950	Bethel College
PF	35	Ronnie Robinson	6 ft 8 in (2.03 m)	200 lb (91 kg)	March 9, 1951	Memphis
SG	10	Wil Robinson	6 ft 2 in (1.88 m)	175 lb (79 kg)	December 25, 1949	West Virginia
SG	23	George Thompson	6 ft 2 in (1.88 m)	200 lb (91 kg)	November 29, 1947	Marquette
PF	20	Joby Wright	6 ft 8 in (2.03 m)	220 lb (100 kg)	September 5, 1950	Indiana

Coaches
Head coach
- Butch van Breda Kolff

Legend
- (DP) Unsigned draft pick
- (FA) Free agent
- (S) Suspended
- Injured

Roster

== Final standings ==
=== Eastern Division ===
Team	W	L	%	GB
New York Nets	55	29	.655	-
Kentucky Colonels	53	31	.631	2
Carolina Cougars	47	37	.560	8
Virginia Squires	28	56	.333	27
Memphis Tams	21	63	.250	34

== Awards and honors ==
1974 ABA All-Star Game selection (game played on January 30, 1974)

- George Thompson
