= Jerry Dover =

American basketball player

Personal information
- Born: October 16, 1949
- Died: March 17, 2000 (aged 50)
- Listed height: 5 ft 7 in (1.70 m)
- Listed weight: 155 lb (70 kg)

Career information
- High school: Melrose (Memphis, Tennessee)
- College: LeMoyne–Owen (1968–1971)
- NBA draft: 1971: undrafted
- Position: Point guard
- Number: 13

Career history
- 1971–1972: Memphis Pros
- Stats at Basketball Reference

Jerry L. Dover (October 16, 1949 – March 17, 2000) was an American professional basketball point guard who played one season in the American Basketball Association (ABA) for the Memphis Pros during the 1971–72. He attended Melrose High School in Memphis, Tennessee and later LeMoyne-Owen College.
