= Loyd King =

American basketball player

Personal information
- Born: May 29, 1949 (age 77) Asheville, North Carolina, U.S.
- Listed height: 6 ft 2 in (1.88 m)
- Listed weight: 180 lb (82 kg)

Career information
- High school: Clyde A. Erwin (Asheville, North Carolina)
- College: Virginia Tech (1968–1971)
- NBA draft: 1971: 15th round, 224th overall pick
- Drafted by: Milwaukee Bucks
- Position: Shooting guard
- Number: 23, 20

Career history
- 1971–1973: Memphis Pros/Tams
- Stats at Basketball Reference

Loyd King (born May 29, 1949) is a former professional basketball player. He played two seasons in the American Basketball Association (ABA).

== Biography ==
King was born Loyd Harold King in Asheville, North Carolina on May 29, 1949. He played high school basketball at Clyde A. Erwin High School in Asheville, North Carolina. He played at the collegiate level at Virginia Tech, and was inducted into the school's sports hall of fame in 1998.

King played two seasons in the American Basketball Association for the Memphis Pros/Tams. Previously, he had been drafted by the Milwaukee Bucks in the fifteenth round of the 1971 NBA draft.
