= Dennis Grey =

American basketball player (1947–2026)

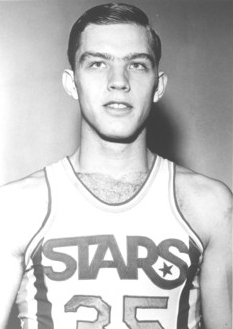
- Grey as a member of the Los Angeles Stars during his rookie season

Personal information
- Born: June 4, 1947 San Diego, California, U.S.
- Died: August 9, 2026 (aged 79) Sacramento, California, U.S.
- Listed height: 6 ft 8 in (2.03 m)
- Listed weight: 215 lb (98 kg)

Career information
- High school: Crawford (San Diego, California)
- College: US International
- Position: Center
- Number: 35, 10

Career history
- 1968–1969: Los Angeles Stars
- 1969: New York Nets
- Stats at Basketball Reference

Dennis Grey (June 4, 1947 – August 9, 2026) was an American professional basketball center who played two seasons in the American Basketball Association (ABA) as a member of the Los Angeles Stars (1968–69) and the New York Nets (1969–70). He attended California Western University. Grey died in Sacramento on August 9, 2026, at the age of 79.
