= Sam Cash =

American basketball player (born 1950)

Personal information
- Born: November 13, 1950 (age 75) San Bernardino, California, U.S.
- Listed height: 6 ft 8 in (2.03 m)
- Listed weight: 230 lb (104 kg)

Career information
- High school: Pacific (San Bernardino, California)
- College: UC Riverside (1970–1972)
- NBA draft: 1972: 5th round, 66th overall pick
- Drafted by: Cleveland Cavaliers
- Position: Power forward
- Number: 40

Career history
- 1972–1973: Memphis Tams
- Stats at Basketball Reference

Samuel Ross Cash (born November 13, 1950) is an American former basketball player who played briefly in the American Basketball Association (ABA).

He played college basketball for the University of California, Riverside.

He was selected by the Cleveland Cavaliers in the 5th round (66th pick overall) of the 1972 NBA draft. He was also selected by The Floridians in the 1972 ABA Draft. After the demise of the Floridians, the recently rebranded Memphis Tams acquired his rights in a dispersal draft.

Cash's American basketball career closed with him playing in seven games for the Memphis Tams during the 1972–73 ABA season season.
