= Tom Owens =

American basketball player (born 1949)

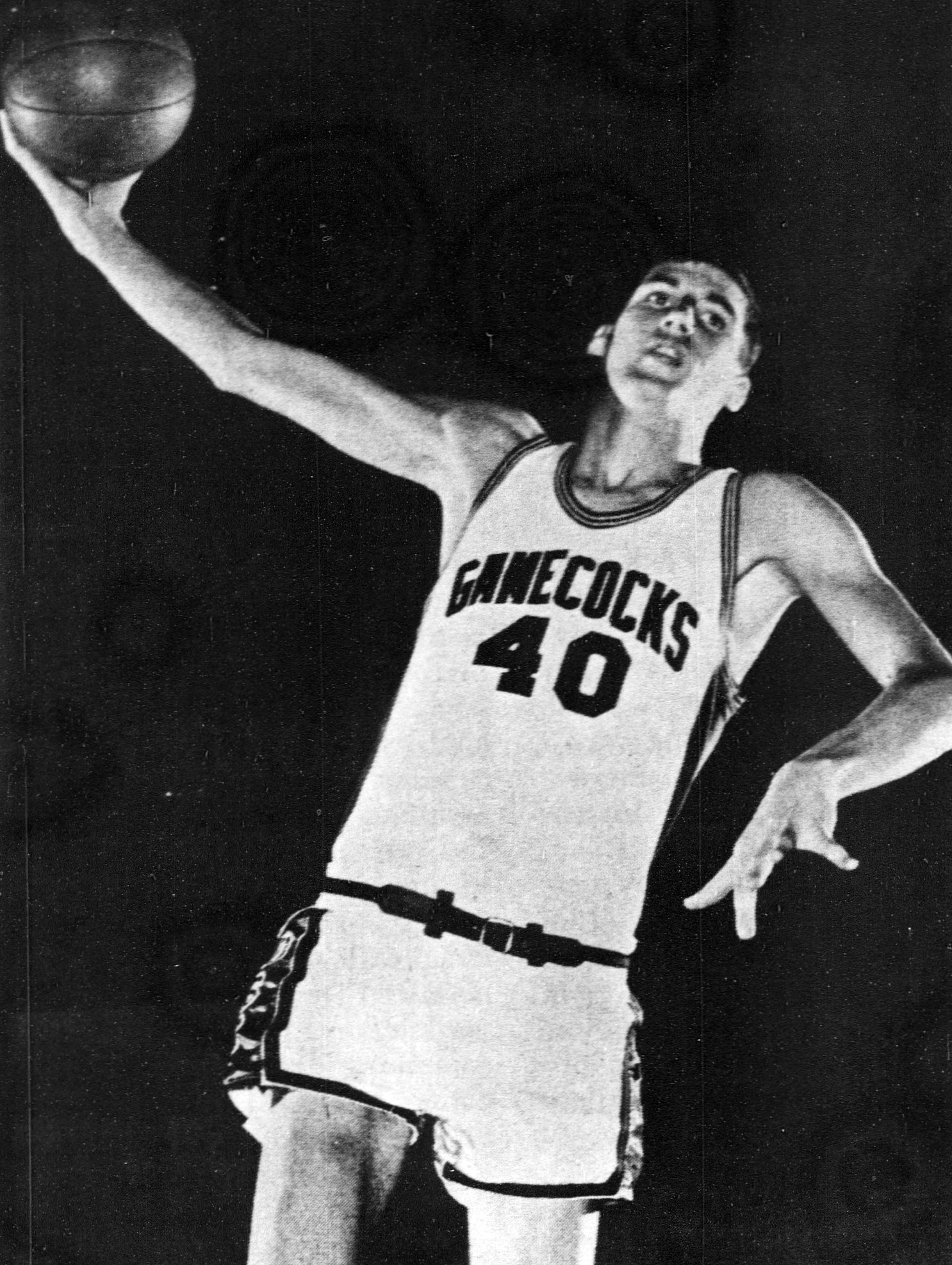
- Owens, circa 1969

Personal information
- Born: June 28, 1949 (age 77) The Bronx, New York, U.S.
- Listed height: 6 ft 10 in (2.08 m)
- Listed weight: 215 lb (98 kg)

Career information
- High school: La Salle Academy (New York City, New York)
- College: South Carolina (1968–1971)
- NBA draft: 1971: 4th round, 58th overall pick
- Drafted by: San Diego Rockets
- Playing career: 1971–1985
- Position: Center / power forward
- Number: 24, 52, 14, 25, 42, 26, 44

Career history
- 1971–1972: Memphis Pros
- 1972–1974: Carolina Cougars
- 1974: Spirits of St. Louis
- 1974–1975: Memphis Sounds
- 1975: Kentucky Colonels
- 1975–1976: Indiana Pacers
- 1976: San Antonio Spurs
- 1976–1977: Houston Rockets
- 1977–1981: Portland Trail Blazers
- 1981–1982: Indiana Pacers
- 1982–1983: Detroit Pistons
- 1983–1985: Fabriano Basket

Career highlights
- 2× First-team All-ACC (1970, 1971); Second-team All-ACC (1969)

Career ABA and NBA statistics
- Points: 9,898 (11.3 ppg)
- Rebounds: 5,985 (6.8 rpg)
- Assists: 1,533 (1.7 apg)
- Stats at NBA.com
- Stats at Basketball Reference

Thomas William Owens (born June 28, 1949) is an American former professional basketball player.

== Early life ==
A 6'9" center from the Bronx, New York, Owens played for LaSalle Academy and the South Carolina Gamecocks.

== Career ==
Owens played five seasons (1971–1976) in the American Basketball Association (ABA) and seven seasons (1976–1983) in the National Basketball Association (NBA) as a member of the Memphis Pros, Carolina Cougars, Spirits of St. Louis, Memphis Sounds, Kentucky Colonels, Indiana Pacers, San Antonio Spurs, Houston Rockets, Portland Trail Blazers, and Detroit Pistons. He scored 9,898 points and grabbed 5,985 rebounds in his ABA/NBA career.
