= Randy Denton =

American basketball player (born 1949)

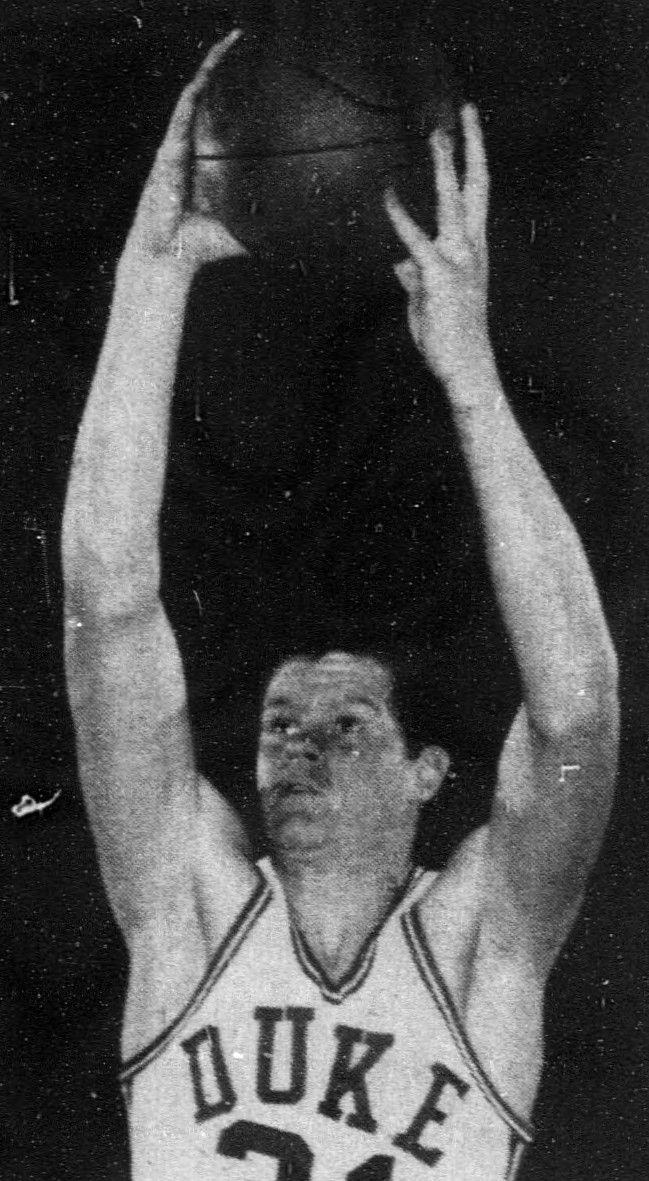
- Denton, circa 1970

Personal information
- Born: February 18, 1949 (age 77) Raleigh, North Carolina, U.S.
- Listed height: 6 ft 10 in (2.08 m)
- Listed weight: 240 lb (109 kg)

Career information
- High school: William G. Enloe (Raleigh, North Carolina)
- College: Duke (1968–1971)
- NBA draft: 1971: 4th round, 61st overall pick
- Drafted by: Boston Celtics
- Playing career: 1971–1979
- Position: Center
- Number: 54, 32, 45, 34

Career history
- 1971–1972: Carolina Cougars
- 1972–1974: Memphis Pros / Tams
- 1974–1975: Utah Stars
- 1975–1976: Spirits of St. Louis
- 1976–1977: Atlanta Hawks
- 1977–1979: Auxilium Pallacanestro Torino

Career highlights
- First-team All-ACC (1971); 2× Second-team All-ACC (1969, 1970)

Career ABA and NBA statistics
- Points: 4,749 (11.5 ppg)
- Rebounds: 3,547 (8.6 rpg)
- Assists: 528 (1.3 apg)
- Stats at NBA.com
- Stats at Basketball Reference

Randall Drew Denton (born February 18, 1949) is an American former professional basketball player.

Denton graduated from William G. Enloe High School in 1967. A 6'10" center from Duke University, he holds the all-time Duke record for average rebounds per game at 12.7. Denton played six seasons (1971–1977) in the American Basketball Association and National Basketball Association as a member of the Carolina Cougars, Memphis Pros / Tams, Utah Stars, Spirits of St. Louis, and Atlanta Hawks. He averaged 11.5 points and 8.6 rebounds in his ABA/NBA career.
