= Bob Warren (basketball) =

American basketball player

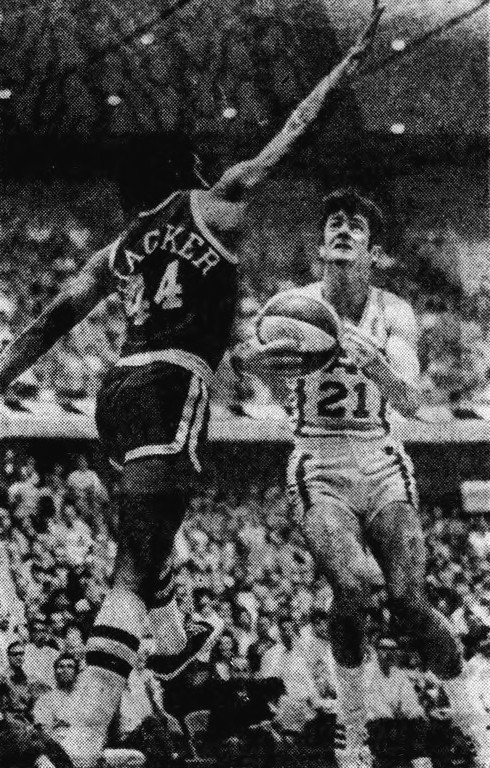
- Tom Thacker (left) attempts to block a shot by Bob Warren (right), circa 1970.

Personal information
- Born: July 17, 1946 Murray, Kentucky, U.S.
- Died: August 25, 2014 (aged 68) Hardin, Kentucky, U.S.
- Listed height: 6 ft 5 in (1.96 m)
- Listed weight: 190 lb (86 kg)

Career information
- High school: South Marshall (Benton, Kentucky)
- College: Vanderbilt (1965–1968)
- NBA draft: 1968: 4th round, 47th overall pick
- Drafted by: Atlanta Hawks
- Playing career: 1968–1975
- Position: Shooting guard
- Number: 21, 23, 12

Career history
- 1968–1970: Los Angeles Stars
- 1970–1971: Memphis Pros
- 1972: Carolina Cougars
- 1972: Dallas Chaparrals
- 1972–1974: Utah Stars
- 1974–1975: San Antonio Spurs
- 1975: San Diego Sails

Career statistics
- Points: 4,347 (8.9 ppg)
- Rebounds: 1,546 (3.2 rpg)
- Assists: 898 (1.8 apg)
- Stats at Basketball Reference

Robert Glenn Warren (July 17, 1946 – August 25, 2014) was an American professional basketball player. He was born in Murray, Kentucky.

Warren played forward at the Vanderbilt University from 1965 to 1968. His listed height was 6'5" and his weight was 190 lbs. He wore jersey number 21. He was named to multiple All-SEC teams and won the 1968 SEC Sportsmanship Award. His senior season he served as team co-captain. While he never played in the NBA (he was selected by the Atlanta Hawks in the fourth round of the 1968 NBA draft), he played professionally in the American Basketball Association from 1968 to 1976 as a member of the Los Angeles Stars, Memphis Pros, Carolina Cougars, Dallas Chaparrals, Utah Stars, San Antonio Spurs and San Diego Sails. In his eight-year ABA career, he scored 4,347 points and ranks 27th in ABA history in total games played (486).

Warren was the president of B.A.S.I.C (Brothers and Sisters in Christ) Training, a Christian ministry organization in Kentucky.
