= Memphis Sounds =

Memphis Pros Memphis Tams Memphis Sounds
- Conference: None
- Division: Eastern
- Founded: 1967
- History: New Orleans Buccaneers; 1967–1970; Memphis Pros; 1970–1972; Memphis Tams; 1972–1974; Memphis Sounds; 1974–1975; Baltimore Claws; 1975–1976 (did not play)
- Arena: Mid-South Coliseum
- Location: Memphis, Tennessee
- Team colors: Navy blue, scarlet (1970–1972) Gold, green (1972–1974) Red, white (1974–1975)
- Head coach: Babe McCarthy (1970–1972); Bob Bass (1972–1973); Butch van Breda Kolff (1973–1974); Joe Mullaney (1974–1975)
- Championships: 0
- Conference titles: no conference play in ABA
- Division titles: 0

The Memphis Sounds were an American professional sports franchise that played in Memphis, Tennessee from 1970 until 1975 as a member of the American Basketball Association (ABA). The team was first founded as the New Orleans Buccaneers in 1967.

Known during their time in Memphis as the Memphis Pros, Memphis Tams, and finally, Sounds, they played their home games at the Mid-South Coliseum.

== New Orleans Buccaneers 1967–1970 ==
The New Orleans Buccaneers were a charter member of the ABA. The Buccaneers were coached by Babe McCarthy, who was famous for two reasons. One was that he had coached Mississippi State University to a Southeastern Conference championship in an era when that league's basketball was dominated by the University of Kentucky. The other was when the then all-white Mississippi state legislature forbade the team to participate in the racially integrated NCAA Tournament. McCarthy took the team out-of-state in the dead of night and had them participate anyway, which gave him a near-legend status in the eyes of some (and the undying hatred of others). Originally, in 1970, the Buccaneers had planned to rename their franchise to the Louisiana Buccaneers in order to gain a more regional fanbase within the state of Louisiana, instead of limiting their popularity to just within the New Orleans area.

== Memphis Pros 1970–72 ==
On August 21, 1970, the Buccaneers team was sold to Mississippi businessman P. W. Blake. Ten days later, he moved the team from the state of Louisiana to Memphis and changed its name to the Memphis Pros, reportedly because the already purchased 'Bucs' uniforms could easily be converted to 'Pros' uniforms at little expense by comparison.

=== 1970–71 season ===
The Pros immediately ran into problems due to the timing of the move. The Mid-South Coliseum was nearly booked through the winter, and the Pros were only able to secure one Friday home game. They were forced to play the balance of their home schedule in several other arenas in both the states of Tennessee and Mississippi. Not surprisingly, ticket sales slowed to a trickle; by the start of the season, they'd only sold 180 season tickets.

Bob Warren of the Los Angeles Stars joined the team, and Ron Franz and Dave Nash were traded to The Floridians for Wilbert Jones, Al Cueto, and Erv Staggs; later, Red Robbins was traded to the Utah Stars for Craig Raymond and Skeeter Swift was traded to the Pittsburgh Pipers for Charlie Williams. Jimmy Jones, Steve Jones, and Wendell Ladner played in the 1971 ABA All-Star Game; Ladner, a pick in the previous ABA draft, also made the ABA All-Rookie Team. An average of 3,199 fans attended Pros home games during the season. The Pros finished with 41 wins and 43 losses, which put them in third place in the Eastern Division. The Pros advanced to the playoffs that year, but lost in the Eastern Division semifinals to the Indiana Pacers, four games to none.

The Pros almost did not survive that season because of the awkward situation they were in. In December 1970, Blake simply walked away from the team, claiming to have lost $200,000 from the operation. The league desperately tried to find a new owner, but there were no takers to acquire the team. Finally in February 1971, a community group called Memphis Area Sports Inc. bought the team for $700,000, saving the franchise entirely. It was composed of 4,600 Tennessee residents who bought the team's stock at $5, $10, and $50 a share and elected a 24-person board to run the team. Memphis bond broker Albert S. Hart was installed as team president.

=== 1971–72 season ===
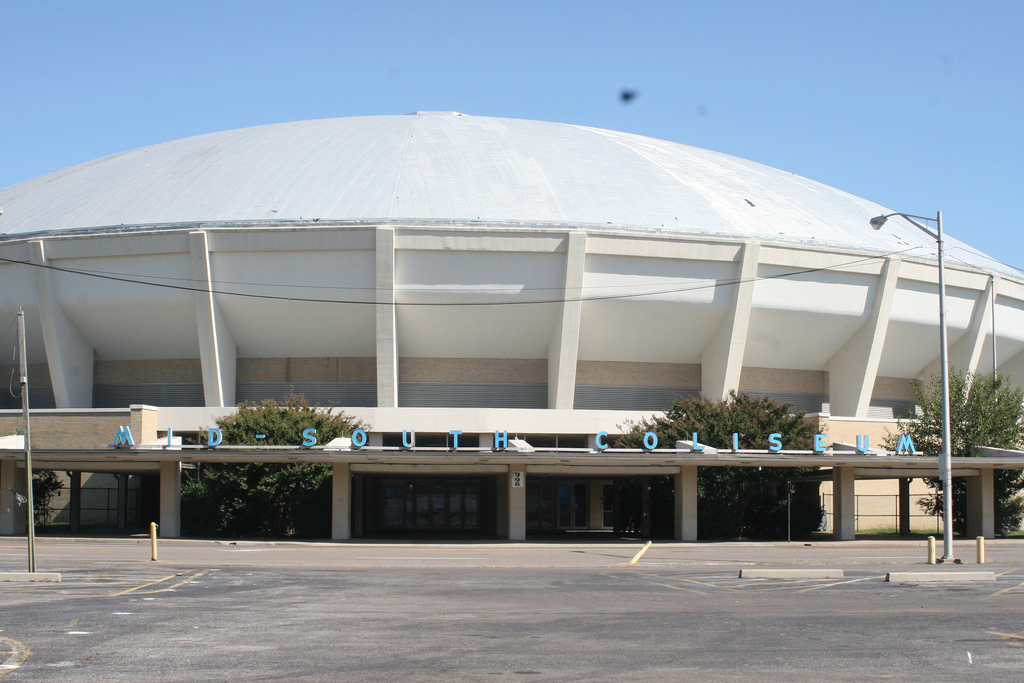
Memphis played their home games at the Mid-South Coliseum

The team signed Johnny Neumann, an underclassman All-American from the University of Mississippi, and added Larry Cannon, but lost Steve Jones to the Dallas Chaparrals through free agency; Jimmy Jones also departed from the team, ending up with the defending-champion Utah Stars.

On October 6, 1971, the Pros hosted the Boston Celtics of the National Basketball Association (NBA) for a preseason exhibition game. The Celtics won, 115–94. This was the only time a Memphis team had played an NBA team until the Vancouver Grizzlies moved to Memphis in 2001, thirty years later.

The Pros traded Cannon to the Indiana Pacers in the mid-season period for Don Sidle, and executed another midseason trade which sent Ladner, Warren, and Tom Owens to the Carolina Cougars for Randy Denton, Warren Davis, and George Lehmann. The latter trade was initiated by Hart without consulting McCarthy first.

The Pros had one player, Wil Jones, play in the 1972 ABA All-Star Game.

Despite (or perhaps because of) all the personnel moves, the team finished with only 26 wins against 58 losses, which put them in fifth (last) place in the Western Division, 34 games behind the Utah Stars, and kept them out of the playoffs.

Although they averaged 4,441 fans per home game, the team's financial problems cropped up again, which forced the league to take control of the team for a second time.

On April 27, 1972, McCarthy resigned as the Pros' coach.

== Memphis Tams 1972–74 ==
On June 13, 1972, the team and its debts were purchased by Charles O. Finley, who also owned Major League Baseball's Oakland Athletics and the National Hockey League's California Golden Seals. Legendary former University of Kentucky head coach Adolph Rupp became team president during this period. Rupp was mostly a figurehead that Finley would fly into games to sit at the press table so others could see him during games. The winning entry in a "Rename the Team" contest was the Memphis Tams. The nickname was an acronym for Tennessee – Arkansas – Mississippi, and the logo was a tam o'shanter-style hat in white, green, and gold, which were also the new team colors, shared with Oakland-area based teams the Athletics and Golden Seals. McCarthy was succeeded by Bob Bass.

According to Loose Balls, the impetus for Finley to buy a basketball team came out of initial desperation. Bass, hearing from Rudy Martzke (both then employees of the Miami Floridians) about Finley owning a team in every league but basketball, decided to call up Finley about buying their struggling team. While Finley didn't go with Bass on buying the team, he was spurred by the suggestion of his friend Dick Tinkham (a part owner of the Pacers) to buy the Memphis franchise because it was cheaper and a better team.

=== 1972–73 season ===
The Tams landed George Thompson in a dispersal draft of Pittsburgh Condors players. Gerald Govan was traded to the Utah Stars for Merv Jackson. Thompson played in the ABA All-Star Game, but the Tams finished the season with only 24 wins compared to 60 losses. It was the worst record in the ABA and put them in fifth (last) place in the Eastern Division, 33 games behind the Cougars. The Tams did not make the playoffs, in part due to heavy roster turnover (they made 28 roster moves during the first two months of the season alone). Despite their poor play, they still averaged 3,476 fans per home game.

Finley had the team wear all possible combinations of green, white, and gold tops and trunks. However, he had little to no involvement with franchise operations personally. Despite his earlier promises, he was already in negotiations with officials in St. Paul, Minnesota to move the team there. When word got out, Finley went from the franchise's savior to a pariah almost overnight. He didn't help his own cause by instituting several cost-cutting moves with the team.

=== 1973–74 season ===
The Tams picked up draft picks Larry Kenon and Larry Finch. The Tams also used a draft pick to select underclassman David Thompson, but he stayed in college. Finley had asked the ABA to look into his claims that ABA president Bill Daniels had a conflict of interest due to asking Finley to pay him a finder's fee for helping Finley find potential buyers for his team. The ABA declined to investigate Finley's charges.

Finley tried to sell the team to a group of investors from Providence, Rhode Island, with a potential interest in moving the team there, but no sale was forthcoming. For much of the summer, the Tams' status was up in the air. Bass had resigned to become the ABA's supervisor of officials, and the team offices had been closed since mid-June. Finley spent much of the summer recovering from heart problems, but remained silent about his plans even after leaving the hospital. It was not until late August that Finley sent word that the Tams would play for the upcoming season. In the process, he'd held up almost all of the league's radio and TV contracts. Even then, the team had no coach and virtually no front office when training camp opened up in September. Finally, two days before the team's first preseason game, Butch van Breda Kolff was hired as general manager and head coach.

The Tams signed Charlie Edge, traded Larry Kenon to the New York Nets for Jim Ard and John Baum, and traded Johnny Neumann to the Utah Stars for Glen Combs, Ronnie Robinson, Mike Jackson, and cash. George Thompson played in the ABA All-Star game, but the team had another poor season, finishing with 21 wins and 63 losses—the worst record in all of pro basketball.

With their poor play, the team's home attendance dropped by about one-third from the prior season as the Tams averaged 2,331 fans per home game. This was largely because Finley seemed to lose whatever interest he had left in the Tams. He went weeks without communicating with van Breda Kolff about team business or roster moves. He also stopped putting out programs entirely, replacing them with free typed mimeographed lineup sheets. Van Breda Kolff was visibly frustrated with the situation, telling Basketball News that the Tams would be a solid franchise if they just had solid backing.

== Memphis Sounds 1974–75 ==
It soon became apparent that the Tams were not high on the list of Finley's priorities. Amenities like programs began to disappear, and morale suffered as players began to wonder if they would receive paychecks and if those would clear the bank when they did. After two seasons of this, the ABA stepped in and took control of the team for a third time. ABA Commissioner Mike Storen resigned his position with the league to take over the operation and run the team in Memphis.

Storen lined up several notable local figures as co-owners of the new team, including funk and soul musician Isaac Hayes and Holiday Inn founder Kemmons Wilson. Storen named the new team the Memphis Sounds and developed a new red and white color scheme and logo, a move that was met with positive reception for both the ABA and the fans of the franchise alike.

Storen cleared out the former Tams roster and brought in veteran players such as Mel Daniels, Freddie Lewis, Roger Brown, Chuck Williams, Collis Jones, George Carter, Rick Mount, and Julius Keye. The only player who had played for the Tams who appeared in uniform for the Sounds was Larry Finch, a local favorite because he had played college basketball at Memphis State University.

The Sounds, coached by Joe Mullaney, finished the 1974–75 season with a record of 27–57, which was good for fourth place in the Eastern Division and a spot in the 1975 ABA Playoffs due to the Virginia Squires having a faultier operation by comparison. Unfortunately for the Sounds, their first round opponent was the Kentucky Colonels, who had won the Eastern Division and defeated the Sounds 4 games to 1 (the one win being the only playoff-game victory in the franchise's tenure while in Memphis) en route to the Colonels winning the 1975 ABA Championship.

== Aftermath ==
The team's elimination by the Colonels would be the last meaningful game that the franchise would play. Although the 1974–75 season saw the highest attendance figures during the team's stay in Memphis, both Wilson and Hayes were having financial troubles that required them to sell their shares. After the 1974–75 season, the ABA demanded that Storen and his group find more investors, sell more season tickets, and get a more favorable lease at the Mid-South Coliseum. Storen was unable to do so, and the league took over the team for a fourth time. The franchise was sold soon afterward to a group of businessmen in Baltimore, Maryland, who first renamed it the Baltimore Hustlers and then the Baltimore Claws. A local group had planned on purchasing the franchise and keep them in Memphis at first, but they ultimately reneged just one day after taking over. However, the Claws had serious financial problems under the new owners and collapsed before the season started, playing only three exhibition games (all of which ended in defeat) in its brief history.

Not long after the Claws folded, the San Diego Sails and then the Utah Stars folded early in the 1975–76 regular season, abruptly shrinking the league from 10 teams to just 7. The failure of those franchises was a key factor behind the ABA–NBA merger coming into place in the summer after the 1975–76 season ended.

When the ABA became defunct and the copyrights on its properties were allowed to lapse, a new minor league baseball team in Nashville — the Nashville Sounds — adopted the Memphis Sounds' color scheme and logo. As of 2025, the name is still in use. The use of the color scheme and stylized logo was replaced as the primary scheme after the 1998 season, but it's still used on the field for Throwback Thursday promotions, and merchandise featuring the mark remains in regular availability.

In 2001, professional basketball returned to Memphis with the NBA's Memphis Grizzlies, who relocated from Vancouver, British Columbia. The Grizzlies played their home games at The Pyramid from 2001 until 2004, before moving to FedExForum for the 2004–05 season, and have called it home since then.

During the 2015 season, the Grizzlies wore Hardwood Classics throwback uniforms honoring the heritage of the Memphis Sounds for select games. The Hardwood Classics uniforms debuted on November 16, 2015, during the Grizzlies' home game vs. the Oklahoma City Thunder. The Grizzlies planned to wear the throwback uniforms for six more games (three home, three away) during the 2015–16 season.

== Basketball Hall of Famers ==
Memphis Pros / Tams / Sounds Hall of Famers
Players
No.	Name	Position	Tenure	Inducted
9	Mel Daniels	C	1974–1975	2012
19	Roger Brown	F/G	1975	2013

== Season-by-season ==
Season	League	Division	Finish	W	L	Win%	Playoffs	Awards
Memphis Pros
1970–71	ABA	Western	3rd	41	43	.488	Lost Division Semifinals (Pacers) 0–4	—
1971–72	ABA	Western	5th	26	58	.310	—	—
Memphis Tams
1972–73	ABA	Eastern	5th	24	60	.286	—	—
1973–74	ABA	Eastern	5th	21	63	.250	—	—
Memphis Sounds
1974–75	ABA	Eastern	4th	27	57	.321	Lost Division Semifinals (Colonels) 1–4	—
