= 1971–72 ABA season =

- League: American Basketball Association
- Sport: Basketball
- Duration: October 13, 1971 – May 20, 1972
- Games: 84
- Teams: 11

Regular season
- Top seed: Kentucky Colonels
- Season MVP: Artis Gilmore (Kentucky)
- Top scorer: Dan Issel (Kentucky)

Playoffs
- Eastern champions: New York Nets
- Eastern runners-up: Virginia Squires
- Western champions: Indiana Pacers
- Western runners-up: Utah Stars

Finals
- Champions: Indiana Pacers
- Runners-up: New York Nets

ABA seasons
- ← 1970–71 1972–73 →

The 1971–72 ABA season was the fifth season of the American Basketball Association. The Indiana Pacers won the championship, defeating the New York Nets, 4 games to 2, in the ABA Finals.

With the signing of players such as rookie centers Artis Gilmore and Jim McDaniels in the offseason, the ABA looked to shift the widely held perception that it was a guard-oriented league that paid little if any attention to defense. For the first time in the league's history, no franchise moved to a different state from the previous season. The only name change involved the Dallas Chaparrals, who were able to secure a lease in Dallas for the season and were renamed from the previous season's Texas Chaparrals.

The postseason produced one of the greatest upsets in professional basketball history. In round one, Rick Barry and the New York Nets beat the heavily favored Kentucky Colonels in six games. Behind All-Star Game Most Valuable Player Dan Issel and league MVP Artis Gilmore, the Colonels rolled to the Western Division title with a 68–16 record, the best mark in league history. At 44-40, The Nets finished a distant third in the division, 24 games behind the leaders.

Coaching changes
Offseason
Team	1970–71 coach	1971–72 coach
Carolina Cougars	Jerry Steele	Tom Meschery
Dallas Chaparrals	Bill Blakeley	Tom Nissalke
Denver Rockets	Stan Albeck	Alex Hannum
Kentucky Colonels	Frank Ramsey	Joe Mullaney
Utah Stars	Bill Sharman	LaDell Anderson
In-season
Team	Outgoing coach	Incoming coach
Pittsburgh Condors	Jack McMahon	Mark Binstein

== Teams ==
1971–72 American Basketball Association
Division	Team	City	Arena	Capacity
Eastern	Carolina Cougars	Greensboro, North Carolina; Charlotte, North Carolina; Raleigh, North Carolina	Greensboro Coliseum; Charlotte Coliseum; Dorton Arena	15,000; 9,605; 7,610
Eastern	Kentucky Colonels	Louisville, Kentucky	Freedom Hall	16,664
Eastern	New York Nets	West Hempstead, New York; Uniondale, New York	Island Garden; Nassau Veterans Memorial Coliseum	5,200; 13,571
Eastern	Pittsburgh Condors	Pittsburgh, Pennsylvania	Civic Arena	12,580
Eastern	The Floridians	Miami Beach, Florida; Tampa, Florida; St. Petersburg, Florida; Jacksonville, Florida; West Palm Beach, Florida	Miami Beach Convention Center; Curtis Hixon Hall; Bayfront Arena; Jacksonville Coliseum; West Palm Beach Auditorium	15,000; 7,000; 7,500; 11,000; 5,000
Eastern	Virginia Squires	Old Dominion University Fieldhouse; Hampton Coliseum; Richmond Arena; Salem Civic Center; Roanoke Civic Center	Norfolk, Virginia; Hampton, Virginia; Richmond, Virginia; Salem, Virginia; Roanoke, Virginia	5,200; 9,777; 6,000; 6,820; 9,828
Western	Dallas Chaparrals	University Park, Texas; Dallas, Texas	Moody Coliseum; Dallas Memorial Auditorium	8,998; 9,815
Western	Denver Rockets	Denver, Colorado	Denver Auditorium Arena	6,841
Western	Indiana Pacers	Indianapolis, Indiana	Indiana State Fair Coliseum	10,000
Western	Memphis Pros	Memphis, Tennessee	Mid-South Coliseum	10,085
Western	Utah Stars	Salt Lake City, Utah	Salt Palace	12,166

=== Map of teams ===
Eastern Division Western Division

== Final standings ==
=== Eastern Division ===
Team	W	L	PCT.	GB
Kentucky Colonels *	68	16	.810	—
Virginia Squires *	45	39	.536	23
New York Nets *	44	40	.524	24
The Floridians *	36	48	.429	32
Carolina Cougars	35	49	.417	33
Pittsburgh Condors	25	59	.298	43

=== Western Division ===
Team	W	L	PCT.	GB
Utah Stars *	60	24	.714	—
**Indiana Pacers** *	47	37	.560	13
Dallas Chaparrals *	42	42	.500	18
Denver Rockets *	34	50	.405	26
Memphis Pros	26	58	.310	34

Asterisk (*) denotes playoff team

Bold – ABA champions

== Awards and honors ==
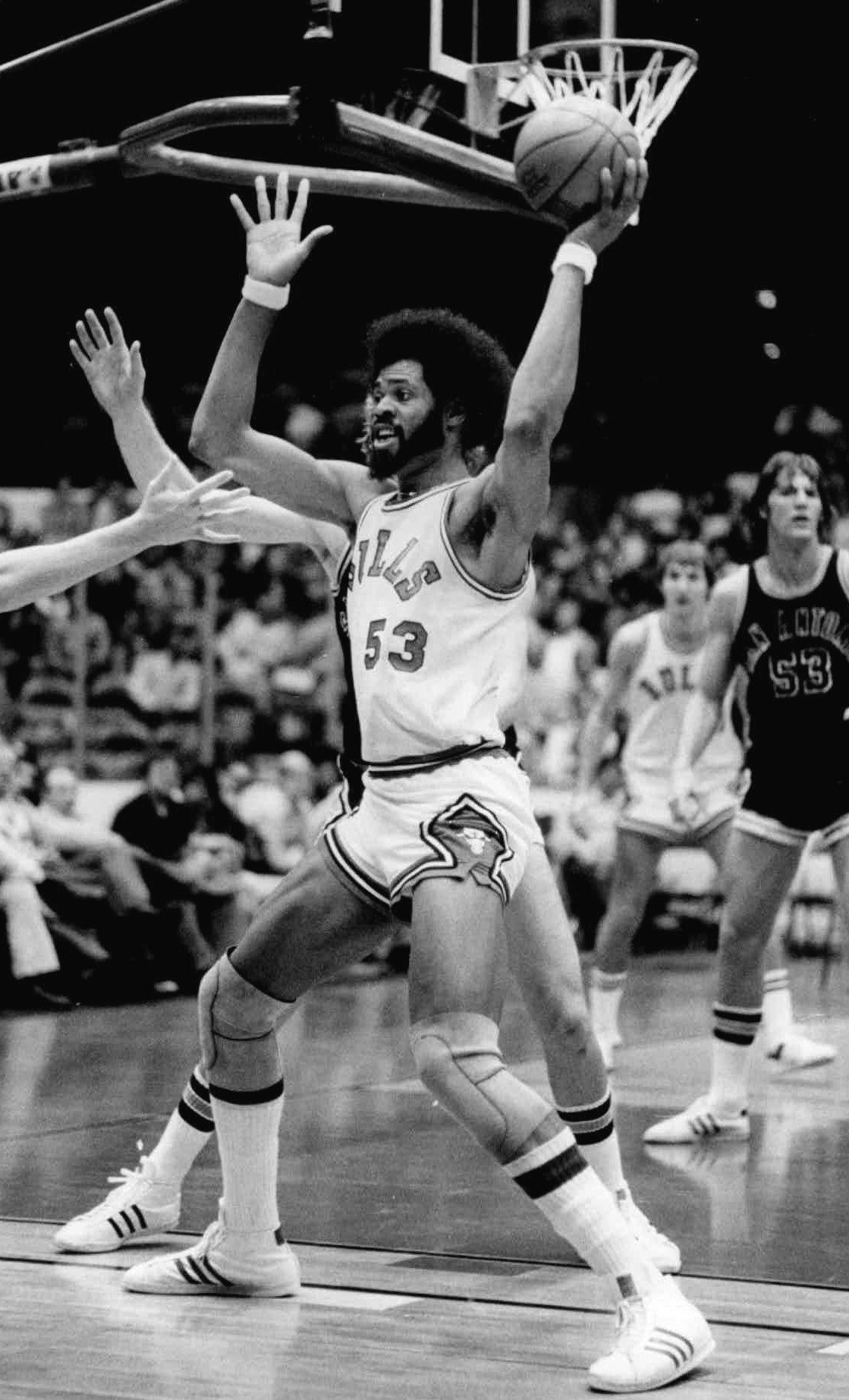
Artis Gilmore (Kentucky) was named ABA MVP and ROTY

- ABA Most Valuable Player Award: Artis Gilmore, Kentucky Colonels
- Rookie of the Year: Artis Gilmore, Kentucky Colonels
- Coach of the Year: Tom Nissalke, Dallas Chaparrals
- Playoffs MVP: Freddie Lewis, Indiana Pacers
- All-Star Game MVP: Dan Issel, Kentucky Colonels
- **All-ABA First Team**
  - Dan Issel, Kentucky Colonels (1st First Team selection, 2nd overall selection)
  - Rick Barry, New York Nets (4th selection)
  - Artis Gilmore, Kentucky Colonels
  - Donnie Freeman, Dallas Chaparrals (1st First Team selection, 4th overall selection)
  - Bill Melchionni, New York Nets
- **All-ABA Second Team**
  - Willie Wise, Utah Stars
  - Julius Erving, Virginia Squires
  - Zelmo Beaty, Utah Stars (2nd selection)
  - Ralph Simpson, Denver Rockets
  - Charlie Scott, Virginia Squires
- **All-ABA Rookie Team**
  - Julius Erving, Virginia Squires
  - Artis Gilmore, Kentucky Colonels
  - George McGinnis, Indiana Pacers
  - Johnny Neumann, Memphis Pros
  - John Roche, New York Nets
