= 1971–72 Phoenix Suns season =

Professional basketball season

- Head coach: Cotton Fitzsimmons
- General manager: Jerry Colangelo
- Owners: Karl Eller, Don Pitt, Don Diamond, Bhavik Darji, Marvin Meyer, Richard L. Bloch
- Arena: Arizona Veterans Memorial Coliseum

Results
- Record: 49–33 (.598)
- Place: Division: 3rd (Midwest); Conference: 5th (Western)
- Playoff finish: Did not qualify
- Stats at Basketball Reference

Local media
- Television: KTAR-TV
- Radio: KTAR

The 1971–72 Phoenix Suns season was the fourth season for the Phoenix Suns of the National Basketball Association. With a 49–33 record, the Suns hold the NBA record as the team with the best winning percentage to not make the playoffs. The team broke the record they set the previous year with a 48–34 finish. Head coach Cotton Fitzsimmons led the Suns in their debut season as members of the Pacific division. All home games were played at Arizona Veterans Memorial Coliseum.

Paul Silas again led the team in rebounds, averaging 11.9 per game, while also leading the Suns in assists with a 4.3 average. Connie Hawkins's 21 points a game led the club, while Dick Van Arsdale was second with his 19.7 average. Silas averaged 17.5 for the season, while both Clem Haskins and Neal Walk averaged 15.7.

== Draft picks ==
Round	Pick	Player	Position	Nationality	College
1	14	John Roche	Guard	United States	South Carolina
3	48	Dennis "Mo" Layton	Guard	United States	USC
4	65	Walt Szczerbiak	Forward	United States	George Washington
5	82	Ken Gardner	Forward	United States	Utah
5	84	Bob Kissane	Center	United States	Holy Cross
6	99	William Graham	Forward	United States	Kentucky State
7	116	Ralph Brateris	Forward	United States	Trenton State
8	133	Vernell Ellzy	Forward	United States	Florida State
9	149	Mike Johnson	Guard	United States	Kansas State
10	165	Tom Newell	Guard	United States	Hawaii
11	179	Paul Leitz	Forward	United States	Western Carolina
12	192	Floyd Mason	Forward	United States	Alcorn A&M
13	204	Ron Dorsey	Guard	United States	Tennessee State
14	213	Ken Booker	Guard	United States	UCLA
15	222	Curtis Carter	Forward	United States	Bishop

== Roster ==
1971–72 Phoenix Suns roster
Players

Pos.	No.	Player	Height	Weight	DOB	From
C	31	Mel Counts	7 ft 0 in (2.13 m)	230 lb (104 kg)	1941-10-16	Oregon State
F	16	Lamar Green	6 ft 7 in (2.01 m)	210 lb (95 kg)	1947-03-22	Morehead State
G	23	Art Harris	6 ft 4 in (1.93 m)	185 lb (84 kg)	1947-01-13	Stanford
G	11	Clem Haskins	6 ft 3 in (1.91 m)	195 lb (88 kg)	1943-07-11	Western Kentucky
F/C	42	Connie Hawkins	6 ft 8 in (2.03 m)	210 lb (95 kg)	1942-07-17	Iowa
G	1	Dennis Layton	6 ft 1 in (1.85 m)	180 lb (82 kg)	1948-12-24	USC
F/C	34	Otto Moore	6 ft 11 in (2.11 m)	205 lb (93 kg)	1946-08-27	Texas–Pan American
G	33	Charlie Scott	6 ft 5 in (1.96 m)	175 lb (79 kg)	1948-12-15	North Carolina
F	29	Paul Silas	6 ft 7 in (2.01 m)	220 lb (100 kg)	1943-07-12	Creighton
G/F	5	Dick Van Arsdale	6 ft 5 in (1.96 m)	210 lb (95 kg)	1943-02-22	Indiana
C	41	Neal Walk	6 ft 10 in (2.08 m)	220 lb (100 kg)	1948-07-29	Florida
G	10	Jeff Webb	6 ft 4 in (1.93 m)	170 lb (77 kg)	1948-07-06	Kansas State
G/F	25	John Wetzel (injured)	6 ft 5 in (1.96 m)	190 lb (86 kg)	1944-10-22	Virginia Tech

Coaches
Head coach
- Cotton Fitzsimmons (Midwestern State)

Legend
- (DP) Unsigned draft pick
- (FA) Free agent
- (S) Suspended
- Injured

== Regular season ==
=== Standings ===
Midwest Division	W	L	PCT	GB	Home	Road	Neutral	Div
y-Milwaukee Bucks	63	19	.768	–	31–5	27–12	5–2	13–5
x-Chicago Bulls	57	25	.695	6	29–12	26–12	2–1	12–6
Phoenix Suns	49	33	.598	14	30–11	19–20	0–2	7–11
Detroit Pistons	26	56	.317	37	16–25	9–30	1–1	4–14

#	Western Conference			
#	Team	W	L	PCT
1	z-Los Angeles Lakers	69	13	.841
2	y-Milwaukee Bucks	63	19	.768
3	x-Chicago Bulls	57	25	.695
4	x-Golden State Warriors	51	31	.622
5	Phoenix Suns	49	33	.598
6	Seattle SuperSonics	47	35	.573
7	Houston Rockets	34	48	.415
8	Detroit Pistons	26	56	.317
9	Portland Trail Blazers	18	64	.220

=== Game log ===
1971–72 game log
Total: 49–33 (home: 30–11; road: 19–22)
October: 3–4 (home: 2–3; road: 1–1)

Game	Date	Team	Score	High points	Location Attendance	Record	Streak
1	October 14	Milwaukee	L 97–110	Connie Hawkins (25)	Arizona Veterans Memorial Coliseum; 9,174	0–1	L 1
2	October 16	Houston	W 128–108	Paul Silas (26)	Arizona Veterans Memorial Coliseum; 8,572	1–1	W 1
3	October 22	Detroit	L 109–116	Connie Hawkins (25)	Arizona Veterans Memorial Coliseum; 7,337	1–2	L 1
4	October 24	Chicago	L 104–105	Paul Silas (21)	Arizona Veterans Memorial Coliseum; 6,970	1–3	L 2
5	October 26	Cincinnati	W 126–99	Paul Silas (26)	Arizona Veterans Memorial Coliseum; 6,901	2–3	W 1
6	October 29	@ Philadelphia	W 137–135 (2OT)	Dick Van Arsdale (28)	The Spectrum; 6,128	3–3	W 2
7	October 30	@ Baltimore	L 94–101	Dick Van Arsdale (29)	Baltimore Civic Center; 6,839	3–4	L 1

November: 8–7 (home: 4–0; road: 4–7)

Game	Date	Team	Score	High points	Location Attendance	Record	Streak
8	November 2	@ Chicago	L 101–108	Clem Haskins (22)	Chicago Stadium; 5,843	3–5	L 2
9	November 3	@ Buffalo	W 100–98	Dick Van Arsdale (31)	Buffalo Memorial Auditorium; 5,417	4–5	W 1
10	November 5	@ Cleveland	W 107–87	Clem Haskins (24)	Cleveland Arena; 3,307	5–5	W 2
11	November 6	@ Cincinnati	L 95–110	Clem Haskins (22)	Cincinnati Gardens; 3,076	5–6	L 1
12	November 9	@ Milwaukee	L 113–118	Connie Hawkins (28)	Milwaukee Arena; 10,039	5–7	L 2
13	November 12	Boston	W 128–119	Connie Hawkins (33)	Arizona Veterans Memorial Coliseum; 9,470	6–7	W 1
14	November 14	Cleveland	W 119–105	Dick Van Arsdale (21)	Arizona Veterans Memorial Coliseum; 5,336	7–7	W 2
15	November 16	@ New York	L 111–112	Dick Van Arsdale (26)	Madison Square Garden; 18,344	7–8	L 1
16	November 17	@ Boston	L 121–140	Connie Hawkins (35)	Boston Garden; 9,440	7–9	L 2
17	November 18	@ Detroit	L 126–128	Neal Walk (30)	Cobo Arena; 3,418	7–10	L 3
18	November 20	@ Atlanta	L 109–115	Paul Silas (24)	Alexander Memorial Coliseum; 5,702	7–11	L 4
19	November 23	Philadelphia	W 128–107	Mo Layton (27)	Arizona Veterans Memorial Coliseum; 6,678	8–11	W 1
20	November 25	Detroit	W 122–103	Mo Layton (21)	Arizona Veterans Memorial Coliseum; 7,846	9–11	W 2
21	November 28	@ Houston	W 116–110	Mo Layton (25)	Hofheinz Pavilion; 3,643	10–11	W 3
22	November 30	@ Portland	W 121–111 (OT)	Dick Van Arsdale (23)	Memorial Coliseum; 7,704	11–11	W 4

December: 11–5 (home: 7–3; road: 4–2)

Game	Date	Team	Score	High points	Location Attendance	Record	Streak
23	December 1	Portland	W 139–103	Paul Silas (25)	Arizona Veterans Memorial Coliseum; 6,040	12–11	W 5
24	December 4	@ Golden State	W 128–92	Clem Haskins (27)	Oakland–Alameda County Coliseum Arena; 5,491	13–11	W 6
25	December 5	Golden State	W 120–87	Connie Hawkins (21)	Arizona Veterans Memorial Coliseum; 6,886	14–11	W 7
26	December 9	Atlanta	W 135–115	Connie Hawkins (30)	Arizona Veterans Memorial Coliseum; 7,524	15–11	W 8
27	December 10	@ Los Angeles	L 117–126 (OT)	Dick Van Arsdale (31)	The Forum; 17,505	15–12	L 1
28	December 11	Houston	L 110–111	Hawkins, Silas (23)	Arizona Veterans Memorial Coliseum; 7,695	15–13	L 2
29	December 14	@ New York	W 110–100	Neal Walk (24)	Madison Square Garden; 19,253	16–13	W 1
30	December 15	@ Cincinnati	W 127–108	Dick Van Arsdale (31)	Cincinnati Gardens; 2,038	17–13	W 2
31	December 17	Detroit	W 123–102	Dick Van Arsdale (26)	Arizona Veterans Memorial Coliseum; 7,808	18–13	W 3
32	December 18	Los Angeles	L 106–132	Neal Walk (31)	Arizona Veterans Memorial Coliseum; 12,534	18–14	L 1
33	December 19	@ Seattle	L 127–130 (OT)	Paul Silas (29)	Seattle Center Coliseum; 9,189	18–15	L 2
34	December 21	Philadelphia	W 124–119	Paul Silas (29)	Arizona Veterans Memorial Coliseum; 6,272	19–15	W 1
35	December 23	Chicago	L 108–117 (OT)	Dick Van Arsdale (28)	Arizona Veterans Memorial Coliseum; 9,289	19–16	L 1
36	December 25	Seattle	W 116–86	Connie Hawkins (31)	Arizona Veterans Memorial Coliseum; 7,026	20–16	W 1
37	December 29	@ Houston	W 124–106	Clem Haskins, Dick Van Arsdale (27)	Hofheinz Pavilion; 5,389	21–16	W 2
38	December 30	Buffalo	W 123–102	Mel Counts, Paul Silas, Dick Van Arsdale (19)	Arizona Veterans Memorial Coliseum; 7,272	22–16	W 3

January: 9–8 (home: 5–3; road: 4–5)

Game	Date	Team	Score	High points	Location Attendance	Record	Streak
39	January 1	Boston	W 114–104	Connie Hawkins (25)	Arizona Veterans Memorial Coliseum; 8,056	23–16	W 4
40	January 2	Atlanta	L 111–116	Clem Haskins (29)	Arizona Veterans Memorial Coliseum; 6,670	23–17	L 1
41	January 4	@ Chicago	W 112–108	Clem Haskins (23)	Chicago Stadium; 9,009	24–17	W 1
42	January 7	@ Buffalo	W 123–110	Connie Hawkins (32)	Buffalo Memorial Auditorium; 10,247	25–17	W 2
43	January 8	@ Philadelphia	L 119–130	Otto Moore (21)	The Spectrum; 7,833	25–18	L 1
44	January 9	@ Baltimore	L 103–109	Connie Hawkins, Dick Van Arsdale (22)	College Park, MD; 7,235	25–19	L 2
45	January 11	@ Milwaukee	W 115–114	Neal Walk (42)	Milwaukee Arena; 10,111	26–19	W 1
46	January 14	Cleveland	W 117–107	Neal Walk (24)	Arizona Veterans Memorial Coliseum; 8,279	27–19	W 2
47	January 15	@ Seattle	L 110–118	Mel Counts, Paul Silas, Dick Van Arsdale (18)	Seattle Center Coliseum; 12,693	27–20	L 1
48	January 16	Baltimore	L 104–107	Dick Van Arsdale (25)	Arizona Veterans Memorial Coliseum; 6,385	27–21	L 2
All-Star Break
49	January 20	New York	W 130–109	Connie Hawkins (40)	Arizona Veterans Memorial Coliseum; 8,006	28–21	W 1
50	January 21	@ Seattle	W 128–113	Connie Hawkins (29)	Seattle Center Coliseum; 12,751	29–21	W 2
51	January 22	Los Angeles	W 116–102	Dick Van Arsdale (32)	Arizona Veterans Memorial Coliseum; 12,534	30–21	W 3
52	January 25	@ Los Angeles	L 119–129	Paul Silas (24)	The Forum; 17,505	30–22	L 1
53	January 28	Chicago	L 102–116	Paul Silas (29)	Arizona Veterans Memorial Coliseum; 9,245	30–23	L 2
54	January 29	@ Golden State	L 110–111	Paul Silas (28)	Oakland–Alameda County Coliseum Arena; 6,488	30–24	L 3
55	January 30	Atlanta	W 105–103	Clem Haskins, Connie Hawkins, Neal Walk (21)	Arizona Veterans Memorial Coliseum; 8,839	31–24	W 1

February: 11–5 (home: 7–1; road: 4–4)

Game	Date	Team	Score	High points	Location Attendance	Record	Streak
56	February 1	@ Portland	W 129–117	Dick Van Arsdale (24)	Memorial Coliseum; 4,961	32–24	W 2
57	February 2	Milwaukee	L 103–106	Connie Hawkins (37)	Arizona Veterans Memorial Coliseum; 9,365	32–25	L 1
58	February 4	Golden State	W 113–105	Dick Van Arsdale (27)	Arizona Veterans Memorial Coliseum; 8,486	33–25	W 1
59	February 5	@ Portland	W 118–117 (OT)	Dick Van Arsdale (28)	Memorial Coliseum; 6,401	34–25	W 2
60	February 6	Portland	W 107–94	Paul Silas (26)	Arizona Veterans Memorial Coliseum; 6,160	35–25	W 3
61	February 8	Philadelphia	W 120–108	Connie Hawkins (26)	Arizona Veterans Memorial Coliseum; 6,532	36–25	W 4
62	February 10	Baltimore	W 131–98	Dick Van Arsdale (27)	Arizona Veterans Memorial Coliseum; 6,794	37–25	W 5
63	February 12	Cincinnati	W 117–95	Dick Van Arsdale (31)	Arizona Veterans Memorial Coliseum; 10,766	38–25	W 6
64	February 16	Los Angeles	W 110–109	Neal Walk (30)	Arizona Veterans Memorial Coliseum; 12,534	39–25	W 7
65	February 18	Boston	W 126–115	Dick Van Arsdale (32)	Arizona Veterans Memorial Coliseum; 12,005	40–25	W 8
66	February 20	@ Detroit	W 121–107	Dick Van Arsdale (25)	Cobo Arena; 4,898	41–25	W 9
67	February 22	@ Boston	L 103–114	Connie Hawkins (30)	Boston Garden; 8,106	41–26	L 1
68	February 23	@ Atlanta	L 118–120	Paul Silas (26)	Alexander Memorial Coliseum; 5,073	41–27	L 2
69	February 25	@ Chicago	L 107–115	Connie Hawkins (25)	Chicago Stadium; 9,720	41–28	L 3
70	February 26	@ Milwaukee	L 117–119 (OT)	Neal Walk (28)	Madison, WI; 9,371	41–29	L 4
71	February 27	@ Cleveland	W 127–125	Mo Layton (37)	Cleveland Arena; 6,889	42–29	W 1

March: 7–4 (home: 5–1; road: 2–3)

Game	Date	Team	Score	High points	Location Attendance	Record	Streak
72	March 1	Baltimore	L 90–95	Paul Silas (16)	Arizona Veterans Memorial Coliseum; 9,002	42–30	L 1
73	March 5	Buffalo	W 131–103	Neal Walk (26)	Arizona Veterans Memorial Coliseum; 6,729	43–30	W 1
74	March 7	@ Detroit	W 129–121	Connie Hawkins (28)	Cobo Arena; 2,014	44–30	W 2
75	March 8	@ Cincinnati	L 105–122	Neal Walk (18)	Cincinnati Gardens; 2,387	44–31	L 1
76	March 11	@ New York	W 110–106	Dick Van Arsdale (25)	Madison Square Garden; 19,588	45–31	W 1
77	March 15	Milwaukee	W 110–106	Connie Hawkins (27)	Arizona Veterans Memorial Coliseum; 11,090	46–31	W 2
78	March 17	New York	W 111–106	Charlie Scott (23)	Arizona Veterans Memorial Coliseum; 10,571	47–31	W 3
79	March 18	@ Golden State	L 116–134	Connie Hawkins (25)	Oakland–Alameda County Coliseum Arena; 9,399	47–32	L 1
80	March 21	Portland	W 160–128	Clem Haskins (28)	Arizona Veterans Memorial Coliseum; 8,045	48–32	W 1
81	March 24	@ Los Angeles	L 110–112	Charlie Scott (21)	The Forum; 17,505	48–33	L 1
82	March 25	Seattle	W 118–99	Charlie Scott (21)	Arizona Veterans Memorial Coliseum; 10,189	49–33	W 1

1971–72 schedule

== Awards and honors ==
=== All-Star ===
- Connie Hawkins was selected as a reserve for the Western Conference in the All-Star Game. It was his third consecutive All-Star selection.
- Paul Silas was selected as a reserve for the Western Conference in the All-Star Game. It was his first All-Star selection.

=== Season ===
- Paul Silas was named to the NBA All-Defensive Second Team.

== Player statistics ==
Legend
GP	Games played	MPG	Minutes per game
FG%	Field-goal percentage	FT%	Free-throw percentage
RPG	Rebounds per game	APG	Assists per game
PPG	Points per game

=== Season ===
Player	GP	MPG	FG%	FT%	RPG	APG	PPG
Mel Counts	76	11.9	.427	.721	3.4	1.3	5.2
Lamar Green	67	14.8	.446	.733	5.2	0.7	5.0
Art Harris	21	6.9	.329	.429	0.6	0.9	2.6
Clem Haskins	79	31.1	.483	.853^	3.4	3.7	15.7
Connie Hawkins	76	36.8	.459	.807	8.3	3.9	21.0
Mo Layton	80	23.1	.424	.739	2.1	3.1	9.1
Otto Moore	81	20.0	.436	.603	6.7	1.1	7.6
Charlie Scott*	6	29.5	.425	.810	3.8	4.3	18.8
Paul Silas	80	38.5	.470	.773	11.9	4.3	17.5
Fred Taylor*	13	5.3	.222	.308	1.3	0.5	1.2
Dick Van Arsdale	82	37.8	.463	.845^	4.1	3.6	19.7
Neal Walk	81	26.4	.479	.744	8.2	1.9	15.7
Jeff Webb*	27	4.8	.477	.500	0.6	0.6	2.5
John Wetzel	51	8.2	.378	.800	1.3	1.1	1.7

* – Stats with the Suns.
^ – Minimum 350 free throw attempts.

== Transactions ==
=== Trades ===
April 2, 1971	To Detroit Pistons 1972 first-round draft pick ( (United States) Bob Nash)	To Phoenix Suns (United States) Otto Moore
August 13, 1971	To Cleveland Cavaliers (United States) Greg Howard	To Phoenix Suns 1972 third-round draft pick ( (United States) Scott English) Future third-round draft pick
December 27, 1971	To Cincinnati Royals (United States) Fred Taylor	To Phoenix Suns 1973 third-round draft pick ( (United States) Joe Reaves)
March 14, 1971	To Boston Celtics Future considerations Cash considerations ( (United States) Paul Silas was sent to Boston in September to complete trade)	To Phoenix Suns Rights to (United States) Charlie Scott

=== Free agents ===
==== Additions ====
Date	Player	Contract	Former Team
January 4, 1972	Jeff Webb	Undisclosed	Milwaukee Bucks

==== Subtractions ====
Date	Player	Reason left	New team
September 21, 1971	Joe Thomas	Waived	n/a
