= 1971–72 Detroit Pistons season =

NBA team season

- Head coach: Butch van Breda Kolff (resigned); Terry Dischinger (interim); Earl Lloyd
- General manager: Ed Coil
- Owner: Fred Zollner
- Arena: Cobo Arena

Results
- Record: 26–56 (.317)
- Place: Division: 4th (Midwest); Conference: 8th (Western)
- Playoff finish: Did not qualify
- Stats at Basketball Reference

Local media
- Television: WJBK
- Radio: WXYZ

The 1971–72 Detroit Pistons season was the Detroit Pistons' 24th season in the NBA and 15th season in the city of Detroit. The team played at Cobo Arena in downtown Detroit.

The Pistons finished with a 26-56 (.317) record, 4th place in the Midwest Division. The team was led guards Dave Bing (22.6 ppg) and Jimmy Walker (21.3 ppg, NBA All-Star) and center Bob Lanier (25.7 ppg, 14.2 rpg, NBA All-Star). The season began with Butch van Breda Kolff as coach. He resigned 10 games into the season, replaced briefly by player Terry Dischinger before Earl Lloyd was named as a permanent replacement, as the team dropped from 45 wins the previous season to 26 in the 1971–72 season.

== Draft picks ==
Round	Pick	Player	Position	Nationality	College
1	11	Curtis Rowe	Forward	United States	UCLA
16	224	Isaiah Wilson	Guard	United States	Baltimore

== Roster ==
Detroit Pistons roster
Players

Pos.	No.	Player	Height	Weight	DOB	From
PG	21	Dave Bing	6 ft 3 in (1.91 m)	180 lb (82 kg)	1943-11-24	Syracuse
C	20	Jim Davis	6 ft 9 in (2.06 m)	225 lb (102 kg)	1941-12-18	Colorado
SF	43	Terry Dischinger	6 ft 7 in (2.01 m)	189 lb (86 kg)	1940-11-21	Purdue
PF	31	Bill Hewitt	6 ft 7 in (2.01 m)	210 lb (95 kg)	1944-08-08	USC
PG	30	Howard Komives	6 ft 1 in (1.85 m)	185 lb (84 kg)	1941-05-09	Bowling Green
C	16	Bob Lanier	6 ft 11 in (2.11 m)	250 lb (113 kg)	1948-09-10	St. Bonaventure
SG	26	Harvey Marlatt	6 ft 3 in (1.91 m)	185 lb (84 kg)	1948-08-26	Eastern Michigan
SF	23	Steve Mix	6 ft 7 in (2.01 m)	215 lb (98 kg)	1947-12-30	Toledo
PF	51	Erwin Mueller	6 ft 8 in (2.03 m)	230 lb (104 kg)	1944-03-12	San Francisco
SF	8	Willie Norwood	6 ft 7 in (2.01 m)	220 lb (100 kg)	1947-08-08	Alcorn State
SF	14	Bob Quick	6 ft 5 in (1.96 m)	215 lb (98 kg)	1946-03-05	Xavier
PF	18	Curtis Rowe	6 ft 7 in (2.01 m)	225 lb (102 kg)	1949-07-02	UCLA
SG	24	Jimmy Walker	6 ft 3 in (1.91 m)	195 lb (88 kg)	1944-04-08	Providence
SG	10	Isaiah Wilson	6 ft 2 in (1.88 m)	175 lb (79 kg)	1948-05-31	Baltimore

Coaches
Head coach
- Earl Lloyd

Legend
- (DP) Unsigned draft pick
- (FA) Free agent
- (S) Suspended
- Injured

Roster
Updated: December 10, 1971

== Regular season ==
=== Season standings ===
Midwest Division	W	L	PCT	GB	Home	Road	Neutral	Div
y-Milwaukee Bucks	63	19	.768	–	31–5	27–12	5–2	13–5
x-Chicago Bulls	57	25	.695	6	29–12	26–12	2–1	12–6
Phoenix Suns	49	33	.598	14	30–11	19–20	0–2	7–11
Detroit Pistons	26	56	.317	37	16–25	9–30	1–1	4–14

#	Western Conference			
#	Team	W	L	PCT
1	z-Los Angeles Lakers	69	13	.841
2	y-Milwaukee Bucks	63	19	.768
3	x-Chicago Bulls	57	25	.695
4	x-Golden State Warriors	51	31	.622
5	Phoenix Suns	49	33	.598
6	Seattle SuperSonics	47	35	.573
7	Houston Rockets	34	48	.415
8	Detroit Pistons	26	56	.317
9	Portland Trail Blazers	18	64	.220

z, y – division champions
x – clinched playoff spot

=== Game log ===
1971–72 Game log
#	Date	Opponent	Score	High points	Record
1	October 12	@ New York	91–84	Bob Lanier (29)	1–0
2	October 15	Los Angeles	132–103	Bob Lanier (25)	1–1
3	October 17	N Houston	99–112	Jimmy Walker (38)	2–1
4	October 19	@ Portland	101–99	Bob Lanier (44)	3–1
5	October 22	@ Phoenix	116–109	Jimmy Walker (37)	4–1
6	October 23	@ Golden State	109–115 (OT)	Jimmy Walker (28)	4–2
7	October 26	Houston	104–103	Bob Lanier (38)	4–3
8	October 27	@ Baltimore	98–128	Jimmy Walker (19)	4–4
9	October 29	Baltimore	105–119	Jimmy Walker (26)	5–4
10	October 30	@ Atlanta	104–99	Jimmy Walker (33)	6–4
11	November 5	@ Boston	102–103	Jimmy Walker (34)	6–5
12	November 6	@ Milwaukee	78–106	Bob Lanier (22)	6–6
13	November 10	Portland	122–139	Jimmy Walker (31)	7–6
14	November 12	@ Philadelphia	101–115	Bob Lanier (26)	7–7
15	November 13	@ New York	105–127	Jimmy Walker (24)	7–8
16	November 16	Golden State	122–101	Jimmy Walker (30)	7–9
17	November 18	Phoenix	126–128	Bob Lanier (37)	8–9
18	November 20	@ Buffalo	105–96	Jimmy Walker (35)	9–9
19	November 23	Milwaukee	112–104	Bob Lanier (28)	9–10
20	November 25	@ Phoenix	103–122	Howard Komives (17)	9–11
21	November 26	@ Los Angeles	113–132	Bob Lanier (29)	9–12
22	November 27	@ Seattle	102–124	Bob Lanier (26)	9–13
23	December 1	Atlanta	117–103	Jimmy Walker (27)	9–14
24	December 3	Houston	112–113	Jimmy Walker (32)	10–14
25	December 7	Portland	131–130 (OT)	Jimmy Walker (44)	10–15
26	December 9	Chicago	107–110	Bob Lanier (35)	11–15
27	December 10	@ Cleveland	111–112	Bob Lanier (35)	11–16
28	December 11	Philadelphia	118–111	Bob Lanier (26)	11–17
29	December 14	Seattle	103–86	Bob Lanier (35)	11–18
30	December 16	Cincinnati	101–107	Jimmy Walker (34)	12–18
31	December 17	@ Phoenix	102–123	Bob Lanier (20)	12–19
32	December 18	@ Golden State	102–129	Jimmy Walker (26)	12–20
33	December 19	@ Portland	113–114	Jimmy Walker (35)	12–21
34	December 21	@ Chicago	92–127	Jimmy Walker (22)	12–22
35	December 22	Cleveland	94–104	Bob Lanier (34)	13–22
36	December 25	Milwaukee	118–120 (OT)	Bob Lanier (35)	14–22
37	December 28	New York	119–100	Dave Bing (21)	14–23
38	December 30	Golden State	128–122	Dave Bing (30)	14–24
39	January 2	@ Houston	109–107	Jimmy Walker (26)	15–24
40	January 4	Philadelphia	131–127	Jimmy Walker (31)	15–25
41	January 5	@ Baltimore	89–111	Komives, Lanier (15)	15–26
42	January 7	Cincinnati	132–151	Bob Lanier (29)	16–26
43	January 8	@ Milwaukee	119–136	Bob Lanier (28)	16–27
44	January 9	Buffalo	96–101	Jimmy Walker (35)	17–27
45	January 11	Los Angeles	123–103	Bob Lanier (42)	17–28
46	January 14	@ Boston	94–108	Jimmy Walker (25)	17–29
47	January 15	Philadelphia	131–121	Bob Lanier (30)	17–30
48	January 21	Baltimore	102–107	Jimmy Walker (37)	18–30
49	January 23	Houston	109–107	Dave Bing (32)	18–31
50	January 26	Milwaukee	120–94	Dischinger, Lanier (15)	18–32
51	January 28	@ Atlanta	106–124	Dave Bing (20)	18–33
52	January 29	Boston	124–112	Jimmy Walker (30)	18–34
53	January 30	@ Chicago	99–109	Bob Lanier (24)	18–35
54	February 1	@ New York	106–115	Bob Lanier (42)	18–36
55	February 2	Cleveland	108–133	Dave Bing (33)	19–36
56	February 4	@ Philadelphia	118–113	Jim Davis (31)	20–36
57	February 5	@ Cincinnati	132–133 (OT)	Bob Lanier (38)	20–37
58	February 9	New York	126–102	Jimmy Walker (24)	20–38
59	February 11	@ Buffalo	88–95	Bob Lanier (31)	20–39
60	February 12	Buffalo	87–113	Willie Norwood (24)	21–39
61	February 13	@ Cleveland	136–121	Dave Bing (38)	22–39
62	February 15	Atlanta	113–105	Bob Lanier (28)	22–40
63	February 18	Chicago	122–97	Bob Lanier (26)	22–41
64	February 20	Phoenix	121–107	Dave Bing (25)	22–42
65	February 22	@ Los Angeles	135–134 (OT)	Dave Bing (33)	23–42
66	February 23	@ Seattle	96–97	Bob Lanier (31)	23–43
67	February 24	@ Golden State	106–116	Bob Lanier (26)	23–44
68	February 26	@ Houston	106–122	Bob Lanier (28)	23–45
69	February 29	@ Milwaukee	113–131	Bob Lanier (35)	23–46
70	March 1	Seattle	116–102	Bob Lanier (32)	23–47
71	March 3	Boston	125–96	Bob Lanier (32)	23–48
72	March 7	Phoenix	129–121	Bob Lanier (42)	23–49
73	March 12	N Baltimore	97–102	Curtis Rowe (28)	23–50
74	March 14	Los Angeles	129–116	Bob Lanier (35)	23–51
75	March 17	Atlanta	112–121	Bob Lanier (32)	24–51
76	March 18	@ Buffalo	103–116	Bob Lanier (37)	24–52
77	March 19	Chicago	115–107	Bing, Lanier (25)	24–53
78	March 21	Cincinnati	117–120	Bob Lanier (33)	25–53
79	March 22	@ Cincinnati	130–135	Bob Lanier (31)	25–54
80	March 24	Buffalo	105–112	Dave Bing (27)	26–54
81	March 25	@ Chicago	105–121	Jimmy Walker (23)	26–55
82	March 26	@ Boston	120–133	Dave Bing (24)	26–56

== See also ==
- 1972 in Michigan
