= 1971–72 Houston Rockets season =

- Head coach: Tex Winter
- General manager: Pete Newell
- Owners: Wayne Duddlesten; Billy Goldberg; Mickey Herskowitz
- Arena: Hofheinz Pavilion; Astrodome

Results
- Record: 34–48 (.415)
- Place: Division: 4th (Pacific); Conference: 7th (Western)
- Playoff finish: Did not qualify
- Stats at Basketball Reference

Local media
- Television: KHTV
- Radio: KPRC

The 1971–72 Houston Rockets season was the Rockets' 5th season in the NBA and 1st season in the city of Houston following their relocation from San Diego, where the franchise played its first four seasons prior to moving to becoming the first NBA franchise in Texas.

== Roster ==
1971–72 Houston Rockets roster
Players

Pos.	No.	Player	Height	Weight	DOB	From
C	34	Dick Cunningham	6 ft 10 in (2.08 m)	245 lb (111 kg)	1946-07-11	Murray State
PG	21	Johnny Egan	5 ft 11 in (1.80 m)	180 lb (82 kg)	1939-01-31	Providence
SF	40	Dick Gibbs	6 ft 5 in (1.96 m)	210 lb (95 kg)	1948-12-20	UTEP
C	44	Elvin Hayes	6 ft 9 in (2.06 m)	235 lb (107 kg)	1945-11-17	Houston
SG	22	Stu Lantz	6 ft 3 in (1.91 m)	175 lb (79 kg)	1946-07-13	Nebraska
SF	18	McCoy McLemore	6 ft 7 in (2.01 m)	230 lb (104 kg)	1942-04-03	Drake
PF	25	Cliff Meely	6 ft 8 in (2.03 m)	215 lb (98 kg)	1947-07-10	Colorado
PG	23	Calvin Murphy	5 ft 9 in (1.75 m)	165 lb (75 kg)	1948-05-09	Niagara
SG	14	Mike Newlin	6 ft 4 in (1.93 m)	200 lb (91 kg)	1949-01-02	Utah
SF	4	Greg Smith	6 ft 5 in (1.96 m)	195 lb (88 kg)	1947-01-28	Western Kentucky
PF	45	Rudy Tomjanovich	6 ft 8 in (2.03 m)	218 lb (99 kg)	1948-11-24	Michigan
SG	33	John Vallely	6 ft 3 in (1.91 m)	185 lb (84 kg)	1948-10-03	UCLA

Coaches
Head coach
- Tex Winter
Assistant(s)
- Frank Hamblen

Legend
- (DP) Unsigned draft pick
- (FA) Free agent
- (S) Suspended
- Injured

Roster
Updated: December 16, 1971

== Regular season ==
=== Season standings ===
Pacific Division	W	L	PCT	GB	Home	Road	Neutral	Div
y-Los Angeles Lakers	69	13	.841	–	36–5	31–7	2–1	21–3
x-Golden State Warriors	51	31	.622	18	27–8	21–20	3–3	14–10
Seattle SuperSonics	47	35	.573	22	28–12	18–22	1–1	12–12
Houston Rockets	34	48	.415	35	15–20	14–23	5–5	9–15
Portland Trail Blazers	18	64	.220	51	14–26	4–35	0–3	4–20

#	Western Conference			
#	Team	W	L	PCT
1	z-Los Angeles Lakers	69	13	.841
2	y-Milwaukee Bucks	63	19	.768
3	x-Chicago Bulls	57	25	.695
4	x-Golden State Warriors	51	31	.622
5	Phoenix Suns	49	33	.598
6	Seattle SuperSonics	47	35	.573
7	Houston Rockets	34	48	.415
8	Detroit Pistons	26	56	.317
9	Portland Trail Blazers	18	64	.220

=== Game log ===
1971–72 Game log
#	Date	Opponent	Score	High points	Record
1	October 14	Philadelphia	105–94	Rudy Tomjanovich (28)	0–1
2	October 16	@ Phoenix	108–128	Elvin Hayes (26)	0–2
3	October 17	N Detroit	99–112	Calvin Murphy (26)	0–3
4	October 20	N Chicago	110–125	Stu Lantz (33)	0–4
5	October 22	@ Seattle	91–110	Rudy Tomjanovich (18)	0–5
6	October 24	Los Angeles	113–103	Elvin Hayes (35)	0–6
7	October 26	@ Detroit	104–103	Elvin Hayes (30)	1–6
8	October 27	@ Boston	97–108	Rudy Tomjanovich (25)	1–7
9	October 28	@ New York	94–112	Calvin Murphy (21)	1–8
10	October 31	Buffalo	87–102	Cliff Meely (19)	2–8
11	November 3	New York	117–98	Rudy Tomjanovich (26)	2–9
12	November 4	Portland	112–110	Elvin Hayes (28)	2–10
13	November 7	Baltimore	109–106	Elvin Hayes (38)	2–11
14	November 9	@ Golden State	99–115	Stu Lantz (30)	2–12
15	November 10	Boston	142–103	Elvin Hayes (30)	2–13
16	November 12	@ Milwaukee	102–111	Stu Lantz (26)	2–14
17	November 13	@ Chicago	102–111	Elvin Hayes (33)	2–15
18	November 16	@ Baltimore	107–110	Elvin Hayes (31)	2–16
19	November 17	@ Philadelphia	118–112	Elvin Hayes (33)	3–16
20	November 19	@ Los Angeles	99–106	Elvin Hayes (26)	3–17
21	November 21	N Golden State	115–96	Mike Newlin (31)	4–17
22	November 24	Philadelphia	108–109	Hayes, Tomjanovich (27)	5–17
23	November 28	Phoenix	116–110	Elvin Hayes (30)	5–18
24	November 30	@ Buffalo	115–101	Lantz, Murphy (18)	6–18
25	December 1	@ Cleveland	106–116	Lantz, Murphy (24)	6–19
26	December 3	@ Detroit	112–113	Elvin Hayes (35)	6–20
27	December 4	@ Boston	107–117	Elvin Hayes (28)	6–21
28	December 8	Los Angeles	125–120	Elvin Hayes (31)	6–22
29	December 10	Atlanta	88–95	Stu Lantz (28)	7–22
30	December 11	@ Phoenix	111–110	Hayes, Murphy (24)	8–22
31	December 12	Seattle	98–100	Elvin Hayes (34)	9–22
32	December 14	@ Milwaukee	98–106	Cliff Meely (20)	9–23
33	December 15	@ Atlanta	117–115 (OT)	Stu Lantz (30)	10–23
34	December 17	@ Chicago	109–98	Stu Lantz (31)	11–23
35	December 18	@ Cincinnati	126–116	Elvin Hayes (29)	12–23
36	December 21	@ Portland	132–119	Elvin Hayes (44)	13–23
37	December 26	@ Los Angeles	115–137	Elvin Hayes (33)	13–24
38	December 29	Phoenix	124–106	Stu Lantz (19)	13–25
39	December 30	Atlanta	115–129	Elvin Hayes (42)	14–25
40	January 2	Detroit	109–107	Elvin Hayes (26)	14–26
41	January 4	Seattle	110–119	Calvin Murphy (28)	15–26
42	January 5	Boston	113–105	Elvin Hayes (25)	15–27
43	January 9	Golden State	113–112	Calvin Murphy (25)	15–28
44	January 11	@ Seattle	126–141	Elvin Hayes (42)	15–29
45	January 15	Cleveland	109–112	Elvin Hayes (30)	16–29
46	January 16	New York	109–108	Elvin Hayes (24)	16–30
47	January 20	@ Cincinnati	104–87	Elvin Hayes (27)	17–30
48	January 21	@ Boston	105–110	Rudy Tomjanovich (25)	17–31
49	January 22	@ Chicago	108–115	Elvin Hayes (23)	17–32
50	January 23	@ Detroit	109–107	Stu Lantz (32)	18–32
51	January 25	Portland	104–118	Elvin Hayes (27)	19–32
52	January 26	N Chicago	108–117	Elvin Hayes (36)	19–33
53	January 28	@ Los Angeles	105–118	Elvin Hayes (33)	19–34
54	February 2	N Seattle	88–111	Greg Smith (23)	20–34
55	February 4	@ Portland	113–114	Elvin Hayes (28)	20–35
56	February 5	Milwaukee	119–112	Stu Lantz (30)	20–36
57	February 6	Atlanta	113–120	Calvin Murphy (27)	21–36
58	February 8	N Seattle	127–119	Elvin Hayes (31)	21–37
59	February 11	Baltimore	95–116	Calvin Murphy (28)	22–37
60	February 13	Cincinnati	111–112	Calvin Murphy (31)	23–37
61	February 14	@ Philadelphia	130–116	Elvin Hayes (28)	24–37
62	February 15	@ Baltimore	98–113	Elvin Hayes (31)	24–38
63	February 16	@ New York	100–110	Elvin Hayes (26)	24–39
64	February 18	@ Buffalo	108–96	Elvin Hayes (27)	25–39
65	February 23	N Los Angeles	110–115	Elvin Hayes (33)	26–39
66	February 26	Detroit	106–122	Elvin Hayes (36)	27–39
67	February 27	Golden State	117–104	Elvin Hayes (33)	27–40
68	March 1	N Cincinnati	108–96	Hayes, Lantz (26)	28–40
69	March 3	N Golden State	107–108	Rudy Tomjanovich (26)	28–41
70	March 4	Cleveland	130–123	Stu Lantz (31)	28–42
71	March 5	Chicago	128–97	Calvin Murphy (28)	28–43
72	March 9	N Portland	111–114	Rudy Tomjanovich (29)	29–43
73	March 10	Golden State	119–116	Calvin Murphy (35)	29–44
74	March 11	Buffalo	100–121	Stu Lantz (29)	30–44
75	March 12	Philadelphia	112–121	Rudy Tomjanovich (33)	31–44
76	March 16	New York	103–102	Elvin Hayes (37)	31–45
77	March 18	Milwaukee	120–116 (OT)	Elvin Hayes (39)	31–46
78	March 21	@ Milwaukee	94–111	Calvin Murphy (21)	31–47
79	March 22	@ Atlanta	106–107	Stu Lantz (29)	31–48
80	March 24	@ Cleveland	127–119	Rudy Tomjanovich (35)	32–48
81	March 25	@ Baltimore	106–85	Calvin Murphy (27)	33–48
82	March 26	Portland	109–131	Elvin Hayes (30)	34–48
