= Mo Layton =

American basketball player (born 1948)

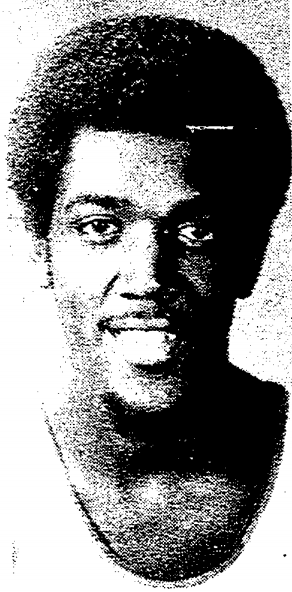

Personal information
- Born: December 24, 1948 (age 77) Newark, New Jersey, U.S.
- Listed height: 6 ft 1 in (1.85 m)
- Listed weight: 180 lb (82 kg)

Career information
- High school: Weequahic (Newark, New Jersey)
- College: Phoenix College (1967–1969); USC (1969–1971)
- NBA draft: 1971: 3rd round, 48th overall pick
- Drafted by: Phoenix Suns
- Playing career: 1971–1978
- Position: Point guard
- Number: 1, 12, 24, 35

Career history
- 1971–1973: Phoenix Suns
- 1973: Portland Trail Blazers
- 1973–1974: Memphis Tams
- 1976–1977: New York Knicks
- 1977–1978: San Antonio Spurs

Career highlights
- Second-team All-American – USBWA (1971); Second-team All-Pac-8 (1971)

Career statistics
- Points: 1,845 (6.9 ppg)
- Rebounds: 357 (1.3 rpg)
- Assists: 706 (2.6 apg)
- Stats at NBA.com
- Stats at Basketball Reference

Dennis "Mo" Layton (born December 24, 1948) is an American former professional basketball player.

A 6'1" point guard from USC, Layton played five seasons (1971–1974, 1976–1978) in the National Basketball Association and American Basketball Association. His most productive season was his rookie year in 1971–72 with the Phoenix Suns, when he averaged 9.1 points, 3.1 assists and 2.1 rebounds in 23.1 minutes a game. Layton was waived by the Suns after two seasons, then signed with the Portland Trail Blazers, appearing in 22 games before being waived. He then signed with the Memphis Tams of the ABA, where he appeared in only 3 games. He would later sign with the Detroit Pistons prior to the 1974–75 NBA season, and again with the Suns prior to the 1975–76 NBA season, but was waived by both teams before the start of the respective season. Layton would return to the NBA in the 1976–77 and 1977–78 seasons, playing with the New York Knicks and the San Antonio Spurs, respectively. He was waived by the Spurs on October 2, 1978.

== Statistics ==
Legend
| GP | Games played | MPG | Minutes per game |
| FG% | Field-goal percentage | FT% | Free-throw percentage |
| RPG | Rebounds per game | APG | Assists per game |
| SPG | Steals per game | BPG | Blocks per game |
| PPG | Points per game | **Bold** | Career high |

=== Regular season ===
| Year | Team | GP | MPG | FG% | FT% | RPG | APG | SPG | BPG | PPG |
|---|---|---|---|---|---|---|---|---|---|---|
| 1971–72 | Phoenix | **80** | **23.1** | .424 | .739 | **2.1** | **3.1** | | | **9.1** |
| 1972–73 | Phoenix | 65 | 15.2 | .431 | .756 | 1.2 | 2.1 | | | 7.1 |
| 1973–74 | Portland | 22 | 14.9 | .491 | .538 | 1.5 | 2.3 | .4 | .0 | 5.6 |
| 1973–74 | Memphis | 3 | 21.7 | .471 | **1.000** | 1.3 | 2.3 | .0 | **.3** | 6.3 |
| 1976–77 | New York | 56 | 13.7 | .484 | .795 | 0.8 | 2.8 | .4 | .1 | 5.8 |
| 1977–78 | San Antonio | 41 | 12.1 | **.506** | .923 | 0.8 | 2.6 | **.5** | .1 | 4.4 |
| Career | | 267 | 16.8 | .448 | .749 | 1.3 | 2.6 | .4 | .1 | 6.9 |
