= 1971–72 Los Angeles Lakers season =

Pro basketball team season (won NBA championship)

- NBA champions
- Conference champions
- Division champions
- Head coach: Bill Sharman
- Owners: Jack Kent Cooke
- Arena: The Forum

Results
- Record: 69–13 (.841)
- Place: Division: 1st (Pacific); Conference: 1st (Western)
- Playoff finish: NBA champions (Defeated Knicks 4–1)
- Stats at Basketball Reference

Local media
- Television: KTLA
- Radio: KABC

During the 1971–72 season, the Los Angeles Lakers won their first National Basketball Association (NBA) title since moving to Los Angeles. The Lakers defeated the New York Knicks in five games to win the title, after going 69–13 during the regular-season, a record that stood for 24 seasons until the 1995–96 Chicago Bulls went 72–10. During the regular season, they would also go on an NBA record 33-game winning streak. The team went on to win 81 regular season and playoff games overall, a record that would stand alone for 14 years until the Boston Celtics matched it in 1986. Widely regarded as one of the greatest basketball teams of all time, the 1971–72 Lakers were named as one of the Top 10 Teams in NBA History in 1996.

The Lakers defeated the Chicago Bulls in 4 games in the Western Conference Semifinals. The team then defeated the Milwaukee Bucks in a 6-game Western Conference Finals. The Lakers then got to the NBA Finals once again for the 14th time in league history. They faced the New York Knicks in a rematch of the 1970 NBA Finals. The Knicks were defeated in 5 games, the Lakers claimed their sixth title in team history and the first since 1954. Wilt Chamberlain won Finals MVP. Their record of outscoring opponents by 12.3 points per game in the regular season would eventually be broken by the 2024-25 Oklahoma City Thunder, at 12.9 points per game.

== Offseason ==
- Traded a 1971 2nd round draft pick to the Cincinnati Royals for guard Flynn Robinson.
- Hired Bill Sharman as the new head coach to replace Joe Mullaney.
- Traded a 1972 2nd round draft pick to the Portland Trail Blazers for center Leroy Ellis.
- Claimed forward John Q. Trapp off waivers from the Houston Rockets.

=== NBA draft ===
Round	Pick	Player	Position	Nationality	School/Club team
1	13	Jim Cleamons	Guard	United States	Ohio State
4	64	Roger Brown	Center	United States	Kansas
5	81	Lee Dedmon	Forward	United States	UNC

== Roster ==
1971–72 Los Angeles Lakers roster
Players

Pos.	No.	Player	Height	Weight	DOB	From
F	22	Elgin Baylor	6 ft 5 in (1.96 m)	225 lb (102 kg)	1934-09-16	Seattle
C	13	Wilt Chamberlain	7 ft 1 in (2.16 m)	275 lb (125 kg)	1936-08-21	Kansas
G	11	Jim Cleamons	6 ft 3 in (1.91 m)	185 lb (84 kg)	1949-09-13	Ohio State
C	14	Leroy Ellis	6 ft 10 in (2.08 m)	210 lb (95 kg)	1940-03-10	St. John's
F	24	Keith Erickson	6 ft 5 in (1.96 m)	195 lb (88 kg)	1944-04-19	UCLA
G	25	Gail Goodrich	6 ft 1 in (1.85 m)	170 lb (77 kg)	1943-04-23	UCLA
F	52	Happy Hairston	6 ft 7 in (2.01 m)	255 lb (116 kg)	1942-05-31	NYU
F	5	Jim McMillian	6 ft 5 in (1.96 m)	225 lb (102 kg)	1948-03-11	Columbia
G	12	Pat Riley	6 ft 4 in (1.93 m)	205 lb (93 kg)	1945-03-20	Kentucky
G	21	Flynn Robinson	6 ft 1 in (1.85 m)	185 lb (84 kg)	1941-04-28	Wyoming
F	31	John Q. Trapp	6 ft 7 in (2.01 m)	210 lb (95 kg)	1945-10-02	UNLV
G	44	Jerry West	6 ft 2 in (1.88 m)	175 lb (79 kg)	1938-05-28	West Virginia

Coaches
Head coach
- Bill Sharman

Legend
- (DP) Unsigned draft pick
- (FA) Free agent
- (S) Suspended
- Injured

Roster
Updated: 2013-03-22

== Regular season ==
Since moving to Los Angeles, the Lakers were repeatedly foiled by the Boston Celtics in their attempts to capture an NBA title. The Lakers lost the championship to them six times in eight years. In 1970, with the aging Celtics out of title contention, the Lakers lost in the NBA finals to the New York Knicks. In 1971, after losing Jerry West to a season-ending injury in February, they lost in the Western Conference finals to the powerful Milwaukee Bucks.

Going into the 1971–72 season, many experts thought the chance at a championship had passed for this aging team. Star players Wilt Chamberlain, Elgin Baylor, and Jerry West were all in their 30s, and had all missed significant time due to injuries in the prior two seasons. The defending champion Milwaukee Bucks, led by superstar Kareem Abdul-Jabbar, appeared to be starting a new NBA dynasty. But new coach Bill Sharman still believed the Lakers had the talent to contend. He introduced strict conditioning drills and implemented a running fast break-based offense. He re-tooled Wilt Chamberlain's game to focus on defense, rebounding, and jump-starting the fast break with quick outlet passes to guards Jerry West and Gail Goodrich. The only casualty of this system was the aging Baylor, who could not physically handle the up-tempo practices and offense and retired 9 games into the season. He was replaced at small forward by Jim McMillian who played at a near all-star level.

Shortly thereafter, the Lakers strung together a record 33-game win streak. The streak ended on January 9, 1972, against the Milwaukee Bucks. The Lakers and Bucks then staged a season-long race for the league's best record, with the Lakers setting a then NBA record with 69 wins (the Bucks had the second-best record at 63–19).

=== Season standings ===
Pacific Division	W	L	PCT	GB	Home	Road	Neutral	Div
y-Los Angeles Lakers	69	13	.841	–	36–5	31–7	2–1	21–3
x-Golden State Warriors	51	31	.622	18	27–8	21–20	3–3	14–10
Seattle SuperSonics	47	35	.573	22	28–12	18–22	1–1	12–12
Houston Rockets	34	48	.415	35	15–20	14–23	5–5	9–15
Portland Trail Blazers	18	64	.220	51	14–26	4–35	0–3	4–20

#	Western Conference			
#	Team	W	L	PCT
1	z-Los Angeles Lakers	69	13	.841
2	y-Milwaukee Bucks	63	19	.768
3	x-Chicago Bulls	57	25	.695
4	x-Golden State Warriors	51	31	.622
5	Phoenix Suns	49	33	.598
6	Seattle SuperSonics	47	35	.573
7	Houston Rockets	34	48	.415
8	Detroit Pistons	26	56	.317
9	Portland Trail Blazers	18	64	.220

z – clinched division title
y – clinched division title
x – clinched playoff spot

== Game logs ==
=== Regular season ===
1971–72 game log
Total: 69–13 (Home: 36–5; Road: 33–8)
October: 6–3 (home: 1–2; road: 5–1)

Game	Date	Team	Score	High points	High rebounds	High assists	Location Attendance	Record
1	October 15	@ Detroit	132–103	Wilt Chamberlain (26)	Wilt Chamberlain (15)	Jerry West (9)	Cobo Arena; 10,613	1–0
2	October 16	@ New York	W 119–104	McMillian (28)	Chamberlain (19)	West (6)	Madison Square Garden; 19,296	2–0
3	October 19	@ Buffalo	123–106	Gail Goodrich (24)	Wilt Chamberlain (12)	Gail Goodrich (6)	Buffalo Memorial Auditorium; 9,127	3–0
4	October 20	@ Atlanta	W 126–104	McMillian (39)	Chamberlain (25)	McMillian (6)	Alexander Memorial Coliseum; 5,543	4–0
5	October 22	Chicago	L 106–113	Goodrich (26)	Chamberlain (18)	Hairston (6)	The Forum; 15,086	4–1
6	October 24	@ Houston	113–103	Gail Goodrich (31)	Chamberlain, Hairston (13)	Gail Goodrich (6)	Hofheinz Pavilion; 4,061	5–1
7	October 29	Cincinnati	107–119	Gail Goodrich (31)	Wilt Chamberlain (32)	Jim McMillian (7)	The Forum; 12,442	6–1
8	October 30	@ Seattle	106–115	Flynn Robinson (28)	Happy Hairston (13)	Gail Goodrich (7)	Seattle Center Coliseum; 13,138	6–2
9	October 31	Golden State	109–105	Gail Goodrich (38)	Wilt Chamberlain (24)	Wilt Chamberlain (6)	The Forum; 11,303	6–3

November : 14–0 (home: 9–0; road: 5–0)

Game	Date	Team	Score	High points	High rebounds	High assists	Location Attendance	Record
10	November 5	Baltimore	W 110–106	Goodrich (31)	Chamberlain (25)	Chamberlain, West (6)	The Forum; 11,168	7–3
11	November 6	@ Golden State	105–89	Jerry West (28)	Wilt Chamberlain (17)	Jerry West (8)	Oakland-Alameda County Coliseum Arena; 10,625	8–3
12	November 7	New York	W 103–96	West (29)	Chamberlain (22)	West (8)	The Forum; 15,397	9–3
13	November 9	@ Chicago	W 122–109	McMillian (28)	Chamberlain (20)	West (13)	Chicago Stadium; 9,082	10–3
14	November 10	@ Philadelphia	143–103	Gail Goodrich (34)	Wilt Chamberlain (14)	Jerry West (10)	Spectrum; 9,503	11–3
15	November 12	Seattle	107–115	Jerry West (28)	Wilt Chamberlain (22)	Jerry West (8)	The Forum; 16,550	12–3
16	November 13	@ Portland	130–108	LeRoy Ellis (27)	Wilt Chamberlain (13)	Jerry West (11)	Memorial Coliseum; 9,990	13–3
17	November 14	Boston	W 128–115	Goodrich (36)	Chamberlain (31)	Chamberlain (10)	The Forum; 17,505	14–3
18	November 16	Cleveland	90–108	Jerry West (25)	Wilt Chamberlain (15)	Wilt Chamberlain (6)	The Forum; 10,475	15–3
19	November 19	Houston	99–106	Gail Goodrich (32)	Wilt Chamberlain (23)	Chamberlain, Goodrich, West (6)	The Forum; 11,484	16–3
20	November 21	Milwaukee	W 112–105	Goodrich (27)	Chamberlain (26)	West (13)	The Forum; 17,505	17–3
21	November 25	@ Seattle	139–115	Jerry West (26)	Wilt Chamberlain (15)	Jerry West (13)	Seattle Center Coliseum; 13,170	18–3
22	November 26	Detroit	113–132	Wilt Chamberlain (31)	Wilt Chamberlain (31)	Jerry West (18)	The Forum; 17,101	19–3
23	November 28	Seattle	111–138	Jerry West (25)	Wilt Chamberlain (26)	Jerry West (8)	The Forum; 15,544	20–3

December : 16–0 (home: 7–0; road: 9–0)

Game	Date	Team	Score	High points	High rebounds	High assists	Location Attendance	Record
24	December 1	@ Boston	W 124–111	West (45)	Chamberlain (20)	Chamberlain (6)	Boston Garden; 8,584	21–3
25	December 3	@ Philadelphia	131–116	Jim McMillian (41)	Wilt Chamberlain (25)	Jerry West (9)	Spectrum; 14,923	22–3
26	December 5	Portland	107–123	Hairston, West (20)	Wilt Chamberlain (27)	Jerry West (10)	The Forum; 17,505	23–3
27	December 8	@ Houston	125–120	Gail Goodrich (42)	Happy Hairston (15)	Jerry West (6)	Hofheinz Pavilion; 9,346	24–3
28	December 9	@ Golden State	124–111	Jerry West (38)	Wilt Chamberlain (15)	Jerry West (11)	Oakland-Alameda County Coliseum Arena; 8,892	25–3
29	December 10	Phoenix	117–126 (OT)	Gail Goodrich (32)	Wilt Chamberlain (28)	Jerry West (11)	The Forum; 17,505	26–3
30	December 12	Atlanta	W 104–95	Gail Goodrich (32)	Chamberlain (24)	West (14)	The Forum; 17,505	27–3
31	December 14	@ Portland	129–114	Chamberlain, Goodrich (24)	Wilt Chamberlain (18)	Jerry West (15)	Memorial Coliseum; 9,048	28–3
32	December 17	Golden State	99–129	Gail Goodrich (25)	Wilt Chamberlain (18)	Jerry West (9)	The Forum; 15,552	29–3
33	December 18	@ Phoenix	132–106	Gail Goodrich (28)	Wilt Chamberlain (16)	Jerry West (7)	Arizona Veterans Memorial Coliseum; 12,534	30–3
34	December 19	Philadelphia	132–154	Wilt Chamberlain (32)	Wilt Chamberlain (34)	Jerry West (10)	The Forum; 17,505	31–3
35	December 21	@ Buffalo	117–103	Jerry West (33)	Wilt Chamberlain (22)	Jerry West (10)	Buffalo Memorial Auditorium; 10,602	32–3
36	December 22	@ Baltimore	W 127–120	West (37)	Hairston (17)	West (9)	Baltimore Civic Center; 8,468	33–3
37	December 26	Houston	115–137	Jerry West (34)	Happy Hairston (21)	Jerry West (17)	The Forum; 17,505	34–3
38	December 28	Buffalo	87–105	Jerry West (24)	Happy Hairston (14)	Jerry West (8)	The Forum; 17,505	35–3
39	December 30	@ Seattle	122–106	Jim McMillian (34)	Wilt Chamberlain (24)	Jerry West (11)	Seattle Center Coliseum; 13,106	36–3

January : 8–4 (home: 4–1; road: 4–3)

Game	Date	Team	Score	High points	High rebounds	High assists	Location Attendance	Record
40	January 2	Boston	W 122–113	Goodrich (40)	Hairston (19)	West (12)	The Forum; 17,505	37–3
41	January 5	@ Cleveland	113–103	Jim McMillian (29)	Happy Hairston (19)	Jerry West (14)	Cleveland Arena; 11,178	38–3
42	January 7	@ Atlanta	W 134–90	Jim McMillian (26)	Chamberlain, Hairston (14)	West (13)	Alexander Memorial Coliseum; 7,192	39–3
43	January 9	@ Milwaukee	L 104–120	West (20)	Hairston (18)	West (6)	MECCA Arena; 10,746	39–4
44	January 11	@ Detroit	123–103	Wilt Chamberlain (29)	Wilt Chamberlain (18)	Jerry West (9)	Cobo Arena; 10,050	40–4
45	January 12	@ Cincinnati	107–108	Wilt Chamberlain (24)	Happy Hairston (23)	Jerry West (7)	Cincinnati Gardens; 5,231	40–5
46	January 14	@ Philadelphia	135–121	Jerry West (30)	Wilt Chamberlain (20)	Jerry West (13)	Spectrum; 12,919	41–5
All-Star Break
47	January 21	New York	L 101–104	Chamberlain (28)	Chamberlain (19)	West (8)	The Forum; 17,505	41–6
48	January 22	@ Phoenix	102–116	Jerry West (26)	Wilt Chamberlain (20)	Jerry West (8)	Arizona Veterans Memorial Coliseum; 12,534	41–7
49	January 25	Phoenix	119–129	Gail Goodrich (33)	Wilt Chamberlain (18)	Jerry West (7)	The Forum; 17,505	42–7
50	January 28	Houston	105–118	Gail Goodrich (28)	Chamberlain, Hairston (18)	Jerry West (9)	The Forum; 16,183	43–7
51	January 30	Portland	131–153	Gail Goodrich (29)	Wilt Chamberlain (24)	Jerry West (14)	The Forum; 17,007	44–7

February : 12–3 (home: 7–1; road: 5–2)

Game	Date	Team	Score	High points	High rebounds	High assists	Location Attendance	Record
52	February 4	Milwaukee	W 118–105	West (37)	Chamberlain (25)	West (13)	The Forum; 17,505	45–7
53	February 5	@ Golden State	108–96	Gail Goodrich (30)	Wilt Chamberlain (22)	Jerry West (14)	Oakland-Alameda County Coliseum Arena; 13,502	46–7
54	February 6	Baltimore	W 151–127	Trapp (27)	Hairston (13)	West (10)	The Forum; 17,103	47–7
55	February 8	@ New York	W 107–102	Goodrich (36)	Chamberlain (20)	West (7)	Madison Square Garden; 19,588	48–7
56	February 9	@ Atlanta	W 117–113	West (31)	Hairston (11)	Goodrich, West (4)	Alexander Memorial Coliseum; 7,192	49–7
57	February 11	@ Boston	L 108–121	West (25)	McMillian (10)	West (11)	Boston Garden; 15,315	49–8
58	February 13	N Baltimore (at College Park, MD)	W 121–110	McMillian (31)	Hairston (20)	West (11)	Cole Field House; 14,239	50–8
59	February 15	Cincinnati	118–125	Gail Goodrich (33)	Wilt Chamberlain (19)	Jerry West (13)	The Forum; 15,161	51–8
60	February 16	@ Phoenix	109–110	McMillian, West (26)	Wilt Chamberlain (21)	Jerry West (8)	Arizona Veterans Memorial Coliseum; 12,534	51–9
61	February 18	Portland	114–125	Gail Goodrich (34)	Happy Hairston (19)	Jerry West (10)	The Forum; 15,357	52–9
62	February 19	@ Portland	115–94	Happy Hairston (21)	Wilt Chamberlain (19)	Jerry West (12)	Memorial Coliseum; 11,903	53–9
63	February 20	Boston	W 132–113	West (39)	Chamberlain (30)	West (9)	The Forum; 17,505	54–9
64	February 22	Detroit	135–134 (OT)	Jerry West (37)	Wilt Chamberlain (21)	Jerry West (12)	The Forum; 14,245	54–10
65	February 23	N Houston	110–115	Jerry West (36)	Wilt Chamberlain (14)	Goodrich, West (6)	Heart O' Texas Fair Complex; 7,621	54–11
66	February 25	Cincinnati	88–109	Gail Goodrich (25)	Wilt Chamberlain (14)	Jerry West (7)	The Forum; 17,036	55–11
67	February 27	Chicago	W 123–118 (OT)	West (36)	Chamberlain (23)	West (12)	The Forum; 17,505	56–11
68	February 29	@ New York	W 114–111	West (32)	Chamberlain (19)	West (7)	Madison Square Garden; 19,588	57–11

March : 11–2 (home: 8–1; road: 3–1)

Game	Date	Team	Score	High points	High rebounds	High assists	Location Attendance	Record
69	March 1	N Milwaukee (at Madison, WI)	W 109–108	West (28)	Hairston (20)	West (6)	Wisconsin Field House; 9,227	58–11
70	March 3	Atlanta	W 114–104	Goodrich (33)	Hairston (25)	Chamberlain, West (7)	The Forum; 17,282	59–11
71	March 5	Baltimore	L 94–108	West (25)	Hairston (27)	West (6)	The Forum; 17,505	59–12
72	March 7	Philadelphia	97–114	Gail Goodrich (25)	Wilt Chamberlain (18)	Jerry West (7)	The Forum; 17,505	60–12
73	March 10	Cleveland	98–132	Gail Goodrich (30)	Wilt Chamberlain (18)	Jerry West (8)	The Forum; 14,861	61–12
74	March 12	Buffalo	102–141	Hairston, McMillian (23)	Wilt Chamberlain (17)	Erickson, West (8)	The Forum; 14,090	62–12
75	March 14	@ Detroit	129–116	Jim McMillian (30)	Wilt Chamberlain (14)	Jerry West (14)	Cobo Arena; 5,982	63–12
76	March 15	@ Cincinnati	121–116	Jerry West (32)	Wilt Chamberlain (24)	Jerry West (16)	Cincinnati Gardens; 5,516	64–12
77	March 17	Milwaukee	W 123–107	McMillian (27)	Chamberlain (24)	West (10)	The Forum; 17,505	65–12
78	March 19	Golden State	99–162	Gail Goodrich (30)	Happy Hairston (20)	Jerry West (13)	The Forum; 17,505	66–12
79	March 21	@ Chicago	W 109–104	Goodrich (29)	Chamberlain (29)	West (11)	Chicago Stadium; 17,729	67–12
80	March 22	@ Cleveland	120–124	Goodrich, West (31)	Wilt Chamberlain (19)	Jerry West (12)	Cleveland Arena; 10,819	67–13
81	March 24	Phoenix	110–112	Gail Goodrich (36)	Wilt Chamberlain (19)	Jerry West (10)	The Forum; 17,505	68–13
82	March 26	Seattle	98–124	Gail Goodrich (24)	Wilt Chamberlain (23)	Jerry West (11)	The Forum; 17,505	69–13

1971–72 schedule

=== Playoffs ===
1972 playoff game log
Western Conference Semifinals: 4–0 (home: 2–0; road: 2–0)

Game	Date	Team	Score	High points	High rebounds	High assists	Location Attendance	Series
1	March 28	Chicago	W 95–80	Goodrich (32)	Chamberlain, Hairston (17)	West (10)	The Forum; 17,505	1–0
2	March 30	Chicago	W 131–124	West (37)	Chamberlain (21)	West (11)	The Forum; 17,505	2–0
3	April 2	@ Chicago	W 108–101	West (31)	Chamberlain (14)	West (9)	Chicago Stadium; 17,805	3–0
4	April 4	@ Chicago	W 108–97	Goodrich (27)	Chamberlain (31)	West (10)	Chicago Stadium; 18,847	4–0

Western Conference Finals: 4–2 (home: 2–1; road: 2–1)

Game	Date	Team	Score	High points	High rebounds	High assists	Location Attendance	Series
1	April 9	Milwaukee	L 72–93	Hairston (16)	Chamberlain (24)	West (6)	The Forum; 17,505	0–1
2	April 12	Milwaukee	W 135–134	McMillian (42)	Chamberlain (17)	West (13)	The Forum; 17,505	1–1
3	April 14	@ Milwaukee	W 108–105	Goodrich (30)	Chamberlain (14)	West (8)	MECCA Arena; 10,746	2–1
4	April 16	@ Milwaukee	L 88–114	West (24)	Chamberlain, Hairston (11)	Chamberlain, West (4)	MECCA Arena; 10,746	2–2
5	April 18	Milwaukee	W 115–90	McMillian (25)	Chamberlain (26)	West (10)	The Forum; 17,505	3–2
6	April 22	@ Milwaukee	W 104–100	West (25)	Chamberlain (24)	West (9)	MECCA Arena; 10,746	4–2

NBA Finals: 4–1 (home: 2–1; road: 2–0)

Game	Date	Team	Score	High points	High rebounds	High assists	Location Attendance	Series
1	April 26	New York	L 92–114	Goodrich (20)	Chamberlain (19)	West (7)	The Forum; 17,505	0–1
2	April 30	New York	W 106–92	Goodrich (31)	Chamberlain (24)	West (13)	The Forum; 17,505	1–1
3	May 3	@ New York	W 107–96	Chamberlain (26)	Chamberlain, Hairston (20)	West (8)	Madison Square Garden; 19,588	2–1
4	May 5	@ New York	W 116–111 (OT)	West (28)	Chamberlain (24)	West (7)	Madison Square Garden; 19,588	3–1
5	May 7	New York	W 114–100	Goodrich (25)	Chamberlain (29)	West (9)	The Forum; 17,505	4–1

1972 schedule

== Player statistics ==
=== Regular season ===
Player	GP	MPG	FG%	FT%	RPG	APG	PPG
Elgin Baylor	9	26.6	.433	.815	6.3	2.0	11.8
Wilt Chamberlain	82	42.3	.649	.422	19.2	4.0	14.8
Jim Cleamons	38	5.3	.350	.778	1.0	0.9	2.6
LeRoy Ellis	74	14.6	.460	.695	4.2	0.6	4.6
Keith Erickson	15	17.5	.482	.857	2.6	2.3	5.7
Gail Goodrich	82	37.1	.487	.850	3.6	4.5	25.9
Happy Hairston	80	34.4	.461	.779	13.1	2.4	13.1
Jim McMillian	80	38.1	.482	.791	6.5	2.6	18.8
Pat Riley	67	13.8	.447	.743	1.9	1.1	6.7
Flynn Robinson	64	15.7	.490	.860	1.8	2.2	9.9
John Q. Trapp	58	13.1	.443	.699	3.1	0.7	5.7
Jerry West	77	38.6	.477	.814	4.2	9.7	25.8

=== Playoffs ===
Player	GP	MPG	FG%	FT%	RPG	APG	PPG
Wilt Chamberlain	15	46.9	.563	.492	21.0	3.3	14.7
Jim Cleamons	6	2.8	.571	N/A	0.7	0.7	1.3
LeRoy Ellis	13	10.3	.463	.250	3.2	0.8	3.0
Gail Goodrich	15	38.3	.445	.898	2.5	3.3	23.8
Happy Hairston	15	38.5	.440	.794	13.1	2.1	13.5
Jim McMillian	15	41.6	.447	.857	5.7	1.5	19.1
Pat Riley	15	16.3	.333	.750	1.9	0.9	5.2
Flynn Robinson	7	10.3	.463	.700	1.9	0.7	6.4
John Q. Trapp	10	7.1	.242	.571	1.6	0.5	2.0
Jerry West	15	40.5	.376	.830	4.9	8.9	22.9

== NBA Finals ==
The Los Angeles Lakers played against the New York Knicks in the NBA finals during the postseason.

=== Game 1 ===
Although without Willis Reed because of his knee injury. Jerry Lucas scored 26 points but was only one of several Knicks who was red hot. Bill Bradley hit 11 of 12 shots from the field as New York shot 53 percent for the game. The team took advantage of a nearly perfect first half to jump to a good lead and won easily, 114–92. Early in the second half, the Forum crowd began filing out dejectedly. It looked like another Los Angeles fold in the Finals.

=== Game 2 ===
Knicks forward Dave DeBusschere hurt his side and didn't play after the first half. Hairston scored 12 points in the second half, and Los Angeles evened the series with a 106–92 win.

=== Game 3 ===
DeBusschere attempted to play in the first half and missed all six of his field-goal attempts. He was hurting and elected not to play in the second half. DeBusschere explained, "I didn't feel I was helping the team." The Lakers danced out to a 22-point lead and regained the home-court advantage with a 107–96 win.

=== Game 4 ===
The game went into overtime, but at the end of regulation, Wilt Chamberlain picked up his fifth foul. In 13 NBA seasons, he had never fouled out of a game, a history he was immensely proud of but also one that usually led to him playing less aggressively when he was on the verge of getting a 6th foul. As the press waited for Wilt to take the floor and hurt the Lakers by reverting to a passive style, he instead came out in a shotblocking fury that propelled the Lakers to a 116–111 win. At three games to one, their lead now seemed insurmountable.

=== Game 5 ===
The Lakers won their sixth NBA championship by the score of 114–100. This was their first championship since moving to Los Angeles in 1960. Jerry West also won his first NBA championship after 12 years of waiting. Wilt Chamberlain scored 24 points and 29 rebounds and earned the NBA Finals MVP Award.

== Award winners ==
- Bill Sharman, NBA Coach of the Year
- Jerry West, All-NBA First Team
- Jerry West, All-NBA Defensive First Team
- Wilt Chamberlain, All-NBA Defensive First Team
- Wilt Chamberlain, NBA Leader, Shooting Percentage (.649)
