= 1971–72 Chicago Bulls season =

NBA professional basketball team season

- Head coach: Dick Motta
- General manager: Pat Williams
- Owner: Dick Klein
- Arena: Chicago Stadium

Results
- Record: 57–25 (.695)
- Place: Division: 2nd (Midwest); Conference: 3rd (Western)
- Playoff finish: Conference semifinals (lost to Lakers 0–4)
- Stats at Basketball Reference

Local media
- Television: WGN-TV (Jack Brickhouse, Vince Lloyd)
- Radio: WIND (Jack Fleming, Bill Berg)

The 1971–72 Chicago Bulls season was the Bulls' sixth season in the NBA.

== Roster ==
1971–72 Chicago Bulls roster
Players

Pos.	No.	Player	Height	Weight	DOB	From
C	18	Tom Boerwinkle	7 ft 0 in (2.13 m)	265 lb (120 kg)	1945-08-23	Tennessee
G	22	Jimmy Collins	6 ft 2 in (1.88 m)	175 lb (79 kg)	1946-11-24	New Mexico State
F	23	Jackie Dinkins	6 ft 5 in (1.96 m)	210 lb (95 kg)	1950-01-22	Voorhees
C	31	Jim Fox	6 ft 10 in (2.08 m)	230 lb (104 kg)	1943-04-07	South Carolina
G	21	Jim King	6 ft 2 in (1.88 m)	175 lb (79 kg)	1941-02-07	Tulsa
F	10	Bob Love	6 ft 8 in (2.03 m)	215 lb (98 kg)	1942-12-08	Southern
F	40	Kennedy McIntosh	6 ft 7 in (2.01 m)	225 lb (102 kg)	1949-01-21	Eastern Michigan
F	54	Howard Porter	6 ft 8 in (2.03 m)	220 lb (100 kg)	1948-08-31	Villanova
C	14	Clifford Ray	6 ft 9 in (2.06 m)	230 lb (104 kg)	1949-01-21	Oklahoma
G	4	Jerry Sloan	6 ft 5 in (1.96 m)	195 lb (88 kg)	1942-03-28	Evansville
G	2	Norm Van Lier	6 ft 1 in (1.85 m)	173 lb (78 kg)	1947-04-01	Saint Francis (PA)
F	25	Chet Walker	6 ft 6 in (1.98 m)	212 lb (96 kg)	1940-02-22	Bradley
G	8	Bob Weiss	6 ft 2 in (1.88 m)	180 lb (82 kg)	1942-05-07	Penn State

Coaches
Head coach
- Dick Motta
Assistant(s)
- Phil Johnson

Legend
- (DP) Unsigned draft pick
- (FA) Free agent
- (S) Suspended
- Injured

Roster
Updated: December 10, 1971

== Regular season ==
=== Season standings ===
Midwest Division	W	L	PCT	GB	Home	Road	Neutral	Div
y-Milwaukee Bucks	63	19	.768	–	31–5	27–12	5–2	13–5
x-Chicago Bulls	57	25	.695	6	29–12	26–12	2–1	12–6
Phoenix Suns	49	33	.598	14	30–11	19–20	0–2	7–11
Detroit Pistons	26	56	.317	37	16–25	9–30	1–1	4–14

#	Western Conference			
#	Team	W	L	PCT
1	z-Los Angeles Lakers	69	13	.841
2	y-Milwaukee Bucks	63	19	.768
3	x-Chicago Bulls	57	25	.695
4	x-Golden State Warriors	51	31	.622
5	Phoenix Suns	49	33	.598
6	Seattle SuperSonics	47	35	.573
7	Houston Rockets	34	48	.415
8	Detroit Pistons	26	56	.317
9	Portland Trail Blazers	18	64	.220

z – clinched division title
y – clinched division title
x – clinched playoff spot

=== Game log ===
1971–72 game log
Total: 57–25 (home: 29–12; road: 26–12)
October: 0–0 (home: 0–0; road: 0–0)

Game	Date	Team	Score	High points	High rebounds	High assists	Location Attendance	Record
1	October 12	Philadelphia	114–100	Bob Love (34)	0–1			
2	October 15	Baltimore	82–106	Bob Love (31)	1–1			
3	October 20	N Houston	110–125	Bob Love (31)	2–1			
4	October 22	@ Los Angeles	113–106	Bob Love (28)	3–1			
5	October 24	@ Phoenix	105–104	Bob Love (29)	4–1			
6	October 26	@ Portland	123–111	Bob Love (36)	5–1			
7	October 29	N Golden State	99–83	Jerry Sloan (25)	5–2			

November : 0–0 (home: 0–0; road: 0–0)

Game	Date	Team	Score	High points	High rebounds	High assists	Location Attendance	Record
8	November 2	Phoenix	101–108	Chet Walker (33)	6–2			
9	November 3	@ Atlanta	113–100	Bob Weiss (27)	7–2			
10	November 5	Milwaukee	104–102	Bob Weiss (30)	7–3			
11	November 6	@ Buffalo	99–130	Jerry Sloan (20)	7–4			
12	November 9	Los Angeles	122–109	Bob Love (25)	7–5			
13	November 10	@ Baltimore	125–106	Jerry Sloan (35)	8–5			
14	November 13	Houston	102–111	Bob Love (30)	9–5			
15	November 16	Seattle	87–95	Bob Love (23)	10–5			
16	November 19	@ Philadelphia	148–104	Love, Walker (25)	11–5			
17	November 20	Boston	106–123	Bob Love (38)	12–5			
18	November 23	Portland	94–130	Chet Walker (23)	13–5			
19	November 26	Golden State	89–121	Bob Love (27)	14–5			
20	November 27	@ New York	99–100	Bob Love (26)	14–6			
21	November 30	Atlanta	85–86	Bob Love (22)	15–6			

December : 0–0 (home: 0–0; road: 0–0)

Game	Date	Team	Score	High points	High rebounds	High assists	Location Attendance	Record
22	December 1	@ Cincinnati	109–101	Bob Love (36)	16–6			
23	December 3	New York	96–122	Bob Love (29)	17–6			
24	December 4	@ Milwaukee	105–108	Chet Walker (28)	17–7			
25	December 7	Cleveland	99–115	Bob Love (40)	18–7			
26	December 9	@ Detroit	107–110	Bob Love (28)	18–8			
27	December 10	Baltimore	102–118	Chet Walker (27)	19–8			
28	December 11	@ Boston	115–99	Jerry Sloan (26)	20–8			
29	December 14	Boston	116–108	Bob Love (28)	20–9			
30	December 17	Houston	109–98	Chet Walker (32)	20–10			
31	December 19	@ Cleveland	119–101	Bob Love (36)	21–10			
32	December 21	Detroit	92–127	Bob Love (28)	22–10			
33	December 23	@ Phoenix	117–108 (OT)	Love, Walker (24)	23–10			
34	December 25	@ Portland	109–88	Bob Love (26)	24–10			
35	December 26	@ Seattle	103–102	Bob Love (28)	25–10			
36	December 28	Milwaukee	105–116	Bob Love (41)	26–10			
37	December 30	Portland	92–117	Norm Van Lier (24)	27–10			

January : 0–0 (home: 0–0; road: 0–0)

Game	Date	Team	Score	High points	High rebounds	High assists	Location Attendance	Record
38	January 4	Phoenix	112–108	Chet Walker (26)	27–11			
39	January 5	@ Philadelphia	139–107	Bob Love (40)	28–11			
40	January 7	Baltimore	104–94	Chet Walker (27)	28–12			
41	January 8	@ New York	113–108	Bob Love (33)	29–12			
42	January 9	Cincinnati	104–108 (OT)	Chet Walker (33)	30–12			
43	January 11	New York	91–116	Bob Weiss (24)	31–12			
44	January 12	@ Boston	112–113	Chet Walker (22)	31–13			
45	January 14	@ Milwaukee	77–104	Chet Walker (17)	31–14			
46	January 15	Portland	100–120	Bob Love (32)	32–14			
47	January 21	@ Buffalo	113–93	Jerry Sloan (23)	33–14			
48	January 22	Houston	108–115	Chet Walker (39)	34–14			
49	January 24	Golden State	105–110	Chet Walker (29)	35–14			
50	January 26	N Houston	108–117	Bob Love (38)	36–14			
51	January 27	@ Golden State	107–108	Chet Walker (29)	36–15			
52	January 28	@ Phoenix	116–102	Bob Love (38)	37–15			
53	January 30	Detroit	99–109	Chet Walker (29)	38–15			

February : 0–0 (home: 0–0; road: 0–0)

Game	Date	Team	Score	High points	High rebounds	High assists	Location Attendance	Record
54	February 1	Seattle	121–103	Bob Love (22)	38–16			
55	February 2	@ Boston	100–124	Bob Love (36)	38–17			
56	February 4	@ Baltimore	110–108	Bob Love (23)	39–17			
57	February 5	Buffalo	96–130	Bob Love (35)	40–17			
58	February 6	Cincinnati	94–119	Chet Walker (56)	41–17			
59	February 8	Cleveland	90–114	Bob Love (30)	42–17			
60	February 11	Atlanta	91–102	Chet Walker (24)	43–17			
61	February 12	@ Atlanta	117–106	Bob Love (35)	44–17			
62	February 13	Golden State	107–88	Love, Sloan (14)	44–18			
63	February 17	New York	102–99 (OT)	Chet Walker (28)	44–19			
64	February 18	@ Detroit	122–97	Jerry Sloan (32)	45–19			
65	February 19	Milwaukee	97–104	Jerry Sloan (23)	46–19			
66	February 20	@ Milwaukee	100–103	Bob Love (19)	46–20			
67	February 22	Philadelphia	88–119	Bob Love (34)	47–20			
68	February 25	Phoenix	107–115	Norm Van Lier (29)	48–20			
69	February 26	@ Golden State	107–106	Bob Love (33)	49–20			
70	February 27	@ Los Angeles	118–123 (OT)	Chet Walker (31)	49–21			
71	February 29	@ Portland	116–92	Chet Walker (30)	50–21			

March : 0–0 (home: 0–0; road: 0–0)

Game	Date	Team	Score	High points	High rebounds	High assists	Location Attendance	Record
72	March 3	@ Seattle	103–112	Chet Walker (28)	50–22			
73	March 5	@ Houston	128–97	Chet Walker (31)	51–22			
74	March 8	@ Atlanta	98–96	Bob Love (28)	52–22			
75	March 10	@ Cincinnati	100–104	Bob Love (28)	52–23			
76	March 14	Seattle	115–111	Chet Walker (37)	52–24			
77	March 17	Buffalo	103–126	Chet Walker (23)	53–24			
78	March 18	@ Cleveland	109–91	Norm Van Lier (22)	54–24			
79	March 19	@ Detroit	115–107	Bob Love (33)	55–24			
80	March 21	Los Angeles	109–104	Bob Love (28)	55–25			
81	March 24	@ Philadelphia	116–99	Love, Sloan (29)	56–25			
82	March 25	Detroit	105–121	Bob Love (30)	57–25			

1971–72 schedule

=== Playoffs ===
1972 playoff game log
Conference semifinals: 0–4 (home: 0–2; road: 0–2)

Game	Date	Team	Score	High points	High rebounds	High assists	Location Attendance	Series
1	March 28	@ Los Angeles	L 80–95	Jerry Sloan (18)	Clifford Ray (17)	Norm Van Lier (4)	The Forum; 17,505	0–1
2	March 30	@ Los Angeles	L 124–131	Bob Love (26)	Clifford Ray (12)	Norm Van Lier (10)	The Forum; 17,505	0–2
3	April 2	Los Angeles	L 101–108	Norm Van Lier (22)	Clifford Ray (20)	Norm Van Lier (8)	Chicago Stadium; 17,805	0–3
4	April 4	Los Angeles	L 97–108	Clifford Ray (20)	Clifford Ray (17)	Norm Van Lier (11)	Chicago Stadium; 18,847	0–4

1972 schedule

== Player statistics ==
Legend
GP	Games played	GS	Games started	MPG	Minutes per game
FG%	Field-goal percentage	3P%	3-point field-goal percentage	FT%	Free-throw percentage
RPG	Rebounds per game	APG	Assists per game	SPG	Steals per game
BPG	Blocks per game	PPG	Points per game

=== Regular season ===
Player	GP	GS	MPG	FG%	3P%	FT%	RPG	APG	SPG	BPG	PPG

=== Playoffs ===
Player	GP	GS	MPG	FG%	3P%	FT%	RPG	APG	SPG	BPG	PPG

== Awards and records ==
- Bob Love, All-NBA Second Team
- Jerry Sloan, NBA All-Defensive First Team
- Norm Van Lier, NBA All-Defensive Second Team
- Bob Love, NBA All-Defensive Second Team
- Clifford Ray, NBA All-Rookie Team 1st Team
- Bob Love, NBA All-Star Game
