= 1971–72 Milwaukee Bucks season =

NBA professional basketball team season

- Division champions
- Head coach: Larry Costello
- Arena: Milwaukee Arena

Results
- Record: 63–19 (.768)
- Place: Division: 1st (Midwest); Conference: 2nd (Western)
- Playoff finish: Conference finals (lost to Lakers 2–4)
- Stats at Basketball Reference

Local media
- Television: WISN-TV
- Radio: WTMJ

The 1971–72 Milwaukee Bucks season was the fourth season in franchise history. Led by Kareem Abdul-Jabbar, the Bucks finished in first place in the Midwest Division. Abdul-Jabbar won the NBA Most Valuable Player Award ahead of Jerry West and Wilt Chamberlain of the Los Angeles Lakers. On January 9, 1972, the Bucks snapped the Los Angeles Lakers' 33-game winning streak.

== Draft picks ==
Round	Pick	Player	Position	Nationality	School/Club team
1	17	Collis Jones		United States	University of Notre Dame
3	51	Gary Brell		United States	Marquette University

== Roster ==
1971–72 Milwaukee Bucks roster
Players

Pos.	No.	Player	Height	Weight	DOB	From
C	33	Kareem Abdul-Jabbar	7 ft 2 in (2.18 m)	225 lb (102 kg)	1947–04–16	UCLA
PG	42	Lucius Allen	6 ft 2 in (1.88 m)	175 lb (79 kg)	1947–09–26	UCLA
F	34	John Block	6 ft 9 in (2.06 m)	207 lb (94 kg)	1944–04–16	USC
SF	10	Bob Dandridge	6 ft 6 in (1.98 m)	195 lb (88 kg)	1947–11–15	Norfolk State
G	24	Wali Jones	6 ft 2 in (1.88 m)	180 lb (82 kg)	1942–02–14	Villanova
F	7	Toby Kimball	6 ft 6 in (1.98 m)	220 lb (100 kg)	1942–09–07	Connecticut
PG	6	Charlie Lowery	6 ft 3 in (1.91 m)	185 lb (84 kg)	1949–11–12	Puget Sound
SG	14	Jon McGlocklin	6 ft 5 in (1.96 m)	205 lb (93 kg)	1943–06–10	Indiana
C	50	Barry Nelson	6 ft 10 in (2.08 m)	230 lb (104 kg)	1949–09–19	Duquesne
F	18	Curtis Perry	6 ft 7 in (2.01 m)	215 lb (98 kg)	1948–09–13	Missouri State
PG	1	Oscar Robertson	6 ft 5 in (1.96 m)	205 lb (93 kg)	1938–11–24	Cincinnati

Coaches
Head coach
- Larry Costello

Legend
- (DP) Unsigned draft pick
- (FA) Free agent
- (S) Suspended
- Injured

== Regular season ==
- January 9: The Bucks ended the Los Angeles Lakers' 33-game winning streak.

=== Season standings ===
Midwest Division	W	L	PCT	GB	Home	Road	Neutral	Div
y-Milwaukee Bucks	63	19	.768	–	31–5	27–12	5–2	13–5
x-Chicago Bulls	57	25	.695	6	29–12	26–12	2–1	12–6
Phoenix Suns	49	33	.598	14	30–11	19–20	0–2	7–11
Detroit Pistons	26	56	.317	37	16–25	9–30	1–1	4–14

#	Western Conference			
#	Team	W	L	PCT
1	z-Los Angeles Lakers	69	13	.841
2	y-Milwaukee Bucks	63	19	.768
3	x-Chicago Bulls	57	25	.695
4	x-Golden State Warriors	51	31	.622
5	Phoenix Suns	49	33	.598
6	Seattle SuperSonics	47	35	.573
7	Houston Rockets	34	48	.415
8	Detroit Pistons	26	56	.317
9	Portland Trail Blazers	18	64	.220

z – clinched division title
y – clinched division title
x – clinched playoff spot

=== Game log ===
1971–72 game log
Total: 63–19 (home: 31–5; road: 27–12; neutral: 5–2)
October: 7–0 (home: 3–0; road: 4–0)

Game	Date	Team	Score	High points	High rebounds	High assists	Location Attendance	Record
1	October 14, 1971	@ Phoenix	W 110–97				Arizona Veterans Memorial Coliseum	1–0
2	October 16, 1971	@ Seattle	W 98–91				Seattle Center Coliseum	2–0
3	October 17, 1971	@ Portland	W 127–94				Memorial Coliseum	3–0
4	October 19, 1971	Cleveland	W 116–82				Milwaukee Arena	4–0
5	October 22, 1971	Buffalo	W 124–105				Milwaukee Arena	5–0
6	October 23, 1971	@ Philadelphia	W 110–88				The Spectrum	6–0
7	October 26, 1971	Baltimore	W 120–90				Milwaukee Arena	7–0

November: 0–0 (home: 0–0; road: 0–0)

Game	Date	Team	Score	High points	High rebounds	High assists	Location Attendance	Record

December: 0–0 (home: 0–0; road: 0–0)

Game	Date	Team	Score	High points	High rebounds	High assists	Location Attendance	Record

January: 0–0 (home: 0–0; road: 0–0)

Game	Date	Team	Score	High points	High rebounds	High assists	Location Attendance	Record

February: 0–0 (home: 0–0; road: 0–0)

Game	Date	Team	Score	High points	High rebounds	High assists	Location Attendance	Record

March: 0–0 (home: 0–0; road: 0–0)

Game	Date	Team	Score	High points	High rebounds	High assists	Location Attendance	Record

1971–72 schedule

== Playoffs ==
1972 playoff game log
Conference Semi-finals: 4–1 (home: 2–1; road: 2–0)

Game	Date	Team	Score	High points	High rebounds	High assists	Location Attendance	Series
1	March 28	Golden State	L 106–117	Kareem Abdul-Jabbar (28)	Kareem Abdul-Jabbar (15)	Lucius Allen (8)	Milwaukee Arena; 9,877	0–1
2	March 30	Golden State	W 118–93	Kareem Abdul-Jabbar (25)	Kareem Abdul-Jabbar (22)	Oscar Robertson (9)	Milwaukee Arena; 10,746	1–1
3	April 1	@ Golden State	W 122–94	Abdul-Jabbar, Dandridge (23)	Kareem Abdul-Jabbar (16)	Oscar Robertson (14)	Oakland–Alameda County Coliseum Arena; 13,502	2–1
4	April 4	@ Golden State	W 106–99	Bob Dandridge (31)	Kareem Abdul-Jabbar (20)	Oscar Robertson (11)	Oakland–Alameda County Coliseum Arena; 12,986	3–1
5	April 6	Golden State	W 108–100	Bob Dandridge (29)	Kareem Abdul-Jabbar (22)	Oscar Robertson (8)	Milwaukee Arena; 10,746	4–1

Conference finals: 2–4 (home: 1–2; road: 1–2)

Game	Date	Team	Score	High points	High rebounds	High assists	Location Attendance	Series
1	April 9	@ Los Angeles	W 93–72	Kareem Abdul-Jabbar (33)	Curtis Perry (23)	Oscar Robertson (10)	The Forum; 17,505	1–0
2	April 12	@ Los Angeles	L 134–135	Kareem Abdul-Jabbar (40)	Curtis Perry (12)	Abdul-Jabbar, Robertson (7)	The Forum; 17,505	1–1
3	April 14	Los Angeles	L 105–108	Kareem Abdul-Jabbar (33)	Kareem Abdul-Jabbar (21)	Abdul-Jabbar, Allen (6)	Milwaukee Arena; 10,746	1–2
4	April 16	Los Angeles	W 114–88	Kareem Abdul-Jabbar (31)	Curtis Perry (19)	Oscar Robertson (10)	Milwaukee Arena; 10,746	2–2
5	April 18	@ Los Angeles	L 90–115	Kareem Abdul-Jabbar (28)	Kareem Abdul-Jabbar (16)	Bob Dandridge (4)	The Forum; 17,505	2–3
6	April 22	Los Angeles	L 100–104	Kareem Abdul-Jabbar (37)	Kareem Abdul-Jabbar (25)	Kareem Abdul-Jabbar (8)	Milwaukee Arena; 10,746	2–4

1972 schedule

== Player statistics ==
Legend
GP	Games played	GS	Games started	MPG	Minutes per game
FG%	Field-goal percentage	3P%	3-point field-goal percentage	FT%	Free-throw percentage
RPG	Rebounds per game	APG	Assists per game	SPG	Steals per game
BPG	Blocks per game	PPG	Points per game

=== Season ===
Player	GP	GS	MPG	FG%	FT%	RPG	APG	SPG	BPG	PPG
Kareem Abdul-Jabbar	81		44.2	57.4	68.9	16.6	4.6			34.8
Bob Dandridge	80		37.0	49.8	73.9	7.7	3.1			18.4
Oscar Robertson	64		37.3	47.2	83.6	5.0	7.7			17.4
Lucius Allen	80		29.0	50.5	76.4	3.2	4.2			13.5
Jon McGlocklin	80		27.7	51.0	86.5	2.3	2.9			10.7
John Block	79		19.3	44.0	74.9	5.2	1.2			8.5
Greg Smith	28		26.3	49.0	70.7	5.8	2.3			8.4
Wali Jones	48		21.5	40.7	82.2	1.6	2.9			7.5
Curtis Perry	50		29.4	38.5	67.4	9.4	1.6			7.0
Toby Kimball	74		13.1	46.7	54.3	4.2	0.8			3.5
McCoy McLemore	10		9.9	32.1	91.7	3.4	1.2			2.9
Charlie Lowery	20		6.7	44.7	61.1	1.0	0.7			2.3
Bill Dinwiddie	23		6.3	28.1	55.6	1.4	0.4			1.6
Jeff Webb	19		5.7	25.7	84.6	0.9	0.4			1.5
Barry Nelson	28		3.6	41.7	50.0	0.7	0.3			1.3

=== Playoffs ===
Player	GP	GS	MPG	FG%	FT%	RPG	APG	SPG	BPG	PPG
Kareem Abdul-Jabbar	11		46.4	43.7	70.4	18.2	5.1			28.7
Bob Dandridge	11		40.1	49.5	74.0	8.8	1.9			21.5
Lucius Allen	11		35.1	47.0	75.9	3.5	3.8			17.9
Oscar Robertson	11		34.5	40.7	83.3	5.8	7.5			13.1
Wali Jones	9		22.2	43.9	85.7	2.0	2.2			10.0
Curtis Perry	11		36.1	47.3	78.3	12.8	1.3			9.5
Jon McGlocklin	5		20.6	42.9	83.3	0.6	1.2			7.0
John Block	11		14.2	38.5	83.3	5.0	0.5			5.0
Toby Kimball	7		5.1	41.7	100.0	0.9	0.3			1.7
Charlie Lowery	7		3.7	25.0	66.7	0.4	0.1			0.9
Barry Nelson	2		2.5	0.0	0.0	0.5	0.5			0.0

== Awards and honors ==
- Kareem Abdul-Jabbar, NBA Most Valuable Player

== Transactions ==
=== Trades ===
September 12, 1971
December 9, 1971
To Milwaukee Bucks----
- John Block
To Milwaukee Bucks----
- Curtis Perry
To Houston Rockets----
- Dick Cunningham
To Houston Rockets----
- Greg Smith
