= Charlie Lowery =

American basketball player

Personal information
- Born: November 12, 1949 (age 77)
- Listed height: 6 ft 3 in (1.91 m)
- Listed weight: 185 lb (84 kg)

Career information
- High school: Ravenswood (East Palo Alto, California)
- College: Puget Sound (1967–1971)
- NBA draft: 1971: 8th round, 125th overall pick
- Drafted by: Seattle SuperSonics
- Playing career: 1971–1972
- Position: Point guard
- Number: 6

Career history
- 1971–1972: Milwaukee Bucks

Career statistics
- Points: 45 (2.3 ppg)
- Rebounds: 19 (1.0 rpg)
- Assists: 14 (0.7 apg)
- Stats at NBA.com
- Stats at Basketball Reference

Charles P. Lowery (born November 12, 1949) is an American former basketball player who played guard in the National Basketball Association. Lowery was originally drafted in the eighth round of the 1971 NBA draft by the Seattle SuperSonics. He would play that season with the Milwaukee Bucks.

== Career statistics ==
Legend
GP	Games played	GS	Games started	MPG	Minutes per game
FG%	Field goal percentage	3P%	3-point field goal percentage	FT%	Free throw percentage
RPG	Rebounds per game	APG	Assists per game	SPG	Steals per game
BPG	Blocks per game	PPG	Points per game	**Bold**	Career high

=== NBA ===
==== Regular season ====
Year	Team	GP	MPG	FG%	FT%	RPG	APG	PPG
1971–72	Milwaukee	20	6.7	.447	.611	1.0	.7	2.3

==== Playoffs ====
Year	Team	GP	MPG	FG%	FT%	RPG	APG	PPG
1972	Milwaukee	7	3.7	.250	.667	.4	.1	.9
