= Jeff Webb (basketball) =

American basketball player (born 1948)

Personal information
- Born: July 6, 1948 (age 78)
- Listed height: 6 ft 4 in (1.93 m)
- Listed weight: 170 lb (77 kg)

Career information
- High school: West Milwaukee (West Milwaukee, Wisconsin)
- College: Kansas State (1967–1970)
- NBA draft: 1970: undrafted
- Playing career: 1970–1972
- Position: Shooting guard
- Number: 8, 10

Career history
- 1970–1972: Milwaukee Bucks
- 1971–1972: Phoenix Suns

Career highlights
- NBA champion (1971)
- Stats at NBA.com
- Stats at Basketball Reference

Jeffrey William Webb (born July 6, 1948) is an American former professional basketball player.

A 6-foot-4-inch (1.93 m) guard from Kansas State University, Webb played two seasons (1970–1972) in the National Basketball Association as a member of the Milwaukee Bucks and Phoenix Suns. He averaged 2.1 points per game in his career and won a league championship with Milwaukee in 1971.

== Career statistics ==
Legend
GP	Games played	GS	Games started	MPG	Minutes per game
FG%	Field goal percentage	3P%	3-point field goal percentage	FT%	Free throw percentage
RPG	Rebounds per game	APG	Assists per game	SPG	Steals per game
BPG	Blocks per game	PPG	Points per game	**Bold**	Career high
†	Won an NBA championship

=== NBA ===
==== Regular season ====
Year	Team	GP	MPG	FG%	FT%	RPG	APG	PPG
1970–71†	Milwaukee	**29**	**10.3**	.346	.733	.8	**.7**	2.2
1971–72	Milwaukee	19	5.7	.257	**.846**	**.9**	.4	1.5
1971–72	Phoenix	27	4.8	**.477**	.500	.6	.6	**2.5**
Career		75	7.2	.376	.711	.8	.6	2.1

==== Playoffs ====
Year	Team	GP	MPG	FG%	FT%	RPG	APG	PPG
1971†	Milwaukee	9	2.6	.571	1.000	.1	.2	1.2
