= Barry Nelson (basketball) =

American basketball player

Personal information
- Born: September 19, 1949 (age 77)
- Listed height: 6 ft 10 in (2.08 m)
- Listed weight: 230 lb (104 kg)

Career information
- High school: Fox Chapel (Fox Chapel, Pennsylvania)
- College: Duquesne (1968–1971)
- NBA draft: 1971: 5th round, 85th overall pick
- Drafted by: Milwaukee Bucks
- Position: Center
- Number: 50

Career history
- 1971–1972: Milwaukee Bucks
- Stats at NBA.com
- Stats at Basketball Reference

Barry G. Nelson is an American former basketball player who played in the National Basketball Association. A center, Nelson was drafted by the Milwaukee Bucks in the fifth round of the 1971 NBA draft and spent the 1971–72 season with the team.

He attended high school in Fox Chapel, Pennsylvania.

== Career statistics ==
Legend
GP	Games played	GS	Games started	MPG	Minutes per game
FG%	Field goal percentage	3P%	3-point field goal percentage	FT%	Free throw percentage
RPG	Rebounds per game	APG	Assists per game	SPG	Steals per game
BPG	Blocks per game	PPG	Points per game	**Bold**	Career high

=== NBA ===
==== Regular season ====
Year	Team	GP	MPG	FG%	FT%	RPG	APG	PPG
1971–72	Milwaukee	28	3.6	.417	.500	.7	.3	1.3

==== Playoffs ====
Year	Team	GP	MPG	FG%	FT%	RPG	APG	PPG
1972	Milwaukee	2	2.5	–	–	.5	.5	.0
