= 1971–72 Golden State Warriors season =

NBA professional basketball team season

- Head coach: Al Attles
- Arena: Oakland-Alameda County Coliseum Arena; San Diego Sports Arena (6 games)

Results
- Record: 51–31 (.622)
- Place: Division: 2nd (Pacific); Conference: 4th (Western)
- Playoff finish: West Conference Semi-finals (eliminated 1–4)
- Stats at Basketball Reference

Local media
- Television: KTVU
- Radio: KGO

The 1971–72 Golden State Warriors season was the Warriors' 26th season in the NBA, the first as the Golden State Warriors in Oakland, and 10th in the San Francisco Bay Area. This was also their only season to play a few home games in San Diego, as part of a brief attempt to represent the whole state of California.

== Offseason ==
=== Draft picks ===
Round	Pick	Player	Position	Nationality	College
1	8	Darnell Hillman	F/C	United States	San José State
4	59	Greg Gary	G	United States	St. Bonaventure
5	76	Odis Allison	F	United States	UNLV
6	93	Charles Johnson	G	United States	California
7	110	Ken May		United States	Dayton
8	127	Jim Haderlein		United States	Loyola Marymount
9	143	Clarence Smith		United States	Villanova
10	159	Bill Drosdiak		United States	Oregon

== Roster ==
1971–72 Golden State Warriors roster
Players

Pos.	No.	Player	Height	Weight	DOB	From
F	22	Odis Allison	6 ft 6 in (1.98 m)	195 lb (88 kg)		UNLV
G	25	Jim Barnett	6 ft 4 in (1.93 m)	170 lb (77 kg)		Oregon
C	20	Vic Bartolome	7 ft 0 in (2.13 m)	230 lb (104 kg)		Oregon State
F	31	Joe Ellis	6 ft 6 in (1.98 m)	175 lb (79 kg)		San Francisco
G	15	Nick Jones	6 ft 2 in (1.88 m)	190 lb (86 kg)		Oregon
F/C	43	Clyde Lee	6 ft 10 in (2.08 m)	205 lb (93 kg)		Vanderbilt
G	23	Jeff Mullins	6 ft 4 in (1.93 m)	190 lb (86 kg)		Duke
G/F	33	Bob Portman	6 ft 5 in (1.96 m)	200 lb (91 kg)		Creighton
F	32	Cazzie Russell	6 ft 5 in (1.96 m)	218 lb (99 kg)		Michigan
F/C	42	Nate Thurmond	6 ft 11 in (2.11 m)	225 lb (102 kg)		Bowling Green
F	34	Bill Turner	6 ft 7 in (2.01 m)	220 lb (100 kg)		Akron
G	21	Ron Williams	6 ft 3 in (1.91 m)	188 lb (85 kg)		West Virginia

Coaches
Head coach
- Al Attles (North Carolina A&T)

Legend
- (DP) Unsigned draft pick
- (FA) Free agent
- (S) Suspended
- Injured

== Regular season ==
=== Season standings ===
Pacific Division	W	L	PCT	GB	Home	Road	Neutral	Div
y-Los Angeles Lakers	69	13	.841	–	36–5	31–7	2–1	21–3
x-Golden State Warriors	51	31	.622	18	27–8	21–20	3–3	14–10
Seattle SuperSonics	47	35	.573	22	28–12	18–22	1–1	12–12
Houston Rockets	34	48	.415	35	15–20	14–23	5–5	9–15
Portland Trail Blazers	18	64	.220	51	14–26	4–35	0–3	4–20

#	Western Conference			
#	Team	W	L	PCT
1	z-Los Angeles Lakers	69	13	.841
2	y-Milwaukee Bucks	63	19	.768
3	x-Chicago Bulls	57	25	.695
4	x-Golden State Warriors	51	31	.622
5	Phoenix Suns	49	33	.598
6	Seattle SuperSonics	47	35	.573
7	Houston Rockets	34	48	.415
8	Detroit Pistons	26	56	.317
9	Portland Trail Blazers	18	64	.220

z – clinched division title
y – clinched division title
x – clinched playoff spot

=== Game log ===
1971–72 Game log
#	Date	Opponent	Score	High points	Record
1	October 15	@ Boston	97–75	Jeff Mullins (28)	1–0
2	October 16	@ Baltimore	93–108	Cazzie Russell (17)	1–1
3	October 19	@ New York	84–93	Cazzie Russell (17)	1–2
4	October 20	@ Cleveland	115–98	Cazzie Russell (29)	2–2
5	October 23	Detroit	109–115 (OT)	Jeff Mullins (35)	3–2
6	October 26	Buffalo	91–89	Cazzie Russell (25)	3–3
7	October 29	N Chicago	99–83	Cazzie Russell (30)	4–3
8	October 30	Cincinnati	112–116	Cazzie Russell (34)	5–3
9	October 31	@ Los Angeles	109–105	Cazzie Russell (32)	6–3
10	November 2	Baltimore	91–106	Cazzie Russell (43)	7–3
11	November 4	Seattle	96–98	Jeff Mullins (22)	8–3
12	November 6	Los Angeles	105–89	Cazzie Russell (19)	8–4
13	November 7	@ Seattle	109–102	Nate Thurmond (28)	9–4
14	November 9	Houston	99–115	Cazzie Russell (23)	10–4
15	November 11	@ New York	112–103	Jeff Mullins (31)	11–4
16	November 12	@ Atlanta	104–106	Nate Thurmond (25)	11–5
17	November 13	@ Cincinnati	101–110	Nate Thurmond (25)	11–6
18	November 16	@ Detroit	122–101	Jeff Mullins (33)	12–6
19	November 18	Portland	105–115	Cazzie Russell (29)	13–6
20	November 20	Milwaukee	100–107	Cazzie Russell (29)	14–6
21	November 21	N Houston	115–96	Cazzie Russell (24)	14–7
22	November 25	Philadelphia	112–111	Cazzie Russell (29)	14–8
23	November 26	@ Chicago	89–121	Jeff Mullins (19)	14–9
24	November 27	@ Buffalo	110–91	Cazzie Russell (28)	15–9
25	November 30	@ Milwaukee	106–103	Joe Ellis (25)	16–9
26	December 3	@ Portland	107–115	Cazzie Russell (28)	16–10
27	December 4	Phoenix	128–92	Cazzie Russell (20)	16–11
28	December 5	@ Phoenix	87–120	Cazzie Russell (34)	16–12
29	December 7	N Atlanta	113–116	Cazzie Russell (33)	16–13
30	December 9	Los Angeles	124–111	Cazzie Russell (28)	16–14
31	December 10	@ Seattle	94–105	Cazzie Russell (26)	16–15
32	December 16	Philadelphia	93–113	Cazzie Russell (30)	17–15
33	December 17	@ Los Angeles	99–129	Cazzie Russell (26)	17–16
34	December 18	Detroit	102–129	Jeff Mullins (25)	18–16
35	December 21	New York	113–87	Nate Thurmond (20)	18–17
36	December 25	@ New York	89–114	Cazzie Russell (30)	18–18
37	December 27	@ Boston	97–99	Nate Thurmond (28)	18–19
38	December 29	@ Cincinnati	107–102	Cazzie Russell (33)	19–19
39	December 30	@ Detroit	128–122	Nate Thurmond (42)	20–19
40	January 4	Buffalo	86–112	Barnett, Mullins (21)	21–19
41	January 6	Portland	115–119	Nate Thurmond (37)	22–19
42	January 8	Boston	106–128	Cazzie Russell (31)	23–19
43	January 9	@ Houston	113–112	Cazzie Russell (31)	24–19
44	January 11	Cleveland	92–101	Mullins, Russell (24)	25–19
45	January 14	N New York	111–115	Nate Thurmond (31)	26–19
46	January 15	Baltimore	95–105	Joe Ellis (24)	27–19
47	January 21	@ Atlanta	113–111	Cazzie Russell (26)	28–19
48	January 22	@ Philadelphia	113–106	Jim Barnett (29)	29–19
49	January 24	@ Chicago	105–110	Jeff Mullins (43)	29–20
50	January 25	@ Cleveland	117–111	Cazzie Russell (35)	30–20
51	January 27	Chicago	107–108	Nate Thurmond (31)	31–20
52	January 28	@ Portland	105–102	Nate Thurmond (27)	32–20
53	January 29	Phoenix	100–111	Jeff Mullins (35)	33–20
54	February 1	N Milwaukee	108–97	Jeff Mullins (23)	33–21
55	February 3	Atlanta	115–132	Cazzie Russell (36)	34–21
56	February 4	@ Phoenix	105–113	Nate Thurmond (35)	34–22
57	February 5	Los Angeles	108–96	Nate Thurmond (29)	34–23
58	February 8	Baltimore	107–111	Nate Thurmond (38)	35–23
59	February 10	Philadelphia	112–121	Nate Thurmond (32)	36–23
60	February 12	@ Milwaukee	100–123	Nate Thurmond (25)	36–24
61	February 13	@ Chicago	107–88	Jeff Mullins (27)	37–24
62	February 15	@ Buffalo	103–100	Cazzie Russell (32)	38–24
63	February 18	@ Seattle	108–110	Nate Thurmond (25)	38–25
64	February 19	Boston	111–115	Jeff Mullins (28)	39–25
65	February 22	Seattle	104–120	Mullins, Russell (26)	40–25
66	February 24	Detroit	106–116	Nate Thurmond (27)	41–25
67	February 26	Chicago	107–106	Jim Barnett (32)	41–26
68	February 27	@ Houston	117–104	Russell, Thurmond (28)	42–26
69	February 29	Cincinnati	120–128	Nate Thurmond (27)	43–26
70	March 3	N Houston	107–108	Jeff Mullins (30)	44–26
71	March 4	Seattle	96–114	Jeff Mullins (25)	45–26
72	March 7	Cleveland	112–119	Nate Thurmond (30)	46–26
73	March 10	@ Houston	119–116	Cazzie Russell (30)	47–26
74	March 12	@ Cincinnati	106–117	Nate Thurmond (24)	47–27
75	March 14	@ Boston	110–124	Nate Thurmond (35)	47–28
76	March 16	Portland	94–107	Nate Thurmond (26)	48–28
77	March 17	@ Portland	109–114	Nate Thurmond (39)	48–29
78	March 18	Phoenix	116–134	Mullins, Thurmond (30)	49–29
79	March 19	@ Los Angeles	99–162	Jim Barnett (15)	49–30
80	March 22	@ Baltimore	121–101	Cazzie Russell (33)	50–30
81	March 24	@ Atlanta	102–118	Bob Portman (22)	50–31
82	March 26	@ Philadelphia	116–115	Nate Thurmond (32)	51–31

== Playoffs ==
1972 playoff game log
Conference Semi-finals: 1–4 (home: 0–2; road: 1–2)

Game	Date	Team	Score	High points	High rebounds	High assists	Location Attendance	Series
1	March 28	@ Milwaukee	W 117–106	Jim Barnett (30)	Nate Thurmond (20)	Thurmond, Mullins (9)	Milwaukee Arena; 9,877	1–0
2	March 30	@ Milwaukee	L 93–118	Nate Thurmond (32)	Thurmond, Lee (18)	Thurmond, Barnett (5)	Milwaukee Arena; 10,746	1–1
3	April 1	Milwaukee	L 94–122	Nate Thurmond (21)	Nate Thurmond (21)	Jim Barnett (7)	Oakland–Alameda County Coliseum Arena; 13,502	1–2
4	April 4	Milwaukee	L 99–106	Jim Barnett (29)	Clyde Lee (16)	Jeff Mullins (6)	Oakland–Alameda County Coliseum Arena; 12,986	1–3
5	April 6	@ Milwaukee	L 100–108	Nate Thurmond (26)	Nate Thurmond (15)	Nate Thurmond (7)	Milwaukee Arena; 10,746	1–4

1972 schedule

== Awards and records ==
- Nate Thurmond, NBA All-Defensive Second Team
