= Western Conference (NBA) =

Conference of the National Basketball Association

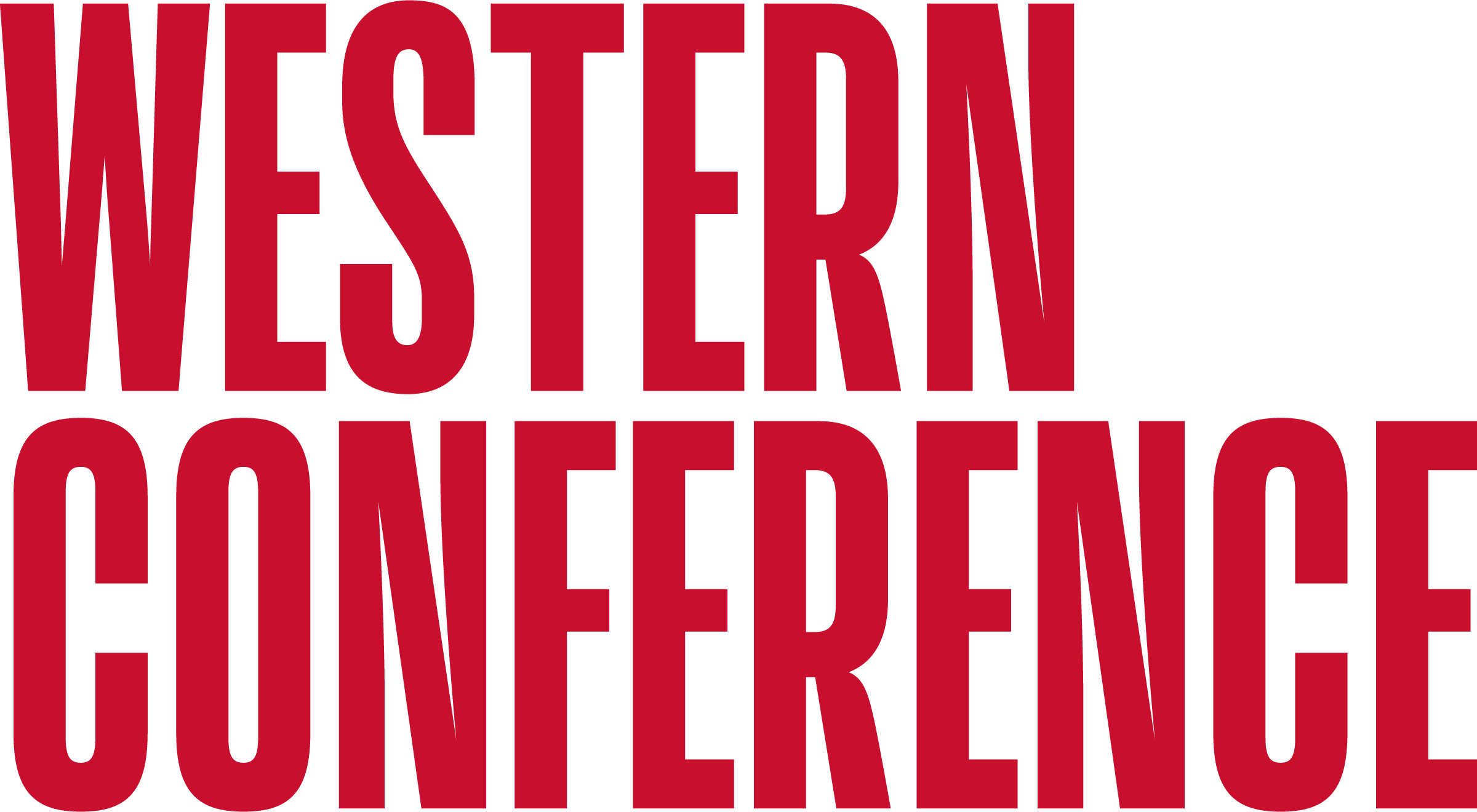
- Formerly: Western Division
- League: National Basketball Association
- Sport: Basketball
- Founded: 1970
- Divisions: 3
- No. of teams: 15
- Country: United States
- Most recent champions: San Antonio Spurs (7th title)
- Most titles: Los Angeles Lakers (19 titles)

The Western Conference is one of two conferences that make up the National Basketball Association (NBA), the other being the Eastern Conference. Both conferences consist of 15 teams organized into three divisions. The Western Conference comprises the Northwest, Pacific, and Southwest Divisions.

The current divisional alignment was adopted at the start of the 2004–05 season, when the now Charlotte Hornets (then known as the Charlotte Bobcats) began play as the NBA's 30th franchise. This necessitated the move of the New Orleans Pelicans (named New Orleans Hornets at the time) from the Eastern Conference's Central Division to the newly created Southwest Division of the Western Conference.

The NBA first started awarding a Western Conference championship trophy during the 2000–01 season, renaming it after Hall of Famer Oscar Robertson in the 2021–22 season. Also in 2021–22, the league began awarding the Earvin "Magic" Johnson Trophy to the Western Conference Finals Most Valuable Player, named after Hall of Famer Magic Johnson.

== 2026–27 standings ==
Western Conference
#	Team	W	L	PCT	GB	GP
1	Oklahoma City Thunder *	2	0	1.000	–	2
2	Los Angeles Clippers *	1	0	1.000	0.5	1
3	Houston Rockets *	1	0	1.000	0.5	1
4	Portland Trail Blazers	1	0	1.000	0.5	1
5	Los Angeles Lakers	1	0	1.000	0.5	1
6	Memphis Grizzlies	1	0	1.000	0.5	1
7	Minnesota Timberwolves	1	0	1.000	0.5	1
8	Denver Nuggets	0	1	.000	1.5	1
9	San Antonio Spurs	0	1	.000	1.5	1
10	Dallas Mavericks	0	1	.000	1.5	1
11	Utah Jazz	0	1	.000	1.5	1
12	Golden State Warriors	0	1	.000	1.5	1
13	Sacramento Kings	0	1	.000	1.5	1
14	Phoenix Suns	0	1	.000	1.5	1
15	New Orleans Pelicans	0	1	.000	1.5	1

Notes

- * – Division leader

== Teams ==
Team	Division	Location	Year	From
Team	Division	Location	Joined	
Dallas Mavericks	Southwest	Dallas, Texas	1980–present	—†
Denver Nuggets	Northwest	Denver, Colorado	1976–present	ABA‡
Golden State Warriors	Pacific	San Francisco, California	1970–present	Western Division
Houston Rockets	Southwest	Houston, Texas	1970–present	Western Division
Los Angeles Clippers	Pacific	Los Angeles, California	1978–present	Eastern Conference
Los Angeles Lakers	Pacific	Los Angeles, California	1970–present	Western Division
Memphis Grizzlies	Southwest	Memphis, Tennessee	1995–present	—†
Minnesota Timberwolves	Northwest	Minneapolis, Minnesota	1989–present	—†
New Orleans Pelicans	Southwest	New Orleans, Louisiana	2004–present	Eastern Conference
Oklahoma City Thunder	Northwest	Oklahoma City, Oklahoma	1970–present	Western Division
Phoenix Suns	Pacific	Phoenix, Arizona	1970–present	Western Division
Portland Trail Blazers	Northwest	Portland, Oregon	1970–present	—†
Sacramento Kings	Pacific	Sacramento, California	1972–present	Eastern Conference
San Antonio Spurs	Southwest	San Antonio, Texas	1980–present	Eastern Conference
Utah Jazz	Northwest	Salt Lake City, Utah	1979–present	Eastern Conference

=== Former teams ===
Team	Location	Year	From	Year	To	Current conference
Team	Location	Joined		Left		Current conference
Charlotte Hornets	Charlotte, North Carolina	1989	Eastern Conference	1990	Eastern Conference	Eastern Conference
Chicago Bulls	Chicago, Illinois	1970	Western Division	1980	Eastern Conference	Eastern Conference
Detroit Pistons	Detroit, Michigan	1970	Eastern Division	1978	Eastern Conference	Eastern Conference
Indiana Pacers	Indianapolis, Indiana	1976	ABA‡	1979	Eastern Conference	Eastern Conference
Miami Heat	Miami, Florida	1988	—†	1989	Eastern Conference	Eastern Conference
Milwaukee Bucks	Milwaukee, Wisconsin	1970	Eastern Division	1980	Eastern Conference	Eastern Conference
Orlando Magic	Orlando, Florida	1990	Eastern Conference	1991	Eastern Conference	Eastern Conference

Notes

- † denotes an expansion team.
- ‡ denotes a team that merged from the American Basketball Association (ABA).

=== Team timeline ===
Denotes team that is currently in the conference
Denotes team that has left the conference

== Conference champions ==
**Bold**	Winning team of the NBA Finals
^	Had or tied for the best regular season record for that season

Season	Team	Record	Playoffs result
1970–71	**Milwaukee Bucks**^	66–16	Won NBA Finals 4–0
1971–72	**Los Angeles Lakers**^	69–13	Won NBA Finals 4–1
1972–73	Los Angeles Lakers	60–22	Lost NBA Finals 1–4
1973–74	Milwaukee Bucks^	59–23	Lost NBA Finals 3–4
1974–75	**Golden State Warriors**	59–23	Won NBA Finals 4–0
1975–76	Phoenix Suns	52–30	Lost NBA Finals 2–4
1976–77	**Portland Trail Blazers**	49–33	Won NBA Finals 4–2
1977–78	Seattle SuperSonics	46–36	Lost NBA Finals 3–4
1978–79	**Seattle SuperSonics**	52–30	Won NBA Finals 4–1
1979–80	**Los Angeles Lakers**	60–22	Won NBA Finals 4–2
1980–81	Houston Rockets	40–42	Lost NBA Finals 2–4
1981–82	**Los Angeles Lakers**	57–25	Won NBA Finals 4–2
1982–83	Los Angeles Lakers	58–24	Lost NBA Finals 0–4
1983–84	Los Angeles Lakers	54–28	Lost NBA Finals 3–4
1984–85	**Los Angeles Lakers**	62–20	Won NBA Finals 4–2
1985–86	Houston Rockets	51–31	Lost NBA Finals 2–4
1986–87	**Los Angeles Lakers**^	65–17	Won NBA Finals 4–2
1987–88	**Los Angeles Lakers**^	62–20	Won NBA Finals 4–3
1988–89	Los Angeles Lakers	57–25	Lost NBA Finals 0–4
1989–90	Portland Trail Blazers	59–23	Lost NBA Finals 1–4
1990–91	Los Angeles Lakers	58–24	Lost NBA Finals 1–4
1991–92	Portland Trail Blazers	57–25	Lost NBA Finals 2–4
1992–93	Phoenix Suns^	62–20	Lost NBA Finals 2–4
1993–94	**Houston Rockets**	58–24	Won NBA Finals 4–3
1994–95	**Houston Rockets**	47–35	Won NBA Finals 4–0
1995–96	Seattle SuperSonics	64–18	Lost NBA Finals 2–4
1996–97	Utah Jazz	64–18	Lost NBA Finals 2–4
1997–98	Utah Jazz^	62–20	Lost NBA Finals 2–4
1998–99	**San Antonio Spurs**^	37–13	Won NBA Finals 4–1
1999–00	**Los Angeles Lakers**^	67–15	Won NBA Finals 4–2
2000–01	**Los Angeles Lakers**	56–26	Won NBA Finals 4–1
2001–02	**Los Angeles Lakers**	58–24	Won NBA Finals 4–0
2002–03	**San Antonio Spurs**^	60–22	Won NBA Finals 4–2
2003–04	Los Angeles Lakers	56–26	Lost NBA Finals 1–4
2004–05	**San Antonio Spurs**	59–23	Won NBA Finals 4–3
2005–06	Dallas Mavericks	60–22	Lost NBA Finals 2–4
2006–07	**San Antonio Spurs**	58–24	Won NBA Finals 4–0
2007–08	Los Angeles Lakers	57–25	Lost NBA Finals 2–4
2008–09	**Los Angeles Lakers**	65–17	Won NBA Finals 4–1
2009–10	**Los Angeles Lakers**	57–25	Won NBA Finals 4–3
2010–11	**Dallas Mavericks**	57–25	Won NBA Finals 4–2
2011–12	Oklahoma City Thunder	47–19	Lost NBA Finals 1–4
2012–13	San Antonio Spurs	58–24	Lost NBA Finals 3–4
2013–14	**San Antonio Spurs**^	62–20	Won NBA Finals 4–1
2014–15	**Golden State Warriors**^	67–15	Won NBA Finals 4–2
2015–16	Golden State Warriors^	73–9	Lost NBA Finals 3–4
2016–17	**Golden State Warriors**^	67–15	Won NBA Finals 4–1
2017–18	**Golden State Warriors**	58–24	Won NBA Finals 4–0
2018–19	Golden State Warriors	57–25	Lost NBA Finals 2–4
2019–20	**Los Angeles Lakers**	52–19	Won NBA Finals 4–2
2020–21	Phoenix Suns	51–21	Lost NBA Finals 2–4
2021–22	**Golden State Warriors**	53–29	Won NBA Finals 4–2
2022–23	**Denver Nuggets**	53–29	Won NBA Finals 4–1
2023–24	Dallas Mavericks	50–32	Lost NBA Finals 1–4
2024–25	**Oklahoma City Thunder**^	68–14	Won NBA Finals 4–3
2025–26	San Antonio Spurs	62–20	Lost NBA Finals 1–4

== Conference championships by team ==
Team	Championships won	Last
Los Angeles Lakers	19	2020
Golden State Warriors	7	2022
San Antonio Spurs	7	2026
Seattle Supersonics/Oklahoma City Thunder	5	2025
Houston Rockets	4	1995
Phoenix Suns	3	2021
Portland Trail Blazers	3	1992
Dallas Mavericks	3	2024
Milwaukee Bucks	2	1974^
Utah Jazz	2	1998
Denver Nuggets	1	2023
Memphis Grizzlies	0	N/A
Minnesota Timberwolves	0	N/A
New Orleans Pelicans	0	N/A
Los Angeles Clippers	0	N/A
Sacramento Kings	0	N/A

^Note: Milwaukee joined the Eastern Conference during the 1980–81 season.

== Season results ==
Legend
^	Denotes team that won the NBA Finals
^{+}	Denotes team that won the Conference Finals, but lost the NBA Finals
*	Denotes team that qualified for the NBA playoffs
×	Denotes team that qualified for the NBA play-in tournament

1970–1980 seasons

Season	Team (record)														
Season	1st	2nd	3rd	4th	5th	6th	7th	8th	9th	10th	11th	12th	13th	14th	15th
1970–71	MIL^ (66–16)	LAL* (48–34)	CHI* (51–31)	SF* (41–41)	PHX (48–34)	DET (45–37)	SD (40–42)	SEA (38–44)	POR (29–53)	—N/a	—N/a	—N/a	—N/a	—N/a	—N/a
1971–72	LAL^ (69–13)	MIL* (63–19)	CHI* (57–25)	GSW* (51–31)	PHX (49–33)	SEA (47–35)	HOU (34–48)	DET (26–56)	POR (18–64)	—N/a	—N/a	—N/a	—N/a	—N/a	—N/a
1972–73	MIL* (60–22)	LAL^{+} (60–22)	CHI* (51–31)	GSW* (47–35)	DET (40–42)	PHX (38–44)	KC-O (36–46)	SEA (26–56)	POR (21–61)	—N/a	—N/a	—N/a	—N/a	—N/a	—N/a
1973–74	MIL^{+} (59–23)	LAL* (47–35)	CHI* (54–28)	DET* (52–30)	GSW (44–38)	SEA (36–46)	KC-O (33–49)	PHX (30–52)	POR (27–55)	—N/a	—N/a	—N/a	—N/a	—N/a	—N/a
1974–75	GSW^ (48–34)	CHI* (47–35)	KC-O* (44–38)	SEA* (43–39)	DET* (40–42)	POR (38–44)	MIL (38–44)	PHX (32–50)	LAL (30–52)	—N/a	—N/a	—N/a	—N/a	—N/a	—N/a
1975–76	GSW* (59–23)	MIL* (38–44)	SEA* (43–39)	PHX^{+} (42–40)	DET* (36–46)	LAL (40–42)	POR (37–45)	KC (31–51)	CHI (24–58)	—N/a	—N/a	—N/a	—N/a	—N/a	—N/a
1976–77	LAL* (53–29)	DEN* (50–32)	POR^ (49–33)	GSW* (46–36)	DET* (44–38)	CHI* (44–38)	SEA (40–42)	KC (40–42)	IND (36–46)	PHX (34–48)	MIL (30–52)	—N/a	—N/a	—N/a	—N/a
1977–78	POR* (58–24)	DEN* (50–32)	PHX* (49–33)	SEA^{+} (46–36)	LAL* (44–38)	MIL* (44–38)	GSW (40–42)	CHI (40–42)	DET (36–46)	KC (34–48)	IND (30–52)	—N/a	—N/a	—N/a	—N/a
1978–79	SEA^ (52–30)	KC* (48–34)	PHX* (50–32)	DEN* (47–35)	LAL* (47–35)	POR* (45–37)	SD (43–39)	MIL (38–44)	GSW (38–44)	IND (38–44)	CHI (31–51)	—N/a	—N/a	—N/a	—N/a
1979–80	LAL^ (60–22)	MIL* (49–33)	SEA* (56–26)	PHX* (55–27)	KC* (47–35)	POR* (38–44)	SD (35–47)	DEN (30–52)	CHI (30–52)	GSW (24–58)	UTA (24–58)	—N/a	—N/a	—N/a	—N/a

1980–1990 seasons

Season	Team (record)														
Season	1st	2nd	3rd	4th	5th	6th	7th	8th	9th	10th	11th	12th	13th	14th	15th
1980–81	PHX* (57–25)	SAS* (52–30)	LAL* (54–28)	POR* (45–37)	KC* (40–42)	HOU^{+} (40–42)	GSW (39–43)	DEN (37–45)	SD (36–46)	SEA (34–48)	UTA (28–54)	DAL (15–67)	—N/a	—N/a	—N/a
1981–82	LAL^ (57–25)	SAS* (48–34)	SEA* (52–30)	DEN* (46–36)	PHX* (46–36)	HOU* (46–36)	GSW (45–37)	POR (42–40)	KC (30–52)	DAL (28–54)	UTA (25–57)	SD (17–65)	—N/a	—N/a	—N/a
1982–83	LAL^{+} (58–24)	SAS* (53–29)	PHX* (53–29)	SEA* (48–34)	POR* (46–36)	DEN* (46–37)	KC (46–37)	DAL (38–44)	GSW (30–52)	UTA (30–52)	SD (25–57)	HOU (14–68)	—N/a	—N/a	—N/a
1983–84	LAL^{+} (54–28)	UTA* (45–37)	POR* (48–34)	DAL* (43–39)	SEA* (42–40)	PHX* (41–41)	DEN* (38–44)	KC* (38–44)	GSW (37–45)	SAS (37–45)	SD (30–52)	HOU (29–53)	—N/a	—N/a	—N/a
1984–85	LAL^ (62–20)	DEN* (52–30)	HOU* (48–34)	DAL* (44–38)	POR* (42–40)	UTA* (41–41)	SAS* (41–41)	PHX* (36–46)	KC (31–51)	SEA (31–51)	LAC (31–51)	GSW (22–60)	—N/a	—N/a	—N/a
1985–86	LAL* (62–20)	HOU^{+} (51–31)	DEN* (47–35)	DAL* (44–38)	UTA* (42–40)	POR* (40–42)	SAC* (37–45)	SAS* (35–47)	PHX (32–50)	LAC (32–50)	SEA (31–51)	GSW (30–52)	—N/a	—N/a	—N/a
1986–87	LAL^ (65–17)	DAL* (55–27)	POR* (49–33)	UTA* (44–38)	GSW* (42–40)	HOU* (42–40)	SEA* (39–43)	DEN* (37–45)	PHX (36–46)	SAC (29–53)	SAS (28–54)	LAC (12–70)	—N/a	—N/a	—N/a
1987–88	LAL^ (62–20)	DEN* (54–28)	DAL* (53–29)	POR* (53–29)	UTA* (47–35)	HOU* (46–36)	SEA* (44–38)	SAS* (31–51)	PHX (28–54)	SAC (24–58)	GSW (20–62)	LAC (17–65)	—N/a	—N/a	—N/a
1988–89	LAL^{+} (57–25)	UTA* (51–31)	PHX* (55–27)	SEA* (47–35)	HOU* (45–37)	DEN* (44–38)	GSW* (43–39)	POR* (39–43)	DAL (38–44)	SAC (27–55)	LAC (21–61)	SAS (21–61)	MIA (15–67)	—N/a	—N/a
1989–90	LAL* (63–19)	SAS* (56–26)	POR^{+} (59–23)	UTA* (55–27)	PHX* (54–28)	DAL* (47–35)	DEN* (43–39)	HOU* (41–41)	SEA (41–41)	GSW (37–45)	LAC (30–52)	SAC (23–59)	MIN (22–60)	CHA (19–63)	—N/a

1990–2000 seasons

Season	Team (record)														
Season	1st	2nd	3rd	4th	5th	6th	7th	8th	9th	10th	11th	12th	13th	14th	15th
1990–91	POR* (63–19)	SAS* (55–27)	LAL^{+} (58–24)	PHX* (55–27)	UTA* (54–28)	HOU* (52–30)	GSW* (44–38)	SEA* (41–41)	ORL (31–51)	LAC (32–51)	MIN (29–53)	DAL (28–54)	SAC (25–57)	DEN (20–62)	—N/a
1991–92	POR^{+} (57–25)	UTA* (55–27)	GSW* (55–27)	PHX* (53–29)	SAS* (47–35)	SEA* (47–35)	LAC* (45–37)	LAL* (43–39)	HOU (42–40)	SAC (29–53)	DEN (24–58)	DAL (22–60)	MIN (15–67)	—N/a	—N/a
1992–93	PHX^{+} (62–20)	HOU* (55–27)	SEA* (55–27)	POR* (51–31)	SAS* (49–33)	UTA* (47–35)	LAC* (41–41)	LAL* (39–43)	DEN (36–46)	GSW (34–48)	SAC (25–57)	MIN (19–63)	DAL (11–71)	—N/a	—N/a
1993–94	SEA* (63–19)	HOU^ (58–24)	PHX* (56–26)	SAS* (55–27)	UTA* (53–39)	GSW* (50–32)	POR* (47–35)	DEN* (42–40)	LAL (33–49)	SAC (28–54)	LAC (27–55)	MIN (20–62)	DAL (13–69)	—N/a	—N/a
1994–95	SAS* (62–20)	PHX* (59–23)	UTA* (60–22)	SEA* (57–25)	LAL* (48–34)	HOU^ (47–35)	POR* (44–38)	DEN* (41–41)	SAC (39–43)	DAL (36–46)	GSW (26–56)	MIN (21–61)	LAC (17–65)	—N/a	—N/a
1995–96	SEA^{+} (64–18)	SAS* (59–23)	UTA* (55–27)	LAL* (53–29)	HOU* (48–34)	POR* (44–38)	PHX* (41–41)	SAC* (39–43)	GSW (36–46)	DEN (35–47)	LAC (29–53)	MIN (26–56)	DAL (26–56)	VAN (15–67)	—N/a
1996–97	UTA^{+} (64–18)	SEA* (57–25)	HOU* (57–25)	LAL* (56–26)	POR* (49–33)	MIN* (40–42)	PHX* (40–42)	LAC* (36–46)	SAC (34–48)	GSW (30–52)	DAL (24–58)	DEN (21–61)	SAS (20–62)	VAN (14–68)	—N/a
1997–98	UTA^{+} (62–20)	SEA* (61–21)	LAL* (61–21)	PHX* (56–26)	SAS* (56–26)	POR* (46–36)	MIN* (45–37)	HOU* (41–41)	SAC (27–55)	DAL (20–62)	VAN (19–63)	GSW (19–63)	LAC (17–65)	DEN (11–71)	—N/a
1998–99	SAS^ (37–13)	UTA* (37–13)	POR* (35–15)	LAL* (31–19)	HOU* (31–19)	PHX* (27–23)	SAC* (27–23)	MIN* (25–25)	SEA (25–25)	GSW (21–29)	DAL (19–31)	DEN (14–36)	LAC (9–41)	VAN (8–42)	—N/a
1999–00	LAL^ (67–15)	UTA* (55–27)	POR* (59–23)	SAS* (53–29)	PHX* (53–29)	MIN* (50–32)	SEA* (45–37)	SAC* (44–38)	DAL (40–42)	DEN (35–47)	HOU (34–48)	VAN (22–60)	GSW (19–63)	LAC (15–67)	—N/a

2000–2010 seasons

Season	Team (record)														
Season	1st	2nd	3rd	4th	5th	6th	7th	8th	9th	10th	11th	12th	13th	14th	15th
2000–01	SAS* (58–24)	LAL^ (56–26)	SAC* (55–27)	UTA* (53–29)	DAL* (53–29)	PHX* (53–29)	POR* (50–32)	MIN* (47–35)	HOU (45–37)	SEA (44–38)	DEN (40–42)	LAC (31–51)	VAN (23–59)	GSW (17–65)	—N/a
2001–02	SAC* (61–21)	SAS* (58–24)	LAL^ (56–26)	DAL* (53–29)	MIN* (53–29)	POR* (53–29)	SEA* (50–32)	UTA* (47–35)	LAC (45–37)	PHX (44–38)	HOU (40–42)	DEN (31–51)	MEM (23–59)	GSW (17–65)	—N/a
2002–03	SAS^ (60–22)	SAC* (59–23)	DAL* (60–22)	MIN* (51–31)	LAL* (50–32)	POR* (50–32)	UTA* (47–35)	PHX* (44–38)	HOU (43–39)	SEA (40–42)	GSW (38–44)	MEM (28–54)	LAC (27–55)	DEN (17–65)	—N/a
2003–04	MIN* (58–24)	LAL^{+} (56–26)	SAS* (57–25)	SAC* (55–27)	DAL* (52–30)	MEM* (50–32)	HOU* (45–37)	DEN* (43–39)	UTA (42–40)	POR (41–41)	GSW (37–45)	SEA (37–45)	PHX (29–53)	LAC (28–54)	—N/a
2004–05	PHX* (62–20)	SAS^ (59–23)	SEA* (52–30)	DAL* (58–24)	HOU* (51–31)	SAC* (50–32)	DEN* (49–33)	MEM* (45–37)	MIN (44–38)	LAC (37–45)	LAL (34–48)	GSW (34–48)	POR (27–55)	UTA (26–56)	NO (18–64)
2005–06	SAS* (63–19)	PHX* (54–28)	DEN* (44–38)	DAL^{+} (60–22)	MEM* (49–33)	LAC* (47–35)	LAL* (45–37)	SAC* (44–38)	UTA (41–41)	NO/OKC^{[a]} (38–44)	SEA (35–47)	HOU (34–48)	GSW (34–48)	MIN (33–49)	POR (21–61)
2006–07	DAL* (67–15)	PHX* (61–21)	SAS^ (58–24)	UTA* (58–24)	HOU* (52–30)	DEN* (45–37)	LAL* (42–40)	GSW* (42–40)	LAC (40–42)	NO/OKC^{[a]} (39–43)	SAC (33–49)	POR (32–50)	MIN (32–50)	SEA (31–51)	MEM (22–60)
2007–08	LAL^{+} (57–25)	NO* (56–26)	SAS* (56–26)	UTA* (54–28)	HOU* (55–27)	PHX* (55–27)	DAL* (51–31)	DEN* (50–32)	GSW (48–34)	POR (41–41)	SAC (38–44)	LAC (23–59)	MEM (22–60)	MIN (22–60)	SEA (20–62)
2008–09	LAL^ (65–17)	DEN* (54–28)	SAS* (54–28)	POR* (54–28)	HOU* (53–29)	DAL* (50–32)	NO* (49–33)	UTA* (48–34)	PHX (46–36)	GSW (29–53)	MIN (24–58)	MEM (24–58)	OKC (23–59)	LAC (19–63)	SAC (17–65)
2009–10	LAL^ (57–25)	DAL* (55–27)	PHX* (54–28)	DEN* (53–29)	UTA* (53–29)	POR* (50–32)	SAS* (50–32)	OKC* (50–32)	HOU (42–40)	MEM (40–42)	NO (37–45)	LAC (29–53)	GSW (26–56)	SAC (25–57)	MIN (15–67)

2010–2020 seasons

Season	Team (record)														
Season	1st	2nd	3rd	4th	5th	6th	7th	8th	9th	10th	11th	12th	13th	14th	15th
2010–11	SAS* (61–21)	LAL* (57–25)	DAL^ (57–25)	OKC* (55–27)	DEN* (50–32)	POR* (48–34)	NO* (46–36)	MEM* (46–36)	HOU (43–39)	PHX (40–42)	UTA (39–43)	GSW (36–46)	LAC (32–50)	SAC (24–58)	MIN (17–65)
2011–12	SAS* (50–16)	OKC^{+} (47–19)	LAL* (41–25)	MEM* (41–25)	LAC* (40–26)	DEN* (38–28)	DAL* (36–30)	UTA* (36–30)	HOU (34–32)	PHX (33–33)	POR (28–38)	MIN (26–40)	GSW (23–43)	SAC (22–44)	NO (21–45)
2012–13	OKC* (60–22)	SAS^{+} (58–24)	DEN* (57–25)	LAC* (56–26)	MEM* (56–26)	GSW* (47–35)	LAL* (45–37)	HOU* (45–37)	UTA (43–39)	DAL (41–41)	POR (33–49)	MIN (31–51)	SAC (28–54)	NO (27–55)	PHX (25–57)
2013–14	SAS^ (62–20)	OKC* (59–23)	LAC* (57–25)	HOU* (54–28)	POR* (54–28)	GSW* (51–31)	MEM* (50–32)	DAL* (49–33)	PHX (48–34)	MIN (40–42)	DEN (36–46)	NO (34–48)	SAC (28–54)	LAL (27–55)	UTA (25–57)
2014–15	GSW^ (67–15)	HOU* (56–26)	LAC* (56–26)	POR* (51–31)	MEM* (55–27)	SAS* (55–27)	DAL* (50–32)	NO* (45–37)	OKC (45–37)	PHX (39–43)	UTA (38–44)	DEN (30–52)	SAC (29–53)	LAL (21–61)	MIN (16–66)
2015–16	GSW^{+} (73–9)	SAS* (67–15)	OKC* (55–27)	LAC* (53–29)	POR* (44–38)	DAL* (42–40)	MEM* (42–40)	HOU* (41–41)	UTA (40–42)	SAC (33–49)	DEN (33–49)	NO (30–52)	MIN (29–53)	PHX (23–59)	LAL (17–65)
2016–17	GSW^ (67–15)	SAS* (61–21)	HOU* (55–27)	LAC* (51–31)	UTA* (51–31)	OKC* (47–35)	MEM* (43–39)	POR* (41–41)	DEN (40–42)	NO (34–48)	DAL (33–49)	SAC (32–50)	MIN (31–51)	LAL (26–56)	PHX (24–58)
2017–18	HOU* (65–17)	GSW^ (58–24)	POR* (49–33)	OKC* (48–34)	UTA* (48–34)	NO* (48–34)	SAS* (47–35)	MIN* (47–35)	DEN (46–36)	LAC (42–40)	LAL (35–47)	SAC (27–55)	DAL (24–58)	MEM (22–60)	PHX (21–61)
2018–19	GSW^{+} (57–25)	DEN* (54–28)	POR* (53–29)	HOU* (53–29)	UTA* (50–32)	OKC* (49–33)	SAS* (48–34)	LAC* (48–34)	SAC (39–43)	LAL (37–45)	MIN (36–46)	MEM (33–49)	NO (33–49)	DAL (33–49)	PHX (19–63)
2019–20	LAL^ (52–19)	LAC* (49–23)	DEN* (46–27)	HOU* (44–28)	OKC* (44–28)	UTA* (44–28)	DAL* (43–32)	POR* (35–39)	MEM× (34–39)	PHX (34–39)	SAS (32–39)	SAC (31–41)	NO (30–42)	MIN (19–45)	GSW (15–50)

2020–2030 seasons

Season	Team (record)														
Season	1st	2nd	3rd	4th	5th	6th	7th	8th	9th	10th	11th	12th	13th	14th	15th
2020–21	UTA* (52–20)	PHX^{+} (51–21)	DEN* (47–25)	LAC* (47–25)	DAL* (42–30)	POR* (42–30)	LAL* (42–30)	GSW× (39–33)	MEM* (38–34)	SAS× (33–39)	NO (31–41)	SAC (31–41)	MIN (23–49)	OKC (22–50)	HOU (17–55)
2021–22	PHX* (64–18)	MEM* (56–26)	GSW^ (53–29)	DAL* (52–30)	UTA* (49–33)	DEN* (48–34)	MIN* (46–36)	LAC× (42–40)	NO* (36–46)	SAS× (34–48)	LAL (33–49)	SAC (30–52)	POR (27–55)	OKC (24–58)	HOU (20–62)
2022–23	DEN^ (53–29)	MEM* (51–31)	SAC* (48–34)	PHX* (45–37)	LAC* (44–38)	GSW* (44–38)	LAL* (43–39)	MIN* (42–40)	NO× (42–40)	OKC× (40–42)	DAL (38–44)	UTA (37–45)	POR (33–49)	HOU (22–60)	SAS (22–60)
2023–24	OKC* (57–25)	DEN* (57–25)	MIN* (56–26)	LAC* (51–31)	DAL^{+} (50–32)	PHX* (49–33)	NO* (49–33)	LAL* (47–35)	SAC× (46–36)	GSW× (46–36)	HOU (41–41)	UTA (31–51)	MEM (27–55)	SAS (22–60)	POR (21–61)
2024–25	OKC^ (68–14)	HOU* (52–30)	LAL* (50–32)	DEN* (50–32)	LAC* (50–32)	MIN* (49–33)	GSW* (48–34)	MEM* (48–34)	SAC× (40–42)	DAL× (39–43)	PHX (36–46)	POR (36–46)	SAS (34–48)	NO (21–61)	UTA (17–65)
2025–26	OKC* (64–18)	SAS^{+} (62–20)	DEN* (54–28)	LAL* (53–29)	HOU* (52–30)	MIN* (49–33)	PHX* (45–37)	POR* (42–40)	LAC× (42–40)	GSW× (37–45)	NO (26–56)	DAL (26–56)	MEM (25–57)	SAC (22–60)	UTA (22–60)

== Notes ==
- ^{a 1} ^{2} ^{3} The New Orleans Hornets temporarily relocated to Oklahoma City due to the effect of Hurricane Katrina. The majority of home games were played in Oklahoma City, while a few remained in New Orleans.
