= Tom Newell (basketball) =

American basketball coach

Tom Newell is an American former professional basketball coach.

Attended University of Hawaii at Manoa in 1971, he began his career working as a scout for the Golden State Warriors in the 1980s. After serving as the Indiana Pacers' Director of Player Personnel in 1984, he moved on to be an assistant coach for the Seattle SuperSonics (now in Oklahoma City). During the 1990s, he served as assistant coaches for the New Jersey Nets, college scout Milwaukee Bucks, and asst. coach Dallas Mavericks. In 1995, he became the head coach of the Greek professional team Iraklis Thessaloniki B.C. and began his works on international programs. With extensive experience, he later joined the coaching staff of the short-lived WNBA team Portland Fire. Coach Newell also has been the Men's National Team Coach of Japan (2000), as well as Coach of the Jilin NE Tigers China Basketball Association team. He currently represents the State Department as a Sports Ambassador, teaching coaches and players about the game of basketball, he also represents FIBA as one of the Expert Instructors in their Olympic Development Program for Third World countries. Coach Newell is very active in his community with free camps and clinics for kids ages: 7–15. The camp program is designed to teach kids about being on a team, working together and making right choices away from home and school environs. The themes of his Best Effort Camps & Clinics are: "Eat Right to Play Right" and "Let's Cease to be Obese". The program received the prestigious "Denny Award" from the City of Seattle Parks and Recreation Department, acknowledging those citizens who volunteer projects in education and environment that enhance the lives of others in the Seattle community (2008).
