= Chico Vaughn =

American basketball player

Personal information
- Born: February 19, 1940 Hodges Park, Illinois, U.S.
- Died: October 25, 2013 (aged 73)
- Listed height: 6 ft 2 in (1.88 m)
- Listed weight: 190 lb (86 kg)

Career information
- High school: Egyptian (Tamms, Illinois)
- College: Southern Illinois (1959–1962)
- NBA draft: 1962: 4th round, 26th overall pick
- Drafted by: St. Louis Hawks
- Playing career: 1962–1970
- Position: Shooting guard / point guard
- Number: 17, 10

Career history
- 1962–1965: St. Louis Hawks
- 1965–1967: Detroit Pistons
- 1967–1970: Pittsburgh / Minnesota Pipers

Career highlights
- ABA champion (1968); ABA All-Star (1968); No. 20 retired by Southern Illinois Salukis; First-team Little All-American (1961); Second-team Little All-American (1960)

Career NBA and ABA statistics
- Points: 5,822 (11.9 ppg)
- Rebounds: 1,224 (2.5 rpg)
- Assists: 1,024 (2.1 apg)
- Stats at NBA.com
- Stats at Basketball Reference

Charles "Chico" Vaughn Sr. (February 19, 1940 – October 25, 2013) was an American basketball player. As a 6 ft 2 in (1.88 m) guard, he played five seasons in the National Basketball Association (NBA) with the St. Louis Hawks and Detroit Pistons, and three seasons in the American Basketball Association (ABA) with the Pittsburgh/Minnesota Pipers. Vaughn became a fulltime starter for the first time as a professional with the Pipers in the 1967–68 season. He averaged nearly 20 points per game, was selected to play in the 1968 ABA All-Star Game, and the Pipers were ABA champions in 1968. In his first two seasons with the Pipers, he was second in the ABA in three-point field goals attempted, made, and three-point field goals made per game. In a March 1969 game for the Minnesota Pipers, Vaughn set an ABA record by scoring 12 points in less than one minute; and later that season set a new record for three-point field goals made in a single playoff game.

He set and still holds the all-time record for total points scored among male high school basketball players in Illinois, playing at Tamms High School in Southern Illinois (1954 to 1958). He attended Southern Illinois University where he played basketball with the Southern Illinois Salukis (1958 to 1962), setting school records in total points scored and scoring average, even though he missed a large part of his senior season, which remain school records. United Press International named Vaughn a second-team Little All-American in 1960 and a first-team Little All-American in 1961. He played in the Interstate Intercollegiate Athletic Conference (IIAC) where he was named first-team All-IIAC in his first three seasons at SIU, and was selected as the IIAC's most valuable player in 1959–60. Vaughn's jersey No. 20 was retired by SIU and he was inducted into the Salukis Hall of Fame in 1978.

== Early life ==
Vaughn was born on February 19, 1940, in Hodges Park, Illinois to Milton and LaVern Vaughan. He was the fifth child born among four brothers and three sisters. He moved with his family to Portland, Oregon where his father worked in shipyards, before returning to Southern Illinois when he was in sixth grade. Vaughn learned his fundamental basketball skills from his older brother, who had played semipro basketball in Oregon. Vaughn was such a talented basketball player that his local Portland school wanted Vaughn to stay in Portland with his grandmother so he could continue playing for the school, but he went with his family back to Illinois.

His family moved back to Hodges Park (a town of 300 people) near Tamms, Illinois. Tamms, a suburb of Cairo, Illinois, was a town of 800 people. From 1954 to 1958 he attended Tamms High School (now known as Egyptian High School). He originally played for the school's freshman basketball team, but was elevated to the varsity team early in the season and went on to lead the varsity team in scoring that year.

Vaughn has scored the most total points over a career in Illinois boys high school basketball history, tallying 3,358 points in 105 games over his four varsity seasons. He also has the highest scoring average per game in Illinois boys high school basketball history. It has also been reported that he had 3,378 points in high school. During his high school career, Vaughn scored over 60 points in a game three times, and once scored 30 points in the fourth quarter of a game, among other offensive accomplishments. This was during an era without the three-point shot. Vaughn said his shooting range went up to 30 feet, and that 70% of his shots during high school would have been three-point shots under later rules.

Tamms was one of Southern Illinois' first integrated schools, and under head coach Scottie Lynch the team consisted of both black and white players. Vaughn considered Lynch a positive influence on his life. While playing against other high school teams in Southern Illinois, Vaughn was the object of racial slurs. Vaughn later said, "'It was bad . . . Some of the teams had never seen a black ballplayer before. We just tried to play the game and get out of there, but I heard plenty of racial insults along the way'". Vaughn did not engage with the race baiting, saying “I knew myself and what I was about . . . As long as they didn’t touch me or lay a hand on me words didn’t mean anything. I tried to make my statement and do my talking on the court'".

== College career ==
Hundreds of colleges and universities expressed interest in having Vaughn attend their schools. Vaughn originally intended to attend Bradley University in Peoria, Illinois, but ultimately decided not to do so. He then planned to attend the University of Dayton, in Ohio, and was working at Dayton during the summer after graduating high school. However, during a trip home to Illinois he was actively recruited by Southern Illinois University's (SIU) new head basketball coach Harry Gallatin. Gallatin convinced Vaughan to attend SIU, and personally drove Vaughn back to Dayton to retrieve his belongings. Vaughn also had a desire to be closer to home when he attended college.

Vaughn became the player upon whom Gallatin built his Southern Illinois Salukis teams, playing in the Interstate Intercollegiate Athletic Conference (IIAC). Vaughn's four years at SIU (1954 to 1958) coincided with Gallatin's coaching career there. He played forward and guard for the Salukis during his college career. In an early December 1958 game against Drury College, Vaughn, playing forward, scored 28 points in leading SIU to Gallatin's first career win at the school.

As a freshman (1958–59), Vaughn led the IIAC in conference scoring (23.6 points per game), and did so again as a sophomore (25.8 points per game). Overall in both conference and non-conference games, Vaughan averaged 23.8 points per game as a freshman and 26.9 points per game as a sophomore. His 26.9 points per game average is a Saluki single season record. Vaughn was also a strong rebounder. As a freshman he averaged 10 rebounds per game, and set a Saluki record with 20 rebounds in a single game. As a sophomore, he led the Salukis with 9.6 rebounds per game. It was during his sophomore year at SIU that friends began calling him "Chico" and the nickname stuck with him the rest of his life.

Vaughan was the only freshman on the 1958–59 All-NAIA District 20 all-star team, selected by the coaches of the 22 NAIA schools in Illinois. The other four players selected were all seniors. He was first-team All-NAIA District 20 again as a sophomore. Vaughn was first-team All-IIAC as both a freshman (at forward) and sophomore, and he was selected by the conference's seven coaches as the IIAC's most valuable player for the 1959–60 season. Vaughn also set nine new individual SIU records that season, including most points in a game (43). In 1960, United Press International (UPI) named Vaughn a second-team Little All-American, and it has been reported that he barely missed being named a UPI first-team Little All-American that year. UPI gave him honorable mention as an All-American. Vaughn was an Associated Press (AP) honorable mention Little All-American in 1960.

In 1960–61, Vaughn averaged 23.4 points per game, leading the Salukis in scoring. He was second (by one point) in the voting for IIAC most valuable player in 1961. He was named first-team All-IIAC for the third consecutive season, as a guard. In 1961, UPI named Vaughn a first-team Little All-American. The AP again made him an honorable mention Little All-American. Vaughn had missed some games in the first part of that season because of academic ineligibility.

As a senior (1961–62), he led the team in free throw shooting percentage (.804), but only played in a limited number of games as a senior because of academic ineligibility. In nine games as a senior, he averaged 21.9 points per game. Vaughn's academic ineligibility was from his admitted failure to attend classes, which also resulted in his leaving school to play in the NBA without obtaining a degree at the time.

Over his career at SIU, Vaughan scored 2,088 points, the most in school history. He averaged 24.6 points per game over his SIU career, also a school record. He averaged 7.84 rebounds per game over his SIU college career.

Vaughan played at a time when there was no three-point shot. At the time of his death, one of his college teammates stated of Vaughn that "'He could beat you any way he wanted to beat you. He could shoot the ball from the outside. He could penetrate. He could pull up. He could do anything that could be done'". Vaughn had an unorthodox behind the head release that made his shot difficult to block. Vaughn was described as being an accurate shooter while jumping and falling away from the basket on long shots, and that "He held the ball behind his head and fired off his right ear with uncanny precision". Salukis' coach Harry Gallatin said of Vaughan "'his specialty is his fade-away jump shot and the way he handles himself there is absolutely no defense to stop him . . . the shot is unorthodox but it's basically sound. And it's impossible to defense unless you're behind his back'". Vaughn's unusual jump-shooting style began as a child, when he had to pull the ball back behind his ear to get enough strength to reach the basket on a jump shot.

== Professional career ==
=== NBA career ===
The St. Louis Hawks drafted Vaughan with the first pick in the fourth round of the 1962 NBA draft, 28th overall. Vaughn was actually selected by the Chicago Packers, but the Packers owed the Hawks this pick as part of an earlier trade and drafted Vaughn for the Hawks. In mid-March 1962, before the draft, the Hawks had hired Harry Gallatin, Vaughn's SIU coach, to be the Hawks' new head coach. Gallatin brought Vaughn to the Hawks.

As a rookie (1962–63), Vaughn was a reserve shooting guard playing behind shooting guard John Barnhill and point guard Lenny Wilkens. He played in 77 games, averaging 24 minutes per game. He averaged 10.1 points, 3.3 assists, and 3.1 rebounds per game. In the first game of the first round of the NBA playoffs that season against the Detroit Pistons, Vaughn played an important role in the Hawks' victory by speeding up the game's pace to the Hawks' favor. The Hawks won that series three games to one. Vaughn averaged 26.8 minutes, 6.5 points, 3.5 assists, and 3.5 rebounds per game during that series.

The Hawks then played in the NBA's Western Division finals against the Los Angeles Lakers, losing three games to four. Vaughn played in all seven games, averaging 29.6 minutes, 12 points, 2.4 assists and 2.4 rebounds per game. After losing the first game, Gallatin made Vaughn a starter in the second game of the series. He played only 21 minutes and scored six points in the Hawks' 101–99 loss. In Game 3, Vaughn started again, scoring 23 points in 36 minutes in a 125–112 Hawks' win; making ten field goals in 16 attempts. Only future Naismith Hall of Fame teammate Bob Pettit scored more points for the Hawks in that game. Vaughn scored 14 points in 30 minutes in the Hawk's Game 4 win, led the Hawks in scoring in a Game 5 loss, had 14 points in 29 minutes in the series tying Game 6 win, and scored eight points in 34 minutes in Game 7.

The following season (1963–64), Vaughn averaged nearly 20 minutes per game in 68 games for the Hawks. He averaged 8.6 points, 1.9 rebounds, and 1.9 assists per game. The Hawks defeated the Lakers three games to two in the Western Division semifinals, with Vaughn averaging 21 minutes, 8.6 points, 3.2 rebounds, and 1.8 assists per game. In the Hawks' Game 2 win, Vaughn scored 15 points in 26 minutes. The Hawks lost to Wilt Chamberlain and the San Francisco Warriors in the Western Division finals, three games to four. Vaughn averaged 19.6 minutes, 8.9 points, 1.3 rebounds, and 1.7 assists per game in the series. In the Game 3 Hawks' win, Vaughn scored 22 points in 32 minutes.

In 75 games with the Hawks in 1964–65, Vaughn averaged NBA career highs in minutes per game (26.2) and points per game (11.6). In late December 1964, the Hawks fired Gallatin as head coach and replaced him with shooting guard Richie Guerin who became the Hawks' player-coach. In late December of the following season (1965–66), the Hawks traded Vaughn and John Tresvant to the Detroit Pistons for Rod Thorn. In trading for Vaughn, Pistons player-coach Dave DeBusschere said "'Vaughn is the hard-nosed type of player who should bolster our defense . . . He's strong, aggressive and can score from the outside as well as close in'". At the time of the trade, Vaughn had played in 19 games for the Pistons that season, averaging 23.4 minutes, 10 points, 2.4 rebounds, and 1.9 assists per game. He played in 37 games for the Pistons to finish the season, averaging 20.9 minutes, 7.6 points, 2.8 assists, and 1.7 rebounds per game.

The 1966–67 season was Vaughn's final NBA season, playing in only 51 games for the Pistons while averaging career lows of 4.3 points and 13.3 minutes per game. At the end of the season, the Pistons left Vaughn exposed in the NBA expansion draft, and he was selected by the San Diego Rockets in May 1967.

Vaughn played in 327 regular season NBA games, averaging 21.6 minutes, 8.9 points, 2.2 rebounds, and 2.3 assists per game. He also played in 27 NBA playoff games, averaging 23.4 minutes, 8.9 points, 2.3 rebounds, and 2.3 assists per game.

=== ABA career ===
Rather than play for the Rockets, Vaughan joined the rival American Basketball Association (ABA) in 1967, signing with the Pittsburgh Pipers in June 1967. For the first time in his professional career Vaughn was a fulltime starter. He averaged 38.6 minutes per game as the Pipers' shooting guard. Vaughn averaged 19.9 points, four rebounds, and 1.9 assists per game, and was selected to play in the 1968 ABA All-Star Game, along with teammate Connie Hawkins. During the regular season, Vaughn was the team's fourth leading scorer, behind Hawkins, Art Heyman, and Charlie Williams.

The Pipers won the ABA Eastern Division semifinals over the Indiana Pacers in three straight games, and then defeated the Minnesota Muskies four games to one in the Eastern Division finals. The Pipers then defeated the New Orleans Buccaneers in seven games to win the 1968 ABA championship. Against the Pacers, Vaughn averaged 14.3 points, four assists, and 3.3 rebounds per game. He averaged 21 points per game against the Muskies, and averaged 16.9 points and 3.1 rebounds per game in the seven games against the Buccaneers.

This was the first time at any level of organized basketball that Vaughn played under rules that included three-point field goals. He was second in the ABA that season in three-point field goals attempted (410) and made (137), and was virtually tied for the ABA lead in averaging 1.9 three-point field goals made per game (1.9). He was third in the ABA in three-point field goal percentage (.334). In a mid-January 1968 win over the Pacers Vaughn scored 40 points, including five successful three-point shots.

Before the start of the 1968–69 season, the Pipers moved from Pittsburgh to Minnesota. Vaughn played in 69 games for the Minnesota Pipers that season, averaging 33.3 minutes per game. He averaged 17.8 points, 2.4 rebounds, and 1.6 assists per game. Vaughan was again second in the ABA in three-point field goals attempted (145) and made (523), and three-point field goals made per game (2.1); but 11th in the ABA in three-point field goal percentage (.277). During the 1969 ABA playoffs, Vaughn set an ABA playoff record by making six three-point field goals in a game (broken the following season by Roger Brown). In a March 4 game against the Denver Rockets, while playing as a reserve, Vaughn set an ABA record by scoring 12 points in 55 or 58 seconds; consisting of three three-point field goals, one two-point field goal, and a free throw.

Pipers team owner Gabe Rubin moved the team back to Pittsburgh for the 1969–70 season. This was Vaughn's last ABA season. He underwent knee surgery and missed the majority of the season. He played in only 21 games, averaging 19.1 minutes and 9.7 points per game. He retired in 1970. In a little over two ABA seasons, he played in 164 games, averaging 33.9 minutes, 17.7 points, three rebounds, and 1.7 assists per game. In 20 ABA playoff games, he averaged 31.7 minutes, 15 points, 2.3 rebounds, and 1.8 assists per game.

== Honors ==
In 1978, Vaughn was inducted into the Saluki Hall of Fame. SIU has retired Vaughn's No. 20 jersey. It has been reported that Vaughn's was the first jersey number to be retired in school history, or that it was retired on March 2, 1992, second to Walt Frazier, whose jersey number was retired in 1974.

== Personal life and death ==
After retiring from professional basketball, Vaughn was involved with youth and adult recreation. In 1971, he began working in Sterling, Illinois with Human Development for the Handicapped, where among other things he organized a Special Olympics competition. He next worked at the Dixon Springs Youth Center in Dixon, Illinois, until 1979. In late 1985 or in 1986, Vaughn returned to SIU to pursue his bachelor's degree in recreation. Gallatin, with whom Vaughn maintained a relationship, had encouraged Vaughn over the years to go back to school to earn a degree. Vaughn conducted basketball clinics at SIU for underprivileged children in 1986 and 1987. Vaughn obtained his bachelor's degree in recreation at SIU in 1988.

After obtaining his degree, Vaughn worked at Meridian High School as a teaching assistant for over 15 years. Meridian's dean of students and/or school athletic director Mitch Haskins described the integral role Haskins served among Meridian's students: "'He’s there greeting the students every morning and he’ll talk to them about the game the night before or the one coming up or what was on television the night before or maybe even a concert they attended . . . He does some tutorial work with students and he talks about the importance of academics. And there are many times that students come to him with their personal problems. He’s a father-figure to many of the students here'".

He died on October 26, 2013, of cancer at the age of 73 at his home in Hodges Park. His wife June and son Justin predeceased him, and he was survived by five children, 19 grandchildren, and four great grandchildren.

== Career statistics ==
Legend
GP	Games played	GS	Games started	MPG	Minutes per game
FG%	Field goal percentage	3P%	3-point field goal percentage	FT%	Free throw percentage
RPG	Rebounds per game	APG	Assists per game	SPG	Steals per game
BPG	Blocks per game	PPG	Points per game	**Bold**	Career high
*	Led the league

†	Denotes seasons in which Vaughn's team won an ABA championship

=== NBA/ABA ===
==== Regular season ====
Year	Team	GP	MPG	FG%	3P%	FT%	RPG	APG	PPG
1962–63	St. Louis	**77**	24.0	.417		.720	3.4	**3.3**	10.1
1963–64	St. Louis	68	19.7	**.442**		.723	1.9	1.9	8.6
1964–65	St. Louis	75	26.2	.424		.752	2.3	2.1	11.6
1965–66	St. Louis	19	23.4	.375		.742	2.4	1.9	10.0
1965–66	Detroit	37	20.9	.390		.732	1.7	2.8	7.6
1966–67	Detroit	51	13.3	.376		.676	1.3	1.5	4.3
1967–68†	Pittsburgh (ABA)	74	**38.6**	.379	**.334**	.740	**4.0**	1.9	**19.9**
1968–69	Minnesota (ABA)	69	33.3	.355	.277	**.769**	2.4	1.6	17.8
1969–70	Minnesota (ABA)	21	19.1	.367	.293	.686	1.3	1.0	9.7
Career (NBA)		327	21.6	.415		.728	2.2	2.3	8.9
Career (ABA)		164	33.9	.368	.301	.747	3.0	1.7	17.7
Career (overall)		491	25.7	.392	.301	.738	2.5	2.1	11.9
All-Star (ABA)		1	4.0	1.000	1.000	–	.0	.0	6.0

==== Playoffs ====
Year	Team	GP	MPG	FG%	3P%	FT%	RPG	APG	PPG
1963	St. Louis	11	28.5	**.479**		.667	2.8	2.8	10.0
1964	St. Louis	12*	20.2	.426		.731	2.1	1.8	8.8
1965	St. Louis	4	18.8	.310		**.875**	1.5	2.5	6.3
1968†	Pittsburgh (ABA)	**15**	**38.4**	.352	.258	.795	**3.5**	**2.9**	**17.7**
1969	Minnesota (ABA)	5	11.4	.297	**.286**	.857	1.2	.2	6.8
Career (NBA)		27	23.4	.434		.721	2.3	2.3	8.9
Career (ABA)		20	31.7	.345	.263	.800	3.0	2.3	15.0
Career (overall)		47	26.9	.383	.263	.767	2.6	2.3	11.5
