= 1968–69 Minnesota Pipers season =

- Head coach: Jim Harding (20–13); Vern Mikkelsen (6–6); Gus Young (10–23)
- Arena: Met Center

Results
- Record: 36–42 (.462)
- Place: Division: 4th (Eastern)
- Playoff finish: Lost in the Eastern Division Semifinals

Local media
- Television: WTCN 11
- Radio: KSTP

The 1968–69 Minnesota Pipers season was the only season of the Pipers franchise up in the state of Minnesota and second overall season in the American Basketball Association. The previous season, the Pipers had won the ABA Finals, but moved the team from Pittsburgh to Minnesota (which had just lost the Muskies) after the season ended.

However, the Pipers would have a rollercoaster of a season in Minnesota before deciding to relocate back to Pittsburgh for 1969. The team went through three coaches: Jim Harding, was fired after attacking Pipers Chairman Gabe Rubin at an All-Star Game banquet. Mikkelsen (the general manager) took over for a while before Gus Young took the job permanently. At the All-Star break, the Pipers were 26-19. However, the team went into a dry spell, losing twelve of their last fifteen games to end the regular season, with Hawkins, Williams, Vaughn, and Heyman each being nagged by injuries due to long practices. The Pipers lost in the Division Semifinals to the Miami Floridians. While the state of Minnesota would try a third time to get a new ABA team in the state with the owner of the Memphis Tams later having a desire to sell the team and potentially move the franchise up to St. Paul instead of within the Minneapolis area, they would not have a professional basketball team again until 1989 with the Minnesota Timberwolves out in the NBA.

== Roster ==
1968–69 Minnesota Pipers roster
Players

Pos.	No.	Player	Height	Weight	DOB	From
C	25	Dan Anderson	6 ft 10 in (2.08 m)	230 lb (104 kg)	February 15, 1943	Augsburg
SF	35	Frank Card	6 ft 7 in (2.01 m)	195 lb (88 kg)	December 28, 1944	South Carolina State
SG	30	Steve Chubin	6 ft 2 in (1.88 m)	200 lb (91 kg)	February 8, 1944	Rhode Island
C	42	Connie Hawkins	6 ft 8 in (2.03 m)	210 lb (95 kg)	July 17, 1942	Iowa
SF	12	Art Heyman	6 ft 5 in (1.96 m)	205 lb (93 kg)	June 24, 1941	Duke
C	41	Tom Hoover	6 ft 9 in (2.06 m)	230 lb (104 kg)	January 23, 1941	Villanova
F	45	Tony Jackson	6 ft 4 in (1.93 m)	200 lb (91 kg)	November 7, 1942	St. John's
PG	20	Jim Jarvis	6 ft 1 in (1.85 m)	175 lb (79 kg)	March 3, 1943	Oregon State
G	14	Arvesta Kelly	6 ft 2 in (1.88 m)	175 lb (79 kg)	November 20, 1945	Lincoln (MO)
F	13	Jim Kissane	6 ft 7 in (2.01 m)	210 lb (95 kg)	August 17, 1946	Boston College
C	23, 41	Tom Kondla	6 ft 8 in (2.03 m)	225 lb (102 kg)	November 30, 1946	Minnesota
C	24	Mike Lewis	6 ft 8 in (2.03 m)	225 lb (102 kg)	March 18, 1946	Duke
PF	30	Willie Porter	6 ft 7 in (2.01 m)	205 lb (93 kg)	July 3, 1941	Tennessee State
C	15	George Sutor	6 ft 8 in (2.03 m)	235 lb (107 kg)	September 14, 1943	La Salle
PG	22	Steve Vacendak	6 ft 1 in (1.85 m)	185 lb (84 kg)	August 15, 1944	Duke
SG	10	Chico Vaughn	6 ft 2 in (1.88 m)	190 lb (86 kg)	February 19, 1940	Southern Illinois
PF	32	Trooper Washington	6 ft 7 in (2.01 m)	215 lb (98 kg)	April 21, 1944	Cheyney
SF	12	Ken Wilburn	6 ft 6 in (1.98 m)	195 lb (88 kg)	June 8, 1944	Central State
PG	44	Charlie Williams	6 ft 0 in (1.83 m)	165 lb (75 kg)	September 5, 1943	Seattle
PF	24	Leroy Wright	6 ft 9 in (2.06 m)	215 lb (98 kg)	May 6, 1938	Pacific

Coaches
Head coach
- Jim Harding
  Vern Mikkelsen
  Verl Young

Legend
- (DP) Unsigned draft pick
- (FA) Free agent
- (S) Suspended
- Injured

Roster

== Final standings ==
=== Eastern Division ===
Team	W	L	PCT.	GB
Indiana Pacers	44	34	.564	-
Miami Floridians	43	35	.551	1
Kentucky Colonels	42	36	.538	2
Minnesota Pipers	36	42	.462	8
New York Nets	17	61	.218	27

== ABA Playoffs ==
ABA Eastern Division Semifinals vs. Miami Floridians

Game	Date	Location	Score	Record	Attendance
1	April 7	Miami	110–119	0–1	4,103
2	April 9	Miami	106–99	1–1	1,688
3	April 10	Minnesota	109–93	2–1	1,520
4	April 12	Minnesota	109–116	2–2	2,532
5	April 13	Miami	107–122	2–3	4,206
6	April 15	Minnesota	105–100	3–3	1,345
7	April 19	Miami	128–137	3–4	5,702

Pipers lose series, 4–3

== Awards and honors ==
1969 ABA All-Star Game selections (game played on January 28, 1969)

- Trooper Washington
- Charlie Williams
- Connie Hawkins had been selected, but he was injured.

Jim Harding was originally selected to coach the team, but Gene Rhodes of the Kentucky Colonels replaced him after his firing.
