= 1969–70 Pittsburgh Pipers season =

- Head coach: John Clark (14–25); Buddy Jeannette (15–30)
- Arena: Pittsburgh Civic Arena

Results
- Record: 29–55 (.345)
- Place: Division: 5th (Eastern)

The 1969–70 Pittsburgh Pipers season was the second season of the Pipers franchise out in Pittsburgh (third overall season when including their previous season that they had in the state of Minnesota while using the Pipers name) in the American Basketball Association.

== History ==
The Pipers, having moved back to Pittsburgh after one season played up in Minnesota, faltered without Connie Hawkins (who had gone to the Phoenix Suns following the NBA's decision to unban him after previously being considered a player to have been permanently banned from the NBA at the time due to alleged involvement with Jack Molinas during the period of the 1961 NCAA University Division men's basketball gambling scandal back when Molinas was considered the ringleader of that operation) alongside injuries and middling attendance due to locals being more apathetic about the team's sudden return after previously being jaded with the team's departure a season earlier. The Pipers lost the first 9 games of the 1970 calendar year, with their biggest win streak being 3 games (done twice). Near the end of their season, on April 10, 1970, the Pipers would allow an ABA record-high 177 points scored to the Indiana Pacers in a 177–135 defeat. As of March 27, 2025, it remains the highest-scoring effort the Pacers have ever had either in the ABA or the NBA (with their most recent highest-scoring game in the NBA occurring on March 27, 2025, with a 162–109 blowout win over the Washington Wizards). The team finished 8th in points per game (112.4 per game) and points allowed (117 per game). After the season, the team was bought by Haven Industries, Inc. - the owners of the "Jack Frost" brand of sugar products. Subsequently, they decided to rebrand the team as the Pittsburgh Condors for the 1970 season.

== Roster ==
1969–70 Pittsburgh Pipers roster
Players

Pos.	No.	Player	Height	Weight	DOB	From
PF	15	Larry Bergh	6 ft 8 in (2.03 m)	210 lb (95 kg)	April 2, 1945	Weber State
SF	23, 45	John Brisker	6 ft 5 in (1.96 m)	210 lb (95 kg)	June 15, 1947	Toledo
SG	34	Steve Chubin	6 ft 2 in (1.88 m)	200 lb (91 kg)	February 8, 1944	Rhode Island
PF	13	Warren Davis	6 ft 6 in (1.98 m)	212 lb (96 kg)	June 30, 1943	North Carolina A&T
PF	12	Dennis Hamilton	6 ft 8 in (2.03 m)	210 lb (95 kg)	May 8, 1944	Arizona State
F	12	Art Heyman	6 ft 5 in (1.96 m)	205 lb (93 kg)	June 24, 1941	Duke
PF	13	Stew Johnson	6 ft 8 in (2.03 m)	220 lb (100 kg)	August 19, 1944	Murray State
PG	14	Arvesta Kelly	6 ft 2 in (1.88 m)	175 lb (79 kg)	November 20, 1945	Lincoln (MO)
F	35	Wilbur Kirkland	6 ft 7 in (2.01 m)	190 lb (86 kg)	1947	Cheyney
C	24	Mike Lewis	6 ft 8 in (2.03 m)	225 lb (102 kg)	March 18, 1946	Duke
SF	15	Lonnie Lynn	6 ft 7 in (2.01 m)	215 lb (98 kg)	May 24, 1943	Wilberforce
C		Bill McGill	6 ft 9 in (2.06 m)	225 lb (102 kg)	September 16, 1939	Utah
SG	34	Maurice McHartley	6 ft 3 in (1.91 m)	185 lb (84 kg)	August 1, 1942	North Carolina A&T
PG	22	Barry Orms	6 ft 3 in (1.91 m)	190 lb (86 kg)	May 1, 1946	Saint Louis
C	21	Craig Raymond	6 ft 11 in (2.11 m)	235 lb (107 kg)	April 5, 1945	BYU
C		John Smith	7 ft 0 in (2.13 m)	235 lb (107 kg)	May 24, 1944	CSU Pueblo
SG	11	Justus Thigpen	6 ft 1 in (1.85 m)	160 lb (73 kg)	August 13, 1947	Weber State
SG	25	George Thompson	6 ft 2 in (1.88 m)	200 lb (91 kg)	November 29, 1947	Marquette
PG	22	Steve Vacendak	6 ft 1 in (1.85 m)	185 lb (84 kg)	August 15, 1944	Duke
SG	10	Chico Vaughn	6 ft 2 in (1.88 m)	190 lb (86 kg)	February 19, 1940	Southern Illinois
PF	32	Trooper Washington	6 ft 7 in (2.01 m)	215 lb (98 kg)	April 21, 1944	Cheyney
PG	44	Charlie Williams	6 ft 0 in (1.83 m)	165 lb (75 kg)	September 5, 1943	Seattle

Coaches
Head coach
- John Clark
  Buddy Jeannette

Legend
- (DP) Unsigned draft pick
- (FA) Free agent
- (S) Suspended
- Injured

Roster

== Final standings ==
=== Eastern Division ===
Eastern Division	W	L	PCT	GB
Indiana Pacers *	59	25	.702	-
Kentucky Colonels *	45	39	.536	14.0
Carolina Cougars *	42	42	.500	17.0
New York Nets *	39	45	.464	20.0
Pittsburgh Pipers	29	55	.345	30.0
Miami Floridians	23	61	.274	36.0

== Awards and honors ==
1970 ABA All-Star Game selections (game played on January 24, 1970)

- Charlie Williams
