= Charlie Williams (basketball) =

American basketball player

Personal information
- Born: September 5, 1943 (age 83) Colorado Springs, Colorado, U.S.
- Listed height: 6 ft 0 in (1.83 m)
- Listed weight: 165 lb (75 kg)

Career information
- High school: Stadium (Tacoma, Washington)
- College: Seattle (1962–1965)
- NBA draft: 1965: undrafted
- Playing career: 1967–1973
- Position: Point guard / shooting guard
- Number: 44, 10, 32

Career history
- 1967–1970: Pittsburgh/Minnesota Pipers / Pittsburgh Condors
- 1970–1972: Memphis Pros / Tams
- 1973: Utah Stars

Career highlights
- ABA champion (1968); 2× ABA All-Star (1969, 1970); All-ABA 1st Team (1968)
- Stats at Basketball Reference

Charles E. Williams (born September 5, 1943) is an American former professional basketball player born in Colorado Springs, Colorado. A 6’0” guard from Stadium High School (Tacoma) and Seattle University, he played in the American Basketball Association (which later joined the NBA in the ABA-NBA merger) in the late 1960s and early 1970s. The highlight of his career was in 1968, when he teamed with Connie Hawkins to lead the Pittsburgh Pipers to the 1968 ABA Championship. Williams also played in the 1969 and 1970 ABA All-Star Games. He retired in 1973 with 6,020 total points and a career scoring average of 16.2 points per game.

== Career statistics ==
Legend
GP	Games played	GS	Games started	MPG	Minutes per game
FG%	Field goal percentage	3P%	3-point field goal percentage	FT%	Free throw percentage
RPG	Rebounds per game	APG	Assists per game	SPG	Steals per game
BPG	Blocks per game	PPG	Points per game	**Bold**	Career high
*	Led the league

†	Denotes seasons in which Williams's team won an ABA championship

=== ABA ===
==== Regular season ====
Year	Team	GP	GS	MPG	FG%	3P%	FT%	RPG	APG	PPG
1967–68†	Pittsburgh	78		**39.0**	.408	.287	.676	**4.8**	2.2	**20.8**
1968–69	Minnesota	66		34.6	.373	**.311**	.710	3.7	2.5	18.7
1969–70	Pittsburgh	26		35.6	.359	.213	**.770**	3.0	3.6	19.5
1970–71	Pittsburgh	**32***		30.4	**.421**	.270	.704	2.6	4.0	14.8
1970–71	Memphis	**56***		22.7	.406	.232	.699	2.3	2.2	13.7
1971–72	Memphis	82		31.5	.382	.236	.744	2.8	3.1	15.8
1972–73	Memphis	10		21.9	.333	.214	.731	1.2	**4.2**	7.2
1972–73	Utah	22		6.9	.300	.000	.710	.3	.8	2.1
Career		372		30.8	.390	.264	.713	3.1	2.7	16.2
All-Star		2	0	6.0	.143	.000	1.000	.0	1.0	2.0

==== Playoffs ====
Year	Team	GP	MPG	FG%	3P%	FT%	RPG	APG	PPG
1968†	Pittsburgh	**15**	**41.7**	**.432**	.171	**.732**	**4.3**	**2.5**	**23.7**
1969	Minnesota	7	36.4	.366	.289	.692	3.4	2.0	17.1
1971	Memphis	4	32.3	.419	**.333**	.722	3.5	2.0	19.3
1973	Utah	4	3.0	.200	–	–	.3	.3	.5
Career		30	34.1	.414	.241	.719	3.4	2.0	18.5

== See also ==
- List of people banned or suspended by the NBA
