= Vince Cazzetta =

American basketball coach

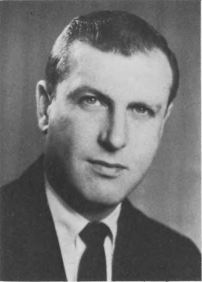
- Cazzetta in the 1958–59 season.

Personal information
- Born: September 24, 1925 New Britain, Connecticut, U.S.
- Died: May 4, 2005 (aged 79) Hartford, Connecticut, U.S.

Career information
- High school: New Britain (New Britain, Connecticut)
- College: Bridgeport

Career history

Coaching
- 1956–1958: Seattle (assistant)
- 1958–1963: Seattle
- 1963–1967: Rhode Island (assistant)
- 1967–1968: Pittsburgh Pipers

Career highlights
- ABA champion (1968); ABA Coach of the Year (1968)

Vincent C. Cazzetta (September 24, 1925 – May 4, 2005) was an American basketball coach. As coach of the Pittsburgh Pipers in the inaugural season of the American Basketball Association, he led the team to the championship, the first and only championship for a major basketball team in the city.

== Early life ==
Cazzetta was raised in New Britain, Connecticut. He served in the 95th Infantry of the United States Army in World War II, fighting in the Battle of the Bulge. He later attended Arnold College (later known as Bridgeport University) and graduated in 1950. He obtained a master's degree from Columbia. He became a football coach at Massachusetts and Connecticut high schools.

== Coaching career ==
Cazzetta was promoted to replace John Castellani as head coach at Seattle in 1959, where the team had received a two-year postseason ban due to NCAA violations. He ranked second in school history with a .711 winning percentage and 96 wins. On February 7, 1963, he resigned as coach with nine games left in the season after a dispute with management. Athletic director Eddie O'Brien had refused to give Cazzetta total control of the program in terms of scheduling and budget and the faculty board sided with O'Brien, which led Cazzetta to cite "willful interference" by O'Brien as his reason for leaving; Cazzetta's son later stated that his father was fired after committing an infraction by purchasing a plane ticket home for a player from Washington, D.C. on Christmas..

Cazzetta moved on to become an assistant coach at the University of Rhode Island from 1963 to 1967.

Cazzetta became head coach of the fledgling Pittsburgh Pipers during the ABA's first season. He made major changes to the roster throughout the season; at the end of the season the team only had four players who had been there at the start of the season. His personality as a coach was cited as a key reason the team pulled together and won the championship. During the season the Pipers had winning streaks of 15 and 12 games and won 18 out of 19 games at one point. The Pipers won the 1968 ABA Championship in seven games over the New Orleans Buccaneers. Cazzetta was the ABA's Coach of the Year for the 1967–68 season.

As it turned out, the Game 7 win on May 4 was his final game as a coach. The Pipers were soon on the block to relocate to Minnesota, as the state had lost the Minnesota Muskies to a group that bought and moved them to Miami. With the league not wanting a bad look on having league offices in Minnesota without a team, efforts were done to have a chunk of the Pipers bought and then relocated. Cazzetta resigned as coach of the Pipers after team owner Gabe Rubin refused to grant him a raise (specifically a $10,000 raise and $2,000 in moving expenses) in order to help move his wife and six children, as the franchise was leaving Pittsburgh to become the Minnesota Pipers. Rubin, incensed by Cazetta leaving, went on to call him a "nobody" where the team won in spite of him. As it turned out, the owners' refusal and move were both mistakes, with the team returning to Pittsburgh as the Pipers after only one season in Minnesota. Cazzetta was replaced as the Pipers' head coach by Jim Harding of LaSalle College. Cazzetta, asked years later about the departure, stated, "Selfishly, I wish I had gone. But I don't regret it from a family standpoint."

For his efforts as a coach, he was inducted into the Connecticut High School Coaches Hall of Fame and the New Britain Sports Hall of Fame.

== Later life ==
Cazzetta worked a variety of jobs after leaving the Pipers, serving as a sales representative for shoe companies (Converse and later Puma) before becoming a professor in the Sports Management department at the University of Massachusetts.

He was later a scout for the Minnesota Timberwolves and Toronto Raptors.

== Personal life ==
Cazzetta died in 2005 in Hartford, Connecticut at the age of 79 on May 4, 2005.

== Head coaching record ==
Record table
Season	Team	Overall	Conference	Standing	Postseason
Seattle Chieftains (Independent) (1958–1963)
1958–59	Seattle	21–6			
1959–60	Seattle	16–10			
1960–61	Seattle	18–8			NCAA University Division first round
1961–62	Seattle	18–9			NCAA University Division first round
1962–63	Seattle	21–6			NCAA University Division first round
Seattle:		94–39 (.707)			
Total:		94–39 (.707)			

=== ABA ===
*	Record

Legend
Regular season	G	Games coached	W	Games won	L	Games lost	W–L %	Win–loss %
Playoffs	PG	Playoff games	PW	Playoff wins	PL	Playoff losses	PW–L %	Playoff win–loss %

Team	Year	G	W	L	W–L%	Finish	PG	PW	PL	PW–L%	Result
Pittsburgh	1967–68	78	54	24	.692	1st in Eastern	15	11	4	.733	Won ABA Finals
Total ABA		78	54	24	.692*		15	11	4	.733*	
