= Barry Orms =

American basketball player

Personal information
- Born: May 1, 1946 (age 80) St. Louis, Missouri, U.S.
- Listed height: 6 ft 3 in (1.91 m)
- Listed weight: 190 lb (86 kg)

Career information
- High school: Beaumont (St. Louis, Missouri)
- College: Saint Louis (1965–1968)
- NBA draft: 1968: 8th round, 96th overall pick
- Drafted by: Baltimore Bullets
- Playing career: 1968–1970
- Position: Point guard
- Number: 33, 22

Career history
- 1968–1969: Baltimore Bullets
- 1969: Indiana Pacers
- 1969–1970: Pittsburgh Pipers

Career NBA and ABA statistics
- Points: 882 (6.3 ppg)
- Rebounds: 505 (3.6 rpg)
- Assists: 181 (1.3 apg)
- Stats at NBA.com
- Stats at Basketball Reference

Barry D. Orms (born May 1, 1946) is an American former professional basketball player. He was born in St. Louis, Missouri. He played college basketball for the Saint Louis Billikens.

A 6-foot-3-inch (1.91 m) point guard from Saint Louis University, Orms was selected by the Baltimore Bullets in the eighth round of the 1968 NBA draft. He played one season with the Bullets, averaging 2.8 points per game. Orms then jumped to the American Basketball Association, where he increased his scoring average to 9.1 points per game in one season with the Indiana Pacers and Pittsburgh Pipers. As a playwright, Mr. Orms wrote "Bones", a play that emphasis basketball and religion.

== Career statistics ==
Legend
GP	Games played	GS	Games started	MPG	Minutes per game
FG%	Field goal percentage	3P%	3-point field goal percentage	FT%	Free throw percentage
RPG	Rebounds per game	APG	Assists per game	SPG	Steals per game
BPG	Blocks per game	PPG	Points per game	**Bold**	Career high

=== NBA/ABA ===
==== Regular season ====
Year	Team	GP	MPG	FG%	3P%	FT%	RPG	APG	PPG
1968–69	Baltimore (NBA)	64	14.3	.309		.483	2.5	.8	2.8
1969–70	Indiana (ABA)	9	15.9	**.425**	.000	**.654**	4.1	1.4	5.7
1969–70	Pittsburgh (ABA)	**68**	**28.6**	.389	**.217**	.540	**4.6**	**1.8**	**9.6**
Career (ABA)		77	27.2	.391	.192	.551	4.5	1.7	9.1
Career (overall)		141	21.3	.370	.192	.539	3.6	1.3	6.3

==== Playoffs ====
Year	Team	GP	MPG	FG%	FT%	RPG	APG	PPG
1969	Baltimore (NBA)	3	3.3	–	–	.3	.0	.0
