= Mike Lewis (basketball) =

American basketball player

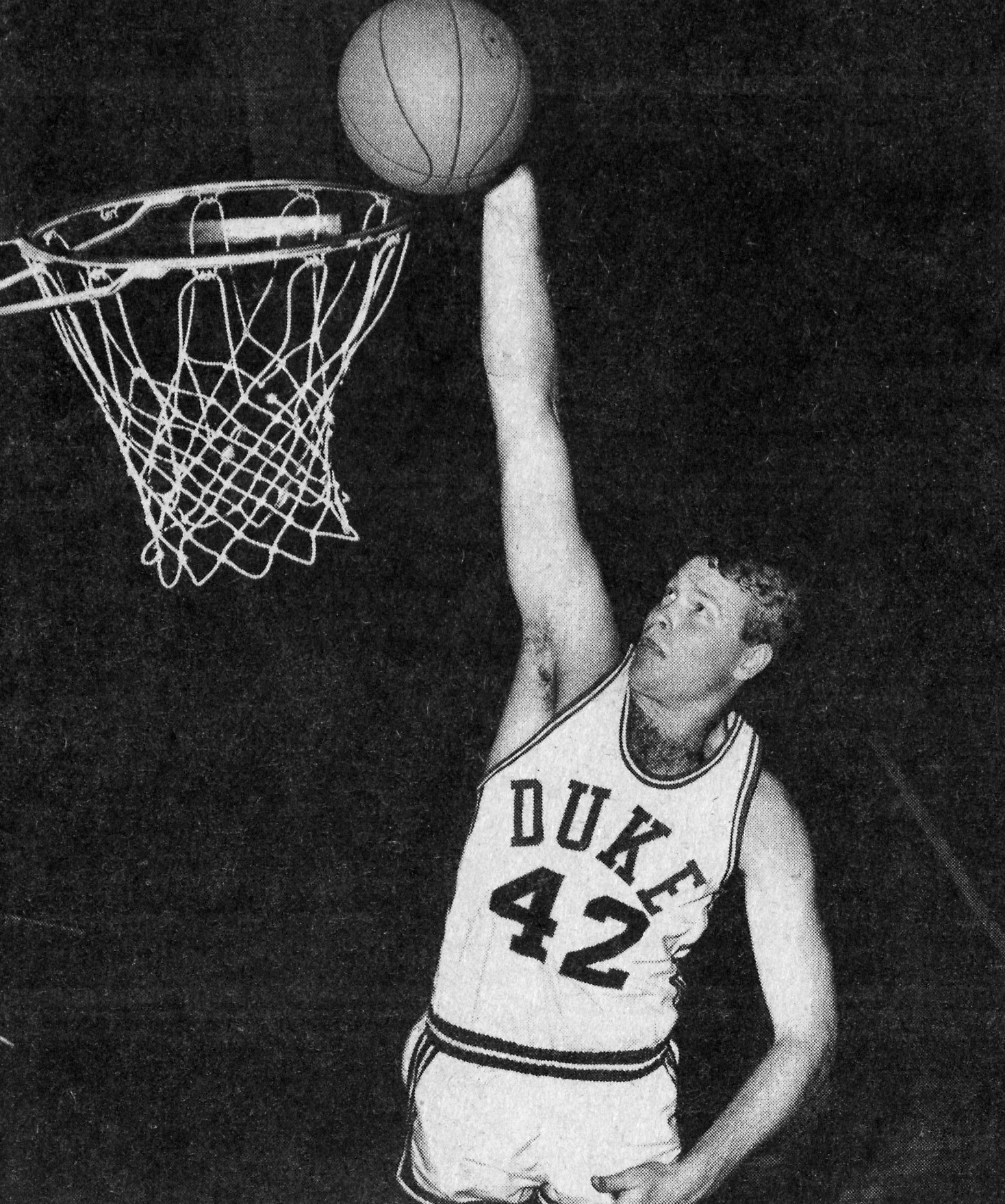
- Lewis with Duke in 1967

Personal information
- Born: March 18, 1946 (age 80) Missoula, Montana, U.S.
- Listed height: 6 ft 8 in (2.03 m)
- Listed weight: 225 lb (102 kg)

Career information
- High school: Missoula (Missoula, Montana)
- College: Duke (1965–1968)
- NBA draft: 1968: 7th round, 88th overall pick
- Drafted by: Boston Celtics
- Playing career: 1968–1974
- Position: Power forward / center
- Number: 42, 24

Career history
- 1968: Indiana Pacers
- 1968–1972: Minnesota Pipers / Pittsburgh Condors
- 1972–1974: Carolina Cougars

Career highlights
- 2× ABA All-Star (1970, 1971); Third-team All-American – AP, NABC, UPI (1968); First-team All-ACC (1968); Second-team All-ACC (1967); First-team Parade All-American (1964)

Career ABA statistics
- Points: 4,081 (12.1 ppg)
- Rebounds: 4,022 (11.9 rpg)
- Assists: 1,000 (3.0 apg)
- Stats at Basketball Reference

Michael J. Lewis (born March 18, 1946) is an American former professional basketball player.

A 6'8" power forward/center from Duke University, Lewis played in the American Basketball Association from 1968 to 1974 as a member of the Indiana Pacers, Minnesota Pipers, Pittsburgh Pipers, Pittsburgh Condors, and Carolina Cougars. He averaged 12.1 points per game and 11.9 rebounds per game for his career and made two ABA All-Star Game appearances, in 1970 and 1971. His career was cut short by an Achilles tendon injury.

== Career statistics ==
Legend
GP	Games played	GS	Games started	MPG	Minutes per game
FG%	Field goal percentage	3P%	3-point field goal percentage	FT%	Free throw percentage
RPG	Rebounds per game	APG	Assists per game	SPG	Steals per game
BPG	Blocks per game	PPG	Points per game	**Bold**	Career high

=== ABA ===
==== Regular season ====
Year	Team	GP	GS	MPG	FG%	3P%	FT%	RPG	APG	SPG	BPG	PPG
1968–69	Indiana	24	–	19.0	.460	.000	.691	7.5	1.2	–	–	8.2
1968–69	Minnesota	52	–	22.3	.427	.000	.635	8.7	1.5	–	–	8.7
1969–70	Pittsburgh Pipers	78	–	**34.6**	.496	–	.756	13.5	3.4	–	–	**16.2**
1970–71	Pittsburgh Condors	**83**	–	33.0	.509	–	.768	**14.6**	3.2	–	–	13.0
1971–72	Pittsburgh Condors	82	–	31.9	**.540**	–	.730	12.1	**3.9**	–	–	11.4
1972–73	Carolina	15	–	28.7	.496	–	**.805**	8.1	2.7	–	–	10.1
1973–74	Carolina	3	–	4.7	.375	–	–	1.7	.0	.0	.0	2.0
Career		337	–	30.0	.498	.000	.735	11.9	3.0	.0	.0	12.1
All-Star		2	0	11.5	.250	–	.667	5.5	1.0	–	–	4.0

==== Playoffs ====
Year	Team	GP	MPG	FG%	3P%	FT%	RPG	APG	PPG
1969	Minnesota	7	18.7	.385	–	.526	6.7	1.6	7.1
