= 1968 ABA playoffs =

Basketball competition

Tournament details
- Dates: March 23 – May 4, 1968
- Season: 1967–68
- Teams: 8

Final positions
- Champions: Pittsburgh Pipers (1st title)
- Runners-up: New Orleans Buccaneers
- Semifinalists: Minnesota Muskies; Dallas Chaparrals

The 1968 ABA playoffs was the postseason tournament following the American Basketball Association's inaugural 1967–68 season, starting on March 23 and ending on May 4. The tournament concluded with the Eastern Division champion Pittsburgh Pipers defeating the Western Division champion New Orleans Buccaneers, four games to three in the ABA Finals.

== Notable events ==
This was the first ABA championship.

The Pittsburgh Pipers won the ABA championship in the playoffs after posting the league's best record during the regular season (54–24, .692). The Minnesota Muskies had the league's second best record, but they played in the Eastern Division with the Pipers.

None of the four teams that made it to the Division finals (and ABA finals) remained as they were during this season throughout the league's entire existence. The Pittsburgh Pipers spent the following season as the Minnesota Pipers, returned to play as the Pittsburgh Pipers the year after that, and then played two seasons as the Pittsburgh Condors before folding in 1972. After three seasons the New Orleans Buccaneers left town and became the Memphis Pros in 1970. The Minnesota Muskies spent the next two seasons as the Miami Floridians and then spent two seasons after that as The Floridians before folding in 1972. The Dallas Chaparrals eventually became the San Antonio Spurs, continuing to this day in the NBA.

The Kentucky Colonels won the last Eastern Division playoff berth in a one-game playoff over the New Jersey Americans by forfeit when the venue chosen by the Americans, Commack Arena, had an unplayable floor.

Connie Hawkins of the Pittsburgh Pipers was the Most Valuable Player of the ABA playoffs.

== Bracket ==
Division Semifinals
1	New Orleans Buccaneers*	3
3	Denver Rockets	2
Western Division
4	Houston Mavericks	0
2	Dallas Chaparrals	3
1	Pittsburgh Pipers*	3
3	Indiana Pacers	0
Eastern Division
4	Kentucky Colonels	2
2	Minnesota Muskies	3

Division Finals
1	New Orleans Bucs*	4
2	Dallas Chaparrals	1
1	Pittsburgh Pipers*	4
2	Minnesota Muskies	1

ABA Finals
W1	New Orleans Bucs*	3
E1	Pittsburgh Pipers*	4

* Division winner
Bold Series winner
Italic Team with home-court advantage

== Division Semifinals ==
=== Eastern Division Semifinals ===
==== (1) Pittsburgh Pipers vs. (3) Indiana Pacers ====
March 25

Boxscore

Indiana Pacers 127, Pittsburgh Pipers 146
Scoring by quarter: 31–35, 32–36, 30–33, 34–42
Pts: Roger Brown 32; Rebs: Roger Brown 12	Pts: Connie Hawkins 38; Rebs: Trooper Washington 20
Pittsburgh leads series, 1–0

Civic Arena, Pittsburgh, Pennsylvania
Attendance: 2,189

March 26

Boxscore

Indiana Pacers 108, Pittsburgh Pipers 121
Scoring by quarter: 30–23, 29–24, 33–28, 29–33
Pts: Freddie Lewis 21; Rebs: Ollie Darden 16	Pts: Art Heyman 32; Rebs: Trooper Washington 15
Pittsburgh leads series, 2–0

Civic Arena, Pittsburgh, Pennsylvania
Attendance: 3,684

March 27

Boxscore

Pittsburgh Pipers 133, Indiana Pacers 114
Scoring by quarter: 26–26, 30–29, 27–48, 31–30
Pts: Charlie Williams 34; Rebs: Connie Hawkins 15	Pts: Freddie Lewis 32; Rebs: George Peeples 20
Pittsburgh wins series, 3–0

Indiana State Fair Coliseum, Indianapolis, Indiana
Attendance: 3,141

Regular-season series
Pittsburgh won 6–4 in the regular-season series

November 7, 1967

Report

Indiana Pacers 100, Pittsburgh Pipers 83

Civic Arena, Pittsburgh

November 16, 1967

Report

Pittsburgh Pipers 116, Indiana Pacers 90

Indiana Farmers Coliseum, Indianapolis

December 3, 1967

Report

Indiana Pacers 100, Pittsburgh Pipers 103

Civic Arena, Pittsburgh

December 16, 1967

Report

Pittsburgh Pipers 122, Indiana Pacers 117

Indiana Farmers Coliseum, Indianapolis

December 31, 1967

Report

Indiana Pacers 106, Pittsburgh Pipers 121

Civic Arena, Pittsburgh

January 11, 1968

Report

Indiana Pacers 115, Pittsburgh Pipers 138

Civic Arena, Pittsburgh

January 13, 1968

Report

Pittsburgh Pipers 99, Indiana Pacers 113

Indiana Farmers Coliseum, Indianapolis

January 17, 1968

Report

Pittsburgh Pipers 137, Indiana Pacers 101

Indiana Farmers Coliseum, Indianapolis

January 31, 1968

Report

Pittsburgh Pipers 113, Indiana Pacers 119

Indiana Farmers Coliseum, Indianapolis

February 6, 1968

Report

Indiana Pacers 113, Pittsburgh Pipers 100

Civic Arena, Pittsburgh

This was the first playoff meeting between the Pipers and the Pacers.

==== (2) Minnesota Muskies vs. (4) Kentucky Colonels ====
March 24

Boxscore

Kentucky Colonels 102, Minnesota Muskies 115
Scoring by quarter: 22–28, 27–30, 37–27, 16–30
Pts: Darel Carrier 29; Rebs: Carrier, Ligon, Rhine 8 each	Pts: Mel Daniels 44; Rebs: Mel Daniels 15
Minnesota leads series, 1–0

Metropolitan Sports Center, Bloomington, Minnesota
Attendance: 661

March 26

Boxscore

Kentucky Colonels 100, Minnesota Muskies 95
Scoring by quarter: 26–25, 22–31, 22–20, 30–19
Pts: Louie Dampier 24; Rebs: Jim Caldwell 21	Pts: Donnie Freeman 30; Rebs: Daniels, Freeman, Hunter, Smith 8 each
Series tied, 1–1

Metropolitan Sports Center, Bloomington, Minnesota
Attendance: 3,874

March 27

Boxscore

Minnesota Muskies 116, Kentucky Colonels 107
Scoring by quarter: 26–30, 36–29, 33–18, 21–30
Pts: Les Hunter 38; Rebs: Les Hunter 21	Pts: Louie Dampier 32; Rebs: Jim Caldwell 9
Minnesota leads series, 2–1

Louisville Convention Center, Louisville, Kentucky
Attendance: 1,458

March 29

Boxscore

Minnesota Muskies 86, Kentucky Colonels 94
Scoring by quarter: 24–25, 22–22, 21–25, 19–22
Pts: Daniels, Smith 22 each Rebs: Mel Daniels 22	Pts: Darel Carrier 29; Rebs: Jim Ligon 21
Series tied, 2–2

Louisville Convention Center, Louisville, Kentucky
Attendance: 4,472

March 30

Boxscore

Kentucky Colonels 108, Minnesota Muskies 114
Scoring by quarter: 23–30, 28–34, 25–22, 32–28
Pts: Louie Dampier 33; Rebs: Jim Caldwell 11	Pts: Ervin Inniger 33; Rebs: Mel Daniels 19
Minnesota wins series, 3–2

Metropolitan Sports Center, Bloomington, Minnesota
Attendance: 879

A whopping crowd of less than 900 people saw Minnesota dominate the Colonels for most of the game, having led since breaking a 6–6 tie; they led 64–51 at halftime.

The Muskies had a 15-point lead with four minutes remaining before the Colonels chipped it away to five with 1:30 to go before a missed three by Louie Dampier saw the Muskies close it out with late points.

Regular-season series
Tied 5–5 in the regular-season series

October 22, 1967

Report

Kentucky Colonels 104, Minnesota Muskies 96

Met Center, Bloomington

October 29, 1967

Report

Kentucky Colonels 81, Minnesota Muskies 94

Met Center, Bloomington

November 8, 1967

Report

Minnesota Muskies 106, Kentucky Colonels 92

Louisville Convention Center, Louisville

November 14, 1967

Report

Kentucky Colonels 75, Minnesota Muskies 125

Met Center, Bloomington

December 12, 1967

Report

Minnesota Muskies 94, Kentucky Colonels 113

Louisville Convention Center, Louisville

January 8, 1968

Report

Minnesota Muskies 103, Kentucky Colonels 107

Louisville Convention Center, Louisville

January 23, 1968

Report

Kentucky Colonels 97, Minnesota Muskies 120

Met Center, Bloomington

February 2, 1968

Report

Minnesota Muskies 84, Kentucky Colonels 120

Louisville Convention Center, Louisville

February 5, 1968

Report

Minnesota Muskies 86, Kentucky Colonels 95

Louisville Convention Center, Louisville

February 27, 1968

Report

Kentucky Colonels 93, Minnesota Muskies 102

Met Center, Bloomington

This was the first playoff meeting between the Muskies and the Colonels.

=== Western Division Semifinals ===
==== (1) New Orleans Buccaneers vs. (3) Denver Rockets ====
March 26

Boxscore

Denver Rockets 104, New Orleans Buccaneers 130
Scoring by quarter: 23–39, 29–27, 27–27, 25–37
Pts: Larry Jones 29; Rebs: Wayne Hightower 12	Pts: Larry Brown 31; Rebs: Red Robbins 15
New Orleans leads series, 1–0

Loyola Field House, New Orleans, Louisiana
Attendance: 3,111

March 27

Boxscore

Denver Rockets 93, New Orleans Buccaneers 105
Scoring by quarter: 28–23, 18–23, 17–30, 30–29
Pts: Willie Murrell 21; Rebs: Byron Beck 15	Pts: Jimmy Jones 22; Rebs: Moe, Govan 11 each
New Orleans leads series, 2–0

Loyola Field House, New Orleans, Louisiana
Attendance: 3,622

March 30

Boxscore

New Orleans Buccaneers 98, Denver Rockets 105
Scoring by quarter: 22–26, 25–21, 28–34, 23–24
Pts: Doug Moe 22; Rebs: Moe, Robbins 12 each	Pts: Wayne Hightower 28; Rebs: Willie Murrell 11
New Orleans leads series, 2–1

Denver Auditorium Arena, Denver, Colorado
Attendance: 13,359

March 31

Boxscore

New Orleans Buccaneers 100, Denver Rockets 108
Scoring by quarter: 32–27, 20–27, 23–25, 25–29
Pts: Doug Moe 27; Rebs: Doug Moe 8	Pts: Willie Murrell 28; Rebs: Byron Beck 18
Series tied, 2–2

Denver Auditorium Arena, Denver, Colorado
Attendance: 3,485

April 3

Boxscore

Denver Rockets 97, New Orleans Buccaneers 102
Scoring by quarter: 25–22, 22–21, 26–37, 24–22
Pts: Willie Murrell 26; Rebs: Murrell, Hammond, Beck 9 each	Pts: Larry Brown 24; Rebs: Doug Moe 12
New Orleans wins series, 3–2

Loyola Field House, New Orleans, Louisiana
Attendance: 6,500

In front of a standout crowd of over 6,000 in New Orleans, the Buccaneers rode a third quarter surge to win the series.

Regular-season series
Tied 5–5 in the regular-season series

November 11, 1967

Report

Denver Rockets 107, New Orleans Buccaneers 131

Loyola Field House, New Orleans

November 21, 1967

Report

Denver Rockets 90, New Orleans Buccaneers 107

Loyola Field House, New Orleans

December 15, 1967

Report

New Orleans Buccaneers 100, Denver Rockets 93

Denver Auditorium Arena, Denver

January 4, 1968

Report

New Orleans Buccaneers 107, Denver Rockets 122

Denver Auditorium Arena, Denver

January 18, 1968

Report

New Orleans Buccaneers 97, Denver Rockets 126

Denver Auditorium Arena, Denver

January 26, 1968

Report

Denver Rockets 104, New Orleans Buccaneers 97

Loyola Field House, New Orleans

February 4, 1968

Report

New Orleans Buccaneers 105, Denver Rockets 100

Denver Auditorium Arena, Denver

February 11, 1968

Report

Denver Rockets 90, New Orleans Buccaneers 98

Loyola Field House, New Orleans

February 23, 1968

Report

Denver Rockets 108, New Orleans Buccaneers 102

Loyola Field House, New Orleans

March 18, 1968

Report

New Orleans Buccaneers 101, Denver Rockets 108

Denver Auditorium Arena, Denver

This was the first playoff meeting between the Buccaneers and the Rockets.

==== (2) Dallas Chaparrals vs. (4) Houston Mavericks ====
March 23

Boxscore

Houston Mavericks 110, Dallas Chaparrals 111
Scoring by quarter: 18–29, 34–34, 29–27, 29–21
Pts: Willie Somerset 42; Rebs: Willie Somerset 11	Pts: John Beasley 28; Rebs: John Beasley 18
Dallas leads series, 1–0

Moody Coliseum, University Park, Texas
Attendance: 1,857

In the very first ever ABA playoff game, Jerry Pettway missed a free throw attempt with ten seconds remaining as Dallas held on to win by one point.

March 25

Boxscore

Dallas Chaparrals 97, Houston Mavericks 115
Scoring by quarter: 24–25, 34–16, 20–24, 27–32
Pts: Charlie Beasley 27	Pts: Willie Somerset 40
Dallas leads series, 2–0

Sam Houston Coliseum, Houston, Texas
Attendance: 891

Mavericks player-coach Slater Martin got into a shoving match near the end of the game and the police were called, but strangely enough, a foul was not called on Martin as the Chaparrals inched closer to a series victory.

March 26

Boxscore

Houston Mavericks 103, Dallas Chaparrals 116
Scoring by quarter: 25–24, 15–35, 31–31, 32–26
Pts: Art Becker 26; Rebs: Art Becker 10	Pts: John Beasley 31; Rebs: Elton McGriff 14
Dallas wins series, 3–0

Moody Coliseum, University Park, Texas
Attendance: 3,117

Dallas rode a dominant second quarter to a series victory.

Regular-season series
Dallas won 8–2 in the regular-season series

October 23, 1967

Report

Dallas Chaparrals 100, Houston Mavericks 83

Sam Houston Coliseum, Houston

November 17, 1967

Report

Houston Mavericks 107, Dallas Chaparrals 116

Dallas Memorial Auditorium, Dallas

November 19, 1967

Report

Dallas Chaparrals 100, Houston Mavericks 94

Sam Houston Coliseum, Houston

January 12, 1968

Report

Houston Mavericks 99, Dallas Chaparrals 107

Dallas Memorial Auditorium, Dallas

January 19, 1968

Report

Houston Mavericks 92, Dallas Chaparrals 102

Dallas Memorial Auditorium, Dallas

January 26, 1968

Report

Houston Mavericks 96, Dallas Chaparrals 122

Dallas Memorial Auditorium, Dallas

February 18, 1968

Report

Dallas Chaparrals 93, Houston Mavericks 110

Sam Houston Coliseum, Houston

February 21, 1968

Report

Dallas Chaparrals 122, Houston Mavericks 119

Sam Houston Coliseum, Houston

February 29, 1968

Report

Dallas Chaparrals 100, Houston Mavericks 101

Sam Houston Coliseum, Houston

March 8, 1968

Report

Houston Mavericks 116, Dallas Chaparrals 117

Dallas Memorial Auditorium, Dallas

This was the first playoff meeting between the Chaparrals and the Mavericks.

== Division Finals ==
=== Eastern Division Finals ===
==== (1) Pittsburgh Pipers vs. (2) Minnesota Muskies ====
April 4

Boxscore

Minnesota Muskies 117, Pittsburgh Pipers 125
Scoring by quarter: 31–27, 30–25, 17–42, 39–31
Pts: Mel Daniels 28; Rebs: Mel Daniels 18	Pts: Art Heyman 34; Rebs: Connie Hawkins 15
Pittsburgh leads series, 1–0

Civic Arena, Pittsburgh, Pennsylvania
Attendance: 3,159

April 6

Boxscore

Minnesota Muskies 137, Pittsburgh Pipers 123
Scoring by quarter: 30–28, 24–28, 41–38, 42–29
Pts: Hunter, Daniels 38 each Rebs: Mel Daniels 27	Pts: Williams, Hawkins 27 each Rebs: Trooper Washington 35
Series tied, 1–1

Civic Arena, Pittsburgh, Pennsylvania
Attendance: 2,123

April 10

Boxscore

Pittsburgh Pipers 107, Minnesota Muskies 99
Scoring by quarter: 22–29, 31–21, 26–24, 28–25
Pts: Connie Hawkins 32	Pts: Les Hunter 27
Pittsburgh leads series, 2–1

Metropolitan Sports Center, Bloomington, Minnesota
Attendance: 8,357

April 13

Boxscore

Pittsburgh Pipers 117, Minnesota Muskies 108
Scoring by quarter: 29–28, 28–30, 24–27, 36–23
Pts: Connie Hawkins 38	Pts: Skip Thoren 22
Pittsburgh leads series, 3–1

Metropolitan Sports Center, Bloomington, Minnesota
Attendance: 3,787

April 14

Boxscore

Minnesota Muskies 105, Pittsburgh Pipers 114
Scoring by quarter: 22–28, 25–28, 26–29, 32–29
Pts: Donnie Freeman 23; Rebs: Skip Thoren 13; Asts: Donnie Freeman 11	Pts: Connie Hawkins 24; Rebs: Leroy Wright 17
Pittsburgh wins series, 4–1

Civic Arena, Pittsburgh, Pennsylvania
Attendance: 3,350

With low attendance being noted in the press, the future of the Muskies in Minnesota was raised after the end of the game; the team ultimately moved to Miami.

Regular-season series
Pittsburgh won 7–4 in the regular-season series

October 24, 1967

Report

Minnesota Muskies 104, Pittsburgh Pipers 86

Civic Arena, Pittsburgh

November 9, 1967

Report

Minnesota Muskies 86, Pittsburgh Pipers 97

Civic Arena, Pittsburgh

November 23, 1967

Report

Pittsburgh Pipers 75, Minnesota Muskies 101

Met Center, Bloomington, Minnesota

December 10, 1967

Report

Pittsburgh Pipers 114, Minnesota Muskies 99

Met Center, Bloomington, Minnesota

December 17, 1967

Report

Pittsburgh Pipers 121, Minnesota Muskies 116 (OT)

Met Center, Bloomington, Minnesota

January 12, 1968

Report

Pittsburgh Pipers 103, Minnesota Muskies 120

Met Center, Bloomington, Minnesota

January 26, 1968

Report

Minnesota Muskies 107, Pittsburgh Pipers 115

Civic Arena, Pittsburgh

January 30, 1968

Report

Minnesota Muskies 112, Pittsburgh Pipers 121

Civic Arena, Pittsburgh

February 4, 1968

Report

Pittsburgh Pipers 95, Minnesota Muskies 114

Met Center, Bloomington, Minnesota

February 19, 1968

Report

Pittsburgh Pipers 120, Minnesota Muskies 115

Met Center, Bloomington, Minnesota

February 23, 1968

Report

Minnesota Muskies 102, Pittsburgh Pipers 110

Civic Arena, Pittsburgh

This was the first playoff meeting between these two teams.

=== Western Division Finals ===
==== (1) New Orleans Buccaneers vs. (2) Dallas Chaparrals ====
April 5

Boxscore

Dallas Chaparrals 99, New Orleans Buccaneers 104
Scoring by quarter: 21–27, 26–30, 35–24, 17–23
Pts: John Beasley 27; Rebs: Powell, McGriff 15 each	Pts: Moe, Jones 28 each Rebs: Moe Robbins, Moreland 16 each
New Orleans leads series, 1–0

Loyola Field House, New Orleans, Louisiana
Attendance: 3,332

April 9

Boxscore

Dallas Chaparrals 112, New Orleans Buccaneers 109
Scoring by quarter: 23–23, 26–21, 37–30, 26–35
Pts: Charlie Beasley 31; Rebs: John Beasley 16	Pts: Doug Moe 30; Rebs: Moreland, Govan 10 each
Series tied, 1–1

Loyola Field House, New Orleans, Louisiana
Attendance: 5,287

April 10

Boxscore

New Orleans Buccaneers 110, Dallas Chaparrals 107
Scoring by quarter: 26–24, 28–30, 33–30, 23–23
Pts: Larry Brown 25; Rebs: Gerald Govan 15	Pts: Cincy Powell 33; Rebs: John Beasley 13
New Orleans leads series, 2–1

Dallas Memorial Auditorium, Dallas, Texas
Attendance: 4,825

April 11

Boxscore

New Orleans Buccaneers 119, Dallas Chaparrals 103
Scoring by quarter: 28–24, 34–22, 27–23, 30–34
Pts: Jesse Branson 26; Rebs: Jesse Branson 13	Pts: Maurice McHartley 26; Rebs: Cincy Powell 11
New Orleans leads series, 3–1

Dallas Memorial Auditorium, Dallas, Texas
Attendance: 3,623

April 13

Boxscore

Dallas Chaparrals 107, New Orleans Buccaneers 108
Scoring by quarter: 33–30, 28–29, 22–26, 24–23
Pts: Cincy Powell 27; Rebs: Cincy Powell 14	Pts: Larry Brown 26; Rebs: Jones, Robbins 13 each
New Orleans wins series, 4–1

Loyola Field House, New Orleans, Louisiana
Attendance: 4,614

Regular-season series
New Orleans won 6–4 in the regular-season series

October 27, 1967

Report

Dallas Chaparrals 97, New Orleans Buccaneers 101

Loyola Field House, New Orleans

December 10, 1967

Report

Dallas Chaparrals 110, New Orleans Buccaneers 125

Loyola Field House, New Orleans

December 12, 1967

Report

New Orleans Buccaneers 109, Dallas Chaparrals 105

Dallas Memorial Auditorium, Dallas

December 19, 1967

Report

New Orleans Buccaneers 96, Dallas Chaparrals 93

Dallas Memorial Auditorium, Dallas

January 7, 1968

Report

New Orleans Buccaneers 101, Dallas Chaparrals 113

Dallas Memorial Auditorium, Dallas

January 23, 1968

Report

Dallas Chaparrals 104, New Orleans Buccaneers 112

Loyola Field House, New Orleans

January 24, 1968

Report

Dallas Chaparrals 94, New Orleans Buccaneers 112

Loyola Field House, New Orleans

January 25, 1968

Report

Dallas Chaparrals 102, New Orleans Buccaneers 101

Loyola Field House, New Orleans

February 15, 1968

Report

New Orleans Buccaneers 113, Dallas Chaparrals 121 (OT)

Dallas Memorial Auditorium, Dallas

March 14, 1968

Report

New Orleans Buccaneers 87, Dallas Chaparrals 90

Dallas Memorial Auditorium, Dallas

This was the first playoff meeting between the Buccaneers and the Chaparrals.

== ABA Finals: (W1) New Orleans Buccaneers vs. (E1) Pittsburgh Pipers ==
=== Series summary ===
Game	Date	Away team	Result	Home team
Game 1	April 18	New Orleans Buccaneers	112–120 (0–1)	Pittsburgh Pipers
Game 2	April 20	New Orleans Buccaneers	109–100 (1–1)	Pittsburgh Pipers
Game 3	April 24	Pittsburgh Pipers	101–109 (1–2)	New Orleans Buccaneers
Game 4	April 25	Pittsburgh Pipers	106–105 (OT) (2–2)	New Orleans Buccaneers
Game 5	April 27	New Orleans Buccaneers	111–108 (3–2)	Pittsburgh Pipers
Game 6	May 1	Pittsburgh Pipers	118–112 (3–3)	New Orleans Buccaneers
Game 7	May 4	New Orleans Buccaneers	113–122 (3–4)	Pittsburgh Pipers

=== Series results ===
April 18

Boxscore

New Orleans Buccaneers 112, Pittsburgh Pipers 120
Scoring by quarter: 24–25, 26–35, 35–35, 27–25
Pts: Red Robbins 41; Rebs: Red Robbins 23	Pts: Connie Hawkins 39; Rebs: Washington, Wright 11 each
Pittsburgh leads series, 1–0

Civic Arena, Pittsburgh, Pennsylvania
Attendance: 2,665

Connie Hawkins, already named the league MVP, scored 39 points (28 in the second half, after sitting for multiple minutes in the first half due to foul trouble) while Charlie Williams scored 26 as Pittsburgh led from the close of the first quarter to the end of the game.

April 20

Boxscore

New Orleans Buccaneers 109, Pittsburgh Pipers 100
Scoring by quarter: 22–22, 32–25, 30–24, 25–29
Pts: Larry Brown 28; Rebs: Red Robbins 23	Pts: Chico Vaughn 27; Rebs: Trooper Washington 17
Series tied, 1–1

Civic Arena, Pittsburgh, Pennsylvania
Attendance: 3,877

Larry Brown and Jimmy Jones combined for 52 points while playing tight defense to counter Pittsburgh' fast break that saw Connie Hawkins make just one field goal in the first half on the way to an 18-point performance before fouling out late in the third quarter. The Buccaneers eventually pulled away by the last minutes of the third quarter.

April 24

Boxscore

Pittsburgh Pipers 101, New Orleans Buccaneers 109
Scoring by quarter: 29–19, 28–28, 28–28, 16–34
Pts: Chico Vaughn 27; Rebs: Trooper Washington 14	Pts: Red Robbins 30; Rebs: Red Robbins 22
New Orleans leads series, 2–1

Loyola Field House, New Orleans, Louisiana
Attendance: 6,310

Pittsburgh had ten-point leads at the end of each of the first three quarters, but New Orleans rallied late, with Jimmy Jones giving New Orleans the lead for good with a layup to make it 102-101 with 1:19 to go.

April 25

Boxscore

Pittsburgh Pipers 106, New Orleans Buccaneers 105 (OT)
Scoring by quarter: 25–28, 22–24, 36–30, 25–16, Overtime: 8–7
Pts: Connie Hawkins 47; Rebs: Trooper Washington 25	Pts: Jimmy Jones 23; Rebs: Red Robbins 10
Series tied, 2–2

Loyola Field House, New Orleans, Louisiana
Attendance: 7,000

New Orleans led for most of the game before Pittsburgh took advantage of foul trouble to rally late to tie the game with three minutes to go before taking a 98–95 lead with 1:15 to go. Larry Brown knocked a 25-foot three-pointer with time expiring to force overtime. Charlie Williams was fouled with one second remaining and made a free throw to provide the Pipers a 106–105 victory.

April 27

Boxscore

New Orleans Buccaneers 111, Pittsburgh Pipers 108
Scoring by quarter: 25–30, 29–28, 25–24, 32–26
Pts: Doug Moe 31; Rebs: Red Robbins 10	Pts: Charlie Williams 29; Rebs: Trooper Washington 17
New Orleans leads series, 3–2

Civic Arena, Pittsburgh, Pennsylvania
Attendance: 3,347

Due to a torn knee tendon, Connie Hawkins missed the game for the Pipers. Pittsburgh actually led for most of the first three quarters, but the Buccaneers rallied late on the strength of Larry Brown, who scored 13 points in the final eight minutes, which included a free-throw shot with 2:09 to go to give the team a 102-101 lead that they would hold for the rest of the way.

May 1

Boxscore

Pittsburgh Pipers 118, New Orleans Buccaneers 112
Scoring by quarter: 33–32, 26–40, 34–21, 25–19
Pts: Connie Hawkins 41; Rebs: Trooper Washington 16	Pts: Doug Moe 25; Rebs: Red Robbins 11
Series tied, 3–3

Loyola Field House, New Orleans, Louisiana
Attendance: 7,200

Nursing a knee injury he suffered in Game 4 that saw him taped up extensively, Connie Hawkins led the way in scoring with 41 points to help the team overcome a 72-59 halftime deficit to send the series to a decisive Game 7.

May 4

Boxscore

New Orleans Buccaneers 113, Pittsburgh Pipers 122
Scoring by quarter: 32–36, 23–31, 31–35, 27–20
Pts: Doug Moe 28; Rebs: Red Robbins 13	Pts: Charlie Williams 35; Rebs: Trooper Washington 14
Pittsburgh wins series, 4–3

Civic Arena, Pittsburgh, Pennsylvania
Attendance: 11,457

Pittsburgh led by 12 points by halftime and road the hot hand of Charlie Williams for 35 points. Doug Moe rallied the Buccaneers from being down 20 in the third quarter to get within five points three times in the final minute of the game. Moe committed his fifth personal foul and then a double technical that ended the rally as Pittsburgh cruised to a 122-113 victory. This is the only professional basketball championship for the city of Pittsburgh. It is also the closest the city of New Orleans came to a pro championship until Super Bowl XLIV.

Connie Hawkins and Larry Brown would later join the Naismith Basketball Hall of Fame.

In the summer, Minnesota-based lawyer Bill Erickson purchased a majority share of the team and moved the team to Minnesota (the team proceeded to move back to Pittsburgh the following year, albeit without Hawkins). A contract dispute involving money requested for the move between the team and head coach Vince Cazzetta led to his resignation. He never coached a basketball game ever again, but he enjoyed the experience of having coached the team to victory, with him often wearing a championship ring in his later years; 37 years to the day of the Game 7 victory, Cazzetta passed away.

The trophy won by the Pipers is held on display at the Heinz History Center; despite their historical impact on the ABA, however, the team is not even mentioned at the Naismith Memorial Basketball Hall of Fame.

Regular-season series
Tied 3–3 in the regular-season series

October 30, 1967

Report

New Orleans Buccaneers 128, Pittsburgh Pipers 99

Civic Arena, Pittsburgh

November 17, 1967

Report

New Orleans Buccaneers 94, Pittsburgh Pipers 95

Civic Arena, Pittsburgh

November 28, 1967

Report

Pittsburgh Pipers 99, New Orleans Buccaneers 106

Loyola Field House, New Orleans

January 19, 1968

Report

New Orleans Buccaneers 126, Pittsburgh Pipers 132

Civic Arena, Pittsburgh

February 17, 1968

Report

New Orleans Buccaneers 121, Pittsburgh Pipers 129

Civic Arena, Pittsburgh

March 8, 1968

Report

Pittsburgh Pipers 114, New Orleans Buccaneers 116

Loyola Field House, New Orleans

== Statistical leaders ==
Category	Total			Average			
Category	Player	Team	Total	Player	Team	Avg.	Games played
Points	Connie Hawkins	Pittsburgh Pipers	419	Connie Hawkins	Pittsburgh Pipers	29.9	14
Rebounds	Trooper Washington	Pittsburgh Pipers	261	Trooper Washington	Pittsburgh Pipers	17.4	15
Assists	Larry Brown	New Orleans Buccaneers	129	Larry Brown	New Orleans Buccaneers	7.6	17

=== Total leaders ===
Points

1. Connie Hawkins - 419
2. Doug Moe - 399
3. Jimmy Jones - 375
4. Charlie Williams - 356
5. Art Heyman - 296
6. Red Robbins - 296

Rebounds

1. Trooper Washington - 261
2. Red Robbins - 234
3. Connie Hawkins - 172
4. Doug Moe - 169
5. Mel Daniels - 161

Assists

1. Larry Brown - 129
2. Connie Hawkins - 64
3. Art Heyman - 58
4. Donnie Freeman - 56
5. Jimmy Jones - 56

Minutes

1. Jimmy Jones - 785
2. Doug Moe - 715
3. Larry Brown - 696
4. Charlie Williams - 626
5. Red Robbins - 621
