= ABA Coach of the Year Award =

The American Basketball Association's Coach of the Year was an annual National Basketball Association (ABA) award given from 1968 to 1976. It was awarded to nine people in total, with two instances of co-Coach of the Year Awards being given out. Larry Brown was the only coach to win it more than once, winning it three times. Only the first two winners of the award ended up winning the ABA Finals that same season.

Season	Coach	Team	Record	winning%	place in Division	place in the ABA	playoff finish
1967–68	Vince Cazzetta	Pittsburgh Pipers	54-24	.692	1st	1st	ABA Champions (4–3) over the Buccaneers
1968-69	Alex Hannum	Oakland Oaks	60-18	.769	1st	1st	ABA Champions (4–1) over the Pacers
1969–70 Tie	Bill Sharman	Los Angeles Stars	43-41	.512	4th	6th	Lost (4–2) in the Finals to Pacers
1969–70 Tie	Joe Belmont	Denver Rockets	42-14	.750	1st	2nd	Lost (4–1) in the Western Division Semifinals to the Stars
1970–71	Al Bianchi	Virginia Squires	55-29	.655	1st	3rd	Lost (4–2) in the Eastern Division Finals to the Colonels
1971–72	Tom Nissalke	Dallas Chaparrals	42-42	.500	3rd	6th	Lost (4–0) in the Western Division Semifinals to the Stars
1972–73	Larry Brown	Carolina Cougars	57-27	.679	1st	1st	Lost (4–3) in the Eastern Division Finals to the Colonels
1973–74 Tie	Babe McCarthy	Kentucky Colonels	53-31	.631	2nd	2nd	Lost (4–0) in the Eastern Division Finals to the Nets
1973–74 Tie	Joe Mullaney	Utah Stars	51-33	.607	1st	3rd	Lost (4–1) in the Finals to the Nets
1974–75	Larry Brown	Denver Nuggets	65-19	.774	1st	1st	Lost (4–3) in the Western Division Finals to Pacers
1975–76	Larry Brown	Denver Nuggets	60-24	.714	no divisions	1st	Lost (4–2) in the Finals to the Nets
