= Gus Young (basketball) =

American basketball coach (1910–1977)

Biographical details
- Born: February 20, 1910; Meeker, Colorado, U.S.
- Died: October 31, 1977 (aged 67); Edina, Minnesota, U.S.

Coaching career (HC unless noted)
- 1932–1934: Warroad HS (MN)
- 1934–1935: Buffalo (MN)
- 1935–1936: Hutchinson HS (MN)
- 1936–1939: Austin HS (MN)
- 1942–1943: Minnesota (assistant)
- 1949–1957: Gustavus Adolphus
- 1969: Minnesota Pipers

Head coaching record
- Overall: 127–97 (.567) (college); 10–23 (.303) (ABA)
- Tournaments: 5–3 (.625) (NAIA); 3–4 (.429) (ABA)

Accomplishments and honors

Championships
- 3x MIAA champion (1954, 1955, 1956)

Verl "Gus" Young (February 20, 1910 – October 31, 1977) was an American basketball coach who was the head coach at Gustavus Adolphus College from 1949 to 1957 and the Minnesota Pipers of the American Basketball Association in 1969.

== Biography ==
Young was born on February 20, 1910, in Meeker, Colorado. He graduated from Wadena High School in Wadena, Minnesota.

Young played basketball, football, and baseball at Carleton College in Northfield, Minnesota. He began his coaching career in 1932 at Warroad High School in Warroad, Minnesota. He then coached at Buffalo High School (1934–35), Hutchinson High School (1935–36), and Austin High School (1936–39). He also coached a Hormel Foods-sponsored basketball team while in Austin, Minnesota.

In 1939, Young returned to Carelton as an assistant football coach. He became an assistant basketball coach at the University of Minnesota in 1942, but left in January 1943 to join the United States Navy.

Young remained out of coaching until 1949, when he was named basketball coach at Gustavus Adolphus College. In eight seasons under Young, Gustavus Adolphus went 127–97 and won three Minnesota Intercollegiate Athletic Conference titles (1954, 1955, 1956). He was known for his promotional work, which included having his team perform complex warm-up drills with multi-colored basketballs and half-time variety shows that featured a tuxedo-suited pep band, a 100-man chorus, and spotlighted flag shows. He resigned in 1957, citing criticism from the student newspaper, "difference of opinion with certain staff members", and the unexpected death of Macalester College coach Dwight Stuessy as his reasons for leaving. He was inducted into the Gustavus Adolphus College Athletics Hall of Fame in 1978 and the school's basketball gymnasium was named in his honor.

Following his departure, Young purchased the Austin Bowl, a bowling alley in Austin, Minnesota. On January 6, 1959, he bowled a perfect game at his alley. In 1962, purchased the Biltmore Lanes in Edina, Minnesota and moved from Austin to Edina to manage the alley. In 1970, he acquired the Southdale Bowl, also in Edina.

Young returned to basketball in 1968 as the director of special promotions for the American Basketball Association's Minnesota Pipers, which had just relocated to the state from Pittsburgh. On January 30, 1969, Pipers coach Jim Harding was fired after getting into a fistfight with Pipers chairman Gabe Rubin and Young was chosen to replace him. The Pipers, which were 26–19 at the time of Harding's firing, went 10–23 under Young and were eliminated in the first round of the 1969 ABA playoffs by the Miami Floridians. The team returned to Pittsburgh for the following season and Young was replaced as head coach by John Clark Jr. of Saint Francis College.

Young died on October 31, 1977 at his home in Edina.
