= Jim Harding (basketball) =

American basketball coach (1924–2000)

Biographical details
- Born: February 24, 1924; Clinton, Iowa, U.S.
- Died: June 3, 2000 (aged 76)

Coaching career (HC unless noted)
- 1949–1950: West Liberty (IA)
- 1951–1953: Marmion Military (assistant)
- 1953–1956: Marquette University HS
- 1957–1958: Loyola (LA)
- 1963–1966: Gannon
- 1967–1968: La Salle
- 1968–1969: Minnesota Pipers
- 1969–1973: Detroit

Administrative career (AD unless noted)
- 1963–1966: Gannon
- 1975–1981: Milwaukee

Head coaching record
- Overall: 148–80 (.649) (College); 20–13 (.606) (ABA)
- Tournaments: 0–2 (.000) (NCAA)

James Francis Harding (February 24, 1924 – June 3, 2000) was an American basketball coach who was the head men's coach at Loyola University New Orleans (1957–1958), La Salle University (1967–1968), and the University of Detroit (1969–1973). He also spent part of one season (1968–1969) as the head coach of the Minnesota Pipers of the American Basketball Association.

== Early life ==
Harding was born on February 24, 1924, in Clinton, Iowa. He served in the United States Army during World War II. He played football and basketball at the University of Iowa.

== Coaching ==
Harding was the football, basketball, and track coach at West Liberty High School in West Liberty, Iowa during the 1949–50 school year. From 1951 to 1953, he was an assistant coach at the Marmion Military Academy in Aurora, Illinois. In 1953, he became the head basketball coach at Marquette University High School. He compiled an overall record of 56–9 and led the school to a state championship in 1954. He resigned in 1956 and spent a year out of coaching. He worked as an industrial public relations counselor for the Milwaukee School of Engineering.

In 1957, Harding was named head basketball coach at Loyola University in New Orleans. That season, the Wolfpack went 16–9 and appeared in the NCAA University Division basketball tournament. However, according to sportswriter Jack Fiser, Harding "managed to alienate just about everybody that crossed his path in one short year". Prior to Loyola's tournament game, Harding announced his interest in the head coaching job at Marquette University. On March 7, 1958, Harding announced his resignation after he was hanged in effigy from the roof of the administration building.

Harding returned to the sidelines in 1963 as the head coach and athletic director at Gannon College. He compiled a 57–12 record over three seasons. His 1964–65 team finished the season with the #6 ranking among small college teams. His team was invited to the NAIA men's basketball tournament, but school's athletic board would not allow it. He left in 1966 and returned to Milwaukee to work as a business executive.

In 1967, Harding was named head coach of the La Salle Explorers men's basketball team. His team, which contained future NBA players Larry Cannon, Bernie Williams, and Fatty Taylor, as well as Lefty Ervin, Ed Szczesny, and Stan Wlodarczyk, went 20–8 and appeared in the 1968 NCAA University Division basketball tournament.

On August 5, 1968, Harding was named head coach of the Minnesota Pipers of the American Basketball Association. The Pipers had played in Pittsburgh during the 1967–68 ABA season and were the defending ABA champions. He succeeded Vince Cazzetta, who left the team due to a salary dispute. At the All-Star break, the Pipers were 20–13 and in first place in the Eastern Conference. Harding was scheduled to coach the East team at the 1969 ABA All-Star Game, but was removed by ABA management after getting into a fistfight with Pipers chairman Gabe Rubin. Harding was fired on January 30, 1969, and replaced by Gus Young, the team's director of special promotions and a former basketball coach at Gustavus Adolphus College.

On April 22, 1969, Harding was named head basketball coach at the University of Detroit. He was hired after Don Haskins accepted the job, then resigned after three days to return to the University of Texas at El Paso. During his first season, players staged a walkout to protest practices they felt were long. The following year, the team boycotted practices after Harding suspended two players. After players publicly accused Harding of deceptive recruiting, physical and verbal abuse, and lack of regard for injured players, he suspended the entire team. He resigned in 1973, stating that he had "once again established the program on a national prestige level". Over four seasons, he compiled a 55–45 record.

In 1975, Harding was named athletic director at the University of Wisconsin–Milwaukee. He resigned in 1981 after the school chose to drop from NCAA Division I to the non-scholarship level.

== Head coaching record ==
=== ABA ===
Team	Year	G	W	L	W–L%	Finish	PG	PW	PL	PW–L%	Result
Minnesota	1968–69	33	20	13	.606	Left mid-season	—	—	—	—	
Career		33	20	13	.606		—	—	—	—	

== Death ==
Harding moved to New Port Richey, Florida in 1989. He died there on June 3, 2000.
