= John Clark (basketball coach) =

American basketball coach (born 1937)

Biographical details
- Born: August 26, 1937 (age 89); Harrisburg, Pennsylvania, U.S.

Coaching career (HC unless noted)
- 1959–1964: Bishop Egan HS
- 1964–1966: Saint Francis (assistant)
- 1966–1969: Saint Francis
- 1969–1970: Pittsburgh Pipers

Head coaching record
- Overall: 55–20 (.733) (college); 14–25 (.359) (ABA)

John M. Clark Jr. (born August 26, 1937) is an American former basketball coach who was the head coach at Saint Francis College in Loretto, Pennsylvania from 1966 to 1969 and the Pittsburgh Pipers of the American Basketball Association from 1969 to 1970.

== Biography ==
Clark played college basketball at the College of Steubenville in Steubenville, Ohio and was the team's most valuable player in 1959. From 1959 to 1964, he compiled a 75–39 record as head coach at Bishop Egan High School in Levittown, Pennsylvania. He then spent two seasons as an assistant to Skip Hughes at Saint Francis College, during which time he led the freshman team to a 26–5 record. He was promoted to head coach following Hughes' retirement in 1966. He amassed a 55–20 over three seasons and developed future National Basketball Association players Norm Van Lier and Kevin Porter.

In 1969, Clark was named head coach of the American Basketball Association's Pittsburgh Pipers, which returned to the city after a year in Minnesota. He was the team's fifth coach in its three-season existence. Clark's tenure was also short-lived, as he was replaced by Buddy Jeannette after a 14–25 start.

Clark left coaching after his lone ABA season. He was an executive with the Converse Shoe Company.

== Head coaching record ==
=== ABA ===
Team	Year	G	W	L	W–L%	Finish	PG	PW	PL	PW–L%	Result
Pittsburgh	1969–70	39	14	25	.359	Left mid-season	—	—	—	—	
Career		39	14	25	.359		–	–	–	–	
