= Minnesota Muskies =

- Division: Eastern Division
- Founded: 1967
- History: Minnesota Muskies 1967–1968; Miami Floridians/The Floridians 1968–1972
- Arena: Metropolitan Sports Center
- Location: Bloomington, Minnesota
- Team colors: Blue and Gold
- Team manager: Dennis Murphy
- Head coach: Jim Pollard
- Ownership: L.P. Shields & Fred Jefferson 1968–1969; Ned Doyle 1970

The Minnesota Muskies were a member of the American Basketball Association (ABA), born with the league's creation on February 2, 1967. L.P. Shields and Fred Jefferson were the owners after paying a franchise fee of $30,000. The team then played one season in Minnesota before moving to Miami, Florida to become The Floridians. The team colors were blue and gold and games were played at the Metropolitan Sports Center in Bloomington, Minnesota, which they shared with the Minnesota North Stars.

== History ==
The ABA first located its league office in Minneapolis and the future looked bright for the Muskies (named after the Muskellunge, also known as the muskie; Minnesota is one of the regions the fish is found in), who shared the same offices as the league itself. Their first draft pick was talented center Mel Daniels, who would go on to become one of the ABA's most celebrated players. Daniels was also a first round draft pick of the Cincinnati Royals of the National Basketball Association (NBA), but he decided to cast his lot with the upstart league. The selection of Daniels paid off for the team as he led the league in field goal attempts, field goals made, offensive and defensive rebounds, and was named the league's Rookie of the Year. Daniels, Donnie Freeman, and Les Hunter all represented the Muskies in the first ABA All-Star Game. Shooting guard Ron Perry finished fifth in the league in three-point field goals made and attempted and fourth in three-point field goal percentage. The head coach was Jim Pollard, a former teammate of ABA Commissioner George Mikan from their days with the NBA's Minneapolis Lakers. The Muskies would win 50 games in their lone season under that franchise name.

Early in the league's first season, the Muskies and the Indiana Pacers dueled for first place in the Eastern Division. Although the Muskies pulled away from the Pacers, the Pittsburgh Pipers rallied to eventually win the Eastern Division title by four games. The Muskies would finish the season with a record of 50 wins and 28 losses.

In the Eastern Division playoff semifinals, the Muskies split the first four of five games with the Kentucky Colonels and then won the decisive Game Five, 114–108, at home. The Muskies then met the Pipers for the Eastern Division Championship and lost 4 games to 1 to the eventual champion.

=== 1967–68 ABA season ===
Eastern Division Standings
Team	W	L	PCT.	GB
Pittsburgh Pipers	54	24	.692	–
Minnesota Muskies	50	28	.641	4
Indiana Pacers	38	40	.487	16
Kentucky Colonels	36	42	.462	18
New Jersey Americans	36	42	.462	18

For their success on the court, the Muskies were a complete bust off the court. They lost an estimated $400,000 in their first and only season. They only averaged 2,800 people per game, but it might have been far less, given that they only sold 100 season tickets at the time. The Muskies' management sought to make changes for the upcoming 1968–69 season with the team planning to play nine of their home games at other locations in Minnesota and signed a favorable television contract. In spite of this, the owners decided to relocate the franchise to Miami, Florida on May 24, 1968, for the 1968–69 ABA season. Prior to the start of the season, the team was forced to sell off Daniels to the Pacers in a trade for cash in order to pay off accumulated debts from the previous season.

However, Minnesota was not left without an ABA team for long, as the league champion Pipers ironically relocated to Minneapolis to play as the Minnesota Pipers for the 1968–69 ABA season. The franchise would move back to Pittsburgh after their own sole season in Minnesota, with the league not bothering to return to Minnesota again following George Mikan's resignation as commissioner and the subsequent move of the ABA's headquarters to New York (which would also be home to the New York Nets for the rest of the ABA's tenure).

The Minnesota Timberwolves wore Muskies uniforms for six games during the 2011–12 NBA season as part of the NBA's "Hardwood Classics".

== Basketball Hall of Famers ==
Minnesota Muskies Hall of Famers
Players
No.	Name	Position	Tenure	Inducted
34	Mel Daniels	C	1967–1968	2012
Coaches
Name		Position	Tenure	Inducted
Jim Pollard ^{1}		Head coach	1967–1968	1978

Notes:

- ^{1} Inducted as a player.
