= Connie Hawkins =

American basketball player (1942–2017)

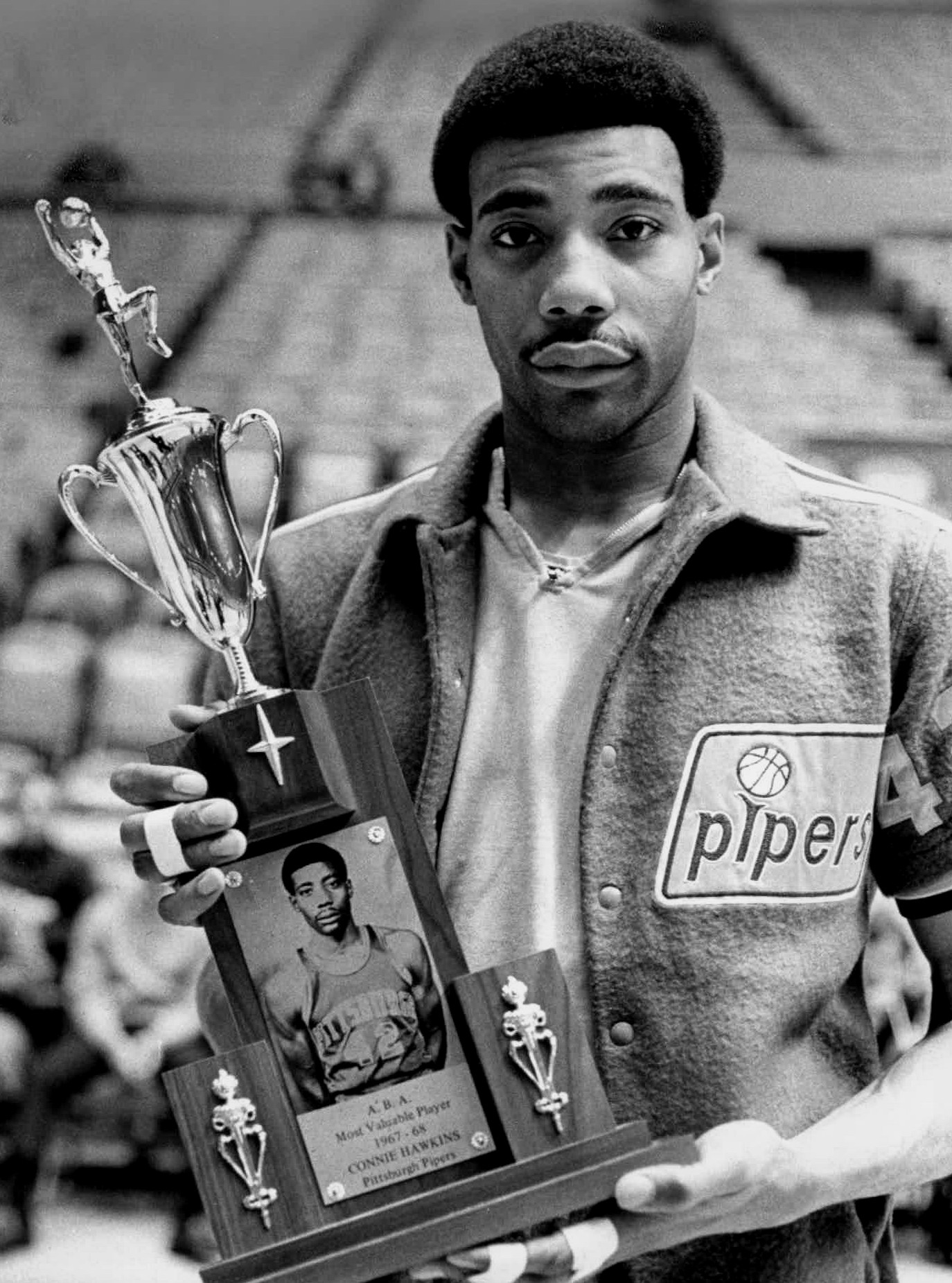
- Hawkins with the ABA's most valuable player award in 1968

Personal information
- Born: July 17, 1942 Brooklyn, New York, U.S.
- Died: October 6, 2017 (aged 75) Phoenix, Arizona, U.S.
- Listed height: 6 ft 8 in (2.03 m)
- Listed weight: 210 lb (95 kg)

Career information
- High school: Boys (Brooklyn, New York)
- NBA draft: 1964: undrafted
- Playing career: 1961–1976
- Position: Power forward / center
- Number: 42

Career history
- 1961–1962: Pittsburgh Rens
- 1963–1967: Harlem Globetrotters
- 1967–1969: Pittsburgh/Minnesota Pipers
- 1969–1973: Phoenix Suns
- 1973–1975: Los Angeles Lakers
- 1975–1976: Atlanta Hawks

Career highlights
- ABA champion (1968); ABA Playoffs MVP (1968); ABA Most Valuable Player (1968); 4× NBA All-Star (1970–1973); 2× ABA All-Star (1968, 1969); All-NBA First Team (1970); 2× All-ABA First Team (1968, 1969); ABA All-Time Team; No. 42 retired by Phoenix Suns; ABL MVP (1962); All-ABL First Team (1962); Mr. Basketball USA (1960); First-team Parade All-American (1960)

Career ABA and NBA statistics
- Points: 11,528 (18.7 ppg)
- Rebounds: 5,450 (8.8 rpg)
- Assists: 2,556 (4.1 apg)
- Stats at NBA.com
- Stats at Basketball Reference
- Basketball Hall of Fame

Cornelius Lance "Connie" Hawkins (July 17, 1942 – October 6, 2017) was an American professional basketball player. Hawkins was a legendary high school basketball player in New York City at Boys High School in Brooklyn and at Rucker Park. As the result of unjust actions taken against him as a teenager, Hawkins never played college basketball and only entered the National Basketball Association (NBA) when he was 27 years old, after years of litigation against the NBA. He had a winding and varied professional playing career in three different leagues and with the Harlem Globetrotters, during which Hawkins excelled at every level; and he was inducted into the Naismith Basketball Hall of Fame in 1992.

Nicknamed "the Hawk", his career initially suffered due to his false implication in a point-shaving scandal that saw him expelled from the Iowa Hawkeyes men's basketball team as a freshman and blackballed by the NBA. Hawkins found refuge with the Pittsburgh Rens of the American Basketball League (ABL), where he was selected the 1961–62 league Most Valuable Player (MVP). The ABL folded in the middle of the following season, and Hawkins then played four years for the famed exhibition team the Harlem Globetrotters before getting to play in the American Basketball Association (ABA) with the Pittsburgh Pipers in 1967. He won the ABA's first MVP award by averaging 26.8 points per game and led the team to the ABA championship.

While still with the Globetrotters in 1966, an antitrust lawsuit was filed on Hawkins' behalf against the National Basketball Association (NBA) on the basis that all of its teams joined together in prohibiting him from playing professionally in the NBA. After a stellar second ABA season (1968–69) with the Minnesota Pipers (when he was named an All-Star for the second time and was second in the league's MVP voting), the lawsuit proved successful in both stirring public opinion in Hawkins' favor and in causing the NBA to fear it would lose the suit to its much wider disadvantage. Hawkins and the NBA reached a settlement agreement under which Hawkins was allowed to play in the NBA, and received a cash payment from the NBA.

Hawkins was 27 years old by the time he finally reached the NBA as a rookie with the Phoenix Suns in the 1969–70 season. He had knee surgery in the preceding season before joining the NBA, but averaged 24.6 points and 10.4 rebounds per game for the Suns, and led the Suns to their first NBA playoffs as a franchise, almost upsetting the Los Angeles Lakers (led by Wilt Chamberlain, Jerry West, and Elgin Baylor) in the first round of the 1970 NBA playoffs. In his first NBA season, Hawkins was named first-team All-NBA, was selected as a starter in the 1970 NBA All-Star Game, and was fifth in the NBA's MVP voting.

Hawkins would play seven seasons in the NBA for the Suns, Los Angeles Lakers, and Atlanta Hawks before his career ended at the age of 34. He was named an NBA All-Star in his first four seasons with the Suns. In eleven seasons of professional basketball in the ABL, ABA, and NBA, Hawkins was an All-Star six times (four NBA, two ABA) while being named a first-team all-league player in each of the three leagues he played in.

== Early years ==
Hawkins was born on July 17, 1942, in the Bedford-Stuyvesant section of Brooklyn. He was one of six children, whose father left the family when he was 10; supported by a mother who worked as a cook while suffering from glaucoma. He attended Boys High School, and played for coach Mickey Fisher. Hawkins soon became a fixture at Rucker Park, a legendary outdoor court where he battled against some of the best players in the world, such as Wilt Chamberlain. He is often described as a “New York playground legend”, and became known as "the Hawk".

Hawkins did not play much until his junior year at Boys High. Hawkins was All-City first team as a junior as Boys went undefeated and won New York's Public Schools Athletic League (PSAL) title in 1959. During his senior year he averaged 25.5 points per game, including one game in which he scored 60, and Boys again went undefeated and won the 1960 PSAL title.

In 1960, he was named a Parade magazine high school All-American. In 2003, the 1959 and 1960 Boys High basketball teams were inducted into the New York City Basketball Hall of Fame.

== College and investigation into point-shaving ==
Hawkins was recruited by 250 colleges, before accepting a scholarship to play at the University of Iowa. During Hawkins' freshman year at Iowa, he was a victim of the hysteria surrounding a point-shaving scandal that had started in New York City. Hawkins’ name surfaced in an interview conducted with an individual who was involved in the scandal. While some of the conspirators and characters involved were known to or knew Hawkins, none – including the New York attorney at the center of the scandal, Jack Molinas – had ever sought to involve Hawkins in the conspiracy. Hawkins had borrowed $200 ($2,200 in current dollar terms) from Molinas for school expenses, which his brother Fred repaid before the scandal broke in 1961. The scandal became known as the 1961 college basketball gambling scandal.

Hawkins could not have been involved in point-shaving himself since due to NCAA rules at the time, as a freshman he was ineligible to participate in varsity-level athletics. He was accused of introducing the gamblers to other players to fix games, which he denied. Hawkins, then a teenager, was kept from seeking legal counsel while being questioned in a Manhattan hotel over a period of two weeks by New York City detectives who were investigating the scandal. Hawkins later said that he told the police he had tried to help get some black players involved in a proposed summer league; not that he was bringing in college athletes to fix game. "'I kept telling them the truth over and over again but they wanted to hear other things . . . So I told them anything they wanted to hear just to get out of there'". This "confession" was later deemed worthless by some investigators because of its many contradictions. Later in 1961, in connection with the Pittsburgh Rens investigating Hawkins before signing him to a professional contract, it was reported that Hawkins had been cleared of any wrongdoing by the New York District Attorney's office.

=== Expulsion from Iowa ===
As a result of the investigation, during which Hawkins maintained that he had no involvement in the scheme, and despite never being arrested or indicted, Hawkins was effectively expelled from Iowa. After coming back to Iowa from New York, his coach told him it was best if Hawkins not return; and despite his protests of innocence to the school administrators and the NCAA, Iowa took away his scholarship. Hawkins was blackballed from the college ranks as no NCAA or NAIA school would offer him a scholarship.

After being expelled from Iowa, Hawkins came home to Brooklyn. He lived with his mother and five siblings in economically difficult circumstances. He tried to rebuild his life and began playing basketball again on New York City playground courts; but once the other players found out who he was they refused to play with him because of the scandal, and he had to play in more remote playgrounds in New Jersey and Long Island. Hawkins' mother was a religious person and kept him "fortified with her prayers" and hopeful outlook, when he was despairing.

Hawkins decided to come back to New York City to try and play in the Rucker Tournament; that included some NBA players as participants. Initially no one would get on the court with Hawkins until Wilt Chamberlain said he would play with Hawkins. Hawkins said years later "'That broke the stigma and everyone followed suit. Wilt was the most dominant player in the game and believed me. He told me if I was innocent it would be all right'". He also received support from other NBA players, such as Sam Jones and Willis Reed.

== Professional career ==
=== Pittsburgh Rens (1961–1962) ===
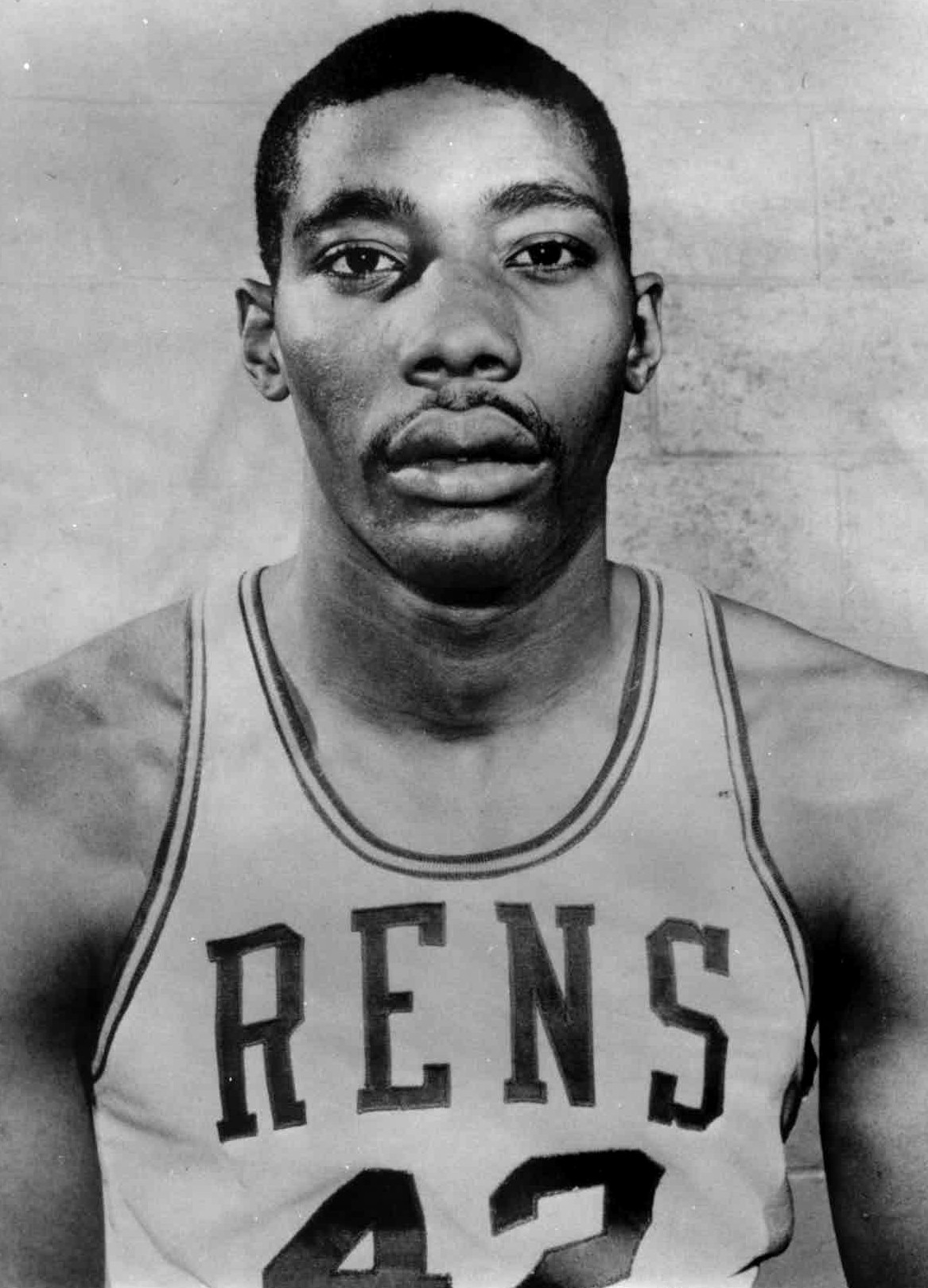
Hawkins in 1962

With college basketball and the NBA having blackballed him, the 19-year old Hawkins signed an undrafted deal with the Pittsburgh Rens of the American Basketball League (ABL), an aspiring rival to the NBA founded by Abe Saperstein. Under the usual ABL rules, Hawkins would not have been eligible to play until his college class was eligible; however, the league made an exception on the basis of economic hardship. The Rens were owned by Lenny Litman. After signing Hawkins, Litman said he had discussed Hawkins with the New York District Attorney's office, among others, before signing Hawkins. It was reported at the time that the District Attorney's office assured Litman that it had given Hawkins "a clean bill of health after being questioned in the basketball scandals". Hawkins played with the Rens for only one full season and one partial season before the league unceremoniously shut down on New Year's Eve in 1962.

On January 15, 1962, to kick off the second half of the ABL's inaugural season, Hawkins scored a league-record 54 points in a 110-108 loss to the Cleveland Pipers. By the end of the season, he would be both named a member of the All-ABL First Team and become the league's Most Valuable Player (MVP), putting up averages of 27.5 points (the league's leader that season), 13.3 rebounds, and 2.3 assists per game in 78 total games played for the Rens. He led the ABL in total points (2,145) and was second to Bill Bridges in total rebounds (1,038 to 1,059).

After finishing with a 41–40 overall record, which was good enough for a second place finish in the Eastern Division and to subsequently qualify for the only ABL Playoffs done in the second half of the season (the ABL used a first half playoff system and a second half playoff system during their only full season of play), Hawkins would put up a team-high 41 points and 17 rebounds alongside four assists in all 53 minutes of play in a 107–103 overtime loss to the San Francisco Saints, which turned out to be his only playoff game played in the ABL. His second season would have him dealing with some injury problems, but before that season prematurely ended, he would still average 27.9 points (second behind Bill Bridges), 12.8 rebounds, and 2.6 assists in only 16 games played for the Rens (out of 22 overall that were completed for a 12–10 record) that year.

=== Harlem Globetrotters (1963–1967) ===
After the ABL folded in the middle of the 1962–63 season, Hawkins joined the Harlem Globetrotters, a team owned and operated by Abe Saperstein, former head of the ABL. Hawkins spent four years with the Globetrotters. He learned how to control the basketball while barnstorming across the world with the Globetrotters, influencing his later playing style.

=== Lawsuit against the NBA ===
Maurice Podoloff was the NBA commissioner at the time of the 1961 betting scandal. Author David Wolf reported that Podoloff made clear that no one allegedly involved in the scandal would be allowed to play in the NBA, and the NBA's actions made clear there was a lack of interest in signing Hawkins when he was in talks about joining the ABL. J. Walter Kennedy replaced Podoloff as NBA commissioner at the end of April 1963. Starting in November 1963, Hawkins' lawyer David Litman (the brother of Rens' owner Lenny Litman) began writing to Kennedy of Hawkins' interest in joining the NBA.

When Hawkins' college class was eligible for the draft in 1964, no team selected him. No NBA teams drafted Hawkins in 1965 either; and Wolf reported that in 1965 Kennedy refused requests by the St. Louis Hawks, New York Knicks, and Los Angeles Lakers to be allowed to negotiate with Hawkins. Hawkins was formally banned from the NBA in 1966. After the case settled in June 1969, Kennedy said it had "'always been the policy of the NBA to make every effort, consistent with fairness to the player involved, to keep itself free of any contact or even suspicion of contact, with anyone who has ever been associated with gambling or fixing'".

Hawkins' lawyers David and Roslyn Litman (a law professor at the University of Pittsburgh) met with Kennedy in May 1966, and concluded that the NBA was not interested in determining the truth of what happened with Hawkins and Molinas in 1961; and that it was necessary to bring a legal action in court. In November 1966, they filed a $6 million antitrust lawsuit against the NBA and Kennedy on Hawkins' behalf. They asserted that the NBA and each of its individual teams blacklisted Hawkins, and that there was no substantial evidence linking him to gambling activities. Hawkins was still with the Globetrotters at that point, and the Litmans suggested that he leave the Globetrotters and join the new American Basketball Association (ABA) as a way to establish that his talent level was adequate to participate in the NBA; as well as an immediate source of income.

The Litmans took on Hawkins' case pro bono, believing in Hawkins' innocence. By the time the case settled in 1969, the Litmans and attorney Howard Specter had incurred $36,000 in expenses and put in a total of 10,000 hours of legal time on the case; and did ultimately receive a percentage of the settlement. The Litmans' son Harry later said Hawkins became an important member of their family.

Before playing in the ABA Hawkins played semi-professionally in a local industrial league called the Young Men's and Women's Hebrew Association, for a team called the Porky Chedwicks up until the summer of 1967. At that time, Hawkins was facing financial troubles from looking after his wife's brother, who was mentally challenged; as well as his own family and blind mother.

=== Pittsburgh/Minnesota Pipers (1967–1969) ===
Hawkins joined the Pittsburgh Pipers in the inaugural 1967–68 season of the ABA, leading the team to a 54–24 regular season record and the 1968 ABA championship. Hawkins' creativity and high level skills as a ballhandler and passer, in addition to his formidable talents as a "big man" (dunking, rebounding, and shot blocking), were unique at that time for a 6 ft 8 in (2.03 m) player. He also was noted for his leaping ability, and his awareness of what his teammates were doing on the court. His court awareness gave him the ability to take command of games "because he could see and analyze the entire court and every player on it all at once"; one sportswriter describing Hawkins as "'playing a very fast game of chess'".

In 70 games that season, his first in a professional basketball league since the end of 1962, Hawkins averaged 44.9 minutes, 26.8 points, 13.5 rebounds, and 4.6 assists per game. Hawkins led the ABA in scoring average that year and won both the ABA's regular season and playoff MVP awards. He also led the ABA in minutes per game, free throw attempts and free throws made, and was second in rebounds per game.

The Pipers played against the New Orleans Buccaneers in the ABA finals that year, whose roster included point guard Larry Brown (who had played against Hawkins on Brooklyn's public courts) and backup forward Doug Moe, who would both go on to long coaching careers, and Brown to the Hall of Fame. Hawkins averaged 30.2 points per game and 11.2 rebounds in winning that seven game series. In the first round of the 1968 ABA playoffs, Hawkins had averaged 29.3 points, 14.7 rebounds, and six assists per game; and in the ABA Eastern Division finals had averaged 29.4 points and 12.2 rebounds per game.

The Pipers moved to Minnesota for the 1968–69 season, but injuries and a knee surgery limited Hawkins to 47 games. Hawkins still averaged 39.4 minutes, 30.2 points, 11.4 rebounds, and 3.9 assists per game. He was selected to the East All-Star team (but could not play because of his knee injury); and was second in MVP voting to Mel Daniels that season. The Pipers made the playoffs despite injuries to their top four players during the season, but were eliminated in the first round of the playoffs in seven games. Hawkins played in all seven games and averaged 24.9 points and 12.3 rebounds per game. Following the playoffs, the Pipers franchise moved back to Pittsburgh.

In his two years in the ABA, Hawkins averaged 42.7 minutes, 28.2 points, 12.6 rebounds, and 4.3 assists per game.

=== Settlement with NBA ===
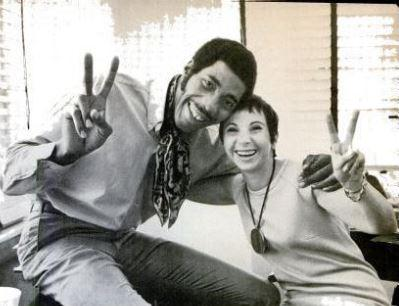
Hawkins in 1969, with his attorney, Roz Litman, celebrating the settlement of his antitrust case against the NBA

In the light of the lawsuit, and a 1969 Life magazine investigative article written by David Wolf that uncovered and adduced facts establishing the dubious nature of the evidence connecting Hawkins to gambling, the NBA concluded it was unlikely to successfully defend against Hawkins' claims. At a later time, one NBA general manager told Wolf "'It was damn clear we were going to lose if we went to court'". Seeking to avoid a defeat in court which might jeopardize its ability to bar players who had actually participated in gambling, the NBA elected to settle after the 1968–69 season and admit Hawkins to the league.

The league paid Hawkins a cash settlement of nearly $1.3 million (approximately $11,400,000 in 2025) in 1969, and assigned his rights to the expansion Phoenix Suns (who had won a league sponsored coin toss over the Seattle SuperSonics). He also received other financial benefits from the NBA under the settlement terms. Although the Pipers made a cursory effort to re-sign him, playing in the NBA had been a longtime ambition for Hawkins and he quickly signed with the Suns. After the 1970 season, the then Pittsburgh Condors unsuccessfully attempted to woo Hawkins back to Pittsburgh.

Wolf reported that the depositions of Kennedy and other NBA officials indicated there was never an adequate investigation by the NBA into the allegations against Hawkins. At one point, Kennedy reportedly said he was satisfied the NBA had conducted an adequate investigation via the Pinkerton Agency, and had given Hawkins a hearing before banning him. After the settlement, Kennedy provided a statement that allowing Hawkins to play in the NBA was consistent with the league policy to only keep out players who had any contact or even the suspicion of any contact with gambling or fixing games.

Kennedy said, in part, "'Shortly after I became commissioner I attempted to look into the serious charge against Hawkins. . . in connection with a college basketball scandal. Because I had no way of compelling answers to questions to those who might know the facts I was unable to complete that investigation. However, the lawsuit that just terminated did afford us an opportunity . . . to learn what facts were really available . . . NBA counsel now has advised me on the basis of evidence so developed, that the employment of Hawkins as a player by an NBA team will not be inconsistent" with the policy of keeping the NBA "'free of any contact or even suspicion of contact, with anyone who has ever been associated with gambling or fixing'".

=== Phoenix Suns (1969–1973) ===
In 1969, still recovering from knee surgery in his final ABA season, Hawkins hit the ground running with the Phoenix Suns, when he played 81 games and averaged 24.6 points, 10.4 rebounds and 4.8 assists per game. In the final game of his rookie season against Elvin Hayes and the San Diego Rockets, Hawkins had 44 points, 20 rebounds, 8 assists, 5 blocks and 5 steals. In his first NBA season, Hawkins was named first-team All-NBA. He was selected as a Western Division starter in the 1970 NBA All-Star Game. Hawkins tied for fifth in Most Valuable Player voting that year.

The Suns finished third in the Western Conference that season. In the 1970 NBA playoffs they were knocked out by the Los Angeles Lakers in a seven-game Western Division Semifinals series in which Hawkins carried the Suns against a team that had future Hall of Famers Wilt Chamberlain, Elgin Baylor and Jerry West. In Game 2 of the series, on March 29, 1970, Hawkins led the Suns to a 114–101 victory while scoring 34 points, grabbing 20 rebounds, and recording 7 assists. For the series, Hawkins averaged 25.4 points per game, 13.9 rebounds, 5.9 assists, and 46.9 minutes per game (despite his knee problems).

Hawkins missed 11 games during the 1970–71 season, after suffering a sprained ankle on December 26, 1970 in a game against the Portland Trail Blazers. In 71 games that season, he averaged 37.5 minutes, 20.9 points, 9.1 rebounds, and 4.5 assists per game. Hawkins was again selected to start in the All-Star Game, but was still suffering from the ankle sprain at the time the game was played on January 12. West team head coach Larry Costello started Hawkins to begin the All-Star Game, and replaced Hawkins after five seconds with Bob Love.

Hawkins played in 76 games in the 1971–72 season. He averaged 36.8 minutes, 21 points, 8.3 rebounds, and 3.9 assists per game. He led the team in scoring average and was second in rebounds per game. Hawkins was named an All-Star for the third consecutive season. On January 21, 1972, he scored a season-high 40 points during a win over the New York Knicks. During the 1972–73 Suns season, Hawkins played in 75 games, averaging 36.9 minutes, 16.1 points, 8.5 rebounds, and 4.1 assists per game.

Hawkins played for the Suns in eight games to begin the 1973–74 season. He averaged only 27.9 minutes, 11.3 points, and 5.4 rebounds over those eight games. He began the season as a starter alongside forward Corky Calhoun. By his seventh game, Hawkins played only 16 minutes as a starter, alongside the Suns' 1973 No. 1 draft choice Mike Bantom at the other forward position. Hawkins played four minutes in his last game with the Suns, with Bantom and reserve forward Lamar Green as starters in that game. Hawkins was traded from the Suns to the Los Angeles Lakers for small forward Keith Erickson and a 1974 second-round selection (31st overall–Fred Saunders) on October 30. Erickson had been a holdout with the Lakers before the trade. The suns used a forward rotation of Erickson (30.8 minutes per game), Calhoun (28.7 minutes per game), and Bantom (26.1 minutes per game) for the remainder of the season.

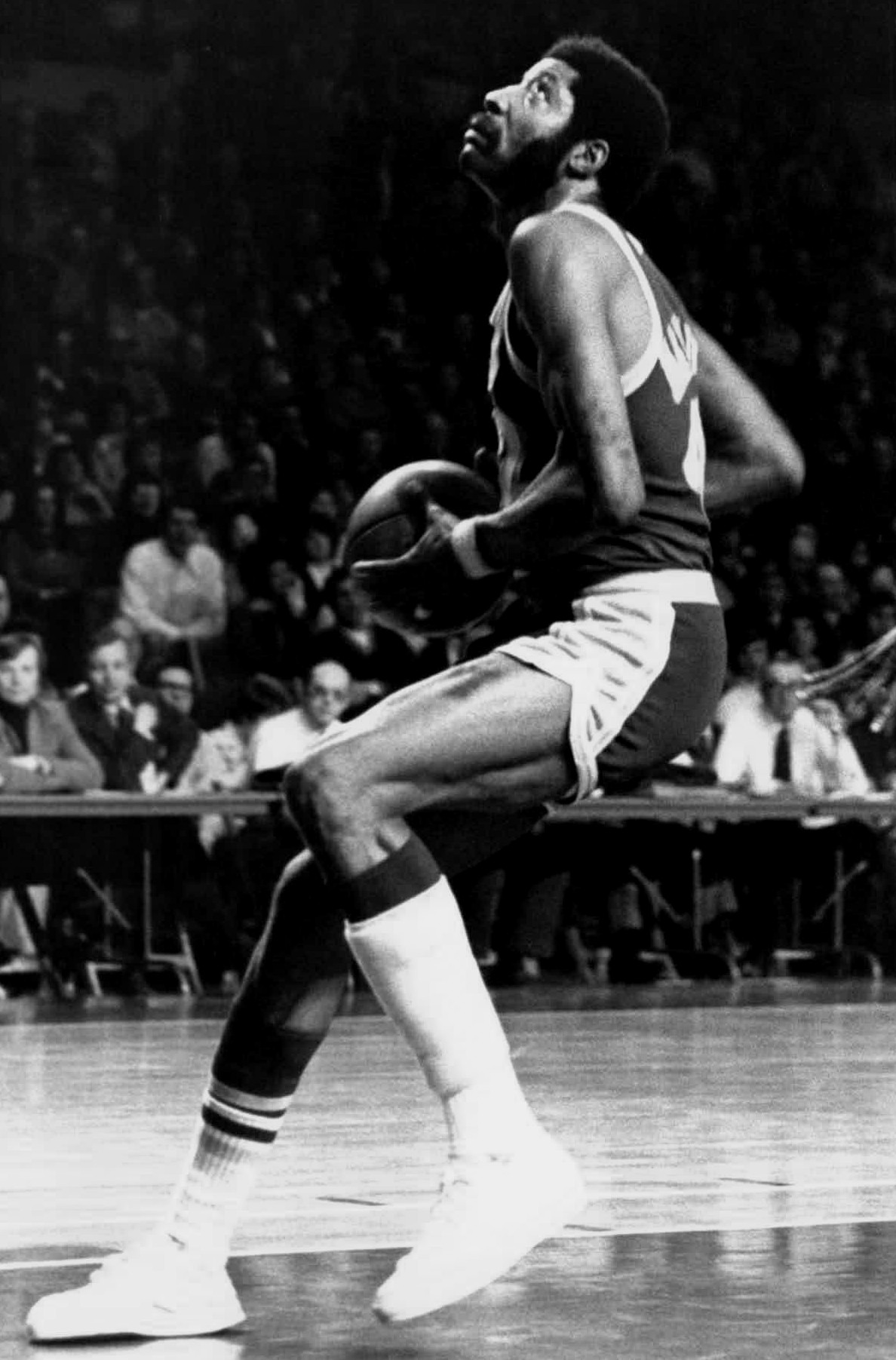
Hawkins as a member of the Los Angeles Lakers

=== Los Angeles Lakers (1973–1975) ===
Hawkins became the Lakers' starting small forward for the remainder of the 1973–74 season. He played in 71 games for the Lakers, averaging 35.7 minutes, 12.8 points, 7.4 rebounds, and 5.3 assists per game. Hawkins played in only 43 games for the Lakers during the 1974–75 season. He suffered a broken finger on his right hand in January 1975. Hawkins averaged 23.9 minutes, eight points, 4.6 rebounds, and 2.8 assists per game that season.

=== Atlanta Hawks (1975–1976) ===
The Lakers traded Hawkins to the Atlanta Hawks in early August 1975 for a future draft choice. In his last NBA season, Hawkins played in 74 games for the Hawks, averaging 25.8 minutes, 8.2 rebounds, six assists, and 2.9 assists per game.

Connie Hawkins entered the NBA at 27-years old. During a seven-year NBA career he averaged 34.5 minutes, 16.5 points, eight rebounds, and 4.1 assists per game.

In August 1977, Hawkins signed a contract to play for the Alco team in Bologna, Italy, under coach John McMillen; but only played in a few games for that team.

== Legacy and honors ==
Despite being unable to play in the NBA when he was in his prime, Hawkins' performances throughout the ABL, ABA and NBA helped get him inducted into the Naismith Memorial Basketball Hall of Fame in 1992. He was the first Sun inducted into the Hall of Fame. In 1997, Connie Hawkins was named to the ABA's All-Time Team. He was an original member of the Suns Ring of Honor, and his No. 42 jersey was retired by the Suns.

Hall of Fame head coach Larry Brown, who played in the ABA and coached in the ABA and NBA, was Hawkins' contemporary from Brooklyn. Brown both witnessed Hawkins play, and played against him during Hawkins' teen and ABA years. Brown said of Hawkins that "'He was Julius [Erving] before Julius, he was Elgin [Baylor] before Elgin, he was Michael [Jordan] before Michael. .... He was simply the greatest individual player I have ever seen'". Hawkins said Elgin Baylor was his role model. ABA player, and ABA and NBA coach, Doug Moe said of Hawkins, "'He was the first guy on that Dr. J-Michael Jordan level.... Nobody could match him'".

Hall of Fame NBA and ABA forward Rick Barry said "'The first time I saw Connie Hawkins . . . I couldn't believe what he could do with the basketball'". Hall of Fame center Kareem Abdul-Jabbar, who played 20 years in the NBA, included Hawkins among the top 15 players he ever played with or against. In June of 1969 when Hawkins was allowed into the NBA, Abdul-Jabbar said "'I've seen the best in the NBA but I've never seen anyone better than Hawkins. I've seen him play against NBA players in pickup games and embarrass them'".

The Connie Hawkins Summer Basketball League was established in Pittsburgh and lasted over three decades.

== Career statistics ==
Legend
GP	Games played	GS	Games started	MPG	Minutes per game
FG%	Field goal percentage	3P%	3-point field goal percentage	FT%	Free throw percentage
RPG	Rebounds per game	APG	Assists per game	SPG	Steals per game
BPG	Blocks per game	PPG	Points per game	**Bold**	Career high

**Bold**	Denotes career highs

=== Regular season ===
Legend
GP	Games played	GS	Games started	MPG	Minutes per game
FG%	Field goal percentage	3P%	3-point field goal percentage	FT%	Free throw percentage
RPG	Rebounds per game	APG	Assists per game	SPG	Steals per game
BPG	Blocks per game	PPG	Points per game	**Bold**	Career high
†	Won an NBA championship	*	Led the league

†	Denotes seasons in which Hawkins' team won an ABA championship

Year	Team	GP	GS	MPG	FG%	3P%	FT%	RPG	APG	SPG	BPG	PPG
1961–62	Pittsburgh (ABL)	78	–	42.9	.509	.167	.790	13.3	2.3	–	–	27.5*
1962–63	Pittsburgh (ABL)	16	–	41.8	.491	–	.770	12.8	2.6	–	–	27.9
1967–68†	Pittsburgh (ABA)	70	–	**44.9***	**.519**	**.222**	.764	**13.5**	4.6	–	–	26.8*
1968–69	Minnesota (ABA)	47	–	39.4	.511	.136	.767	11.4	3.9	–	–	**30.2**
1969–70	Phoenix	**81**	–	40.9	.490	–	.779	10.4	4.8	–	–	24.6
1970–71	Phoenix	71	–	37.5	.434	–	**.816**	9.1	4.5	–	–	20.9
1971–72	Phoenix	76	–	36.8	.459	–	.807	8.3	3.9	–	–	21.0
1972–73	Phoenix	75	–	36.9	.479	–	.797	8.5	4.1	–	–	16.1
1973–74	Phoenix	8	–	27.9	.486	–	.667	7.2	5.2	1.4	1.0	11.3
1973–74	L.A. Lakers	71	–	35.7	.502	–	.772	7.4	**5.3**	**1.5**	**1.4**	12.8
1974–75	L.A. Lakers	43	–	23.9	.429	–	.687	4.6	2.8	1.2	.5	8.0
1975–76	Atlanta	74	–	25.8	.447	–	.712	6.0	2.9	1.1	.6	8.2
Career		710	–	37.0	.484	.162	.780	9.4	3.9	.3	.2	19.9

=== Playoffs ===
Year	Team	GP	GS	MPG	FG%	3P%	FT%	RPG	APG	SPG	BPG	PPG
1962	Pittsburgh (ABL)	1	–	**53.0**	**.609**	–	**.929**	**17.0**	4.0	–	–	**41.0**
1968†	Pittsburgh (ABA)	**14**	–	44.0	.594	–	.729	12.3	4.6	–	–	29.9
1969	Minnesota (ABA)	7	–	45.7	.378	**.500**	.645	12.3	3.9	–	–	24.9
1970	Phoenix	7	–	46.9	.413	–	.818	13.9	**5.9**	–	–	25.4
1974	L.A. Lakers	5	–	34.4	.350	–	.800	8.0	3.2	**1.4**	**.2**	10.8
Career		34	–	43.8	.473	.500	.743	12.1	4.5	1.4	.2	25.5

== Personal life and death ==
While playing with the Globetrotters, Hawkins married and started a family in Pittsburgh. Hawkins and his family continued to live in Pittsburgh for a time after he retired. The Hawkins' story up to 1971 is documented in the biography Foul by David Wolf, ISBN 978-0030860218

One of Hawkins' nephews is Jim McCoy Jr., who scored a school-record 2,374 career points for the UMass Minutemen basketball team from 1988 to 1992.

He was the grandfather of Shawn Hawkins, who played professional basketball internationally and was a two-time scoring champion in Taiwan's Super Basketball League (SBL).

Hawkins moved to Phoenix, Arizona, and worked in community relations for the Suns until his death from cancer on October 6, 2017, at the age of 75.

== In popular culture ==
In a skit for NBC's Saturday Night Live in 1975, Hawkins played against singer Paul Simon in a one-on-one game accompanied by Simon's song "Me and Julio Down by the Schoolyard." The skit was presented as a schoolyard challenge between the two and had Simon winning, despite the disparity in height between the two men (Simon at 5 ft 3 in, Hawkins at 6 ft 8 in).

Hawkins’ story is the topic of a song titled "The Legend of Connie Hawkins" by Dispatch on their 2021 album Break Our Fall.

The Pittsburgh Pisces basketball team and the character Moses Guthrie, played by Julius Erving, in the movie The Fish That Saved Pittsburgh drew inspiration from Hawkins and the Pittsburgh Pipers of the ABA. Hawkins was in the movie.

== See also ==
- List of NBA retired numbers
- List of people banned or suspended by the NBA
