= Pittsburgh Condors =

Defunct professional basketball team in Pittsburgh, Pennsylvania

Pittsburgh Pipers Pittsburgh Condors
- Conference: None
- Division: Eastern Division
- League: ABA
- Founded: 1967
- History: Pittsburgh Pipers; 1967–1968; 1969–1970; Minnesota Pipers; 1968–1969; Pittsburgh Condors; 1970–1972
- Arena: Pittsburgh Civic Arena (1967–68, 1969–1972); Metropolitan Sports Center (1968–69)
- Location: Pittsburgh, Pennsylvania
- Team colors: Blue and Orange (1967–1970); Red and Gold (1970-72)
- Team manager: Vern Mikkelsen 1967–1968; Marty Blake 1970–1972
- Head coach: Vince Cazzetta; 1967–1968; Jim Harding, Vern Mikkelsen, and Gus Young; 1968–1969; John Clark and Buddy Jeannette; 1969–1970; Jack McMahon; 1970–1971; Jack McMahon and Mark Binstein; 1971–1972
- Ownership: Gabe Rubin 1967–1969; Metro Sports; Haven Industries 1970–1972
- Championships: 1 (1968)
- Division titles: 1 (1968)

The Pittsburgh Condors were a professional basketball team in the original American Basketball Association (ABA). Originally called the Pittsburgh Pipers, they were a charter franchise of the ABA and captured the first league title. The team played their home games in Pittsburgh's Civic Arena.

== History ==
=== Pittsburgh Pipers - First ABA Champions (1967–68) ===
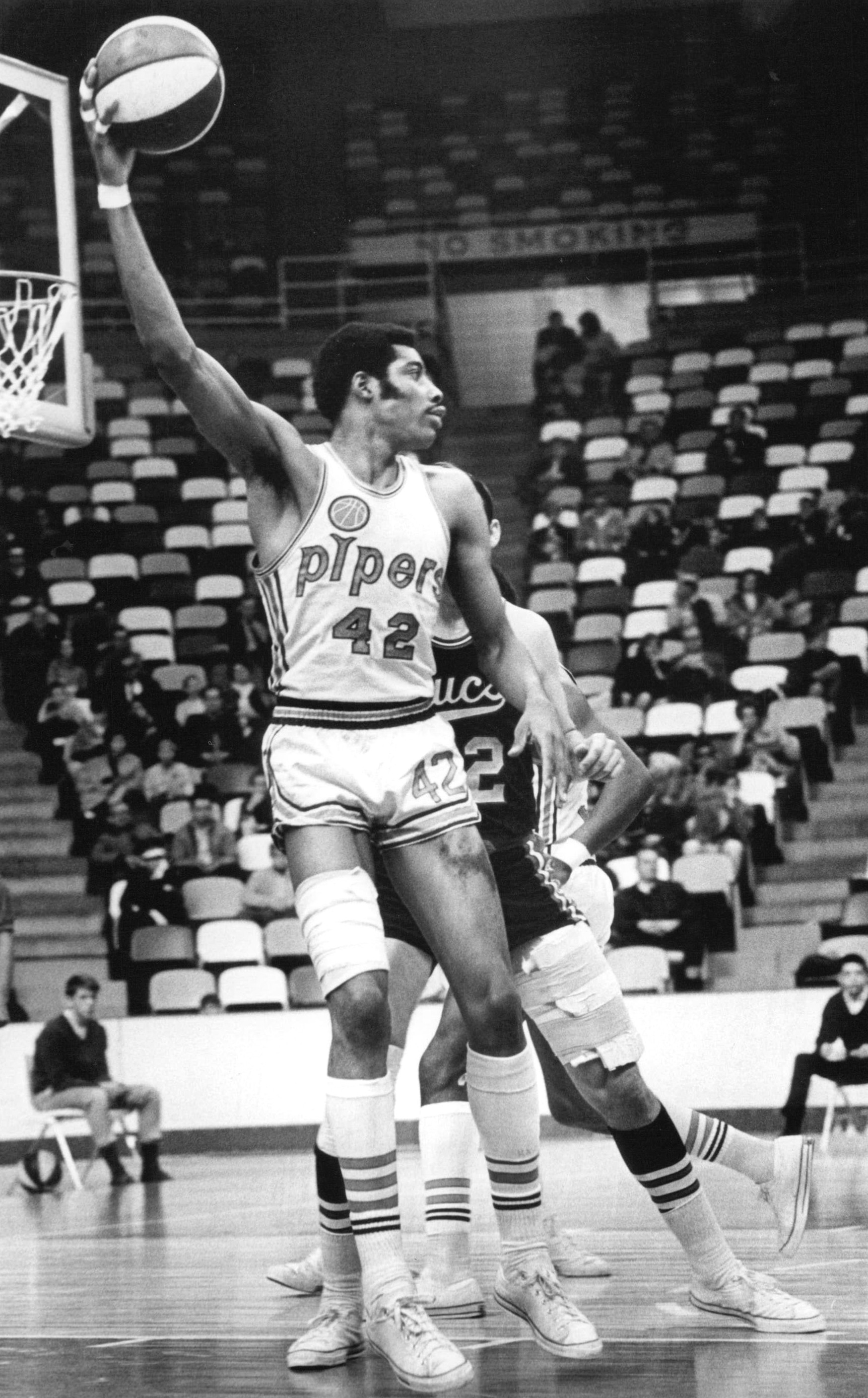
Connie Hawkins in 1968–69 at Met Center in Bloomington, Minnesota

The Pipers were one of the ABA's inaugural franchises in 1967. There had been an interest in potentially having an expansion team play in Pittsburgh in 1967 for the National Basketball Association (NBA), but the league ultimately went with Seattle. The team was co-owned by Jason Shapiro (of National Record Mart) and Gabe Rubin, who had partnered with Lenny Litman to run the downtown Penn Theater.

On June 13, 1967, team president Gabe Rubin selected the name of the team to be "Pipers" while signing a three-year deal to play games in the Civic Arena. Rubin stated in the press that he picked the name because he "liked the way it sounded" and wanted to eschew a long process for a name selection.

The team had great success on the court, posting the league's best record during the regular season (54–24, .692) and winning the league's first ABA Championship. The Pipers were led by their star player, ABA MVP and future Hall-of-Famer Connie Hawkins, who led the ABA in scoring at 26.8 ppg. The Pipers swept through the 1968 ABA Playoffs and defeated the New Orleans Buccaneers 4 games to 3 to take the title, with Hawkins earning Finals MVP honors. The ABA title remains Pittsburgh's only pro basketball championship.

Coupled with the Philadelphia 76ers' NBA championship one year earlier, Pennsylvania had two professional basketball champions in as many years. Despite this, the team did not have a championship ring until over three decades later when players came up with money to have rings made.

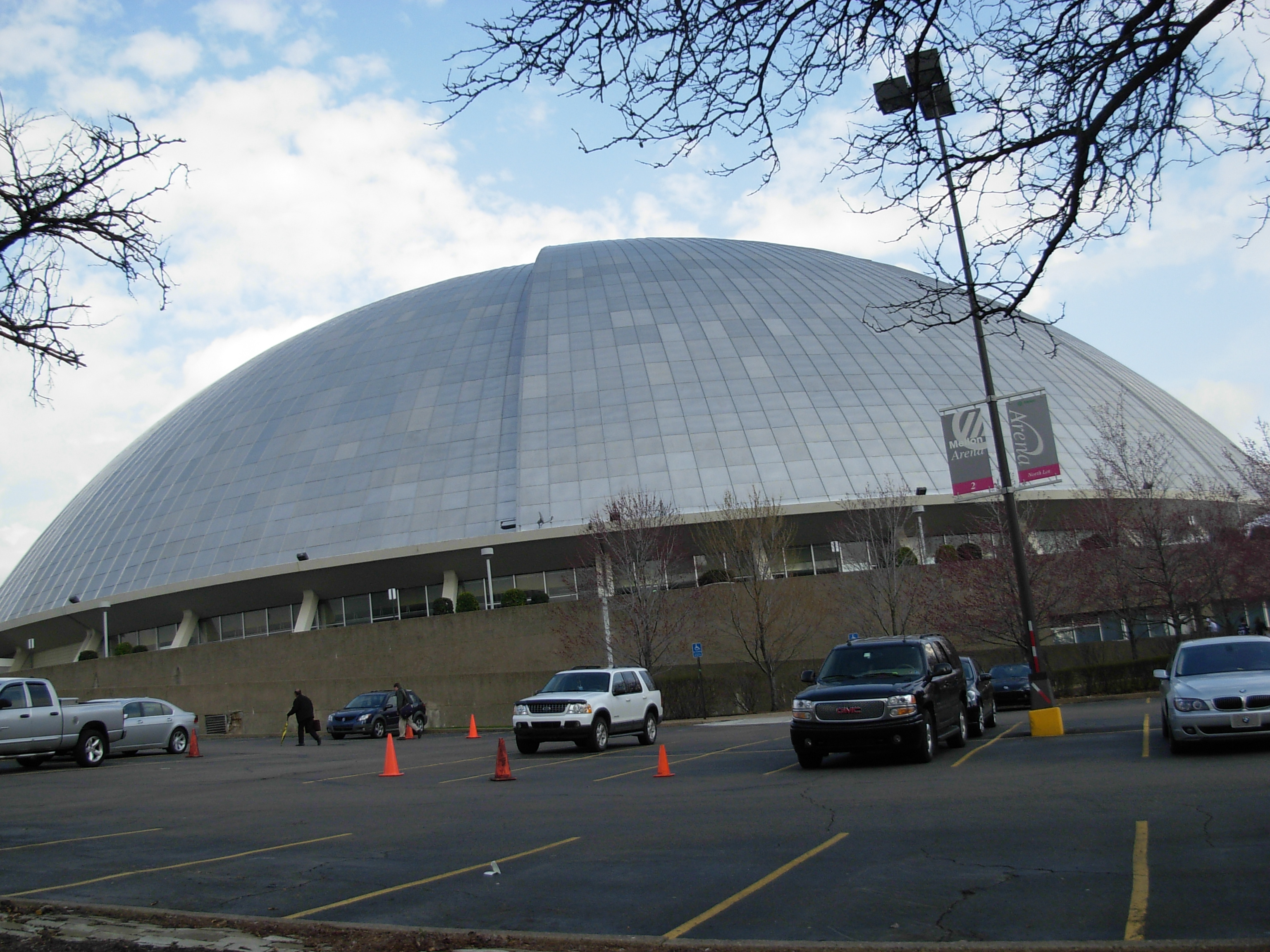
The Civic Arena was home to the franchise during their time in Pittsburgh.

The Pipers shared the Pittsburgh Civic Arena with the city's expansion National Hockey League team, the Pittsburgh Penguins. The Pipers attracted fairly respectable gates by ABA standards, averaging 3,200 fans per game.

=== Minnesota Pipers (1968–69) ===
Despite the championship and strong attendance figures in Pittsburgh, the Pipers franchise left Pittsburgh after their 1968 ABA Championship and moved to Minnesota on June 28, 1968, becoming the Minnesota Pipers. Previously, Minnesota was left vacant when the Minnesota Muskies had trouble drawing people in the league's first season and moved to Miami to become the Miami Floridians. The ABA league office was based in Minneapolis (home of league commissioner George Mikan), so the Pipers moved when a Minneapolis attorney Bill Erickson (who formerly served as legal counsel for the ABA) bought a majority share of the team and coaxed Rubin to move the team. As with the Muskies, their home arena was Bloomington's Metropolitan Sports Center.

The team made the playoffs in a turbulent year that saw multiple head coaches, one of whom fought Rubin at the banquet for the All-Star Game and got fired. They reached the playoffs but ironically lost to the Floridians in the First Round. However, the Pipers' attendance settings fared no better than the Muskies and they moved back to Pittsburgh after only one season. On July 21, 1969, Rubin announced that he would move the team back to Pittsburgh, stating that the first move was "a genuine mistake". When in Pittsburgh, it was reported they had lost $334,532 and drew just 3,208 people a game. When they went to Minnesota, they dropped in attendance to 2,263 a game and lost double their money.

In Terry Pluto's book on the ABA, Loose Balls, Pipers co-owner Gabe Rubin says he returned to the Steel City because he couldn't think of anywhere else to go. Professional basketball returned to Minnesota with the formation of the Timberwolves in 1989.

=== Return of the Pittsburgh Pipers (1969–70) ===
For the first season back in Pittsburgh the team retained the "Pipers" nickname. However, the team failed to match their previous success and fans stayed away. After the season, in May of 1970, Haven Industries, maker of the "Jack Frost" brand of sugar products, bought the team and decided a name change was in order.

=== Pittsburgh Condors (1970–1972) ===
==== 1970–71 season ====
It was reported in late May 1970 that the team launched a name contest that would run until June 6. Early suggestions for names ranged from ones relating to the city such as "Bridgers" and "Allemonos" (in reference to the spans across the rivers in the city) to "Pedros" to even "Zodiacs". Strangely enough, on June 25, 1970, the winning entry for the name (of around 2,000 selections) contest was by Donald E. Seymour, a law student that received lifetime seats and $500 for his entry – Pioneers. The team would use the nickname for acquisitions for the remainder of the month, but soon encountered trouble. In early July, a woman named Angela B. Weaver (of Wexford, Pennsylvania) actually sued the team in common pleas court because she claimed that her entry of "Pioneers" actually won the contest because the rules said an explanation had to be "25 words or under", and Seymore's apparently was 57 words. It was also reported in the media at the time that the name "Pioneers" should be discarded quickly because the downtown NAIA school Point Park College (now Point Park University) was already using the nickname. Point Park College was soon reported to be in meetings with Pittsburgh management about the nickname. Ownership resolved the objection and under the suggestion of general manager Marty Blake, the ABA team changed their name to "Condors", as reported on July 23, 1970. Blake called the condor a "regal bird", although he expressed ignorance at the fact that the condor was part of the vulture family and that it thus thrived on dead animals.

Jack McMahon took over as coach. John Brisker and Mike Lewis played in the 1971 ABA All-Star Game, but the Condors could only manage a 36–48 record, fifth place in the Eastern Division and out of the playoffs (one game behind The Floridians). While the Condors had a potent offense (fifth in the 11-team ABA with 119.1 points per game), they were often undone by their defense (fourth-worst, allowing 121.8 ppg). Attendance remained poor, with an announced average of 2,806, though some observers close to the team thought the actual average was less than half that. After a slow (4–8) start, Blake decided (in an infamous ABA stunt) to give away every available seat for an early-season game against Florida on November 17. The game attracted the biggest crowd that the team would ever draw under the Condors name as 11,012 tickets were given out; however, only 8,074 (in a 12,300-seat arena) actually showed up. (3,000 season ticket holders didn't even bother to attend the contest, which Pittsburgh lost, 122–116.) Ownership was not amused, and Blake was fired soon after.

The most memorable moment of the season came when Charlie "Helicopter" Hentz destroyed two backboards in a game against the Carolina Cougars.

==== 1971–72 season ====
For the next season, Haven tried to change the Condors' image, with a new logo and uniforms, plus a slick marketing campaign. In October, they lured the defending NBA champion Milwaukee Bucks (and star Lew Alcindor) to Pittsburgh for an exhibition game, guaranteeing the Bucks $25,000. A local ad proclaimed "Bring on Alcindor" and that "the ABA–NBA merger is here". (The merger would not actually happen until 1976, and it would not include Pittsburgh.) Unfortunately for the Condors, Alcindor — who had changed his name to Kareem Abdul-Jabbar just a few days before the game — was injured and did not play (the Bucks won anyway, 129–115). Only 8,881 fans showed up, and the Condors "took a bath" on the deal—not a good start for the season.

After a 4–6 start, general manager Mark Binstein fired McMahon and named himself head coach, citing a need for the team to have "more discipline". The move backfired disastrously; the Condors only went 21–50 the rest of the way.

As the season progressed, attendance dropped below 1,000 fans per game, fueling speculation the Condors would fold before Christmas. While they did manage to survive into the New Year, Haven had finally seen enough and announced the Condors would be playing elsewhere for the 1972–73 season. In the meantime, they began relocating home games, first to other cities in Pennsylvania, and then to farther-away places. On March 24, 1972, the Condors hosted the Kentucky Colonels in Birmingham, Alabama; four days later, the Condors hosted the Colonels again, this time in their last 'home' game, in Tucson, Arizona.

John Brisker and George Thompson played in the ABA All-Star Game. The Condors finished in sixth place in the Eastern Division at 25–59 and failed to make the playoffs. They averaged 2,215 fans per home game — a figure that would have been even lower if not for the gates brought in at both Birmingham (an estimated 3,000) and Tucson (reported as 5,000). These were significantly better than the ones in Pittsburgh; the Condors drew only 689 at their final game at the Civic Center.

=== Decline and folding ===
Haven and the league tried to move the Condors to a bigger market. It was said that some locations that the team and the ABA were looking into, in addition to Birmingham and Tucson, were El Paso, New Haven, and even Cincinnati and San Diego. The Floridians were also looking at the latter two locations around the same time period. However, they were unable to do so, and on June 13, 1972, the ABA shut down the Condors, alongside The Floridians. The Condors' roster was put into a dispersal draft; George Thompson went to the Memphis Tams, Mike Lewis to the Carolina Cougars, Skeeter Swift and James Silas to the Dallas Chaparrals, and Walt Szczerbiak to the Kentucky Colonels. John Brisker jumped to the Seattle SuperSonics of the NBA soon afterward. Ironically, a new team would replace both The Floridians and Pittsburgh franchises in San Diego with the San Diego Conquistadors later that year becoming the league's only expansion franchise.

== Hall of Famers ==
Pittsburgh Pipers/Condors Hall of Famers
Players
No.	Name	Position	Tenure	Inducted
42	Connie Hawkins	F/C	1967–1969	1992
Coaches
Name		Position	Tenure	Inducted
Buddy Jeannette ^{1}		Head coach	1969–1970	1994
Vern Mikkelsen ^{1}		Head coach	1968–1969	1995

Notes:

- ^{1} Inducted as a player. Never played for the franchise.

== Season-by-season ==
Season	League	Division	Finish	W	L	Win%	Playoffs	Awards
Pittsburgh Pipers
1967–68	ABA	Eastern	1st	54	24	.692	Won Division Semifinals (Pacers) 3–0; Won Division Finals (Muskies) 4–1; Won ABA Finals (Buccaneers) 4–3	Connie Hawkins (ABA MVP, Playoffs MVP); Vince Cazzetta (COY)
Minnesota Pipers
1968–69	ABA	Eastern	4th	36	42	.462	Lost Division Semifinals (Floridians) 3–4	–
Pittsburgh Pipers
1969–70	ABA	Eastern	5th	29	55	.345	Did not qualify	
Pittsburgh Condors
1970–71	ABA	Eastern	5th	36	48	.429	Did not qualify	
1971–72	ABA	Eastern	6th	25	59	.298	Did not qualify	
