= 1970–71 Texas Chaparrals season =

- Head coach: Max Williams (5–14); Bill Blakeley (25–40)
- Arena: Moody Coliseum; Tarrant County Coliseum; Lubbock Municipal Coliseum; Dallas Memorial Auditorium

Results
- Record: 30–54 (.357)
- Place: Division: 4th (Western)
- Playoff finish: Division Semifinals (lost to the Stars 0–4)

The 1970–71 Texas Chaparrals season was the fourth season of the Chaparrals in the American Basketball Association and their only season representing the entirety of Texas as a whole. In order to try to attract more fans, the Chaparrals adopted the Texas moniker, even playing games in Fort Worth, Texas, at the Tarrant County Coliseum along with Lubbock, Texas, at the Lubbock Municipal Coliseum. This practice was scrapped after the season concluded, along with the Texas moniker, as the team name was reverted to the Dallas Chaparrals name before the next season. For the fourth straight year, the Chaps made the playoffs, but for the third straight year in a row they bowed out in the Division Semifinals, once again to Utah.

== Roster ==
1970-71 Texas Chaparrals roster
Players

Pos.	No.	Player	Height	Weight	DOB	From
SG	24	Charles Beasley	6 ft 5 in (1.96 m)	190 lb (86 kg)	1945-09-23	SMU
PF	44	John Beasley	6 ft 9 in (2.06 m)	225 lb (102 kg)	1944-02-05	Texas A&M
PF	22	Bob Bedell	6 ft 7 in (2.01 m)	205 lb (93 kg)	1944-06-26	Stanford
PF	40	Gary Bradds	6 ft 8 in (2.03 m)	210 lb (95 kg)	1942-07-26	Ohio State
C	43	Bobby Croft	6 ft 10 in (2.08 m)	200 lb (91 kg)	1946-03-17	Tennessee
C	50	Willie Davis	6 ft 8 in (2.03 m)	234 lb (106 kg)	1945-08-09	North Texas
SG	34	Tom Hagan	6 ft 3 in (1.91 m)	185 lb (84 kg)	1947-01-29	Vanderbilt
PG	11	Joe Hamilton	5 ft 10 in (1.78 m)	160 lb (73 kg)	1948-07-05	North Texas
SF	33	Rich Jones	6 ft 6 in (1.98 m)	220 lb (100 kg)	1946-12-27	Illinois
C	55	Gene Moore	6 ft 9 in (2.06 m)	225 lb (102 kg)	1945-07-29	Saint Louis
PF	31	Greg Wittman	6 ft 8 in (2.03 m)	210 lb (95 kg)	1947-05-10	Western Carolina

Coaches
Head coach
- Max Williams & Bill Blakeley

Legend
- (DP) Unsigned draft pick
- (FA) Free agent
- (S) Suspended
- Injured

Roster

== Transactions ==
=== Trades ===
January 6, 1971	To Texas Chaparrals Levern Tart; Ed Johnson	To New York Nets Manny Leaks
January 6, 1971	To Texas Chaparrals Donnie Freeman; Wayne Hightower	To Utah Stars Ron Boone; Glen Combs

== Final standings ==
=== Western Division ===
Western Division	W	L	PCT	GB
Indiana Pacers *	58	26	.690	-
Utah Stars *	57	27	.679	1.0
Memphis Pros *	41	43	.488	17.0
Texas Chaparrals *	30	54	.357	28.0
Denver Rockets	30	54	.357	28.0

== ABA Playoffs ==
1971 playoff game log
ABA Fourth Place Tiebreaker Match

Game	Date	Team	Score	High points	High rebounds	High assists	Location	Series
1	April 1	@ Denver	W 115–109	Donnie Freeman (33)	Moore (16)	Donnie Freeman (6)	Denver Auditorium Arena; 2,594	1–0

ABA Division Semifinals: 0–4 (home: 0–2; road: 0–2)

Game	Date	Team	Score	High points	High rebounds	High assists	Location	Series
1	April 2	@ Utah	L 115–125	Donnie Freeman (32)	John Beasley (11)		Salt Palace; 4,375	0–1
2	April 3	@ Utah	L 107–137	Donnie Freeman (23)	Croft, Moore (9)		Salt Palace; 6,061	0–2
3	April 4	Utah	L 101–113	Donnie Freeman (30)	Gene Moore (15)		Moody Coliseum; 4,675	0–3
4	April 6	Utah	L 107–128	Levern Tart (31)	Gene Moore (18)		Moody Coliseum; 3,666	0–4

1971 schedule

== Awards and honors ==
1971 ABA All-Star Game selections (game played on January 23, 1971)

- Donnie Freeman
