= Wayne Hightower =

American basketball player (1940–2002)

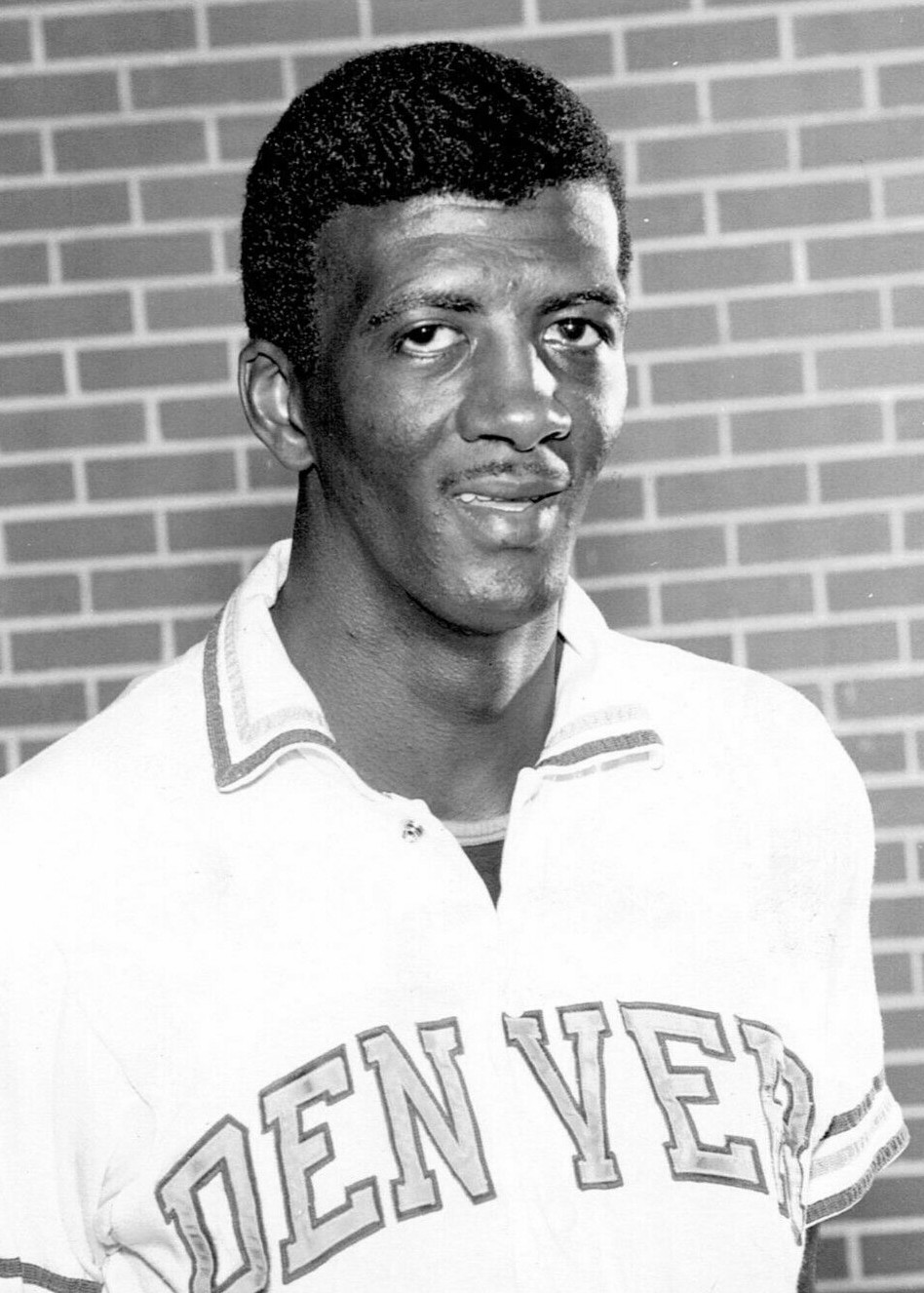
- Hightower in 1969

Personal information
- Born: January 14, 1940 Philadelphia, Pennsylvania, U.S.
- Died: April 18, 2002 (aged 62) Philadelphia, Pennsylvania, U.S.
- Listed height: 6 ft 8 in (2.03 m)
- Listed weight: 192 lb (87 kg)

Career information
- High school: Overbrook (Philadelphia, Pennsylvania)
- College: Kansas (1959–1961)
- NBA draft: 1962: 1st round, 7th overall pick
- Drafted by: San Francisco Warriors
- Playing career: 1961–1972
- Position: Power forward
- Number: 55, 20, 12, 54, 35

Career history
- 1961–1962: Real Madrid
- 1962–1965: San Francisco Warriors
- 1965–1967: Baltimore Bullets
- 1965–1966: Harrisburg Patriots
- 1967: Detroit Pistons
- 1967–1969: Denver Rockets
- 1969–1971: Los Angeles / Utah Stars
- 1971: Texas Chaparrals
- 1971–1972: Carolina Cougars

Career highlights
- Spanish League Top Scorer (1962); EPBL All-Star (1966); ABA All-Star (1969); Third-team All-American – NABC (1961); Second-team Parade All-American (1958)

Career NBA and ABA statistics
- Points: 6,568 (11.6 ppg)
- Rebounds: 3,966 (7.0 rpg)
- Assists: 959 (1.7 apg)
- Stats at NBA.com
- Stats at Basketball Reference

Wayne A. Hightower (January 14, 1940 – April 18, 2002) was an American professional basketball player who had a long and productive career in the National Basketball Association (NBA) and American Basketball Association (ABA) from 1962 to 1972. He stood 6 foot 8 inches (2.03 m) and primarily played the forward positions. He was born in Philadelphia, Pennsylvania and attended Overbrook High School from 1955 to 1958, where he played basketball. His professional career began in 1961 after his departure from the University of Kansas at the end his junior year. Hightower stated he did so to financially support his family, but he would have been ineligible to play basketball his senior year due to his poor academic standing.

NBA rules barred players with college eligibility from being drafted or signed to a team, so Hightower signed with the Pittsburgh Rens of the upstart American Basketball League (ABL) for the 1961–62 season. The ABL's commissioner voided the contract when the Kansas City Steers protested that they had territorial rights to Hightower since he went to the University of Kansas. Instead of signing with the Steers, Hightower joined the Spanish team Real Madrid Baloncesto. He was both the EuroLeague Finals Top Scorer and the Spanish League Top Scorer in 1962.

During the 1962 NBA draft, the San Francisco Warriors selected Hightower in the first round with the seventh overall pick. In the NBA, Hightower played for the Warriors (1962–65), the Baltimore Bullets (1965–1967) and the Detroit Pistons (1967). After joining the ABA in 1967, he played for the Denver Rockets (1967–69), the Los Angeles / Utah Stars (1969–71), the Texas Chaparrals (1971) and the Carolina Cougars (1971–72). He also played for the Harrisburg Patriots of the Eastern Professional Basketball League during parts of the 1965–66 season, while still under contract with the Baltimore Bullets.

During the off-season before the 1967–68 season, Hightower was one of the first active NBA players to sign with the fledgling ABA, which lent credibility to the new league. Denver Rockets head coach and general manager Bob Bass would later say that the acquisition of Hightower was the most important moment in the team's first year. During parts of his ABA career, Hightower would serve as the vice president of the ABA Players Association, a labor union that represented the league's players. In 1973, Hightower sued the ABA for backed wages and damages. He claimed he was blacklisted from professional basketball. The parties settled the case the following year.

After his basketball career was over, Hightower volunteered for the Peace Corps, which dispatched him to Tunisia. He later returned to his hometown of Philadelphia, where he coached youth basketball. Hightower had poor cardiac health. During his tenure with the Chaparrals, Hightower was diagnosed with a blood clot in his leg. In 1988, he estimated that had suffered three or four heart attacks over his life. He died of a heart attack on April 18, 2002, aged 62, in Philadelphia.

== Amateur career ==
=== High school ===
Hightower attended Overbrook High School in Philadelphia, Pennsylvania, and played on the school's varsity basketball team. He was the first selection to the all-public basketball team by the Philadelphia Inquirer during the 1956–57 season. He was also named second team all-Pennsylvania by the United Press International (UPI) and third team all-Pennsylvania by the Associated Press (AP) that season.

In December 1957, Overbrook won the Cambria County War Memorial Basketball Tournament after they defeated Charleroi High School, 72–58. Hightower was named the tournament's most outstanding player. The UPI named Hightower to the first all-Pennsylvania high school basketball team during the 1957–58 season. Overbrook defeated Bishop Neumann High School for the 1958 Philadelphia High School Basketball Championship. Following the tournament, Hightower was named the Philadelphia Inquirer Most Valuable Player. At the end of the season, Hightower was named second team All-American by Parade. In 1999, Gannett News Service writer Dave Krider named the 1957–58 Overbrook team the eighth best high school basketball team of the 20th century.

Following his senior season, Hightower played for the Chester Times All-Star basketball team at the YMCA in Chester, Pennsylvania. During the summer, with school out of session, Hightower played in the Wildwood Crest, New Jersey Basketball League and the Catskills Basketball League at Shawanga Lodge. The AP reported that at least 33 colleges showed interest in recruiting Hightower, who was drawing comparisons to former Overbrook center Wilt Chamberlain. Jack McCloskey, the head coach of Penn Quakers men's basketball team, told sportswriter Ronnie Christ that he tried to recruit Hightower – but due to his poor grades he would not be accepted by the university.

=== College ===
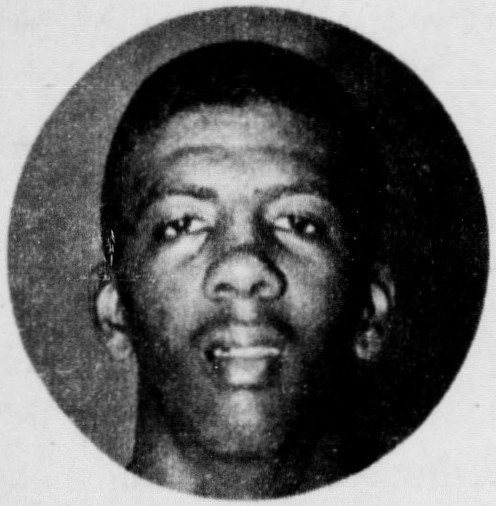
Hightower, circa 1958

Hightower played college basketball at Kansas, with the Kansas Jayhawks. He played on the freshman basketball team during the 1958–59 season. He averaged 25.7 points per game, but other stats for the season are unavailable. During the summer, he returned to Pennsylvania and played in the Narberth Summer League. His first season on the Kansas varsity team was 1959–1960. Hightower played in 28 games and averaged 21.8 points per game and 10.1 rebounds. He led the Big Eight Conference in scoring and was second in rebounding on the Jayhawks behind center Bill Bridges. Kansas finished with a first place record in the Big Eight (10–4 in conference, 19–9 overall) during the 1959–60 season. During the semi-finals for the Midwest region of the 1960 NCAA University Division basketball tournament, Kansas was matched up against the Texas Longhorns. The Jayhawks, led by a 34-point performance from Hightower, won the game 90–81. During the finals of the Midwest region on March 12, Hightower shot 8 for 24 from the field and scored a total of 22 points against the Cincinnati Bearcats. Kansas lost the game 82–71 and was eliminated from the tournament. After the season, Hightower returned to the Narberth Basketball League in Pennsylvania, where he played for a team coached by Jack McKinney.

Hightower gave an interview to the Philadelphia Daily News in 1960 criticizing the selection process for the United States men's national basketball team leading up to the 1960 Summer Olympics in Rome, Italy. He was named an alternate for the team, but was never allowed to practice. Dutch Lonborg, the athletic director of the University of Kansas and the chairman of the United States men's basketball Olympic committee, sent a letter to Hightower telling him that no alternates would be selected for the team as all of the original selectees agreed to join the team. Furthermore, Lonborg wrote that, "I believe Jim Darrow and possibly Dick Boushka would be the coach's first and second choice [for alternates]." Hightower called for transparency in the Olympic select committee process.

In 1960, Hightower said he was considering joining an Amateur Athletic Union team at the conclusion of his college career instead of signing with a professional club. The Buchan Bakers of Seattle, Washington, reached out to Hightower and asked him to commit to joining their team. Hightower stated he had interest in joining the Phillips 66ers of Bartlesville, Oklahoma, but thought it was a longshot due to his race. In the summer of the 1960, Hightower served as a councilor at Camp Canadensis where Neil Johnston and Jack Ramsay were running a youth basketball camp.

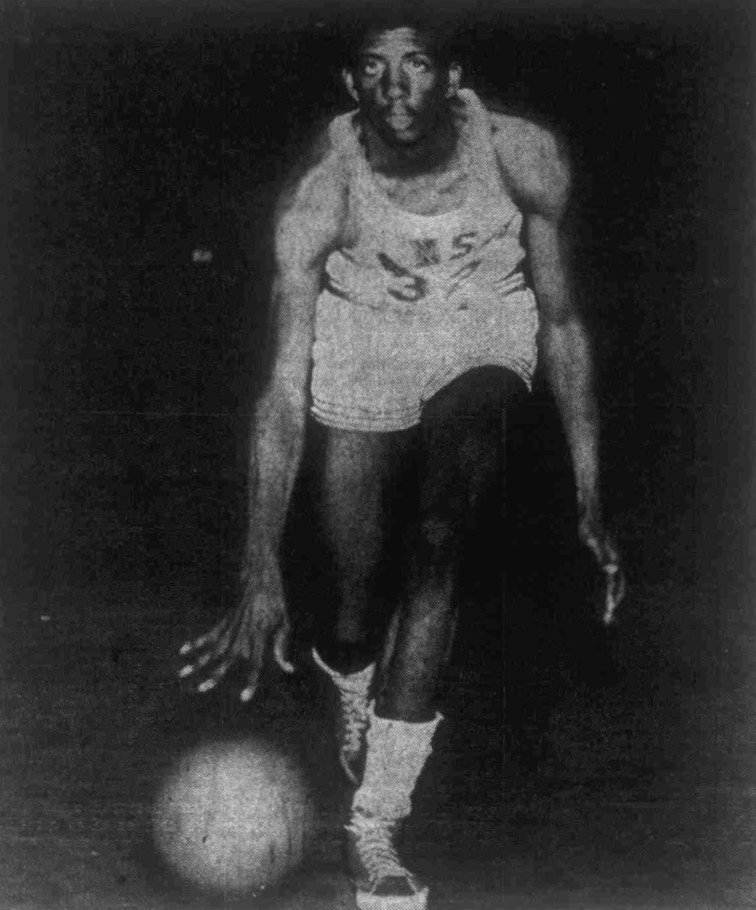
Hightower played for the Kansas Jayhawks from 1958 to 1961.

Throughout his college basketball career, Hightower wore one high-top shoe on his right foot and one low-top on his left foot. The right shoe was a size 13 and the left shoe was a size 13 1/2. Around the University of Kansas campus, Hightower was known as being interested in fashion and he regularly drove a white convertible with his initials, W. H., on the trunk. People referred to Hightower as "The Dragon", but he stated he did not know why people called him that. According to Hightower, his social life was non-existent as none of the Kansas fraternities wanted African Americans at their parties. Despite that, Hightower said he was not subject to racial segregation when the team traveled. Only once, when the team was in North Carolina, did he get denied service at a hotel. In response, the entire team left the hotel and opted to stay at the University of North Carolina at Chapel Hill infirmary.

On March 11, 1961, Hightower was ejected from a game against the Missouri Tigers after getting into a fist fight with Tigers player Charley Henke and several spectators. Henke was also ejected from the game. He was the third junior in Big Eight Conference history to score 1,000 career points, the others being Wilt Chamberlain and Clyde Lovellette. At the conclusion of his junior season, Hightower averaged 20.7 points per game and 11.6 rebounds in 25 games played. Before his senior season, Hightower announced he was leaving the University of Kansas and moving back home to Philadelphia, Pennsylvania to financially support his mother, two brothers and sister. The Associated Press reported that Hightower would have been ineligible to play basketball during his senior season due to his poor grades. He finished his varsity career at Kansas with 1,128 total points scored and 573 rebounds in 53 games.

== Professional career ==
=== First professional season (1961–62) ===
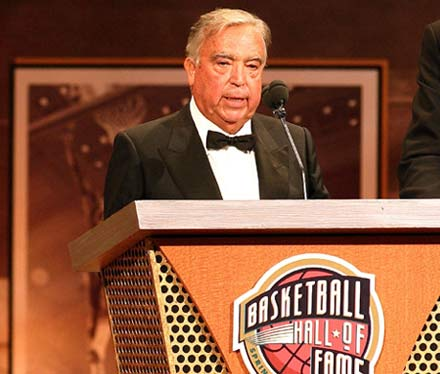
Real Madrid head coach Pedro Ferrándiz traveled to Philadelphia in 1961 to recruit Hightower to join his team.

After leaving college, Hightower signed with the Pittsburgh Rens of the American Basketball League for the 1961–62 season. He reported to training camp, but a few days later his contract was voided when Kansas City Steers management entered a protest to league president Abe Saperstein. They alleged that the Rens violated their territorial draft rights when they signed Hightower and Saperstein agreed. Hightower stated he would transfer to Waynesburg University to finish his education, allowing the Rens to have his territorial rights, but he never followed through with the plan. He eventually left the Rens for a councilor position with a United Jewish Fund camp located in the Pocono Mountains. The Rens still hoped to keep Hightower on the payroll so he would play for them during 1962–63 season, when Kansas City's territorial rights to him would expire. Pittsburgh owner Lenny Litman sent Hightower an offer from the Easton Madisons of the Eastern Professional Basketball League (EPBL) that would be partially paid by the Rens, but Hightower declined the offer.

In September 1961, Hightower signed with the Allentown Jets of the EPBL. Before the start of the season, Hightower met Pedro Ferrándiz, the head coach of Real Madrid Baloncesto — who traveled to Philadelphia to offer Hightower a one-year contract worth $6,000 (equivalent to $64,644 in 2025). Hightower agreed to the offer and abandoned the Jets. He had also verbally committed to joining the Harlem Globetrotters, which he was unable to do after he moved to Spain. Angered over his acquisition of Hightower, Globetrotters owner Abe Saperstein sent Ferrándiz a letter threatening his arrest if he re-entered the United States. The two men would later form a friendship. Hightower led Real Madrid to the 1961–62 season Spanish national domestic league championship, and the 1962 final of FIBA European Champions Cup (now called EuroLeague), which the team lost. He led the Spanish League in scoring that season. Hightower scored 56 points in Real Madrid's 112–84 victory over Alsace de Bagnolet on December 23, 1961, in Paris, France. Following the season, he entered into contract negotiations with the Harlem Globetrotters, but never signed. Hightower finished his college education at the Complutense University of Madrid.

=== National Basketball Association (1962–67) ===
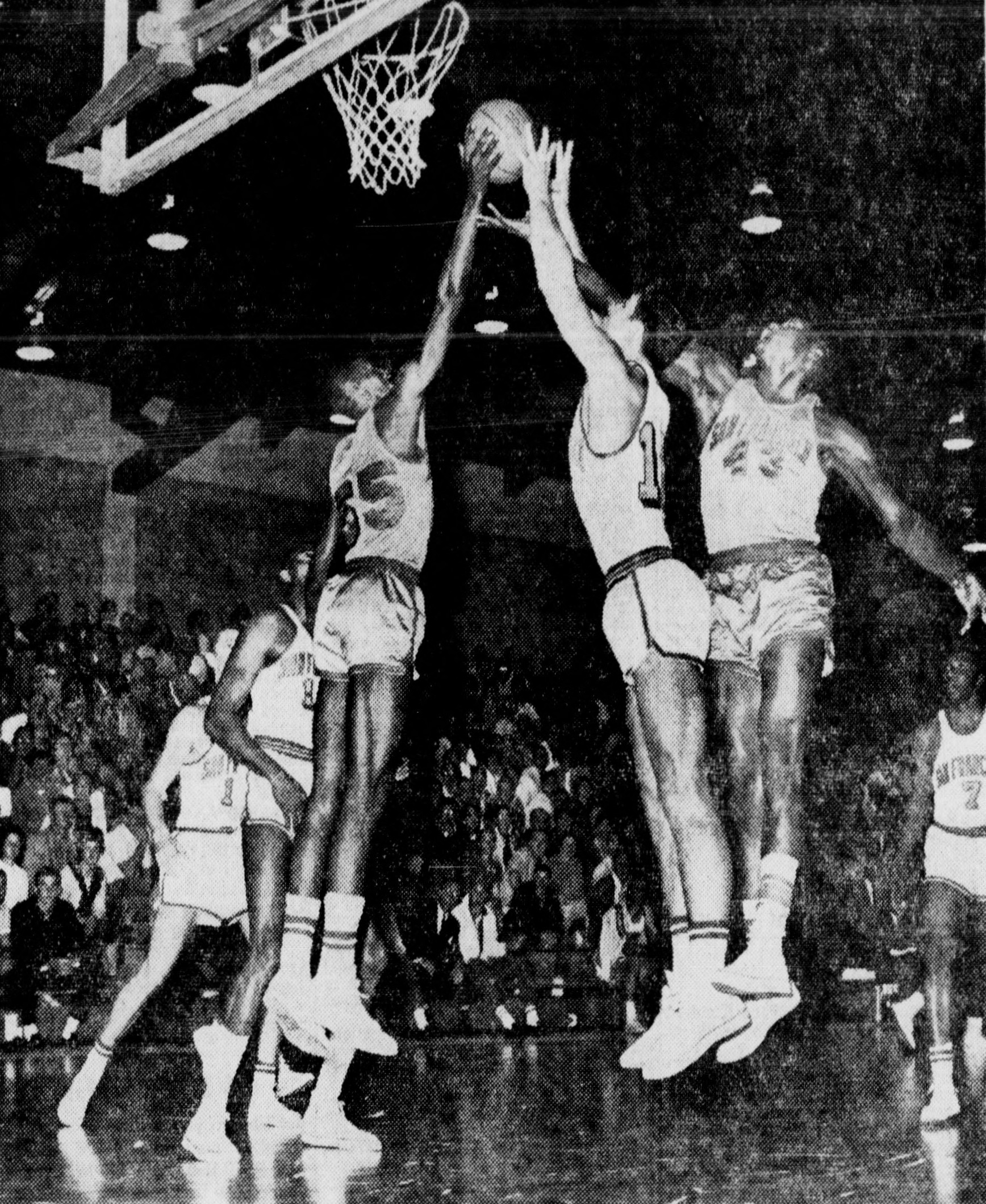
Hightower (#55) going for a rebound during a Warriors intra-squad scrimmage at Cabrillo College in Aptos, California, on October 17, 1962.

It was reported by Pittsburgh Post-Gazette sportswriter Jimmy Miller that the Philadelphia Warriors of the National Basketball Association (NBA) were paying Hightower $11,000 (equivalent to $117,079 in 2025) during the 1961–62 season to get him to sign the following season, when his college eligibility would expire. Miller's source was Pittsburgh Rens owner Lenny Littman. Warriors owner Eddie Gottlieb denied his team was paying Hightower and claimed Littman was lying to drum up publicity. Hightower reportedly told his friends that the only reason he would leave Spain was if he was drafted by Philadelphia. Later, Gottlieb stopped denying that the Warriors had paid Hightower, instead noting that he was eligible to be drafted by any team in the upcoming NBA draft. Gottlieb did not deny that if Hightower was drafted by another team Philadelphia would seek a reimbursement. New York Knicks owner Ned Irish traveled to Europe in 1962 and scouted Hightower. Irish was cautiously optimistic, saying Hightower played well, but noting the opposition was not comparable to the NBA. After the Warriors were eliminated from the 1962 NBA playoffs in the Eastern Division Finals by the Boston Celtics, Philadelphia head coach Frank McGuire told the media that his team would fare better next season if they could acquire Hightower. He was selected in the 1962 NBA draft, at fifth overall, by the Warriors (who relocated to San Francisco, California), with whom he played for three seasons.

On October 12, 1962, Hightower played in a charity game against the New York Knicks at Madison Square Garden for a team called the "College All-Stars". He received an unspecified injury during the pre-season. Hightower made his NBA regular season debut on October 23, 1962, in a 140–113 victory over the Detroit Pistons. He notched a double-double, with 18 points and 10 rebounds in 27 minutes played. During a loss to the St. Louis Hawks at Kiel Auditorium on January 20, 1963, Hightower scored a season high in points with 28 in 41 minutes played. By January, Philadelphia Daily News sportswriter Jack Kiser called Hightower "the biggest disappointment to hit the NBA in years". His play improved by February, which led Warriors coach Bob Feerick to start him in place of veteran Willie Naulls. During a game on March 5 against the Detroit Pistons, Hightower got into a physical altercation with Pistons center Walter Dukes. Hightower's teammate Wilt Chamberlain broke up the fight. He finished the season with an average of 7.4 points per game, 5.4 rebounds and 0.8 assists in 66 games played.

In July 1963, Hightower re-signed with San Francisco for the upcoming season. One head coach voted for Hightower on their 1964 NBA All-Star Game ballot, but he did not ultimately make the team. He sprained his ankle during the second game of the 1964 Western Division Finals on April 3, but played in the following game two days later—albeit in limited minutes. Warriors coach Alex Hannum publicly praised Hightower for playing through his injury. During the first quarter of the fifth game of the 1964 Western Division Finals on April 12, Hightower got into a physical altercation with St. Louis Hawks center Zelmo Beaty. Hightower was dragged away from the fight by his teammates as Warriors guard Al Attles shoved Beaty to the ground. The pinnacle of his NBA career came with the Warriors, when together his teammate and fellow Philadelphia native, Wilt Chamberlain, he reached the 1964 NBA Finals. Hightower recorded his best season that year (in the NBA), averaging 13.2 points and 7.2 rebounds per game.

On December 2, 1964, in a game against the Baltimore Bullets, Hightower fractured his nose and had three teeth loosened. He missed the next four games and made his return on December 12 against the Detroit Pistons. Since he was still recovering, Hightower wore a protective face mask that covered his nose.

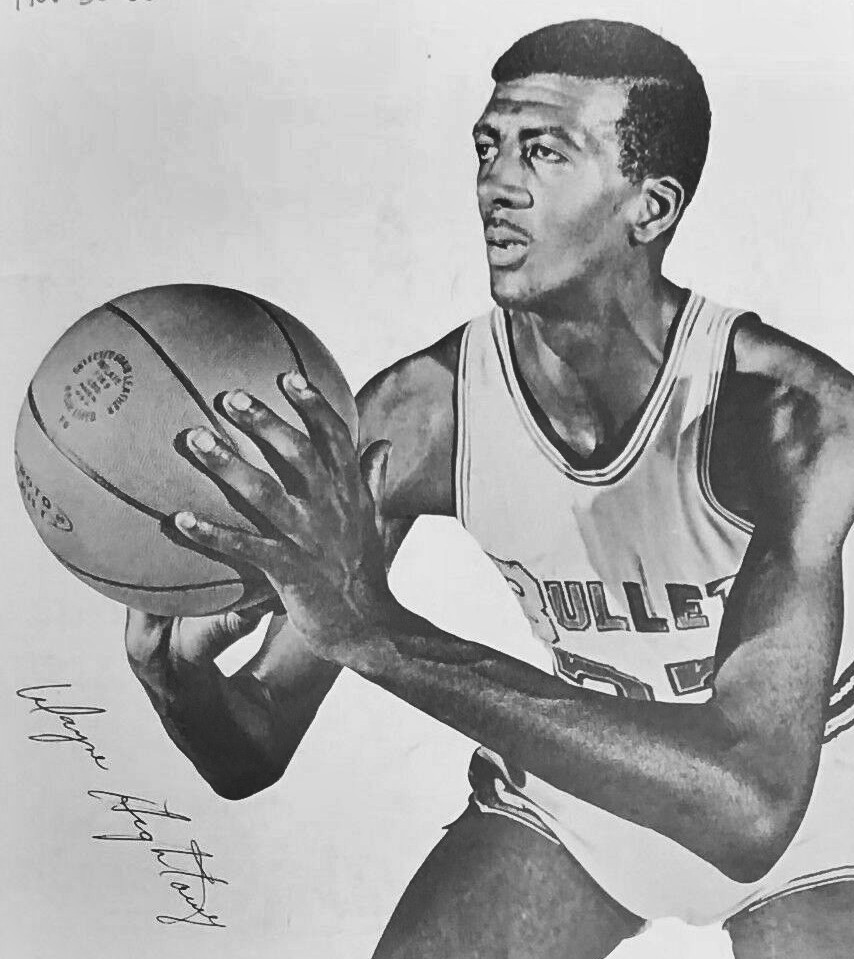
During the 1964–65 season, the San Francisco Warriors traded Hightower to the Baltimore Bullets. He played for them until 1967.

On February 3, 1965, the Baltimore Bullets announced they had traded for Hightower. In exchange, the San Francisco Warriors received cash considerations and a future Baltimore draft pick. Hightower admitted to having animosity towards the Warriors front office for the way the trade was handled. Hightower told The Baltimore Sun reporter Alan Goldstein, "This is supposed to be a big league operation right? Well then there should be some kind of protocol in informing a player he's going to be traded. I had heard rumors that I was going to Los Angeles or Baltimore, but when I'd ask club officials, they'd always say, 'Don't worry, Wayne, you won't be traded.' [...] They don't even take a man's family into consideration. My wife was really upset. Our child was just getting ready to start school out there and now we'll have to move." Hightower's former teammate, Wilt Chamberlain, later criticized the Warriors management for their lack of communication when it came his trade to the Philadelphia 76ers—as well as the way Hightower was treated during his trade. Hightower injured his wrist when he fell on the court in a game against the Los Angeles Lakers on February 6, which caused him to miss the game the following day against the Detroit Pistons. Hightower played 27 games for the Bullets that season, averaging 6.7 points per game, 6.4 rebounds and 0.6 assists. His combined averages between Baltimore and San Francisco were 7.8 points per game, 5.6 rebounds and 0.7 assists in 75 games played.

Hightower re-signed with the Bullets on September 1, 1965, for the upcoming season. During a game on November 19 against the Philadelphia 76ers, Hightower was unexpectedly absent. Bullets general manager Buddy Jeannette told the Baltimore Sun, "Unless he comes up with a good excuse like a sickness in the family or urgent personal business, he's going to be fined." On December 22, 1965, Hightower was sent to the Harrisburg Patriots of the Eastern Professional Basketball League (EPBL) to make room on Baltimore's roster Gus Johnson, who was returning from an injury. According to The Daily Times, Hightower clashed with Bullets head coach Paul Seymour, which was another reason posited for his demotion.

During his debut for Harrisburg on December 25, 1965, Hightower scored 41 points in a 137–128 loss to the Sunbury Mercuries. In January 1966 Hightower led all scorers with 33 points in Harrisburg's 134–127 victory over the Wilkes-Barre Barons. Hightower returned to the Baltimore roster briefly in early February 1966 as a replacement for Don Ohl, who was sidelined with a broken cheekbone. He was sent back down to Harrisburg on February 11, 1966, when Ohl returned to the team. After the move, he told a Baltimore Sun reporter that he was considering retirement. Baltimore recalled Hightower again in March. He was named to the EPBL All-Star team, but was unable to play in the game because he had been called up to the NBA. Jim Huggard was given the spot left vacant by Hightower on the EPBL All-Star team. He averaged 7.6 points per game, 5.5 rebounds and 1.5 assists in 24 games played for Baltimore. He played in 40 games for Harrisburg, but other statistics are not available. Hightower was not on the Bullets' roster during the 1966 NBA Playoffs.

In 1966, Hightower arrived early to the Bullets training camp and worked out with the team's rookies in a bid to impress management. He chipped a tooth during a pre-season scrimmage. He played 47 games for Baltimore during the 1966–67 season, averaging 6.9 points, 5.6 rebounds and 0.8 assists. On January 30, 1967, Hightower was sold by Baltimore to the Detroit Pistons for an undisclosed amount. The Bullets had offered Detroit their choice of Hightower, Johnny Green and Ben Warley. The acquisition of Hightower by Detroit convinced Ron Reed, who was coming off the bench for the Pistons that season, to focus solely on his professional baseball career. Reed was convinced that his already scarce playing time would be absorbed by Hightower. During his first game with the Pistons on January 31, Hightower scored two field goals in seven attempts in 14 minutes played. Detroit lost the game to the San Francisco Warriors, 106–108. He scored his season high in points (24) on February 12 in a victory over San Francisco. Six days later, in a game against Baltimore, Hightower recorded 15 rebounds. The Pistons won the game, 118–113. He played 29 games for Detroit and averaged 8.6 points, 5.7 rebounds and 1.0 assists.

=== American Basketball Association (1967–1972) ===
Hightower signed a contract with the Denver Rockets of the fledgling American Basketball Association (ABA) in May 1967. He was the third player who played the 1966–67 season in the NBA to sign with an ABA team, behind Jim Barnes and Erwin Mueller. He attended the Rockets training camp in September 1967, but left when he was offered a contract by his former team, the Detroit Pistons. He was waived by Detroit before the start of the NBA season and re-joined the Denver Rockets. On December 7, in a game against the Indiana Pacers, Hightower shot 10-for-10 from the field and scored 24 points. He scored 30 points on December 14 in a Rockets 95–93 victory over the Anaheim Amigos. On January 30, 1968, the Rockets were in Oakland, California, playing the Oakland Oaks. Hightower scored 15 points in the fourth quarter of the game as the Rockets trounced the Oaks, 137–113. During the inaugural ABA season, Hightower averaged 17.3 points per game, 7.2 rebounds and 1.9 assists in 74 games played. He was named an All-ABA honorable mention at the conclusion of the season.

Hightower re-signed with the Denver Rockets for two seasons in September 1968. He was selected for the 1969 ABA All-Star Game by the Western Division head coach Alex Hannum. During the game, Hightower scored six points and grabbed five rebounds in nine minutes played. At the conclusion of the season, Hightower had an average of 13.9 points per game 9.6 rebounds and a career best 3.0 assists in 67 games played. During the Rocket's playoff game against the Oakland Oaks on April 13, 1969, Hightower was poked in the eye in the second quarter. He left the game and did not return. During his tenure with the Rockets, Hightower opened a men's clothing store and a restaurant in Denver.

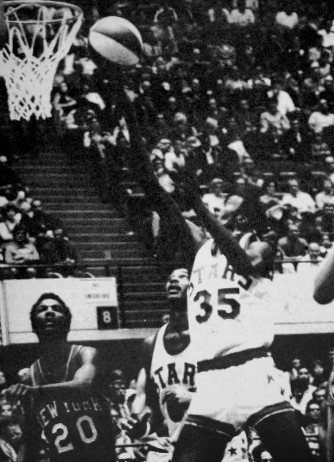
Hightower (#35) as a member of the Utah Stars shooting a layup in a game against the New York Nets on October 29, 1970.

In September 1969, the Rockets traded Hightower along with center Bill McGill to the Los Angeles Stars for cash considerations. Hightower was sidelined early in the season with a wrist injury he suffered off the court. On December 16, 1969, in the last three minutes and thirty seconds of regulation, Hightower scored nine of the Stars' last 11 points to help his team come from behind to defeat the Kentucky Colonels, 102–101. Hightower got off to a hot start to the 1969–70 season, but he suffered a back injury and was placed of the injured reserve on January 14. He played just 27 games and averaged a career-best 18.1 points per game, 9.4 rebounds and 2.6 assists. Hightower's injury kept him out through the 1970 ABA Playoffs. The Stars made it to the ABA Finals, but fell to the Indiana Pacers (2–4).

The ABA formally recognized the American Basketball Players Association, a labor union that represented league players, in July 1970. Hightower was elected the organization's first vice president after it gained recognition. Hightower scored a season high 34 points and 8 assists during the Stars victory over the Indiana Pacers on October 24, 1970. He played the entire game, 48 minutes, and grabbed 11 rebounds. On November 24, 1970, Hightower set a team record for free throws and free throws attempted with 16 and 19, respectively, in a game against the Denver Rockets. He suffered an eye injury during a game against the Pacers on November 8, 1970, that sidelined him for two subsequent games. On January 7, 1971, the Utah Stars traded Hightower and Donnie Freeman to the Texas Chaparrals in exchange for Glen Combs and Ron Boone. In his first game for Texas on January 8, Hightower scored 24 points (12 of which came from the free throw line) in a losing effort to his former team, the Utah Stars. In March, Hightower was diagnosed with a blood clot in his leg that forced him out of action. He played a total of 68 games between Utah and Texas during the 1970–71 season. He averaged 13.9 points per game with 5.8 rebounds and 2.9 assists.

Following the 1970–71 season, Texas waived Hightower, who was quickly claimed by the Denver Rockets. The Chaparrals rescinded the waivers and his contract was returned to them. Hightower was then traded by the Chaparrals to the Carolina Cougars on July 21, 1971, in exchange for cash considerations. He played in only 13 games during the 1971–72 season, a career low. He scored a season high 13 points twice during the season (on October 29 and November 2, 1971). He finished the season with averaging 5.6 points per game, 3.3 rebounds and 0.8 rebounds in 10.8 minutes. Following the 1971–72 campaign, the Cougars sold Hightower in the Denver Rockets in a cash deal. However, Rockets coach Alex Hannum voided the deal after Hightower was late reporting to Denver's preseason training camp. His contract was returned to the Cougars as Denver refused to send the agreed upon money.

== Later life and death ==
In 1973, Hightower sued the American Basketball Association (ABA) and the Carolina Cougars for $573,000 (equivalent to $4,155,753 in 2025) for backed salary in the form of unpaid living expenses and fines. He also claimed damages, alleging the Cougars prevented him from signing with any other ABA teams. The parties settled for $3,000 (equivalent to $19,585 in 2025) in October 1974. Hightower had hoped to transition into coaching after he retired from playing, but received no offers.

Following the retirement from professional basketball, Hightower joined the Peace Corps and traveled to Tunisia — where he coached basketball. Hightower later became an ordained minister and coached basketball at the West Philadelphia Boys Club. He was employed as an interior designer. When asked about his life and basketball career by Philadelphia Daily News writer Elmer Smith, Hightower responded, "There are a lot of things I could be bitter about. But is being bitter going to solve anything? [...] You may ask me why I'm not rich, but I don't go into that side of it. What I earned as a professional is personal. After my second contract, I never talked about it again. Sometimes I think I haven't got as much of the game as I put into it. But that's OK.

By 1988, Hightower estimated he suffered three or four heart attacks. Hightower died from a heart attack on April 18, 2002, in his hometown of Philadelphia, aged 62. At the time of his death, he was living with his mother in the same house in which she raised him.

== Legacy and playing style ==
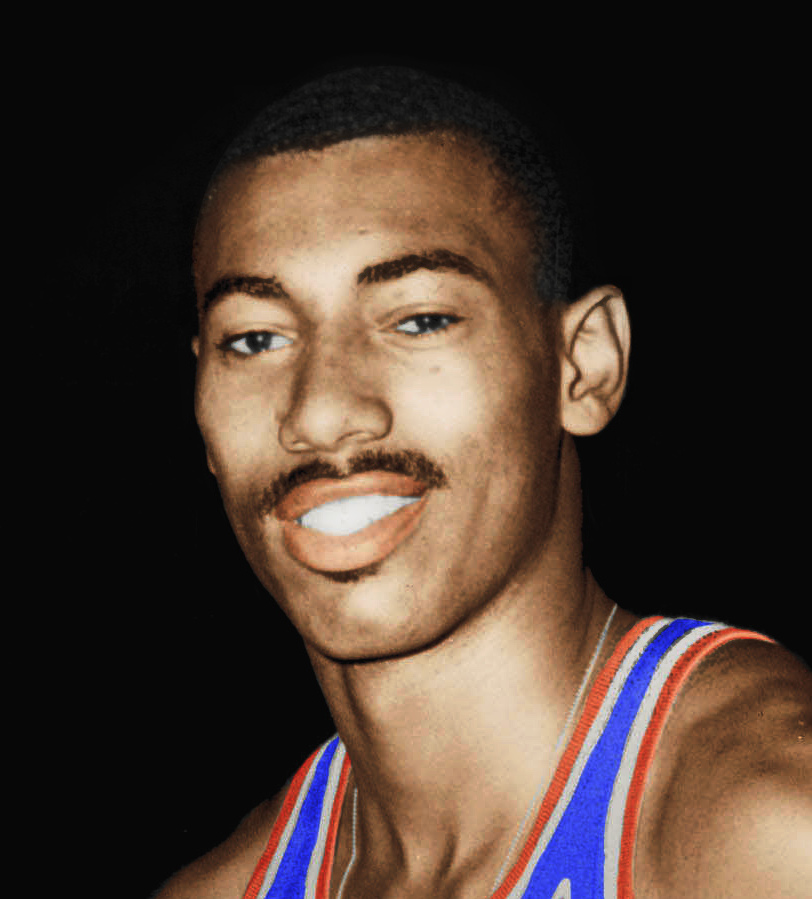
In high school, Hightower was regularly compared to Wilt Chamberlain. There were a number of biographical similarities between Hightower and Chamberlain, in spite of their differences in playing styles.

During his time at Overbrook High School, Hightower was compared to Wilt Chamberlain on a number of occasions. Both men were born in Philadelphia and played center for Overbrook. Both men led Overbrook to two championships (Chamberlain: 1954–55, 1955–56; Hightower: 1956–57, 1957–58). Later the biographical parallels continued, as Hightower followed Chamberlain to the University of Kansas. While Hightower was in college, the press began noting that the two players had different playing styles. The Kansas City Star reporter Bill Richardson wrote that there may have been undue pressure on Hightower to live up to Chamberlain's success. The similarities between the two men persisted, as Hightower left college in 1961 with one-year of eligibility left to pursue professional basketball, just like Chamberlain had done in 1958. After almost joining the Globetrotters, which is what Chamberlain did after leaving college, Hightower signed with the Spanish basketball team Real Madrid. After waiting out his one-year of college eligibility (to be drafted in the NBA at the time a player had to graduate or wait out their full college eligibility) Hightower was drafted by the Warriors — the same team that drafted Chamberlain in 1959. The two men even had to wear protective face masks at the same time due to facial injuries they sustained during the 1964–65 season.

Hightower's jump from the NBA to the ABA in 1967 lent credibility to the new league. Denver Rockets head coach and general manager Bob Bass said of the team's first season, "The most important thing we did was sign Wayne Hightower." On Hightower, ABA public relations director Lee Meade said, "It was still a big deal when he signed with Denver [...] I mean, at least the hard-core fans had heard of him."

Hightower said the reason he jumped leagues is because the management for the Detroit Pistons publicly stated they were not interested in offering him a contract for the 1967–68 season. He told the United Press International in September 1967, "As far as I'm concerned I have no obligation to Detroit. If someone tells you that you don't fit into their future plans, the best thing you can do is seek other employment. That is precisely what I did." The open question was whether or not the Pistons would take legal action against the Rockets to stop them from using Hightower during the upcoming season. A legal case involving Rick Barry, who jumped from the NBA's San Francisco Warriors to the ABA's Oakland Oaks, upheld the NBA's reserve clause and prevented Barry from playing in the ABA during the 1967–68 season. Ultimately Hightower did accept Detroit's non-guaranteed contract and reported to their training camp. He was waived before the start of the season and became a free agent. He re-signed with Denver and played for them for two seasons.

As a player, Hightower was not a high percentage shooter. His speed and defense were considered the strongest parts of his game. Billings Gazette sports editor Norm Clarke called Hightower "one of the best defensive performers in the ABA". Hightower was named to the 1969 ABA All-Star Game as a coaches selection. Western Division head coach Alex Hannum told the Associated Press, "The writers and broadcasters go with the glamor boys. There's nothing wrong with that, but I added Hightower to help us win the game. [...] He has a great ability to play defense. He is big enough to guard a big man and still agile enough to handle a good size guard." Hightower's head coach with the Utah Stars, Bill Sharman, praised Hightower's ability to the Deseret News in 1970. He told the publication, "[Hightower] can play anywhere with his speed and I'm not scared to use him as a guard on defense. I can even use him sometimes as a relief for Zelmo Beaty at center and he can also bring the ball down with another guard."

Throughout his NBA and ABA career, Hightower was nicknamed "Spain", which referred to his stint with Real Madrid. In 1968, Real Madrid head coach Pedro Ferrándiz said Hightower was his team's greatest all-time player. Ferrándiz said that if Hightower had stayed with his team, he would have been one of the greatest all-time players in Spanish basketball. In 2019, Real Madrid president Florentino Pérez called Hightower "legendary". During the NBA's 50^{th} anniversary in 1997, the Golden State Warriors honored Hightower as one of their "50 years, 50 stars" members, their take on the 50 Greatest Players in NBA History. Hightower's tall and slender frame was described as "stringbean-ish" by Detroit Free Press writer Jack Saylor.

== Personal life ==
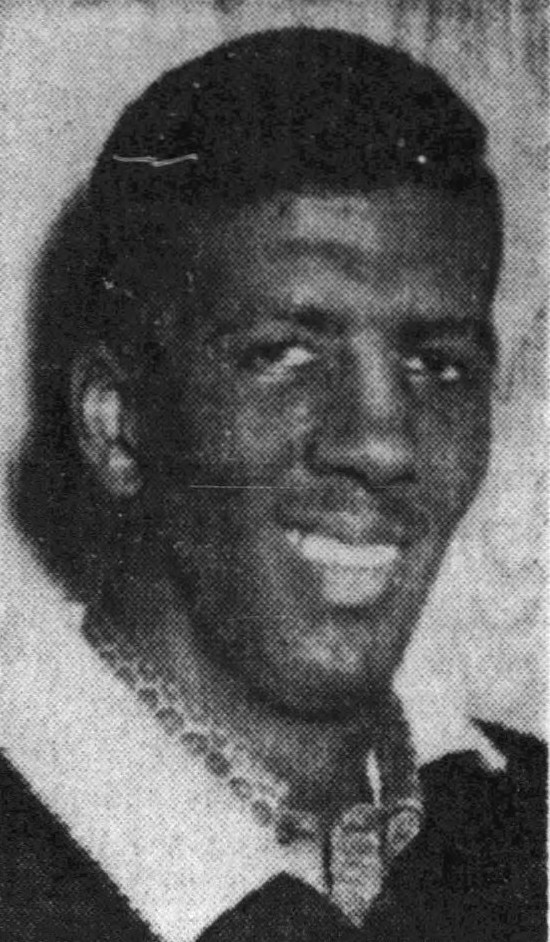
Hightower, circa 1961

Hightower was born on January 14, 1940, in Philadelphia, Pennsylvania, to Earnest and Ruth Hightower. Wayne's younger brother, Drake, played basketball at Overbrook High School and was offered an athletic scholarship to Tennessee State University. He played for the school's basketball team, but dropped out of college to manage a lounge owned by Wayne in Denver, Colorado, called the Bunny Club. Wayne Hightower was interested in men's fashion. During his college years, he was known around the University of Kansas campus as a sharp dresser. His interest led him to open a men's clothing store in Denver when he was playing for the Denver Rockets in the late 1960s.

Throughout his life, Hightower suffered from depression and what he described as "nervous breakdowns". In August 1964, Hightower was hospitalized for multiple lacerations after his car collided with a city bus in San Francisco, California.

San Francisco based Golden Gate National Bank filed suit against Hightower for $2,502.72 (equivalent to $25,569 in 2025) in unpaid promissory notes in April 1965. In September 1965, Hightower declared bankruptcy, listing his just $255 (equivalent to $2,605 in 2025) in assets and $51,476 (equivalent to $525,903 in 2025) in debts. His salary during the previous season was $12,500 (equivalent to $127,706 in 2025). At the top of the list of debts were three cars Hightower purchased for $9,800. His other debts included unpaid hotel bills, hospital bills, car rentals, legal fees, retail bills and financial institutions. During his time with the Baltimore Bullets, Hightower was cited by the City of Baltimore for 26 parking violations, all of which were unpaid when he was traded to the Detroit Pistons in 1967.

During his time in Baltimore, Hightower served as a field representative for Big Brothers of America. In 1968, Hightower endorsed the non-partisan political advocacy group, Peaceful Resources in Democratic Education (PRIDE), which lobbied for the inclusion of African American history in public school curriculum. The group also advocated for African studies programs and departments at the university level. He appeared on Pride!, a television show that aired on KUED in November 1970. During the broadcast, Hightower stated he is pleased with the response from fans to himself and the Utah Stars.

== Career statistics ==
Legend
GP	Games played	GS	Games started	MPG	Minutes per game
FG%	Field goal percentage	3P%	3-point field goal percentage	FT%	Free throw percentage
RPG	Rebounds per game	APG	Assists per game	SPG	Steals per game
BPG	Blocks per game	PPG	Points per game	**Bold**	Career high

=== College ===
Year	Team	GP	GS	MPG	FG%	3P%	FT%	RPG	APG	SPG	BPG	PPG
1958–59	Kansas (Freshman)^{[a]}	–	–	–	–	–	–	–	–	–	–	25.7
1959–60	Kansas	**28**	–	–	**.408**	–	**.677**	10.1	–	–	–	**21.8**
1960–61	Kansas	25	–	–	.399	–	.668	**11.6**	–	–	–	20.7
Career		53	–	–	.404	–	.674	10.8	–	–	–	21.3

=== ABA and NBA regular season ===
Year	Team	GP	GS	MPG	FG%	3P%	FT%	RPG	APG	SPG	BPG	PPG
1962–63	San Francisco	66	–	21.0	.350	–	.669	5.4	0.8	–	–	7.4
1963–64	San Francisco	**79**	–	32.1	.385	–	.790	7.2	1.7	–	–	13.2
1964–65	San Francisco	48	–	21.6	.343	–	.769	5.1	0.8	–	–	8.4
1964–65	Baltimore	27	–	18.9	.345	–	.765	6.4	0.6	–	–	6.7
1965–66	Baltimore	24	–	19.2	.339	–	.731	5.5	1.5	–	–	7.6
1966–67	Baltimore	43	–	17.3	.334	–	.718	5.6	0.8	–	–	6.9
1966–67	Detroit	29	–	19.4	.355	–	.744	5.7	1.0	–	–	8.6
1967–68	Denver (ABA)	74	–	33.2	.383	.000	.773	7.2	1.9	–	–	17.3
1968–69	Denver (ABA)	67	–	34.6	.408	.000	.730	9.6	**3.0**	–	–	13.9
1969–70	Los Angeles (ABA)	27	–	35.6	**.447**	.000	.759	9.4	2.6	–	–	**18.1**
1970–71	Utah (ABA)	35	–	32.4	.391	.000	.749	8.2	**3.0**	–	–	13.4
1970–71	Texas (ABA)	33	–	**37.0**	.409	.000	.736	**9.9**	2.7	–	–	14.5
1971–72	Carolina (ABA)	13	–	10.8	.313	.000	**.833**	3.3	0.8	–	–	5.4
Career		565	–	27.4	.381	–	.752	7.0	1.7	–	–	11.6
All-Star		1	0	9.0	.500	–	1.000	5.0	0.0	–	–	6.0

=== ABA and NBA playoffs ===
Year	Team	GP	GS	MPG	FG%	3P%	FT%	RPG	APG	SPG	BPG	PPG
1964	San Francisco	**12**	–	23.8	.259	–	.697	4.2	1.5	–	–	6.8
1965	Baltimore	10	–	19.6	**.422**	–	.636	5.5	1.5	–	–	6.8
1968	Denver (ABA)	5	–	**41.8**	.350	.000	**.796**	**8.8**	2.2	–	–	**22.6**
1969	Denver (ABA)	7	–	26.7	.397	–	.796	6.7	1.7	–	–	12.0
1971	Texas (ABA)	4	–	31.5	.324	–	.765	8.0	**2.8**	–	–	8.8
Career		38	–	34.0	.340	–	.743	6.1	1.6	–	–	10.0

== Footnotes ==
^a At the time, rules barred freshman from playing on their school's varsity teams. Statistics from freshman teams are not in the official NCAA records.
