= 1971–72 Dallas Chaparrals season =

ABA basketball team season

- Head coach: Tom Nissalke
- Arena: Moody Coliseum; Dallas Memorial Auditorium

Results
- Record: 42–42 (.500)
- Place: Division: 3rd (Western)
- Playoff finish: Division Semifinals (lost to the Stars 0–4)

The 1971–72 Dallas Chaparrals season was the fifth season of the Chaparrals franchise in the American Basketball Association. This season saw them return to their original name of the Dallas Chaparrals that they had for their first three seasons of existence to just represent the city of Dallas after they had originally played their previous season under the short-lived Texas Chaparrals name in what turned out to be a failed experiment for the Chaparrals franchise to exist as a regional franchise for the entire state of Texas (trying to work similarly to the Carolina Cougars, Virginia Squires, and "The Floridians" franchises for the states of North Carolina, Virginia, and Florida, respectively). For their third straight season in a row, the Chaps lost to the Utah Stars in the Western Division Semifinals, being swept by the Stars once again after previously being swept by Utah while representing the entire state of Texas instead of just the city of Dallas. This later turned out to be the final playoff appearance for the team for their time out in Dallas, as one season after that happened (which also became the only season they would miss the ABA Playoffs altogether while playing in the ABA), the Chaparrals would move to San Antonio to become the San Antonio Spurs in the 1973–74 ABA season and continue to exist under that name to this day.

== ABA Draft ==
This draft was the first ABA draft to have a properly recorded historical note of every round in their draft available.

Round	Pick	Player	Position(s)	Nationality	College
1	9	Stan Love	PF	United States	Oregon
2	11	Sidney Wicks	PF	United States	UCLA
2	20	Roger Brown	C	United States	Kansas
3	28	Walt Szczerbiak	SF	United States; West Germany	George Washington
4	33	Gene Phillips	SG	United States	Southern Methodist
5	44	Collis Jones	SF/PF	United States	Notre Dame
6	55	George Trapp	PF/C	United States	Cal State Long Beach College
7	66	Sterling Quant	PF	The Bahamas	Central State
8	77	Curtis Rowe	PF	United States	UCLA
9	88	Jimmie Guymon	G	United States	Eastern New Mexico
10	99	Gene Knoll	G	United States	Texas Tech
11	110	Al Shumate	SF	United States	North Texas State University
12	120	Willie Hart	C	United States	Grambling College
13	130	Goo Kennedy	PF	United States	Texas Christian University
14	139	Bill Brickhouse	G	United States	Montana State
15	148	William Chatmon	F	United States	Baylor
16	157	Harry Taylor	SG/SF	United States	Los Angeles Baptist
17	165	Dan McGhee	PF/C	United States	Howard Payne College

This draft would become the only ABA draft the Chaparrals would officially participate in as the Texas Chaparrals instead of their usual Dallas Chaparrals name. This draft would have also had them hold the #1 pick in that year's draft (which became ABA All-Star power forward/center Jim McDaniels from Western Kentucky University) due to them having the worst record by the time the draft first began (which officially started on January 22 and then concluded properly on March 15, 1971) had they not swapped around first round draft picks alongside various other players with the team that eventually won the 1971 ABA Finals Championship by the end of the season, the Utah Stars. The Chaparrals would also gain a second round pick from the Utah Stars through a different trade they did during the season.

== Roster ==
1971–72 Dallas Chaparrals roster
Players

Pos.	No.	Player	Height	Weight	DOB	From
PF	44	John Beasley	6 ft 9 in (2.06 m)	225 lb (102 kg)	February 5, 1944	Texas A&M
PF	40	Len Chappell	6 ft 8 in (2.03 m)	240 lb (109 kg)	January 31, 1941	Wake Forest
PG	4, 21	Jeff Congdon	6 ft 1 in (1.85 m)	180 lb (82 kg)	October 17, 1943	BYU
SG	20	Donnie Freeman	6 ft 3 in (1.91 m)	185 lb (84 kg)	July 18, 1944	Illinois
SF	15	Shaler Halimon	6 ft 5 in (1.96 m)	199 lb (90 kg)	March 30, 1945	Utah State
PG	11	Joe Hamilton	5 ft 10 in (1.78 m)	160 lb (73 kg)	July 5, 1948	North Texas
SF	54	Simmie Hill	6 ft 7 in (2.01 m)	233 lb (106 kg)	November 14, 1946	West Texas A&M
C	25	George E. Johnson	6 ft 11 in (2.11 m)	245 lb (111 kg)	June 19, 1947	Stephen F. Austin
PF	43	Collis Jones	6 ft 7 in (2.01 m)	203 lb (92 kg)	July 3, 1949	Notre Dame
SF	33	Rich Jones	6 ft 6 in (1.98 m)	220 lb (100 kg)	December 27, 1946	Memphis
SG	23	Steve Jones	6 ft 5 in (1.96 m)	205 lb (93 kg)	October 17, 1942	Oregon
PF	50	Goo Kennedy	6 ft 5 in (1.96 m)	205 lb (93 kg)	August 23, 1949	TCU
C	55	Gene Moore	6 ft 9 in (2.06 m)	225 lb (102 kg)	July 29, 1945	Saint Louis
C	52	Rich Niemann	7 ft 0 in (2.13 m)	245 lb (111 kg)	July 2, 1946	Saint Louis
C	15	George Peeples	6 ft 7 in (2.01 m)	190 lb (86 kg)	October 30, 1943	Iowa
G	13	Gene Phillips	6 ft 4 in (1.93 m)	175 lb (79 kg)	October 25, 1948	SMU
SF		Bob Quick	6 ft 5 in (1.96 m)	215 lb (98 kg)	March 5, 1946	Xavier
F	15	Ron Sanford	6 ft 9 in (2.06 m)	215 lb (98 kg)	June 11, 1946	New Mexico

Coaches
Head coach
- Tom Nissalke

Legend
- (DP) Unsigned draft pick
- (FA) Free agent
- (S) Suspended
- Injured

== Final standings ==
=== Western Division ===
Team	W	L	%	GB
Utah Stars	60	24	.714	-
Indiana Pacers	47	37	.560	13
Dallas Chaparrals	42	42	.500	18
Denver Rockets	34	50	.405	26
Memphis Pros	26	58	.310	34

== ABA Playoffs ==
1972 playoff game log
ABA Western Division Semifinals: 0–4 (home: 0–2; road: 0–2)

Game	Date	Team	Score	High points	High rebounds	High assists	Location Attendance	Series
1	April 1	@ Utah	L 96–106	Steve "Snapper" Jones (22)	George Johnson (11)	George Johnson (5)	Salt Palace; 8,783	0–1
2	April 3	@ Utah	L 107–113	Donnie Freeman (36)	Collis Jones (12)	Joe Hamilton (5)	Salt Palace; 9,121	0–2
3	April 5	Utah	L 89–96	Donnie Freeman (21)	Rich Jones (12)	Rich Jones (5)	Moody Coliseum; 4,076	0–3
4	April 7	Utah	L 99–103	Donnie Freeman (30)	S. Jones, R. Jones (7)	Joe Hamilton (5)	Moody Coliseum; 3,918	0–4

1972 schedule

== Awards and honors ==
1972 ABA All-Star Game selections (game played on January 29, 1972)

- Donnie Freeman
- Steve Jones
