= Tom Workman (basketball) =

American basketball player

Personal information
- Born: November 14, 1944 (age 82) Seattle, Washington, U.S.
- Listed height: 6 ft 7 in (2.01 m)
- Listed weight: 218 lb (99 kg)

Career information
- High school: Bishop Blanchet (Seattle, Washington)
- College: Seattle (1964–1967)
- NBA draft: 1967: 1st round, 8th overall pick
- Drafted by: St. Louis Hawks
- Playing career: 1967–1971
- Position: Power forward
- Number: 12, 41, 40, 22, 55, 23, 22, 30

Career history
- 1967–1968: St. Louis Hawks
- 1968–1969: Baltimore Bullets
- 1969: Detroit Pistons
- 1969–1970: Los Angeles/Utah Stars
- 1970–1971: Denver Rockets

Career highlights
- No. 32 retired by Seattle Redhawks
- Stats at NBA.com
- Stats at Basketball Reference

Thomas Edwin Workman (born November 14, 1944) is an American former professional basketball player. He played in both the National Basketball Association (NBA) and American Basketball Association (ABA) between 1967 and 1971.

During his college career at Seattle University from 1964 to 1967, Workman scored 1,497 points. He holds career averages of 19.2 points and 8.4 rebounds per game in his three seasons. During his sophomore season in 1965–66, Workman played a large role in Seattle upsetting Texas Western, 74–72, as their only loss of a national championship-winning season. He was selected in the 1967 NBA draft as the eighth overall pick by the St. Louis Hawks.

== Career statistics ==
Legend
GP	Games played	GS	Games started	MPG	Minutes per game
FG%	Field goal percentage	3P%	3-point field goal percentage	FT%	Free throw percentage
RPG	Rebounds per game	APG	Assists per game	SPG	Steals per game
BPG	Blocks per game	PPG	Points per game	**Bold**	Career high

=== NBA/ABA ===
==== Regular season ====
Year	Team	GP	MPG	FG%	3P%	FT%	RPG	APG	PPG
1967–68	St. Louis	19	4.5	**.500**		.773	1.3	.2	2.9
1967–68	Baltimore	1	10.0	.000		**1.000**	1.0	.0	1.0
1968–69	Baltimore	21	4.1	.407		.600	1.3	.1	2.5
1969–70	L.A. Stars (ABA)	26	**17.1**	.462	**.250**	.786	**3.6**	.8	**11.9**
1969–70	Detroit	2	3.0	.000		–	.0	.0	.0
1970–71	Utah (ABA)	17	11.2	.423	**.250**	.784	2.7	.6	7.0
1970–71	Denver (ABA)	**39**	12.5	.447	.091	.838	3.4	**.9**	6.1
Career (NBA)		43	4.3	.432		.711	1.2	.1	2.5
Career (ABA)		82	13.7	.449	.174	.803	3.3	.9	8.1
Career (overall)		125	10.5	.447	.174	.788	2.6	.6	6.2

==== Playoffs ====
Year	Team	GP	MPG	FG%	3P%	FT%	RPG	APG	PPG
1969	Baltimore	1	2.0	.000		–	**1.0**	.0	.0
1970	L.A. Stars (ABA)	**3**	**3.0**	**.429**	–	–	**1.0**	.0	**2.0**
Career		4	2.8	.375	–	–	1.0	.0	1.5
