= 1971–72 Utah Stars season =

ABA professional basketball team season

- Division champions
- Head coach: LaDell Andersen
- Arena: Salt Palace

Results
- Record: 60–24 (.714)
- Place: Division: 1st (ABA)
- Playoff finish: Lost in Division Finals

The 1971–72 Utah Stars season was the second season of the Stars out in the state of Utah and fifth overall in the American Basketball Association when including their previous seasons they played in the nearby state of California when including their time spent as the Anaheim Amigos and Los Angeles Stars. Entering this season, the Stars were the defending champions of the entire ABA after making a successful move from the city of Los Angeles to the state of Utah out in Salt Lake City. The Stars would go 31–11 during the first half of the season, while finishing the second half of the season with a 29–13 record, which included a ten-game winning streak near the end of the season. Their biggest losing streak would be three games long, which happened four different times during the season. They finished third in points scored at 117.8 per game and fourth in points allowed at 112.0 per game. While Utah didn't finish with the best overall record this season (the Kentucky Colonels would actually obtain the best record in ABA history during this same season), they would still easily win the Western Division by over ten games this season. The Stars then swept the Dallas Chaparrals in the Western Division Semifinals, but lost to the Indiana Pacers in seven games in what became their second straight rematch in a row after the Stars lost the 1969 ABA Finals while playing in Los Angeles as the #4 seed there and then beat the Pacers during their first season in Utah, denying them a repeat ABA Finals appearance and a shot at another championship afterward.

== ABA Draft ==
This draft was the first ABA draft to have a properly recorded historical note of every round in their draft available.

Round	Pick	Player	Position(s)	Nationality	College
1	1	Jim McDaniels	PF/C	United States	Western Kentucky
2	21	Garry Nelson	C	United States	Duquesne
3	31	Rick Fisher	PF	United States	Colorado State
4	43	Mo Layton	PG	United States	USC
5	54	Lee Dedmon	PF	United States	North Carolina
6	65	Bobby Fields	G	United States	La Salle College
7	76	Erwin Johnson	F	United States	Augusta College
8	87	Jim Day	F	United States	Morehead State
9	98	Willie Humes	G	United States	Idaho State
10	109	Jake Jones	SG	United States	Assumption College

The Utah Stars would surprisingly obtain the #1 pick of the 1971 ABA draft by swapping first round picks alongside multiple players around with the Texas Chaparrals (as they were known at the time) before the draft began, with Texas just so happening to have the worst record of the ABA by January 22, 1971 (the start of this specific ABA draft) to have the Stars acquiring Jim McDaniels from Western Kentucky University, though McDaniels would never play for Utah despite them being defending ABA champions this season. This draft is also interesting for them being the only team to not use any more of their draft picks after the tenth round came and went, especially since they decided not to bother using the second half of the draft from the eleventh round onward.

== Roster ==
1971–72 Utah Stars roster
Players

Pos.	No.	Player	Height	Weight	DOB	From
PF	44	John Beasley	6 ft 9 in (2.06 m)	225 lb (102 kg)	February 5, 1944	Texas A&M
C	31	Zelmo Beaty	6 ft 9 in (2.06 m)	225 lb (102 kg)	October 25, 1939	Prairie View A&M
SG	24	Ron Boone	6 ft 2 in (1.88 m)	200 lb (91 kg)	September 6, 1946	Idaho State
SG	12	Mike Butler	6 ft 2 in (1.88 m)	170 lb (77 kg)	October 22, 1946	Memphis
SG	40	Glen Combs	6 ft 2 in (1.88 m)	185 lb (84 kg)	October 30, 1946	Virginia Tech
G	23	Bobby Fields	6 ft 3 in (1.91 m)	175 lb (79 kg)	October 20, 1949	La Salle
F	22	Rick Fisher	6 ft 5 in (1.96 m)	215 lb (98 kg)	October 27, 1948	Colorado State
C	33	Ira Harge	6 ft 9 in (2.06 m)	225 lb (102 kg)	March 14, 1941	New Mexico
PG	10	Mervin Jackson	6 ft 3 in (1.91 m)	175 lb (79 kg)	August 15, 1946	Utah
PG	15	Jimmy Jones	6 ft 4 in (1.93 m)	188 lb (85 kg)	January 1, 1945	Grambling State
C	35	Manny Leaks	6 ft 8 in (2.03 m)	225 lb (102 kg)	1945-11-27	Niagara
SF	14	Roderick McDonald	6 ft 6 in (1.98 m)	205 lb (93 kg)	April 9, 1945	Whitworth
PF	21	Red Robbins	6 ft 8 in (2.03 m)	190 lb (86 kg)	September 30, 1944	Tennessee
SF	33	George Stone	6 ft 7 in (2.01 m)	195 lb (88 kg)	February 9, 1946	Marshall
SF	42	Willie Wise	6 ft 5 in (1.96 m)	210 lb (95 kg)	March 3, 1947	Drake

Coaches
Head coach
- LaDell Andersen
Assistant(s)
- Larry Creger

Legend
- (DP) Unsigned draft pick
- (FA) Free agent
- (S) Suspended
- Injured

Roster

== Final standings ==
=== Western Division ===
Team	W	L	%	GB
Utah Stars	60	24	.714	-
Indiana Pacers	47	37	.560	13
Dallas Chaparrals	42	42	.500	18
Denver Rockets	34	50	.405	26
Memphis Pros	26	58	.310	34

== ABA Playoffs ==
ABA Western Division Semifinals vs. Dallas Chaparrals

Game	Date	Location	Score	Record	Attendance
1	April 1	Utah	106–96	1–0	8,783
2	April 3	Utah	113–107	2–0	9,121
3	April 5	Dallas	96–89	3–0	4,076
4	April 7	Dallas	103–99	4–0	3,918

Stars win series 4–0

ABA Western Division Finals vs. Indiana Pacers

Game	Date	Location	Result	Record	Attendance
1	April 15	Utah	108–100	1–0	9,854
2	April 17	Utah	117–109	2–0	11,780
3	April 19	Indiana	111–116	2–1	7,489
4	April 22	Indiana	108–118	2–2	13,007
5	April 24	Utah	139–130	3–2	12,526
6	April 26	Indiana	99–105	3–3	8,103
7	May 1	Utah	113–117	3–4	12,724

Stars lose series, 4–3

== Awards and honors ==
1972 ABA All-Star Game selections (game played on January 29, 1972)

- Willie Wise
- Zelmo Beaty
- Glen Combs
- All-ABA Second Team selections: Willie Wise and Zelmo Beaty.
