= 1970–71 Utah Stars season =

- ABA champions
- Head coach: Bill Sharman
- Arena: Salt Palace

Results
- Record: 57–27 (.679)
- Place: Division: 2nd
- Playoff finish: Won ABA Championship

Local media
- Television: KUTV 2
- Radio: KALL

The 1970–71 Utah Stars season was the first season for the Stars in the state of Utah. After their inaugural season played in the city of Anaheim as the Amigos and two seasons in Los Angeles (both cities being in the large state of California), the Stars moved to the nearby state of Utah in June 1970 following a near-upset run in the 1970 ABA Finals against the Indiana Pacers and reneging on an initial plan on moving to Albuquerque, New Mexico to go to Utah over an alternative idea of returning to Anaheim (potentially with the Amigos name returning there). The Stars finished second in the Western Division behind only the defending champion Indiana Pacers by one game, but won their first and only ABA title during this season. In the Western Division Semifinals, the Stars swept the Texas Chaparrals (who would only be named the Texas Chaparrals for this season before aborting the idea of playing as a regional franchise within the state of Texas to become the Dallas Chaparrals within the city of Dallas like they were before this season and would stay that way for the next two seasons of theirs before later becoming the San Antonio Spurs going forward) in four games. In the Western Division Finals, they beat the Indiana Pacers in seven games (including Game 7 that was played in the state of Indiana) to advance to the ABA Finals. Then in seven games, they beat the Kentucky Colonels in the 1971 ABA Finals, in order to give the state of Utah its first professional championship (and as of 2025, their only professional championship in the sport of basketball).

== Roster ==
1970–71 Utah Stars roster
Players

Pos.	No.	Player	Height	Weight	DOB	From
C	31	Zelmo Beaty	6 ft 9 in (2.06 m)	225 lb (102 kg)	October 25, 1939	Prairie View A&M
SG	24	Ron Boone	6 ft 2 in (1.88 m)	200 lb (91 kg)	September 6, 1946	Idaho State
SG	12	Mike Butler	6 ft 2 in (1.88 m)	170 lb (77 kg)	October 22, 1946	Memphis
SG	40	Glen Combs	6 ft 2 in (1.88 m)	185 lb (84 kg)	October 30, 1946	Virginia Tech
PG	23	Jeff Congdon	6 ft 1 in (1.85 m)	180 lb (82 kg)	October 17, 1943	BYU
SG	20	Donnie Freeman	6 ft 3 in (1.91 m)	185 lb (84 kg)	July 18, 1944	Illinois
PF	35	Wayne Hightower	6 ft 8 in (2.03 m)	192 lb (87 kg)	January 14, 1940	Kansas
PG	10	Mervin Jackson	6 ft 3 in (1.91 m)	175 lb (79 kg)	August 15, 1946	Utah
PF	14	Roderick McDonald	6 ft 6 in (1.98 m)	205 lb (93 kg)	April 9, 1945	Whitworth
SG	11	Dick Nemelka	6 ft 0 in (1.83 m)	175 lb (79 kg)	October 1, 1943	BYU
PF	21	Red Robbins	6 ft 8 in (2.03 m)	190 lb (86 kg)	September 30, 1944	Tennessee
SF	54	Sam Smith	6 ft 7 in (2.01 m)	230 lb (104 kg)	January 27, 1944	Louisville
SF	33	George Stone	6 ft 7 in (2.01 m)	195 lb (88 kg)	February 9, 1946	Marshall
SF	42	Willie Wise	6 ft 5 in (1.96 m)	210 lb (95 kg)	March 3, 1947	Drake
F/C	22	Tom Workman	6 ft 7 in (2.01 m)	218 lb (99 kg)	November 14, 1944	Seattle

Coaches
Head coach
- Bill Sharman
Assistant(s)
- Larry Creger

Legend
- (DP) Unsigned draft pick
- (FA) Free agent
- (S) Suspended
- Injured

Roster

== Season standings ==
Team	W	L	PCT.	GB
Indiana Pacers	58	26	.690	
Utah Stars	57	27	.679	1
Memphis Pros	41	43	.488	17
Texas Chaparrals	30	54	.357	28
Denver Rockets	30	54	.357	28

== ABA Playoffs ==
ABA Western Division Semifinals

Game	Date	Location	Score	Record	Attendance
1	April 2	Utah	125–115	1–0	4,375
2	April 3	Utah	137–107	2–0	6,061
3	April 4	Texas	113–101	3–0	4,674
4	April 6	Texas	128–107	4–0	3,666

Stars win series, 4–0

ABA Division Finals

Game	Date	Location	Score	Record	Attendance
1	April 12	Indiana	120–118	1–0	7,734
2	April 14	Indiana	107–120	1–1	9,458
3	April 17	Utah	121–107	2–1	12,711
4	April 20	Utah	126–99	3–1	12,761
5	April 22	Indiana	109–127	3–2	8,279
6	April 24	Utah	102–105	3–3	13,208
7	April 28	Indiana	108–101	4–3	11,202

Stars win series, 4–3

ABA Finals

Game	Date	Location	Score	Record	Attendance
1	May 3	Utah	136–117	1–0	12,051
2	May 5	Utah	138–125	2–0	13,208
3	May 7	Kentucky	110–116	2–1	12,337
4	April 8	Kentucky	125–129 (OT)	2–2	9,863
5	May 12	Utah	137–127	3–2	13,260
6	May 15	Kentucky	102–105	3–3	11,793
7	May 18	Utah	131–121	4–3	13,260

Stars win championship series, 4–3

Zelmo Beaty scored 23.2 points per game and rebounded 14.6 rebounds per game, which earned him the Playoffs MVP.

== Awards, records, and honors ==
- 1971 ABA All-Star Game
  - Zelmo Beaty
  - Glen Combs
  - Red Robbins
  - Ron Boone
