= Rich Jones (basketball) =

American basketball player (born 1946)

Personal information
- Born: December 27, 1946 (age 79) Memphis, Tennessee, U.S.
- Listed height: 6 ft 6 in (1.98 m)
- Listed weight: 220 lb (100 kg)

Career information
- High school: Lester (Memphis, Tennessee)
- College: Illinois (1965–1967); Memphis (1968–1969)
- NBA draft: 1969: 5th round, 58th overall pick
- Drafted by: Phoenix Suns
- Playing career: 1969–1977
- Position: Power forward / center
- Number: 33

Career history
- 1969–1970: Pallacanestro Varese
- 1970–1973: Dallas / Texas Chaparrals
- 1973–1975: San Antonio Spurs
- 1975–1977: New York Nets

Career highlights
- European Champions Cup winner (1969-1970); ABA champion (1976); 2× ABA All-Star (1973, 1974); Second-team Parade All-American (1964)

Career ABA and NBA statistics
- Points: 7,922 (15.6 ppg)
- Rebounds: 3,759 (7.4 rpg)
- Assists: 1,394 (2.7 apg)
- Stats at NBA.com
- Stats at Basketball Reference

Richard Wesley "House" Jones (born December 27, 1946) is a retired American professional basketball player.

A 6'6" forward from the University of Memphis, Jones played parts of seven seasons (1970–1976) in the American Basketball Association as a member of the Dallas/Texas Chaparrals, the San Antonio Spurs, and the New York Nets. He won an ABA Championship with the Nets in 1976 and appeared in two ABA All-Star Games.

Jones also played one season for the Nets in the National Basketball Association after the ABA–NBA merger in 1976. In his ABA/NBA career, he averaged 15.6 points per game and 7.4 rebounds per game.

The final score of Game 6 of 1976 ABA Finals was 112–106 with the Nets winning the ABA Championship over the Denver Nuggets, 4 games to 2, in New York at the Nassau Coliseum. With 4 seconds left in the game, Jones, number 33 for the Nets that season, scored the last basket making him the last player to score points in the ABA.

== Career statistics ==
Legend
GP	Games played	GS	Games started	MPG	Minutes per game
FG%	Field goal percentage	3P%	3-point field goal percentage	FT%	Free throw percentage
RPG	Rebounds per game	APG	Assists per game	SPG	Steals per game
BPG	Blocks per game	PPG	Points per game	**Bold**	Career high
*	Led the league

†	Denotes seasons in which Brown's team won an ABA championship

=== ABA/NBA ===
==== Regular season ====
Year	Team	GP	MPG	FG%	3P%	FT%	RPG	APG	SPG	BPG	PPG
1969–70	Dallas (ABA)	2	25.0	.450	–	**.909**	**11.5**	.5			14.0
1970–71	Texas (ABA)	79	26.3	.408	**.347**	.761	6.6	2.3			12.0
1971–72	Dallas (ABA)	82	35.8	**.451**	.298	.760	8.5	2.7			14.3
1972–73	Dallas (ABA)	67	**40.2**	.413	.339	.783	10.0	**4.1**			**22.3**
1973–74	San Antonio (ABA)	78	36.4	.434	.283	.772	7.4	3.4	.9	.2	15.6
1974–75	San Antonio (ABA)	**83**	37.3	.439	.260	.767	7.8	3.3	**1.1**	**.4**	19.3
1975–76†	N.Y. Nets (ABA)	**83**	29.2	.382	.224	.762	5.2	1.6	1.0	.3	13.2
1976–77	N.Y. Nets	34	25.8	.385		.760	5.7	1.4	**1.1**	.3	10.6
Career (ABA)		474	34.0	.422	.303	.770	7.5	2.8	1.0	.3	16.0
Career (overall)		508	33.4	.420	.303	.769	7.4	2.7	1.0	.3	15.6
All-Star (ABA)		2	16.5	.105	.000	–	6.0	1.5	.0	.5	2.0

==== Playoffs ====
Year	Team	GP	MPG	FG%	3P%	FT%	RPG	APG	SPG	BPG	PPG
1970	Dallas (ABA)	6	15.2	.400	.000	.500	3.8	.8			6.0
1971	Texas (ABA)	4	25.8	.300	.250	.733	5.5	2.5			9.3
1972	Dallas (ABA)	4	**36.3**	.395	.250	.500	**8.0**	**3.5**			9.5
1974	San Antonio (ABA)	7	34.1	**.516**	**.333**	**.828**	6.6	2.6	.7	.3	**17.3**
1975	San Antonio (ABA)	6	29.7	.323	.143	.286	7.5	2.5	1.2	**.7**	10.5
1976	N.Y. Nets (ABA)	**12**	35.1	.373	.133	.667	7.3	2.3	**1.8**	**.7**	13.7
Career (overall)		39	30.2	.388	.184	.674	6.5	2.3	1.3	.6	11.8
