= 1974–75 San Antonio Spurs season =

- Head coach: Tom Nissalke (18–10); Bob Bass (33–23)
- General manager: John Begzos
- Owners: Angelo Drossos; John Schaefer; Red McCombs
- Arena: HemisFair Arena

Results
- Record: 51–33 (.607)
- Place: Division: 2nd (Western); Conference: 2nd
- Playoff finish: West Division semifinals (lost to Pacers 2–4)
- Stats at Basketball Reference

Local media
- Television: WOAI 4
- Radio: KKYX

The 1974–75 San Antonio Spurs season was the second season for the San Antonio Spurs and eighth season overall when including their seasons under the Dallas Chaparrals name, including the one failed season where they attempted to rebrand themselves as the Texas Chaparrals to become a regional franchise to represent the state of Texas by playing in Lubbock and Fort Worth alongside their original home in Dallas, Texas. The Spurs made their regular season debut on October 18, 1974 by winning a 129–121 double-overtime thriller against the Indiana Pacers in Indiana. After that, the Spurs would win the next two games, getting off to a rather quick start on their ends. However, despite the Spurs going onto an 18–10 start into the season, the Spurs would fire head coach Tom Nissalke due to fans not liking the coaching style that he had for the team and replace him with Bob Bass for the rest of the season. By the end of December they would be 21–18, after finishing 7–10 in the month (with a five gaming losing streak occurring at one point with their new coach), but Bass and the Spurs would quickly recover from the poor finish for 1974 as they would enter 1975 by winning 30 of their last 45 games of the season (with the Spurs even getting a seven game winning streak at one point), which led to them finishing with over 50 victories for the first time in franchise history, either as the Spurs or as the original Chaparrals team name. However, they would only get a second place finish in the Western Division since they finished behind the Denver Nuggets there by 14 games (in what would later become the second-best record put out in ABA history behind only the 1971–72 Kentucky Colonels). In the 1975 ABA Playoffs, the Spurs once again lost in the first round to the Indiana Pacers, this time losing to them 4–2 despite the Spurs appearing to be the better team this time around due to the Pacers trading 7x All-Star Mel Daniels to the Memphis Sounds; Indiana would later reach the 1975 ABA Finals themselves, though they would lose to the Kentucky Colonels there.

== ABA Draft ==
Round	Pick	Player	Position(s)	Nationality	College
2	15	Truck Robinson	PF	United States	Tennessee State
3	29	Collis Temple	SF	United States	LSU
4	35	Fred Saunders	SF/PF	United States	Syracuse
4	36	Kim Hughes	C	United States	Wisconsin
5	45	Gene Short	SF	United States	Jackson State
6	55	Gary Anderson	G	United States	Wisconsin
7	65	Gerald Cunningham	F	United States	Kentucky State
8	75	Hercle Ivy	G	United States	Iowa State
9	85	Walter Luckett	SG	United States	Ohio University
10	95	Charles McKinney	C	United States	Baylor
10	100	Mike Ogan	C	United States	Carson–Newman

This draft table does not include the "ABA Draft of NBA Players" that was done immediately afterward.

=== ABA Draft of NBA Players ===
Round	Pick	Player	Position(s)	Nationality	College	NBA Team
1	5	Tom Boerwinkle	C	United States	Tennessee	Chicago Bulls
2	15	Clyde Lee	PF/C	United States	Vanderbilt	Golden State Warriors
3	25	Neal Walk	C	United States	Florida	Phoenix Suns
4	35	Steve Kuberski	PF/C	United States	Bradley	Boston Celtics
5	45	Lloyd Neal	PF/C	United States	Tennessee State	Portland Trail Blazers

The "ABA Draft of NBA Players" that was done on April 17, 1974 happened immediately after the actual ABA Draft done for this season was concluded on that day. None of the five players drafted by the Spurs would report to the team this season. Interestingly, the Spurs would join the Kentucky Colonels as the only two ABA teams that year to not draft any NBA players that would later go on to become members of the Naismith Basketball Hall of Fame.

== Roster ==
1974–75 San Antonio Spurs roster
Players

Pos.	No.	Player	Height	Weight	DOB	From
PF	25	Coby Dietrick	6 ft 10 in (2.08 m)	220 lb (100 kg)	July 23, 1948	San José State
SF	23	Will Franklin	6 ft 7 in (2.01 m)	220 lb (100 kg)	October 19, 1949	Purdue
SG	20	Donnie Freeman	6 ft 3 in (1.91 m)	185 lb (84 kg)	July 18, 1944	Illinois
SF	44	George Gervin	6 ft 7 in (2.01 m)	180 lb (82 kg)	April 27, 1952	Eastern Michigan
PF	33	Rich Jones	6 ft 6 in (1.98 m)	220 lb (100 kg)	December 27, 1946	Memphis
PG	22	George Karl	6 ft 2 in (1.88 m)	190 lb (86 kg)	May 12, 1951	North Carolina
PF	34	Stan Love	6 ft 9 in (2.06 m)	215 lb (98 kg)	April 9, 1949	Oregon
C	31	Swen Nater	6 ft 11 in (2.11 m)	240 lb (109 kg)	January 14, 1950	UCLA
PG	13	James Silas	6 ft 1 in (1.85 m)	180 lb (82 kg)	February 11, 1949	Stephen F. Austin
SF	40	Collis Temple	6 ft 5 in (1.96 m)	220 lb (100 kg)	November 8, 1952	LSU
SF	30	Chuck Terry	6 ft 8 in (2.03 m)	215 lb (98 kg)	September 27, 1950	Long Beach State
SG	21	Bob Warren	6 ft 5 in (1.96 m)	190 lb (86 kg)	July 17, 1946	Vanderbilt

Coaches
Head coach
- Tom Nissalke / Bob Bass

Legend
- (DP) Unsigned draft pick
- (FA) Free agent
- (S) Suspended
- Injured

== Regular season ==
=== ABA Schedule ===
Game	Date	Opponent	Result	Spurs	Opponents	Record
1						
2						

=== Season standings ===
1974–75 ABA Western Standings
Western Division	W	L	PCT.	GB
Denver Nuggets	65	19	.774	–
San Antonio Spurs	51	33	.607	14
Indiana Pacers	45	39	.536	20
Utah Stars	38	46	.452	27
San Diego Conquistadors	31	53	.469	34

== ABA Playoffs ==
ABA Western Division Semifinals

Game	Date	Location	Score	Record	Attendance
1	April 5	San Antonio	119–122 (OT)	0–1	8,529
2	April 7	San Antonio	93–98	0–2	7,643
3	April 10	Indiana	103–113	0–3	12,217
4	April 12	Indiana	110–109	1–3	17,389
5	April 14	San Antonio	123–117	2–3	10,986
6	April 16	Indiana	100–115	2–4	15,675

Spurs lose series, 4–2
