= 1973–74 Indiana Pacers season =

ABA professional basketball team season

- Head coach: Bobby Leonard
- Arena: Fairgrounds Coliseum

Results
- Record: 46–38 (.548)
- Place: Division: 2nd Conference: 2nd
- Playoff finish: Division Finals (lost to Stars 3–4)
- Radio: WIBC

The 1973–74 Indiana Pacers season was the franchise's seventh season both as a team and while in the American Basketball Association. Entering this season, the Pacers sought to not just obtain a three-peat of championships while in the ABA, but also win their fourth championship in five seasons after previously winning the ABA Finals in 1970, 1972, and 1973. However, the Pacers would finish the season with a 46–38 record, posting a five win downgrade from the previous season. Despite that notion, the Pacers would still finish in second place for the Western Division for the season, behind only the Utah Stars there. While in the playoffs, the Pacers would go tooth and nail with the San Antonio Spurs, surviving the first round in seven games, before losing the Western Division Finals to the Utah Stars in seven games themselves (with the Stars later losing the 1974 ABA Finals to the New York Nets by five games), thus preventing the Pacers from becoming the sole dynasty of the ABA with four championships in five years.

== ABA Draft ==
Interestingly, this year's ABA draft would involve four different types of drafts throughout the early 1973 year: a "Special Circumstances Draft" on January 15, a "Senior Draft" on April 25, an "Undergraduate Draft" also on April 25, and a "Supplemental Draft" on May 18, though the Pacers joined the New York Nets as one of two teams to avoid using that last draft entirely. Still, the following selections were made in these respective drafts by the Pacers.

=== ABA Special Circumstances Draft ===
Round	Pick	Player	Position(s)	Nationality	College
1	2	Mike Green	PF/C	United States	Louisiana Tech
2	14	Dave Cowens	SF	United States	Houston

=== ABA Senior Draft ===
Round	Pick	Player	Position(s)	Nationality	College
1	7	Steve Downing	C	United States	Indiana
2	17	Jim O'Brien	SG/SF	United States	Maryland
3	27	Jim Resteck	F	United States	Auburn
4	37	John Ritter	F	United States	Indiana
5	47	Allan Hornyak	SG	United States	Ohio State
6	57	Joe Wallace	SF	United States	Denver
7	67	Jim Andrews	C	United States	Kentucky
8	77	Mike Edwards	SG	United States	Tennessee
9	87	Bobby Wilson	G	United States	Wichita State (redshirt)
10	97	Byron Jones	F	United States	San Francisco

The "Senior Draft" done in April is often considered the official, main draft period of the 1973 ABA draft by basketball historians.

=== ABA Special Circumstances Draft ===
Round	Pick	Player	Position(s)	Nationality	College
11 (1)	107 (7)	Len Elmore	PF/C	United States	Maryland
12 (2)	117 (17)	Rudy Jackson	C	United States	Hutchinson Community Junior College

The "Undergraduate Draft" is considered a continuation of the "Senior Draft" that was done earlier that same day, hence the numbering of the rounds and draft picks here. Also, the Pacers joined the New York Nets as one of only two teams to decline participation in the "Supplementary Draft" entirely, meaning there will be no section for that draft with the Pacers here.

== Roster ==
1973–74 Indiana Pacers roster
Players

Pos.	No.	Player	Height	Weight	DOB	From
SF	22	Bob Arnzen	6 ft 5 in (1.96 m)	205 lb (93 kg)	November 3, 1947	Notre Dame
SF	22	Johnny Baum	6 ft 5 in (1.96 m)	200 lb (91 kg)	June 17, 1946	Temple
SF	35	Roger Brown	6 ft 5 in (1.96 m)	205 lb (93 kg)	May 22, 1942	Dayton
PG	10	Don Buse	6 ft 4 in (1.93 m)	190 lb (86 kg)	August 10, 1950	Evansville
SG	33	Larry Cannon	6 ft 4 in (1.93 m)	195 lb (88 kg)	April 12, 1947	La Salle
C	34	Mel Daniels	6 ft 9 in (2.06 m)	220 lb (100 kg)	July 20, 1944	New Mexico
SG	13	Donnie Freeman	6 ft 3 in (1.91 m)	185 lb (84 kg)	July 18, 1944	Illinois
PF	20	Darnell Hillman	6 ft 9 in (2.06 m)	215 lb (98 kg)	August 29, 1949	San José State
SG	43	Kevin Joyce	6 ft 3 in (1.91 m)	190 lb (86 kg)	June 27, 1951	South Carolina
SG	11	Billy Keller	5 ft 10 in (1.78 m)	177 lb (80 kg)	August 30, 1947	Purdue
PG	14	Freddie Lewis	6 ft 0 in (1.83 m)	175 lb (79 kg)	July 1, 1943	Arizona State
PF	30	George McGinnis	6 ft 8 in (2.03 m)	235 lb (107 kg)	August 12, 1950	Indiana
C	24	Bob Netolicky	6 ft 9 in (2.06 m)	220 lb (100 kg)	August 2, 1942	Drake
PF	24	Bill Newton	6 ft 9 in (2.06 m)	220 lb (100 kg)	December 22, 1950	LSU

Coaches
Head coach
- Bobby Leonard

Legend
- (DP) Unsigned draft pick
- (FA) Free agent
- (S) Suspended
- Injured

Roster

== Season standings ==
=== Western Division ===
Team	W	L	Pct.
Utah Stars	51	33	.607
Indiana Pacers	46	38	.548
San Antonio Spurs	45	39	.536
San Diego Conquistadors	37	47	.440
Denver Rockets	37	47	.440

== Player stats ==
Legend
GP	Games played	GS	Games started	MPG	Minutes per game
FG%	Field-goal percentage	3P%	3-point field-goal percentage	FT%	Free-throw percentage
RPG	Rebounds per game	APG	Assists per game	SPG	Steals per game
BPG	Blocks per game	PPG	Points per game

Player	GP	MPG	RPG	APG	SPG	BPG	PPG
George McGinnis	80	40.8	15.0	3.3	2.0	0.5	25.9
Mel Daniels	78	32.6	11.6	1.6	0.7	1.2	15.4
Roger Brown	82	30.8	4.8	2.8	0.7	0.7	11.8
Darnell Hillman	83	27.9	8.1	1.2	0.8	2.1	9.1
Freddie Lewis	78	27.7	2.6	4.1	1.3	0.1	9.9
Donnie Freeman	66	26.3	2.5	2.5	0.7	0.3	14.3
Don Buse	77	24.4	3.3	3.4	1.9	0.3	5.5
Bob Netolicky	56	20.7	5.2	0.9	0.4	0.4	9.1
Bill Keller	75	19.0	1.7	2.3	0.5	0.0	9.5
Kevin Joyce	56	17.6	1.6	2.3	0.6	0.1	7.3
Larry Cannon	3	8.7	1.0	1.0	0.0	0.0	2.3
Johnny Baum	13	8.7	1.9	0.2	0.5	0.2	2.8
Bob Arnzen	20	7.5	1.0	0.2	0.2	0.1	2.8
Bill Newton	11	6.6	1.6	0.5	0.2	0.0	1.4

== ABA Playoffs ==
Western Division Semifinals vs San Antonio Spurs

Game	Date	Location	Score	Record	Attendance
1	March 30	Indiana	109–113	0–1	7,438
2	April 1	Indiana	128–101	1–1	6,988
3	April 3	San Antonio	96–115	1–2	10,693
4	April 4	San Antonio	91–89	2–2	12,079
5	April 6	Indiana	105–100	3–2	10,079
6	April 10	San Antonio	86–102	3–3	12,304
7	April 12	Indiana	86–79	4–3	10,079

Pacers win series, 4–3

ABA Western Division Finals vs Utah Stars

Game	Date	Location	Score	Record	Attendance
1	April 13	Utah	96–105	0–1	7,557
2	April 15	Utah	102–106	0–2	7,143
3	April 17	Indiana	90–99	0–3	6,337
4	April 18	Indiana	118–107	1–3	6,265
5	April 22	Utah	110–101	2–3	10,248
6	April 25	Indiana	91–89	3–3	9,482
7	April 27	Utah	87–109	3–4	12,191

Pacers lose series, 4–3

== Awards, records, and honors ==
=== ABA All-Stars ===
- Mel Daniels
- George McGinnis
