= Bobby Fields =

American basketball player

Personal information
- Born: October 20, 1949 (age 77) Chicago, Illinois, U.S.
- Listed height: 6 ft 3 in (1.91 m)
- Listed weight: 175 lb (79 kg)

Career information
- High school: St. Mel (Chicago, Illinois)
- College: Brandywine JC (1967–1969); La Salle (1969–1971)
- NBA draft: 1971: 4th round, 54th overall pick
- Drafted by: Portland Trail Blazers
- Playing career: 1971–1974
- Position: Guard
- Number: 23

Career history
- 1971–1972: Utah Stars
- 1972–1973: Scranton Apollos
- 1973–1974: Hazleton Bullets
- Stats at Basketball Reference

Robert L. Fields (born October 20, 1949) is a retired professional basketball player who spent one season in the American Basketball Association (ABA) as a member of the Utah Stars (1971–72). He attended La Salle University where he was selected by the Portland Trail Blazers during the fourth round of the 1971 NBA draft, but he never played for them. He now coaches basketball at St. Albans School for Boys.

Fields played in the Eastern Basketball Association (EBA) for the Scranton Apollos and Hazleton Bullets from 1972 to 1974.
