= 1971 ABA All-Star Game =

Exhibition basketball game

The fourth American Basketball Association All-Star Game was played January 23, 1971 at Greensboro Coliseum in Greensboro, North Carolina before an audience at 14,407. Al Bianchi of the Virginia Squires coached the East and Bill Sharman of the Utah Stars coached the West.

== Results ==
Rick Barry scored four points in the final 49 seconds as the East overcame an 18-point third-quarter deficit. Mel Daniels of the Indiana Pacers was named MVP after scoring 29 points and grabbing 13 rebounds.

Score by Periods:	1	2	3	4	Final
West	29	40	28	25	122
East	33	26	33	34	126

== Western Conference ==
Player, Team	MIN	FGM	FGA	3PM	3PA	FTM	FTA	REB	AST	PTS
Mel Daniels, IND	30	12	19	0	0	5	7	13	3	29
Roger Brown, IND	28	3	11	0	2	6	8	3	3	12
Donnie Freeman, TEX	27	6	12	0	0	5	8	7	3	17
Jimmy Jones, MMP	27	3	5	0	1	7	9	0	4	13
Zelmo Beaty, UTS	27	5	11	0	0	2	3	8	3	12
Bob Netolicky, IND	22	3	4	0	0	0	2	4	1	6
Steve Jones, MMP	21	4	9	0	0	1	1	3	0	9
Wendell Ladner, MMP	20	6	11	0	0	0	0	7	0	12
Glen Combs, UTS	17	1	7	0	2	0	2	1	2	2
Red Robbins, UTS	14	2	6	0	0	0	0	2	1	4
Julius Keye, DNR	7	0	1	0	0	0	3	4	0	0
Ron Boone, UTS	4	2	4	0	0	2	3	2	0	6
Totals	240	47	100	0	5	28	43	54	20	122

== Eastern Conference ==
Player, Team	MIN	FGM	FGA	3PM	3PA	FTM	FTA	REB	AST	PTS
Dan Issel, KEN	34	8	15	0	0	5	8	11	0	21
Joe Caldwell, CAR	32	10	19	0	0	1	3	8	3	21
John Brisker, PTC	27	5	19	0	1	5	7	17	1	15
Bill Melchionni, NYN	24	5	10	0	0	2	3	1	4	12
Cincinnatus Powell, KEN	21	4	6	0	0	3	3	10	0	11
Charlie Scott, VIR	21	2	6	0	0	3	6	2	3	7
Mack Calvin, FLO	20	2	7	1	2	3	7	4	4	8
Larry Jones, FLO	18	2	3	0	0	2	2	2	1	6
Rick Barry, NYN	17	4	6	0	0	6	6	2	2	14
Mike Lewis, PTC	14	3	7	0	0	1	1	5	1	7
George Carter, VIR	8	2	3	0	0	0	0	2	0	4
Neil Johnson, VIR	4	0	3	0	0	0	0	1	0	0
Totals	240	47	104	1	3	31	48	65	19	126

- Halftime — West, 69–59
- Third Quarter — West, 97–92
- Officials: Norm Drucker and Joe Gushue
- Attendance: 14,407
