= Donnie Freeman (basketball, born 1944) =

American basketball player (born 1944)

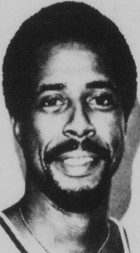

Personal information
- Born: July 18, 1944 (age 82) Madison, Illinois, U.S.
- Listed height: 6 ft 3 in (1.91 m)
- Listed weight: 185 lb (84 kg)

Career information
- High school: Madison (Madison, Illinois)
- College: Illinois (1963–1966)
- NBA draft: 1966: 3rd round, 29th overall pick
- Drafted by: Philadelphia 76ers
- Playing career: 1967–1976
- Position: Shooting guard / point guard
- Number: 20, 13

Career history
- 1967–1970: Minnesota Muskies / Miami Floridians
- 1971: Utah Stars
- 1971–1972: Texas / Dallas Chaparrals
- 1972–1974: Indiana Pacers
- 1974–1975: San Antonio Spurs
- 1975–1976: Los Angeles Lakers

Career highlights
- ABA champion (1973); ABA All-Time Team; 5× ABA All-Star (1968–1972); All-ABA First Team (1972); 3× All-ABA Second Team (1969–1971)

Career ABA and NBA statistics
- Points: 12,233 (18.9 ppg)
- Rebounds: 2,292 (3.5 rpg)
- Assists: 2,292 (3.5 apg)
- Stats at NBA.com
- Stats at Basketball Reference

Donald E. Freeman (born July 18, 1944) is an American former professional basketball player. He spent eight seasons (1967–1975) in the American Basketball Association (ABA) and one season (1975–1976) in the National Basketball Association (NBA). Freeman was the youngest of four children.

== High school and college career ==
A 6'3" guard, Freeman attended Madison High School and the University of Illinois. At Illinois, he scored 1449 points and averaged 20.1 points and 10.3 rebounds per game over his three varsity seasons. After finishing his college career as the most prolific scorer in Illinois history, he now ranks 12th all-time in Illinois scoring, and set a record for most points in a season (668), averaging 27.8 in 1965–66. He received first team All Big Ten and first team All-American honors that same season. In 2004, he was named to the University of Illinois' All Century Team.

== Playing career ==
He was selected by the Philadelphia 76ers in the third round of the 1966 NBA draft. Freeman never played for the Sixers; rather, he spent the first eight seasons of his career in the ABA, playing for the Minnesota Muskies, Miami Floridians, Texas/Dallas Chaparrals, Utah Stars, Indiana Pacers, and San Antonio Spurs. He scored 11,544 during his ABA career and appeared in five ABA All-Star Games. His point total ranks 7th all-time in the ABA. Freeman then joined the NBA's Los Angeles Lakers in 1975. He spent one season with that club, averaging 10.8 points per game before retiring in 1976.

After his career ended, he returned to Champaign, Illinois, where he launched a career in banking. His son, also named Don, was born in 1967, and later attended Rice University on a tennis scholarship. In 1981, he moved to Texas and later to Omaha, Nebraska, where he still resides.

== Honors ==
=== Basketball ===
- 1965 – 3rd Team All-Big Ten
- 1966 – Team Captain
- 1966 – Team MVP
- 1966 – 1st Team All-Big Ten
- 1966 – 1st Team All-American
- 1973 – Inducted into the Illinois Basketball Coaches Association's Hall of Fame as a player.
- 2004 – Elected to the "Illini Men's Basketball All-Century Team".
- 2008 – Honored jersey which hangs in the State Farm Center to show regard for being the most decorated basketball players in the University of Illinois' history.
- 2019 – Inducted into the Illinois Athletics Hall of Fame

== College ==
Season	Games	Points	PPG	Field Goals	Attempts	Avg	Free Throws	Attempts	Avg	Rebounds	Avg	Big Ten Record	Overall Record
1963–64	24	341	14.2	130	316	.411	81	122	.664	231	9.6	6–8	13–11
1964–65	24	440	18.3	178	365	.488	84	122	.689	226	9.4	10–4	18–6
1965–66	24	668	27.8	258	595	.434	152	197	.772	285	11.9	8–6	12–12
Totals	72	1449	20.1	566	1276	.444	317	441	.719	742	10.3	24–18	43–29

== ABA/NBA career statistics ==
Legend
GP	Games played	MPG	Minutes per game
FG%	Field-goal percentage	FT%	Free-throw percentage
RPG	Rebounds per game	APG	Assists per game
PPG	Points per game	**Bold**	Career high

†	Denotes season in which Freeman won an ABA championship
*	Led the league

=== Regular season ===
Year	Team	GP	MPG	FG%	FT%	RPG	APG	PPG
1967–68	Minnesota	69	35.2	.409	.715	4.7	2.8	16.3
1968–69	Miami	78	36.8	**.484**	.787	3.7	**6.4**	22.1
1969–70	Miami	**79**	**40.1**	.456	.822	**5.1**	3.7	**27.4**
1970–71	Utah	24	33.4	.479	.831	5.7	4.9	23.6
1970–71	Texas	42	38.4	.485	.778	4.5	5.1	23.6
1971–72	Dallas	72	33.0	.471	**.825**	2.9	3.4	24.1
1972–73	Indiana	77	28.2	.443	.808	2.8	2.5	14.3
1973–74	Indiana	66	26.3	.456	.797	2.5	2.5	14.3
1974–75	San Antonio	77	30.9	.448	.821	2.4	2.6	15.5
1975–76	Los Angeles	64	23.1	.434	.819	2.8	2.7	10.8
Career		648	32.4	.457	.800	3.5	3.5	18.9

=== Playoffs ===
Year	Team	GP	MPG	FG%	FT%	RPG	APG	PPG
1968	Minnesota	10	**36.5**	.418	.730	5.0	**5.6**	15.8
1969	Miami	12	36.2	**.458**	**.813**	4.0	4.2	21.4
1971	Texas	4	36.0	.452	**.813**	**6.0**	1.3	22.3
1972	Dallas	4	36.0	.437	.630	**6.0**	2.5	**26.8**
1973	Indiana	**18**	30.9	.443	.798	2.7	2.8	15.6
1974	Indiana	6	26.3	.435	.700	1.7	1.3	12.3
1975	San Antonio	6	27.7	.458	.800	2.3	3.2	12.3
Career		60	32.8	.444	.767	3.6	3.3	17.3

=== All-Star Game ===
Year	Team	GP	MPG	FG%	FT%	RPG	APG	PPG
1968	Minnesota	1	24.0	**.615**	.667	4.0	2.0	20.0
1969	Miami	1	**27.0**	.538	**1.000**	6.0	**7.0**	**21.0**
1970	Miami	1	24.0	.250	.667	4.0	5.0	10.0
1971	Texas	1	**27.0**	.500	.625	**7.0**	3.0	17
1972	Dallas	1	21.0	.375	.875	5.0	2.0	13
Career		5	24.6	.452	.781	5.2	3.8	16.2
