= Goo Kennedy =

American basketball player (1949–2020)

Personal information
- Born: August 23, 1949 Charlotte, North Carolina, U.S.
- Died: December 8, 2020 (aged 71) Texas

Career information
- High school: West Charlotte (Charlotte, North Carolina)
- College: Fort Worth CC (1968–1970); TCU (1970–1971)
- NBA draft: 1971: 9th round, 139th overall pick
- Drafted by: Portland Trail Blazers
- Playing career: 1971–1978
- Position: Power forward / center
- Number: 50, 55, 44, 30

Career history
- 1971–1974: Dallas Chaparrals / San Antonio Spurs
- 1974–1975: Spirits of St. Louis
- 1975: Utah Stars
- 1976–1977: Houston Rockets

Career highlights
- SWC Player of the Year (1971); First-team All-SWC (1971)

Career ABA and NBA statistics
- Points: 2,739 (8.2 ppg)
- Rebounds: 1,866 (5.6 rpg)
- Assists: 299 (0.9 apg)
- Stats at NBA.com
- Stats at Basketball Reference

Eugene "Goo" Kennedy (August 23, 1949 – December 8, 2020) was an American professional basketball player.

A 6'7" forward/center, Kennedy played one season (1970–71) of college basketball at Texas Christian University, and was named the Southwest Conference Player of the Year after leading the TCU Horned Frogs to the conference championship. He averaged 16.6 rebounds per game that season, with a high of 28 versus the University of Arkansas.

After college, Kennedy played four seasons in the American Basketball Association as a member of the Dallas Chaparrals/San Antonio Spurs, Spirits of St. Louis, and Utah Stars. He then played one season in the National Basketball Association with the Houston Rockets. He averaged 8.2 points and 5.6 rebounds per game during his professional career.

Kennedy and his wife, Mary, raised over forty foster children over the years.

Kennedy died at age 71 on 8 December 2020, according to his daughter Eugenia. The cause of death was not immediately known.
