= Joe Hamilton (basketball) =

American basketball player

Personal information
- Born: July 5, 1948 (age 78) Lexington, Kentucky
- Listed height: 5 ft 10 in (1.78 m)
- Listed weight: 160 lb (73 kg)

Career information
- High school: Dunbar (Lexington, Kentucky)
- College: Christian Coll. of the Southwest (1966–1968); North Texas (1968–1970)
- NBA draft: 1970: 9th round, 152nd overall pick
- Drafted by: Milwaukee Bucks
- Playing career: 1970–1975
- Position: Point guard
- Number: 11, 3, 12, 10

Career history
- 1970–1974: Texas/Dallas Chaparrals / San Antonio Spurs
- 1974: Kentucky Colonels
- 1975: Munich Eagles
- 1975: Utah Stars

Career highlights
- ABA All-Rookie Team (1971); 2× First-team All-MVC (1969, 1970)
- Stats at Basketball Reference

James "Joe" Hamilton Jr. (born July 5, 1948) is an American former professional basketball player.

== College career ==
Hamilton played high school basketball at Dunbar (Lexington, Kentucky) where he was an All-American.

He played collegiately at Christian College of the Southwest (Garland, Texas), where he was a two-time Junior College All American. He was also an alternate on the United States team for the 1968 Olympics. He transferred to North Texas State in 1968 and was a two-time All-Missouri Valley Conference Player.

== Professional career ==
Hamilton was selected in the ninth round (152 overall) of the 1970 NBA draft by the Milwaukee Bucks. He was also picked in the fourth round of the 1970 American Basketball Association Draft by the Texas Chaparrals and signed with the ABA team. He scored 1,318 points in 84 games (15.7 points per game) during the 1970–71 ABA season and made the ABA All-Rookie team. He stayed with the team for the next three seasons (as it became the Dallas Chaparrals and then San Antonio Spurs). He next played for the Kentucky Colonels but was cut 9 games into the 1974–75 season. Though he was contacted by his former Spurs coach Tom Nissalke to rejoin the team, Nissalke was fired soon after. He was then offered a minimum salary contract by the Memphis Sounds but the ABA veteran turned it down.

He instead played for the Munich Eagles of the European Professional Basketball League. Though he was the league top scorer with 24 points per game (along with a league second-best 4 assists), the league folded in April 1975 with Hamilton still owed part of his salary. He was signed by Nissalke, now coach of the Utah Stars, in late 1975 but was traded ten days later to the newly formed Baltimore Claws. The Claws reportedly ran out of money (with Hamilton stating the players "couldn't even get meal money") and folded three days before the 1975–76 ABA season. He returned to the Utah Stars and played the start of the season with them. However the Stars would themselves fold in December 1975. After these bad breaks, Hamilton retired from basketball at 27 to work as district salesman for a basketball shoe manufacturer in Chicago. The married father of two preferred the security of a stable job over an offer to play in the semi-pro Eastern League.
