= Roderick McDonald (basketball) =

American basketball player

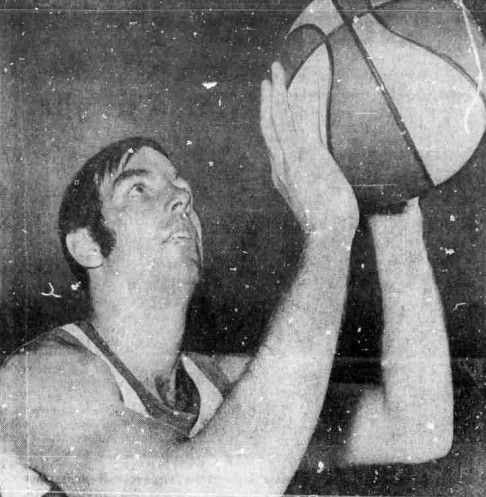
- McDonald, circa 1970

Personal information
- Born: April 9, 1945 Jacksonville, Florida, U.S.
- Died: January 17, 2015 (aged 69) San Jose, California, U.S.
- Listed height: 6 ft 6 in (1.98 m)
- Listed weight: 200 lb (91 kg)

Career information
- High school: Clover Park (Lakewood, Washington)
- College: Whitworth (1963–1967)
- NBA draft: 1967: 9th round, 101st overall pick
- Drafted by: Seattle SuperSonics
- Playing career: 1970–1973
- Position: Small forward / power forward
- Number: 14

Career history
- 1970–1973: Utah Stars

Career highlights
- ABA champion (1971)

Career statistics
- Points: 282 (3.2 ppg)
- Rebounds: 197 (2.3 rpg)
- Stats at Basketball Reference

Roderick McDonald (April 9, 1945 – January 17, 2015) was an American professional basketball player. McDonald was born in Jacksonville, Florida. He spent his early childhood in Japan, New York and Panama. He graduated from Cloverpark High School in 1963.

== College career ==
McDonald played at Whitworth University, for the Pirates basketball team. He was an NAIA All-American in 1967. Later in life, he would be inducted into the Whitworth University Heritage Hall of Fame.

== Professional career ==
He was drafted in the ninth round (110th overall) by the Seattle SuperSonics in the 1967 NBA draft, but he never played for them. After a stint in the Army where he earned an honorable discharge, he was drafted by the Utah Stars, starting with the 1970 season. Nicknamed "The Rocket", he played for three years, winning an ABA Championship in 1971. In those playoffs, he played 5 games and averaged 3.6 points and 2.6 rebounds. In his two subsequent playoff experiences, he would score an average of 6.0 and 0.7 points per game, while only playing 1 and 3 games, respectively.

He played 87 games in his career.

After his career ended, he moved to San Jose with his wife, whom he was married to for 43 years. On January 17, 2015, McDonald died. He was survived by his two children and four grandchildren.
