= 1970–71 ABA season =

- League: American Basketball Association
- Sport: Basketball
- Duration: October 14, 1970 – May 18, 1971
- Games: 84
- Teams: 11

Regular season
- Top seed: Indiana Pacers
- Season MVP: Mel Daniels (Indiana)
- Top scorer: Dan Issel (Kentucky)

Playoffs
- Eastern champions: Kentucky Colonels
- Eastern runners-up: Virginia Squires
- Western champions: Utah Stars
- Western runners-up: Indiana Pacers

Finals
- Champions: Utah Stars
- Runners-up: Kentucky Colonels

ABA seasons
- ← 1969–70 1971–72 →

The 1970–71 ABA season was the fourth season of the American Basketball Association.

Notable franchise moves from the previous season included:

- The Washington Caps moved to Norfolk, Virginia, became the Virginia Squires regional franchise, and switched divisions with the Indiana Pacers.
- The Miami Floridians became more of a regional franchise and were renamed simply The Floridians.
- The Los Angeles Stars moved to Salt Lake City, Utah, and became the Utah Stars.
- The Dallas Chaparrals became a regional franchise and were renamed the Texas Chaparrals.
- The New Orleans Buccaneers moved to Memphis, Tennessee, and became the Memphis Pros. (Originally, the Buccaneers planned to be a regional franchise called the Louisiana Buccaneers for this season.)

Other notable events included the jumping of last season's Most Valuable Player Spencer Haywood from the Denver Rockets to the NBA's Seattle SuperSonics after playing just one season with them, which inflamed ABA management amid rumblings of failed talks to merge with the NBA.

The Utah Stars, led by Zelmo Beaty and Willie Wise, won the ABA championship, defeating the Kentucky Colonels, 4 games to 3, in the ABA Finals.

Coaching changes
Offseason
Team	1969–70 coach	1970–71 coach
New York Nets	York Larese	Lou Carnesecca
Pittsburgh Condors	Buddy Jeannette	Jack McMahon
In-season
Team	Outgoing coach	Incoming coach
Carolina Cougars	Bones McKinney	Jerry Steele
Denver Rockets	Joe Belmont	Stan Albeck
The Floridians	Harold Blitman	Bob Bass
Kentucky Colonels	Gene Rhodes; Alex Groza (interim)	Alex Groza (interim); Frank Ramsey
Texas Chaparrals	Max Williams	Bill Blakeley

== Teams ==
1970–71 American Basketball Association
Division	Team	City	Arena	Capacity
Eastern	Carolina Cougars	Greensboro, North Carolina; Charlotte, North Carolina; Raleigh, North Carolina	Greensboro Coliseum; Charlotte Coliseum; Dorton Arena	15,000; 9,605; 7,610
Eastern	Kentucky Colonels	Louisville, Kentucky	Freedom Hall	16,664
Eastern	New York Nets	West Hempstead, New York	Island Garden	5,200
Eastern	Pittsburgh Condors	Pittsburgh, Pennsylvania	Civic Arena	12,580
Eastern	The Floridians	Miami Beach, Florida; Tampa, Florida; St. Petersburg, Florida; Jacksonville, Florida; West Palm Beach, Florida	Miami Beach Convention Center; Curtis Hixon Hall; Bayfront Arena; Jacksonville Coliseum; West Palm Beach Auditorium	15,000; 7,000; 7,500; 11,000; 5,000
Eastern	Virginia Squires	Norfolk, Virginia; Hampton, Virginia; Richmond, Virginia; Salem, Virginia; Roanoke, Virginia	Old Dominion University Fieldhouse; Hampton Coliseum; Richmond Arena; Salem Civic Center; Roanoke Civic Center	5,200; 9,777; 6,000; 6,820; 9,828
Western	Denver Rockets	Denver, Colorado	Denver Auditorium Arena	6,841
Western	Indiana Pacers	Indianapolis, Indiana	Indiana State Fair Coliseum	10,000
Western	Memphis Pros	Memphis, Tennessee	Mid-South Coliseum	10,085
Western	Texas Chaparrals	University Park, Texas; Dallas, Texas; Fort Worth, Texas; Lubbock, Texas	Moody Coliseum; Dallas Memorial Auditorium; Tarrant County Coliseum; Lubbock Municipal Coliseum	8,998; 9,815; 16,057; 11,200
Western	Utah Stars	Salt Lake City, Utah	Salt Palace	12,166

=== Map of teams ===
Eastern Division Western Division

== Final standings ==
=== Eastern Division ===
Team	W	L	PCT.	GB
Virginia Squires *	55	29	.655	—
Kentucky Colonels *	44	40	.524	11.0
New York Nets *	40	44	.476	15.0
The Floridians *	37	47	.440	18.0
Pittsburgh Condors	36	48	.429	19.0
Carolina Cougars	34	50	.405	21.0

=== Western Division ===
Team	W	L	PCT.	GB
Indiana Pacers *	58	26	.690	—
**Utah Stars** *	57	27	.679	1.0
Memphis Pros *	41	43	.488	17.0
Texas Chaparrals *	30	54	.357	28.0
Denver Rockets *	30	54	.357	28.0

Asterisk (*) denotes playoff team (the Rockets and the Chaparrals played a one-game playoff to settle the tie for the final playoff spot, which the Chaparrals won)

Bold – ABA champions

== Awards and honors ==
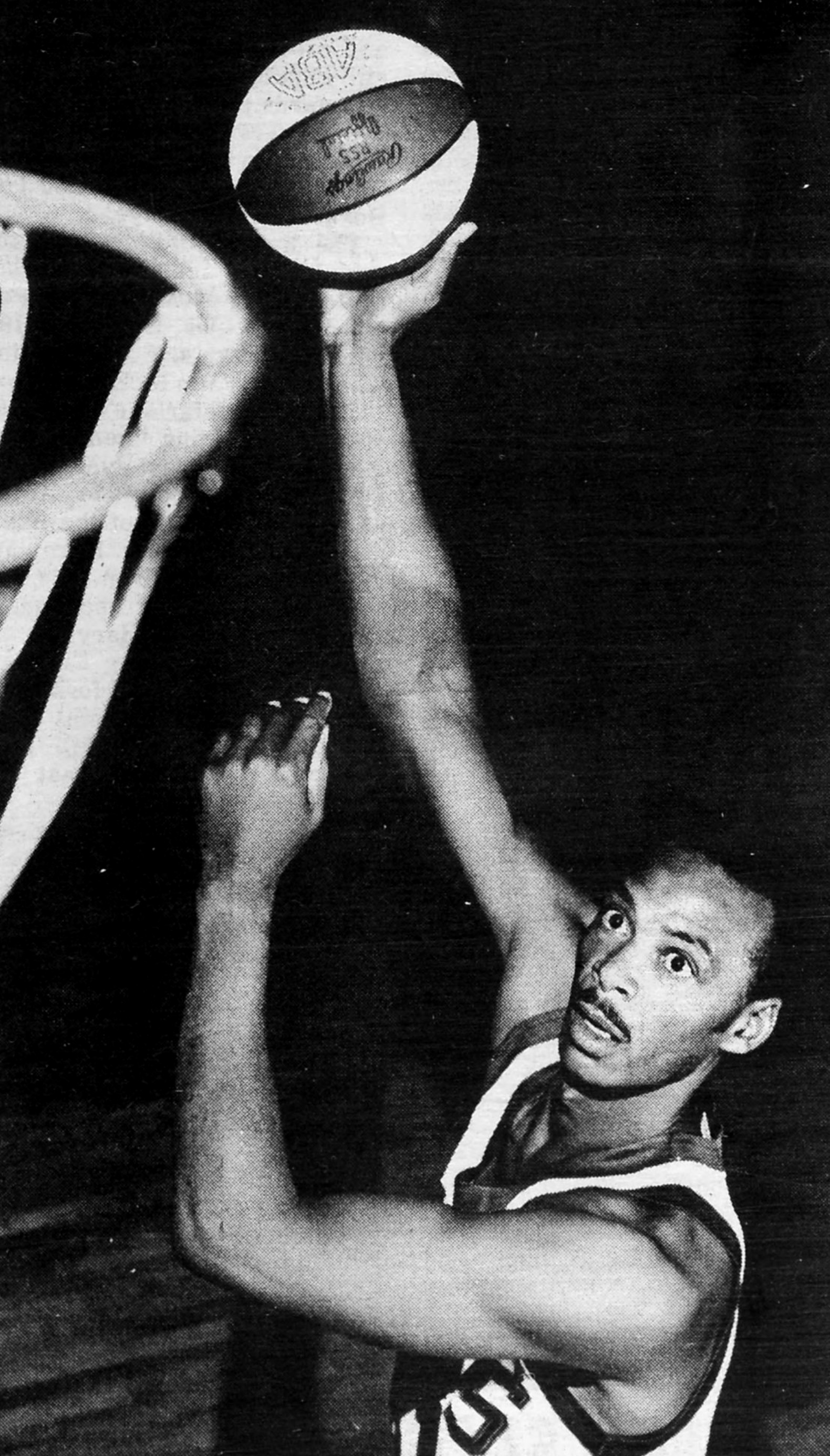
Zelmo Beaty (Utah) was named Playoffs MVP

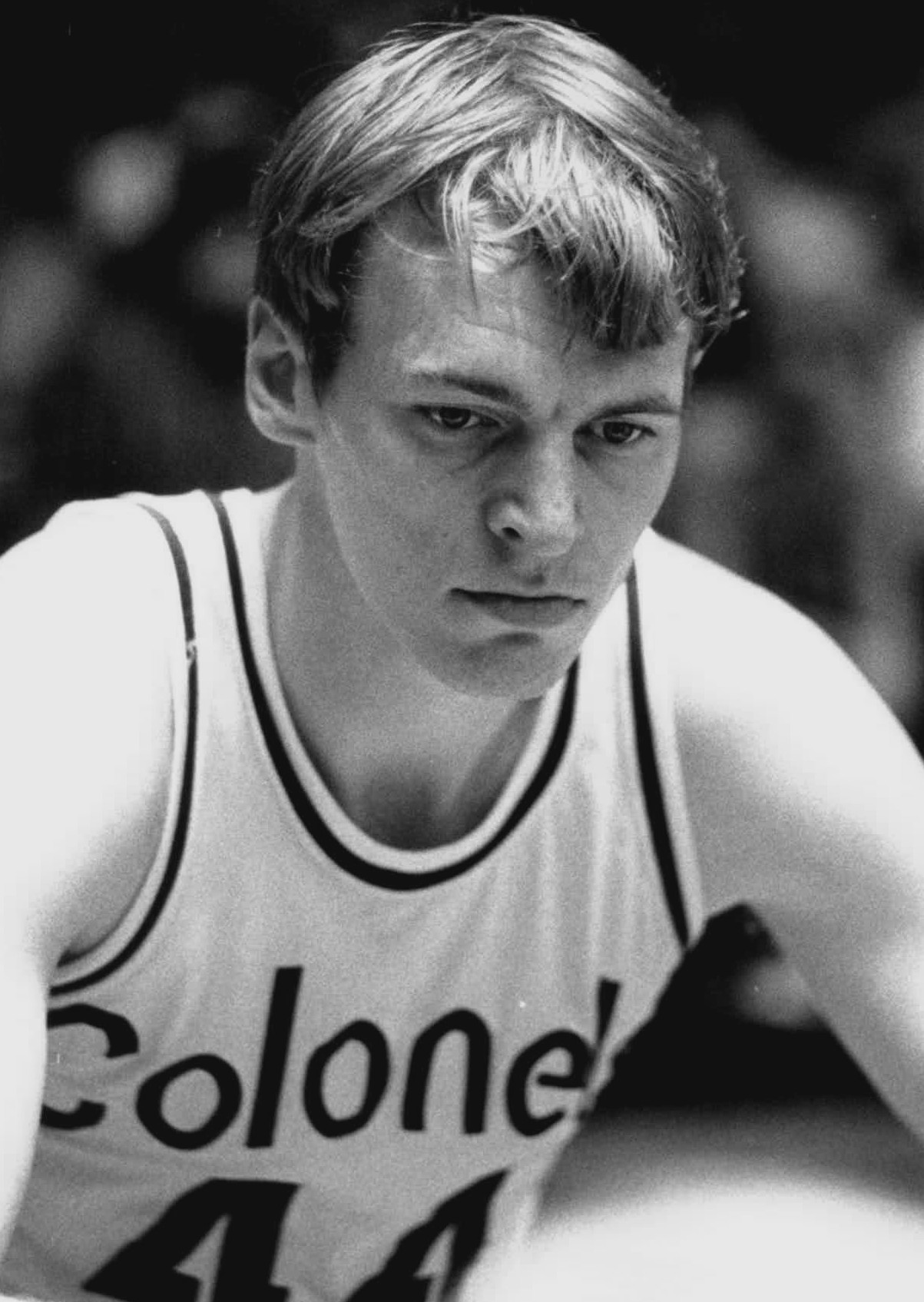
Dan Issel (Kentucky) won the 1970–71 scoring title

- ABA Most Valuable Player Award: Mel Daniels, Indiana Pacers (2nd time)
- Rookie of the Year: Charlie Scott, Virginia Squires & Dan Issel, Kentucky Colonels
- Coach of the Year: Al Bianchi, Virginia Squires
- Playoffs MVP: Zelmo Beaty, Utah Stars
- All-Star Game MVP: Mel Daniels, Indiana Pacers
- **All-ABA First Team**
  - Roger Brown, Indiana Pacers (1st First Team selection, 3rd overall selection)
  - Rick Barry, New York Nets (3rd selection)
  - Mel Daniels, Indiana Pacers (4th selection)
  - Mack Calvin, The Floridians
  - Charlie Scott, Virginia Squires
- **All-ABA Second Team**
  - John Brisker, Pittsburgh Condors
  - Joe Caldwell, Carolina Cougars
  - Zelmo Beaty, Utah Stars (tied with Issel)
  - Dan Issel, Kentucky Colonels (tied with Beaty)
  - Donnie Freeman, Texas Chaparrals (3rd selection)
  - Larry Cannon, Denver Rockets
- **All-ABA Rookie Team**
  - Joe Hamilton, Texas Chaparrals
  - Dan Issel, Kentucky Colonels
  - Wendell Ladner, Memphis Pros
  - Samuel Robinson, The Floridians
  - Charlie Scott, Virginia Squires
