= Glen Combs =

American basketball player

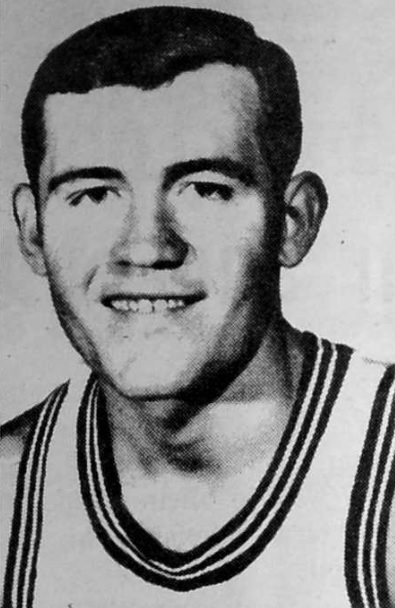
- Combs, circa 1970

Personal information
- Born: October 30, 1946 (age 79) Hazard, Kentucky, U.S.
- Listed height: 6 ft 2 in (1.88 m)
- Listed weight: 185 lb (84 kg)

Career information
- High school: Carr Creek (Carr Creek, Kentucky)
- College: Virginia Tech (1965–1968)
- NBA draft: 1968: 5th round, 51st overall pick
- Drafted by: San Diego Rockets
- Position: Point guard / shooting guard
- Number: 10, 40, 20

Career history
- 1968–1971: Dallas/Texas Chaparrals
- 1971–1974: Utah Stars
- 1974: Memphis Tams
- 1974–1975: Virginia Squires

Career highlights
- ABA champion (1971); 3× ABA All-Star (1970–1972)
- Stats at Basketball Reference

Glen Courtney Combs (born October 30, 1946, in Hazard, Kentucky) is an American former basketball player who played seven seasons in the American Basketball Association (ABA).

A 6'2" guard from Virginia Tech, Combs was nicknamed "The Kentucky Rifle" for his long-range shooting. He was drafted by the National Basketball Association's San Diego Rockets in 1968, although he never played for them, opting to spend his entire career in the rival American Basketball Association after being drafted by the Dallas Chaparrals in the 1968 ABA draft. Combs was a member of the Dallas/Texas Chaparrals, the Utah Stars, the Memphis Tams, and the Virginia Squires, and he appeared in three league All-star games (1970, 1971, 1972). The Utah Stars won an ABA Championship in 1971 when Combs was as a member of the team. He led the league in three-point baskets made (103) in 1971–72. When he retired in 1975, he had scored 7,666 career points.

Combs played college basketball at Virginia Tech. As a junior, he led the 1966–67 team to the Elite Eight, with a scoring average of 21.3 points per game. As of 2019 he holds the school record for points in an NCAA tournament game when he put up 29 in the Sweet 16 game against Indiana. In his senior season, he averaged 20.9 points per game, ending his career with a 17.9 scoring average in three varsity seasons. He was elected to the Virginia Tech Sports Hall of Fame in 1987.
