= Utah Stars =

- Conference: None
- Division: Western
- Founded: 1967
- Dissolved: 1975
- History: Anaheim Amigos; 1967–1968; Los Angeles Stars; 1968–1970; Utah Stars; 1970–1975
- Arena: The Salt Palace
- Location: Salt Lake City, Utah
- Team colors: Red, white & blue
- Team manager: Vince Boryla 1970–1972; Arnie Ferrin 1972–1975; Bill Orwig 1975
- Head coach: Bill Sharman; 1970–1971; LaDell Andersen; 1971–1973; Joe Mullaney; 1973–1974; Bucky Buckwalter & Tom Nissalke; 1974–1975; Tom Nissalke; 1975
- Ownership: Bill Daniels; 1970–1974; James A. Collier; 1974–1975; Snellen M. Johnson and Lyle E. Johnson; 1975
- Championships: 1 (1971)
- Division titles: 3 (1972, 1973, 1974)

The Utah Stars were an American Basketball Association (ABA) team based in Salt Lake City, Utah. Under head coach Bill Sharman the Stars were the first major professional basketball team to use a pre-game shootaround.

== History ==
=== Prior to moving to Utah (1967–1970) ===
The team was founded as the Anaheim Amigos, a charter member of the ABA based in Anaheim, California. They played at the Anaheim Convention Center. The team's colors were orange and black. The Anaheim Amigos were founded by Art Kim, a Hawaii native who had long been active in basketball as a player, Amateur Athletic Union administrator, and owner. The Amigos lost the very first ABA game to Oakland, 132–129. They finished their first season with 25 wins and 53 losses, good for fifth place in the Western Division but not good enough to make the playoffs.

The Amigos lost $500,000 in their first season, largely due to poor attendance; they only averaged 1,500 fans per game in a 7,500-seat arena. Kim realized he did not have the resources to keep going and sold the team to construction company owner Jim Kirst, who moved the team as the Los Angeles Stars in 1968 and played at the Los Angeles Memorial Sports Arena in Los Angeles. The franchise made an attempt to sign legendary center Wilt Chamberlain, but in the end he did not sign with the Stars. With 33 wins and 45 losses, the Stars improved from their first season but again finished fifth in the Western Division and did not make the playoffs.

In October 1969 the Stars signed Zelmo Beaty away from the NBA's Atlanta Hawks, but Beaty had to sit out the season due to a one-year option held by the Hawks, which the Stars would not buy out for $75,000. First year players Mack Calvin and Willie Wise signed with the Stars. The Stars finished fourth in the Western Division with a record of 43–41, earning the first winning season in franchise history and a playoff berth. The Stars defeated the Dallas Chaparrals 4 games to 2 in the Western Division semifinals and bested the Denver Rockets 4 games to 1 in the semifinals before losing the ABA championship series 4 games to 2 to the Indiana Pacers. Kirst had not anticipated the fast turnaround, and did not book the Sports Arena for several dates. They had to play several first and second-round games in their old home in Anaheim, as well as at the Long Beach Sports Arena in Long Beach. This turned out to be their final game as the Los Angeles Stars.

=== Moving to Utah (1970–71) ===
Despite a promising young roster, the Stars were more or less an afterthought in a market whose first choices were the Los Angeles Lakers and UCLA Bruins; they only averaged 2,500 fans per game. In March 1970, Kirst sold the team to Colorado cable TV pioneer Bill Daniels, who moved the team in June to Salt Lake City as the Utah Stars for the 1970–71 season. Beaty suited up for the team and they finished second in the Western Division with their best record yet at 57–27 (.679), one game behind the Indiana Pacers.

The Stars swept the Texas Chaparrals in four games in the first round of the playoffs, beat Indiana in seven games in a fiercely contested semifinal series, and edged out the Kentucky Colonels in seven games for the ABA championship. To date, this is Utah's only pro basketball championship.

=== 1971–72 season ===
The Stars won their first division championship, winning the Western Division with a record of 60–24. The Stars defeated the Dallas Chaparrals 4 games to none in the Western Division semifinals before falling to the Indiana Pacers in the Western Division finals, 4 games to 3.

=== 1972–73 season ===
The Stars hosted the ABA All-Star Game and again won the Western Division, with a record of 55–29. The Stars defeated the San Diego Conquistadors 4 games to none in the Western Division semifinals but lost in the Western Division finals 4 games to 2 to the Indiana Pacers.

=== 1973–1974 season ===
In 1973–74 the Stars finished with a record of 51–33 and won first place in the ABA's Western Division for the third straight year under new coach Joe Mullaney. It was the Stars' third straight Western Division title. In the playoffs the Stars again defeated the San Diego Conquistadors in the Western Division semifinals, this time 4 games to 2, and went on to defeat the Indiana Pacers 4 games to 3 in the Western Division finals to reach the ABA Finals for the 2nd time in four seasons. However, the Stars lost the championship to the New York Nets 4 games to 1.

=== 1974–75 season ===
This was the Stars' final full ABA season. Daniels was almost broke due to a series of failed business ventures and an unsuccessful run for governor of Colorado. One of the casualties of the team's financial woes was Mullaney, who resigned after being told the team could not afford to meet his contract. Daniels sold the team to Salt Lake City businessman James A. Collier in August 1974, but Collier was forced to relinquish the team to Daniels two weeks later after missing a payment. The Stars made a high-profile personnel move that season by signing high school player Moses Malone to play for them. The Stars finished the season in fourth place in the Western Division and lost in the first round of the playoffs to the Denver Nuggets, 4 games to 1.

=== 1975–76 season ===
During the preseason, the Stars (and the Virginia Squires) failed to make payments required as a guarantee for hosting the NBA's Chicago Bulls in one of the common ABA vs. NBA preseason exhibition games. Daniels sold the team again to Snellen and Lyle Johnson in May, but they relinquished the team to Daniels just before the season after missing several payments.

However, Daniels was almost completely broke by this time. An attempt to negotiate a "merger" with the Spirits of St. Louis fell by the wayside. As a result, on December 2, 1975, the league canceled the Stars franchise for missing payroll. Four of their players (including Moses Malone) were sold to the Spirits of St. Louis, with Daniels getting a 10% minority stake in the Spirits as well. A fifth player was sold to the Virginia Squires. Daniels ultimately paid back all of the season ticket holders at eight percent interest.

The Stars are widely considered one of the most successful teams in ABA history. They were also known for having some of the best fan support in the ABA, even up until the team folded in 1975. From 1970 to 1975, the Stars went 265–171 (.608), which was the best winning percentage of any team that played more than one season in the league.

=== Aftermath ===
Despite the Stars' demise, Salt Lake City had proven it could support big-time professional basketball. With this in mind, in 1976 the owners of the Spirits of St. Louis announced that they were moving the team to Utah for the 1976–1977 ABA season, to play as the Utah Rockies. However, this was undone when the ABA–NBA merger closed in June 1976 and the Spirits and the Kentucky Colonels were the only two teams left out of the merged league. (The Virginia Squires were folded shortly after the end of the regular season due to their inability to make good on a required league assessment, though there was no chance of them being part of a merger deal in any event.)

Professional basketball finally returned to Salt Lake City when the New Orleans Jazz of the National Basketball Association (NBA) relocated there in 1979. The Jazz have played in Salt Lake City ever since. Of the three ABA teams that were left out of the ABA–NBA merger, the Stars are the only one to have eventually been replaced by an NBA team.

== ABA championship ==
In their first season in Salt Lake City, the Stars dominated their way to a 57–27 record and a 2nd-place finish in the Western Division standings, a game behind the Indiana Pacers. In the Western Division semifinals, the Stars would go on to sweep the Texas Chaparrals and then stunned the Pacers in game 7 of the Western Division finals, earning a spot in the ABA championship.

The Stars would face the Kentucky Colonels in the ABA championship. In game one a near-capacity crowd filed into the Salt Palace to watch the Stars defeat Kentucky 136–117. The Stars set an ABA playoff record by scoring 50 points in the 2nd quarter. In game 2, the series continued its high scoring with the Stars beating Kentucky 138–125. The series shifted to Louisville and Kentucky took games 3 and 4, tying the series up at 2–2. The series then returned to Salt Lake City, where the Stars beat Kentucky 137–127, taking a 3–2 series lead. The Stars looked to wrap up the ABA championship with a game 6 victory in Louisville. However, Kentucky barely beat the Stars 105–102, sending the series to a decisive seventh game back in Salt Lake City.

With the ABA championship on the line, an ABA record crowd of 13,260 packed into the Salt Palace to watch game 7 of the 1971 ABA championship. The game remained close throughout, however the Stars pulled away late, winning the 1971 ABA championship 131–121. As the game ended, hundreds of Stars fans rushed the court, lifting players onto their shoulders in a jubilant celebration. The actions were a total surprise to Stars officials, as they had not anticipated such a reaction from the fans.

== Utah Stars vs. NBA teams ==
The ABA teams frequently played exhibition games in the preseason vs. NBA teams. While the ABA overall had a winning record vs. the NBA in head to head competition, the Stars had an overall record of 7–9 against NBA teams.

The Stars' first game against the NBA was a 96–89 loss at home to the New York Knicks on September 28, 1971. The Stars lost their first four games against NBA teams, earning their first win against that league with a win against the Seattle SuperSonics in Honolulu, Hawaii, on September 24, 1972.

Other Stars wins against the NBA include defeating the Boston Celtics at home on October 4, 1973 (part of a double-header in which 12,431 Utah fans also saw the ABA's Denver Rockets defeat the NBA's Phoenix Suns 113-111 prior to the Stars' win); a home win against the Kansas City-Omaha Kings on October 8, 1974; a home win against the SuperSonics on October 7, 1975; a win against the Kings on October 11, 1975, in Denver as part of a double-header in which 17,018 fans saw the Denver Nuggets lose to the NBA's Golden State Warriors 115–100; and a 118–108 road win against the SuperSonics in Seattle on October 15, 1975.

In the very last game ever played between ABA and NBA teams, the Stars defeated the Milwaukee Bucks 106–101 in Salt Lake City on October 21, 1975. (In the penultimate ABA vs. NBA matchup, the ABA's Kentucky Colonels defeated the Washington Bullets 121–111 two nights prior.)

== Notable players ==
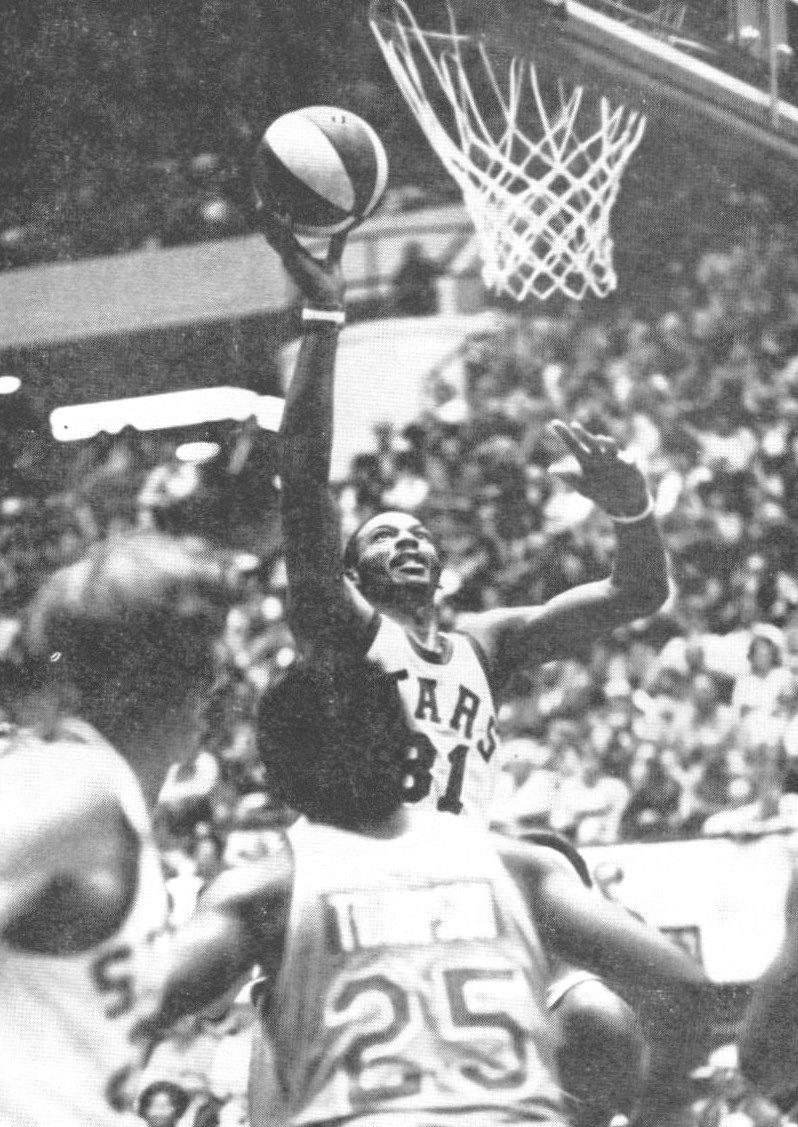
Zelmo Beaty won the ABA Playoffs Most Valuable Player Award after leading the Stars to the 1971 ABA title.

- Zelmo Beaty
- Ron Boone
- Jimmy Jones
- Moses Malone
- Rick Mount
- Willie Wise

=== Basketball Hall of Famers ===
Utah Stars Hall of Famers
Players
No.	Name	Position	Tenure	Inducted
22	Moses Malone	C	1974–1975	2001
35	Roger Brown	F/G	1974–1975	2013
31	Zelmo Beaty	F/C	1970–1974	2016
Coaches
Name		Position	Tenure	Inducted
Bill Sharman		Head coach	1968–1971	2004
Del Harris		Assistant coach	1975–1976	2022

== Season-by-season ==
ABA champions	ABA finalists	Division champions	Playoff berth

Season	League	Division	Finish	W	L	Win%	Playoffs	Awards
Anaheim Amigos
1967–68	ABA	Western	5th	25	53	.321	—	—
Los Angeles Stars
1968–69	ABA	Western	5th	33	45	.423	—	—
1969–70	ABA	Western	4th	43	41	.512	Won Division Semifinals (Chaparrals) 4–2; Won Division Finals (Rockets) 4–1; Lost ABA Finals (Pacers) 2–4	Bill Sharman (ABA COY)
Utah Stars
1970–71	ABA	Western	2nd	57	27	.679	Won Division Semifinals (Chaparrals) 4–0; Won Division Finals (Pacers) 4–3; Won ABA Finals (Colonels) 4–3	Zelmo Beaty (Playoffs MVP)
1971–72	ABA	Western	1st	60	24	.714	Won Division Semifinals (Chaparrals) 4–0; Lost Division Finals (Pacers) 3–4	—
1972–73	ABA	Western	1st	55	29	.655	Won Division Semifinals (Conquistadors) 4–0; Lost Division Finals (Pacers) 3–4	—
1973–74	ABA	Western	1st	51	33	.607	Won Division Semifinals (Conquistadors) 4–2; Won Division Finals (Pacers) 4–3; Lost ABA Finals (Nets) 1–4	Joe Mullaney (ABA COY)
1974–75	ABA	Western	4th	38	46	.452	Lost Division Semifinals (Nuggets) 2–4	—
1975–76	ABA			4	12	.250	Did not qualify	(team folded)
