= Rich Niemann =

American basketball player

Personal information
- Born: July 2, 1946 (age 80) St. Louis, Missouri, U.S.
- Listed height: 7 ft 0 in (2.13 m)
- Listed weight: 245 lb (111 kg)

Career information
- High school: DuBourg (St. Louis, Missouri)
- College: Saint Louis (1965–1968)
- NBA draft: 1968: 4th round, 42nd overall pick
- Drafted by: Detroit Pistons
- Playing career: 1968–1972
- Position: Center
- Number: 19, 20, 27, 52

Career history
- 1968–1969: Detroit Pistons
- 1969: Milwaukee Bucks
- 1969–1970: Boston Celtics
- 1970: Carolina Cougars
- 1970–1971: The Floridians
- 1971–1972: Dallas Chaparrals

Career highlights
- 2× First-team All-MVC (1967, 1968)

Career NBA/ABA statistics
- Points: 1,230
- Rebounds: 1,079
- Assists: 158
- Stats at NBA.com
- Stats at Basketball Reference

Richard W. Niemann (born July 2, 1946) is an American former basketball player who played at center in the National Basketball Association (NBA) and American Basketball Association (ABA). Niemann was originally drafted in the fourth round of the 1968 NBA draft by the Detroit Pistons. That season, he was traded from the Pistons to the Milwaukee Bucks along with cash for Dave Gambee. Later that year, he was claimed by the Boston Celtics after he was waived by the Bucks. After his time with the Celtics, he played the rest of his career in the American Basketball Association playing for the Carolina Cougars, the Miami Floridians, and the Dallas Chaparrals. Afterwards he taught chemistry and physics and coached baseball and basketball at several St. Louis area high schools for over 30 years.

== Career statistics ==
Legend
| GP | Games played | GS | Games started | MPG | Minutes per game |
| FG% | Field goal percentage | 3P% | 3-point field goal percentage | FT% | Free throw percentage |
| RPG | Rebounds per game | APG | Assists per game | SPG | Steals per game |
| BPG | Blocks per game | PPG | Points per game | **Bold** | Career high |

=== NBA ===
==== Regular season ====
| Year | Team | GP | GS | MPG | FG% | 3P% | FT% | RPG | APG | SPG | BPG | PPG |
|---|---|---|---|---|---|---|---|---|---|---|---|---|
| 1968–69 | Detroit | 16 | - | 7.7 | **.426** | - | .800 | 2.6 | **0.6** | - | - | 3.0 |
| 1968–69 | Milwaukee | **18** | - | **8.3** | .407 | - | .733 | **3.3** | 0.4 | - | - | **3.3** |
| 1969–70 | Boston | 6 | - | 3.0 | .400 | - | **1.000** | 1.0 | 0.3 | - | - | 1.0 |
| Career | | 40 | - | 7.3 | .414 | - | .778 | 2.7 | 0.5 | - | - | 2.8 |

=== ABA ===
==== Regular season ====
| Year | Team | GP | GS | MPG | FG% | 3P% | FT% | RPG | APG | SPG | BPG | PPG |
|---|---|---|---|---|---|---|---|---|---|---|---|---|
| 1969–70 | Carolina | **63** | - | **23.3** | .474 | .000 | .734 | **8.9** | **1.4** | - | - | **11.3** |
| 1970–71 | Floridians | 51 | - | 12.6 | **.502** | .000 | .717 | 5.0 | 0.6 | - | - | 5.6 |
| 1971–72 | Dallas | 33 | - | 15.9 | .490 | .000 | **.735** | 4.7 | 0.7 | - | - | 3.7 |
| Career | | 147 | - | 17.9 | .483 | .000 | .731 | 6.6 | 1.0 | - | - | 7.6 |

==== Playoffs ====
| Year | Team | GP | GS | MPG | FG% | 3P% | FT% | RPG | APG | SPG | BPG | PPG |
|---|---|---|---|---|---|---|---|---|---|---|---|---|
| 1969–70 | Carolina | **4** | - | **12.8** | .375 | .000 | **1.000** | **3.0** | **0.5** | - | - | **3.8** |
| 1970–71 | Floridians | 1 | - | 2.0 | **.500** | .000 | .000 | 0.0 | 0.0 | - | - | 2.0 |
| Career | | 5 | - | 10.6 | .389 | .000 | 1.000 | 2.4 | 0.4 | - | - | 3.4 |
