= George Peeples =

American basketball player

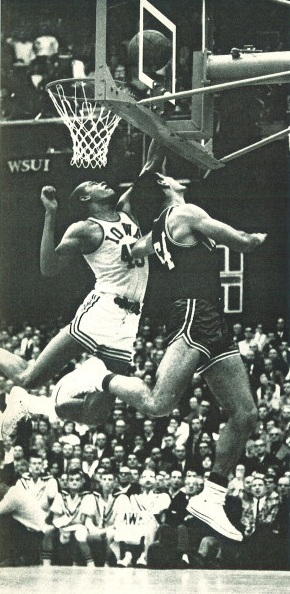
- Peeples (left) playing for the Iowa Hawkeyes c.1965

Personal information
- Born: October 30, 1943 (age 82) Georgia, U.S.
- Listed height: 6 ft 7 in (2.01 m)
- Listed weight: 190 lb (86 kg)

Career information
- High school: Ecorse (Ecorse, Michigan)
- College: Iowa (1963–1966)
- NBA draft: 1966: 4th round, 35th overall pick
- Drafted by: Baltimore Bullets
- Playing career: 1966–1973
- Position: Center
- Number: 43, 51, 15

Career history
- 1967–1969: Indiana Pacers
- 1969–1971: Carolina Cougars
- 1971–1972: Dallas Chaparrals
- 1972–1973: Indiana Pacers
- Stats at Basketball Reference

George Peeples (born October 30, 1943) is an American former professional basketball player.

A 6'7" forward/center, Peeples played at the University of Iowa during the 1960s. He twice led the Iowa Hawkeyes in rebounds, grabbing 10.4 per game in 1964–65, and 10.8 per game in 1965–66. After his college playing days were over, Peeples was drafted in 1966 on the 4th round (35th overall pick) by the Baltimore Bullets, but he never played in the NBA.

From 1967 to 1973, Peeples played professionally in the American Basketball Association as a member of the Indiana Pacers, Carolina Cougars, and Dallas Chaparrals. He averaged 8.1 points per game and 7.3 rebounds per game over his ABA career.

== Career statistics ==
Legend
GP	Games played	GS	Games started	MPG	Minutes per game
FG%	Field goal percentage	3P%	3-point field goal percentage	FT%	Free throw percentage
RPG	Rebounds per game	APG	Assists per game	SPG	Steals per game
BPG	Blocks per game	PPG	Points per game	**Bold**	Career high
*	Led the league

=== ABA ===
==== Regular season ====
Year	Team	GP	MPG	FG%	3P%	FT%	RPG	APG	PPG
1967–68	Indiana	65	18.5	.407	.000	.612	5.8	.4	6.0
1968–69	Indiana	64	17.4	.439	–	**.711**	5.6	.5	5.4
1969–70	Carolina	**83**	26.7	.409	.000	.663	8.3	**1.5**	9.2
1970–71	Carolina	82	**27.1**	**.488**	.000	.603	**9.4**	1.3	**11.7**
1971–72	Dallas	6	20.8	.440	–	.636	5.8	.8	4.8
1972–73	Indiana	9	6.2	.286	–	.545	1.7	.4	1.6
All-Star		309	22.4	.441	.000	.639	7.3	1.0	8.1

==== Playoffs ====
Year	Team	GP	MPG	FG%	3P%	FT%	RPG	APG	PPG
1968	Indiana	3	20.7	**.571**	–	.667	10.3	**1.3**	8.7
1969	Indiana	**17***	24.6	.395	.000	.667	6.8	.6	6.0
1970	Carolina	4	**31.5**	.357	–	.692	**13.5**	1.0	**9.8**
Career		24	25.3	.410	.000	.671	8.4	.8	7.0
