= 1969–70 Carolina Cougars season =

ABA basketball team season

- Head coach: Bones McKinney
- Owner: James Carson Gardner
- Arena: Greensboro Coliseum; Charlotte Coliseum; Dorton Arena

Results
- Record: 42–42 (.500)
- Place: Division: 3rd
- Playoff finish: Lost in Division Semifinals
- Radio: WSOC

The 1969–70 Carolina Cougars season was the 1st season of the Cougars in the ABA. Late in the spring of 1969, the Houston Mavericks had been bought by the Southern Sports Corporation (headed by James C. Gardner) for $350,000. After the season finished, the team moved to North Carolina, which at the time had no professional teams. The Cougars played in three areas in the state: Greensboro, Charlotte, and Raleigh, making this the first regional franchise in the ABA. The first game of the Cougars was on October 8, 1969, when the Cougars played the Dallas Chaparrals at Greensboro Coliseum, with Carolina winning 108–97. The team finished 3rd in the six team Eastern Division. While they finished last in average points scored per game (106.8), they were 1st in points allowed per game (107). In the Playoffs, the Cougars faced off against the Indiana Pacers (with Game 3 being played in Charlotte and Game 4 played in Raleigh), but the Cougars lost the series in four games.

During the regular season, the Cougars played 20 games in Greensboro, 14 in Charlotte, and 8 in Raleigh; in the playoffs, the team played once in Charlotte, and once in Raleigh.

== Roster ==
1969–70 Carolina Cougars roster
Players

Pos.	No.	Player	Height	Weight	DOB	From
SF	42	Bill Bunting	6 ft 8 in (2.03 m)	200 lb (91 kg)	1947-08-26	North Carolina
SG	24	Calvin Fowler	6 ft 0 in (1.83 m)	175 lb (79 kg)	February 11, 1940	Saint Francis (PA)
SG	33	Steve Kramer	6 ft 5 in (1.96 m)	200 lb (91 kg)	1945-01-01	BYU
PG	23	Gene Littles	6 ft 0 in (1.83 m)	160 lb (73 kg)	June 29, 1943	High Point
SF	35	Randolph Mahaffey	6 ft 7 in (2.01 m)	210 lb (95 kg)	September 28, 1945	Clemson
SG	44	Larry Miller	6 ft 4 in (1.93 m)	190 lb (86 kg)	1946-04-04	North Carolina
SF	34	Doug Moe	6 ft 5 in (1.96 m)	215 lb (98 kg)	September 21, 1938	North Carolina
C	52	Rich Niemann	7 ft 0 in (2.13 m)	245 lb (111 kg)	July 2, 1946	Saint Louis
C	43	George Peeples	6 ft 7 in (2.01 m)	190 lb (86 kg)	October 30, 1943	Iowa
PG	21	Ron Perry	6 ft 3 in (1.91 m)	190 lb (86 kg)	December 29, 1943	Virginia Tech
C	52	George Sutor	6 ft 8 in (2.03 m)	235 lb (107 kg)	September 14, 1943	La Salle
SG	11	Bob Verga	6 ft 1 in (1.85 m)	190 lb (86 kg)	September 7, 1945	Duke
F	13	Hank Whitney	6 ft 7 in (2.01 m)	230 lb (104 kg)	1939-04-28	Iowa State

Coaches
Head coach
- Bones McKinney

Legend
- (DP) Unsigned draft pick
- (FA) Free agent
- (S) Suspended
- Injured

Roster

== Final standings ==
=== Eastern Division ===
Team	W	L	PCT.	GB
Indiana Pacers	59	25	.702	-
Kentucky Colonels	45	39	.536	14.0
Carolina Cougars	42	42	.500	17.0
New York Nets	39	45	.464	20.0
Pittsburgh Pipers	29	55	.345	30.0
Miami Floridians	23	61	.274	36.0

== ABA Playoffs ==
1970 playoff game log
ABA Eastern Division Semifinals: 0–4 (home: 0–2; road: 0–2)

Game	Date	Team	Score	High points	High rebounds	High assists	Location Attendance	Series
1	April 18	@ Indiana	L 105–123	Bob Verga (19)	Randy Mahaffey (9)	Doug Moe (6)	Indiana State Fairgrounds Coliseum; 6,123	0–1
2	April 19	@ Indiana	L 98–103	Bob Verga (35)	Hank Whitney (11)	Calvin Fowler (4)	Indiana State Fairgrounds Coliseum; 6,341	0–2
3	April 22	Indiana	L 106–115	Bob Verga (24)	George Peeples (22)	Doug Moe (8)	Charlotte Coliseum; 3,381	0–3
4	April 24	Indiana	L 106–110	Bob Verga (30)	George Peeples (18)	Doug Moe (8)	Dorton Arena; 5,211	0–4

1968 schedule

== Awards, records, and honors ==
1970 ABA All-Star Game played on January 24, 1970

- Doug Moe
- Bob Verga
