= Randolph Mahaffey =

American basketball player (born 1945)

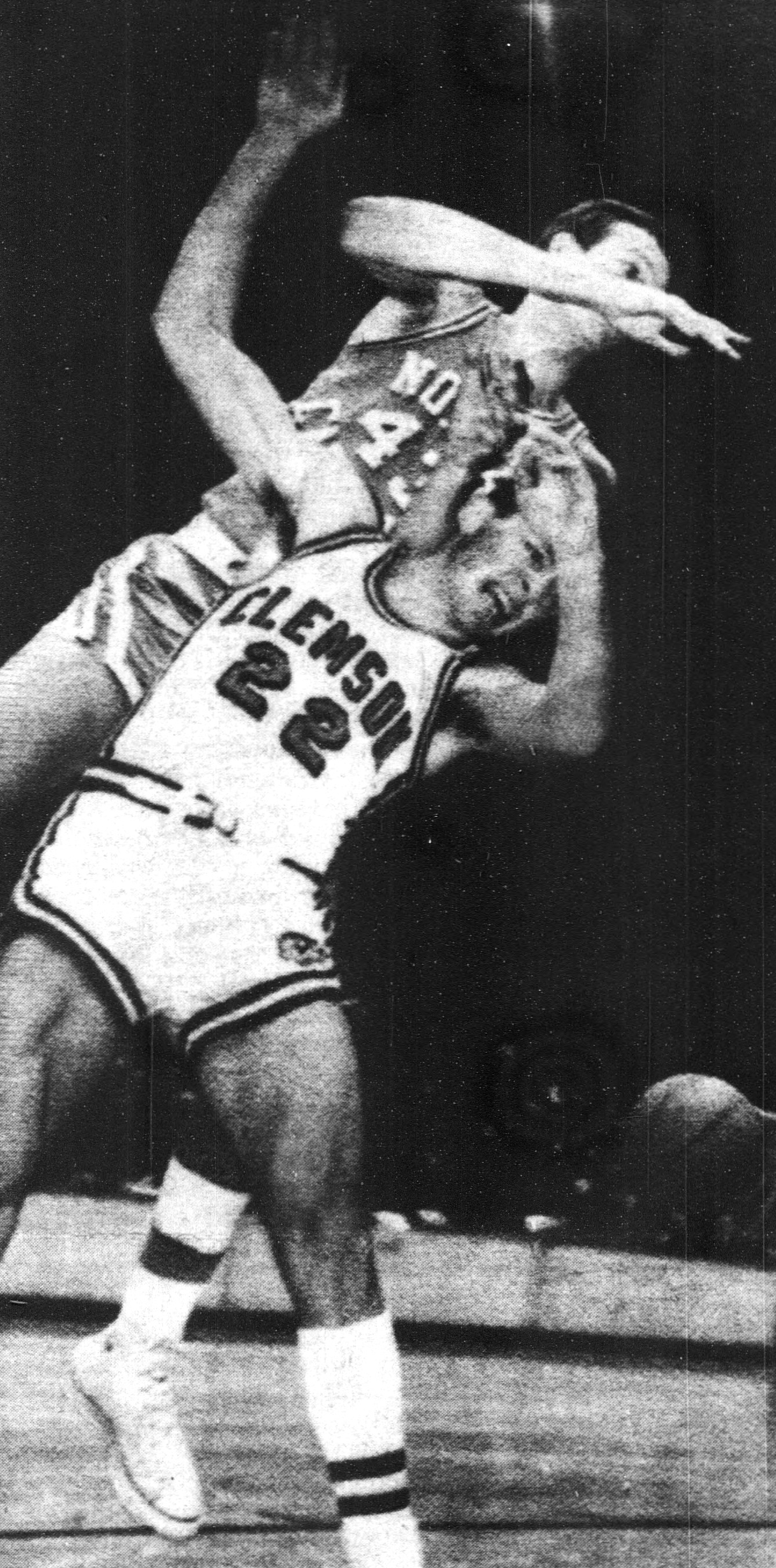
- Mahaffey (front, number 22) guards North Carolina Tar Heels center Rusty Clark during a game on February 19, 1967.

Personal information
- Born: September 28, 1945 (age 81) LaGrange, Georgia, U.S.
- Listed height: 6 ft 7 in (2.01 m)
- Listed weight: 210 lb (95 kg)

Career information
- High school: LaGrange (LaGrange, Georgia)
- College: Clemson (1964–1967)
- NBA draft: 1967: 2nd round, 16th overall pick
- Drafted by: Los Angeles Lakers
- Playing career: 1967–1971
- Position: Power forward / small forward
- Number: 25, 20, 35

Career history
- 1967–1968: Kentucky Colonels
- 1968–1969: New York Nets
- 1969–1971: Carolina Cougars

Career highlights
- ABA All-Star (1968); First-team All-ACC (1967); Second-team All-ACC (1965)

Career ABA statistics
- Points: 3,815 (11.9 ppg)
- Rebounds: 2,554 (8.0 rpg)
- Assists: 507 (1.6 apg)
- Stats at Basketball Reference

Randolph Mahaffey (born September 28, 1945) is an American former professional basketball player.

A 6'7" forward born in LaGrange, Georgia, Mahaffey played college basketball for the Clemson Tigers. Mahaffey was one of four brothers (Don, Ronnie and Richie are the others) who played for Clemson between 1959 and 1970. They marked the first time in Atlantic Coast Conference (ACC) history that four brothers played for the same program.

The Los Angeles Lakers selected him with the fourth pick of the second round of the 1967 NBA draft (16th overall pick) and the Kentucky Colonels of the American Basketball Association also drafted him. Mahaffey signed with the American Basketball Association's Colonels.

In his rookie season with the Colonels, Mahaffey scored over 1,000 points and was an ABA All-Star.

On December 30, 1968, the Colonels traded Mahaffey and Manny Leaks to the New York Nets for Oliver Darden and Andy Anderson.

On June 12, 1969, the Nets traded Mahaffey to the Carolina Cougars in return for a draft pick. Mahaffey played with the Cougars through the 1971–72 season.

Mahaffey appeared in the 1968 ABA Playoffs with the Colonels and in the 1970 ABA Playoffs with the Cougars. He averaged 13 points a game in the 1968 playoffs and 12 points a game in the 1970 playoffs, but both of his teams exited after the first round. The Colonels were edged 3–2 by the Minnesota Muskies in the 1968 Eastern Division Semifinals and the Cougars were ousted in the 1970 Eastern Division Semifinals by the Indiana Pacers, 4–0.

Mahaffey averaged 11.9 points per game and 8.0 rebounds per game in his professional basketball career.

Randy Mahaffey's grandson Trent Steinour, a 6'10 Power Forward from Lake Norman High School, has committed to play at Clemson University beginning in the 25/26 season, he is the son of Randy's daughter, Lee Mahaffey Steinour.

== Career statistics ==
Legend
GP	Games played	GS	Games started	MPG	Minutes per game
FG%	Field goal percentage	3P%	3-point field goal percentage	FT%	Free throw percentage
RPG	Rebounds per game	APG	Assists per game	SPG	Steals per game
BPG	Blocks per game	PPG	Points per game	**Bold**	Career high
*	Led the league

=== ABA ===
==== Regular season ====
Year	Team	GP	MPG	FG%	3P%	FT%	RPG	APG	PPG
1967–68	Kentucky	75	31.0	.426	.000	.684	**9.1**	1.7	13.7
1968–69	Kentucky	31*	24.5	.405	.000	.673	5.9	1.1	8.8
1968–69	N.Y. Nets	48*	**33.2**	.432	.000	**.719**	8.1	1.3	**13.8**
1969–70	Carolina	**84***	30.5	.447	.000	.686	8.1	**2.0**	11.0
1970–71	Carolina	83	28.3	**.487**	.000	.653	7.4	1.4	11.2
Career		321	29.9	.445	.000	.684	8.0	1.6	11.9
All-Star		1	7.0	.500	–	.333	4.0	.0	4.0

==== Playoffs ====
Year	Team	GP	MPG	FG%	3P%	FT%	RPG	APG	PPG
1968	Kentucky	**5**	**29.4**	.453	–	.708	4.6	.6	**13.0**
1970	Carolina	4	22.8	**.500**	–	**.714**	**6.8**	**2.0**	12.0
Career		9	26.4	.473	.000	.711	5.6	1.2	12.6
