= 1970 ABA playoffs =

Basketball competition

Tournament details
- Dates: April 17 – May 25, 1970
- Season: 1969–70
- Teams: 8

Final positions
- Champions: Indiana Pacers (1st title)
- Runners-up: Los Angeles Stars
- Semifinalists: Kentucky Colonels; Denver Rockets

The 1970 ABA playoffs was the postseason tournament of the American Basketball Association's 1969–70 season. The tournament concluded with the Eastern Division champion Indiana Pacers defeating the Western Division champion Los Angeles Stars, four games to two in the ABA Finals.

The Indiana Pacers finished the season with the league's best regular season record (59–25, .702) before going on to win the ABA championship. This same feat was accomplished by the Oakland Oaks during the prior season and by the Pittsburgh Pipers in the year before that.

The Pacers became the first ABA champions to return in the same form for the following season. The Oakland Oaks became the Washington Caps for the 1969–1970 ABA season; the Pittsburgh Pipers had become the Minnesota Pipers after winning the ABA championship the prior season.

For the first time in league history, a player scored 50 points in a playoff game, with Rick Barry scoring 52 in the Game 7 loss in the first round. Roger Brown of Indiana was the Most Valuable Player of the ABA playoffs. Brown averaged 28.5 points, 3rd best among all postseason players to go along with playing 46.2 minutes per game (2nd) while going 151-of-318 in field goal attempts (3rd best in each category). He scored 53 points in Game 4 of the ABA Finals on May 19 to set record for a playoff game.

== Bracket ==
Division Semifinals
1	Denver Rockets	4
3	Washington Caps	3
Western Division
4	Los Angeles Stars	4
2	Dallas Chaparrals	2
1	Indiana Pacers	4
3	Carolina Cougars	0
Eastern Division
4	New York Nets	3
2	Kentucky Colonels	4

Division Finals
1	Denver Rockets	1
4	Los Angeles Stars	4
1	Indiana Pacers	4
2	Kentucky Colonels	1

ABA Finals
W4	Los Angeles Stars	2
E1	Indiana Pacers	4

== Division Semifinals ==
=== Western Division Semifinals ===
==== (1) Denver Rockets vs. (3) Washington Caps ====
April 17

Box score

Washington Caps 111, Denver Rockets 130
Scoring by quarter: 33–25, 32–42, 28–32, 18–31
Pts: Rick Barry 40; Rebs: George Carter 10	Pts: Larry Jones 33; Rebs: Spencer Haywood 15
Denver leads series, 1–0

Denver Auditorium Arena, Denver, Colorado
Attendance: 9,822

April 18

Box score

Washington Caps 133, Denver Rockets 143
Scoring by quarter: 32–26, 33–44, 30–37, 38–36
Pts: Rick Barry 36; Rebs: Fatty Taylor 9	Pts: Larry Jones 32; Rebs: Spencer Haywood 17
Denver leads series, 2–0

Denver Auditorium Arena, Denver, Colorado
Attendance: 9,889

April 19

Box score

Denver Rockets 120, Washington Caps 125
Scoring by quarter: 24–36, 33–25, 28–32, 35–32
Pts: Spencer Haywood 45; Rebs: Spencer Haywood 26	Pts: Rick Barry 45; Rebs: Ira Harge 17
Denver leads series, 2–1

Washington Coliseum, Washington, D.C.
Attendance: 1,748

April 22

Box score

Denver Rockets 114, Washington Caps 131
Scoring by quarter: 27–34, 24–32, 34–27, 29–38
Pts: Spencer Haywood 41; Rebs: Spencer Haywood 21	Pts: Barry, Barrett 30 each Rebs: Ira Harge 13
Series tied, 2–2

Washington Coliseum, Washington, D.C.
Attendance: 5,497

April 23

Box score

Washington Caps 110, Denver Rockets 132
Scoring by quarter: 28–33, 28–34, 22–26, 32–39
Pts: Rick Barry 38; Rebs: Rick Barry 17	Pts: Spencer Haywood 38; Rebs: Spencer Haywood 20
Denver leads series, 3–2

Denver Auditorium Arena, Denver, Colorado
Attendance: 7,141

April 25

Box score

Denver Rockets 111, Washington Caps 116
Scoring by quarter: 26–31, 29–24, 32–27, 24–34
Pts: Larry Jones 30; Rebs: Spencer Haywood 21	Pts: Rick Barry 40; Rebs: Ira Harge 24
Series tied, 3–3

Washington Coliseum, Washington, D.C.
Attendance: 3,186

April 28

Box score

Washington Caps 119, Denver Rockets 143
Scoring by quarter: 31–37, 28–30, 27–38, 33–38
Pts: Rick Barry 52; Rebs: Ira Harge 19	Pts: Spencer Haywood 42; Rebs: Spencer Haywood 18
Denver wins series, 4–3

Denver Auditorium Arena, Denver, Colorado
Attendance: 9,893

Rick Barry set a new ABA record for points in a postseason game with 52, but the Rockets dominated the Caps with a third quarter that saw their lead go from eight to nearly twenty.

==== (2) Dallas Chaparrals vs. (4) Los Angeles Stars ====
April 17

Box score

Los Angeles Stars 115, Dallas Chaparrals 103
Scoring by quarter: 27–19, 29–25, 30–31, 29–28
Pts: Bob Warren 21; Rebs: Craig Raymond 18; Asts: Bob Warren 6	Pts: Glen Combs 33; Rebs: Manny Leaks 21; Asts: Maurice McHartley 5
Los Angeles leads series, 1–0

Moody Coliseum, University Park, Texas
Attendance: 4,513

April 18

Box score

Los Angeles Stars 121, Dallas Chaparrals 129
Scoring by quarter: 28–38, 30–32, 29–25, 34–34
Pts: Mack Calvin 29; Rebs: Trooper Washington 13; Asts: Mack Calvin 6	Pts: Glen Combs 24; Rebs: Cincy Powell 14; Asts: Cincy Powell 7
Series tied, 1–1

Moody Coliseum, University Park, Texas
Attendance: 4,764

April 20

Box score

Dallas Chaparrals 116, Los Angeles Stars 104
Scoring by quarter: 21–28, 32–20, 37–23, 26–33
Pts: Ron Boone 22; Rebs: Cincy Powell 18; Asts: Glen Combs 7	Pts: Mack Calvin 28; Rebs: Stone, Raymond 12 each Asts: Mack Calvin 7
Dallas leads series, 2–1

Los Angeles Memorial Sports Arena, Los Angeles, California
Attendance: 971

April 22

Box score

Dallas Chaparrals 138, Los Angeles Stars 144
Scoring by quarter: 23–32, 33–37, 38–41, 44–34
Pts: John Beasley 28; Rebs: Cincy Powell 13; Asts: Combs, McHartley 6 each	Pts: Mack Calvin 44; Rebs: Craig Raymond 28; Asts: Mack Calvin 16
Series tied, 2–2

Anaheim Convention Center, Anaheim, California
Attendance: 2,921

April 24

Box score

Los Angeles Stars 146, Dallas Chaparrals 139
Scoring by quarter: 33–37, 27–33, 39–21, 47–48
Pts: Mack Calvin 38; Rebs: Craig Raymond 18; Asts: Mack Calvin 11	Pts: Glen Combs 32; Rebs: Cincy Powell 15; Asts: Charlie Beasley 8
Los Angeles leads series, 3–2

Moody Coliseum, University Park, Texas
Attendance: 5,128

April 26

Box score

Dallas Chaparrals 123, Los Angeles Stars 124
Scoring by quarter: 33–30, 32–33, 34–36, 24–25
Pts: Manny Leaks 32; Rebs: Manny Leaks 20; Asts: Combs, Boone 6 each	Pts: Mack Calvin 27; Rebs: Craig Raymond 19; Asts: Mack Calvin 7
Los Angeles wins series, 4–2

Long Beach Arena, Long Beach, California
Attendance: 2,083

=== Eastern Division Semifinals ===
==== (1) Indiana Pacers vs. (3) Carolina Cougars ====
April 18

Boxscore

Carolina Cougars 105, Indiana Pacers 123
Scoring by quarter: 22–27, 24–36, 27–31, 32–29
Pts: Bob Verga 19; Rebs: Randy Mahaffey 9 Asts: Doug Moe 6	Pts: Freddie Lewis 29; Rebs: Mel Daniels 17; Asts: Roger Brown 7
Indiana leads series, 1–0

Indiana State Fairgrounds Coliseum, Indianapolis, Indiana
Attendance: 6,123

April 19

Boxscore

Carolina Cougars 98, Indiana Pacers 103
Scoring by quarter: 14–20, 26–31, 26–27, 32–25
Pts: Bob Verga 35; Rebs: Hank Whitney 11; Asts: Calvin Fowler 4	Pts: Freddie Lewis 26; Rebs: Mel Daniels 21; Asts: Freddie Lewis 6
Indiana leads series, 2–0

Indiana State Fairgrounds Coliseum, Indianapolis, Indiana
Attendance: 6,341

April 22

Boxscore

Indiana Pacers 115, Carolina Cougars 106
Scoring by quarter: 19–26, 34–27, 24–29, 38–24
Pts: John Barnhill 25; Rebs: Mel Daniels 16; Asts: Roger Brown 6	Pts: Bob Verga 24; Rebs: George Peeples 22; Asts: Doug Moe 8
Indiana leads series, 3–0

Charlotte Coliseum, Charlotte, North Carolina
Attendance: 3,381

April 24

Boxscore

Indiana Pacers 110, Carolina Cougars 106
Scoring by quarter: 30–28, 26–29, 30–29, 24–20
Pts: Freddie Lewis 31; Rebs: Mel Daniels 15; Asts: Freddie Lewis 6	Pts: Bob Verga 30; Rebs: George Peeples 18; Asts: Doug Moe 8
Indiana wins series, 4–0

Dorton Arena, Raleigh, North Carolina
Attendance: 5,211

==== (2) Kentucky Colonels vs. (4) New York Nets ====
April 17

Box score

New York Nets 122, Kentucky Colonels 118 (OT)
Scoring by quarter: 22–29, 25–19, 36–29, 26–32, Overtime: 13–9
Pts: Levern Tart 46; Rebs: Simon, Dove 13 each	Pts: Louie Dampier 25; Rebs: Gene Moore 13
New York leads series, 1–0

Louisville Convention Center, Louisville, Kentucky
Attendance: 2,105

April 18

Box score

New York Nets 111, Kentucky Colonels 113
Scoring by quarter: 25–32, 32–28, 21–28, 33–25
Pts: Levern Tart 31; Rebs: Sonny Dove 10	Pts: Jim Ligon 23; Rebs: Jim Ligon 17
Series tied, 1–1

Louisville Convention Center, Louisville, Kentucky
Attendance: 3,178

April 19

Box score

Kentucky Colonels 99, New York Nets 107
Scoring by quarter: 18–31, 24–29, 25–23, 32–24
Pts: Louie Dampier 19; Rebs: Jim Ligon 9	Pts: Sonny Dove 25; Rebs: Dove, Simon, Johnson 11 each
New York leads series, 2–1

Island Garden, West Hempstead, New York
Attendance: 2,106

April 22

Box score

Kentucky Colonels 128, New York Nets 101
Scoring by quarter: 34–21, 23–19, 34–27, 37–34
Pts: Darel Carrier 29; Rebs: Gene Moore 15	Pts: Levern Tart 21; Rebs: Johnson, Dove 9 each
Series tied, 2–2

Island Garden, West Hempstead, New York
Attendance: 4,721

April 26

Box score

New York Nets 127, Kentucky Colonels 112
Scoring by quarter: 26–21, 28–28, 36–27, 37–36
Pts: Bill Melchionni 39; Rebs: Les Hunter 12	Pts: Gene Moore 28; Rebs: Gene Moore 14
New York leads series, 3–2

Louisville Convention Center, Louisville, Kentucky
Attendance: 2,045

April 28

Box score

Kentucky Colonels 116, New York Nets 113
Scoring by quarter: 30–23, 27–30, 29–23, 30–37
Pts: Louie Dampier 26; Rebs: Jim Ligon 13	Pts: Les Hunter 28; Rebs: Ed Johnson 12
Series tied, 3–3

Island Garden, West Hempstead, New York
Attendance: 5,039

April 29

Box score

New York Nets 101, Kentucky Colonels 112
Scoring by quarter: 31–25, 17–21, 24–34, 29–32
Pts: Sonny Dove 24; Rebs: Sonny Dove 13	Pts: Louie Dampier 22; Rebs: Jim Ligon 11
Kentucky wins series, 4–3

Louisville Convention Center, Louisville, Kentucky
Attendance: 2,876

== Division Finals ==
=== Western Division Finals ===
==== (1) Denver Rockets vs. (4) Los Angeles Stars ====
April 30

Box score

Los Angeles Stars 113, Denver Rockets 123 (OT)
Scoring by quarter: 30–23, 26–30, 22–32, 27–20, Overtime: 8–18
Pts: Calvin, Stone 33 each Rebs: Trooper Washington 20	Pts: Spencer Haywood 39; Rebs: Spencer Haywood 31; Asts: Larry Jones 10
Denver leads series, 1–0

Denver Auditorium Arena, Denver, Colorado
Attendance: 7,071

May 1

Box score

Los Angeles Stars 114, Denver Rockets 105
Scoring by quarter: 31–29, 22–35, 28–17, 33–24
Pts: Mack Calvin 25; Rebs: Raymond, Warren 13 each	Pts: Spencer Haywood 40; Rebs: Haywood, Beck 18 each
Series tied, 1–1

Denver Auditorium Arena, Denver, Colorado
Attendance: 7,187

May 4

Box score

Denver Rockets 113, Los Angeles Stars 119
Scoring by quarter: 35–32, 26–29, 25–27, 27–31
Pts: Spencer Haywood 37; Rebs: Spencer Haywood 22; Asts: Larry Jones 7	Pts: Mack Calvin 31; Rebs: Trooper Washington 18; Asts: Calvin, Washington 7 each
Los Angeles leads series, 2–1

Los Angeles Memorial Sports Arena, Los Angeles, California
Attendance: 4,468

May 5

Box score

Denver Rockets 110, Los Angeles Stars 114
Scoring by quarter: 27–31, 30–26, 28–36, 25–21
Pts: Spencer Haywood 32; Rebs: Haywood, Beck 13 each Asts: Jeff Congdon 12	Pts: Mervin Jackson 25; Rebs: Craig Raymond 17; Asts: Mervin Jackson 8
Los Angeles leads series, 3–1

Los Angeles Memorial Sports Arena, Los Angeles, California
Attendance: 3,432

May 9

Box score

Los Angeles Stars 109, Denver Rockets 107
Scoring by quarter: 24–32, 32–20, 25–32, 28–23
Pts: George Stone 22; Rebs: Trooper Washington 17	Pts: Spencer Haywood 37; Rebs: Byron Beck 17
Los Angeles wins series, 4–1

Denver Auditorium Arena, Denver, Colorado
Attendance: 6,401

=== Eastern Division Finals ===
==== (1) Indiana Pacers vs. (2) Kentucky Colonels ====
May 1

Box score

Kentucky Colonels 114, Indiana Pacers 110 (OT)
Scoring by quarter: 21–24, 24–17, 30–30, 27–31, Overtime: 12–8
Pts: Jim Ligon 34; Rebs: Jim Ligon 24; Asts: Louie Dampier 6	Pts: Roger Brown 29; Rebs: Mel Daniels 21; Asts: Brown Keller 6 each
Kentucky leads series, 1–0

Indiana State Fairgrounds Coliseum, Indianapolis, Indiana
Attendance: 5,939

May 2

Box score

Kentucky Colonels 110, Indiana Pacers 121
Scoring by quarter: 23–31, 26–20, 28–36, 33–34
Pts: Darel Carrier 31; Rebs: Gene Moore 16; Asts: Darel Carrier 5	Pts: Roger Brown 33; Rebs: Bob Netolicky 22; Asts: Brown, Keller 5 each
Series tied 1–1

Indiana State Fairgrounds Coliseum, Indianapolis, Indiana
Attendance: 7,007

May 3

Box score

Indiana Pacers 114, Kentucky Colonels 110
Scoring by quarter: 26–28, 27–21, 30–36, 31–25
Pts: Freddie Lewis 31; Rebs: Mel Daniels 17; Asts: Billy Keller 7	Pts: Dampier, Chapman 22 each Rebs: Jim Ligon 15; Asts: Louie Dampier 8
Indiana leads series, 2–1

Louisville Convention Center, Louisville, Kentucky
Attendance: 3,024

May 5

Box score

Indiana Pacers 111, Kentucky Colonels 103
Scoring by quarter: 21–26, 34–21, 29–28, 27–28
Pts: Roger Brown 33; Rebs: Netolicky, Daniels 13 each Asts: Roger Brown 10	Pts: Gene Moore 26; Rebs: Gene Moore 28; Asts: Gene Moore 6
Indiana leads series, 3–1

Louisville Convention Center, Louisville, Kentucky
Attendance: 3,476

May 6

Box score

Kentucky Colonels 103, Indiana Pacers 117
Scoring by quarter: 30–26, 21–29, 22–25, 30–37
Pts: Gene Moore 25; Rebs: Gene Moore 14; Asts: Ligon, Dampier 5 each	Pts: Roger Brown 28; Rebs: Mel Daniels 22; Asts: Roger Brown 8
Indiana wins series, 4–1

Indiana State Fairgrounds Coliseum, Indianapolis, Indiana
Attendance: 5,453

== ABA Finals: (W4) Los Angeles Stars vs. (E1) Indiana Pacers ==
May 15

Box score

Los Angeles Stars 93, Indiana Pacers 109
Scoring by quarter: 24–21, 20–28, 27–24, 22–36
Pts: Bob Warren 20; Rebs: Craig Raymond 23; Asts: Mack Calvin 5	Pts: Freddie Lewis 22; Rebs: Bob Netolicky 14; Asts: Billy Keller 10
Indiana leads series, 1–0

Indiana State Fair Coliseum, Indianapolis, Indiana
Attendance: 7,881

Favored to win by members of the press to win the series, the Pacers ultimately pulled away in the fourth quarter.

CBS

May 17

Box score

Los Angeles Stars 111, Indiana Pacers 114
Scoring by quarter: 27–21, 31–31, 26–30, 27–32
Pts: George Stone 29; Rebs: Willie Wise 11; Asts: Trooper Washington 5	Pts: Bob Netolicky 32; Rebs: Mel Daniels 27; Asts: Billy Keller 8
Indiana leads series, 2–0

Indiana State Fair Coliseum, Indianapolis, Indiana
Attendance: 9,014

The game was broadcast on CBS, although it was blacked out in Indianapolis. The Stars led 66-56 early in the third quarter before Bob Netolicky came off the bench and managed to hit on ten straight shots as the Pacers eventually tied the game at 94 with 8:31 to go. The teams traded leads eight times before Roger Brown hit the go-ahead shot to give Indiana a 111–108 lead. The Stars got the deficit to one on a goaltending call with 34 seconds to go and then got the ball back on a missed shot with less than 20 seconds to go and called timeout. They tried a shot to go for the win but missed while Netolicky got the rebound and was then fouled by Willie Wise (his fifth) as Netolicky made the free throws to end the scoring.

May 18

Box score

Indiana Pacers 106, Los Angeles Stars 109
Scoring by quarter: 38–17, 22–30, 28–31, 18–31
Pts: Freddie Lewis 24; Rebs: Mel Daniels 20; Asts: Roger Brown 6	Pts: George Stone 34; Rebs: Craig Raymond 18; Asts: Merv Jackson 8
Indiana leads series, 2–1

Anaheim Convention Center, Anaheim, California
Attendance: 5,780

Behind the largest crowd of the season for the Stars (5,780), the team trailed by 21 at the end of the first quarter and 10 at the start of the fourth quarter but rode the shooting of George Stone and Trooper Washington to win the game. Stone scored 27 of his 34 points in the second half while Washington defended Daniels in the second half that saw the Stars go on a 25–2 run to start the fourth quarter. Stone scored the go-ahead shot with 7:33 remaining as the Stars held on and had Indiana not make a field goal until 1:59 remained in the game.

May 19

Box score

Indiana Pacers 142, Los Angeles Stars 120
Scoring by quarter: 35–25, 28–37, 45–32, 34–26
Pts: Roger Brown 53; Rebs: Roger Brown 13; Asts: Brown, Thacker 6 each	Pts: Andrew Anderson 20; Rebs: George Stone 14; Asts: Trooper Washington 8
Indiana leads series, 3–1

Anaheim Convention Center, Anaheim, California
Attendance: 7,027

Roger Brown scored 53 points to set a then-ABA playoff record for points in one game (Rick Barry previously held the mark with 52 points in the First Round matchup), with 33 of them coming in the second half. He went 15-of-21 on field goals with three made three-pointers. The Pacers, going with Leonard's strategy to go to Brown on one-on-one situations, went from having an 85–83 lead with 4:50 to go in the third quarter to being up 108–94 by the end of the third quarter and the Pacers held on from there. Brown's 53 points in a playoff game is still a franchise record.

CBS

May 23

Box score

Los Angeles Stars 117, Indiana Pacers 113 (OT)
Scoring by quarter: 27–27, 22–30, 29–27, 29–23, Overtime: 10–6
Pts: Mack Calvin 33; Rebs: George Stone 15; Asts: Mack Calvin 7	Pts: Roger Brown 39; Rebs: Bob Netolicky 18; Asts: Roger Brown 8
Indiana leads series, 3–2

Indiana State Fair Coliseum, Indianapolis, Indiana
Attendance: 10,548

Facing elimination on a nationally televised game (which was once again blacked out in Indianapolis), the Stars delayed their elimination with an overtime victory. The Pacers led 86–78 with eleven minutes to go, but the Stars roared back to tie the game multiple times before grabbing the lead with five minutes to go, having gone on a 21–9 run in nearly six minutes. Indiana responded with five straight points to get the lead back as the teams went back and forth. John Barnhill had a chance to increase the lead when it was 105–104 for Indiana but missed them both (going 1-of-6 on the day). Bob Netolicky gave the Pacers a 107–105 lead with free throws and 34 seconds left, but Merv Jackson tied the game on a 20-foot shot with 16 seconds to tie the game again. With the game tied, Roger Brown tried to end the game with a 10-foot jumper with time expiring but the ball rolled around the rim and fell out, forcing overtime. The Pacers led 110–109 with 4:32 to go, but the Stars took control from there, with Mack Calvin giving the Stars the lead for good with 2:46 to go. The Pacers had one more chance when down 115–114 and Brown on the free-throw line to shoot his second free throw, which he intentionally missed to try and rebound it, but George Stone recovered it while Calvin sank free throws to end the scoring. Calvin scored 33 points to lead the Stars in scoring.

May 25

Box score

Indiana Pacers 111, Los Angeles Stars 107
Scoring by quarter: 34–27, 20–26, 24–27, 33–27
Pts: Roger Brown 45; Rebs: Mel Daniels 27; Asts: Tom Thacker 7	Pts: George Stone 28; Rebs: Trooper Washington 15; Asts: Mack Calvin 9
Indiana wins series, 4–2

Los Angeles Memorial Sports Arena, Los Angeles, California
Attendance: 8,233

The Pacers elected to go with a seven-man roster for Game 6 (with Roger Brown and Freddie Lewis both playing 48 minutes each) and used it to battle tough with the Stars, who lost center Craig Raymond to a severely sprained right ankle early in the second half that head coach Bill Sharman said played a key difference, particularly on boards. The Stars got the deficit down to 106–105 before Freddie Lewis hit a 14-foot shot with 18 seconds left to give them a three-point lead. The Pacers then closed out the scoring with free throws as Indiana clinched their first ever professional sports championship.

In what became a general tradition, offers by the ABA champion to the NBA champion (in this case, the New York Knicks) were made and rejected. In the afternoon hours of May 27, 1970, the Pacers arrived back in Indianapolis to be greeted by a thousand fans at the airport. The team then received a motorcade as Indianapolis held a downtown ceremony that saw nearly 5,000 people celebrate on Monument Circle that saw speeches from the team and state Governor Edgar Whitcomb, who proclaimed the team as "the world champions of basketball".

After the series ended, Bill Daniels, who bought the Stars mid-season and aimed to relocate the team, finally made his decision. It was reported during the series that he would not move the team to Albuquerque, New Mexico, with reports stating that the two finalists were between Anaheim, California (one of the myriad of Southern California arenas they currently used as a home court) and Salt Lake City, Utah. On June 11, less than a month after Game 6, the Stars elected to move to Salt Lake City, Utah. Two members of the Pacers eventually made the Naismith Basketball Hall of Fame: Mel Daniels (2012) and Roger Brown (2013), while both head coaches from the series in Bill Sharman (2004) and Bobby Leonard (2014) also were later inducted.

== Statistical leaders ==
Category	Total			Average			
Category	Player	Team	Total	Player	Team	Avg.	Games played
Points	Spencer Haywood	Denver Rockets	440	Rick Barry	Washington Caps	40.1	7
Rebounds	Mel Daniels	Indiana Pacers	265	Spencer Haywood	Denver Rockets	19.8	12
Assists	Mack Calvin	Los Angeles Stars	101	Larry Brown	Washington Caps	9.7	7

=== Total leaders ===
Points

1. Spencer Haywood - 440
2. Roger Brown - 428
3. George Stone - 402
4. Mack Calvin - 392
5. Larry Jones - 319

Rebounds

1. Mel Daniels - 265
2. Craig Raymond - 254
3. Spencer Haywood - 237
4. Bob Netolicky - 194
5. Trooper Washington - 188

Assists

1. Mack Calvin - 101
2. Roger Brown - 84
3. Louie Dampier - 81
4. Larry Jones - 76
5. Jeff Congdon - 68
6. Billy Keller - 68
7. Larry Brown - 68

Minutes

1. George Stone - 724
2. Roger Brown - 693
3. Craig Raymond - 664
4. Bob Netolicky - 603
5. Mack Calvin - 593
