= Doug Moe =

American basketball player and coach (1938–2026)

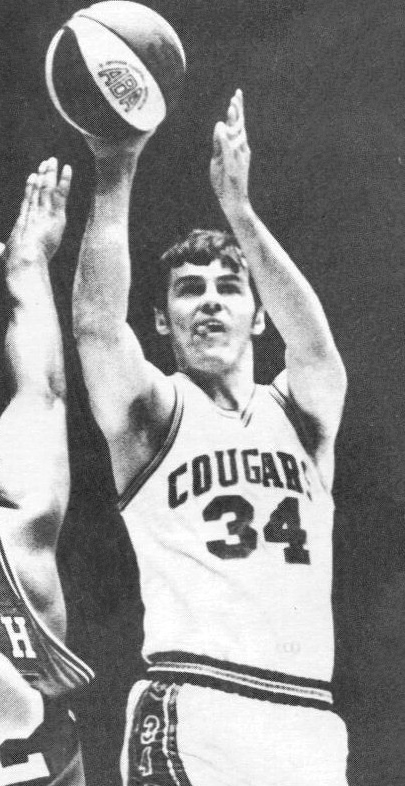
- Moe with the Carolina Cougars, c. 1970

Personal information
- Born: September 21, 1938 New York City, New York, U.S.
- Died: February 17, 2026 (aged 87) San Antonio, Texas, U.S.
- Listed height: 6 ft 5 in (1.96 m)
- Listed weight: 215 lb (98 kg)

Career information
- High school: Bullis School (Potomac, Maryland)
- College: North Carolina (1958–1961)
- NBA draft: 1961: 2nd round, 22nd overall pick
- Drafted by: Chicago Packers
- Playing career: 1965–1972
- Position: Small forward
- Number: 34, 15
- Coaching career: 1972–2008

Career history

Playing
- 1965–1967: Pallacanestro Petrarca Padova
- 1967–1968: New Orleans Buccaneers
- 1968–1969: Oakland Oaks
- 1969–1970: Carolina Cougars
- 1970–1972: Virginia Squires

Career highlights
- As player: ABA champion (1969); 3× ABA All-Star (1968–1970); All-ABA First Team (1968); All-ABA Second Team (1969); Lega Basket Serie A top scorer (1966); First-team All-American – USBWA (1961); Second-team All-American – AP, SN (1961); Third-team All-American – NABC, NEA (1961); 2× First-team All-ACC (1959, 1961); As coach: NBA Coach of the Year (1988); Chuck Daly Lifetime Achievement Award (2018); No. 432 honored by Denver Nuggets

Career ABA playing statistics
- Points: 6,161 (16.3 ppg)
- Rebounds: 2,560 (6.8 rpg)
- Assists: 1,197 (3.2 apg)
- Stats at Basketball Reference

Career coaching record
- NBA: 628–529 (.543)
- Record at Basketball Reference

Douglas Edwin Moe (September 21, 1938 – February 17, 2026) was an American professional basketball player and coach. A star small forward playing college basketball for the North Carolina Tar Heels, Moe was a two-time All-American but was accused of point shaving. He was cleared of fixing games, but was kicked out of school and blackballed from the National Basketball Association (NBA). Moe played professionally in the Italian league Lega Basket Serie A in 1965 before signing on with the upstart American Basketball Association (ABA) with the New Orleans Buccaneers in 1967, where he played with his former college teammate Larry Brown. Moe played five seasons for four teams while being named an ABA All-Star three times and winning the ABA championship in 1969 with the Oakland Oaks.

Injuries to his knees forced him to retire at the age of 33, and he immediately became an assistant coach with Brown's Carolina Cougars in 1972. He joined Brown on the Denver Nuggets in 1974 before being named head coach of the San Antonio Spurs in 1976 as their very first coach in the NBA era. In four seasons, with a high-scoring offense, the Spurs won their first ever division championship in the 1977–78 season before repeating the following year and reaching the conference finals, but Moe was fired 66 games into the following season. In 1980, he became head coach of the Denver Nuggets, where he coached the next ten years. They won 432 games in his tenure of run-and-gun offense with nine postseason appearances, two division championships and a conference finals appearance in 1985 while Moe was named NBA Coach of the Year in 1988. He was fired by the Nuggets in 1990 and was hired by the Philadelphia 76ers in 1992, where they won 19 of 56 games before he was fired. He became a coaching consultant for Denver in 2002 (which retired a "432" banner in his honor that same year) and served as an assistant coach until 2008.

In 2018, he was awarded the Chuck Daly Lifetime Achievement Award.

== Early life ==
Douglas Edwin Moe was born in Brooklyn, New York, on September 21, 1938. Growing up in the playground of Foster Park in the Flatbush section of town, he would play games six days a week in the place once called the "Stars' Park". He loved basketball so much that he would play in various church leagues under various assumed names (whether it was Protestant or Jewish). Moe attended and graduated from Erasmus Hall High School and attracted enough attention to be recruited to the University of North Carolina at Chapel Hill despite playing just one year of high school ball.

== College career ==
Moe was a star player for the North Carolina Tar Heels, earning All-American honors twice.

Once, in 1961, Moe was on the same flight as then-former U.S. vice president Richard Nixon while Moe played for the Tar Heels. Noted for his fear of flying, Moe tried to read a book to distract himself; when Nixon was introduced to Moe by a coach, he stated Moe must be the student in the group and Moe (unfamiliar with the person making the remark) remarked, "What are you, a wise guy?"

However, Moe's collegiate career ended in controversy due to a point-shaving scandal in 1961. In the summer of 1960, before his senior year, he received $75 from fix conspirator Aaron Wagman to fly to a meeting in New Jersey, arranged by Moe's teammate and friend, conspirator Lou Brown, but Moe turned down an offer to throw games. He was cleared of fixing games, but was suspended from North Carolina by Chancellor William Brantley Aycock for initially denying any knowledge of the scandal.

== Professional career ==
=== Pallacanestro Petrarca Padova (1965–1967) ===
Moe was selected by the Detroit Pistons in the seventh round of the 1960 NBA draft in 1960, and was re-drafted by the Chicago Packers (now Washington Wizards) in the 1961 draft. He signed with the Packers, but they refused to honor the contract after the point-shaving scandal broke. He was also blackballed by the NBA. Moe subsequently spent time in the Army and sold insurance. He graduated from Elon College in 1965 in education.

In 1965, he began his professional career in Italy's Lega Basket Serie A with the Pallacanestro Petrarca Padova.

=== New Orleans Buccaneers (1967–1968) ===
Moe, alongside fellow former Tar Heel and roommate Larry Brown, joined in with the newly formed ABA with the New Orleans Buccaneers in 1967 for $5,000. Moe played a season for the team, which reached the ABA Finals that saw him along with Brown to be named ABA All-Stars. In 78 games, he averaged 24.2 points with 10.2 rebounds and 2.6 assists. He finished second in voting for the ABA Most Valuable Player (MVP), receiving three of the 22 first-place votes (Connie Hawkins received the rest). Just a few months after the season ended, Moe and Brown were traded to the Oakland Oaks for Ronald Franz, Steve Jones and Barry Leibowitz.

=== Oakland Oaks (1968–1969) ===
Moe, alongside Brown, was traded to the Oakland Oaks. In 75 games, he averaged 19.0 points with 8.2 rebounds and 2.0 assists and received small MVP consideration to go along with All-Star honors. They played for the Oaks during what became a magic run that saw them go from worst to first to reach the playoffs. They made it all the way to the ABA Finals against the Indiana Pacers. In Game 5, Moe made two free throws late to give the Oaks a three-point lead late in overtime before his teammate Brown made two more to give them an insurmountable 135–131 lead to clinch the game and the series.

=== Carolina Cougars (1969–1970) ===
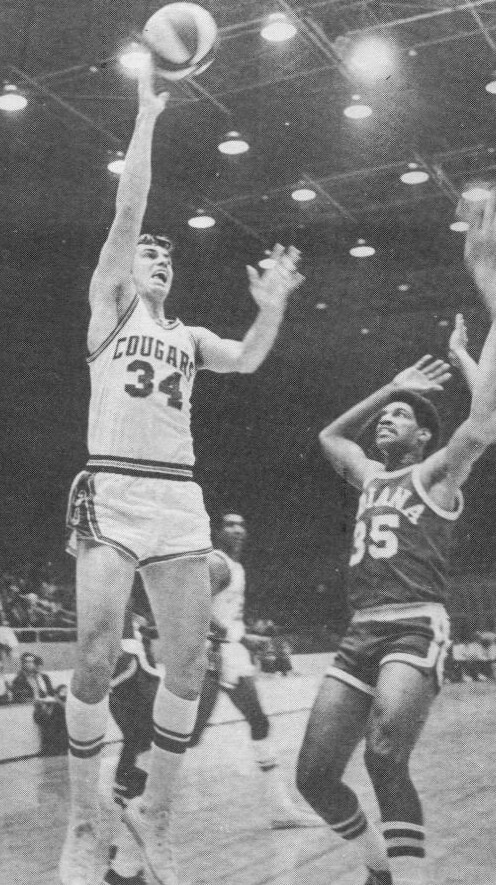
Moe with the Carolina Cougars shoots over Roger Brown in 1970.

Moe played for the Carolina Cougars in 1969–70, when he was named the team's MVP. Though he was hampered much of the season by injury, he averaged 17.4 points per game and led all ABA forwards in assists, ranking seventh overall.

=== Virginia Squires (1970–1972) ===
Moe played for the Virginia Squires from 1970 to 1972. By 1972, his knees were in bad shape, and he elected to retire from playing after the end of the season at the age of 33. He finished as a three-time all-star in an injury-shortened five-year ABA playing career.

== Coaching career ==
=== Carolina Cougars (1972–1974) ===
Moe began his coaching career with the Carolina Cougars in the ABA as an assistant coach to his former college teammate Larry Brown from 1972 to 1974.

=== Denver Nuggets (1974–1976) ===
Moe then followed Brown to Denver, where they coached the Nuggets from 1974 to 1976. During those two seasons, the Nuggets were 125–43 (.744). They advanced to the ABA Finals in 1976, but lost to the New York Nets in six games.

=== San Antonio Spurs (1976–1980) ===
On June 30, 1976, Moe was named head coach of the San Antonio Spurs, who were to be members of the NBA after the ABA–NBA merger that year; he replaced Bob Bass. The Spurs started off slow that year but were ten games over .500 by February and managed to win 44 games with a high-scoring average of 115 points a game to go with allowing a league-worst 114 points a game; described as a "player's coach", the team captivated the town. They lost in the first round of the playoffs in two games. The following season was better for the team, as George Gervin won his first scoring title and the team won their first ever division title with a 52–30 record that was good enough for second best in the Eastern Conference. They were shocked by the Washington Bullets, who beat them in six games.

They repeated as division champions in 1979 and beat the Philadelphia 76ers in the semifinals that year for their first ever playoff series win since moving to San Antonio. In the conference finals, they faced the Bullets and took three of the first four games but could not finish the deal, losing the decisive seventh game 107–105 to the defending NBA champions.

The Spurs sputtered in the following season. They were 33–33 when Moe was fired by team owner Angelo Drossos with sixteen games remaining in the 1979–80 season; he was replaced by Bass, who by then was the team's general manager.

=== Denver Nuggets (1980–1990) ===
Moe was hired by the Denver Nuggets in December 1980 to take over the head coaching reins from another UNC alum, Donnie Walsh.

From 1980 to 1990, Moe compiled a 432–357 (.548) record and led the Nuggets to the postseason nine straight years—advancing as far as the Western Conference Finals in 1985. He guided the Nuggets to two Midwest Division titles (1984–85 and '87–88) and a franchise-record 54 wins in 1987–88. He was named NBA Coach of the Year that same year. Under Moe's direction, the Nuggets high-octane offense led the league in scoring in six of his 10 seasons in Denver. They hold the NBA record for most points per game in a season, scoring 126.48 in 1981–82, when they also became the only NBA team to score 100 points or more in all 82 games of a season. In 1982–83, the Nuggets' Alex English and Kiki VanDeWeghe finished first and second in the NBA in scoring, respectively, a feat which has not been achieved since. (Note: The only other time was in 1954–55 by the Philadelphia Warriors' Neil Johnston (first) and Paul Arizin (second).) On December 13, 1983, Denver lost 186–184 to Detroit in triple overtime, and the 370 combined points remains the highest-scoring game in NBA history.

Moe used a run-and-gun offense which had his team shoot before the opponent's defense had set up. He ran almost no plays, instead relying on ball movement, screens and constant cuts to the basket. Players were not to hold onto the ball for longer than two seconds. The movement of the ball was predicated on what the defense allowed. "You can't diagram it, you can't put a pencil and paper to it. If you do, you're doing an injustice to the system", said former Nuggets assistant Allan Bristow. Moe simply said, "The passing game is basically doing whatever the hell you want."

Moe's passing strategy was adopted from North Carolina head coach Dean Smith. Smith, normally a conservative coach, thought that the passing game could work with the right players, but he did not believe players would be smart enough to execute it at all times. Though his offensive strategy led to high scores, Moe's Denver teams were never adept at running fast breaks. His teams at times appeared to give up baskets in order to get one. He disputed the fact that his teams did not play defense, attributing the high scores to the pace of the game.

Moe announced his dismissal from the Nuggets on September 6, 1990, at a press conference where he and his wife Jane had a champagne toast. He had three years remaining on his contract but was caught in the middle of a front-office restructure initiated by Comsat Video Enterprises, Inc. which had purchased the franchise eleven months earlier. Comsat chief executive officer Robert Wussler was most critical of his coaching. Moe is honored by the Nuggets with a banner that reads "432" for his number of wins as a Nuggets' head coach.

=== Philadelphia 76ers (1992–1993) ===
On May 27, 1992, Moe was hired by the Philadelphia 76ers. He was hired to a five-year contract. He had his son David Moe serve as an assistant coach. Less than two months after he was hired, the 76ers traded away star power forward Charles Barkley to the Phoenix Suns. On March 7, 1993, Moe was fired 56 games into the season with the team at 19–37 (in one game prior to his firing, the 76ers lost by 56 points). He stated his regrets upon the firing as one that failed to live to his vision, "I knew a few guys were going to have to play at a higher level than they'd ever played, but I believed that, if we played to the max, it was possible to get to 50 wins. But it was unrealistic. That probably hurt us. The expectations were too high. We underachieved."

=== Denver Nuggets (2002–2008) ===
Moe joined the Nuggets as a coaching consultant in 2002. He was moved to being an assistant coach in February 2005 under head coach George Karl. He served as an assistant until 2008.

== On coming to the NBA after the NBA–ABA merger ==
"One of the biggest disappointments in my life was going into the NBA after the merger. The NBA was a rinky-dink league—listen, I'm very serious about this. The league was run like garbage. There was no camaraderie; a lot of the NBA guys were aloof and thought they were too good to practice or play hard. The NBA All-Star Games were nothing—guys didn't even want to play in them and the fans could [sic] care less about the games. It wasn't until the 1980s, when David Stern became commissioner, that the NBA figured out what the hell they were doing, and what they did was a lot of stuff we had in the ABA—from the 3-point shot to All-Star weekend to the show biz stuff. Now the NBA is like the old ABA. Guys play hard, they show their enthusiasm and there is a closeness in the league. Hell, the ABA might have lost the battle, but we won the war. The NBA now plays our kind of basketball."

== Death ==
Moe died in San Antonio on February 17, 2026, at the age of 87 following complications from cancer.

== Legacy ==
Moe's overall NBA head coaching ledger stands at 628–529 (.543), the 19th most in NBA history. His win total was the most in Nuggets history until Michael Malone passed him on November 23, 2024.

In 1997, Moe was inducted into the Colorado Sports Hall of Fame. He was inducted into the NYC Basketball Hall of Fame in 1998. In 2015, he was inducted into the San Antonio Sports Hall of Fame.

In 2018, he received the Chuck Daly Lifetime Achievement Award.

== Career playing statistics ==
Legend
GP	Games played	GS	Games started	MPG	Minutes per game
FG%	Field goal percentage	3P%	3-point field goal percentage	FT%	Free throw percentage
RPG	Rebounds per game	APG	Assists per game	SPG	Steals per game
BPG	Blocks per game	PPG	Points per game	**Bold**	Career high

†	Denotes seasons in which Moe's team won an ABA championship

=== ABA ===
==== Regular season ====
Year	Team	GP	GS	MPG	FG%	3P%	FT%	RPG	APG	PPG
1967–68	New Orleans	78		**39.9**	.413	.136	.795	**10.2**	2.6	**24.2**
1968–69†	Oakland	75		33.7	.431	**.357**	.811	8.2	2.0	19.0
1969–70	Carolina	**80**		33.4	.427	.235	.762	5.5	**5.3**	17.3
1970–71	Virginia	78		29.4	**.456**	.200	**.853**	6.1	3.5	13.0
1971–72	Virginia	67		22.0	.422	.111	.806	3.6	2.2	6.8
Career		378		32.0	.428	.213	.800	6.8	3.2	16.3
All-Star		3	1	30.3	.419	.000	.625	7.0	5.7	12.0

==== Playoffs ====
Year	Team	GP	MPG	FG%	3P%	FT%	RPG	APG	PPG
1968	New Orleans	**17**	**42.1**	.416	**.364**	.718	**9.9**	2.4	**23.5**
1969†	Oakland	16	37.1	.405	.000	.784	7.8	1.9	19.8
1970	Carolina	4	42.0	.329	.000	.750	6.9	**6.3**	15.5
1971	Virginia	12	35.1	**.508**	.333	.756	4.8	3.1	17.7
1972	Virginia	11	22.3	.435	.000	**.880**	3.9	2.5	8.7
Career		60	35.7	.425	.217	.757	7.0	2.7	18.1

== Head coaching record ==
Legend
Regular season	G	Games coached	W	Games won	L	Games lost	W–L %	Win–loss %
Playoffs	PG	Playoff games	PW	Playoff wins	PL	Playoff losses	PW–L %	Playoff win–loss %

=== NBA ===
Team	Year	G	W	L	W–L%	Finish	PG	PW	PL	PW–L%	Result
SAS	1976–77	82	44	38	.537	3rd in Central	2	0	2	.000	Lost in First Round
SAS	1977–78	82	52	30	.634	1st in Central	6	2	4	.333	Lost in Conf. Semifinals
SAS	1978–79	82	48	34	.585	1st in Central	14	7	7	.500	Lost in Conf. Finals
SAS	1979–80	66	33	33	.500	(fired)	—	—	—	—	—
DEN	1980–81	51	26	25	.510	4th in Midwest	—	—	—	—	Missed Playoffs
DEN	1981–82	82	46	36	.561	2nd in Midwest	3	1	2	.333	Lost in First Round
DEN	1982–83	82	45	37	.549	2nd in Midwest	8	3	5	.375	Lost in Conf. Semifinals
DEN	1983–84	82	38	44	.463	3rd in Midwest	5	2	3	.400	Lost in First Round
DEN	1984–85	82	52	30	.634	1st in Midwest	15	8	7	.533	Lost in Conf. Finals
DEN	1985–86	82	47	35	.573	2nd in Midwest	10	5	5	.500	Lost in Conf. Semifinals
DEN	1986–87	82	37	45	.451	4th in Midwest	3	0	3	.000	Lost in First Round
DEN	1987–88	82	54	28	.659	1st in Midwest	11	5	6	.455	Lost in Conf. Semifinals
DEN	1988–89	82	44	38	.537	3rd in Midwest	3	0	3	.000	Lost in First Round
DEN	1989–90	82	43	39	.524	4th in Midwest	3	0	3	.000	Lost in First Round
PHI	1992–93	56	19	37	.339	(fired)	—	—	—	—	—
Career		1157	628	529	.543		83	33	50	.398	
