= Bob Verga =

American basketball player (born 1945)

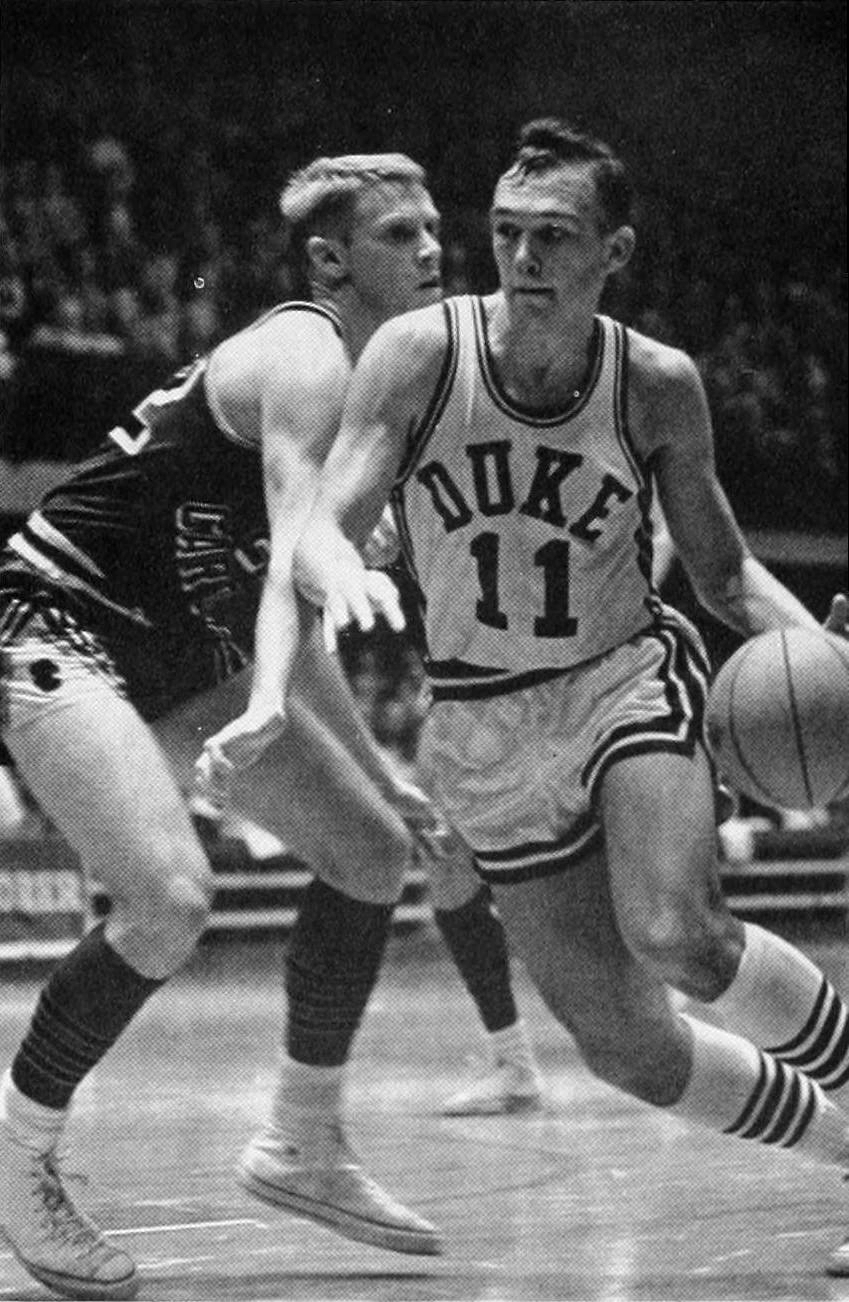
- Verga with Duke in 1964

Personal information
- Born: September 7, 1945 (age 81) Neptune Township, New Jersey, U.S.
- Listed height: 6 ft 1 in (1.85 m)
- Listed weight: 190 lb (86 kg)

Career information
- High school: St. Rose (Belmar, New Jersey)
- College: Duke (1964–1967)
- NBA draft: 1967: 3rd round, 25th overall pick
- Drafted by: St. Louis Hawks
- Playing career: 1967–1977
- Position: Point guard
- Number: 11, 27, 22, 20, 17

Career history
- 1967–1968: Dallas Chaparrals
- 1968: Denver Rockets
- 1968–1969: New York Nets
- 1969: Houston Mavericks
- 1969–1971: Carolina Cougars
- 1971–1972: Pittsburgh Condors
- 1973–1974: Portland Trail Blazers
- 1976–1977: Jersey Shore Bullets

Career highlights
- 2× ABA All-Star (1968, 1970); All-ABA First Team (1970); Consensus first-team All-American (1967); Consensus second-team All-American (1966); 3× First-team All-ACC (1965–1967)

Career ABA and NBA statistics
- Points: 6,918 (20.2 ppg)
- Rebounds: 1,336 (3.9 rpg)
- Assists: 1,004 (2.9 apg)
- Stats at NBA.com
- Stats at Basketball Reference

Robert Bruce Verga (born September 7, 1945) is an American former professional basketball player, who played in the American Basketball Association and the National Basketball Association (NBA) from 1967 to 1974. He was a 6 ft 1 in (1.85 m) guard and played college basketball for the Duke Blue Devils. He was a two-time ABA All-Star, in 1968 and 1970.

Verga owned the Duke men's basketball record for points per game (26.1) in a single season, which he achieved in 1967.

Verga was drafted by the NBA's St. Louis Hawks in the third round of the 1967 NBA draft and by the Kentucky Colonels in the 1967 ABA Draft. Verga opted to play in the ABA and averaged 23.7 points per game in his rookie season for the Dallas Chaparrals. Verga averaged 18.8 points per game in his second ABA season, with the Houston Mavericks. Verga played the next two seasons with the Carolina Cougars, averaging 27.5 points per game during the 1969–70 season and 18.8 the following season. After averaging 17.5 points per game for the Pittsburgh Condors in the 1971–72 season Verga finished his career with the NBA's Portland Trail Blazers in the 1973–74 season.

== Career statistics ==
Legend
GP	Games played	GS	Games started	MPG	Minutes per game
FG%	Field goal percentage	3P%	3-point field goal percentage	FT%	Free throw percentage
RPG	Rebounds per game	APG	Assists per game	SPG	Steals per game
BPG	Blocks per game	PPG	Points per game	**Bold**	Career high

=== ABA/NBA ===
==== Regular season ====
Year	Team	GP	GS	MPG	FG%	3P%	FT%	RPG	APG	SPG	BPG	PPG
1967–68	Dallas (ABA)	31		41.5	.442	.260	.743	4.5	2.4			23.7
1968–69	Denver (ABA)	6		25.0	.312	.333	.643	3.5	1.8			11.2
1968–69	N.Y. Nets (ABA)	24		21.7	.363	.278	.715	2.8	1.7			12.8
1968–69	Houston (ABA)	33		34.3	.447	.277	.762	4.4	**4.1**			24.7
1969–70	Carolina (ABA)	**82**		**41.6**	.437	.307	**.811**	**5.2**	3.5			**27.5**
1970–71	Carolina (ABA)	75		26.8	**.458**	.227	.721	3.7	2.4			18.8
1971–72	Carolina (ABA)	8		15.9	.390	.300	.769	1.0	1.3			7.4
1971–72	Pittsburgh (ABA)	62		30.7	.442	**.381**	.714	3.7	3.9			18.8
1973–74	Portland (NBA)	21		10.3	.452		.625	.9	.8	.6	.0	5.0
Career (ABA)		321		32.8	.438	.296	.751	4.1	3.1			21.2
Career (overall)		342		31.4	.438	.296	.749	3.9	2.9	.6	.0	20.2
All-Star (ABA)		1	0	16.0	.429	.333	.500	5.0	2.0			14.0

==== Playoffs ====
Year	Team	GP	MPG	FG%	3P%	FT%	RPG	APG	PPG
1970	Carolina (ABA)	4	39.0	.471	.250	.727	2.8	2.5	27.0
