= Carolina Cougars =

- Division: Eastern Division
- Founded: 1969 (as Carolina Cougars)
- History: Houston Mavericks; 1967–1969; Carolina Cougars; 1969–1974; Spirits of St. Louis; 1974–1976
- Arena: Greensboro Coliseum; Charlotte Coliseum; Dorton Arena; Reynolds Coliseum
- Location: Greensboro, North Carolina (111 games); Charlotte, North Carolina (71 games); Raleigh, North Carolina (37 games)
- Team colors: Carolina Blue, Cardinal Red (1969–71) Green, Blue (1971–73) Blue, Green (1973–74)
- Head coach: Bones McKinney (1969–71); Jerry Steele (1971); Tom Meschery (1971–72); Larry Brown (1972–74)
- Ownership: Jim Gardner (1969–70); Tedd Munchak (1970–74)
- Championships: 0
- Division titles: 1 (1973)

The Carolina Cougars were a professional basketball franchise in the American Basketball Association that existed from 1969 through 1974. Originally a charter member of the ABA, the Houston Mavericks moved to North Carolina in 1969 after two unsuccessful seasons at the Sam Houston Coliseum. In 1974, the team was sold and moved to St. Louis, becoming the Spirits of St. Louis.

== History ==
=== Early years in Carolina ===
The idea for a regional franchise was developed two-fold. UNC graduate Frank Deford had outlined in Sports Illustrated on October 21, 1968, the feasibility of a regional franchise, particularly since North Carolina had never had a major league franchise. Don DeJardin, the former basketball captain from West Point, had actually served as a part-time director of player personnel for the 1967–68 Pittsburgh Pipers, and his experience there got him interested in running a team. When looking around for interested investors, he met upon then-Congressmen Jim Gardner; the two soon found people to form Southern Sports Corporation. Months later, Gardner bought the Houston Mavericks and moved them to North Carolina in 1969. At the time, none of North Carolina's large metropolitan areas – Charlotte, the Piedmont Triad, and The Triangle – was thought large enough to support a professional team on its own. With this in mind, Gardner decided to brand the Cougars as a "regional" team. Gardner sold the team after one season to Ted Munchak, who poured significant resources into the team.

The Cougars were based in Greensboro and played most of their home games at the Greensboro Coliseum, the state's largest arena at the time. Games were also regularly played in Charlotte at the (original) Charlotte Coliseum and in Raleigh at Dorton Arena and Reynolds Coliseum. In early 1972, three regular season games were played in Winston-Salem at the Winston-Salem Memorial Coliseum, and one game was played at Fort Bragg.

Early on, the Cougars were not especially successful on the court, posting a 42–42 record in the 1969–70 season, a 34–50 record in 1970–71, and a 35–49 record in 1971–72. The 1969–70 Cougars managed to make the ABA playoffs but lost in the Eastern Division semifinals (first round) to a much stronger Indiana Pacers team. In spite of this, the Cougars had a good fan following, particularly in Greensboro.

The 1971–72 team was coached by former NBA All-Star Tom Meschery, who had just retired from 10 years of NBA play with the San Francisco Warriors and the Seattle SuperSonics.

=== Success under Larry Brown ===
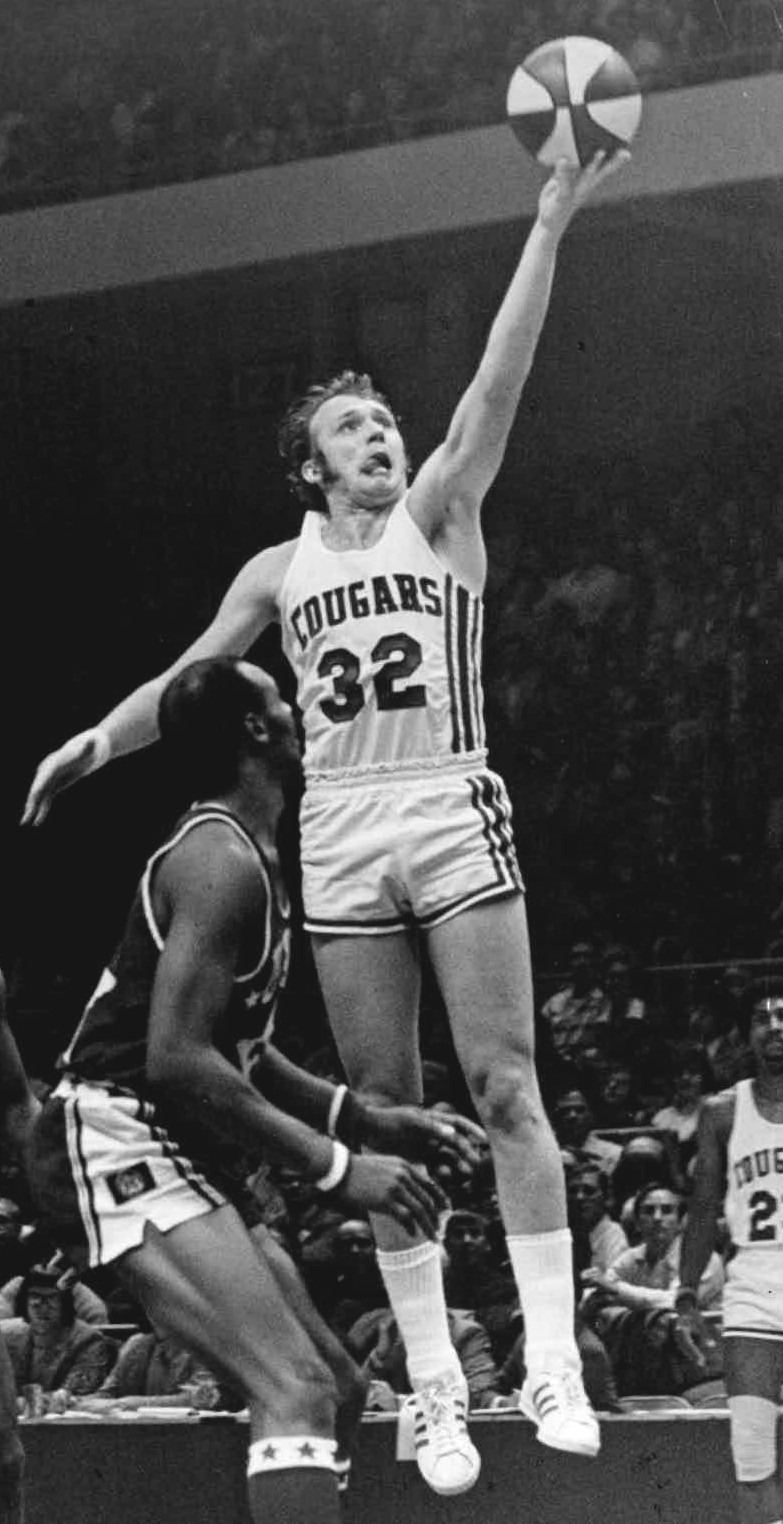
Cunningham in 1972

In 1972–73, the Cougars hired retired ABA players Larry Brown and former Cougar Doug Moe as coaches. The 1972–73 Cougars were fairly talented and featured players Billy Cunningham, Joe Caldwell, and Mack Calvin. All three appeared in the ABA All-Star Game that season, and Cunningham was named the league's Most Valuable Player.

Carolina went on to post a 57–27 record, which was the best in the ABA. The Cougars beat the New York Nets in their first-round playoff series 4 games to 1, but lost a close series to the Kentucky Colonels 4 games to 3 in the Eastern Division finals. There were many upset and disappointed fans in Greensboro when the Cougars decided to hold game 7 of the series in Charlotte. Of the 42 scheduled regular season home games, 25 were usually scheduled for Greensboro while only 12 were played in Charlotte. With Cougar management having the choice of city to play game 7, it mystified its Greensboro area fans with the choice to play such a pivotal game on a less familiar court. Game 7 was hotly contested but Kentucky prevailed, much to Cougar fans dismay.

The 1973–74 Cougars started the season strong, winning 17 of their first 22 games. Despite injuries and internal squabbles, the Cougars posted a 47–37 record but were swept in the Eastern Division semifinals 4 games to 0 by the Kentucky Colonels.

=== Move to St. Louis ===
1973–74 turned out to be the Cougars' last season in North Carolina. Although they were moderately successful overall and had one of the most loyal fan bases in the ABA, talks toward an ABA–NBA merger were in the final stages, and it had become apparent that a "regional" franchise would not be viable in the NBA. The Charlotte/Greensboro/Raleigh axis (the Piedmont Crescent or I-85 Corridor) was beginning an unprecedented period of growth that continues today, and the Greensboro Coliseum was built to NBA specifications of the time. However, none of the Cougars' home cities were big enough at the time to support an NBA team on their own. Additionally, several persons quoted in the book Loose Balls by Terry Pluto say the added travel expenses incurred by the regional concept ultimately proved insurmountable (Carl Scheer was quoted as saying that expenses were high due to having offices for three different cities while Munchak thought Charlotte, the largest city, should have been the main headquarters).

Munchak sold the Cougars to a consortium of New York businessmen headed by brothers Ozzie and Daniel Silna, who moved to St. Louis as the Spirits of St. Louis. However, the new owners assembled an almost entirely new team after moving to St. Louis; only a few players from the 1973–74 Cougars suited up for the 1974–75 Spirits.

The Spirits were one of two teams that lasted until the very end of the league but did not join the NBA; the other being the Kentucky Colonels. (The Virginia Squires folded after the final ABA regular season ended but before the ABA–NBA merger due to their inability to meet a league-mandated financial assessment after the season ended.) At the time of the ABA–NBA merger, the Spirits' owners planned to move the team to Salt Lake City, Utah to play as the Utah Rockies; instead, its players were dealt in the 1976 ABA dispersal draft.

== Legacy ==
Professional basketball would return to North Carolina in 1988 when the Charlotte Hornets entered the NBA.

Carl Scheer, who won Executive of the Year as a member of the Cougars, would later become the first executive of the NBA's Charlotte Hornets. Cougars point guard Gene Littles would become an assistant coach, an executive, and the second head coach of the Hornets. Larry Brown, who coached the Cougars for two seasons and won Coach of the Year during his tenure, would eventually become head coach of the Charlotte Bobcats.

Two teams in other professional sports leagues include Carolina in their branding: the Carolina Panthers of the National Football League, and the Carolina Hurricanes of the National Hockey League. The former team is based in Charlotte, and the latter team in Raleigh.

Beginning in 2012, the Cougars' uniforms were worn by the Bobcats under the NBA Hardwood Classics moniker.

== Franchise records, awards and honors ==
=== Individual awards ===
Most Valuable Player

- Billy Cunningham – 1973

Coach of the Year

- Larry Brown – 1973

Executive of the Year

- Carl Scheer – 1973

All-ABA First Team

- Bob Verga – 1970
- Billy Cunningham – 1973
- Mack Calvin – 1974

All-ABA Second Team

- Joe Caldwell – 1971
- Mack Calvin – 1973

All-Defensive Team

- Joe Caldwell – 1973
- Ted McClain – 1974

All-Rookie Team

- Dennis Wuycik – 1973

=== All-Star Game ===
All-Star Selections

- Doug Moe – 1970
- Bob Verga – 1970
- Joe Caldwell – 1971, 1973
- Wendell Ladner – 1972
- Jim McDaniels – 1972
- Mack Calvin – 1973, 1974
- Billy Cunningham – 1973
- Ted McClain – 1974

=== Basketball Hall of Famers ===
Carolina Cougars Hall of Famers
Players
No.	Name	Position	Tenure	Inducted
32	Billy Cunningham	F	1972–1974	1986
Coaches
Name		Position	Tenure	Inducted
Larry Brown		Head coach	1972–1974	2002

== Season-by-season records ==
ABA champions	Division champions	Playoff berth

Season	League	Division	Finish	Won	Lost	Win%	Playoffs	Awards
Carolina Cougars
1969–70	ABA	Eastern	3rd	42	42	.500	Lost Division Semifinals (Pacers) 0–4	—
1970–71	ABA	Eastern	6th	34	50	.405	—	—
1971–72	ABA	Eastern	5th	35	49	.417	—	—
1972–73	ABA	Eastern	1st	57	27	.679	Won Division Semifinals (Nets) 4–1; Lost Division Finals (Colonels) 3–4	Billy Cunningham (MVP); Larry Brown (COY); Carl Scheer (EOY)
1973–74	ABA	Eastern	3rd	47	37	.560	Lost Division Semifinals (Colonels) 0–4	—

=== All-time records ===
Statistic	Wins	Losses	Win%
Regular season record	215	205	.512
Postseason record	7	13	.350
Regular and postseason record	222	218	.505
