= American Basketball Association =

Professional basketball league (1967–1976)

American Basketball Association (ABA)
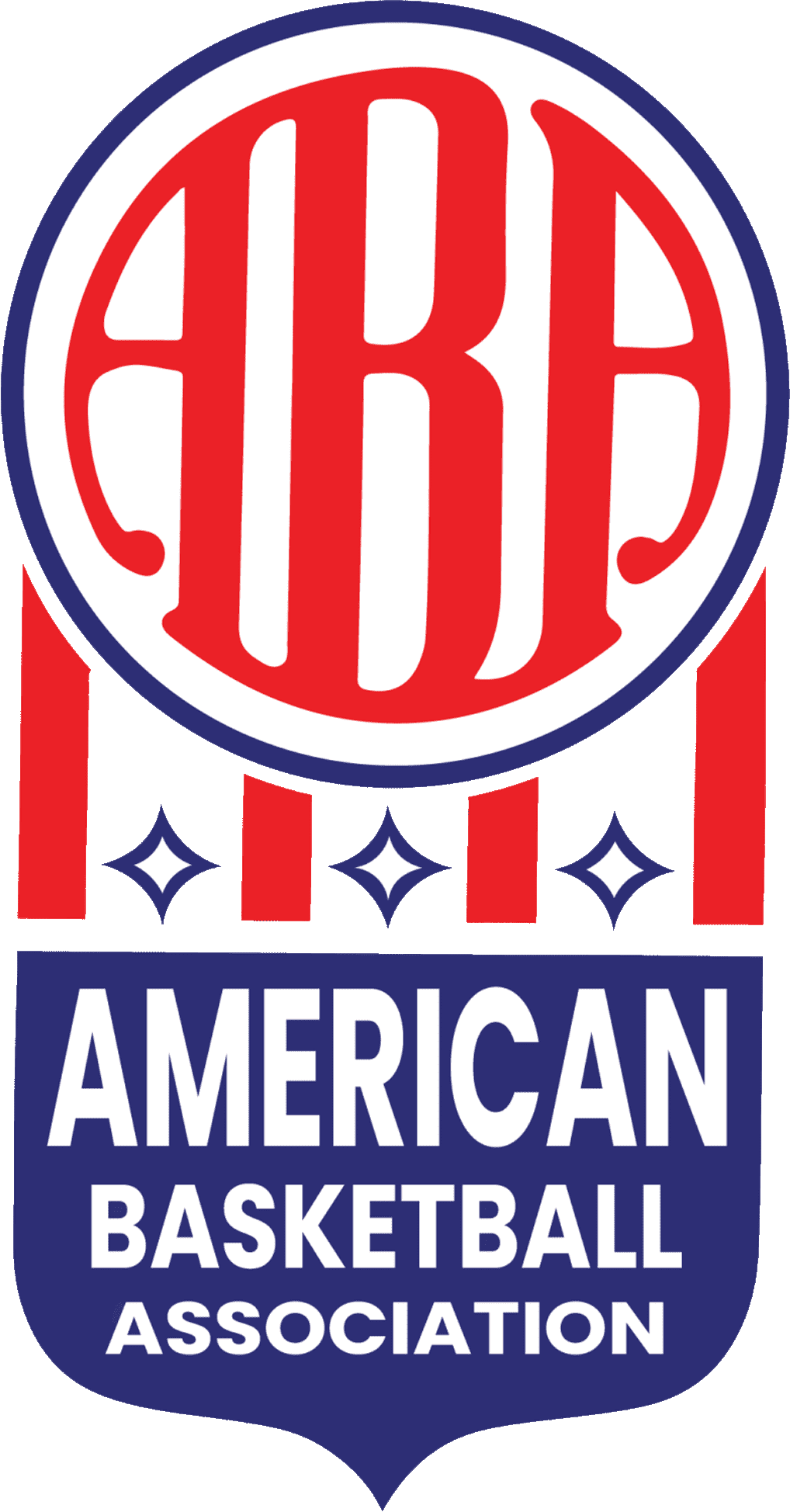
- Logo of the ABA
- Sport: Basketball
- Founded: 1967
- Folded: 1976 (merger)
- No. of teams: 11 (1967–1972); 10 (1972–1975); 9-8 (1975); 7 (1975–1976)
- Country: United States
- Last champion: New York Nets (2nd title)
- Most titles: Indiana Pacers (3 titles)

The American Basketball Association (ABA) was a major professional basketball league that operated for nine seasons from 1967 to 1976. The upstart ABA operated in direct competition with the more established National Basketball Association throughout its existence. The second of two leagues established in the 1960s after the American Basketball League, the ABA was the more successful rival to the NBA.

The league started with eleven teams; the Indiana Pacers, Kentucky Colonels, Minnesota Muskies, New Jersey Americans, and Pittsburgh Pipers were placed in the Eastern Division and the Anaheim Amigos, Dallas Chaparrals, Denver Rockets, Houston Mavericks, New Orleans Buccaneers, and Oakland Oaks in the Western Division. George Mikan served as the first league commissioner and came up with the idea for the three-point shot to go along with a 30-second shot clock. Echoing the NHL, the league named a Most Valuable Player for the entire postseason rather than for just the Finals. Select investors believed they could play their way into getting an NBA franchise by way of a merger, while Mikan did not initially want to get into a bidding war with the NBA for select players.

While the first years of the ABA saw uneven team management (the first two champions immediately relocated after winning the championship), the offense-oriented league managed to attract select talent from players that were either ignored by the NBA, due to perceived talent issues, or because they were not eligible to play in the league. Stars that arose from these circumstances included Roger Brown, Connie Hawkins, and Doug Moe, who each had been blackballed from the NBA due to unfounded allegations of point-shaving; Spencer Haywood, who entered the league as a "hardship exemption" after wanting to turn pro following his sophomore season in college; and Larry Brown, who was thought to be too small to play in the NBA.

The league never had a consistent national television contract, but attracted loyal followings in select markets, most notably in Indianapolis, Denver, San Antonio, Long Island, and Kentucky. The Pacers would win the most championships in league history, winning three with stars such as Mel Daniels, the first player with multiple MVP awards.

The ABA and NBA engaged in talks for a merger as early as 1970, but an antitrust lawsuit filed by the NBA Players Association curtailed the plans for several years. The league went after select NBA stars such as Rick Barry and Billy Cunningham to go along with luring players with a select payment plan by annuity to go along with luring respected NBA referees to the league. In the later years of the league, other stars would arise such as Dan Issel, Artis Gilmore, George Gervin, and Julius Erving. By the end of the 1975–76 season, the league was down to seven teams, with only six surviving long enough to be involved in merger talks. The ABA merged with the NBA in 1976, resulting in four teams (Pacers, Nuggets, Spurs, and Nets) joining the NBA. The final ABA game was played on May 13, 1976, as the New York Nets defeated the Denver Nuggets in six games for the final ABA championship. Adopting the practice of the ABA, the NBA introduced the three-point shot three years later in autumn 1979.

As of 2026, despite the merger of the two leagues, the NBA considers the ABA to be a separate league and its history and statistics are not included in the NBA record books. However, the Basketball Hall of Fame does recognize ABA history and statistics for inductions and honors.

== History ==
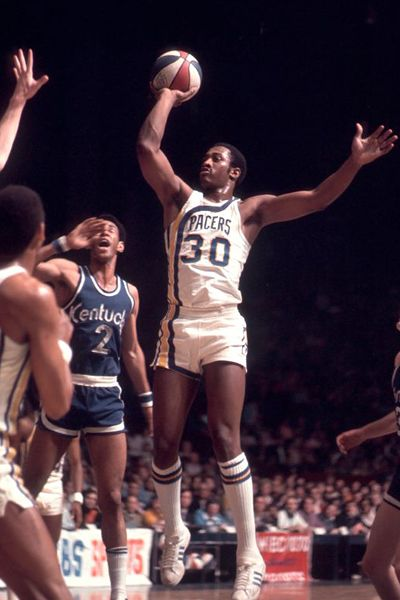
George McGinnis (Indiana Pacers) attempting a shot against the Kentucky Colonels, 1972–73

The league was created as a result of numerous groups coming together in the interest of promotion in sports. Constantine "Connie" Seredin of Professional Sports Management (a company specializing in bringing athletes and advertisers together) had wanted to expand sports marketing and the firm came across the idea of a second pro sports league; noting that basketball had no other professional competition in the 1960s besides the NBA. Seredin called up famed basketball star George Mikan about potentially being an advisor in this theoretical league. While Mikan made no commitment, Seredin left him his phone number just in case. Not long thereafter, Seredin was called by Dennis Murphy, a marketing executive and sports fan that also happened to have called Mikan as well about a sports league. Murphy had initially come up with wanting to secure a football team in Anaheim, California, which led to a group sponsoring a doubleheader game in the city with the American Football League (AFL). But the war that the AFL had with the National Football League would soon come to a close with a merger with no chance of expansion to Anaheim. Not wanting to waste the effort of people who had money and liked sports, Murphy came up with the idea of starting a second basketball league, as it happened to be his favorite sport.

Murphy soon talked with Bill Sharman, who had coached in the last "second basketball league" with the American Basketball League (ABL) (1961–62) and they came up with the name of the league. While Sharman could not get involved with the ABA at the time due to coaching matters, he suggested talking to Mikan along with suggesting the use of the three-point play (an ABL staple). The eventual meeting with Mikan led to his interest along with mentioning other names interested in business. Murphy initially was just interested in having a league devoted to Western cities to cut into the pro market that had only recently put NBA teams in Los Angeles and San Francisco. Seredin and Murphy later met in a meeting with potential investors that only made Murphy have doubts. But John McShane, a public relations man of McShane Associates, found common ground with Seredin to serve as a go-between for Murphy to forge an actual meeting in organizational form in Beverly Hills under the prospective name of the "United Basketball League". The first meeting, at the Beverly Hills Hilton, was held on December 20, 1966 (with the organization going as the "American Basketball Association") that had seen McShane and Seredin leak the meeting to the press to attract attention while Murphy had a few of his associates pose as potential investors. The meeting resulted in a few legitimate investors and later scheduling. It was later that Gary Davidson (an attorney in Orange County) expressed interest in joining the league, while Mark Binstein served as acting president. Don Regan, a law school associate of Davidson, also joined in. On January 31, 1967, two days prior to a potential press conference, Mikan expressed interest in potentially being league commissioner if the terms were correct. On the day of the intended press conference, the "roll call" of franchises were not all filled with actual buyers, as was the case with Dallas, but merely wishes. Kansas City (as envisioned by Murphy), Honolulu (as desired by McShane), and Cleveland were floated as having interest, but none would play in the league (the Kansas City team instead played for different owners in Denver). It was at this time that Seredin and McShane's proposal to be listed in publicity as founders and organizers of the league was denied despite their clear efforts in developing the league.

Eventually, an array of investors were lined up in several cities: James Ackerman & Art Kim in Anaheim, Arthur J. Brown in New York (plans fell through to play in the area), the DeVoe family in Indiana, Gabe Rubin in Pittsburgh, T. C. Morrow in Houston, Mamie and Joe Gregory in Kentucky (after the franchise was first founded by Regan), Ken Davidson in Oakland, Charlie Smither (among others) in New Orleans, Robert Folsom in Dallas, Bill Ringsby in Denver, and Larry Shields in Minnesota. Another investor, in Milwaukee, was initially setup to join the original eleven cities, but that team never materialized for some unknown reason (most likely due to the later creation of the Milwaukee Bucks in the NBA). Mikan agreed to be commissioner and spearheaded the use of a red-white-blue ball to go along with the three-point play. In the press conference on February 2, he stated that while they did not plan to raid the NBA for players, they would invite anyone with no contractual obligations to join and aspired to be a competitor to the league akin to General Motors competing with Ford. It was Mikan who elected to let players such as Brown, Hawkins, Moe, Tony Jackson, and Charlie Williams play in the league, stating years later in Loose Balls that having investigated their situation of being falsely implicated in gambling, each deserved a second chance in his eyes, a decision that Mikan never regretted.

The ABA was conceived at a time stretching from 1960 through the mid-1970s when numerous upstart leagues were challenging, with varying degrees of success, the established major professional sports leagues in the United States. Basketball was seen as particularly vulnerable to a challenge; its major league, the NBA, was the youngest of the Big Four major leagues, having only played 21 seasons to that point, and was still fending off contemporary challenging leagues (it had been less than five years since the ABL shut down); the league, often considered third or fourth in coverage when compared to baseball or football, had just 12 teams at the time the ABA was founded. According to one of the owners of the Indiana Pacers, its goal was to force a merger with the more established league. Potential investors were told that they could get an ABA franchise for half of what it cost to get an NBA expansion franchise at the time. When the merger occurred, ABA officials said their investment would more than double.

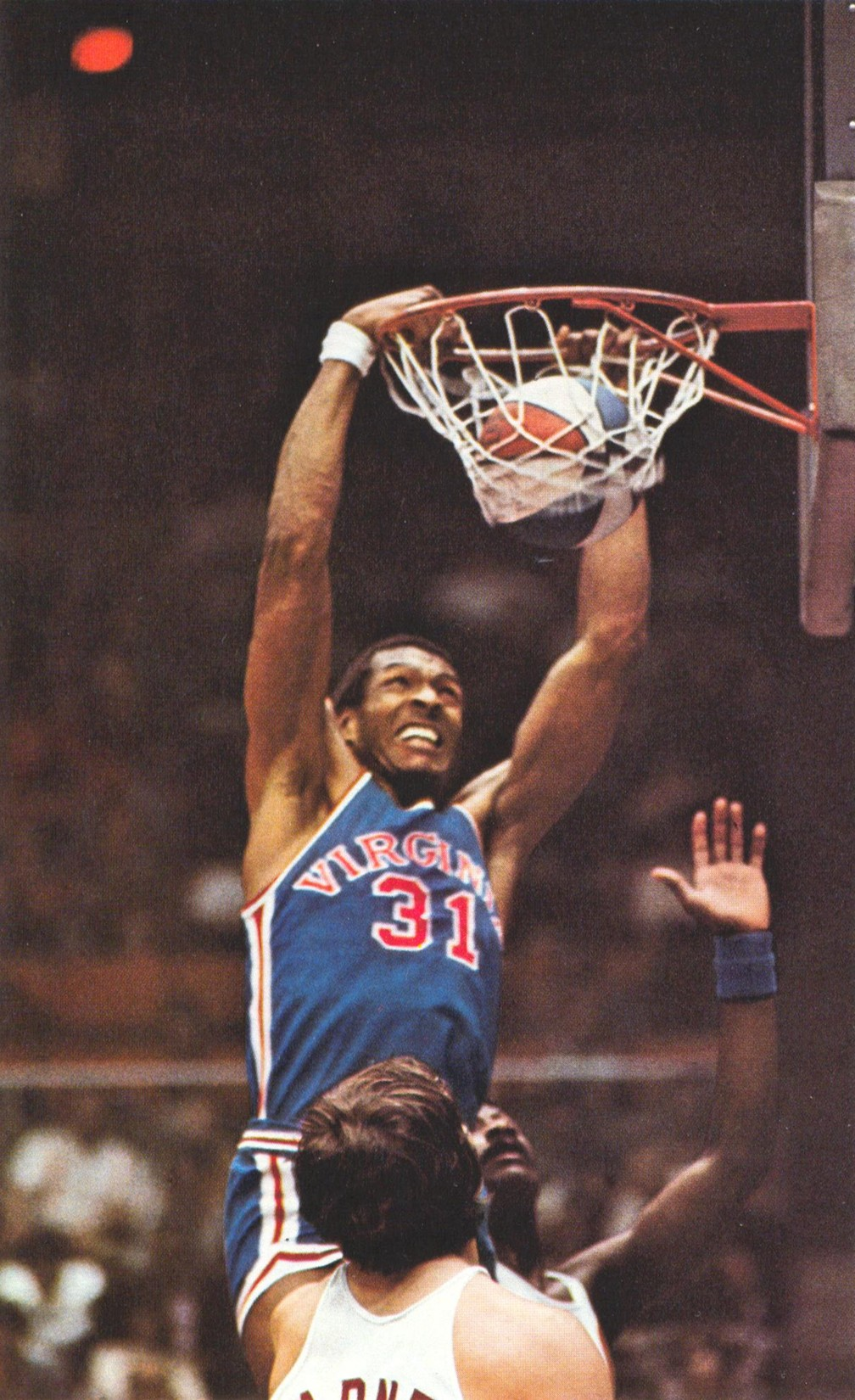
Roger Brown of the Virginia Squires dunking a basketball, c. 1973

The ABA distinguished itself from its older counterpart with a more wide-open, flashy style of offensive play, as well as differences in rules — a 30-second shot clock (as opposed to the NBA's 24-second clock, though the ABA did switch to the 24 second shot clock for the 1975–76 season) and use of a three-point field goal, pioneered in the earlier ABL. Also, the ABA used a colorful red, white, and blue ball, instead of the NBA's traditional orange ball. The ABA also had several "regional" franchises, such as the Virginia Squires and Carolina Cougars, that played "home" games in several cities. The league began with the 1967–68 season on October 13, 1967, with Willie Porter contributing the first points scored on a tip-in for the Oakland Oaks as they defeated the Anaheim Amigos 134–129.

The league's practice of luring players with money would spur a war with the NBA. Under the "Dolgoff Plan" (as first used by the Indiana Pacers), teams would pay a player a certain amount of money over a certain number of years as an annuity (for example, Jim Ard signed a $1.4 million contract with the Nets that saw him paid $250,000 in total from 1970 to 1974 while the team would put $8,000 a year for ten years where Ard would receive $1.15 million paid to him over the course of 24 years, starting in 1989). (Incidentally, the company that created The Dolgoff Plan, which was first operated by former (original) American Basketball League player turned accountant Ralph Dolgoff, would still exist in the present day under the operation of his son, Peter Dolgoff.) Various players, such as Dan Issel and Rick Mount, would be paid in this manner, much to the consternation of jilted executives in the NBA, who even believed the league was paying off agents to help players agree to these contracts, which in select cases was correct. Both leagues went as far as spying to keep tabs on signings. Talks of a merger were floated by 1970, with the two leagues even coming to an agreement that would've had ten ABA teams (all except Virginia) merge with the NBA while making payments to the league for ten years. However, the players association sued in the courts (with Oscar Robertson himself suing the NBA in 1970), stating that actions such as the reserve clause (as strongly defended by NBA owners like Ned Irish) were illegal. The United States Senate Antitrust Subcommittee approved the merger on September 8, 1972, but stated that the reserve clause was illegal. The two leagues soon went back to suing each other and bidding for players.

In the 1973–74 season, the ABA also adopted the no-disqualification foul rule: instead of fouling out after six infractions, when a player is charged with his seventh or succeeding fouls, the opposing team attempts a free throw and retains possession.

The ABA also went after four of the best referees in the NBA: Earl Strom, John Vanak, Norm Drucker, and Joe Gushue, getting them to "jump" leagues by offering them far more in money and benefits. In Earl Strom's memoir Calling the Shots, Strom conveys both the heady sense of being courted by a rival league with money to burn — and also the depression that set in the next year when he began refereeing in the ABA, with less prominent players performing in inadequate arenas, in front of very small crowds. Nevertheless, the emergence of the ABA boosted the salaries of referees just as it did the salaries of players.

However, ABA teams like the Nets, Colonels, Pacers, Spurs, Nuggets, and Stars, especially in later seasons, registered higher attendance on average than most NBA teams at that time (excluding the Lakers, Knicks, Celtics, SuperSonics, and Bucks).

The freewheeling style of the ABA eventually caught on with fans, but the lack of a national television contract and protracted financial losses would spell doom for the ABA as an independent circuit. Before the 1975–76 season, the Nuggets and Nets filed applications to join the NBA, but their overtures were rejected. The Robertson suit was finally settled in February 1976 that removed a stumbling block for a merger talk. In 1976, its last year of existence, the ABA pioneered the now-popular slam dunk contest at its all-star game in Denver.

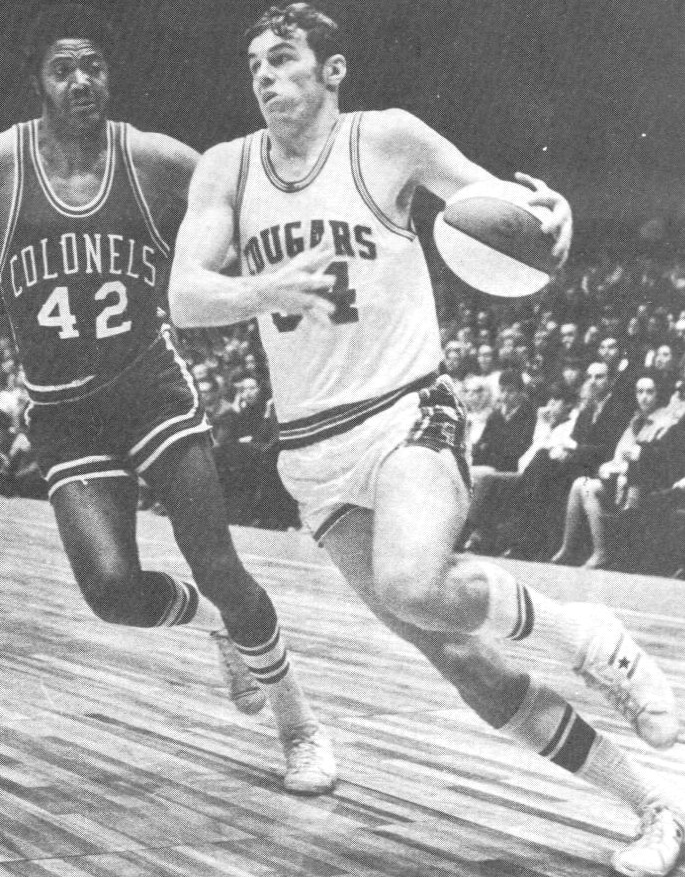
Doug Moe of the Carolina Cougars, 1969–70

The league succeeded in forcing a merger with the NBA in the 1976 offseason, albeit at a high price. Four ABA teams were absorbed into the older league: the New York Nets, Denver Nuggets, Indiana Pacers, and San Antonio Spurs. As part of the merger agreement, the four teams were not permitted to participate in the 1976 NBA draft. The merger was particularly hard on the Nets; the New York Knicks were firmly established in their arena, Madison Square Garden, and would not permit the Nets to share dates there. For drawing audience away from the Knicks, the Nets were forced to pay $4.8 million to the Knicks organization. The Nets offered league superstar Julius Erving instead, but the Knicks declined. The Nets had to settle for an arena in Piscataway, New Jersey, and to meet expenses were forced to sell the contract of Erving to the Philadelphia 76ers. The four teams were also denied national television contract money for the next three seasons.

Two other clubs, the Kentucky Colonels and the Spirits of St. Louis, were disbanded upon the merger, with each getting a buyout: the Colonels received a one-time buyout that owner John Y. Brown, Jr. used to purchase the NBA's Buffalo Braves, while the Spirits owners (most significantly lawyer Donald Schupak) negotiated a cut of the other ABA teams' television revenues in perpetuity. This deal netted the ownership group of the Spirits over $300 million over nearly four decades due to a large increase in television revenues. In 2014, the NBA and the Spirits ownership agreed to phase out future payments in exchange for a one-time payment of $500 million, making the total value for the deal over $800 million. The seventh remaining team, the Virginia Squires, received nothing, as they had ceased operations shortly before the merger. The players from the Colonels, Spirits, and Squires were made available to NBA teams through a dispersal draft; the four teams absorbed by the NBA were allowed to choose players from this draft, albeit with all NBA teams picking by the inverse order of their win-loss percentages.

One of the more significant long-term contributions of the ABA to professional basketball was to tap into markets in the southeast that had been collegiate basketball hotbeds (including North Carolina, Virginia, and Kentucky). The NBA was focused on the urban areas of the Northeast, Midwest, and West Coast. At the time, it showed no interest in placing a team south of Washington, D.C., other than the Atlanta metropolitan area, where the NBA's Hawks franchise relocated from St. Louis in 1968.

=== Commissioners ===
- George Mikan 1967–1969
- James Carson Gardner 1969 (interim)
- Jack Dolph 1969–1972
- Bob Carlson 1972–1973
- Mike Storen 1973–74
- Tedd Munchak 1974–75
- Dave DeBusschere 1975–76

NBA great Mikan was the first commissioner of the ABA, where he introduced both the 3-point line and the league's trademark red, white, and blue basketball. Mikan resigned in 1969. DeBusschere, one of the stars of the New York Knicks championship teams, moved from his job as vice president and GM of the ABA's New York Nets in 1975 to become the last commissioner of the ABA and facilitate the ABA–NBA merger in 1976.

=== Spencer Haywood Hardship Rule ===
One of the primary contributions of the ABA to modern NBA was the introduction of the Spencer Haywood Hardship Rule, which would later become the framework for the current NBA draft eligibility system that allows players to declare for the NBA after being one year removed from their high school graduation. The origin of the Hardship Rule was a result of the NBA prohibiting players from joining the league until they had completed their four years of college eligibility.

In 1969, Spencer Haywood left the University of Detroit as a sophomore and signed with the Denver Rockets. The ABA believed that in extenuating circumstances, such as a financial situation or familial needs, players should be able to leave for professional leagues early. While the NBA and NCAA initially contested the rule, after the courts ruled in favor of Haywood playing in the ABA, the NBA followed suit and relaxed the four year rule to allow players to enter the league if they qualified as a hardship on the basis of "financial condition...family, [or] academic record." Haywood paved the way for other players to enter the ABA before they had completed their collegiate careers, such as George McGinnis and Julius Erving. Today, the "one-and-done" rule in the NBA can be traced back to the ABA's decision to allow players to leave college early and pursue a professional career before they had completed their collegiate careers.

=== Slam Dunk Contest ===
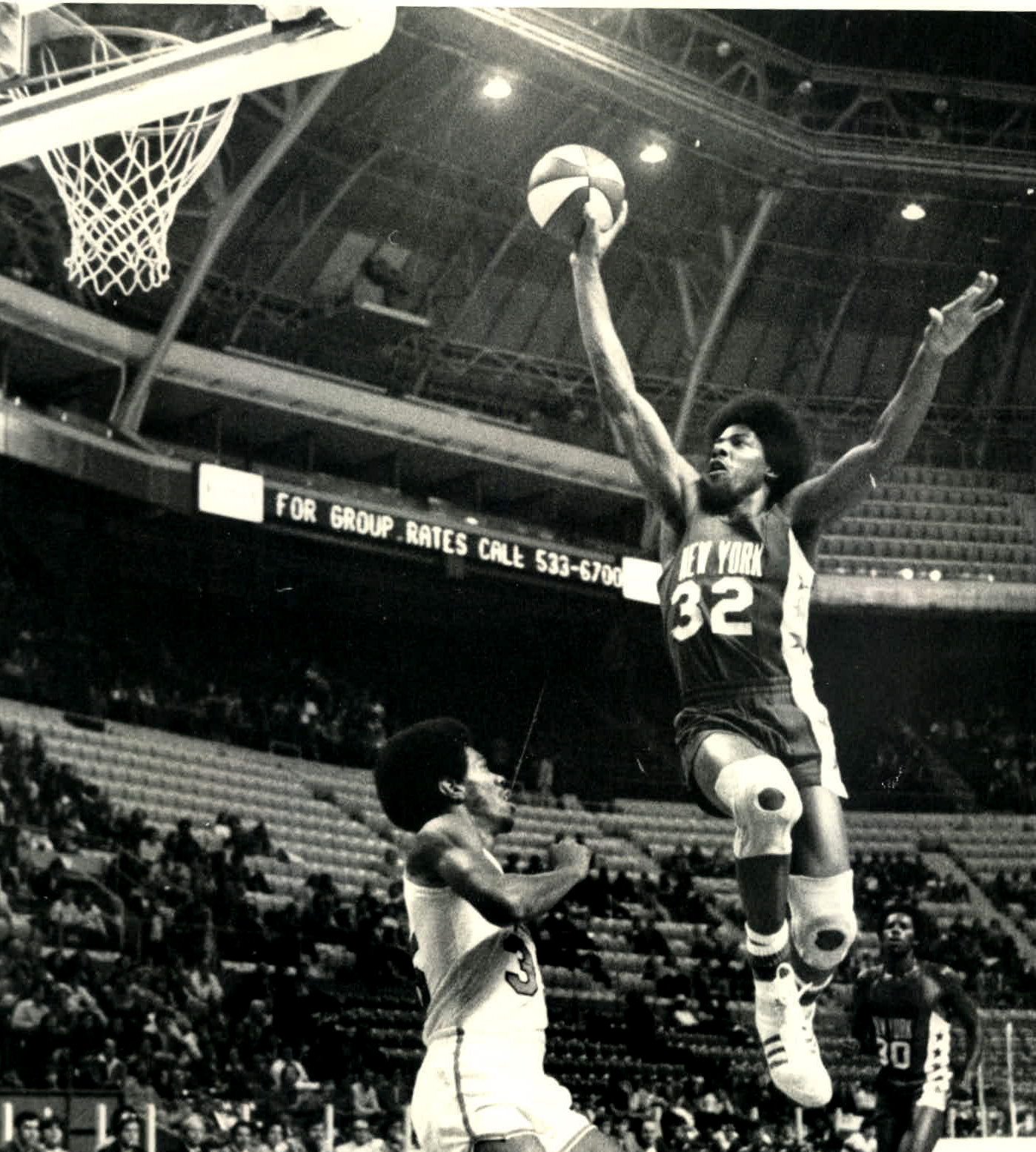
Julius Erving performing a slam dunk against the Spirits of St. Louis, 1974

The ABA pioneered the advent of the now popular NBA slam dunk contest at the final ABA All-Star Game in 1976. The game was held in Denver, and the owners of the ABA teams wanted to ensure that the event would be entertaining for the sellout crowd of 15,021 people. The ABA and NBA had begun to discuss a possible merger, and the ABA owners wanted to establish the viability and success of their league. The Dunk Contest operated as a means of unique entertainment that displayed the style and excitement that the ABA players brought to the game. The dunk contest was held at halftime of the All-Star game and the contestants were Artis Gilmore, George Gervin, David Thompson, Larry Kenon, and Julius Erving. The winner of the contest received $1,000 and a stereo system. Julius Erving went on to win the competition by completing the now famous free throw line dunk. The Slam Dunk Contest would make its way to the NBA in 1976–77 as a season-long competition for that season only, and on a permanent basis as a standalone event as part of the NBA All-Star Weekend in 1984.

== Teams ==
Of the original 11 teams, only the Kentucky Colonels and Indiana Pacers remained for all nine seasons without relocating, changing team names, or folding. However, the Denver Larks/Rockets/Nuggets, a team that had been planned for Kansas City, Missouri, moved to Denver without playing a game in Kansas City due to the lack of a suitable arena. In addition to the four surviving ABA teams, eight current NBA markets have ABA heritage: Charlotte, Dallas, Houston, Memphis, Miami, Minnesota, New Orleans, and Utah all had an ABA team before their current NBA teams.

Overview of American Basketball Association teams
| | Franchise | City | Arena | Years | Fate |
|---|---|---|---|---|---|
| 1 | Anaheim Amigos | Anaheim, California | Anaheim Convention Center | 1967–1968 | Folded, 1975 |
| 1 | Los Angeles Stars | Los Angeles, California | Los Angeles Memorial Sports Arena | 1968–1970 | Folded, 1975 |
| 1 | Utah Stars | Salt Lake City, Utah | The Salt Palace | 1970–1975 | Folded, 1975 |
| 2 | Dallas Chaparrals | Dallas, Texas | Dallas Memorial Auditorium | 1967–1970; 1971–1973 | Joined the NBA, 1976 |
| 2 | Dallas Chaparrals | University Park, Texas | Moody Coliseum | 1967–1970; 1971–1973 | Joined the NBA, 1976 |
| 2 | Texas Chaparrals | Dallas, Texas | Dallas Memorial Auditorium | 1970–1971 | Joined the NBA, 1976 |
| 2 | Texas Chaparrals | University Park, Texas | Moody Coliseum | 1970–1971 | Joined the NBA, 1976 |
| 2 | Texas Chaparrals | Fort Worth, Texas | Tarrant County Convention Center | 1970–1971 | Joined the NBA, 1976 |
| 2 | Texas Chaparrals | Lubbock, Texas | Lubbock Municipal Coliseum | 1970–1971 | Joined the NBA, 1976 |
| 2 | San Antonio Spurs | San Antonio, Texas | HemisFair Arena | 1973–1976 | Joined the NBA, 1976 |
| 3 | Houston Mavericks | Houston, Texas | Sam Houston Coliseum | 1967–1969 | Folded, 1976 (NBA buyout) |
| 3 | Carolina Cougars | Greensboro, North Carolina | Greensboro Coliseum | 1969–1974 | Folded, 1976 (NBA buyout) |
| 3 | Carolina Cougars | Charlotte, North Carolina | Charlotte Coliseum | 1969–1974 | Folded, 1976 (NBA buyout) |
| 3 | Carolina Cougars | Raleigh, North Carolina | Dorton Arena | 1969–1974 | Folded, 1976 (NBA buyout) |
| 3 | Carolina Cougars | Raleigh, North Carolina | Reynolds Coliseum | 1969–1974 | Folded, 1976 (NBA buyout) |
| 3 | Spirits of St. Louis | St. Louis, Missouri | St. Louis Arena | 1974–1976 | Folded, 1976 (NBA buyout) |
| 4 | Indiana Pacers | Indianapolis, Indiana | Indiana State Fair Coliseum | 1967–1974 | Joined the NBA, 1976 |
| 4 | Indiana Pacers | Indianapolis, Indiana | Market Square Arena | 1974–1976 | Joined the NBA, 1976 |
| 5 | Kansas City (unnamed) | Kansas City, Missouri | Never played under this name | 1967 | Joined the NBA, 1976 |
| 5 | Denver Larks | Denver, Colorado | Never played under this name | 1967 | Joined the NBA, 1976 |
| 5 | Denver Rockets | Denver, Colorado | Denver Auditorium Arena & Denver Coliseum | 1967–1974 | Joined the NBA, 1976 |
| 5 | Denver Nuggets | Denver, Colorado | Denver Auditorium Arena & Denver Coliseum | 1974–1975 | Joined the NBA, 1976 |
| 5 | Denver Nuggets | Denver, Colorado | McNichols Sports Arena | 1975–1976 | Joined the NBA, 1976 |
| 6 | Kentucky Colonels | Louisville, Kentucky | Louisville Convention Center | 1967–1970 | Folded, 1976 (NBA buyout) |
| 6 | Kentucky Colonels | Louisville, Kentucky | Freedom Hall | 1970–1976 | Folded, 1976 (NBA buyout) |
| 7 | Minnesota Muskies | Bloomington, Minnesota | Metropolitan Sports Center | 1967–1968 | Folded, 1972 |
| 7 | Miami Floridians | Miami Beach, Florida | Miami Beach Convention Center | 1968–1969 | Folded, 1972 |
| 7 | Miami Floridians | Miami, Florida | Dinner Key Auditorium | 1969–1970 | Folded, 1972 |
| 7 | Miami Floridians | Miami, Florida | Miami Dade College | 1969–1970 | Folded, 1972 |
| 7 | The Floridians | Miami Beach, Florida | Miami Beach Convention Center | 1970–1972 | Folded, 1972 |
| 7 | The Floridians | Tampa, Florida | Curtis Hixon Hall | 1970–1972 | Folded, 1972 |
| 7 | The Floridians | St. Petersburg, Florida | Bayfront Center | 1970–1972 | Folded, 1972 |
| 7 | The Floridians | Jacksonville, Florida | Jacksonville Coliseum | 1970–1972 | Folded, 1972 |
| 7 | The Floridians | West Palm Beach, Florida | West Palm Beach Auditorium | 1970–1972 | Folded, 1972 |
| 8 | New Orleans Buccaneers | New Orleans, Louisiana | Loyola Field House | 1967–1969 | Folded, 1975 |
| 8 | New Orleans Buccaneers | New Orleans, Louisiana | New Orleans Municipal Auditorium | 1969–1970 | Folded, 1975 |
| 8 | New Orleans Buccaneers | New Orleans, Louisiana | Tulane Gym | 1969–1970 | Folded, 1975 |
| 8 | Louisiana Buccaneers | New Orleans, Louisiana | Never played under this name | 1970 | Folded, 1975 |
| 8 | Memphis Pros | Memphis, Tennessee | Mid-South Coliseum | 1970–1972 | Folded, 1975 |
| 8 | Memphis Tams | Memphis, Tennessee | Mid-South Coliseum | 1972–1974 | Folded, 1975 |
| 8 | Memphis Sounds | Memphis, Tennessee | Mid-South Coliseum | 1974–1975 | Folded, 1975 |
| 8 | Baltimore Hustlers | Baltimore, Maryland | Never played under this name | 1975 | Folded, 1975 |
| 8 | Baltimore Claws | Baltimore, Maryland | Folded after three preseason games | 1975 | Folded, 1975 |
| 9 | New York / New Jersey Americans | Teaneck, New Jersey | Teaneck Armory | 1967–1968 | Joined the NBA, 1976, name changed to reflect move to New Jersey (1977), known as Brooklyn Nets since 2012. |
| 9 | New York Nets | Commack, New York | Long Island Arena | 1968–1969 | Joined the NBA, 1976, name changed to reflect move to New Jersey (1977), known as Brooklyn Nets since 2012. |
| 9 | New York Nets | West Hempstead, New York | Island Garden | 1969–1972 | Joined the NBA, 1976, name changed to reflect move to New Jersey (1977), known as Brooklyn Nets since 2012. |
| 9 | New York Nets | Uniondale, New York | Nassau Veterans Memorial Coliseum | 1972–1976 | Joined the NBA, 1976, name changed to reflect move to New Jersey (1977), known as Brooklyn Nets since 2012. |
| 10 | Oakland Americans | Oakland, California | Never played under this name | 1967 | Folded, 1976 (prior to merger) |
| 10 | Oakland Oaks | Oakland, California | Oakland–Alameda County Coliseum Arena | 1967–1969 | Folded, 1976 (prior to merger) |
| 10 | Washington Caps | Washington, D.C. | Washington Coliseum | 1969–1970 | Folded, 1976 (prior to merger) |
| 10 | Virginia Squires | Hampton, Virginia | Hampton Roads Coliseum | 1970–1976 | Folded, 1976 (prior to merger) |
| 10 | Virginia Squires | Norfolk, Virginia | Old Dominion University Fieldhouse | 1970–1971 | Folded, 1976 (prior to merger) |
| 10 | Virginia Squires | Roanoke, Virginia | Roanoke Civic Center | 1971–1972 | Folded, 1976 (prior to merger) |
| 10 | Virginia Squires | Richmond, Virginia | Richmond Coliseum | 1971–1976 | Folded, 1976 (prior to merger) |
| 10 | Virginia Squires | Norfolk, Virginia | Norfolk Scope | 1971–1976 | Folded, 1976 (prior to merger) |
| 11 | Pittsburgh Pipers | Pittsburgh, Pennsylvania | Pittsburgh Civic Arena | 1967–1968; 1969–1970 | Folded, 1972 |
| 11 | Minnesota Pipers | Bloomington, Minnesota | Metropolitan Sports Center | 1968–1969 | Folded, 1972 |
| 11 | Pittsburgh Pioneers | Pittsburgh, Pennsylvania | Never played under this name | 1970 | Folded, 1972 |
| 11 | Pittsburgh Condors | Pittsburgh, Pennsylvania | Pittsburgh Civic Arena | 1970–1972 | Folded, 1972 |
| 12 | San Diego Conquistadors | San Diego, California | Peterson Gymnasium | 1972–1973 | Folded, 1975 |
| 12 | San Diego Conquistadors | San Diego, California | Golden Hall | 1973–1974 | Folded, 1975 |
| 12 | San Diego Conquistadors | San Diego, California | San Diego Sports Arena | 1974–1975 | Folded, 1975 |
| 12 | San Diego Sails | San Diego, California | San Diego Sports Arena | 1975 | Folded, 1975 |

== Champions ==
| **Bold** | Winning team of the ABA championship |
| Italics | Team with home-court advantage |
| Team (X, Y-Z) | Denotes number of times team has played in the championship (X) and record afterwards (Y–Z) |

| Year | Western Champion | Coach | Result | Eastern Champion | Coach | Reference |
|---|---|---|---|---|---|---|
| 1968 | New Orleans Buccaneers (1, 0–1) | Babe McCarthy | 3–4 | **Pittsburgh Pipers** (1, 1–0) | Vince Cazzetta | |
| 1969 | **Oakland Oaks** (1, 1–0) | Alex Hannum | 4–1 | Indiana Pacers (1, 0–1) | Bobby Leonard | |
| 1970 | Los Angeles Stars (1, 0–1) | Bill Sharman | 2–4 | **Indiana Pacers** (2, 1–1) | Bobby Leonard | |
| 1971 | **Utah Stars** (2, 1–1) | Bill Sharman | 4–3 | Kentucky Colonels (1, 0–1) | Frank Ramsey | |
| 1972 | **Indiana Pacers** (2) (Note: The Pacers moved from the Eastern Division to the Western Division following the 1969–70 season.) (3, 2–1) | Bobby Leonard | 4–2 | New York Nets (1, 0–1) | Lou Carnesecca | |
| 1973 | **Indiana Pacers** (3) (4, 3–1) | Bobby Leonard | 4–3 | Kentucky Colonels (2, 0–2) | Joe Mullaney | |
| 1974 | Utah Stars (3, 1–2) | Joe Mullaney | 1–4 | **New York Nets** (2, 1–1) | Kevin Loughery | |
| 1975 | Indiana Pacers (5, 3–2) | Bobby Leonard | 1–4 | **Kentucky Colonels** (3, 1–2) | Hubie Brown | |

With the ABA cut down to seven teams by the middle of its final season, the league abandoned divisional play.

| Year | Higher seed | Coach | Result | Lower seed | Coach | Reference |
|---|---|---|---|---|---|---|
| 1976 | Denver Nuggets (1, 0–1) | Larry Brown | 2–4 | **New York Nets** (2) (3, 2–1) | Kevin Loughery | |

== All-Time Team ==
In 1997, an All-Time Team was selected by a panel of 50 ABA sportswriters, radio announcers, referees, executives, owners, and fans. The top 10 players are shown below, seven being unanimous selections with 50 votes.

| Rank | Player | Position | ABA Years | Votes |
|---|---|---|---|---|
| 1 | Roger Brown | Forward | 1967–1975 | 50 |
| 1 | Louie Dampier | Guard | 1967–1976 | 50 |
| 1 | Mel Daniels | Center | 1967–1975 | 50 |
| 1 | Julius Erving | Forward | 1971–1976 | 50 |
| 1 | George Gervin | Guard/ Forward | 1972–1976 | 50 |
| 1 | Artis Gilmore | Center | 1971–1976 | 50 |
| 1 | Dan Issel | Forward | 1970–1976 | 50 |
| 8 | George McGinnis | Forward | 1971–1975 | 44 |
| 9 | Zelmo Beaty | Center | 1970–1974 | 42 |
| 10 | Mack Calvin | Guard | 1969–1976 | 41 |

== Other prominent players ==
- Bird Averitt
- Marvin Barnes
- John Barnhill
- Mike Barrett
- Rick Barry
- John Beasley
- Byron Beck
- Art Becker
- Ron Boone
- Gary Bradds
- John Brisker
- Larry Brown
- Don Buse
- Joe Caldwell
- Larry Cannon
- M.L. Carr
- Darel Carrier
- George Carter
- Don Chaney
- Jim Chones
- Glen Combs
- Billy Cunningham
- Warren Davis
- Randy Denton
- Mike D'Antoni
- Jim Eakins
- Donnie Freeman
- Mike Gale
- Gus Gerard
- Gerald Govan
- Travis Grant
- Mike Green
- Cliff Hagan
- Julian Hammond
- Ira Harge
- Jerry Harkness
- Connie Hawkins
- Spencer Haywood
- Art Heyman
- Wayne Hightower
- Darnell Hillman
- Les Hunter
- George Irvine
- Warren Jabali
- Mervin Jackson
- Tony Jackson
- Gus Johnson
- Stew Johnson
- Bobby Jones
- Caldwell Jones
- Jimmy Jones
- Larry Jones
- Rich Jones
- Steve Jones
- Will Jones
- George Karl
- Billy Keller
- Larry Kenon
- Julius Keye
- Billy Knight
- Wendell Ladner
- Bo Lamar
- Manny Leaks
- George Lehmann
- Freddie Lewis
- Mike Lewis
- Goose Ligon
- Maurice Lucas
- Randy Mahaffey
- Moses Malone
- Ted McClain
- Jim McDaniels
- Bill Melchionni
- Larry Miller
- Doug Moe
- Gene Moore
- Jackie Moreland
- Rick Mount
- Willie Murrell
- Swen Nater
- Bob Netolicky
- Johnny Neumann
- Mark Olberding
- Tom Owens
- Billy Paultz
- Cincy Powell
- Craig Raymond
- Red Robbins
- Flynn Robinson
- Dave Robisch
- John Roche
- Dan Roundfield
- Charlie Scott
- Ray Scott
- Les Selvage
- Don Sidle
- James Silas
- Walt Simon
- Ralph Simpson
- Al Smith
- Willie Somerset
- George Stone
- Skeeter Swift
- Levern Tart
- Brian Taylor
- Fatty Taylor
- David Thompson
- George Thompson
- Skip Thoren
- Dave Twardzik
- Chico Vaughn
- Bob Verga
- Trooper Washington
- Marvin Webster
- Charlie Williams
- Chuck Williams
- Fly Williams
- John Williamson
- Willie Wise

== Prominent coaches ==
- LaDell Andersen
- Bob Bass
- Al Bianchi
- Joe Belmont
- Hubie Brown
- Larry Brown
- Lou Carnesecca
- Vince Cazzetta
- Wilt Chamberlain
- Cliff Hagan
- Alex Hannum
- Buddy Jeannette
- K. C. Jones
- Slick Leonard
- Kevin Loughery
- Bob MacKinnon
- Slater Martin
- Babe McCarthy
- John McLendon
- Jack McMahon
- Vern Mikkelsen
- Joe Mullaney
- Tom Nissalke
- Jim Pollard
- Gene Rhodes
- Bill Sharman
- Rod Thorn

== Season leaders ==
| * | Elected to the Naismith Memorial Basketball Hall of Fame |

=== Scoring leaders ===
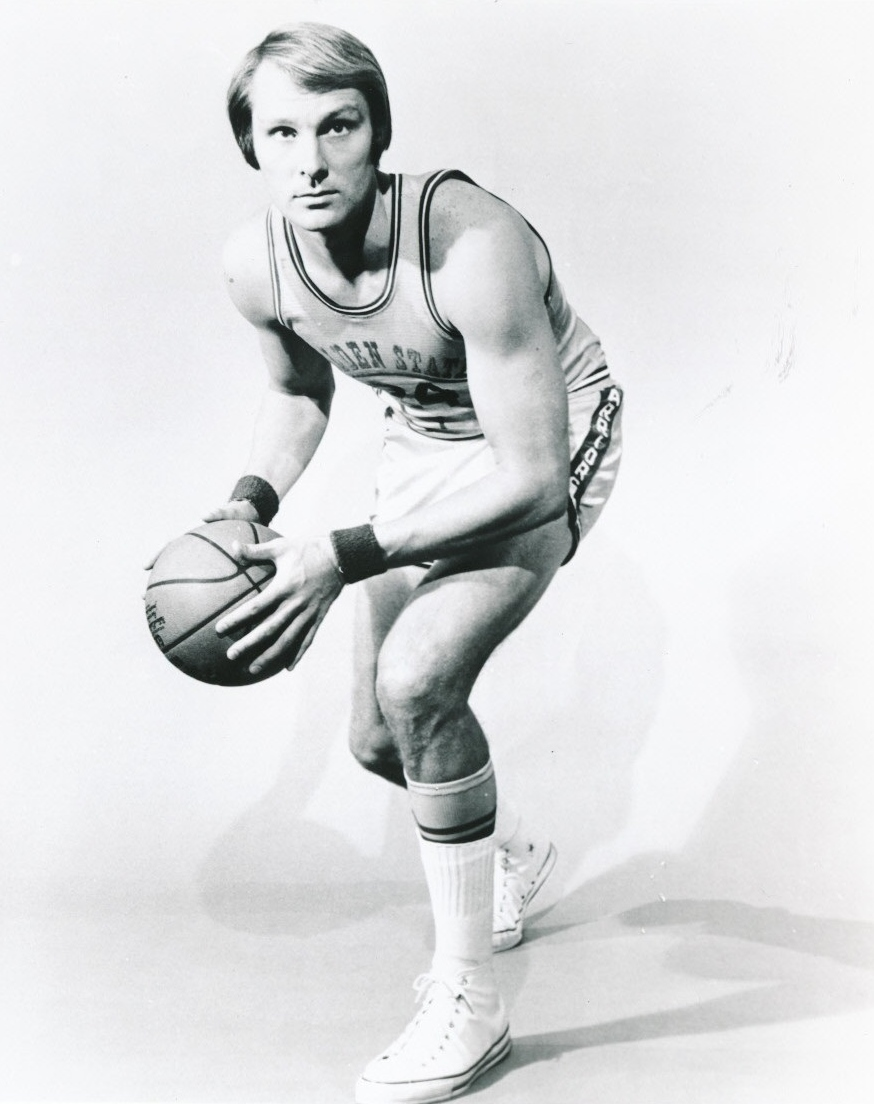
Hall of Famer Rick Barry played for the ABA's Oakland Oaks

| Season | Player | Team(s) | Games played | Points | Points per game |
|---|---|---|---|---|---|
| 1967–68 | Connie Hawkins* | Pittsburgh Pipers | 70 | 1,875 | 26.8 |
| 1968–69 | Rick Barry* | Oakland Oaks | 35 | 1,190 | 34.0 |
| 1969–70 | Spencer Haywood* | Denver Rockets | 84 | 2,519 | 30.0 |
| 1970–71 | Dan Issel* | Kentucky Colonels | 83 | 2,480 | 29.9 |
| 1971–72 | Charlie Scott* | Virginia Squires | 73 | 2,524 | 34.6 |
| 1972–73 | Julius Erving* | Virginia Squires | 71 | 2,268 | 31.9 |
| 1973–74 | Julius Erving* (2) | New York Nets | 84 | 2,299 | 27.4 |
| 1974–75 | George McGinnis* | Indiana Pacers | 79 | 2,353 | 29.8 |
| 1975–76 | Julius Erving* (3) | New York Nets | 84 | 2,462 | 29.3 |

=== Rebounding leaders ===
| Season | Player | Team(s) | Games played | Offensive rebounds | Defensive rebounds | Total rebounds | Rebounds per game |
|---|---|---|---|---|---|---|---|
| 1967–68 | Mel Daniels* | Minnesota Muskies | 78 | 502 | 711 | 1,213 | 15.6 |
| 1968–69 | Mel Daniels* (2) | Indiana Pacers | 76 | 383 | 873 | 1,256 | 16.5 |
| 1969–70 | Spencer Haywood* | Denver Rockets | 84 | 533 | 1,104 | 1,637 | 19.5 |
| 1970–71 | Mel Daniels* (3) | Indiana Pacers | 82 | 394 | 1,081 | 1,475 | 18.0 |
| 1971–72 | Artis Gilmore* | Kentucky Colonels | 84 | 421 | 1,070 | 1,491 | 17.8 |
| 1972–73 | Artis Gilmore* (2) | Kentucky Colonels | 84 | 449 | 1,027 | 1,476 | 17.6 |
| 1973–74 | Artis Gilmore* (3) | Kentucky Colonels | 84 | 478 | 1,060 | 1,538 | 18.3 |
| 1974–75 | Swen Nater | San Antonio Spurs | 78 | 369 | 910 | 1,279 | 16.4 |
| 1975–76 | Artis Gilmore* (4) | Kentucky Colonels | 84 | 402 | 901 | 1,303 | 15.5 |

=== Assists leaders ===
| Season | Player | Team(s) | Games played | Assists | Assists per game |
|---|---|---|---|---|---|
| 1967–68 | Larry Brown* | New Orleans Buccaneers | 78 | 506 | 6.5 |
| 1968–69 | Larry Brown* (2) | Oakland Oaks | 77 | 544 | 7.1 |
| 1969–70 | Larry Brown* (3) | Washington Caps | 82 | 580 | 7.1 |
| 1970–71 | Bill Melchionni | New York Nets | 81 | 672 | 8.3 |
| 1971–72 | Bill Melchionni (2) | New York Nets | 80 | 669 | 8.4 |
| 1972–73 | Bill Melchionni (3) | New York Nets | 61 | 453 | 7.4 |
| 1973–74 | Al Smith | Denver Rockets | 76 | 619 | 8.1 |
| 1974–75 | Mack Calvin | Denver Nuggets | 74 | 570 | 7.7 |
| 1975–76 | Don Buse | Indiana Pacers | 84 | 689 | 8.2 |

=== Steals leaders ===
| Season | Player | Team(s) | Games played | Steals | Steals per game |
|---|---|---|---|---|---|
| 1972–73 | Fatty Taylor | Virginia Squires | 78 | 210 | 2.69 |
| 1973–74 | Ted McClain | Denver Rockets | 84 | 250 | 2.98 |
| 1974–75 | Brian Taylor | New York Nets | 79 | 221 | 2.80 |
| 1975–76 | Don Buse | Indiana Pacers | 84 | 346 | 4.12 |

=== Blocks leaders ===
| Season | Player | Team(s) | Games played | Blocks | Blocks per game |
|---|---|---|---|---|---|
| 1971–72 | Artis Gilmore | Kentucky Colonels | 84 | 422 | 5.02 |
| 1972–73 | Artis Gilmore (2) | Kentucky Colonels | 84 | 259 | 3.08 |
| 1973–74 | Caldwell Jones | San Diego Conquistadors | 79 | 316 | 4.00 |
| 1974–75 | Caldwell Jones (2) | San Diego Conquistadors | 76 | 246 | 3.24 |
| 1975–76 | Billy Paultz | San Antonio Spurs | 83 | 253 | 3.05 |

== Awards and broadcasters ==
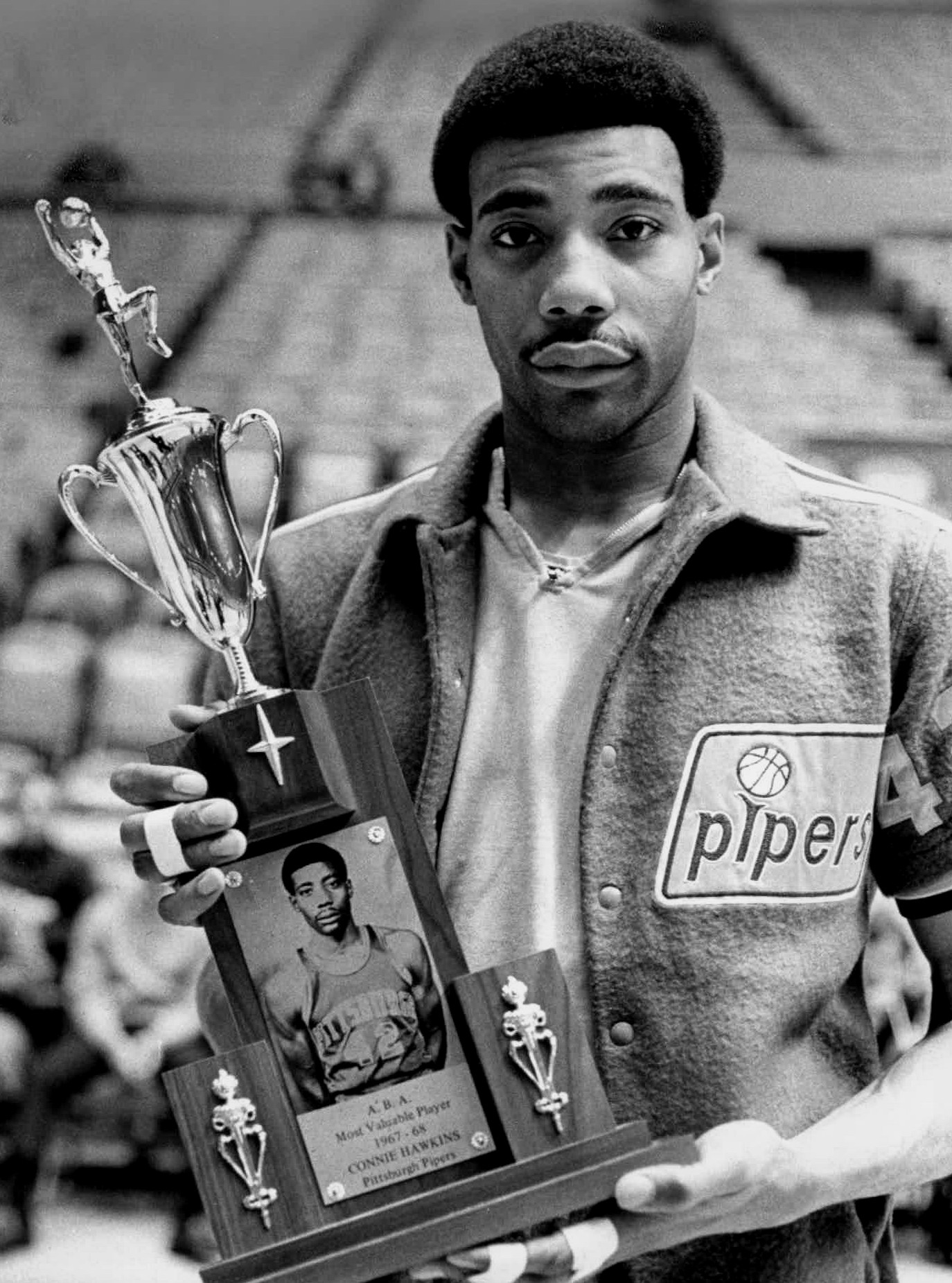
Connie Hawkins of the Pittsburgh Pipers won the 1967–68 ABA MVP award

== Succession ==
In 1999, a new league calling itself the ABA 2000 was established. The new league uses a similar red, white, and blue basketball as the old ABA, but unlike the original ABA, it does not feature players of similar caliber to the NBA, nor does it play games in major arenas or on television as the original ABA did.

== See also ==
- ABA–NBA merger
- ABA All-Star Game
- American Basketball Association (2000–present)
- List of defunct sports leagues
- Loose Balls, a 1990 book about the history of the ABA written by Terry Pluto
- Semi-Pro, a 2008 comedy film about the ABA starring Will Ferrell
- World Hockey Association, another league that intended to compete with its professional counterpart, the NHL, and eventually merged with that league
- American Football League, another league that intended to compete with its professional counterpart, the NFL, and eventually merged with that league
