= Ron Franz =

American basketball player (1945–2022)

Personal information
- Born: October 20, 1945 Kansas City, Kansas, U.S.
- Died: October 3, 2022 (aged 76) Fort Walton Beach, Florida, U.S.
- Listed height: 6 ft 7 in (2.01 m)
- Listed weight: 205 lb (93 kg)

Career information
- High school: Bishop Ward (Kansas City, Kansas)
- College: Kansas (1964–1967)
- NBA draft: 1967: 4th round, 33rd overall pick
- Drafted by: Detroit Pistons
- Playing career: 1967–1975
- Position: Small forward
- Number: 11, 15

Career history
- 1967–1968: Oakland Oaks
- 1968–1970: New Orleans Buccaneers
- 1970–1972: Floridians
- 1972: Memphis Tams
- 1973: Dallas Chaparrals
- 1975: Swiss Alpines
- Stats at Basketball Reference

Ronald Stephen Franz (October 20, 1945 – October 3, 2022) was an American professional basketball player who was a small forward in the American Basketball Association (ABA). After playing college basketball for the Kansas Jayhawks, Franz played in the ABA for the Oakland Oaks, New Orleans Buccaneers, Floridians, Memphis Tams, and Dallas Chaparrals from 1968 to 1973. He also played in Switzerland.

== Career ==
Franz attended Bishop Ward High School in Kansas City, Kansas. He enrolled at the University of Kansas and played college basketball for the Kansas Jayhawks from 1963 to 1967. He was a three-year starting small forward for the Jayhawks. During the 1966–67 season, he served as team captain under coach Ted Owens.

The Detroit Pistons of the National Basketball Association (NBA) selected Franz in the fourth round of the 1967 NBA draft. The Oakland Oaks of the rival upstart American Basketball Association (ABA) selected Franz in the 10th round of the ABA Draft. Franz chose to sign with Oakland. He played for the Oaks in the 1967–68 season. On June 18, 1968, the Oaks traded Franz, Steve Jones, and Barry Leibowitz to the New Orleans Buccaneers for Larry Brown and Doug Moe.

The Buccaneers traded Franz and Dave Nash to the Miami Floridians for Al Cueto, Wil Jones, and Erv Staggs on June 9, 1970. The Floridians folded in 1972, and the Memphis Tams selected Franz in a dispersal draft. Franz announced his retirement from basketball in December 1972. However, he signed with the Dallas Chaparrals in January 1973. Franz signed with Memphis for the 1974-75 ABA season, but he was cut.

Franz played for the Swiss Alpines of the European Professional Basketball League during its only season in 1975.

== Personal life and death ==
After his playing career, Franz owned a construction company based in Memphis that built houses in Tennessee, Arkansas, and Florida. He and his wife Georgia had 2 daughters together, Tara Lynn Franz and Shawna Lee Franz. He and his wife, Georgia, retired to Fort Walton Beach, Florida.

Franz died in Fort Walton Beach on October 3, 2022, at the age of 76. He leaves behind his wife, 2 daughters, and 2 grandchildren, Nolan Thomas and Grace Linnea.

== Career statistics ==
Legend
GP	Games played	GS	Games started	MPG	Minutes per game
FG%	Field goal percentage	3P%	3-point field goal percentage	FT%	Free throw percentage
RPG	Rebounds per game	APG	Assists per game	SPG	Steals per game
BPG	Blocks per game	PPG	Points per game	**Bold**	Career high

=== ABA ===
==== Regular season ====
Year	Team	GP	MPG	FG%	3P%	FT%	RPG	APG	PPG
1967–68	Oakland	**74**	28.1	.392	.258	.691	6.3	1.7	12.6
1968–69	New Orleans	73	**30.1**	.4348	**.355**	**.737**	**7.1**	**2.6**	**14.5**
1969–70	New Orleans	55	23.7	.422	.280	.629	5.2	1.7	11.5
1970–71	Florida	67	23.8	.485	.318	.726	4.8	1.4	12.1
1971–72	Florida	**74**	24.6	.485	.182	.704	4.6	1.3	11.6
1972–73	Memphis	23	17.5	.465	.000	.697	3.8	1.1	7.2
1972–73	Dallas	37	13.8	**.506**	.333	.733	2.8	1.1	7.5
Career		403	24.6	.447	.279	.703	5.3	1.7	11.7

==== Playoffs ====
Year	Team	GP	MPG	FG%	3P%	FT%	RPG	APG	PPG
1969	New Orleans	**11**	**23.7**	**.339**	**.143**	**.676**	4.3	**1.6**	**9.3**
1971	Florida	2	20.0	.333	.000	.375	5.0	1.0	8.5
1972	Florida	4	22.0	.333	.000	.375	**6.3**	1.0	6.8
Career		17	22.9	.337	.111	.585	4.8	1.4	8.6
