= 1969–70 New Orleans Buccaneers season =

- Head coach: Babe McCarthy
- Arena: Tulane Gym; Municipal Auditorium

Results
- Record: 42–42 (.500)
- Place: Division: 5th

Local media
- Television: WDSU 6

The 1969–70 New Orleans Buccaneers season was the third and final season of the Buccaneers in the ABA. The Buccaneers entered the season with a 22–12 record by the beginning of 1970 in part due to two 6-game winning streaks. However, an eight-game losing streak from February 22 to March 8, 1970 plummeted the team from a 31–24 winning record to a 31–32 losing record, which led to New Orleans remaining around .500 from there on in, to the point where they later won their last two games of the season to finish at exactly .500. Despite their average record being a finish that would normally entail a playoff spot in the ABA, the Buccaneers were eliminated from playoff contention by finishing one game behind the Los Angeles Stars, a team who entered the season with little expectations on their end and later reached the 1970 ABA Finals. This led to this season's New Orleans Buccaneers team being the only ABA team to ever finish their season with at least an average record, yet still miss out on competing in the ABA Playoffs. The Bucs were tenth in points scored this season with 107.9 points per game and second in points allowed at 107.1 points per game. Despite looking successful on the court, the team did not have as much success with their attendance, and plans were made following the season's end to play their home games throughout the state of Louisiana (to the point of even renaming themselves as the Louisiana Buccaneers similar to other regional franchises like the Carolina Cougars, Virginia Squires, Texas Chaparrals, and "The Floridians" franchises that had attempted to rebrand themselves as regional franchises in the previous two seasons with mixed short-term results), such as Shreveport, Lafayette, Monroe and Baton Rouge. However, on August 21, 1970, P. L. Blake bought the team and subsequently moved it to Memphis, Tennessee ten days later to become the Memphis Pros (with the name Pros being chosen due to Blake wanting to refurbish the Buccaneers' four letter jerseys of "Bucs" to the best of his abilities, choosing Pros as his cheapest option to do so), though the team's move to Memphis would later cause them to go from being one of the better franchises in the ABA to one of the worst-ran franchises on an almost overnight basis, to the point where the ABA had to step in and try to save the team on multiple occasions at various points before later giving up on them altogether. New Orleans would not have a new pro basketball team until 1974 with the New Orleans Jazz coming to the rivaling NBA, with their current franchise there being the New Orleans Pelicans in the NBA following the Jazz moving to Utah in 1979 and a franchise called the Charlotte Hornets moved to New Orleans (keeping their original Hornets name) in 2002, later becoming the Pelicans in 2013 and then its own franchise a year after that when the Charlotte Bobcats renamed themselves to the new Charlotte Hornets (though the Pelicans would also keep the history of the New Orleans Hornets name as a part of their own team history, including the couple of years where they went by the temporary moniker of the New Orleans/Oklahoma City Hornets, with them temporarily being stationed at Oklahoma City, Oklahoma due to Hurricane Katrina).

== Roster ==
1969–70 New Orleans Buccaneers roster
Players

Pos.	No.	Player	Height	Weight	DOB	From
PF	14	Tommie Bowens	6 ft 8 in (2.03 m)	220 lb (100 kg)	July 7, 1940	Grambling State
SG	10	Mike Butler	6 ft 2 in (1.88 m)	170 lb (77 kg)	October 22, 1946	Memphis
PF	34	Lee Davis	6 ft 8 in (2.03 m)	235 lb (107 kg)	October 11, 1945	North Carolina Central
SF	11	Ron Franz	6 ft 7 in (2.01 m)	205 lb (93 kg)	October 20, 1945	Kansas
C	25	Gerald Govan	6 ft 10 in (2.08 m)	220 lb (100 kg)	January 2, 1942	Saint Mary of the Plains College
PG	15	Jimmy Jones	6 ft 4 in (1.93 m)	188 lb (85 kg)	January 1, 1945	Grambling State
SG	23	Steve Jones	6 ft 5 in (1.96 m)	205 lb (93 kg)	October 17, 1942	Oregon
PF	32	Jackie Moreland	6 ft 7 in (2.01 m)	215 lb (98 kg)	March 11, 1938	Louisiana Tech
SG	12	Ron Perry	6 ft 3 in (1.91 m)	190 lb (86 kg)	December 29, 1943	Virginia Tech
C	21	Red Robbins	6 ft 8 in (2.03 m)	190 lb (86 kg)	September 30, 1944	Tennessee
F	22	Jerry Rook	6 ft 5 in (1.96 m)	219 lb (99 kg)	October 27, 1943	Arkansas State
SG	24	Skeeter Swift	6 ft 3 in (1.91 m)	204 lb (93 kg)	June 19, 1946	East Tennessee State
SF	31	Jasper Wilson	6 ft 6 in (1.98 m)	200 lb (91 kg)	July 12, 1947	Southern

Coaches
Head coach
- Babe McCarthy

Legend
- (DP) Unsigned draft pick
- (FA) Free agent
- (S) Suspended
- Injured

Roster

== Final standings ==
=== Western Division ===
Western Division	W	L	PCT	GB
Denver Rockets *	51	33	.607	—
Dallas Chaparrals *	45	39	.536	6.0
Washington Caps *	44	40	.524	7.0
Los Angeles Stars *	43	41	.512	8.0
New Orleans Buccaneers	42	42	.500	9.0

== Awards, records, and honors ==
1970 ABA All-Star Game played on January 24, 1970

- Jimmy Jones
- Steve Jones
- Gerald Govan
- Red Robbins (injured, did not play)
