= 1969–70 Miami Floridians season =

- Head coach: Jim Pollard (5–15); Harold Blitman (18–46)
- Arena: Miami Beach Convention Center; Convention Center Annex; Dinner Key Auditorium; Miami-Dade Junior College North

Results
- Record: 23–61 (.274)
- Place: Division: 6th (Eastern)
- Playoff finish: Did not qualify
- Radio: WGBS

The 1969–70 Miami Floridians season was the second season of the Miami Floridians in the American Basketball Association and third season of the franchise when including their first season they played as the Minnesota Muskies. The team notably tried gimmicks to attract fans. The game they played on November 5 would be Ladies Night, with free honey colored pantyhose (originally $2 value) given to the first 500 ladies, provided it fit anyone from 5 feet to 5 feet, 9 inches in size, with nothing extra being needed to buy. For the November 10th game, if one bought a ticket (for $5), they would be allowed to walk to the Auditorium to see Jimmy Ellis (who had just lost the World Heavyweight title to Joe Frazier) box Roberto Davila, with the fight being done after the game. The team faltered itself to a dead last finish, with constant trades and scant profits despite their best efforts to promote the team in the Miami area. The team's 61 losses would be the most losses held in the ABA until the 1973–74 Memphis Tams season occurred. Ned Doyle, an advertising executive, became majority owner of the team, and he decided to make the team a regional franchise named "The Floridians", playing in Miami Beach, Jacksonville, Tampa, St. Petersburg and West Palm Beach.

== Roster ==
1969–70 Miami Floridians roster
Players

Pos.	No.	Player	Height	Weight	DOB	From
SG	23	Andrew Anderson	6 ft 2 in (1.88 m)	184 lb (83 kg)	July 6, 1945	Canisius
C	41	Butch Booker	6 ft 10 in (2.08 m)	230 lb (104 kg)	July 20, 1945	Cheyney
PF	22	Walt Byrd	6 ft 7 in (2.01 m)	205 lb (93 kg)		Temple
SG	30	Larry Cannon	6 ft 4 in (1.93 m)	195 lb (88 kg)	April 12, 1947	La Salle
C	42	Al Cueto	6 ft 7 in (2.01 m)	230 lb (104 kg)	August 2, 1946	Tulsa
SG	20	Donnie Freeman	6 ft 3 in (1.91 m)	185 lb (84 kg)	July 18, 1944	Illinois
SG	32	Art Heyman	6 ft 5 in (1.96 m)	205 lb (93 kg)	June 24, 1941	Duke
SF	34	Simmie Hill	6 ft 7 in (2.01 m)	233 lb (106 kg)	November 14, 1946	West Texas A&M
PF	14	Wil Jones	6 ft 8 in (2.03 m)	205 lb (93 kg)	February 27, 1947	Albany State
PG	26	George Lehmann	6 ft 0 in (1.83 m)	180 lb (82 kg)	May 1, 1941	Campbell
PG	22	Maurice McHartley	6 ft 3 in (1.91 m)	185 lb (84 kg)	August 1, 1942	North Carolina A&T
SF	44	Willie Murrell	6 ft 6 in (1.98 m)	225 lb (102 kg)	September 13, 1941	Kansas State
SF	23	Lynn Shackelford	6 ft 5 in (1.96 m)	190 lb (86 kg)	August 27, 1947	UCLA
PF	33	Don Sidle	6 ft 8 in (2.03 m)	215 lb (98 kg)	June 21, 1946	Oklahoma
PF	32	Dan Sparks	6 ft 8 in (2.03 m)	200 lb (91 kg)	April 17, 1945	Weber State
SF	24	Erv Staggs	6 ft 6 in (1.98 m)	195 lb (88 kg)	September 1, 1948	Cheyney
C	43	George Sutor	6 ft 8 in (2.03 m)	235 lb (107 kg)	September 14, 1943	La Salle
C	43	Skip Thoren	6 ft 10 in (2.08 m)	230 lb (104 kg)	April 5, 1943	Illinois
SF	34	Dallas Thornton	6 ft 4 in (1.93 m)	190 lb (86 kg)	September 1, 1946	Kentucky Wesleyan
PG	22	Steve Vacendak	6 ft 1 in (1.85 m)	185 lb (84 kg)	August 15, 1944	Duke
SG	32	Hubie White	6 ft 4 in (1.93 m)	205 lb (93 kg)	January 26, 1940	Villanova
C		Bob Woollard	6 ft 10 in (2.08 m)	225 lb (102 kg)	July 27, 1940	Wake Forest

Coaches
Head coach
- Jim Pollard / Harold Blitman

Legend
- (DP) Unsigned draft pick
- (FA) Free agent
- (S) Suspended
- Injured

Roster

== Final standings ==
=== Eastern Division ===
Team	W	L	PCT.	GB
Indiana Pacers	59	25	.702	—
Kentucky Colonels	45	39	.536	14.0
Carolina Cougars	42	42	.500	17.0
New York Nets	39	45	.464	20.0
Pittsburgh Pipers	29	55	.345	30.0
Miami Floridians	23	61	.274	36.0

== Awards and honors ==
1970 ABA All-Star Game selections (game played on January 24, 1970)

- Donnie Freeman
