= 1968–69 New Orleans Buccaneers season =

- Head coach: Babe McCarthy
- Arena: Loyola Field House

Results
- Record: 46–32 (.590)
- Place: Division: 2nd
- Playoff finish: Division Finals (lost to Oaks 0–4)

Local media
- Television: WDSU 6

The 1968–69 New Orleans Buccaneers season was the 2nd season of the Buccaneers in the ABA. The Bucs traded Larry Brown and Doug Moe to the Oakland Oaks in exchange for Steve Jones and Ron Franz.

In the Western Division semifinals, the Bucs beat the Dallas Chaparrals in seven games. In the Division Finals, they were swept by the Oakland Oaks. This was their final playoff appearance as they stumbled to .500 next season prior to the move to Memphis on August 31, 1970.

== Roster ==
1968–69 New Orleans Buccaneers roster
Players

Pos.	No.	Player	Height	Weight	DOB	From
SG	10	Mike Butler	6 ft 2 in (1.88 m)	170 lb (77 kg)	October 22, 1946	Memphis
PF	34	Lee Davis	6 ft 8 in (2.03 m)	235 lb (107 kg)	October 11, 1945	North Carolina Central
SF	11	Ron Franz	6 ft 7 in (2.01 m)	205 lb (93 kg)	October 20, 1945	Kansas
C	25	Gerald Govan	6 ft 10 in (2.08 m)	220 lb (100 kg)	January 2, 1942	Saint Mary of the Plains College
PG	15	Jimmy Jones	6 ft 4 in (1.93 m)	188 lb (85 kg)	January 1, 1945	Grambling State
SG	23	Steve Jones	6 ft 5 in (1.96 m)	205 lb (93 kg)	October 17, 1942	Oregon
SF		Dave Lee	6 ft 7 in (2.01 m)	225 lb (102 kg)	March 31, 1942	San Francisco
C	33	Elton McGriff	6 ft 9 in (2.06 m)	225 lb (102 kg)	August 21, 1942	Creighton
PF	32	Jackie Moreland	6 ft 7 in (2.01 m)	215 lb (98 kg)	March 11, 1938	Louisiana Tech
SG	12	Marlbert Pradd	6 ft 3 in (1.91 m)	170 lb (77 kg)	November 17, 1944	Dillard
C	21	Red Robbins	6 ft 8 in (2.03 m)	190 lb (86 kg)	September 30, 1944	Tennessee
G	14	Glynn Saulters	6 ft 2 in (1.88 m)	175 lb (79 kg)	February 10, 1945	Northeast Louisiana
SF	31	Jasper Wilson	6 ft 6 in (1.98 m)	200 lb (91 kg)	July 12, 1947	Southern

Coaches
Head coach
- Babe McCarthy

Legend
- (DP) Unsigned draft pick
- (FA) Free agent
- (S) Suspended
- Injured

Roster

== Final standings ==
=== Western Division ===
Team	W	L	PCT.	GB
Oakland Oaks C	60	18	.769	-
New Orleans Buccaneers	46	32	.590	14
Denver Rockets	44	34	.564	16
Dallas Chaparrals	41	37	.526	19
Los Angeles Stars	33	45	.423	27
Houston Mavericks	23	55	.295	37

== ABA Playoffs ==
ABA Western Division Semifinals

Game	Date	Location	Score	Record	Attendance
1	April 5	New Orleans	129–106	1–0	3,765
2	April 7	New Orleans	122–108	2–0	3,525
3	April 10	Dallas	106–130	2–1	2,887
4	April 12	Dallas	114–107	3–1	5,482
5	April 14	New Orleans	112–123	3–2	4,517
6	April 15	Dallas	118–136	3–3	4,366
7	April 17	New Orleans	101–95	4–3	5,823

Buccaneers win series, 4–3

ABA Western Division Finals

Game	Date	Location	Score	Record	Attendance
1	April 19	Oakland	118–128	0–1	2,848
2	April 21	Oakland	124–135	0–2	1,749
3	April 23	New Orleans	107–113	0–3	4,253
4	April 25	New Orleans	114–128	0–4	3,583

Buccaneers lose series, 4–0

== Awards, records, and honors ==
1968 ABA All-Star Game played on January 28, 1969

- Jimmy Jones
- Red Robbins
