= Babe McCarthy =

American basketball coach (1923–1975)

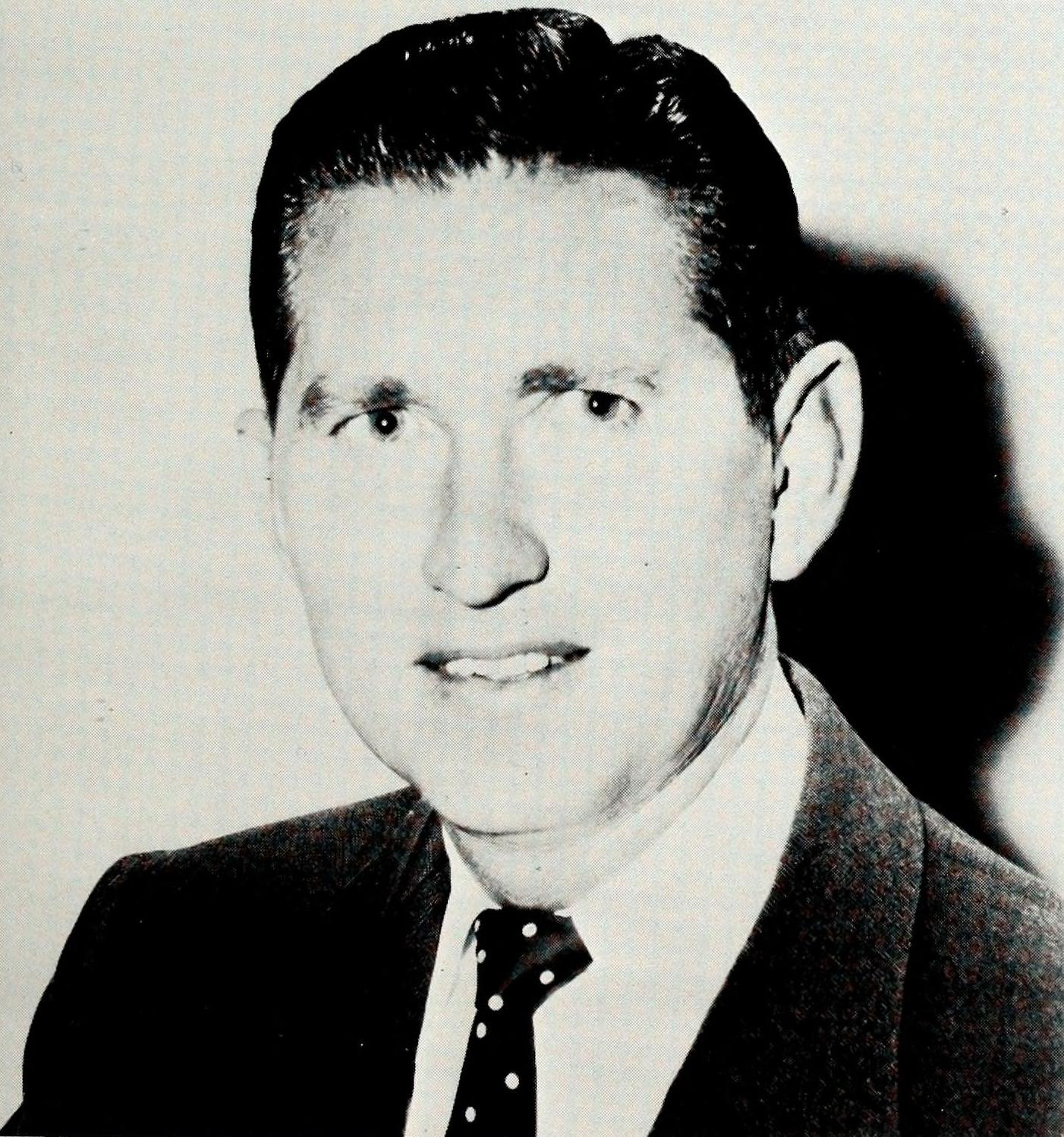
- McCarthy circa 1963

Biographical details
- Born: October 1, 1923; Baldwyn, Mississippi, U.S.
- Died: March 17, 1975 (aged 51); Baldwyn, Mississippi, U.S.
- Education: Mississippi State

Coaching career (HC unless noted)
- 1955–1965: Mississippi State
- 1966–1967: George Washington
- 1967–1970: New Orleans Buccaneers
- 1970–1972: Memphis Pros
- 1972–1973: Dallas Chaparrals
- 1973–1974: Kentucky Colonels

Head coaching record
- Overall: 175–103 (NCAA); 280–284 (ABA)

Accomplishments and honors

Championships
- 4 SEC regular season (1959, 1961–1963)

Awards
- 3× SEC Coach of the Year (1961–1963); ABA Coach of the Year (1974); 3× ABA All-Star Game head coach (1968, 1970, 1974)

James Harrison "Babe" McCarthy (October 1, 1923 – March 17, 1975) was an American professional and collegiate basketball coach. McCarthy was originally from Baldwyn, Mississippi. McCarthy may best be remembered for Mississippi State's appearance in the 1963 NCAA Men's Division I Basketball Tournament when his all-white team sneaked out of town in order to face Loyola University Chicago, which had four black starters.

In March 1975, McCarthy died as a result of colon cancer.

== Early life ==
McCarthy was from Baldwyn, Mississippi, and played high school basketball at Tupelo Junior High School. After high school he attended Mississippi State University where he was a member of Sigma Pi fraternity. He did not play college basketball. He served in the Air Force and then began coaching high school basketball at his alma mater in 1947. He coached them to a state championship in 1948. He was recalled to the Air Force for the Korean War and coached an Air Force team in Memphis, Tennessee, to third place in an Air Force tournament. After the Air Force he officiated SEC games before becoming the Mississippi State coach in 1955.

== College career ==
McCarthy first came to fame for his 10-year stint at Mississippi State, where his teams won 169 games, lost 85, and won four Southeastern Conference (SEC) titles (three outright, one shared). While coaching at MSU he was named SEC Coach of the year three times. When he left Mississippi State he was the school's all-time leader in wins but has since been passed by Richard Williams and Rick Stansbury.

McCarthy may best be remembered for his team crossing the color line in the segregated South of the 1960s. Even before it was certain that Mississippi State would face Loyola and their four black starters, racist elements in the Mississippi media got into the act. On Thursday, March 7, 1963, the Jackson Daily News printed a picture of Loyola's starters to show that four of them were African Americans. As a caption to the picture, Daily News editor Jimmy Ward wrote that "readers may desire to clip the photo of the Loyola team and mail it today to the board of trustees of the institution of higher learning" to prevent the game from taking place. At the time, a longstanding state policy barred college teams at state schools from playing games against racially integrated teams. The Bulldogs had been forced to turn down three previous NCAA Tournament bids for this reason, including when they won their first two outright SEC titles in school history.

The editorials were in response to the decision by Mississippi State President Dean W. Colvard's March 2, 1963, to accept the automatic bid to the NCAA Tournament as outright SEC champions. The College Board of Mississippi met on March 9, 1963, and upheld Colvard's decision. But on March 13, just a day before the team was scheduled to travel to East Lansing, state senator Billy Mitts and former state senator B. W. Lawson sought and obtained a temporary injunction against the team leaving the state.

While sheriffs were on their way to Starkville, Mississippi, to serve the injunction, the team was participating in a pep rally the night before their departure, where effigies of state senators Mitts and Lawson were hung. The team's original plan was to leave Starkville at 8:30 a.m. on Thursday morning. But learning that sheriffs would be expected to arrive in town at 11:30 p.m. Wednesday night, MSU put their sophisticated contingency plan into effect.

McCarthy, the athletic director, and the assistant athletic director drove to Memphis, and then flew to Nashville. The team itself sent the freshman squad to the airport as scheduled-posing as the varsity team. The real varsity team hid in a dorm on campus. The next morning, they boarded a private plane at the airport and flew to Nashville to meet the coach and team officials. From Nashville, the whole group took a commercial flight to the game at East Lansing, Michigan. These events were chronicled in the DVD One Night in March produced by Starkville-based Broadcast Media Group

McCarthy Gymnasium on the campus of MSU was named for him in 1975 and he was also inducted into the Athletics Hall of Fame that year.

McCarthy later coached the George Washington University's men's basketball team, going 6–18 with the Colonials in 1966–1967.

== Head coaching record ==
=== College ===
Record table
Season	Team	Overall	Conference	Standing	Postseason
Mississippi State (Southeastern Conference) (1955–1965)
1955–56	Mississippi State	12–12	6–8	T-6th	
1956–57	Mississippi State	17–8	9–5	T-3rd	
1957–58	Mississippi State	20–5	9–5	T-3rd	
1958–59	Mississippi State	24–1	13–1	1st	Not allowed to accept NCAA Tournament Invitation due to competition with black athletes
1959–60	Mississippi State	12–13	5–9	9th	
1960–61	Mississippi State	19–6	11–3	1st	Not allowed to accept NCAA Tournament Invitation due to competition with black athletes
1961–62	Mississippi State	24–1	13–1	T-1st	Not allowed to accept NCAA Tournament Invitation due to competition with black athletes
1962–63	Mississippi State	22–6	12–2	1st	NCAA Sweet 16
1963–64	Mississippi State	9–17	4–10	11th	
1964–65	Mississippi State	10–16	6–10	8th	
Mississippi State:		169–85	88–54		
George Washington University (Independent) (1966–1967)
1966–67	George Washington	6–18			
George Washington:		6–18			
Total:		175–103			
National champion Postseason invitational champion Conference regular season champion Conference regular season and conference tournament champion Division regular season champion Division regular season and conference tournament champion Conference tournament champion

== ABA career ==
In the American Basketball Association, McCarthy coached the New Orleans Buccaneers from 1967 to 1970, the Memphis Pros from 1970 to 1972, the Dallas Chaparrals for the 1972–73 season, and the Kentucky Colonels in the 1973–1974 season. He was named ABA coach of the year for the 73–74 season. In the 1967–68 season he led the team to victories over the Denver Rockets and Dallas Chaparrals before losing the finals in seven games to the Pittsburgh Pipers. He was named ABA coach of the year in 1969 and 1974. He was the first ABA coach to win 200 games.

In 1997, he received two votes among selectors voting for the ABA All-Time Team in the coaching category.

== Head coaching record ==
Legend
Regular season	G	Games coached	W	Games won	L	Games lost	W–L %	Win–loss %
Playoffs	PG	Playoff games	PW	Playoff wins	PL	Playoff losses	PW–L %	Playoff win–loss %

Team	Year	G	W	L	W–L%	Finish	PG	PW	PL	PW–L%	Result
New Orleans	1967–68	78	48	30	.615	1st in Western	17	10	7	.588	Lost in ABA Finals
New Orleans	1968–69	78	46	32	.590	2nd in Western	11	4	7	.364	Lost in Second Round
New Orleans	1969–70	84	42	42	.500	5th in Western					Missed playoffs
Memphis	1970–71	84	41	43	.488	3rd in Western	4	0	4	.000	Lost in First Round
Memphis	1971–72	84	26	58	.310	5th in Western	—	—	—	—	Missed playoffs
Dallas	1972–73	74	24	48	.333	5th in Western	—	—	—	—	Missed playoffs
Kentucky	1973–74	84	53	31	.631	2nd in Eastern	8	4	4	.500	Lost in Second Round
Career		564	280	284	.496		40	18	22	.474	

== Babe-isms ==
McCarthy was known as "Ol' Magnolia Mouth" (or just "Magnolia Mouth") for his cement-thick Mississippi accent and short, funny phrases called Babe-isms. A few of the more famous and often used Babe-isms were:

- Boy, I gotta tell you, you gotta come out at 'em like a bitin' sow.
- My old pappy used to tell me the sun don't shine on the same dog's butt every day.
- Why panic at five in the mornin' because it's still dark out?
- Now, let's cloud up and rain all over 'em.

== Personal life ==
He died on March 18, 1975, of cancer in Baldwyn, Mississippi just a few hours after he was formally inducted into the Mississippi Sports Hall of Fame. McCarthy was buried at the town cemetery. In 2015, a Mississippi Department of Archives and History marker was dedicated to McCarthy in the town, with several of McCarthy's players present at the ceremony.

Preceded by Joe Mullaney	Kentucky Colonels head basketball coaches 1973–1974	Succeeded by Hubie Brown
