= Dave Lee (basketball) =

American basketball player (born 1942)

Personal information
- Born: March 31, 1942 (age 84) Modesto, California, U.S.
- Listed height: 6 ft 7 in (2.01 m)
- Listed weight: 225 lb (102 kg)

Career information
- High school: Modesto (Modesto, California)
- College: San Francisco (1961–1964)
- NBA draft: 1964: 7th round, 59th overall pick
- Drafted by: San Francisco Warriors
- Position: Small forward
- Number: 32

Career history
- 1967–1968: Oakland Oaks
- 1968–1969: New Orleans Buccaneers
- Stats at Basketball Reference

David Guy Lee (born March 31, 1942) is an American retired professional basketball player. He was a small forward who played two seasons in the American Basketball Association (ABA) as a member of the Oakland Oaks (1967–68) and the New Orleans Buccaneers (1968–69). Born in Modesto, California, Lee attended the University of San Francisco where he was drafted during the seventh round (59^{th} pick overall) of the 1964 NBA draft by the San Francisco Warriors, but he never played for them.

== Career statistics ==
Legend
GP	Games played	GS	Games started	MPG	Minutes per game
FG%	Field goal percentage	3P%	3-point field goal percentage	FT%	Free throw percentage
RPG	Rebounds per game	APG	Assists per game	SPG	Steals per game
BPG	Blocks per game	PPG	Points per game	**Bold**	Career high

=== ABA ===
==== Regular season ====
Year	Team	GP	MPG	FG%	3P%	FT%	RPG	APG	PPG
1967–68	Oakland	**54**	**13.9**	**.453**	**.333**	**.857**	**3.4**	**.4**	**6.9**
1968–69	New Orleans	4	4.0	.111	–	–	.8	.0	.5
Career		58	13.3	.442	.333	.857	3.2	.3	6.4
