= David Nash =

David Nash may refer to:

- David Nash (artist) (born 1945), British sculptor
- David Nash (cricketer) (born 1978), English cricketer
- David Nash (linguist) (born 1951), Australian linguist
- David Nash (physician), Professor of Health Policy at the Jefferson College of Population Health
- David P. Nash (1948–1968), United States Army soldier and Medal of Honor recipient
- David Nash (rugby union) (1939–2016), head coach to Wales national rugby union team
- David Nash (basketball), American basketball player
