= Harold Blitman =

American basketball coach

Harold Blitman (February 12, 1930 – March 23, 2012) was a basketball coach. Blitman was head coach of the American Basketball Association team the Miami Floridians during the 1969–1970 season and of The Floridians during the 1970–1971 season.

Blitman was head coach at Cheyney State from 1962 to 1969.

The Miami Floridians began the 1969–1970 season winning only 5 of their first 20 games under head coach Jim Pollard. On November 29, 1969, Pollard was fired and replaced by Blitman. The team finished with a record of 23 wins and 61 losses. Management problems beyond Blitman's control were a factor; on April 13, 1970, the ABA took over management of the team. The team's average home attendance for the season was 2,724. Ned Doyle took over as majority owner of the team after the season.

In the 1970–1971 season, playing as The Floridians with home games in different parts of the state, the team finished with a record of 37 wins and 47 losses, good for fourth place in the Eastern Division. Average attendance rose to 4,020. However, Blitman was fired as coach on January 15, 1971, and was replaced by Bob Bass.

By the late 1970s, Blitman served as principal of Nautilus Junior High in Miami.

== Head coaching record ==
Legend
Regular season	G	Games coached	W	Games won	L	Games lost	W–L %	Win–loss %
Playoffs	PG	Playoff games	PW	Playoff wins	PL	Playoff losses	PW–L %	Playoff win–loss %

Team	Year	G	W	L	W–L%	Finish	PG	PW	PL	PW–L%	Result
Miami	1969–70	64	18	46	.281	6th in Eastern	—	—	—	—	Missed playoffs
Florida	1968–69	48	18	30	.375	(fired)	—	—	—	—	—
Career		112	36	76	.321		—	—	—	—	

Preceded by Jim Pollard	The Floridians Head Coach; 1969–1971	Succeeded by Bob Bass
