= Rich Johnson (basketball) =

American basketball player

Personal information
- Born: December 18, 1946 Alexandria, Louisiana, U.S.
- Died: June 15, 1994 (aged 47) Vicksburg, Mississippi, U.S.
- Listed height: 6 ft 7 in (2.01 m)
- Listed weight: 210 lb (95 kg)

Career information
- College: Grambling State (1964–1968)
- NBA draft: 1968: 4th round, 46th overall pick
- Drafted by: Boston Celtics
- Playing career: 1968–1973
- Position: Center
- Number: 26, 12, 15

Career history
- 1968–1970: Boston Celtics
- 1970: The Floridians
- 1970–1971: Carolina Cougars
- 1971: Pittsburgh Condors
- 1972–1973: Wilkes-Barre Barons

Career highlights
- NBA champion (1969)

Career NBA and ABA statistics
- Points: 677 (5.0 ppg)
- Rebounds: 417 (3.1 rpg)
- Assists: 58 (0.4 apg)
- Stats at NBA.com
- Stats at Basketball Reference

Richard Lewis Johnson (December 18, 1946 – June 15, 1994) was an American professional basketball player.

A 6'9" center from Grambling State University, Johnson played parts of three seasons (1968–1971) with the Boston Celtics of the National Basketball Association. He averaged 4.7 points per game in his NBA career and won an NBA Championship ring in 1969.

Johnson later played for several American Basketball Association teams.

== Career statistics ==
Legend
GP	Games played	GS	Games started	MPG	Minutes per game
FG%	Field goal percentage	3P%	3-point field goal percentage	FT%	Free throw percentage
RPG	Rebounds per game	APG	Assists per game	SPG	Steals per game
BPG	Blocks per game	PPG	Points per game	**Bold**	Career high
†	Won an NBA championship

=== NBA/ABA ===
==== Regular season ====
Year	Team	GP	MPG	FG%	3P%	FT%	RPG	APG	PPG
1968–69†	Boston	31	5.3	.382		.478	1.7	.2	2.2
1969–70	Boston	**65**	13.8	.463		.657	3.2	.5	5.8
1970–71	Boston	1	13.0	**.800**		–	**5.0**	.0	**8.0**
1970–71	Florida (ABA)	7	**16.7**	.571	–	.571	4.4	**.7**	5.1
1970–71	Carolina (ABA)	25	15.8	.464	–	**.707**	4.4	.4	6.8
1970–71	Pittsburgh (ABA)	6	5.0	.500	–	.500	1.8	.5	2.5
Career (NBA)		97	11.1	.452		.613	2.7	.4	4.7
Career (ABA)		38	14.3	.482	–	.667	4.0	.5	5.8
Career (overall)		135	12.0	.461	–	.633	3.1	.4	5.0

==== Playoffs ====
Year	Team	GP	MPG	FG%	FT%	RPG	APG	PPG
1969†	Boston	2	2.0	1.000	–	1.0	.0	1.0
