= 1970–71 The Floridians season =

- Head coach: Harold Blitman (18–30); Bob Bass (19–17)
- Owner: James Edwin Doyle
- Arena: Miami Beach Convention Center; Curtis Hixon Hall; Bayfront Arena; Jacksonville Coliseum; West Palm Beach Auditorium

Results
- Record: 37–47 (.440)
- Place: Division: 4th (Eastern)
- Playoff finish: Lost in Division Semifinals

The 1970–71 The Floridians season was the third season of American Basketball Association in Florida and first as The Floridians, after two seasons as the Miami Floridians, as well as their fourth season as a franchise when including their only season played as the Minnesota Muskies. In an attempt to appeal to the entire regional, game were played in five cities: Miami, Tampa, St. Petersburg, Florida, Jacksonville, and West Palm Beach. New head owner Ned Doyle decided to get rid of the entire team, except the coach. The Floridians finished 9th in points scored at 114.0 per game, but 5th in points allowed at 115.6 per game. The team's biggest losing streak was 6, which happened less than a month after the season began, though a 5-game winning streak followed that. But by the first half of the season, they were 17–25, and Blitman was fired after they had lost their fifth straight game on January 14 to make them 18–30. One day later, Bob Bass was hired by the team after resigning from Texas Tech. The next day, he won his first game, versus the Utah Stars. A seven-game winning streak near the end of the season helped clinch a playoff spot for the team, with the key win being versus the Pittsburgh Condors on March 28, the penultimate game of the season played in Jacksonville, beating them 130–117 to eliminate Pittsburgh. In the Semifinals, they overcame a 2–0 hole to tie the series up, but the Kentucky Colonels won the next two games to win the series.

== Roster ==
1970–71 The Floridians roster
Players

| Pos. | No. | Player | Height | Weight | DOB | From |
|---|---|---|---|---|---|---|
| SG | 24 | Charlie Beasley | 6 ft 5 in (1.96 m) | 190 lb (86 kg) | September 23, 1945 | SMU |
| F | 12 | Clarence Brookins | 6 ft 4 in (1.93 m) | 190 lb (86 kg) | 1946 | Temple |
| PG | 21 | Mack Calvin | 6 ft 0 in (1.83 m) | 165 lb (75 kg) | July 27, 1947 | USC |
| PF | 21, 44 | Warren Davis | 6 ft 6 in (1.98 m) | 212 lb (96 kg) | June 30, 1943 | North Carolina A&T |
| SF | 15 | Ron Franz | 6 ft 7 in (2.01 m) | 205 lb (93 kg) | October 20, 1945 | Kansas |
| C | 51 | Carl Fuller | 6 ft 9 in (2.06 m) | 225 lb (102 kg) | January 10, 1946 | Bethune–Cookman |
| C | 41 | Ira Harge | 6 ft 9 in (2.06 m) | 225 lb (102 kg) | March 14, 1941 | New Mexico |
| C | 12 | Rich Johnson | 6 ft 7 in (2.01 m) | 210 lb (95 kg) | December 18, 1946 | Grambling State |
| SG | 32 | Larry Jones | 6 ft 2 in (1.88 m) | 180 lb (82 kg) | September 22, 1942 | Toledo |
| SG | 11 | Ron Nelson | 6 ft 2 in (1.88 m) | 175 lb (79 kg) | October 7, 1946 | New Mexico |
| C | 52 | Rich Niemann | 7 ft 0 in (2.13 m) | 245 lb (111 kg) | July 2, 1946 | Saint Louis |
| G | 10 | Fran O'Hanlon | 6 ft 1 in (1.85 m) | 175 lb (79 kg) | August 24, 1948 | Villanova |
| SF | 31 | Sam Robinson | 6 ft 7 in (2.01 m) | 190 lb (86 kg) | January 1, 1948 | Long Beach State |
| F | 22 | Dennis Stewart | 6 ft 6 in (1.98 m) | 220 lb (100 kg) | April 11, 1947 | Michigan |
| PF | 12 | Al Tucker | 6 ft 8 in (2.03 m) | 190 lb (86 kg) | February 24, 1943 | Oklahoma Baptist |
| PF | 14 | Trooper Washington | 6 ft 7 in (2.01 m) | 215 lb (98 kg) | April 21, 1944 | Cheyney |
| PF | 22 | Greg Wittman | 6 ft 8 in (2.03 m) | 210 lb (95 kg) | May 10, 1947 | Western Carolina |
| SG | 20 | Lonnie Wright | 6 ft 2 in (1.88 m) | 205 lb (93 kg) | January 23, 1945 | Colorado State |

Coaches
Head coach
- Harold Blitman / Bob Bass

Legend
- (DP) Unsigned draft pick
- (FA) Free agent
- (S) Suspended
- Injured

Roster

== Final standings ==
=== Eastern Division ===
| Team | W | L | PCT. | GB |
|---|---|---|---|---|
| Virginia Squires | 55 | 29 | .655 | - |
| Kentucky Colonels | 44 | 40 | .524 | 11.0 |
| New York Nets | 40 | 44 | .476 | 15.0 |
| The Floridians | 37 | 47 | .440 | 18.0 |
| Pittsburgh Condors | 36 | 48 | .429 | 19.0 |
| Carolina Cougars | 34 | 50 | .405 | 21.0 |

== ABA Playoffs ==
ABA Eastern Division Semifinals

| Game | Date | Location | Score | Record | Attendance |
| 1 | April 2 | Kentucky | 112–116 | 0–1 | 3,182 |
| 2 | April 4 | Kentucky | 110–120 | 0–2 | 3,881 |
| 3 | April 6 | Miami-Dade (Florida) | 120–102 | 1–2 | 4,126 |
| 4 | April 8 | Miami-Dade (Florida) | 129–117 | 2–2 | 4,268 |
| 5 | April 10 | Kentucky | 101–118 | 2–3 | 4,996 |
| 6 | April 12 | Miami-Dade (Florida) | 103–112 | 2–4 | 4,478 |

The Floridians lose series, 4–2

== Awards and honors ==
1971 ABA All-Star Game selections (game played on January 23, 1971)

- Mack Calvin
- Larry Jones
