= Bob Woollard =

American basketball player

Personal information
- Born: July 27, 1940
- Died: March 28, 2024 (aged 83) Hamptonville, North Carolina, U.S.
- Listed height: 6 ft 10 in (2.08 m)
- Listed weight: 225 lb (102 kg)

Career information
- High school: Bloomfield (Bloomfield, New Jersey)
- College: Wake Forest (1960–1963)
- NBA draft: 1963: 7th round, 54th overall pick
- Drafted by: New York Knicks
- Position: Center

Career history

Playing
- 1966–1967: Twin City Sailors
- 1967–1968: Grand Rapids Tackers
- 1970: Miami Floridians

Coaching
- 197?–1975: Edneyville HS
- Stats at Basketball Reference

Robert George Woollard (July 27, 1940 – March 28, 2024) was an American professional basketball player. He played for the Miami Floridians during the second half of the 1969–70 ABA season after a collegiate career for the Wake Forest Demon Deacons.

Woollard became a schoolteacher and high school basketball coach in his post-playing years.

Woollard died on March 28, 2024, in Hamptonville, North Carolina.
