= 1967 NAIA basketball tournament =

College basketball tournament

1967 NAIA men's basketball tournament
- Season: 1966–67
- Teams: 32
- Finals site: Municipal Auditorium; Kansas City, Missouri
- Champions: St. Benedict's (Kan.) (2nd title, 2nd title game, 2nd Final Four)
- Runner-up: Oklahoma Baptist (3rd title game, 3rd Final Four)
- Semifinalists: Central Washington (1st Final Four); Morris Harvey (W. Va.) (1st Final Four)
- Coach of the year: Bob Bass (Oklahoma Baptist)
- Charles Stevenson Hustle Award: David Benedict (Central Washington)
- MVP: Al Tucker (2nd title) (Oklahoma Baptist)
- Top scorer: Al Tucker (Oklahoma Baptist) (164 points)

The 1967 NAIA men's basketball tournament was held in March at Municipal Auditorium in Kansas City, Missouri. The 30th annual NAIA basketball tournament featured 32 teams playing in a single-elimination format. There were only 3 upsets in this tournament. The championship game featured St. Benedict's College (Kan.) and Oklahoma Baptist University. The Ravens would defeat the Biso 71–65. The 3rd place game featured Central Washington University defeating Morris Harvey College (W. Va.) by a score of 106 to 92. 1967 was the final year of 21 straight tournaments to have a player make it on the all-time leading scorers list. The streak that began with Harold Haskins in 1947 ended with Al Tucker in 1967. This streak had peaked in 1957 when 7 all-timers played in one tournament. It is argued that this marked the end of the "golden age" of NAIA basketball. It was the third tournament won by the number one seed.

== Awards and honors ==
- Leading scorer: Al Tucker, Oklahoma Baptist; 5 games, 164 total points including 65 field goals 34 free throws, averaging 32.8 points per game.
- Leading rebounder: Darryl Jones, St. Benedict's (Kan.); in 5 games Jones would earn 62 rebounds averaging 12.4 per game.
- Player of the Year: est. 1994
- All-time single game performances: 6th; Al Tucker, Oklahoma Baptist; Oklahoma Baptist vs. St. Benedict's (Kan.); Tucker scored 47 points, including 21 field goals and 5 free throws.
- All-time leading scorer; final appearance: Al Tucker, 2nd, Oklahoma Baptist (1965,66,67); 15 games, 177 field goals, 117 free throws, 471 total points (31.4 points per game).

== 1967 NAIA bracket ==
First round | Second round
1 | St. Benedict's (Kan.) | 80
- | Linfield (Ore.) | 75
1 | St. Benedict's | 67
16 | Southern State | 56
- | Eastern Montana | 62
16 | Southern State (Ark.) | 75
TOP TIER
9 | Westminster (Pa.) | 84
- | Oshkosh State (Wis.) | 62
9 | Westminster (Pa.) | 53
8 | St. Mary's | 55
- | Wartburg (Iowa) | 56
8 | St. Mary's (Texas) | 59
5 | Tennessee Wesleyan | 94
- | Indiana Central | 89*
5 | Tennessee Wesleyan | 65
12 | Midwestern | 59
- | Dickinson State (N.D.) | 77
12 | Midwestern (Texas) | 96
TOP TIER
13 | Millersville State (Pa.) | 66
- | Chadron State (Neb.) | 83
- | Chadron State | 76
4 | Morris Harvey | 91
- | Howard Payne (Texas) | 85
4 | Morris Harvey (W.Va.) | 103
3 | Oklahoma Baptist | 55
- | Alcorn A&M (Miss.) | 52
3 | Oklahoma Baptist | 70
14 | Valdosta State | 62
- | Quincy (Ill.) | 64
14 | Valdosta State (Ga.) | 78
BOTTOM TIER
7 | Southwestern Louisiana | 110
- | Findlay (Ohio) | 73
7 | Southwestern Louisiana | 70
10 | Central Michigan | 62
- | Albany State (Ga.) | 70
10 | Central Michigan | 71
11 | Guilford (N.C.) | 70
- | Boston State (Mass.) | 61
11 | Guilford | 67
6 | Central Washington State | 78
- | Trenton State (N.J.) | 60
6 | Central Washington State | 72
BOTTOM TIER
15 | St. Thomas (Minn.) | 72
- | Claremont-Mudd (Calif.) | 63
15 | St. Thomas | 67
2 | Eastern New Mexico | 69
- | Rockhurst (Mo.) | 59
2 | Eastern New Mexico | 64

Elite Eight
1 | St. Benedict's | 88
8 | St. Mary's | 73
5 | Tennessee Wesleyan | 68
4 | Morris Harvey | 75
3 | Oklahoma Baptist | 66
7 | Southwestern Louisiana | 65
6 | Central Washington State | 60
2 | Eastern New Mexico | 58

NAIA national semifinals
1 | St. Benedict's | 73
4 | Morris Harvey | 70
3 | Oklahoma Baptist | 78
6 | Central Washington State | 68

NAIA national championship
1 | St. Benedict's | 71
3 | Oklahoma Baptist | 65

- * denotes overtime.

=== Third-place game ===
The third-place game featured the losing teams from the national semifinalist to determine 3rd and 4th places in the tournament. This game was played until 1988.

| NAIA third-place game |
| 4 | Morris Harvey | 92 |
| 6 | Central Washington State | 106 |

== See also ==
- 1967 NCAA University Division basketball tournament
- 1967 NCAA College Division basketball tournament
