= Erv Staggs =

American basketball player (1948–2012)

Personal information
- Born: September 1, 1948 Philadelphia, Pennsylvania, U.S.
- Died: December 29, 2012 (aged 64) Philadelphia, Pennsylvania, U.S.
- Listed height: 6 ft 6 in (1.98 m)
- Listed weight: 195 lb (88 kg)

Career information
- High school: Thomas Edison (Philadelphia, Pennsylvania)
- College: North Carolina A&T (196?–1968); Cheyney (1968–1969)
- NBA draft: 1969: undrafted
- Position: Small forward
- Number: 24

Career history
- 1969–1970: Miami Floridians
- Stats at Basketball Reference

James Ervin Staggs (September 1, 1948 – December 29, 2012) was an American professional basketball player. He played in the American Basketball Association for the Miami Floridians during the 1969–70 season and averaged 8.5 points, 2.3 rebounds, and 1.4 assists per game. Staggs played college basketball at both North Carolina A&T and Cheyney.
