= Central Michigan Chippewas men's basketball =

Men's basketball team of Central Michigan University

2026–27 Central Michigan Chippewas men's basketball team
- University: Central Michigan University
- Head coach: Andy Bronkema (2nd season)
- Location: Mount Pleasant, Michigan
- Arena: McGuirk Arena (capacity: 5,300)
- Conference: Mid-American
- Nickname: Chippewas
- Colors: Maroon and gold

NCAA Division I tournament Sweet Sixteen
- 1965*, 1970*, 1971*, 1975

NCAA Division I tournament appearances
- 1965*, 1970*, 1971*, 1975, 1977, 1987, 2003

Conference tournament champions
- 1987, 2003

Conference regular-season champions
- 1975, 1977, 1979, 1987, 2001, 2003, 2015

Conference division champions
- 2001, 2003, 2009, 2010, 2015, 2016

Uniforms
Home	Away
- * at Division II level

The Central Michigan Chippewas team is the basketball team that represent Central Michigan University in Mount Pleasant, Michigan. The school's team currently competes in the Mid-American Conference. The team last played in the NCAA Division I men's basketball tournament in 2003. The Chippewas are currently coached by Andy Bronkema.

== Postseason ==
=== NCAA Division I ===
The Chippewas have appeared in four NCAA tournaments. Their combined record is 3–4.

Year	Seed	Round	Opponent	Result
1975		First Round; Sweet Sixteen; Regional Third Place	Georgetown; Kentucky; Oregon State	W 77–75; L 73–90; W 88–87
1977		First Round	Charlotte	L 86–91
1987	#13	First Round	UCLA	L 73–92
2003	#11	First Round; Second Round	Creighton; Duke	W 79–73; L 60–86

=== NCAA Division II ===
Central Michigan appeared in the NCAA Division II men's basketball tournament three times. Their combined record was 3–3.

Year	Round	Opponent	Result
1965	Regional Semifinals; Regional Finals	Jackson State; Southern Illinois	W 83–79; L 62–90
1970	Regional Semifinals; Regional Finals	Wayne State (MI); St. Joseph's (IN)	W 73–61; L 68–87
1971	Regional Semifinals; Regional Finals	Augustana (IL); Evansville	W 63–59; L 60–78

=== NIT ===
The Chippewas have appeared in the National Invitation Tournament (NIT) twice. Their combined record is 0–2.

Year	Seed	Round	Opponent	Result
1979		First Round	Purdue	L 80–97
2015	#6	First Round	Louisiana Tech	L 79–89

=== College Basketball Invitational (CBI) results ===
The Chippewas have appeared in the Division I College Basketball Invitational (CBI) once. Their record is 0–1.

Year	Round	Opponent	Result
2019	First Round	DePaul	L 86–100

=== CIT ===
The Chippewas have appeared in the CollegeInsider.com Postseason Tournament (CIT) two times. Their combined record is 2–2.

Year	Round	Opponent	Result
2016	First Round	UT Martin	L 73–76
2018	First Round; Second Round; Quarterfinals	Fort Wayne; Wofford; Liberty	W 94–89; W 98–94; L 71–84

=== NAIA Tournament results ===
Central Michigan went to the NAIA Tournament twice, garnering a record of 2–2. Former coach Ted Kjolhede was named NAIA Coach of the Year for 1966.

Year	Round	Opponent	Result
1966	First Round; Second Round	Edinboro; Oklahoma Baptist	W 67–53; L 70–90
1967	First Round; Second Round	Albany State; Southwestern Louisiana	W 71–70; L 62–70

== Player achievements and accolades ==
=== Retired numbers ===
The Chippewas have retired six numbers, in honor of seven different players.

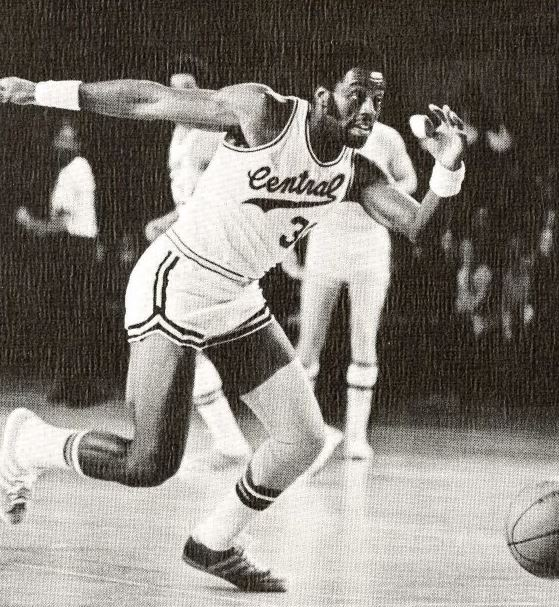
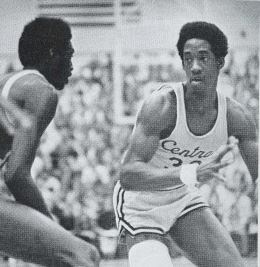
Ben Kelso (left) and Dan Roundfield, whose numbers were retired by Central Michigan. Rounfield was also the program's first MAC Player of the Year winner

Central Michigan Chippewas retired numbers
No.	Player	Years played	Ref.
14	Jim McElroy	1973–1975	
14	Mel McLaughlin	1980–1983	
30	Ben Kelso	1970–1973	
32	Dan Roundfield	1972–1975	
44	Dan Majerle	1984–1988	
50	Ben Poquette	1973–1977	
54	Don Edwards	1963–1966	

=== Chippewas in the ABA/NBA ===
- Nate Huffman (NBA 2002–2003)
- Willie Iverson (ABA 1968–1969)
- Chris Kaman (NBA 2003–2016)
- Ben Kelso (NBA 1973–1974)
- Dan Majerle (NBA 1988–2002)
- Dan Roundfield (NBA 1975–1987)
- Jim McElroy (NBA 1975–1982)
- Ben Poquette (NBA 1977–1987)
