= Eastern Division (ABA) =

The Eastern Division of the ABA, or ABA Eastern Division, was one of the two groups in which the teams of the American Basketball Association were divided, based on their geographical location. The other group was called the Western Division (ABA), or ABA Western Division.

The first four teams in each division entered the ABA Playoffs. The divisions were maintained until the 1974–75 season, since in the last season the 9 surviving teams were regrouped in a single division.

== Participating teams ==
The last teams that participated in the Eastern Division were the following:

- Kentucky Colonels
- New York Nets
- Spirits of St. Louis
- Memphis Sounds
- Virginia Squires

=== Other teams ===
Disappeared

- Pittsburgh Pipers/Minnesota Pipers/Pittsburgh Condors
- Minnesota Muskies/Miami Floridians/The Floridians

Transferred to Western Division

- Indiana Pacers

== Eastern Conference champions ==
In bold the ABA champions

- 1968: **Pittsburgh Pipers**
- 1969: Indiana Pacers
- 1970: **Indiana Pacers**
- 1971: Kentucky Colonels
- 1972: New York Nets
- 1973: Kentucky Colonels
- 1974: **New York Nets**
- 1975: **Kentucky Colonels**

== Titles ==
- 3: Kentucky Colonels
- 2: Indiana Pacers
- 2: New York Nets
- 1: Pittsburgh Pipers
