= Walt Byrd =

American basketball player

Personal information
- Born: 1942 (age 83–84)
- Listed height: 6 ft 7 in (2.01 m)
- Listed weight: 205 lb (93 kg)

Career information
- High school: Central (Philadelphia, Pennsylvania)
- College: Temple (1956–1957)
- Playing career: 1960–1972
- Position: Power forward
- Number: 22

Career history
- 1960–1964: Sunbury Mercuries
- 1964–1965: Camden Bullets
- 1965–1967: New Haven Elms
- 1966–1968: Trenton Colonials
- 1967–1968: Wilkes-Barre Barons
- 1969–1970: Miami Floridians
- 1970–1971: Camden Bullets
- 1971–1972: Cherry Hill Demons / Hazleton Bits
- Stats at Basketball Reference

Walter Byrd (born 1942) is an American former basketball player. He played collegiately for Temple University. Professionally, Byrd played for the Miami Floridians in the American Basketball Association (ABA) for 22 games, as well as for a number of teams in the Eastern Professional Basketball League.
