= Southern Arkansas Muleriders men's basketball =

Southern Arkansas Muleriders
- University: Southern Arkansas University
- Head coach: Andy Sharpe (8th season)
- Location: Magnolia, Arkansas
- Arena: W.T. Watson Athletic Center (capacity: 2,500)
- Conference: Great American Conference
- Nickname: Muleriders
- Colors: Royal blue and gold

NCAA Division I tournament appearances
- NAIA: 1957, 1966, 1967, 1971, 1989

Conference tournament champions
- Southeastern Junior College Championship: 1948; NAIA District 17: 1957, 1966, 1967, 1971, 1983, 1990

Conference regular-season champions
- AIC: 1934, 1935, 1966, 1967, 1971, 1989; GAC: 2021 (Eastern Division)

Uniforms
Home	Away	Alternate

The Southern Arkansas men's basketball program is the college basketball program that represents Southern Arkansas University, competing in the Great American Conference. The program began as early as 1911. Though it has been sporadic, the Muleriders have had successes on the hardwood.

== Coaches ==
There have been 9 Mulerider Basketball coaches since 1947. The school's all-time winningest coach was W.T. Watson. Watson also lead the Muleriders' to three conference regular season championships. Watson's contributions to SAU as basketball coach and later athletic director lead to the Muleriders home gym to be named the W.T. Watson Athletic Center.

Southern Arkansas Coaching History
Tenure	Coach	Seasons	Won	Lost	Pct.	Conf. Champs.
1927–1937	Ves Godley	11	80	59	.576	1934, 1935
1937–1946	Unknown	n/a	n/a	n/a	n/a	n/a
1946–1954	Elmer Smith	7	108	74	.593	
1954–1957	P.T. "Duddy" Waller	3	45	24	.652	
1957–1963	Delwin T. Ross	6	39	86	.312	
1963–1980	W.T. Watson	17	300	151	.665	1966, 1967, 1971
1980–1997	Monroe Ingram	17	257	193	.571	1990
1997–1998	Burt West	1	12	14	.462	
1998–2005	Brian Daugherty	7	84	106	.442	
2005–2012	Eric Bozeman	7	73	116	.386	
2012–Present	Andy Sharpe	9	127	118	.518	2021
TOTAL		85	1,125	941	.545	7 (1934, 1935, 1966, 1967, 1971, 1990, 2021)

== Players ==
=== 1500 Point Club ===
Six players have scored more than 1,500 points in their Mulerider careers.

1500 Point Club
No.	Player	Year
2290	John Holmes	1986–1990
1886	Greg Alexander	1975–1979
1647	Calvin Thomas	1949–1954
1609	Alfred Flanigan	1968–1972
1604	Billy Barnes	1967–1971
1556	Shawn Mason	1998–2002

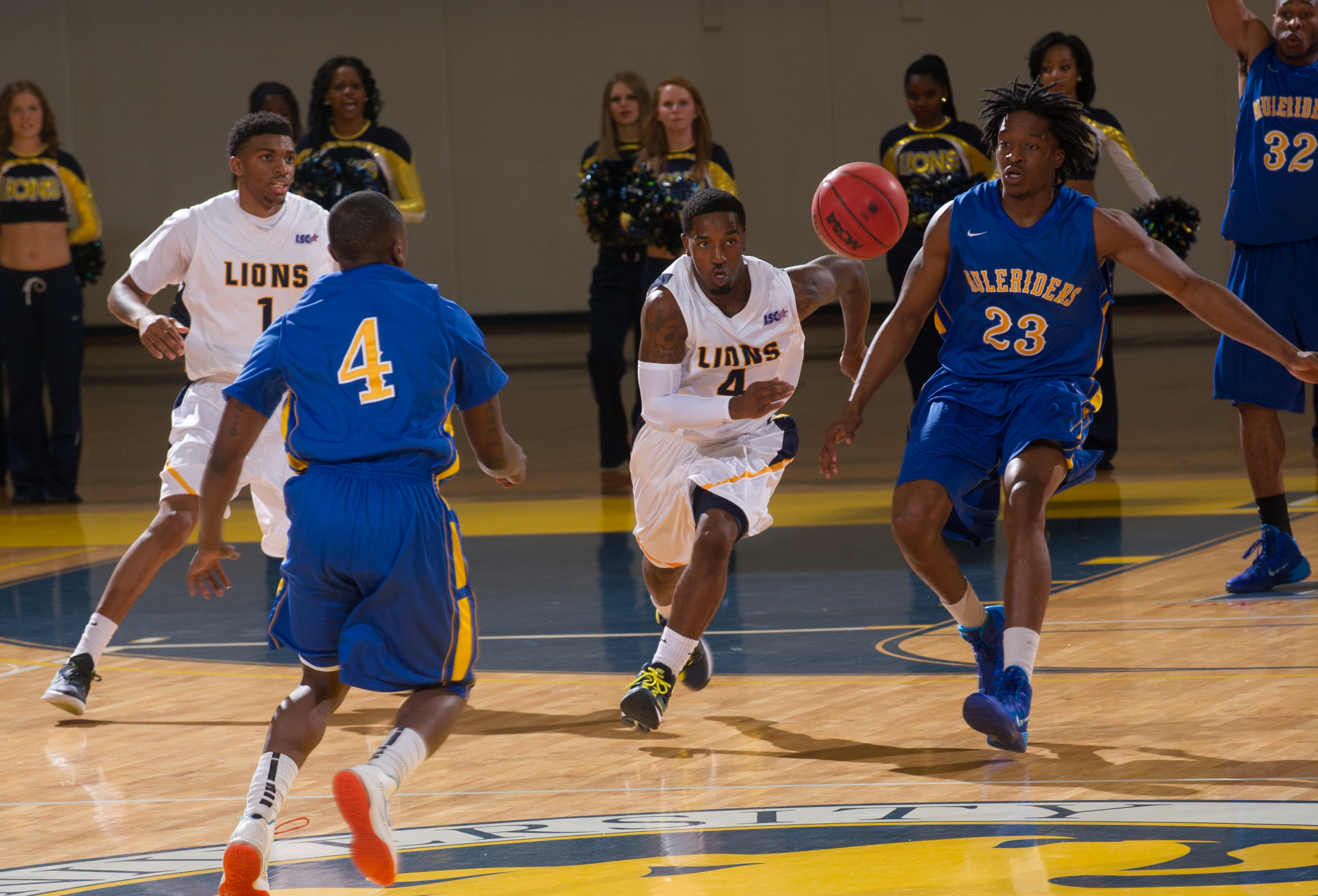
The Muleriders men's basketball team in action against the Texas A&M–Commerce Lions in 2013

=== All-Americans ===
Eight players have been named to an All-American team a total of ten times.

All-Americans
No.	Player	Year
1968–1969	Donnie Denton	HM
1970–1971	Billy Barnes	HM
1973–1974	James Armstrong	HM
1973–1974	Johnny White	HM
1978–1979	Greg Alexander	HM
1987–1988	Dwayne Smith	HM
1988–1989	John Holmes	2nd
1989–1990	John Holmes	1st
1990–1991	John Holmes	1st
1993–1994	Cedric Williams	HM

== Postseason results ==
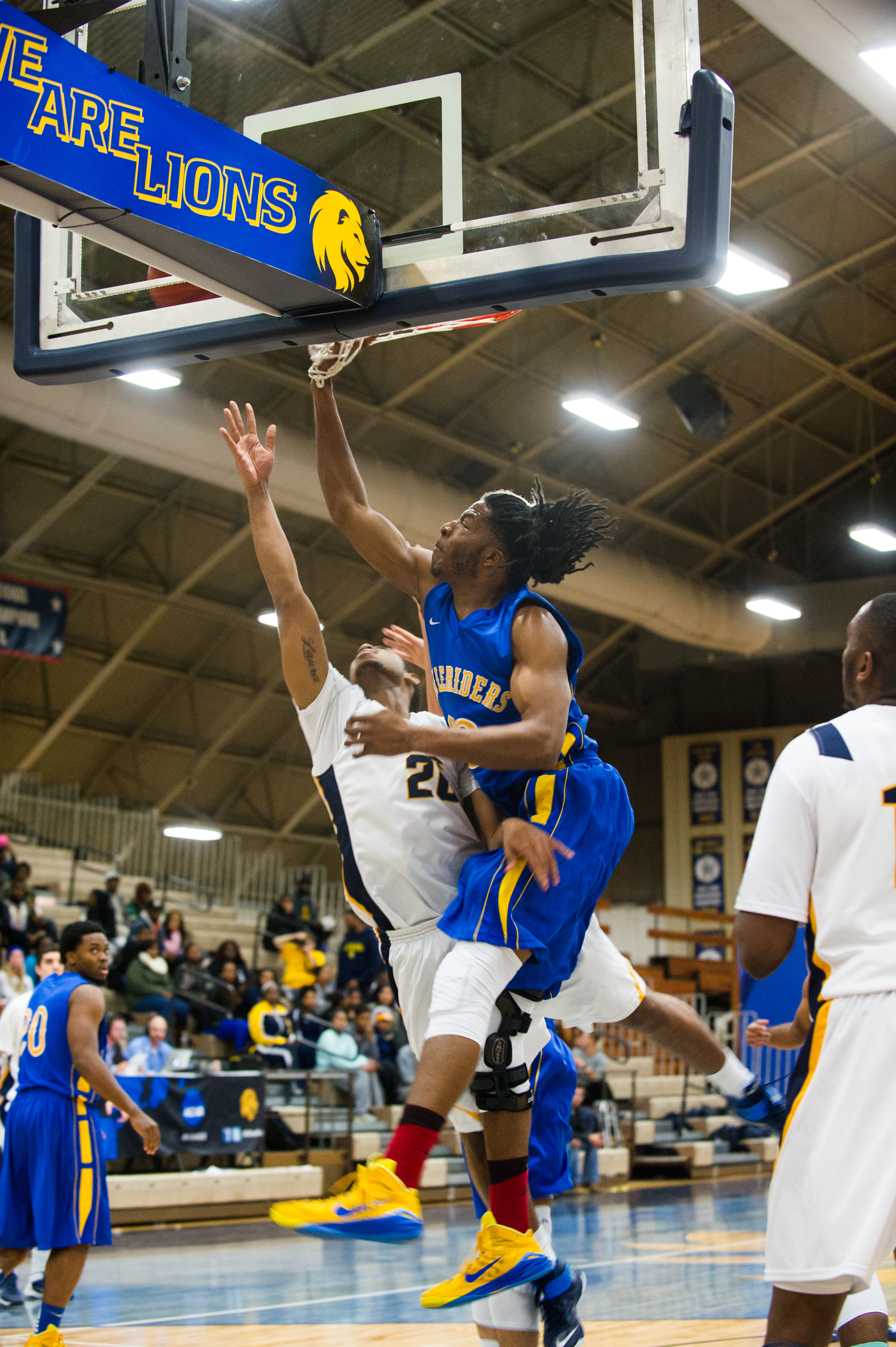
The Muleriders men's basketball team in action against Texas A&M–Commerce in 2014

=== NAIA National Tournament results ===
Southern Arkansas has appeared in the NAIA National Tournament six times. Their combined record is 2–6.

Year	Round	Opponent	Result/Score
1957	First Round	Western Illinois	L 70–101
1966	First Round; Second Round	Guilford, NC; Georgia Southern	W 72–67; L 62–80
1967	First Round; Second Round	East Montana; St. Benedict's	W 75–62; L 56–67
1971	First Round	Eau Claire	L 50–66
1983	First Round	Ft. Hayes St.	L 65–71
1989	First Round	Siena Heights	L 70–83

== Arena ==
The W.T. Watson Center, a 2,500-seat multipurpose arena, is home to the SAU men's and women's basketball teams, as well as the SAU volleyball team.
