= Steve "Snapper" Jones =

American basketball player (1942–2017)

Steve Jones
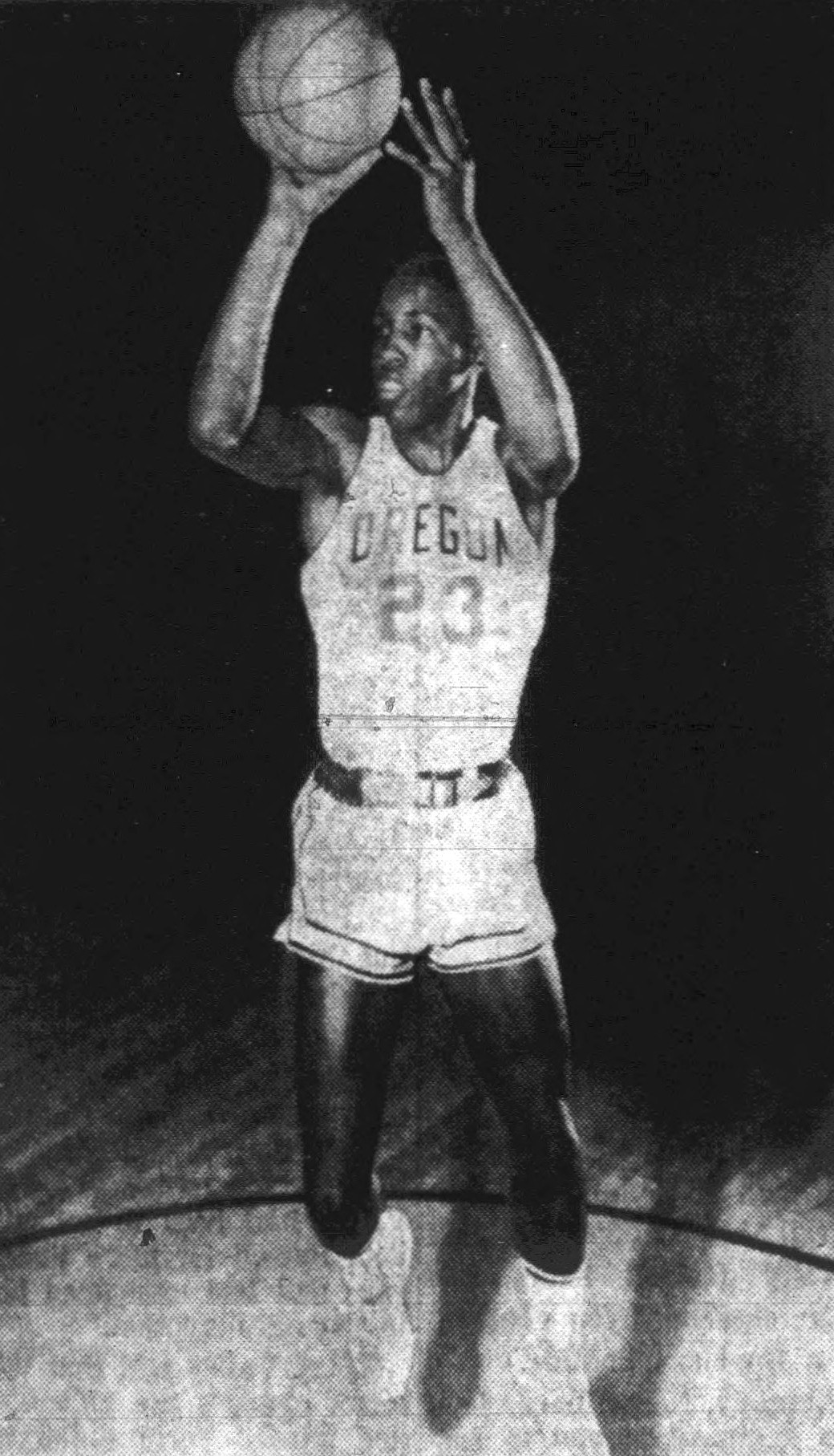
- Jones, circa 1963

Personal information
- Born: October 17, 1942 Alexandria, Louisiana, U.S.
- Died: November 25, 2017 (aged 75) Houston, Texas, U.S.
- Listed height: 6 ft 5 in (1.96 m)
- Listed weight: 205 lb (93 kg)

Career information
- High school: Franklin (Portland, Oregon)
- College: Oregon (1961–1964)
- NBA draft: 1964: undrafted
- Playing career: 1967–1976
- Position: Shooting guard
- Number: 12, 11, 23, 15

Career history
- 1967–1968: Oakland Oaks
- 1968–1971: New Orleans Buccaneers / Memphis Pros
- 1971–1973: Dallas Chaparrals
- 1973–1974: Carolina Cougars
- 1974: Denver Rockets
- 1974–1975: Spirits of St. Louis
- 1975–1976: Portland Trail Blazers

Career highlights
- 3× ABA All-Star (1970–1972)
- Stats at NBA.com
- Stats at Basketball Reference

Stephen Howard "Snapper" Jones Sr. (October 17, 1942 – November 25, 2017) was an American basketball player in the American Basketball Association (ABA) and National Basketball Association (NBA), and later a television analyst. He was a three-time ABA All-Star. Jones' brother Nick also played in the ABA and NBA. During his time in the ABA, Jones picked up the moniker "Snapper" but he never revealed how it came to be.

== Biography ==
=== Basketball career ===
Jones was born in Alexandria, Louisiana, but grew up in Portland, Oregon, where he led Franklin High School to the state basketball championship in 1959. He went on to a standout career at the University of Oregon, pacing the Ducks in scoring during the 1963–64 season.

Jones earned ABA All-Star honors three times during eight ABA seasons, averaging 16.0 points while scoring over 10,000 points in 640 games. Jones played for the Oakland Oaks (1967–68), New Orleans Buccaneers/Memphis Pros (1968–1971), Dallas Chaparrals (1971–1973), Carolina Cougars (1973–1974), Denver Rockets (1974) and Spirits of St. Louis (1974–1975). Jones was a three time ABA All Star, shot 34% from three-point range and never in his career had a technical foul called against him.

Jones then jumped leagues and finished his professional playing career in the NBA out with the Portland Trail Blazers in 1975–76.

=== Broadcasting career ===
Jones' broadcasting career began in 1976 (the season after he retired as a player with the Portland Trail Blazers), when he became a color commentator for CBS. He was part of the network's crew that handled the Blazers championship game against the Philadelphia 76ers. He also served as color analyst for the Blazers that year and stayed on into the 1990s. Jones' other broadcasting credits include stints with TNT, TBS, USA Network and the Denver Nuggets. Jones joined NBC shortly after the network obtained the rights to telecast NBA games prior to the 1990–91 season.

After serving as an analyst on The NBA on NBC for 13 years, Jones then worked the same position for NBA TV.

One of Jones' career highlights was his assignment as basketball analyst with Chick Hearn and Jim Durham in Barcelona, as part of the NBC coverage of men's basketball during the 1992 Olympic Games. In that capacity he worked the equivalent of almost one-half of an NBA season, 36 games, in just two weeks.

When he worked at NBC, Jones was typically paired up with former NBA teammate Bill Walton for NBA games due to the point-counterpoint style of banter between the two. He gained notoriety while announcing with Bill Walton for reining in his verbose outbursts, often responding to Walton's sometimes sensational statements with phrases such as "Bill, you can't be serious..." Though they typically argued and disagreed during games, the two had a mutual respect for each other and remained good friends. They reunited on Walton's short-lived TV show Bill Walton's Long Strange Trip.

=== Health decline and death ===
Jones' health began declining in 2005 when he suffered an appendicitis attack while on assignment in New York. His younger brother, Nick Jones stated, "My brother was a very strong guy. He fought for life for a long time."

Jones died on November 25, 2017, in Houston, Texas, at the age of 75. His older brother Roman had died earlier the same week. He was survived by his younger brother, Nick Jones, his mother and sisters, his wife Carol, two daughters, and a son, Steve Jones Jr.

== Career statistics ==
Legend
GP	Games played	GS	Games started	MPG	Minutes per game
FG%	Field goal percentage	3P%	3-point field goal percentage	FT%	Free throw percentage
RPG	Rebounds per game	APG	Assists per game	SPG	Steals per game
BPG	Blocks per game	PPG	Points per game	**Bold**	Career high
*	Led the league

=== ABA/NBA ===
==== Regular season ====
Year	Team	GP	GS	MPG	FG%	3P%	FT%	RPG	APG	SPG	BPG	PPG
1967–68	Oakland (ABA)	76		25.7	.418	.426	.798	4.5	1.5			10.1
1968–69	New Orleans (ABA)	78		**38.8**	.420	.344	.796	**5.0**	2.9			19.9
1969–70	New Orleans (ABA)	**84***		37.1	.442	.227	.832	4.6	2.3			21.5
1970–71	Memphis (ABA)	83		35.2	.470	.370	.830	3.6	2.2			**22.1**
1971–72	Dallas (ABA)	**84**		36.8	.426	.333	**.870**	3.8	2.8			18.3
1972–73	Dallas (ABA)	13		35.3	.439	**.667**	.797	3.5	2.7			17.0
1972–73	Carolina (ABA)	67		24.9	**.500**	.393	.815	2.7	1.3			12.7
1973–74	Carolina (ABA)	44		21.3	.441	.000	.746	2.2	1.3	.3	**.2**	8.3
1973–74	Denver (ABA)	42		27.5	.448	.361	.771	3.3	**3.0**	.3	.1	13.7
1974–75	St. Louis (ABA)	69		27.3	.439	.211	.830	2.8	2.9	**.8**	.1	10.9
1975–76	Portland (NBA)	64		12.8	.442		.830	1.2	1.0	.3	.1	6.5
Career (ABA)		640		31.6	.444	.338	.822	3.7	2.3	.5	.1	16.0
Career (overall)		704		29.9	.444	.338	.822	3.5	2.2	.4	.1	15.2
All-Star (ABA)		3	0	19.3	.440	1.000	1.000	3.3	1.3			10.7

==== Playoffs ====
Year	Team	GP	MPG	FG%	3P%	FT%	RPG	APG	SPG	BPG	PPG
1969	New Orleans (ABA)	11	38.9	.414	.267	.740	4.9	1.6			16.8
1971	Memphis (ABA)	4	**40.8**	.443	.286	**1.000**	**5.3**	2.3			**22.8**
1972	Dallas (ABA)	4	34.3	.476	.000	.857	4.8	**2.8**			19.5
1973	Carolina (ABA)	**12**	30.7	.452	**.500**	.810	3.0	.8			13.2
1975	St. Louis (ABA)	6	21.3	**.489**	.000	.647	2.3	2.3	.3	.5	9.2
Career (overall)		37	33.1	.444	.267	.787	3.9	1.6	.3	.5	15.3
