= McCarthy Gymnasium =

Indoor arena in Starkville, Mississippi

Coordinates: 33.452977°N 88.792673°W

McCarthy Gymnasium was a 3,000-seat multi-purpose arena located on the Mississippi State University campus. It opened in 1950 directly east of the "Tin Gym", MSU's previous on-campus arena that had opened in 1929. It was originally known as the Mississippi State Gymnasium, or the New Gym for short. When it opened, the facility held over 5,000 people. It was renamed for former MSU men's basketball coach James H. "Babe" McCarthy after his death in 1975. The facility had a seating capacity of 5,000 when it first opened in 1950, but capacity was reduced to the current 3,000 when retractable seating was removed. It was home to the Mississippi State University Bulldogs basketball teams until the Humphrey Coliseum opened in 1975 and was home to the MSU Tennis teams from 1999 until 2023.

McCarthy gym was home to some of State's most successful basketball teams. The most prominent of those teams were led by Head Coach James H. "Babe" McCarthy. McCarthy led State to SEC Championships in 1959, '61, '62, and '63. He was 169–85 overall, including a 99–20 mark at the MSU Gym.

In 1999 the facility was converted into a two-court indoor tennis complex. The facility was used primarily for practices in times of inclement weather, but also served as a competitive arena when matches at MSU's primary outdoor stadium, the A.J. Pitts Tennis Centre, were in jeopardy. When the championship match of the 2000 SEC Men's Tennis Tournament was forced indoors, the deciding matches were played at McCarthy Gym, with Florida downing Georgia for the title. Additionally, one match in both the 2012 and 2013 NCAA Men's Tennis Championship First and Second Rounds, which MSU hosted, were also contested in the facility.

The building was demolished in 2023 to make way for the Jim and Thomas Duff Center.
