= 1970 ABA All-Star Game =

Exhibition basketball game

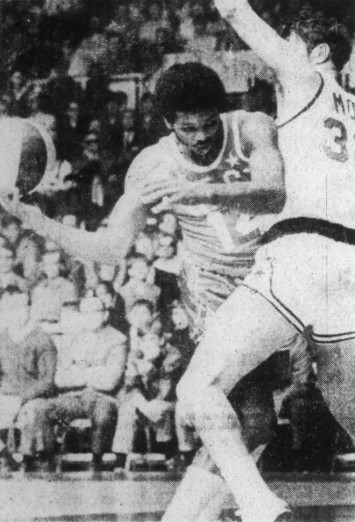
Western Conference guard Warren Jabali drives to the hoop as Eastern Conference forward Doug Moe guards him closely during the 1970 ABA All-Star Game on January 24, 1970, at the Indiana State Fair Coliseum in Indianapolis, Indiana.

The third American Basketball Association All-Star Game was played on January 24, 1970, at Indiana State Fair Coliseum in Indianapolis, Indiana before an audience at 11,932. Bobby Leonard of the Indiana Pacers coached the East, with Babe McCarthy of the New Orleans Buccaneers coached the West.

== Results ==
Rookie Spencer Haywood of the Denver Rockets was named MVP of the game after a 23-point, 19 rebounds, and 7-blocked shot performance. Haywood would go on to be named ABA Rookie of the Year and ABA MVP for the regular season that same year.

Score by Periods:	1	2	3	4	Final
West	34	27	25	42	128
East	18	23	33	24	98

== Western Conference ==
Player, Team	MIN	FGM	FGA	3PM	3PA	FTM	FTA	REB	AST	PTS
Spencer Haywood, DNR	39	10	19	0	0	3	4	19	2	23
Larry Jones, DNR	36	10	20	0	0	10	13	6	5	30
Rick Barry, WSA	27	7	12	0	0	2	2	7	7	16
Cincinnatus Powell, DAL	26	5	9	0	0	2	2	7	0	12
Steve Jones, NOB	18	4	9	0	0	6	6	5	1	14
John Beasley, DAL	18	5	7	1	1	0	0	8	0	11
Warren Jabali, WSA	15	1	3	0	0	2	2	2	1	4
Larry Brown, WSA	15	0	2	0	0	3	3	3	3	3
Jimmy Jones, NOB	14	0	3	0	2	0	0	3	0	0
Glen Combs, DAL	12	4	6	2	4	0	0	3	1	10
Gerald Govan, NOB	11	1	2	0	0	0	1	4	0	2
Warren Davis, LAS	9	1	3	0	1	1	1	2	0	3
Red Robbins, NOB (injured)
Totals	240	48	95	3	8	29	33	69	20	128

== Eastern Conference ==
Player, Team	MIN	FGM	FGA	3PM	3PA	FTM	FTA	REB	AST	PTS
Bob Netolicky, IND	33	7	18	0	0	1	4	8	2	15
Roger Brown, IND	28	5	10	0	0	5	6	6	2	15
Louie Dampier, KEN	26	7	16	1	6	2	3	3	1	17
Mel Daniels, IND	26	6	14	0	0	1	3	12	1	13
Doug Moe, CAR	26	0	5	0	0	2	3	8	6	2
Donnie Freeman, MMF	24	4	16	0	0	2	3	4	5	10
Bob Verga, CAR	16	6	14	1	3	1	2	5	2	14
Levern Tart, NYN	13	1	8	0	0	0	0	3	1	3
Gene Moore, KEN	12	2	6	0	1	0	0	4	0	4
Darel Carrier, KEN	10	0	4	0	2	2	3	1	0	2
Freddie Lewis, IND	9	0	5	0	0	1	0	6	1	1
Charles Williams, PTP	7	1	5	0	2	0	0	0	1	2
Totals	240	39	121	2	14	17	29	60	22	98

- Halftime — West, 61–41
- Third Quarter — West, 86–74
- Officials: Earl Strom and John Vanak
- Attendance: 11,932
