= 1966 NAIA basketball tournament =

College basketball tournament

1966 NAIA men's basketball tournament
- Season: 1965–66
- Teams: 32
- Finals site: Municipal Auditorium; Kansas City, Missouri
- Champions: Oklahoma Baptist (1st title, 2nd title game, 2nd Final Four)
- Runner-up: Georgia Southern (1st title game, 1st Final Four)
- Semifinalists: Grambling (La.) (3rd Final Four); Norfolk State (Va.) (1st Final Four)
- Coach of the year: Ted Kjolhede (Central Michigan)
- MVP: Al Tucker (Oklahoma Baptist)
- Top scorer: Al Tucker (Oklahoma Baptist) (182 points)

The 1966 NAIA men's basketball tournament was held in March at Municipal Auditorium in Kansas City, Missouri. The 29th annual NAIA basketball tournament featured 32 teams playing in a single-elimination format. This tournament featured the game with the most points scored. Al Tucker received the MVP award for the second time this year.

== Awards and honors ==
- Leading scorer: Al Tucker, Oklahoma Baptist; 5 games, 69 field goals, 44 free throws, 182 total points (36.4 average points per game)
- Leading rebounder: Richard Pitts, Norfolk State (Va.); 5 games, 76 total rebounds (15.2 average rebounds per game)
- Player of the Year: est. 1994
- Most team points; single-game: 132, Norfolk State (Va.) vs. Upper Iowa 97
- Most team points; tournament: 521, Norfolk State (Va.), (104.2 avg.)
- Most field goals made; single-game: 57, Norfolk State (Va.) vs. Upper Iowa
- Most field goals made; tournament: 216, Norfolk State (Va.)
- Top single-game performances: Earl Beechum 11th, Midwestern State (Texas) vs. Monmouth (N.J.); 20 field goals, 6 free throws 46 total points
- All-time leading scorer; second appearance: Al Tucker 2nd, Oklahoma Baptist (1965,66,67); 15 games, 177 field goals, 117 free throws, 471 total points (31.4 points per game).

== 1966 NAIA bracket ==
First round	Second round
1	Central State (Ohio)	92
-	St. Thomas (Minn.)	69
1	Central State (Ohio)	72
-	Lakeland	68
-	Lakeland (Wis.)	95
16	Linfield (Ore.)	81
TOP TIER
9	Norfolk State (Va.)	132
-	Upper Iowa	97
9	Norfolk State	103
-	Athens	81
-	Athens (Ala.)	88
8	Pittsburg State (Kan.)	79
5	Midwestern (Texas)	94
-	Monmouth (N.J.)	92
5	Midwestern	82
12	Illinois Wesleyan	96
-	Dickinson State (N.D.)	76
12	Illinois Wesleyan	86
TOP TIER
13	Guilford (N.C.)	67
-	Southern State (Ark.)	72
-	Southern State	62
4	Georgia Southern	80
-	Howard Payne (Texas)	80*
4	Georgia Southern	85
3	Grambling State (La.)	70
-	Central Washington State	65
3	Grambling State	95
-	Carroll (MT)	86
-	Carroll College (Montana)	91
14	Bethune-Cookman (Fla.)	88
BOTTOM TIER
-	Millersville State (Pa.)	86
10	Rockhurst (Mo.)	102
10	Rockhurst	97
7	Albuquerque	87
7	Albuquerque (N.M.)	81
-	New Haven (Conn.)	74
-	Edinboro State (Pa.)	53
6	Central Michigan	67
6	Central Michigan	70
11	Oklahoma Baptist	90
11	Oklahoma Baptist	80
-	California Western	76
BOTTOM TIER
15	Morris Harvey (W.Va.)	110
-	Peru State College (Neb.)	103*
15	Morris Harvey	74
2	Carson-Newman	103
-	Indiana Central	67
2	Carson-Newman (Tenn.)	68

Elite Eight
1	Central State (Ohio)	76
9	Norfolk State	88
12	Illinois Wesleyan	72
4	Georgia Southern	96
3	Grambling State	84
10	Rockhurst	82
11	Oklahoma Baptist	87
2	Carson-Newman	62

NAIA national semifinals
9	Norfolk State	88
4	Georgia Southern	89
3	Grambling State	80
11	Oklahoma Baptist	94

NAIA national championship
4	Georgia Southern	59
11	Oklahoma Baptist	88

- * denotes overtime.

=== Third-place game ===
The third-place game featured the losing teams from the national semifinalist to determine 3rd and 4th places in the tournament. This game was played until 1988.

NAIA third-place game
9	Norfolk State	110
3	Grambling State	111

== See also ==
- 1966 NCAA University Division basketball tournament
- 1966 NCAA College Division basketball tournament
