= Western Division (ABA) =

Geographical basketball group

The Western Division of the ABA, or ABA Western Division, was one of the two groups in which the teams of the American Basketball Association were divided, based on their geographical location. The other group was called the Eastern Division (ABA), or ABA Eastern Division.

The first four teams in each division entered the ABA Playoffs. The divisions were maintained until the 1974–75 season, since in the last season the 9 surviving teams were regrouped in a single division.

== Participating teams ==
The last teams that participated in the Western Division were the following:

- Denver Nuggets
- Indiana Pacers
- San Antonio Spurs
- San Diego Conquistadors
- Utah Stars

=== Other teams ===
Transferred to Eastern Division

- New Orleans Buccaneers/Memphis Pros/Memphis Tams/Memphis Sounds
- Houston Mavericks/Carolina Cougars/Spirits of St. Louis
- Oakland Oaks/Washington Caps/Virginia Squires

== Western Conference champions ==
In bold also the ABA champions

- 1968: New Orleans Buccaneers
- 1969: **Oakland Oaks**
- 1970: Los Angeles Stars
- 1971: **Utah Stars**
- 1972: **Indiana Pacers**
- 1973: **Indiana Pacers**
- 1974: Utah Stars
- 1975: Indiana Pacers

== Titles ==
- 3: Los Angeles Stars / Utah Stars
- 3: Indiana Pacers
- 1: New Orleans Buccaneers
- 1: Oakland Oaks
