= Bob Bass =

American basketball coach and executive

Personal information
- Born: January 28, 1929 Tulsa, Oklahoma, U.S.
- Died: August 17, 2018 (aged 89) San Antonio, Texas, U.S.

Career information
- High school: Rogers (Tulsa, Oklahoma)
- College: Oklahoma Baptist (1947–1950)
- Coaching career: 1950–1976

Career history

Coaching
- 1950–1952: Cromwell HS
- 1952–1967: Oklahoma Baptist
- 1967–1968: Denver Rockets
- 1969–1971: Texas Tech
- 1971–1972: The Floridians
- 1973–1974: Memphis Tams
- 1974–1976, 1980, 1983– 1984, 1992: San Antonio Spurs

Career highlights
- As coach: NAIA champion (1966); NAIA Coach of the Year (1967); As executive: 2× NBA Executive of the Year (1990, 1997)

Robert Eugene Bass (January 28, 1929 – August 17, 2018) was an American basketball coach and executive who worked in college basketball, the American Basketball Association (ABA), and the National Basketball Association (NBA).

== Early life ==
Bass was born in Oklahoma on January 28, 1929. He studied at Tulsa Rogers High School in Oklahoma. He attended Oklahoma Baptist University in 1947, where he served as captain of the basketball team until his graduation in 1950. He later attended the University of Oklahoma, where he graduated with a master's degree.

== Basketball career ==
=== Coaching ===
Bass served as the head basketball coach at Oklahoma Baptist for 15 years and was named the NAIA Coach of the Year in 1967. He led the Bison to the National Finals in 1965. The following year, his team won the 1966 NAIA national title. They returned to the Finals once more in 1967.

Bass' professional coaching career started with the Denver Rockets (now the Denver Nuggets) of the American Basketball Association in 1967, which he coached for two seasons. In 1969, Bass was hired as head coach of the Texas Tech Red Raiders replacing Gene Gibson. Bass cited a challenge to return to the college game and a distaste for the long pro season and its demands on his time away from family for accepting the position of head coach at Texas Tech.

In his first season, the Red Raiders posted a 14–10 record under Bass and finished third in the Southwest Conference (SWC) regular season standings. The 1969–70 team posted the first winning season for the Red Raiders in four years.

On January 15, 1971, Bass resigned to take the same position with The Floridians of the American Basketball Association after coaching the first 13 games of the 1970–71 Red Raiders season; assistant coach Gerald Myers was named interim head coach (he would be hired on a full-time basis for Tech until 1991). The following day, Bass served as coach for The Floridians in their 123–119 win over the Utah Stars in Miami.

He coached The Floridians of the ABA for two years before the team folded at the end of the 1972 season. The next season, he coached the Memphis Tams.

28 games into the 1974-75 ABA season, Bass was hired by the San Antonio Spurs to replace Tom Nissalke. Bass energized crowds with his team's style of "schoolyard basketball". George Gervin credited Bass as important to his career, once stating that he was "a Hall of Famer because of him."; Bass changed Gervin's role on the team from forward to being in the backcourt. Bass orchestrated a blockbluster trade for Larry Kenon in 1975. The Spurs survived the dissolution of the ABA and became part of the ABA–NBA merger in 1976. The Spurs were one win away from the ABA Finals in the 1976 ABA playoffs, losing to the New York Nets in seven games.

=== General manager ===
On May 24, 1976, Bass was removed as head coach of the Spurs by team president Angelo Drossos and eventually was moved to general manager. Doug Moe became head coach. Bass would, over the years with the team, assume coaching duties on an interim basis as needed—in 1980 (when Moe was fired), 1984, and 1992. He finished his coaching career with a 311–300 record. Various players that Bass acquired to play for the Spurs included David Robinson and Avery Johnson. Bass drafted David Robinson with the first overall pick in the 1987 NBA draft despite knowing that Robinson, a graduate of the Naval Academy, had two years of military service to do before he could play basketball. Bass and the front office convinced Robinson to not re-enter the draft and stay with the Spurs. Bass made a trade for Terry Cummings before the start of the 1989-90 season to go along with the rookie Robinson and Maurice Cheeks. The result was that the Spurs went from 21 wins in the previous season to 56 wins. Bass won the NBA Executive of the Year Award after the year ended. In 20 seasons with the franchise, Bass saw the Spurs reach the postseason seventeen times with him serving as either coach, general manager or vice president of basketball operations.

In May 1994, Bass left the Spurs to become general manager of the Charlotte Hornets to replace Dave Twardzik. He soon traded Alonzo Mourning for Glen Rice, Matt Geiger, Khalid Reeves and a 1996 first-round draft pick. After a middling 1995–96 season, he fired Allan Bristow and replaced him with Dave Cowens. He traded for players such as Vlade Divac on the day of the NBA draft and sent Larry Johnson (who had signed a twelve-year deal in 1993) to the New York Knicks for Anthony Mason and Brad Lohaus. The Hornets won 54 games (a franchise record) and Bass won his second Executive of the Year award. The Hornets moved to New Orleans in 2002, and Bass stayed with the team, which saw him draft David West with the 18th overall pick in the 2003 NBA draft. Bass retired in 2004, having seen the Hornets never finish with a losing record under his tenure.

== Personal life ==
In later years, Bass was diagnosed with Parkinson's disease. Bass suffered two strokes in August 2018. He died in his San Antonio home on August 17, 2018, at the age of 89; he was survived by his wife of 68 years.

== Head coaching record ==
=== College ===
Record table
Season	Team	Overall	Conference	Standing	Postseason
Oklahoma Baptist Bison (Oklahoma Collegiate Conference) (1952–1967)
1952–53	Oklahoma Baptist	9–17			
1953–54	Oklahoma Baptist	7–15			
1954–55	Oklahoma Baptist	15–11			
1955–56	Oklahoma Baptist	16–9			
1956–57	Oklahoma Baptist	20–9			
1957–58	Oklahoma Baptist	19–8			NAIA First Round
1958–59	Oklahoma Baptist	14–13			
1959–60	Oklahoma Baptist	25–6			NAIA Second Round
1960–61	Oklahoma Baptist	13–11			
1961–62	Oklahoma Baptist	24–9			
1962–63	Oklahoma Baptist	21–7			NAIA First Round
1963–64	Oklahoma Baptist	16–10			
1964–65	Oklahoma Baptist	25–7			NAIA Runner-up
1965–66	Oklahoma Baptist	26–7			NAIA Champions
1966–67	Oklahoma Baptist	25–7			NAIA Runner-up
Oklahoma Baptist:		275–146			
Texas Tech Red Raiders (Southwest Conference) (1969–1971)
1969–70	Texas Tech	14–10	8–6	T–3rd	
1970–71	Texas Tech	8–5 (Note: Bass resigned after the first 13 games of the 1970–71 season. Gerald Myers was named interim head coach for final 13 games.)	1–0		
Texas Tech:		22–15	9–6		
Total:		297–161			
National champion Postseason invitational champion Conference regular season champion Conference regular season and conference tournament champion Division regular season champion Division regular season and conference tournament champion Conference tournament champion

=== ABA and NBA ===
Legend
Regular season	G	Games coached	W	Games won	L	Games lost	W–L %	Win–loss %
Playoffs	PG	Playoff games	PW	Playoff wins	PL	Playoff losses	PW–L %	Playoff win–loss %

Team	Year	G	W	L	W–L%	Finish	PG	PW	PL	PW–L%	Result
Denver (ABA)	1967–68	78	45	33	.577	3rd in Western	5	2	3	.400	Lost in Division semifinals
Denver (ABA)	1968–69	78	44	34	.564	3rd in Western	7	3	4	.429	Lost in Division semifinals
Florida (ABA)	1970–71	36	19	17	.528	4th in Eastern	6	2	4	.333	Lost in Division semifinals
Florida (ABA)	1971–72	84	36	48	.429	4th in Eastern	4	0	4	.000	Lost in Division semifinals
Memphis (ABA)	1972–73	84	24	60	.286	5th in Eastern	—	—	—	—	Missed playoffs
San Antonio (ABA)	1974–75	56	33	23	.589	2nd in Western	6	2	4	.333	Lost in Division semifinals
San Antonio (ABA)	1975–76	84	50	34	.595	3rd in ABA	7	3	4	.429	Lost in Semifinals
San Antonio	1979–80	16	8	8	.500	3rd in Central	3	1	2	.333	Lost in first round
San Antonio	1983–84	51	26	25	.510	5th in Midwest	—	—	—	—	Missed playoffs
San Antonio	1991–92	44	26	18	.591	2nd in Midwest	3	0	3	.000	Lost in first round
ABA Career		500	251	249	.502		35	12	23	.343	
NBA Career		111	60	51	.541		6	1	5	.167	
Career Total		611	311	300	.509		41	13	28	.317	

== Notes ==
Preceded by Tom Nissalke	San Antonio Spurs head coach 1974–1976	Succeeded by Doug Moe
