= Gerald Govan =

American basketball player

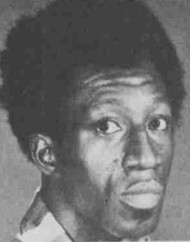
- Govan, circa 1973

Personal information
- Born: January 2, 1942 (age 84) Jersey City, New Jersey, U.S.
- Listed height: 6 ft 10 in (2.08 m)
- Listed weight: 220 lb (100 kg)

Career information
- High school: Snyder (Jersey City, New Jersey)
- College: St. Mary of the Plains (1960–1964)
- NBA draft: 1964: 11th round, 88th overall pick
- Drafted by: St. Louis Hawks
- Playing career: 1967–1976
- Position: Power forward / center
- Number: 25

Career history
- 1967–1970: New Orleans Buccaneers
- 1970–1972: Memphis Pros
- 1972–1975: Utah Stars
- 1975–1976: Virginia Squires

Career highlights
- ABA All-Star (1970)

Career ABA and NBA statistics
- Points: 5,251 (7.7 ppg)
- Rebounds: 7,119 (10.5 rpg)
- Assists: 2,164 (3.2 apg)
- Stats at Basketball Reference

Gerald Govan (born January 2, 1942) is a retired American professional basketball player. He played nine seasons in the American Basketball Association (ABA), from 1967 to 1976.

Born in Jersey City, New Jersey, Govan played high school basketball at Henry Snyder High School. He didn't plan to play college ball, thinking he was destined for a factory job, but his high school coach pushed him to apply.

A 6'10" forward/center from St. Mary of the Plains College in Dodge City, Kansas, Govan spent the year after his 1964 graduation playing pro ball in Italy. Govan spent nine years in the now-defunct American Basketball Association, playing for the New Orleans Buccaneers, Memphis Pros, Utah Stars and Virginia Squires. He tallied 5,251 career points and 7,119 career rebounds, and he appeared in the 1970 ABA All-Star Game.

Govan is one of only six players to have participated in each of the original ABA's nine seasons of existence. The others are Freddie Lewis, Byron Beck, Stew Johnson, Bob Netolicky and Louie Dampier. Govan appeared in 681 regular season ABA games—4th all-time, and tops among players who never played in the NBA.

Nicknamed Go-Go, he was one of the rare basketball players who wore spectacles, black-framed glasses in particular. He explained, "I tried contacts, but they bothered me. These glasses take away from my aggressiveness. I'm afraid of breaking them because if I do I got to pay for them myself."

Govan, the father of twin daughters, returned to Jersey City after his playing career ended and eventually worked as a probation officer for 25 years. He occasionally worked alongside fellow probation officer Bob Hurley, the longtime St. Anthony's High School basketball coach.
