= Jackie Moreland =

American basketball player (1938–1971)

Personal information
- Born: March 11, 1938 Minden, Louisiana, U.S.
- Died: December 19, 1971 (aged 33) New Orleans, Louisiana, U.S.
- Listed height: 6 ft 7 in (2.01 m)
- Listed weight: 215 lb (98 kg)

Career information
- High school: Minden (Minden, Louisiana)
- College: Louisiana Tech (1957–1960)
- NBA draft: 1960: 1st round, 4th overall pick
- Drafted by: Detroit Pistons
- Playing career: 1960–1970
- Position: Small forward / shooting guard
- Number: 15, 32

Career history
- 1960–1965: Detroit Pistons
- 1967–1970: New Orleans Buccaneers

Career highlights
- No. 44 retired by Louisiana Tech Bulldogs

Career NBA and ABA statistics
- Points: 5,730 (9.8 ppg)
- Rebounds: 3,417 (5.9 rpg)
- Assists: 937 (1.6 apg)
- Stats at NBA.com
- Stats at Basketball Reference

Jack Wade Moreland (March 11, 1938 – December 19, 1971), was an American basketball player for the Detroit Pistons and the former New Orleans Buccaneers. He played college basketball for the Louisiana Tech Bulldogs.

== Background ==
=== Minden High School ===
At Minden High School, Moreland averaged 60 percent from the floor, 90 percent from the free throw line, and 21.3 points and 26 rebounds per game. He set a Louisiana state record for making 27 consecutive free throws in a row. As of 2011, Moreland's 5,030 career high school points still ranked as the fourth-highest total for a high school basketball player in the United States. On April 2, 1956, Minden High School retired Jackie Moreland's number #44 marking the first time the high school bestowed this honor on one of its former athletes.

Moreland was a first baseman on Minden's baseball team where he led the team to an 18–2 record during his junior year.

== College career ==
=== Recruiting, semester at North Carolina State ===
Jackie Moreland was one of the most sought after basketball recruits in the nation with Kentucky, Texas A&M, North Carolina State, and Centenary College all seeking Moreland's services. All except Centenary eventually received NCAA probation for offenses related to the recruiting of Moreland. Although he was certainly taken advantage of to some extent, Moreland was also not without blame - A&M coach Ken Loeffler reported (in a SPORT magazine article by noted Atlanta journalist Furman Bisher in 1957) that the first thing Moreland said to him when he arrived at College Station for a campus visit was "What's the offer?". Moreland decided to enroll at North Carolina State, but never played a game with the Wolfpack. North Carolina State had allegedly offered Moreland cash and gifts including $1,000 cash, travel expenses, and a 7-year medical scholarship for his girlfriend in order to entice him to attend the university. Moreland was declared ineligible at North Carolina State for one year after recruiting violations involving Moreland and the university were discovered.

Moreland became a three-time All-American player while at Louisiana Tech University in Ruston under Coach Cecil C. Crowley.

His 1,419 collegiate points was the fourth highest in the history of Louisiana Tech, despite playing for only three, instead of the customary four, years for the Bulldogs. He completed three and a half-years at Tech, earning his Bachelor of Science degree in civil engineering. Moreland was also a three-year letterman for Louisiana Tech's baseball team from 1958 to 1960.

=== 1957–58 Season ===
After attending North Carolina State for a semester, Moreland transferred to Louisiana Tech, where he played in the Gulf States Conference. Moreland led Louisiana Tech in points and rebounds as Tech went 15–10 in his first year with the Bulldogs. He was named a UPI 2nd Team All-American and a member of the All-Gulf States Conference team.

During the season, Moreland set numerous single-game and single-season scoring and rebounding records. In 25 games, he scored 602 points which still stands as the record for most points by a Louisiana Tech Freshman in a single season. Moreland also netted 348 rebounds in 1957–58, a record that he broke the following season. He also set Freshmen records for most field goals made (218), field goal attempts (518), free throws made (166), and free throw attempts (218).

On December 10, 1957, Moreland scored 43 points against Arkansas Tech, a Louisiana Tech record that was not broken until Mike Green scored 47 points against Lamar on January 22, 1973. He also set single-game records that night for most free throws made (19), and free throws attempted (21) for any Louisiana Tech player. One week later against Eastern New Mexico, he scored 41 points which was the second-highest total by a Tech player in a single game. He also set single-game records for most field goals made (19) and field goal attempts (33) that stood until Mike Green broke both records during the 1972–1973 season.

=== 1958–59 Season ===
Moreland's second season at Louisiana Tech resulted in greater success for the Bulldog team and more individual honors for Moreland. He led the Louisiana Tech Bulldogs to the second 20-win season in the team's history. The Bulldogs finished the season with a 21–4 record, three victories in the Gulf South Classic against William & Mary, Northwestern State University at Natchitoches, Louisiana, and Virginia Tech, and the Gulf States Conference Title. Moreland was named a UPI Small College All-American (1st Team) and a member of the All-Gulf States Conference team marking the second straight year he received All-American and All-GSC honors. For a second straight season, Moreland led the Bulldogs in points (528) and rebounds (468). His rebounding total for the 1958–1959 season is still the all-time record for a Tech player in a single season.

Joining Moreland in receiving All American status was fellow Bulldog Ray Germany, later a basketball and baseball coach at Moreland's alma mater, Minden High School.

== Retirement and death ==
In 1970, Moreland said that he had "no regrets" regarding his eight-year sports career despite the recruitment issues: "I received a good education, was a No. 1 draft choice in the pros, and had a good pro-basketball career."

In August 1971, Moreland, at the age of 33, experienced severe stomach pains and was diagnosed with pancreatic cancer. The disease spread to the liver, the stomach, and throughout his whole body. Medical bills soared, and friends from across the state and from Detroit contributed to a fund to sustain the young family. He died months later.

Moreland was enshrined as a charter member of the Louisiana Tech University Athletic Hall of Fame in 1984. Louisiana Tech University maintains a Jackie Moreland Scholarship Fund.

== NCAA career statistics ==
Legend
GP	Games played	GS	Games started	MPG	Minutes per game
FG%	Field goal percentage	3P%	3-point field goal percentage	FT%	Free throw percentage
RPG	Rebounds per game	APG	Assists per game	SPG	Steals per game
BPG	Blocks per game	PPG	Points per game	**Bold**	Career high

Year	Team	GP	GS	MPG	FG%	3P%	FT%	RPG	APG	SPG	BPG	PPG
1957–58	Louisiana Tech	**25**	...	...	.424	...	.761	13.9	...	...	...	**24.1**
1958–59	Louisiana Tech	**25**	...	...	**.440**	...	.771	**18.7**	...	...	...	21.1
1959–60	Louisiana Tech	20	...	...	.391	...	**.795**	15.1	...	...	...	18.1
**Career**		70	...	...	.428	...	.773	16.0	...	...	...	21.3

== NBA career statistics ==
Legend
GP	Games played	GS	Games started	MPG	Minutes per game
FG%	Field goal percentage	3P%	3-point field goal percentage	FT%	Free throw percentage
RPG	Rebounds per game	APG	Assists per game	SPG	Steals per game
BPG	Blocks per game	PPG	Points per game	**Bold**	Career high

=== Regular season ===
Year	Team	GP	GS	MPG	FG%	3P%	FT%	RPG	APG	SPG	BPG	PPG
1960–61	Detroit	64	...	15.7	.400	...	.652	4.9	0.8	...	...	7.3
1961–62	Detroit	74	...	16.5	.421	...	.747	5.8	1.0	...	...	7.4
1962–63	Detroit	78	...	19.4	.436	...	.678	5.8	1.5	...	...	8.8
1963–64	Detroit	78	...	22.8	.426	...	.781	5.2	1.6	...	...	9.1
1964–65	Detroit	54	...	13.6	.348	...	.635	3.4	1.3	...	...	5.0
1967–68	New Orleans	76	...	30.7	**.437**	**.500**	.730	**8.1**	1.8	...	...	14.6
1968–69	New Orleans	78	...	**34.8**	.422	.250	.706	**8.1**	**2.7**	...	...	**14.9**
1969–70	New Orleans	**80**	...	29.0	.414	.250	**.790**	4.8	2.0	...	...	9.7
Career		582	...	23.4	.420	.300	.721	5.9	1.6	...	...	9.8

=== Playoffs ===
Year	Team	GP	GS	MPG	FG%	3P%	FT%	RPG	APG	SPG	BPG	PPG
1961	Detroit	3	...	15.0	.452	...	**.800**	6.0	1.0	...	...	10.7
1962	Detroit	7	...	13.7	**.515**	...	.571	3.4	1.0	...	...	5.4
1963	Detroit	4	...	20.5	.500	...	.700	5.0	1.5	...	...	8.3
1968	New Orleans	**17**	...	28.6	.435	.000	.678	6.7	**2.5**	...	...	12.2
1969	New Orleans	11	...	**31.1**	.396		.636	**7.2**	**2.5**	...	...	**12.6**
Career		42	...	25.0	.433	.000	.667	6.1	2.0	...	...	10.7
