= New Orleans Buccaneers =

- Conference: None
- Division: Western Division
- Founded: 1967
- History: New Orleans Buccaneers; 1967–1970; Memphis Pros; 1970–1972; Memphis Tams; 1972–1974; Memphis Sounds; 1974–1975; Baltimore Claws; 1975–76 (did not play)
- Arena: Loyola Field House (1967–1969); Tulane Gym (1969–1970) / Municipal Auditorium (1969–1970)
- Location: New Orleans, Louisiana
- Team colors: Red, white and blue
- Head coach: Babe McCarthy 1967–1970
- Ownership: Morton Downey Jr. L. Torrey Comila; Ronnie Kole; James A. Ware; Lionel J. Cunningham; Charles G. Smither; Maurice M. Stern
- Championships: 0
- Division titles: 1 (1968)

The New Orleans Buccaneers were a charter member of the American Basketball Association (ABA). After three seasons in New Orleans, Louisiana, the franchise moved to Memphis, Tennessee, where it became the Pros, Tams, and Sounds for four years before an abortive move to Baltimore in 1975.

== Origins ==
With the founding of the ABA on February 2, 1967, a charter franchise was awarded to a group of seven investors, including Morton Downey Jr. The group obtained their franchise for $1,000, as opposed to the $30,000 fronted by most other original teams. Charles G. Smither, one of the seven owners, served as team president; another of the investors, Maurice M. Stern, was operations manager. The team was named the New Orleans Buccaneers and former Mississippi State University head coach Babe McCarthy was signed as its first coach. Among the team's first players were Larry Brown, Gerald Govan, Jimmy Jones, Doug Moe, and Red Robbins.

== 1967–68 season ==
The Buccaneers played their home games at the Loyola Field House during their first season and averaged 2,337 fans per game there. Brown, Jones, Moe, and Robbins played in the ABA All-Star Game and McCarthy coached the West team in the game. Brown was the Most Valuable Player of the inaugural ABA All-Star game and led the ABA in assists that season en route to being named Second Team All-ABA. Moe was named First Team All-ABA and Jones made the ABA All-Rookie Team. The Buccaneers recruited Jackie Moreland, originally from Minden, who had played for the Detroit Pistons from 1960–1965.

The Buccaneers finished the season in first place in the Western Division with 48 wins and 30 losses, putting them two games ahead of the Dallas Chaparrals and three games ahead of the Denver Rockets. The Buccaneers then defeated the Rockets 3 games to 2 in the Western Division semifinals and then defeated the Chaparrals 4 games to 1 to win the Western Division championship. The Buccaneers then advanced to the first ever ABA Championship series, facing the Pittsburgh Pipers. The Buccaneers and Pipers split the first six games, but the Pipers won the decisive seventh game 122–113 to win the 1968 ABA championship.

== 1968–69 season ==
Prior to the season the Buccaneers traded away Brown and Moe to the Oakland Oaks in exchange for Steve Jones and Ron Franz. Robbins and Steve Jones played in the ABA All-Star Game. The Buccaneers finished the season with a record of 46 wins and 32 losses, which put them in second place in the Western Division, 14 games behind the Oaks, who had posted a remarkable 60-18 (.769) record. The Buccaneers drew an average of 2,834 fans per home game.

The Buccaneers met the Chaparrals in the Western Division semifinals and prevailed in a close series, 4 games to 3. Advancing to the Western Division finals, the Buccaneers fell to the Oakland Oaks 4 games to none.

== 1969–70 season ==
The Buccaneers moved their home games to Tulane Gym (now known as Devlin Fieldhouse) and the Municipal Auditorium for the season. Jimmy Jones suffered a knee injury in December that limited his action for the season; he was still selected to play in the ABA All-Star game along with teammates Steve Jones and Govan. McCarthy again coached the West team.

The Bucs finished at .500 with 42 wins and 42 losses. This placed the team in fifth (last) place in that season's highly competitive Western Division, keeping the Buccaneers out of the playoffs. (In the Eastern Division that season that record would have tied them for third place and put them in the playoffs.) For the season, New Orleans averaged 2,599 fans per home game.

== End of tenure in New Orleans ==
The team picked up Wendell Ladner in the draft and rechristened itself the Louisiana Buccaneers, planning to play its home games throughout the state during the 1970–71 season including in New Orleans, Shreveport, Lafayette, Monroe, and Baton Rouge. Like most ABA teams, the Bucs were never on strong financial ground, and the move to the smaller Tulane Gym combined with the marked dropoff in their play caused revenue to dry up. It was hoped that becoming a "regional" franchise would provide more capital.

However, on August 21, 1970, the franchise was purchased by a new owner from Mississippi named P. W. Blake, and ten days later, it was moved to Memphis, Tennessee and renamed the Memphis Pros.

The Buccaneers nickname was picked up by a new National Football League expansion team in 1976. Since 2002, the Tampa Bay Buccaneers and New Orleans Saints have competed against each other in the NFC South division.

On December 10, 2008, in a game against the Charlotte Bobcats, the Buccaneers were for the first time "revived" by the New Orleans Hornets, the city's National Basketball Association franchise, who played the game in 1967–68 styled Bucs throwback jerseys. The team's cheerleading squad was also dressed in Bucs throwback outfits, Bucs video highlights were played throughout the game, and many of the team's past players and coaches were honored at halftime. The Hornets would win the game 105–89. The Hornets wore their Buccaneers throwback jerseys once again in a road game against the Cleveland Cavaliers on January 16, 2009, with Cleveland coming out on top 92–78.

== Basketball Hall of Famers ==
New Orleans Buccaneers Hall of Famers
Players
No.	Name	Position	Tenure	Inducted
11	Larry Brown ^{1}	G	1967–1968	2002

Notes:

- ^{1} Inducted as a coach.

== Season-by-season ==
ABA champions	ABA finalists	Division champions	Playoff berth

Season	League	Division	Finish	W	L	Win%	Playoffs	Awards
New Orleans Buccaneers
1967–68	ABA	Western	1st	48	30	.615	Won Division Semifinals (Rockets) 3–2; Won Division Finals (Chaparrals) 4–1; Lost ABA Finals (Pipers) 3–4	–
1968–69	ABA	Western	2nd	46	32	.590	Won Division Semifinals (Chaparrals) 4–3; Lost Division Finals (Oaks) 0–4	–
1969–70	ABA	Western	5th	42	42	.500	Did not qualify	–

== Notes ==
The Buccaneers' road uniform was featured in NBA Live 07 as a hidden jersey.
