= David Nash (basketball) =

American basketball player

Personal information
- Listed height: 6 ft 11 in (2.11 m)

Career information
- College: University of Kansas
- NBA draft: 1969: 4th round, 48th
- Drafted by: Chicago Bulls
- Position: Center

Career history
- Harlem Globetrotters
- Stats at Basketball Reference

David Nash is a retired professional American basketball player who is most known for his time with the Harlem Globetrotters. Nash finished his collegiate career with the Kansas Jayhawks in 1968 and was drafted in the 4th round of the 1969 NBA Draft by the Chicago Bulls. Due to his reach and 6'11" height, he was a natural for the center position. Nash now works as an educator on sleep apnea for the National Library of Medicine.
