= 1969–70 ABA season =

3rd edition of the ABA Championship

- League: American Basketball Association
- Sport: Basketball
- Duration: October 17, 1969 – May 25, 1970
- Games: 84
- Teams: 11

Regular season
- Top seed: Indiana Pacers
- Season MVP: Spencer Haywood (Denver)
- Top scorer: Spencer Haywood (Denver)

Playoffs
- Eastern champions: Indiana Pacers
- Eastern runners-up: Kentucky Colonels
- Western champions: Los Angeles Stars
- Western runners-up: Denver Rockets

Finals
- Champions: Indiana Pacers
- Runners-up: Los Angeles Stars

ABA seasons
- ← 1968–69 1970–71 →

The 1969–70 ABA season was the third season of the American Basketball Association. Prior to the start of the season, the Minnesota Pipers moved back to Pittsburgh, the Oakland Oaks moved to Washington, D.C., and became the Washington Caps and the Houston Mavericks moved to North Carolina and became the Carolina Cougars. For the regular-season, the schedule was increased from 78 to 84 games per team. The season ended with the Indiana Pacers capturing their first ABA Championship.

By April of 1970, rumblings of a merger were reported in the press, with one reported offer having the league pay $11 million in indemnities while agreeing to move the Washington franchise out of its location. The NBA Players Association was felt to be an obstacle for any plans of a merger, as they had voted to strike in the event of such a merger. As it turned out, the merger would not occur until many years later with only a fraction of the ABA's teams making it in the final merger.

Spencer Haywood, a rookie from the University of Detroit, led the ABA in scoring (30.0 ppg) and rebounding (19.5 rpg) for the Denver Rockets. Haywood was professional basketball's first "hardship case", leaving college after his sophomore season. The NBA prohibited him from declaring for its draft, and he signed with the Rockets instead, leading them to the Western Division championship.

Coaching changes
Offseason
Team	1968–69 coach	1969–70 coach
Carolina Cougars	Jim Weaver	Bones McKinney
Denver Rockets	Bob Bass	John McLendon
New York Nets	Max Zaslofsky	York Larese
Pittsburgh Pipers	Gus Young	John Clark
Washington Caps	Alex Hannum	Al Bianchi
In-season
Team	Outgoing coach	Incoming coach
Dallas Chaparrals	Cliff Hagan	Max Williams
Denver Rockets	John McLendon	Joe Belmont
Miami Floridians	Jim Pollard	Harold Blitman
Pittsburgh Pipers	John Clark	Buddy Jeannette

== Teams ==
1969–70 American Basketball Association
Division	Team	City	Arena	Capacity
Eastern	Carolina Cougars	Greensboro, North Carolina; Charlotte, North Carolina; Raleigh, North Carolina	Greensboro Coliseum; Charlotte Coliseum; Dorton Arena	15,000; 9,605; 7,610
Eastern	Indiana Pacers	Indianapolis, Indiana	Indiana State Fair Coliseum	10,000
Eastern	Kentucky Colonels	Louisville, Kentucky	Louisville Convention Center	6,000
Eastern	Miami Floridians	Miami, Florida	Dinner Key Auditorium; Miami-Dade Junior College North Gym	6,900; N/A
Eastern	New York Nets	West Hempstead, New York	Island Garden	5,200
Eastern	Pittsburgh Pipers	Pittsburgh, Pennsylvania	Civic Arena	12,580
Western	Dallas Chaparrals	University Park, Texas; Dallas, Texas	Moody Coliseum; Dallas Memorial Auditorium	8,998; 9,815
Western	Denver Rockets	Denver, Colorado	Denver Auditorium Arena	6,841
Western	Los Angeles Stars	Los Angeles, California	Los Angeles Sports Arena	14,795
Western	New Orleans Buccaneers	New Orleans, Louisiana	Loyola Field House	6,500
Western	Washington Caps	Washington, D.C.	Washington Coliseum	7,000

=== Map of teams ===
Eastern Division Western Division

== Final standings ==
=== Eastern Division ===
Team	W	L	PCT.	GB
**Indiana Pacers** *	59	25	.702	—
Kentucky Colonels *	45	39	.536	14.0
Carolina Cougars *	42	42	.500	17.0
New York Nets *	39	45	.464	20.0
Pittsburgh Pipers	29	55	.345	30.0
Miami Floridians	23	61	.274	36.0

=== Western Division ===
Team	W	L	PCT.	GB
Denver Rockets *	51	33	.607	—
Dallas Chaparrals *	45	39	.536	6.0
Washington Caps *	44	40	.524	7.0
Los Angeles Stars *	43	41	.512	8.0
New Orleans Buccaneers	42	42	.500	9.0

Asterisk (*) denotes playoff team

Bold – ABA champions

== Regular season ==
On April 10, 1970, the Indiana Pacers would score a league record-high 177 points in a 177–135 win over the Pittsburgh Pipers at home. As of 2025, it remains the highest-scoring effort the Pacers have ever had either in the ABA or the NBA (with their most recent highest-scoring game in the NBA occurring on March 27, 2025, with a 162–109 blowout win over the Washington Wizards). On April 28, 1970, Spencer Haywood was named ABA MVP.

== Awards and honors ==
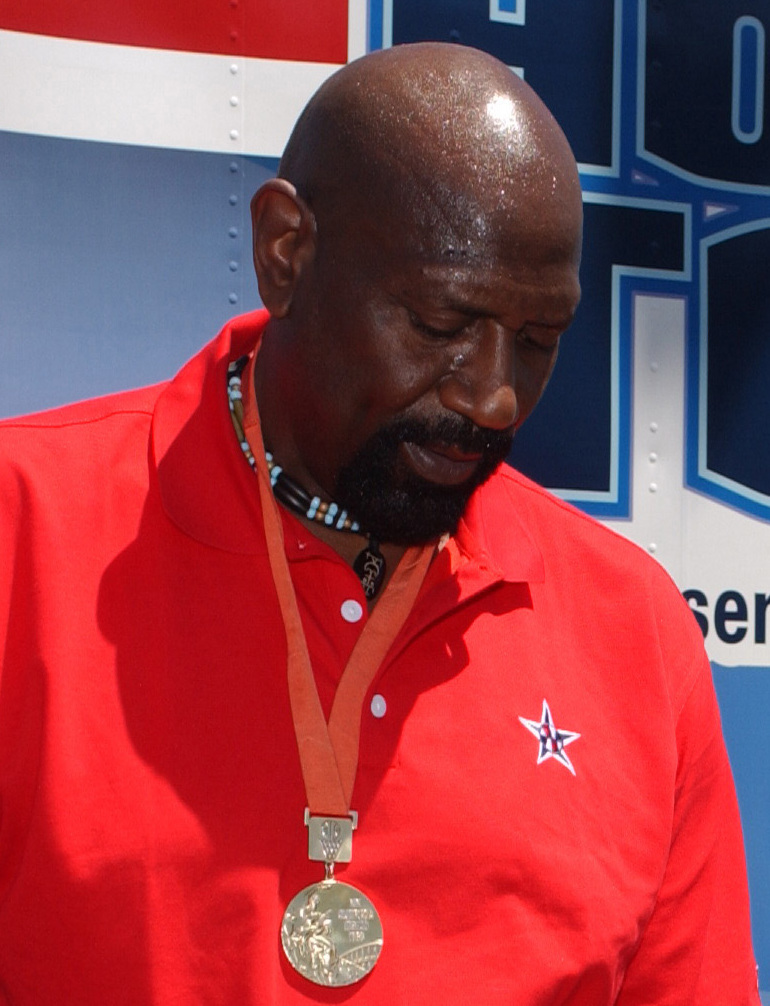
Spencer Haywood (Denver) was named ABA MVP and ROTY

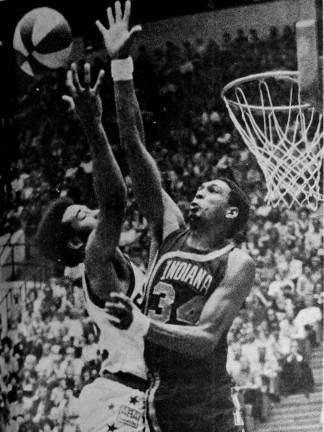
Mel Daniels (right) was named All-ABA First Team

- ABA Most Valuable Player Award: Spencer Haywood, Denver Rockets
- Rookie of the Year: Spencer Haywood, Denver Rockets
- Coach of the Year: Bill Sharman, Los Angeles Stars and Joe Belmont, Denver Rockets
- Playoffs MVP: Roger Brown, Indiana Pacers
- All-Star Game MVP: Spencer Haywood, Denver Rockets
- **All-ABA First Team**
  - Rick Barry, Washington Caps (2nd selection)
  - Spencer Haywood, Denver Rockets
  - Mel Daniels, Indiana Pacers (3rd selection)
  - Bob Verga, Carolina Cougars
  - Larry Jones, Denver Rockets (3rd selection)
- **All-ABA Second Team**
  - Roger Brown, Indiana Pacers (2nd selection)
  - Bob Netolicky, Indiana Pacers
  - Red Robbins, New Orleans Buccaneers (2nd selection)
  - Louie Dampier, Kentucky Colonels (3rd selection)
  - Donnie Freeman, Miami Floridians (2nd selection)
- **All-ABA Rookie Team**
  - Mike Barrett, Washington Caps
  - John Brisker, Pittsburgh Pipers
  - Mack Calvin, Los Angeles Stars
  - Spencer Haywood, Denver Rockets
  - Willie Wise, Los Angeles Stars
