= Miami Floridians =

American Basketball Association franchise

Miami Floridians The Floridians
- Conference: None
- Division: Eastern Division
- Founded: 1967
- History: Minnesota Muskies; 1967–1968; Miami Floridians; 1968–1970; The Floridians; 1970–1972
- Arena: Miami Beach Convention Center, Dade County Junior College, Dinner Key Auditorium, Curtis Hixon Hall, Bayfront Center, Jacksonville Coliseum
- Location: Miami, Florida; Tampa, Florida (1970–1972); St. Petersburg, Florida (1970–1972); Jacksonville, Florida (1970–1972)
- Team colors: Orange and Blue (1968–70); Black, Magenta and Orange (1970–72)
- Team manager: Dennis Murphy
- Head coach: Jim Pollard; 1968–1969; Jim Pollard & Harold Blitman; 1969–1970
- Ownership: L.P. Shields & Fred Jefferson; 1968–1969; Ned Doyle; 1970–1972

The Miami Floridians, later in their history known simply as The Floridians, were a professional basketball franchise in the original, now-defunct American Basketball Association (ABA). The Miami Floridians played in the ABA from 1968 through 1970 when they became simply The Floridians. The team had two color schemes: their original red, blue, and white, and their later black, magenta, and orange.

The Miami Floridians began as the Minnesota Muskies, a charter ABA franchise who played in Bloomington, Minnesota, at the Metropolitan Sports Center and wore blue and gold. The Muskies finished with the league's second-best record, but wretched attendance figures (officially 2,800 per game, a figure that was likely padded) led owner Larry Shields to conclude that the team could not be viable in the Twin Cities. He sold minority shares to a group of Florida businessmen and moved the team to Miami. However, in order to pay leftover debts in Minnesota, Shields sold Rookie of the Year Mel Daniels to the Indiana Pacers, a deal now reckoned as the most lopsided trade in ABA history.

== Move to Miami ==
The Floridians never attracted a large following, despite numerous promotions—including ballgirls wearing white bikinis and go-go boots. However, the team did manage to make the playoffs three out of the four years of their existence. The Floridians' first homes were the Miami Beach Convention Center and the Convention Center Annex. Coached by former Minneapolis Lakers great Jim Pollard, the 1968–69 season was the most successful for the Miami Floridians by far, finishing their first season in Florida with a 43–35 record and defeating the defending champion Minnesota Pipers (who played in the city the Floridians had just abandoned) in the Eastern Division semifinals 4 games to 3, before losing in the divisional finals to the Pacers 4 games to 1.

The 1969–70 season was largely forgettable for the Floridians. They split their home games between Dinner Key Auditorium and Miami-Dade Junior College's North Campus gym. Dinner Key, a former aircraft hangar, was perhaps the most infamous building in ABA history. It had no air conditioning and would often get quite hot inside, forcing management to throw open the doors; players would then have to adjust their shots by the ocean breezes that whistled onto the court. The Floridians dismissed Pollard during the season and named Hal Blitman of Cheyney State College as their head coach. The minority partners began taking a greater role in team operations, often trading players without Blitman's knowledge. Not surprisingly, given the constant turnover on the roster, the Floridians finished 23-61 and missed the playoffs. The team's original owners, Shields and Fred Jefferson, sold the Floridians at the end of the season.

== The Floridians ==
Following the 1969–70 season, new owner Ned Doyle dropped "Miami" from the team's name and made it a "regional" franchise, scheduling games in Miami (back at the Miami Beach Convention Center), in the Tampa Bay area at Curtis Hixon Hall and Bayfront Center, in Jacksonville at the Jacksonville Memorial Coliseum, and in West Palm Beach at the West Palm Beach Auditorium. In an unprecedented move, Doyle "fired" the entire team (all players were either traded or released prior to the start of their new season) and kept the coach. The team replaced Blitman after an 18–30 start with Bob Bass. Bass was able to turn the team around and the Floridians finished fourth in the Eastern Division with a record of 37–47. The Floridians made the playoffs, but lost their series to the Kentucky Colonels, 4–2.

For the 1971–72 season, the Floridians split their home games between Miami and Tampa. They again finished in fourth place in the Eastern Division, with a record of 36–48. Once again the team made the playoffs and once again they lost their series, this time to the Virginia Squires, 4–0.

The Floridians had to use the gymnasium of Dade County Junior College for their two playoff games, reportedly because the Convention Center had booked other events not thinking the team would make the playoffs. The dreadful attendance for their two home playoff games against the Squires convinced Doyle that the team could not be viable in South Florida. After a deal to relocate to Cincinnati fell through, attempts to find a bigger market in Albuquerque, San Diego, Montreal, and Omaha also turned up nil for different reasons. By June of 1972, rumblings of a potential merger between the ABA and the National Basketball Association (NBA) led to speculation that any attempt of it happening would leave the Floridians out, as they were listed as among the weak franchises in the league, alongside the Pittsburgh Condors and the Memphis Pros. On June 13, 1972, Commissioner Jack Dolph announced that the Condors and Floridians would be disbanded. Ironically, San Diego would end up getting their own ABA expansion team in the San Diego Conquistadors in what essentially became a replacement for both The Floridians and the Pittsburgh Condors (who also considered San Diego as an option to move their franchise before shutting down operations) months later. Big-time basketball wouldn't return to Florida until an NBA expansion team, the Miami Heat, played their first season in 1988. The Orlando Magic followed suit a year later.

The Heat franchise paid tribute to the Floridians franchise in recent years by wearing near replicas (the jerseys instead had "Miami" on the front to go along with a smaller "Floridians" wordmark on the shorts) of the 1970–71 (and 1971–72) Floridians home and away uniforms for several games in the 2005–06 and 2011–12 seasons as part of the NBA's "Hardwood Classics Night" program.

== Basketball Hall of Famers ==
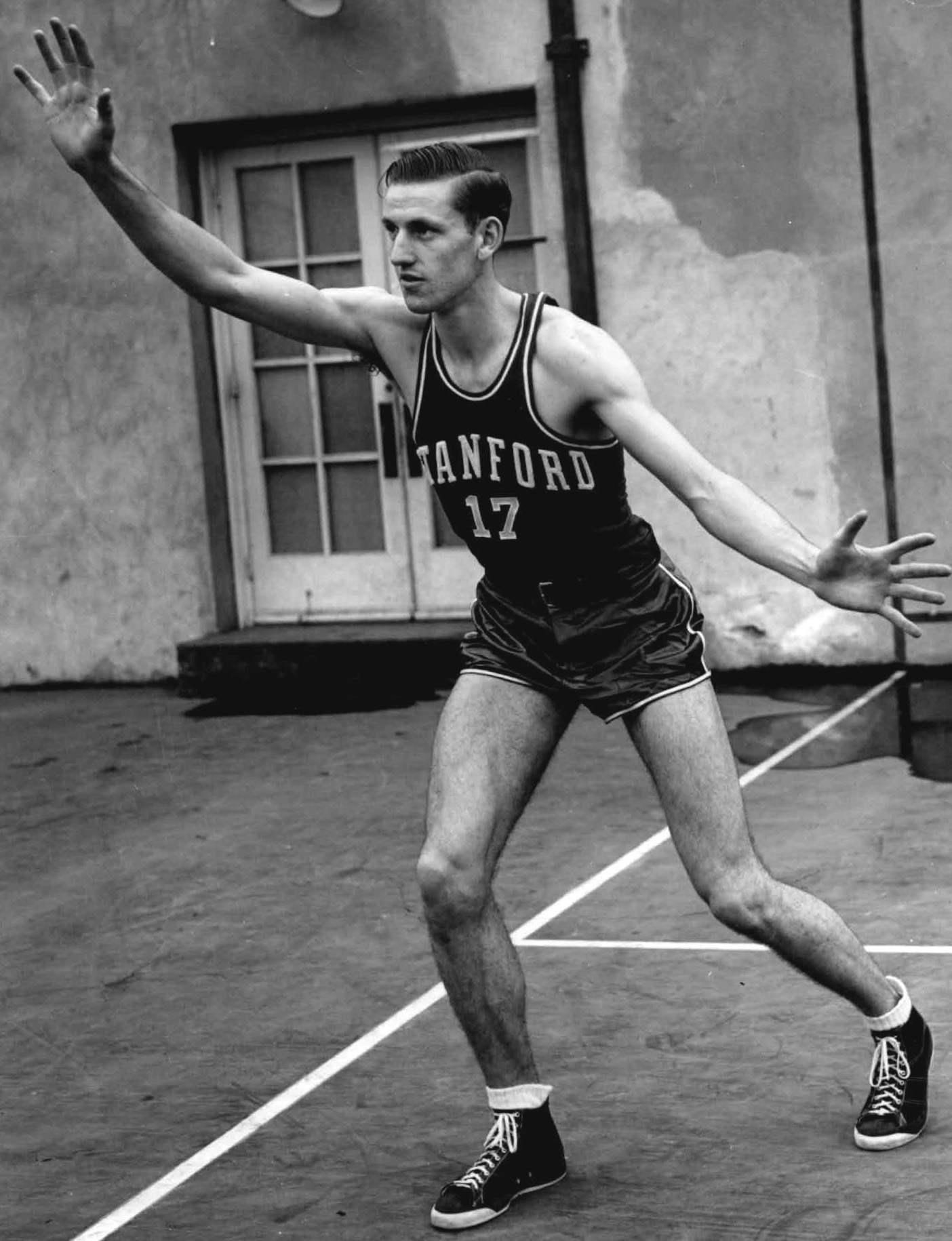
Hall of Famer Jim Pollard was the team's head coach

Miami Floridians Hall of Famers
Coaches
Name	Position	Tenure	Inducted
Jim Pollard ^{1}	Head coach	1968–1969	1978

Notes:

- ^{1} Inducted as a player.

== Season-by-season ==
Playoff berth

Season	League	Division	Finish	W	L	Win%	Playoffs	Awards
Minnesota Muskies
1967–68	ABA	Eastern	2nd	50	28	.641	Won Division Semifinals (Colonels) 3–2; Lost Division Finals (Pipers) 1–4	Mel Daniels (ROY)
Miami Floridians
1968–69	ABA	Eastern	2nd	43	35	.551	Won Division Semifinals (Pipers) 4–3; Lost Division Finals (Pacers) 1–4	—
1969–70	ABA	Eastern	6th	23	61	.274	—	—
The Floridians
1970–71	ABA	Eastern	4th	37	47	.440	Lost Division Semifinals (Colonels) 2–4	—
1971–72	ABA	Eastern	4th	36	48	.429	Lost Division Semifinals (Squires) 0–4	—

Statistic	Wins	Losses	Win%
Regular season record	189	219	.463
Postseason record	11	21	.344
Regular and postseason record	200	240	.455
