= Michael Barrett =

Michael or Mike Barrett may refer to:

== Politicians ==
- Michael J. Barrett (born 1948), American politician in Massachusetts
- Michael Barrett (Irish politician) (1927–2006), Irish Fianna Fáil politician
- Michael Barrett (Canadian politician) (born 1984), Canadian member of parliament from Ontario

== Sportsmen ==
- Mike Barrett (footballer) (1959–1984), English footballer
- Mike Barrett (sportscaster) (born 1968), American sportscaster
- Mike Barrett (basketball) (1943–2011), American basketball player
- Michael Barrett (baseball) (born 1976), American baseball player
- Michael Barrett (American football) (born 1999), American football player

== Others ==
- Michael Barrett (cinematographer) (born 1970), American cinematographer
- Michael Barrett (Fenian) (1841–1868), hanged for his alleged role in the Clerkenwell bombing
- Michael Barrett (physician) (1816–1887), British-Canadian physician and teacher
- Michael Barrett (author) (1924–1999), Australian fiction author of The Invincible Six
- Michael B. Barrett (born c. 1946), U.S. Army general and former assistant professor of history at The Citadel
- Michael R. Barrett (born 1951), American judge
- Michael David Barrett (born 1961), stalker of TV personality Erin Andrews
- Michael Barrett (theologian) (born 1949), American academic dean and professor of Old Testament
- Michael Barrett (parasitologist) (born 1964), professor of biochemical parasitology

== See also ==
- Micheal Barrett (born 1963), sergeant major of the U.S. Marine Corps
- Michael Barret, a character in the Nickelodeon sitcom Zoey 101 played by Christopher Massey
- Michael Barratt (disambiguation)
