= 1971 ABA playoffs =

Postseason tournament

Tournament details
- Dates: April 2 – May 18, 1971
- Season: 1970–71
- Teams: 8

Final positions
- Champions: Utah Stars (1st title)
- Runners-up: Kentucky Colonels
- Semifinalists: Virginia Squires; Indiana Pacers

The 1971 ABA playoffs was the postseason tournament of the American Basketball Association's 1970–71 season. The tournament concluded with the Western Division champion Utah Stars defeating the Eastern Division champion Kentucky Colonels, four games to three in the ABA finals.

== Notable events ==
There was a one-game playoff for fourth place in the Western Division because the Texas Chaparrals and Denver Rockets had tied with regular season records of 30–54. The game was played on April 1 and the Chaparrals won 115–109.

This was the first season in ABA history in which the team with the best regular season record did not win the ABA championship. The Indiana Pacers had the league's best record during this season at 58–26 (.690), putting them one game ahead of the eventual league champion Utah Stars in the Western Division.

This was also the first season in ABA history in which neither regular season division champion made it to the ABA finals. The second place Utah Stars represented the West while the Kentucky Colonels, second place in the East behind the Virginia Squires, met them in the finals.

Game 3 of the Eastern Finals saw 287 total points scored. This was the most points scored in any ABA playoff game, and would be the most points scored in a playoff game in either the NBA or ABA until 1992, when the Portland Trail Blazers and Phoenix Suns combined to score 304 total points in the Western Conference Semifinals that year (albeit with the need of a double-overtime session in mind).

In the Finals, the home team won every game. 13,260 fans attended the decisive Game 7 of the ABA championship series between the Utah Stars and Kentucky Colonels at the Salt Palace in Salt Lake City, Utah on May 18, 1971. After the Stars won 131–121, the fans stormed the floor and mobbed the court for twenty minutes. Willie Wise and Zelmo Beaty rode off the floor carried upon the shoulders of Utah fans.

Zelmo Beaty was named the Most Valuable Player of the ABA Playoffs.

== Bracket ==
Division semifinals
1	Indiana Pacers	4
3	Memphis Pros	0
Western Division
4	Texas Chaparrals	0
2	Utah Stars	4
1	Virginia Squires	4
3	New York Nets	2
Eastern Division
4	The Floridians	2
2	Kentucky Colonels	4

Division finals
1	Indiana Pacers	3
2	Utah Stars	4
1	Virginia Squires	2
2	Kentucky Colonels	4

ABA finals
W2	Utah Stars	4
E2	Kentucky Colonels	3

== Western Division Tiebreaker Game ==
April 1

Box score

Texas Chaparrals 115, Denver Rockets 109
Scoring by quarter: 30–18, 18–32, 31–29, 36–30
Pts: Donnie Freeman 33; Rebs: Gene Moore 16; Asts: Donnie Freeman 6	Pts: Larry Cannon 18; Rebs: Julius Keye 23; Asts: John Barnhill 6
Texas wins tiebreaker

Denver Auditorium Arena, Denver, Colorado
Attendance: 2,594

Both teams won their regular season finales to set up a game for the fourth and final playoff spot in the Western Division; Denver had beaten Texas seven of twelve times in the regular season.

The Chaparrals shot out to an early lead that went to 14 three times in the first quarter, but Denver fought back to lead by two at halftime. In the second half, the Rockets led by 5 at one point before Texas overcame their troubles on the scoring of Donnie Freeman (33) and Gene Moore (28). The two teams battled and were tied multiple times in the final six minutes before Freeman scored a layup with a foul shot to give the Chaparrals a 107–104 lead with 3:32 left that they would never relinquish.

== Division Semifinals ==
=== Western Division Semifinals ===
==== (1) Indiana Pacers vs. (3) Memphis Pros ====
April 2

Boxscore

Memphis Pros 98, Indiana Pacers 114
Scoring by quarter: 24–28, 31–27, 19–30, 24–29
Pts: Jones, Williams 24 each Rebs: Wil Jones 14; Asts: Wil Jones 6	Pts: Roger Brown 26; Rebs: Mel Daniels 18; Asts: Billy Keller 8
Indiana leads series, 1–0

Indiana Farmers Coliseum, Indianapolis, Indiana
Attendance: 7,562

April 3

Boxscore

Memphis Pros 104, Indiana Pacers 106
Scoring by quarter: 25–22, 28–28, 29–25, 22–31
Pts: Steve "Snapper" Jones 31; Rebs: Gerald Govan 20; Asts: Govan, Ladner 6 each	Pts: Mel Daniels 31; Rebs: Mel Daniels 25; Asts: Billy Keller 7
Indiana leads series, 2–0

Indiana Farmers Coliseum, Indianapolis, Indiana
Attendance: 8,701

April 5

Boxscore

Indiana Pacers 91, Memphis Pros 90
Scoring by quarter: 21–24, 23–24, 23–26, 24–16
Pts: Freddie Lewis 23; Rebs: Mel Daniels 19; Asts: Brown, Lewis, Jabali 4 each	Pts: Steve "Snapper" Jones 31; Rebs: Gerald Govan 15; Asts: Govan, W. Jones, J. Jones 5 each
Indiana leads series, 3–0

Mid-South Coliseum, Memphis, Tennessee
Attendance: 4,107

April 7

Boxscore

Indiana Pacers 102, Memphis Pros 101 (OT)
Scoring by quarter: 22–24, 21–33, 27–18, 20–15, Overtime: 12–11
Pts: Mel Daniels 29; Rebs: Mel Daniels 20; Asts: Freddie Lewis 8	Pts: Jimmy Jones 22; Rebs: Jimmy Jones 14; Asts: Gerald Govan 8
Indiana wins series, 4–0

Mid-South Coliseum, Memphis, Tennessee
Attendance: 3,681

==== (2) Utah Stars vs. (4) Texas Chaparrals ====
April 2

Box score

Texas Chaparrals 115, Utah Stars 125
Scoring by quarter: 26–30, 34–36, 33–32, 22–27
Pts: Donnie Freeman 32; Rebs: John Beasley 11	Pts: Mervin Jackson 26; Rebs: Zelmo Beaty 18; Asts: Boone, Jackson 8 each
Utah leads series, 1–0

Salt Palace, Salt Lake City, Utah
Attendance: 4,375

April 3

Box score

Texas Chaparrals 107, Utah Stars 137
Scoring by quarter: 26–36, 28–28, 29–31, 24–42
Pts: Donnie Freeman 23; Rebs: Croft, Moore 9 each	Pts: Glen Combs 25; Rebs: Willie Wise 15
Utah leads series, 2–0

Salt Palace, Salt Lake City, Utah
Attendance: 6,061

April 4

Box score

Utah Stars 113, Texas Chaparrals 101
Scoring by quarter: 22–20, 35–29, 30–30, 26–22
Pts: Zelmo Beaty 32; Rebs: Zelmo Beaty 15	Pts: Donnie Freeman 30; Rebs: Gene Moore 15
Utah leads series, 3–0

Moody Coliseum, University Park, Texas
Attendance: 4,675

April 6

Box score

Utah Stars 128, Texas Chaparrals 107
Scoring by quarter: 27–22, 27–35, 35–23, 39–27
Pts: Ron Boone 23; Rebs: Red Robbins 13	Pts: Levern Tart 31; Rebs: Gene Moore 18
Utah win series, 4–0

Moody Coliseum, University Park, Texas
Attendance: 3,666

=== Eastern Division Semifinals ===
==== (1) Virginia Squires vs. (3) New York Nets ====
April 2

Box score

New York Nets 105, Virginia Squires 113
Scoring by quarter: 26–17, 28–36, 24–28, 27–32
Pts: Rick Barry 32; Rebs: Billy Paultz 16; Asts: Bill Melchionni 12	Pts: Mike Barrett 22; Rebs: Jim Eakins 16; Asts: Charlie Scott 10
Virginia leads series, 1–0

Hampton Coliseum, Hampton, Virginia
Attendance: 6,149

April 4

Box score

New York Nets 108, Virginia Squires 114
Scoring by quarter: 33–31, 28–35, 28–27, 19–21
Pts: Rick Barry 32; Rebs: Billy Paultz 16; Asts: Bill Melchionni 11	Pts: Charlie Scott 29; Rebs: George Carter 14; Asts: Charlie Scott 9
Virginia leads series, 2–0

Hampton Coliseum, Hampton, Virginia
Attendance: 7,143

April 6

Box score

Virginia Squires 131, New York Nets 135
Scoring by quarter: 35–23, 33–45, 31–29, 32–38
Pts: Scott, Barrett 27 each Rebs: Jim Eakins 11; Asts: Mike Barrett 7	Pts: Rick Barry 43; Rebs: Billy Paultz 20; Asts: Bill Melchionni 9
Virginia leads series, 2–1

Hofstra Physical Fitness Center, Hempstead, New York
Attendance: 3,504

Due to Island Garden being booked without expecting the Nets to reach the postseason, the Nets had to play their home playoff games in different locations.

April 7

Box score

Virginia Squires 127, New York Nets 130
Scoring by quarter: 36–34, 37–30, 18–35, 36–31
Pts: George Carter 35; Rebs: Jim Eakins 13; Asts: Doug Moe 6	Pts: Bill Melchionni 35; Rebs: Jim Ard 13; Asts: Bill Melchionni 14
Series tied, 2–2

Hofstra Physical Fitness Center, Hempstead, New York
Attendance: 4,134

April 9

Box score

New York Nets 124, Virginia Squires 127
Scoring by quarter: 30–30, 32–36, 36–34, 26–27
Pts: Rick Barry 36; Rebs: Billy Paultz 15; Asts: Paultz, DePre, Melchionni 5 each	Pts: Mike Barrett 30; Rebs: Carter, Scott 10 each Asts: Mike Barrett 6
Virginia leads series, 3–2

Richmond Arena, Richmond, Virginia
Attendance: 4,250

April 10

Box score

Virginia Squires 118, New York Nets 114
Scoring by quarter: 34–35, 30–27, 24–27, 30–25
Pts: Charlie Scott 38; Rebs: Johnson, Carter 9 each Asts: Charlie Scott 6	Pts: Rick Barry 45; Rebs: Rick Barry 17; Asts: Jeff Congdon 7
Virginia wins series, 4–2

Felt Forum, New York City, New York
Attendance: 3,016

==== (2) Kentucky Colonels vs. (4) The Floridians ====
April 2

Box score

The Floridians 112, Kentucky Colonels 116
Scoring by quarter: 28–25, 24–33, 32–25, 28–33
Pts: Larry Jones 25; Rebs: Ira Harge 12; Asts: Warren Davis 9	Pts: Dan Issel 26; Rebs: Jim Ligon 16; Asts: Louie Dampier 11
Kentucky leads series, 1–0

Freedom Hall, Louisville, Kentucky
Attendance: 3,182

April 4

Box score

The Floridians 110, Kentucky Colonels 120
Scoring by quarter: 31–33, 24–28, 23–29, 32–30
Pts: Mack Calvin 35; Rebs: Ira Harge 19	Pts: Louie Dampier 28; Rebs: Jim Ligon 15; Asts: Louie Dampier 8
Kentucky leads series, 2–0

Freedom Hall, Louisville, Kentucky
Attendance: 3,881

April 6

Box score

Kentucky Colonels 102, The Floridians 120
Scoring by quarter: 26–33, 26–31, 24–30, 26–26
Pts: Les Hunter 21; Rebs: Dan Issel 16	Pts: Mack Calvin 24; Rebs: Ira Harge 18; Asts: Mack Calvin 12
Kentucky leads series, 2–1

Miami-Dade Junior College North, Miami, Florida
Attendance: 4,126

April 8

Box score

Kentucky Colonels 117, The Floridians 129
Scoring by quarter: 28–31, 22–30, 36–38, 31–30
Pts: Cincy Powell 31; Rebs: Jim Ligon 18	Pts: Mack Calvin 34; Rebs: Ira Harge 20; Asts: Mack Calvin 10
Series tied, 2–2

Miami-Dade Junior College North, Miami, Florida
Attendance: 4,268

April 10

Box score

The Floridians 101, Kentucky Colonels 118
Scoring by quarter: 27–32, 17–17, 31–33, 26–36
Pts: Mack Calvin 29; Rebs: Ira Harge 10	Pts: Darel Carrier 31; Rebs: Jim Ligon 14; Asts: Louie Dampier 18
Kentucky leads series, 3–2

Freedom Hall, Louisville, Kentucky
Attendance: 4,996

April 12

Box score

Kentucky Colonels 112, The Floridians 103
Scoring by quarter: 28–22, 29–31, 33–20, 22–30
Pts: Dan Issel 27; Rebs: Jim Ligon 20	Pts: Calvin, Davis, Tucker 18 each Rebs: Ira Harge 19
Kentucky wins series, 4–2

Miami-Dade Junior College North, Miami, Florida
Attendance: 4,478

== Division Finals ==
=== Western Division Finals ===
==== (1) Indiana Pacers vs. (2) Utah Stars ====
April 12

Box score

Utah Stars 120, Indiana Pacers 118
Scoring by quarter: 31–38, 34–31, 30–26, 25–23
Pts: Mervin Jackson 28; Rebs: Zelmo Beaty 15; Asts: Willie Wise 9	Pts: Mel Daniels 27; Rebs: Mel Daniels 15; Asts: Brown, Lewis 7 each
Utah leads series, 1–0

Indiana State Fair Coliseum, Indianapolis, Indiana
Attendance: 7,734

April 14

Box score

Utah Stars 107, Indiana Pacers 120
Scoring by quarter: 40–33, 17–25, 24–33, 26–29
Pts: Mervin Jackson 27; Rebs: Beaty, Robbins 12 each Asts: Ron Boone 5	Pts: Billy Keller 31; Rebs: Mel Daniels 20; Asts: Brown, Jabali, Lewis 6 each
Series tied, 1–1

Indiana State Fair Coliseum, Indianapolis, Indiana
Attendance: 9,458

April 17

Box score

Indiana Pacers 108, Utah Stars 121
Scoring by quarter: 22–33, 28–32, 31–28, 27–28
Pts: Roger Brown 23; Rebs: Mel Daniels 20; Asts: Billy Keller 10	Pts: Ron Boone 27; Rebs: Zelmo Beaty 14; Asts: Ron Boone 11
Utah leads series, 2–1

Salt Palace, Salt Lake City, Utah
Attendance: 12,711

April 20

Box score

Indiana Pacers 99, Utah Stars 126
Scoring by quarter: 13–33, 23–20, 22–37, 41–36
Pts: Billy Keller 20; Rebs: Mel Daniels 16; Asts: Jabali, Mount 4 each	Pts: Zelmo Beaty 22; Rebs: Zelmo Beaty 13; Asts: Mervin Jackson 12
Utah leads series, 3–1

Salt Palace, Salt Lake City, Utah
Attendance: 12,761

April 22

Box score

Utah Stars 109, Indiana Pacers 127
Scoring by quarter: 30–28, 19–39, 26–26, 34–34
Pts: Willie Wise 21; Rebs: Red Robbins 14; Asts: Willie Wise 8	Pts: Bob Netolicky 29; Rebs: Mel Daniels 27; Asts: Billy Keller 9
Utah leads series, 3–2

Anderson High School Wigwam, Anderson, Indiana
Attendance: 8,279

April 24

Box score

Indiana Pacers 105, Utah Stars 102
Scoring by quarter: 26–20, 20–28, 30–21, 29–33
Pts: Billy Keller 28; Rebs: Mel Daniels 15; Asts: Billy Keller 6	Pts: Zelmo Beaty 32; Rebs: Zelmo Beaty 20; Asts: Ron Boone 8
Series tied, 3–3

Salt Palace, Salt Lake City, Utah
Attendance: 13,208

April 28

Box score

Utah Stars 108, Indiana Pacers 101
Scoring by quarter: 27–27, 17–24, 41–23, 23–27
Pts: Willie Wise 31; Rebs: Red Robbins 14; Asts: Mervin Jackson 10	Pts: Billy Keller 33; Rebs: Mel Daniels 17; Asts: Roger Brown 5
Utah wins series, 4–3

Indiana State Fair Coliseum, Indianapolis, Indiana
Attendance: 11,202

=== Eastern Division Finals ===
==== (1) Virginia Squires vs. (2) Kentucky Colonels ====
April 15

Box score

Kentucky Colonels 136, Virginia Squires 132
Scoring by quarter: 31–23, 36–41, 39–33, 30–35
Pts: Dan Issel 46; Rebs: Cincy Powell 18; Asts: Louie Dampier 6	Pts: Charlie Scott 35; Rebs: George Carter 16; Asts: Charlie Scott 7
Kentucky leads series, 1–0

Richmond Arena, Richmond, Virginia
Attendance: 4,250

Issel scored 46 points, which was the most for a player in any game of the 1971 postseason, as the Colonels withstood a narrow second hand to win Game 1.

April 17

Box score

Kentucky Colonels 122, Virginia Squires 142
Scoring by quarter: 32–32, 26–42, 28–37, 36–31
Pts: Dan Issel 32; Rebs: Dan Issel 10; Asts: Louie Dampier 7	Pts: Scott, Moe 28 each Rebs: Charlie Scott 9 Asts: Scott, Eakins 9 each
Series tied, 1–1

Old Dominion University Fieldhouse, Norfolk, Virginia
Attendance: 5,000

April 19

Box score

Virginia Squires 150, Kentucky Colonels 137
Scoring by quarter: 34–35, 36–41, 39–30, 41–31
Pts: C. Scott, R. Scott 30 each Rebs: Neil Johnson 11; Asts: Charlie Scott 13	Pts: Dan Issel 27; Rebs: Cincy Powell 27; Asts: Louie Dampier 9
Virginia leads series, 2–1

Freedom Hall, Louisville, Kentucky
Attendance: 4,777

April 21

Box score

Virginia Squires 110, Kentucky Colonels 128
Scoring by quarter: 35–34, 25–29, 24–35, 26–30
Pts: Charlie Scott 30; Rebs: Neil Johnson 14; Asts: Fatty Taylor 4	Pts: Dan Issel 31; Rebs: Jim Ligon 17; Asts: Louie Dampier 11
Series tied, 2–2

Freedom Hall, Louisville, Kentucky
Attendance: 5,221

April 23

Box score

Kentucky Colonels 117, Virginia Squires 105
Scoring by quarter: 28–27, 38–26, 19–27, 30–27
Pts: Dan Issel 36; Rebs: Dan Issel 21; Asts: Louie Dampier 7	Pts: Doug Moe 29; Rebs: Neil Johnson 15; Asts: Scott, Barrett 7 each
Kentucky leads series, 3–2

Hampton Coliseum, Hampton, Virginia
Attendance: 10,013

April 24

Box score

Virginia Squires 117, Kentucky Colonels 129
Scoring by quarter: 28–29, 28–36, 32–26, 29–38
Pts: Carter, Moe 25 each Rebs: George Carter13; Asts: Charlie Scott 6	Pts: Dan Issel 31; Rebs: Jim Ligon 20; Asts: Louie Dampier 17
Kentucky wins series, 4–2

Freedom Hall, Louisville, Kentucky
Attendance: 12,822

== ABA Finals: (W2) Utah Stars vs. (E2) Kentucky Colonels ==
May 3

Box score

Kentucky Colonels 117, Utah Stars 136
Scoring by quarter: 35–26, 25–50, 33–25, 24–35
Pts: Darel Carrier 36; Rebs: Cincy Powell 11; Asts: Jim Ligon 6	Pts: Beaty, Stone 26 each Rebs: Zelmo Beaty 16; Asts: Mervin Jackson 9
Utah leads series, 1–0

Salt Palace, Salt Lake City, Utah
Attendance: 12,051

Kentucky started the game with a rapid attack led by Dan Issel that had him score 17 points in the first 12 minutes as the Colonels led 32–19 at one point in the first quarter. Stars coach Bill Sharman decided to send in reserve George Stone into the game along with later sending in Ron Boone to get outside shooting strength that saw the two combined for 37 points as the Stars led by 16 at halftime. The Stars continued to roll with a defense and tough rebounding effort (outdoing them 59–56) as Zelmo Beaty and Stone led the Stars in scoring with 26 each. The 50 points scored in the second quarter set a league record for a playoff game.

May 5

Box score

Kentucky Colonels 125, Utah Stars 138
Scoring by quarter: 28–37, 34–28, 29–32, 34–41
Pts: Dan Issel 40; Rebs: Dan Issel 11; Asts: Dampier, Hunter 6 each	Pts: Zelmo Beaty 40; Rebs: Willie Wise 24; Asts: Wise, Jackson 8 ach
Utah leads series, 2–0

Salt Palace, Salt Lake City, Utah
Attendance: 13,208

In a game where both teams had a leading scorer with 40 points (Zelmo Beaty, Dan Issel), the Stars pulled a 2–0 series lead. Beaty went 18-of-23 while his teammate Willie Wise scored 26 points on 9-of-17 shooting with eight free throws to go with 24 rebounds and eight assists. Utah pulled away in the second quarter, never trailing after halftime; Utah shot 57 percent from the line while Kentucky could only muster 48 percent.

May 7

Box score

Utah Stars 110, Kentucky Colonels 116
Scoring by quarter: 27–30, 28–25, 26–28, 29–33
Pts: Willie Wise 29; Rebs: Willie Wise 17; Asts: Willie Wise 5	Pts: Darel Carrier 25; Rebs: Issel, Powell, Ligon 17 each Asts: Louie Dampier 11
Utah leads series, 2–1

Freedom Hall, Louisville, Kentucky
Attendance: 12,337

Wracked with injuries to Merv Jackson (tendonitis) and Red Robbins (intestinal flu), the Stars were trounced by the Colonels in a game where Zelmo Beaty ran into foul trouble early as the trio of Cincy Powell, Dan Issel and Jim Ligon dominated on the boards with 17 rebounds each; the Colonels outrebounded the Stars (69–57), particularly on the offensive side (23–14).

May 8

Box score

Utah Stars 125, Kentucky Colonels 129 (OT)
Scoring by quarter: 24–35, 30–32, 31–30, 34–22, Overtime: 6–10
Pts: Willie Wise 34; Rebs: Willie Wise 17; Asts: Ron Boone 8	Pts: Louie Dampier 33; Rebs: Jim Ligon 17; Asts: Darel Carrier 6
Series tied, 2–2

Freedom Hall, Louisville, Kentucky
Attendance: 9,863

The Colonels ran off into a 13-point lead at halftime after the Stars shot miserably, but Utah (still with a sore Jackson and sickened Robbins) managed to narrow it down to single digits with time expiring. Zelmo Beaty fouled out with less than five minutes remaining, while Robbins missed foul shots and a jumper that would've given Utah a late lead as the two teams went into overtime. The Colonels took control from there, with Carrier and Louie Dampier scoring and playing defense that saw them outscore Utah 10–6 to tie the series. Utah shot 41.8 percent from the field while Kentucky shot 45.9%. Willie Wise had 34 points to lead Utah while Dampier had 33.

May 12

Box score

Kentucky Colonels 127, Utah Stars 137
Scoring by quarter: 25–34, 31–41, 32–29, 39–33
Pts: Dan Issel 33; Rebs: Issel, Powell 16 each Asts: Louie Dampier 11	Pts: Zelmo Beaty 32; Rebs: Zelmo Beaty 22; Asts: Glen Combs 8
Utah lead series 3–2

Salt Palace, Salt Lake City, Utah
Attendance: 13,250
Referees: Joe Gushue, John Vanak

Utah rode a first half where they led by 19 on 53 percent shooting to coast to victory, with Zelmo Beaty scoring 32 on 11-of-21 from the field (with 10 free throws) while getting 22 rebounds and five assists. A skirmish broke out in the third quarter when Willie Wise and Cincy Powell tangled that saw both benches empty before Ron Boone managed to "bop" Powell; Boone received a technical and Powell received a personal foul as the game moved forward.

May 15

Box score

Utah Stars 102, Kentucky Colonels 105
Scoring by quarter: 24–31, 25–27, 34–23, 19–24
Pts: Willie Wise 34; Rebs: Zelmo Beaty 16; Asts: Mervin Jackson 4	Pts: Cincy Powell 31; Rebs: Cincy Powell 17; Asts: Louie Dampier 10
Series tied, 3–3

Freedom Hall, Louisville, Kentucky
Attendance: 11,793

Cincy Powell openly had stated he would "get Ron Boone" in the days leading up to Game 6. As it turned out, Powell would impact the game by leading the Colonels in scoring with 31 points on 14-of-23 shooting (with three free throws) while getting 17 rebounds as the home team once again won in the Finals. Utah shot barely over 40% from the field (while missing all nine three-point attempts) and were outrebounded as late fouls plagued them; the trio of Ron Boone, Merv Jackson and Glen Combs combined for just 20. Within two hours of the box office being opened at Salt Palace for a Game 7, every ticket had been purchased.

May 18

Box score

Kentucky Colonels 127, Utah Stars 131
Scoring by quarter: 32–28, 22–33, 36–37, 31–33
Pts: Dan Issel 41; Rebs: Cincy Powell 20; Asts: Louie Dampier 14	Pts: Zelmo Beaty 36; Rebs: Willie Wise 20; Asts: Mervin Jackson 7
Utah wins series 4–3

Salt Palace, Salt Lake City, Utah
Attendance: 13,260

A sellout crowd of 13,260 watched the game despite the game being broadcast locally in Utah. The Stars scored 10 of the first eleven points in the game, but Kentucky soon got hot and led by the end of the first quarter. Their biggest lead of the night was a seven-point lead early in the second quarter, but the Stars and Colonels both would trade the lead before Glen Combs gave the Stars a 41–40 lead. The Stars never trailed after the shot. Darel Carrier had 31 points for Kentucky, with three straight three-pointers near the end of the third quarter to help narrow the deficit. With 4:29 to go, Kentucky was down by just four after being down by as much as 14, but Willie Wise scored a layup with a made free throw to go along with Zelmo Beaty making a layup to give Utah a nine-point lead in just over a minute of play. The tough defense by Utah limited Kentucky to just 39 percent shooting while Beaty outrebounded Dan Issel in the battle of centers (16–12) to counteract the 41 points scored by Issel.

Celebration spilled out of the 10,000-seat Salt Palace (where the fans actually swarmed the court) and into the streets of the state capital for jubilant Stars fans. It was the first professional sports championship for the state of Utah and the only one until MLS Cup 2009 by Real Salt Lake; it is still the only professional basketball championship in the state of Utah.

Two members of the Stars would eventually be inducted into the Naismith Basketball Hall of Fame: Zelmo Beaty (2016) and head coach Bill Sharman (2004). This was the last game coached by Sharman with the Stars, as he elected to resign to coach the Los Angeles Lakers. He was replaced by LaDell Andersen. On June 20, Frank Ramsey (who had taken over for Gene Rhodes in the middle of the season as head coach) was fired by the Colonels and replaced by former Los Angeles Lakers head coach Joe Mullaney.

== Statistical leaders ==
Category	Total			Average			
Category	Player	Team	Total	Player	Team	Avg.	Games played
Points	Dan Issel	Kentucky Colonels	534	Rick Barry	New York Nets	33.7	6
Rebounds	Zelmo Beaty	Utah Stars	263	Mel Daniels	Indiana Pacers	19.2	11
Assists	Louie Dampier	Kentucky Colonels	179	Louie Dampier	Kentucky Colonels	9.4	19

=== Total leaders ===
Points

1. Dan Issel - 534
2. Zelmo Beaty - 418
3. Darel Carrier - 369
4. Willie Wise - 359
5. Cincy Powell - 350

Rebounds

1. Zelmo Beaty - 263
2. Cincy Powell - 248
3. Dan Issel - 221
4. Willie Wise - 220
5. Jim Ligon - 219

Assists

1. Louie Dampier - 179
2. Mervin Jackson - 109
3. Ron Boone - 94
4. Willie Wise - 82
5. Charlie Scott - 82

Minutes

1. Louie Dampier - 828
2. Cincy Powell - 702
3. Zelmo Beaty - 698
4. Willie Wise - 691
5. Darel Carrier - 675
