= List of American Basketball Association awards and honors =

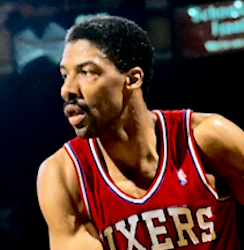
Hall of Famer Julius Erving was a three-time ABA MVP, two-time ABA Playoffs MVP, and four-time All-ABA First Team.

The American Basketball Association (ABA) was a professional basketball league that operated from the 1967–68 season until it ceased to exist with the ABA–NBA merger in 1976. The ABA presented a variety of annual awards and honors to recognize its players and executives.

There were six awards presented by the ABA. Three Most Valuable Player (MVP) awards were presented annually in the All-Star Game, the regular season, and the playoffs. In sports, the player judged to be the most important to the team is the Most Valuable Player (MVP). Other annual awards include the Executive of the Year, the Coach of the Year, and the Rookie of the Year. Honors were also presented to players who excelled in the respective categories of: best players, best defensive players, and best rookies. The Executive of the Year Award and the All-Defensive Team started in the 1972–73 season, while the rest started in the first season. Julius Erving has won the most ABA awards with five MVP awards—three in the regular season and two in the playoffs. Artis Gilmore has won the most ABA honors with nine. A total of 80 ABA players and executives have received at least one award or honor.

== ABA championship ==
The American Basketball Association (ABA) Finals were the championship series of the ABA, a professional basketball league, in which two teams played each other for the title. The ABA was formed in the fall of 1967, and the first ABA Finals were played at the end of the league's first season in the spring of 1968. The league ceased operations in 1976 with the ABA–NBA merger and four teams from the ABA continued play in the National Basketball Association.

All ABA Finals were in best-of-seven format and were contested between the winners of the Eastern Division and the Western Division finals. The only teams to win the championship more than once were the Indiana Pacers and the New York Nets. The Indiana Pacers initially played in the ABA Finals in 1969, which they lost to the Oakland Oaks, but they won the championship the next year against the Los Angeles Stars. They won in the ABA Finals again in 1972, their first after moving to the Western Division, against the New York Nets and won their final ABA championship against the Kentucky Colonels in 1973. The New York Nets won their first championship in 1974 against the Utah Stars, and their second against the Denver Nuggets in 1976.

The last ABA Finals were in 1976, after which the ABA–NBA merger took place;all four teams that continued into the NBA made it to or won the ABA Finals.

== Awards ==
*	Elected to the Naismith Memorial Basketball Hall of Fame
Player (X)	Denotes the number of times the player has received the respective award

=== Most Valuable Player ===
The Most Valuable Player (MVP) was an annual award first awarded in the 1967–68 season. Every player who has won the award has played for a team with at least 45 regular-season wins. The inaugural award winner was Hall of Famer Connie Hawkins. Hall of Famer Julius Erving won the award three times, all with the New York Nets. Mel Daniels won it twice with the Indiana Pacers. Erving and George McGinnis were joint winners in the 1974–75 season. Seven of the award winners were capable of playing forward, while six were capable of playing center. Two rookies have won the award: Spencer Haywood in the 1969–70 season and Artis Gilmore in the 1971–72 season. With the announcement of McGinnis as a member of the Naismith Memorial Basketball Hall of Fame class of 2017, every ABA MVP has been inducted into the Hall of Fame.

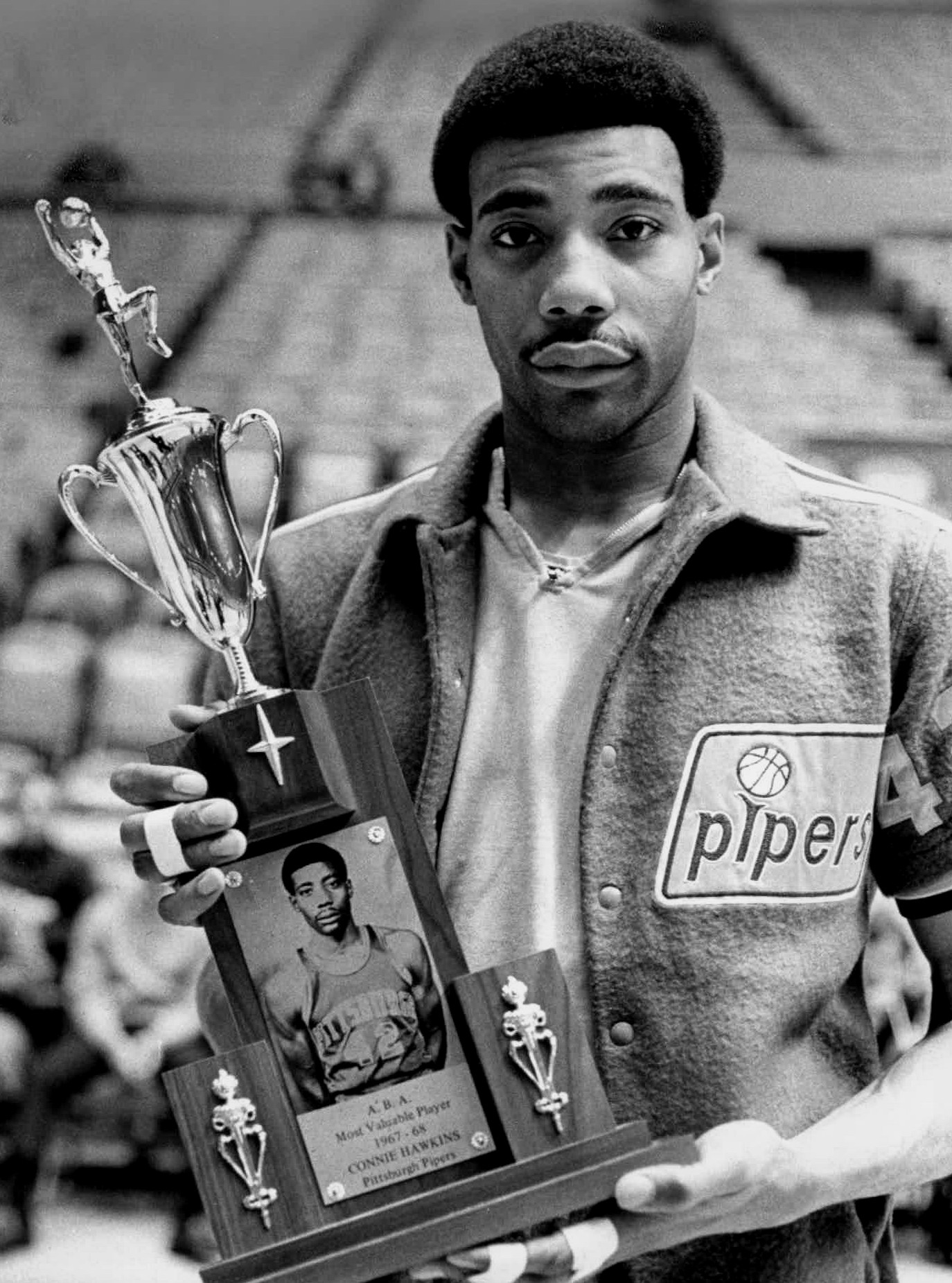
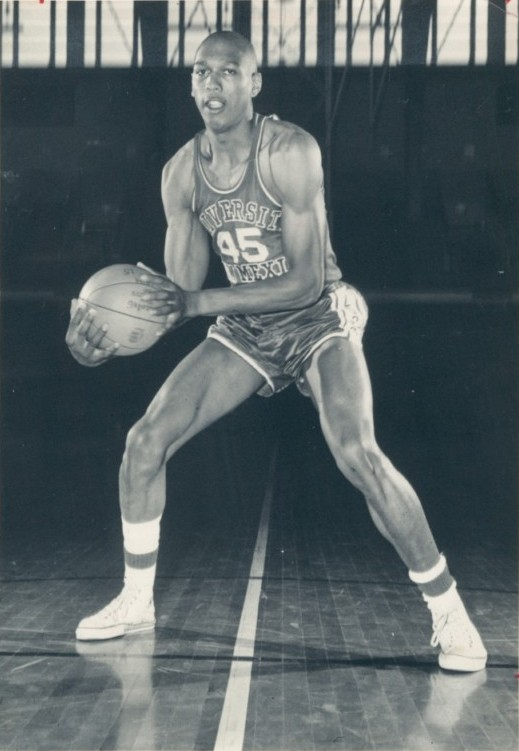
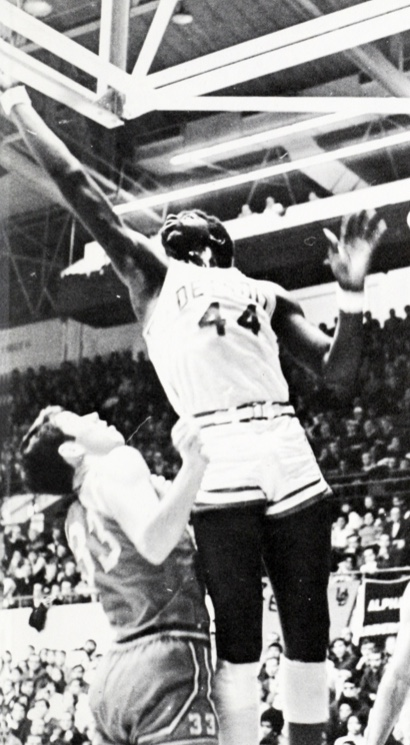
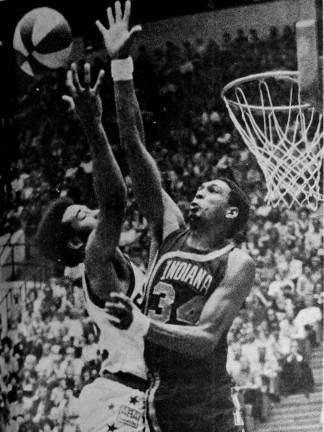
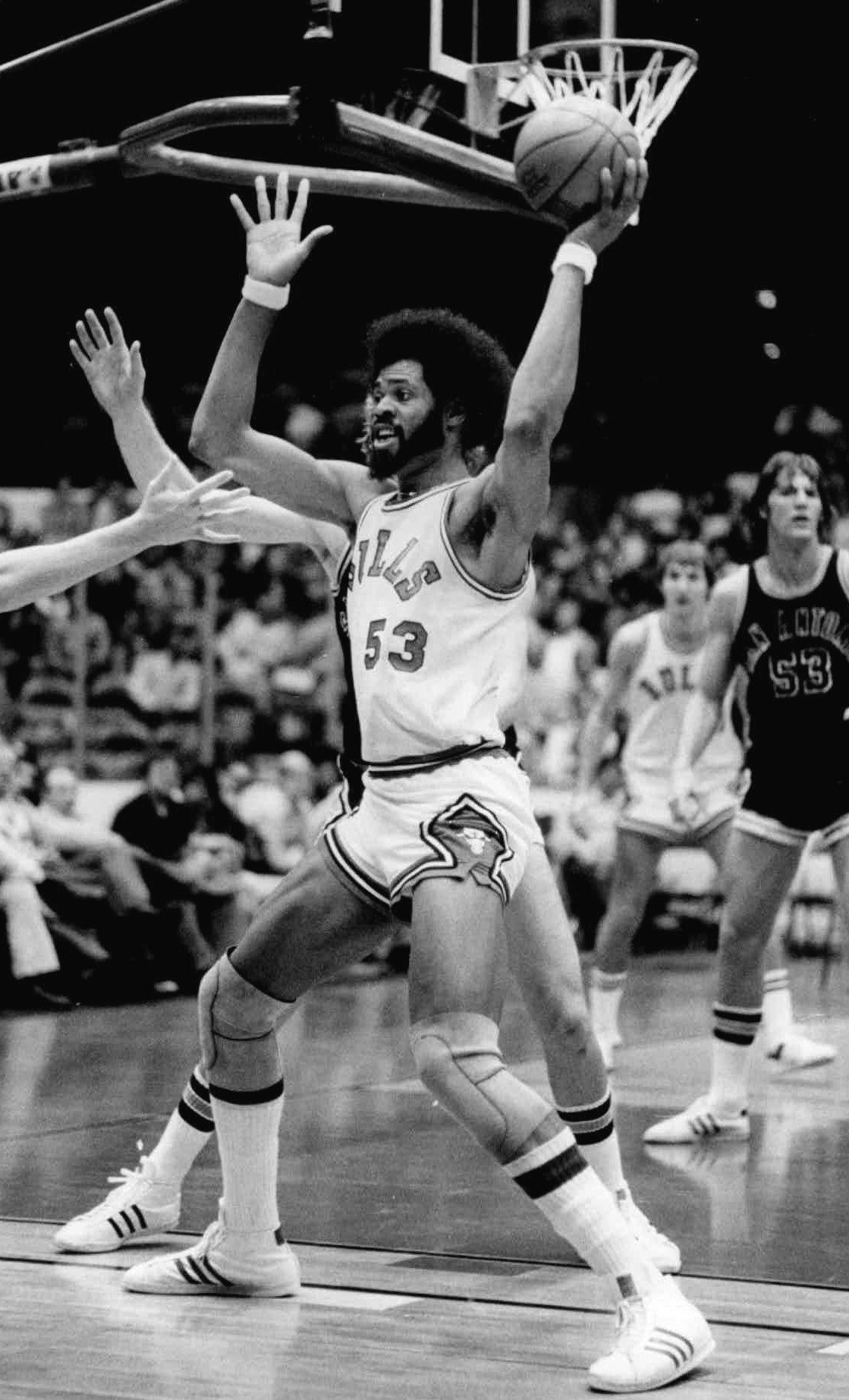
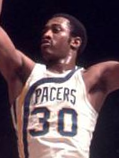
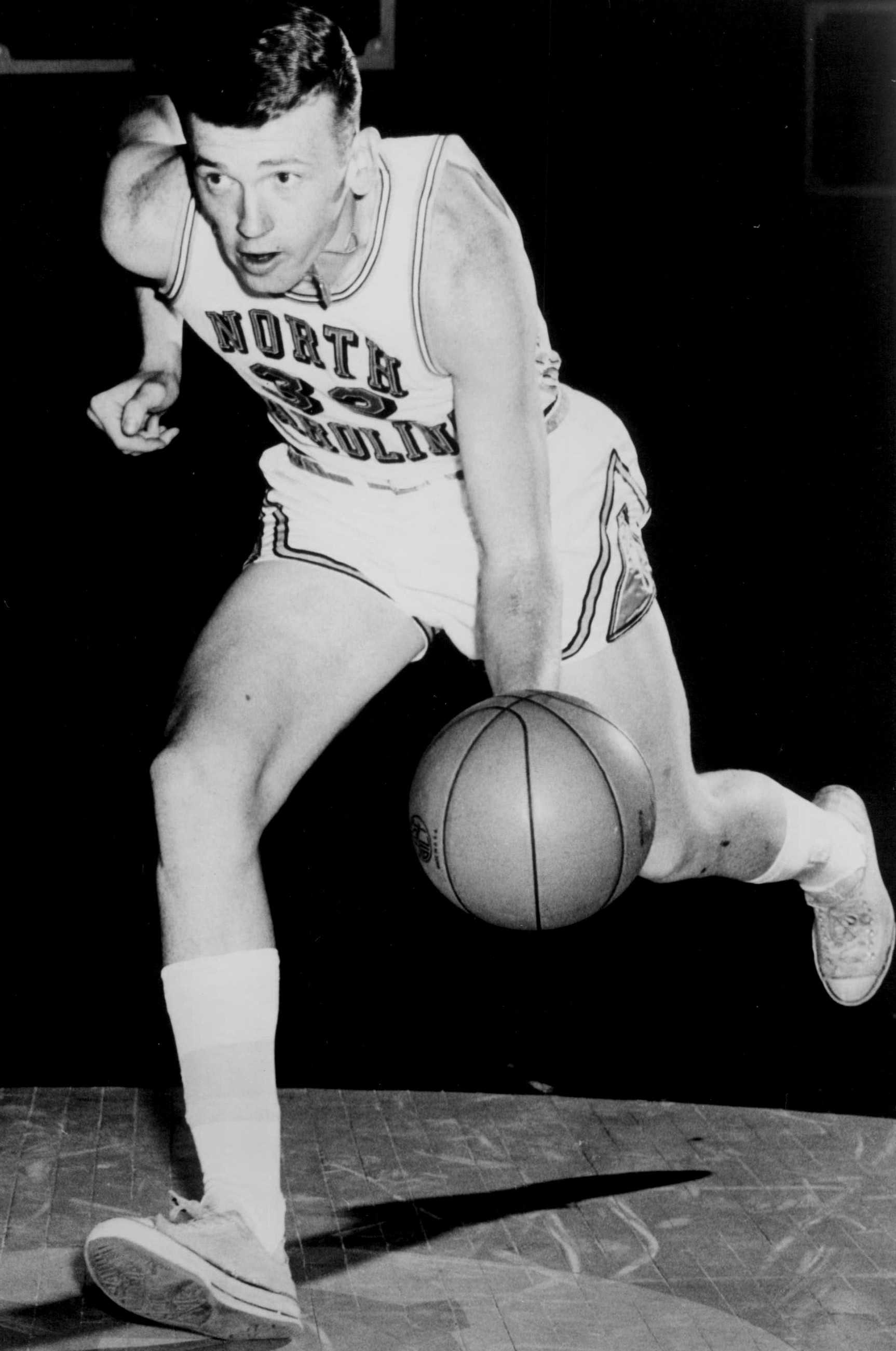
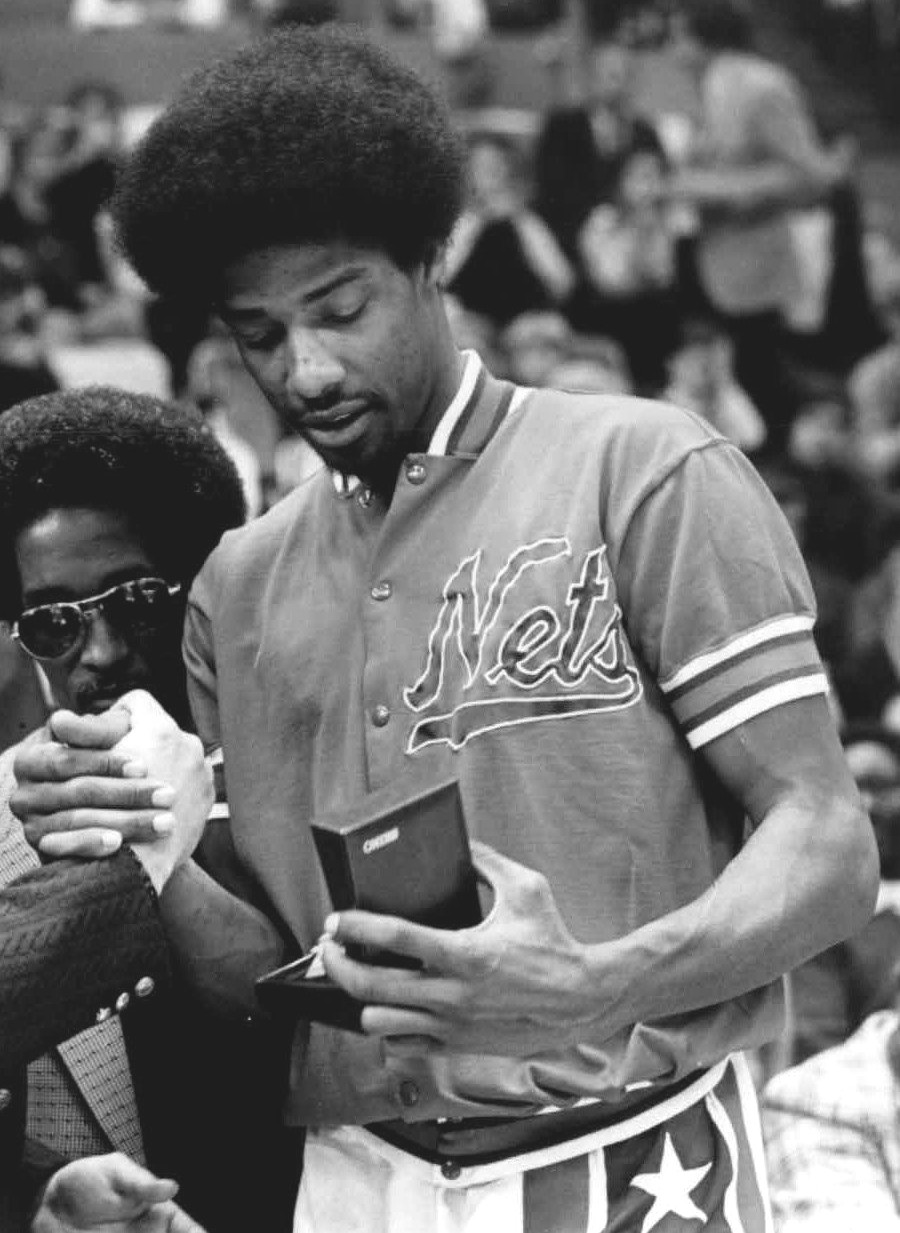
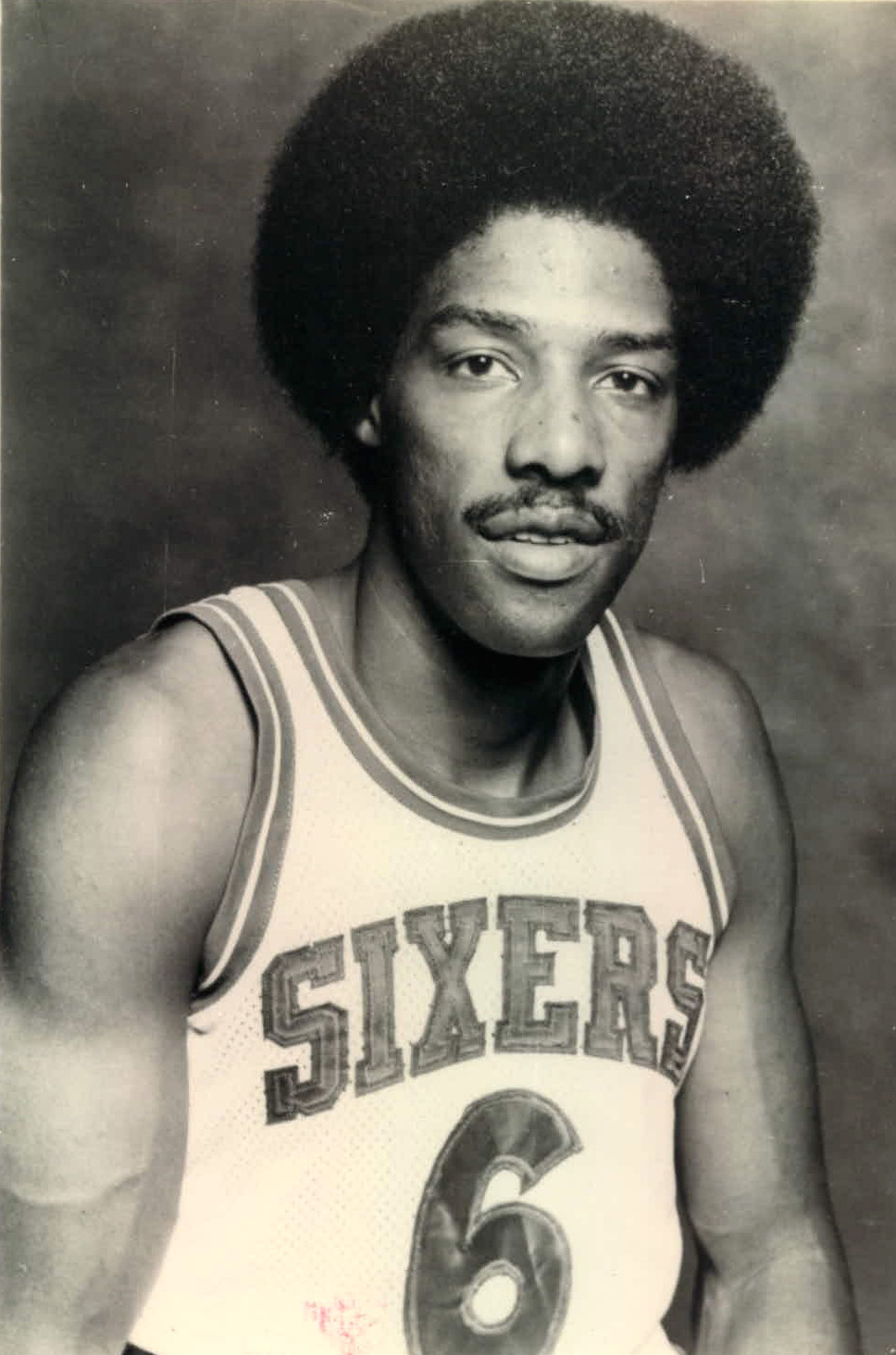

Season	Player	Position	Team
1967–68	Connie Hawkins*	F/C	Pittsburgh Pipers
1968–69	Mel Daniels*	C	Indiana Pacers
1969–70	Spencer Haywood*	F/C	Denver Rockets
1970–71	Mel Daniels* (2)	C	Indiana Pacers
1971–72	Artis Gilmore*	C	Kentucky Colonels
1972–73	Billy Cunningham*	G/F	Carolina Cougars
1973–74	Julius Erving*	F	New York Nets
1974–75^{[a]}	Julius Erving* (2)	F	New York Nets
1974–75^{[a]}	George McGinnis*	F/C	Indiana Pacers
1975–76	Julius Erving* (3)	F	New York Nets

=== Rookie of the Year ===
The Rookie of the Year Award was an annual award first awarded in the 1967–68 season, to the top rookie(s) of the regular season. The inaugural award winner was Mel Daniels, who also won two MVP awards during his ABA career. Two of the Rookie of the Year winners have won the MVP award in the same season: Spencer Haywood in the 1969–70 season and Artis Gilmore in the 1971–72 season. Two Rookie of the Year winners have been elected to the Naismith Memorial Basketball Hall of Fame: 1970–71 Rookie of the Year Dan Issel and 1975–76 Rookie of the Year David Thompson. Issel and Charlie Scott were joint winners in the 1970–71 season.

Season	Player	Position	Team
1967–68	Mel Daniels*	C	Minnesota Muskies
1968–69	Warren Jabali	G/F	Oakland Oaks
1969–70	Spencer Haywood*	F/C	Denver Rockets
1970–71^{[a]}	Charlie Scott*	G/F	Virginia Squires
1970–71^{[a]}	Dan Issel*	C/F	Kentucky Colonels
1971–72	Artis Gilmore*	C	Kentucky Colonels
1972–73	Brian Taylor	G	New York Nets
1973–74	Swen Nater	C	San Antonio Spurs
1974–75	Marvin Barnes	F/C	Spirits of St. Louis
1975–76	David Thompson*	G/F	Denver Nuggets

=== Coach of the Year ===
The Coach of the Year was an annual award first awarded in the 1967–68 season, to the best head coach(es) of the regular season. The inaugural award winner was Vince Cazzetta, who coached the Pittsburgh Pipers to an ABA championship. Oakland Oaks coach Alex Hannum won the award the season after, and also coached his team to an ABA championship. Larry Brown won the award three times, and is the only coach to have won the award multiple times. Two seasons had joint winners—Joe Belmont and Bill Sharman in the 1969–70 season as well as Joe Mullaney and Babe McCarthy in the 1973–74 season. Hannum, Sharman and Brown are the only recipients to have been inducted to the Naismith Memorial Basketball Hall of Fame. Every head coach won the award without a losing record.

Win%	Winning percentage
Division	Regular season finish in division

Season	Coach	Team	Win–loss	Win%	Division
1967–68	Vince Cazzetta	Pittsburgh Pipers	54–24	.692	1st (Eastern)
1968–69	Alex Hannum*	Oakland Oaks	60–18	.769	1st (Western)
1969–70^{[a]}	Bill Sharman*	Los Angeles Stars	43–41	.512	4th (Western)
1969–70^{[a]}	Joe Belmont	Denver Rockets	42–14	.750	1st (Western)
1970–71	Al Bianchi	Virginia Squires	55–29	.655	1st (Eastern)
1971–72	Tom Nissalke	Dallas Chaparrals	42–42	.500	3rd (Western)
1972–73	Larry Brown*	Carolina Cougars	57–27	.679	1st (Eastern)
1973–74^{[a]}	Babe McCarthy	Kentucky Colonels	53–31	.631	2nd (Eastern)
1973–74^{[a]}	Joe Mullaney	Utah Stars	51–33	.607	1st (Western)
1974–75	Larry Brown* (2)	Denver Nuggets	65–19	.774	1st (Western)
1975–76	Larry Brown* (3)	Denver Nuggets	60–24	.714	None

=== Playoffs MVP ===
The Playoffs Most Valuable Player Award was an annual award given in the ABA Playoffs. The award was first awarded in the 1968 ABA Playoffs, and was retired as part of the ABA–NBA merger. The inaugural award winner was Pittsburgh Pipers' player Connie Hawkins. On all occasions, the player who won the Playoffs MVP award was from the team that won the ABA championship. Julius Erving, who led the New York Nets to two ABA championships in 1974 and 1976, is the only player to win the award twice.

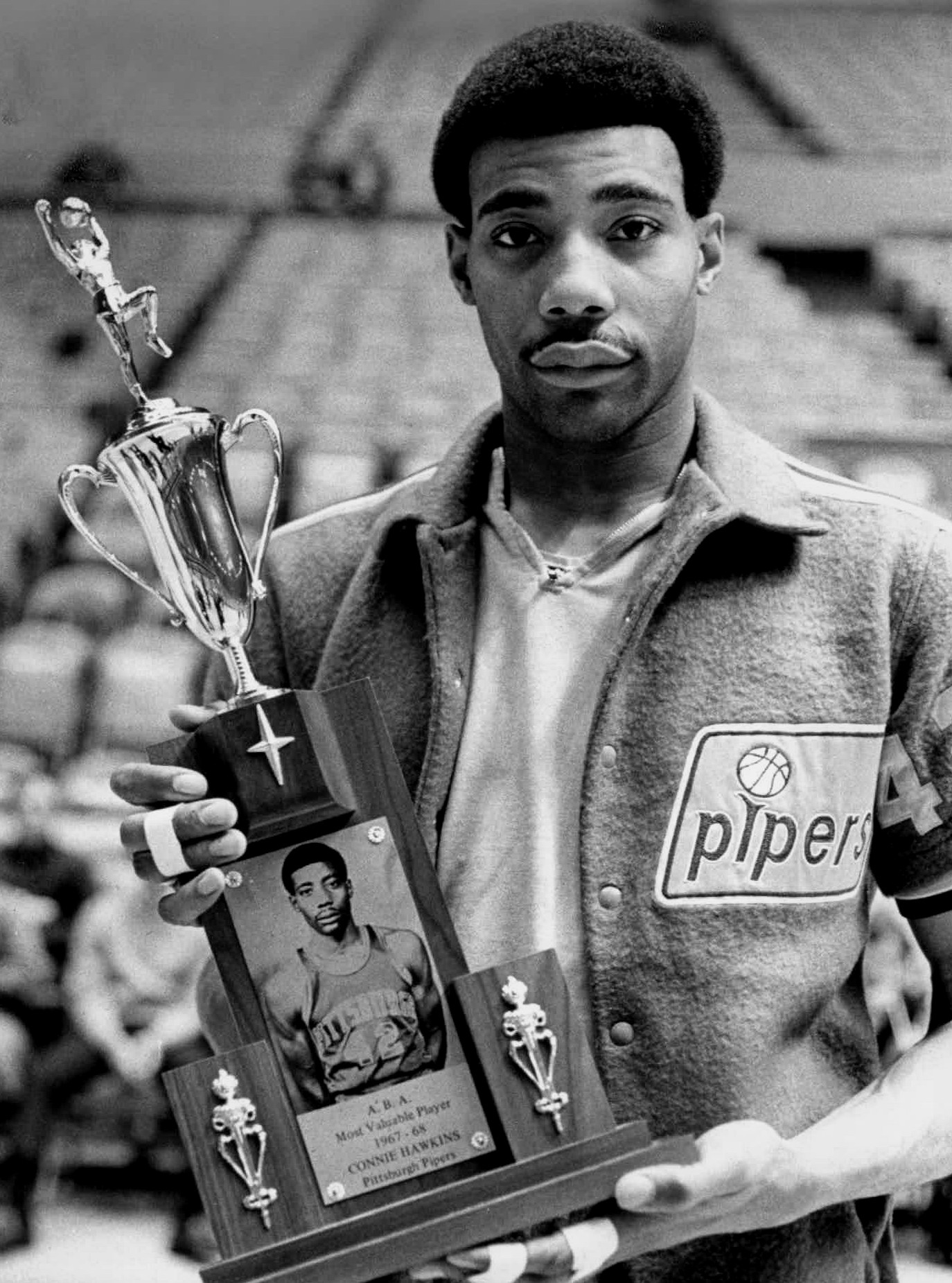
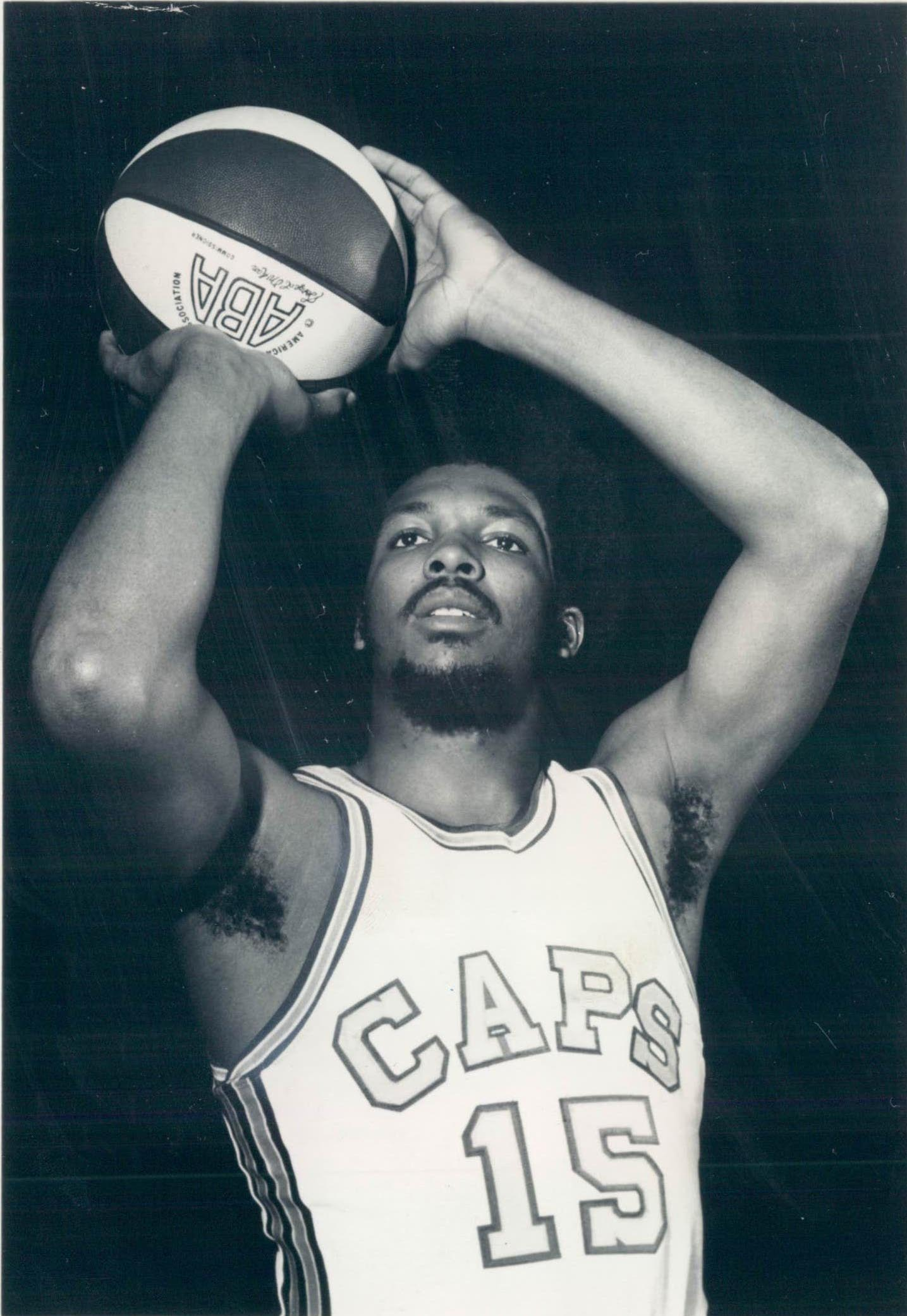
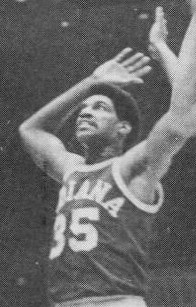
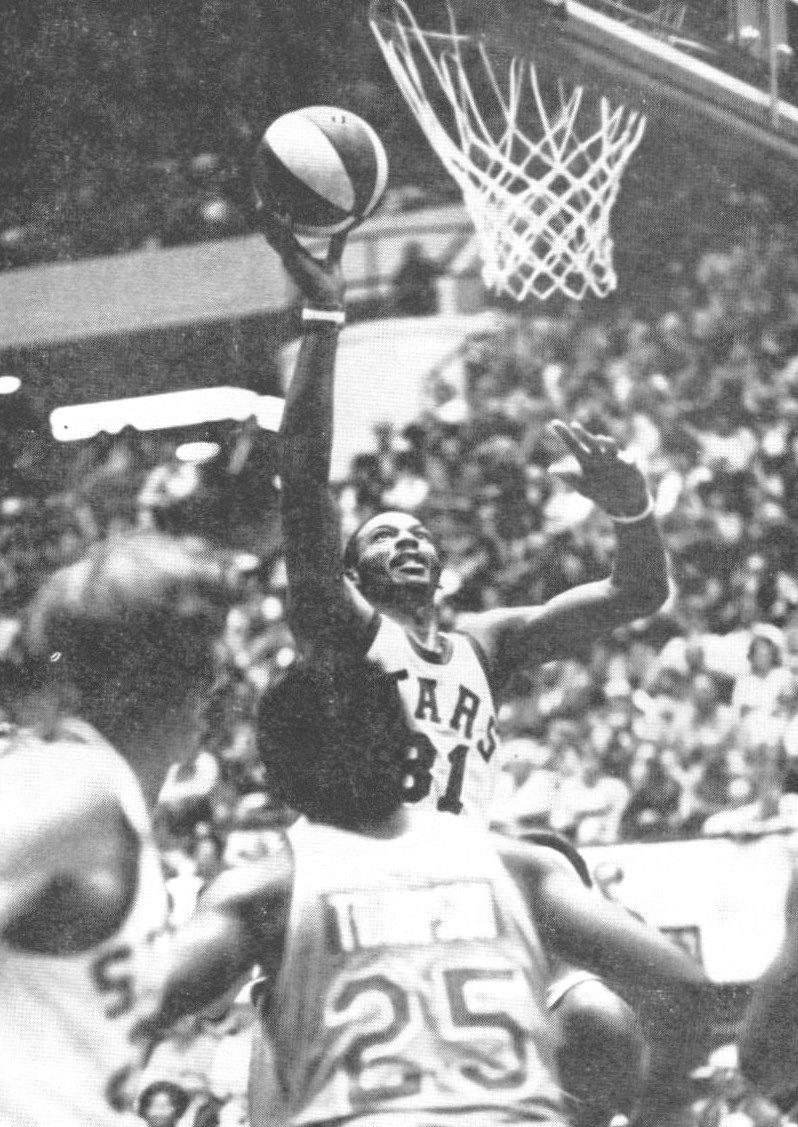
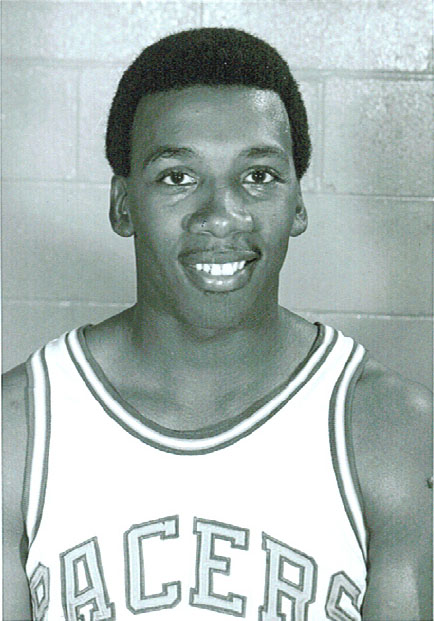
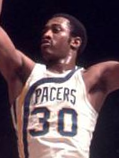
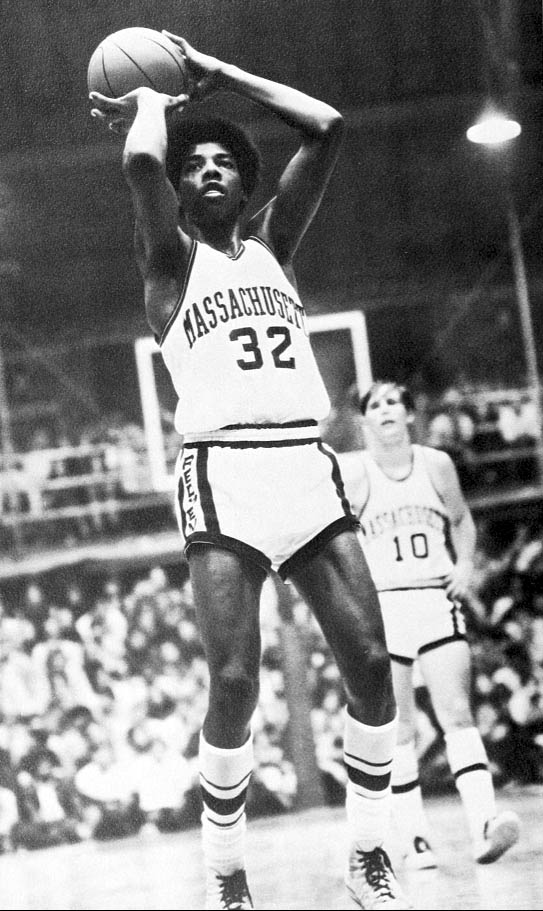
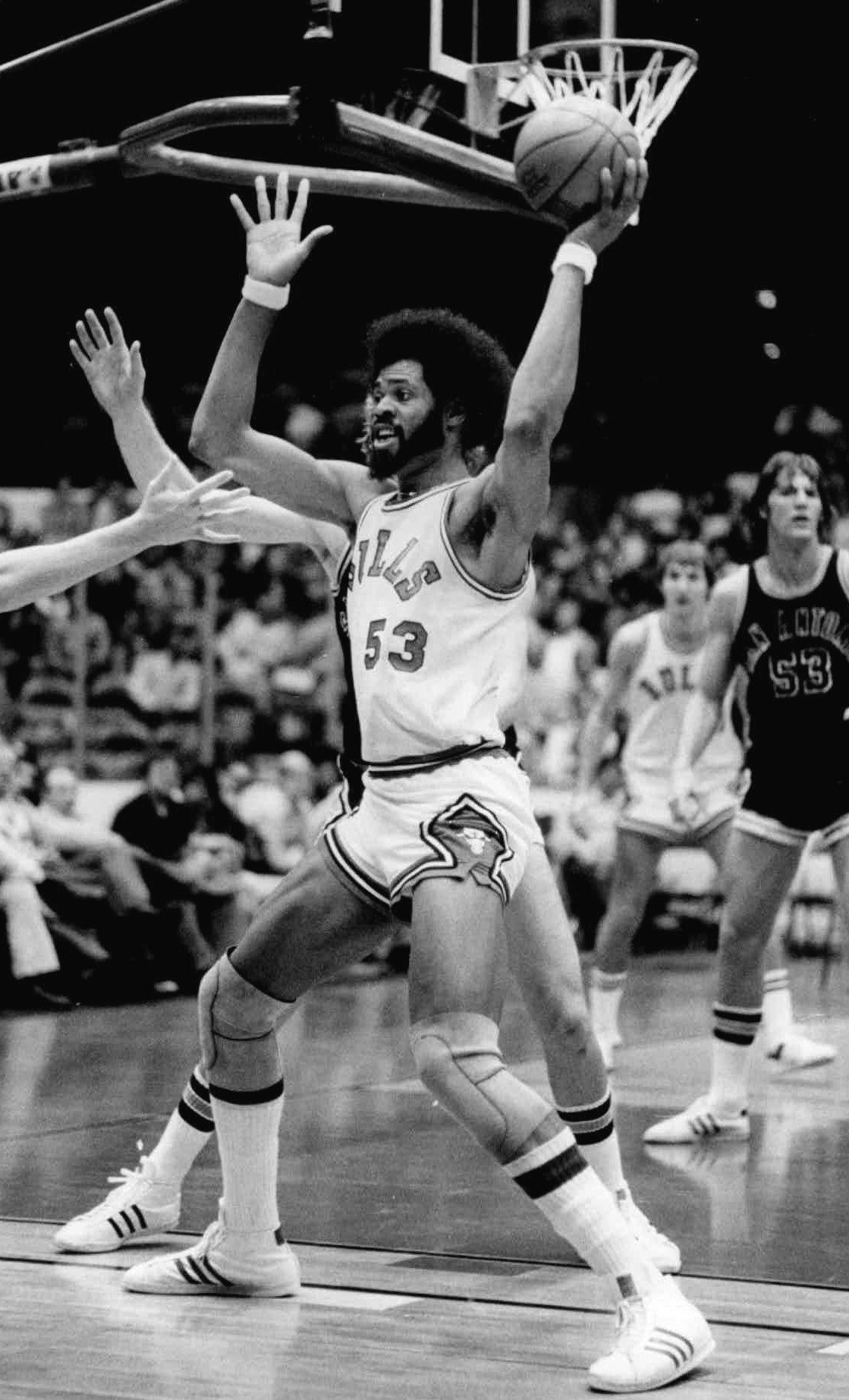
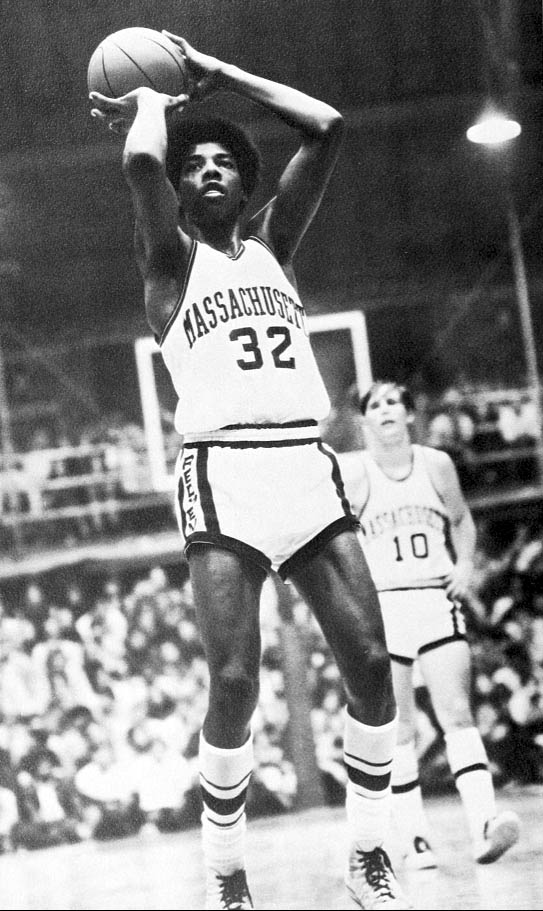

Year	Player	Positions	Team	Note
1968	Connie Hawkins*	F/C	Pittsburgh Pipers	
1969	Warren Jabali	G/F	Oakland Oaks	
1970	Roger Brown*	F/G	Indiana Pacers	
1971	Zelmo Beaty*	C	Utah Stars	
1972	Freddie Lewis	G	Indiana Pacers	
1973	George McGinnis*	F/C	Indiana Pacers	
1974	Julius Erving*	F	New York Nets	
1975	Artis Gilmore*	C	Kentucky Colonels	
1976	Julius Erving* (2)	F	New York Nets	

=== All-Star Game MVP ===
The All-Star Game Most Valuable Player (MVP) was an annual award given to the best player of the annual All-Star Game. The award was established in the 1968 All-Star Game, and was retired as part of the ABA—NBA merger. The first recipient of the award was Larry Brown, who scored 17 points in a losing cause. Brown and 1971 winner Mel Daniels are the only players to win the award while being on the losing team in the All-Star Game. Three rookies have won the award: Brown, Spencer Haywood in the 1970 All-Star Game and David Thompson in the 1976 All-Star Game. From 1968 to 1975, the game has matched the best players in the Eastern Division with the best players in the Western Division. The West has won five All-Star Game MVP awards, while the East won three. In the 1976 All-Star Game, the teams were the Denver Nuggets and the All-Stars. Denver won that All-Star Game, with Thompson as MVP.

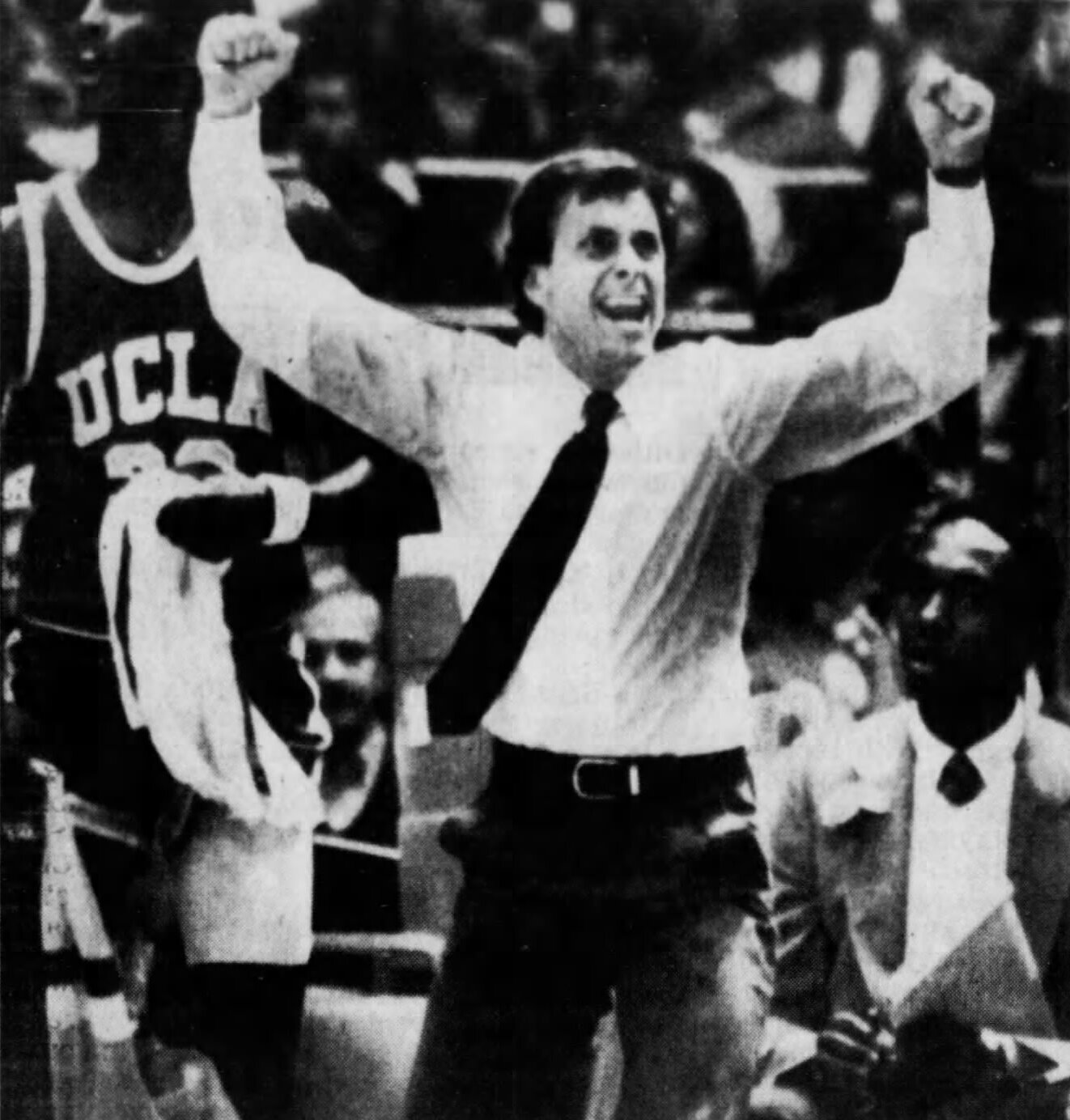
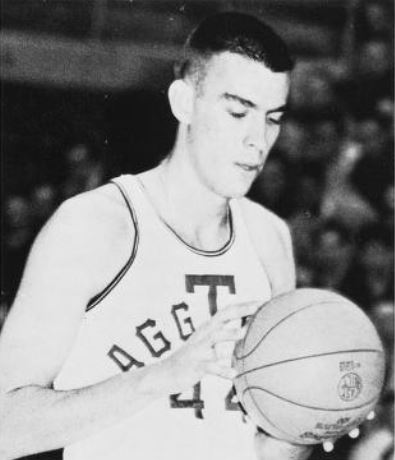
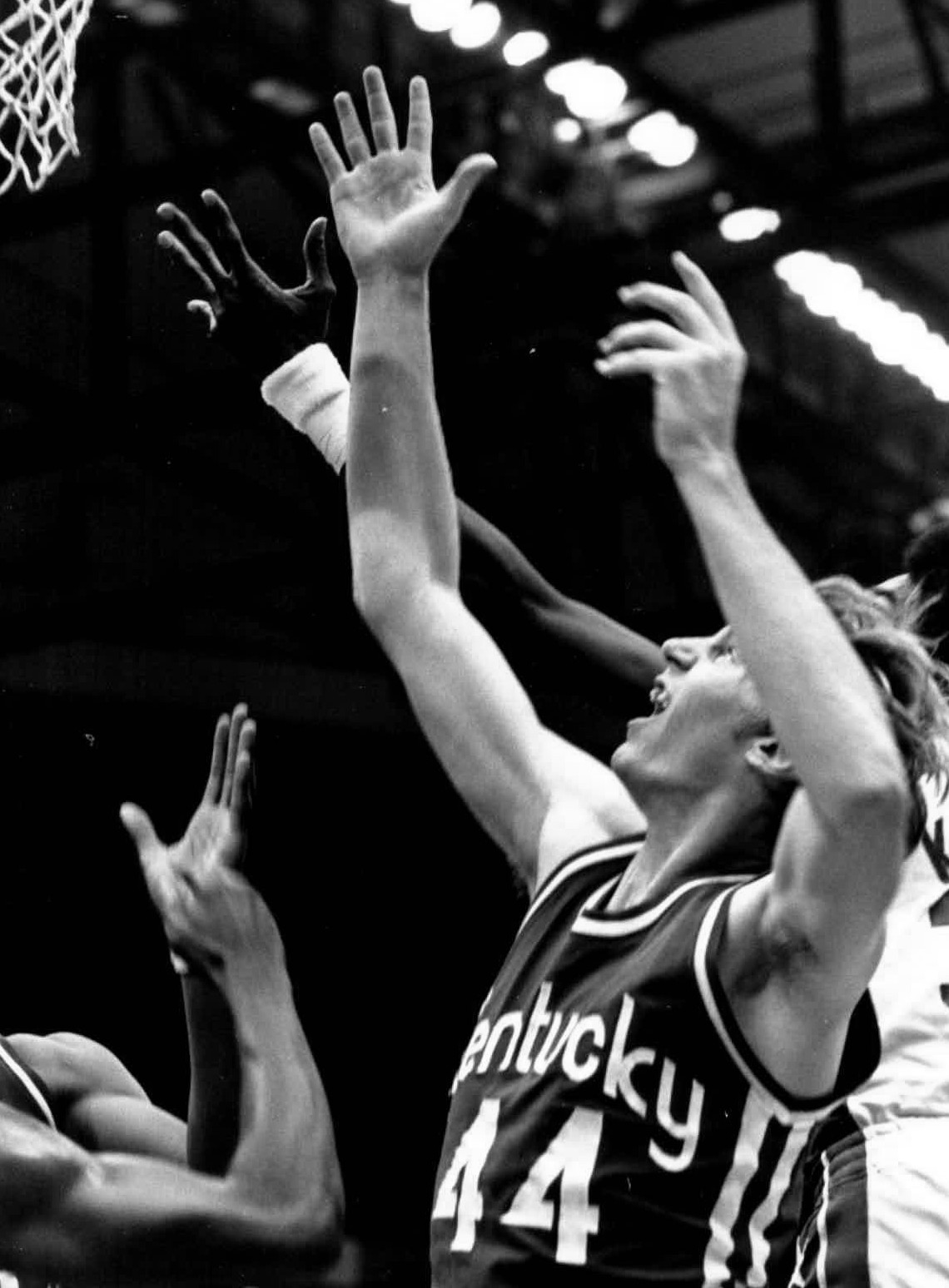
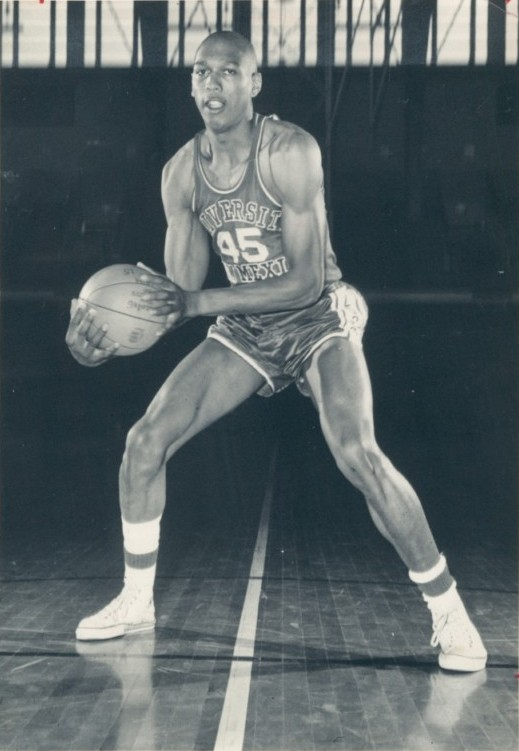
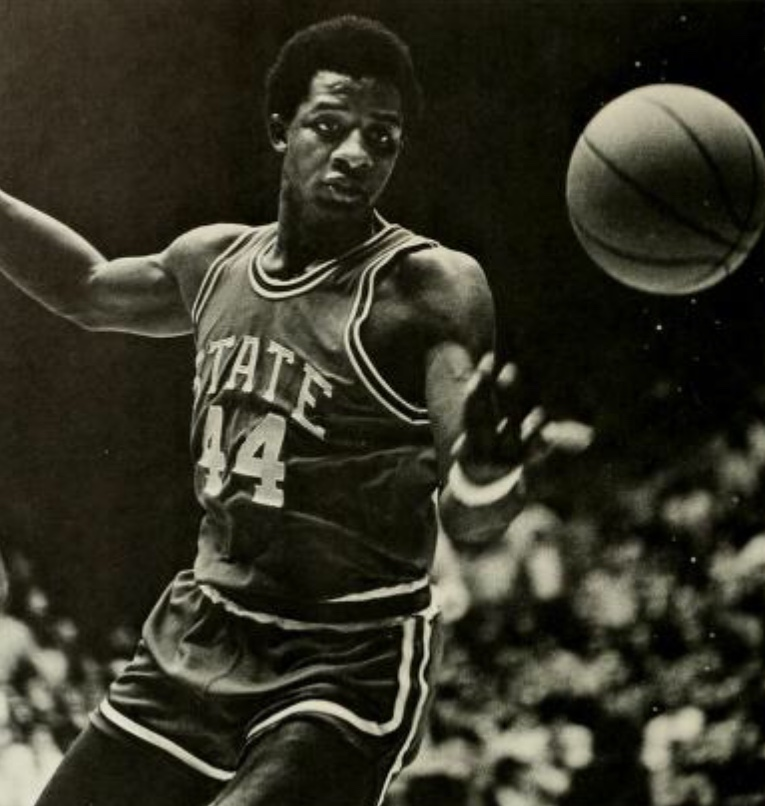
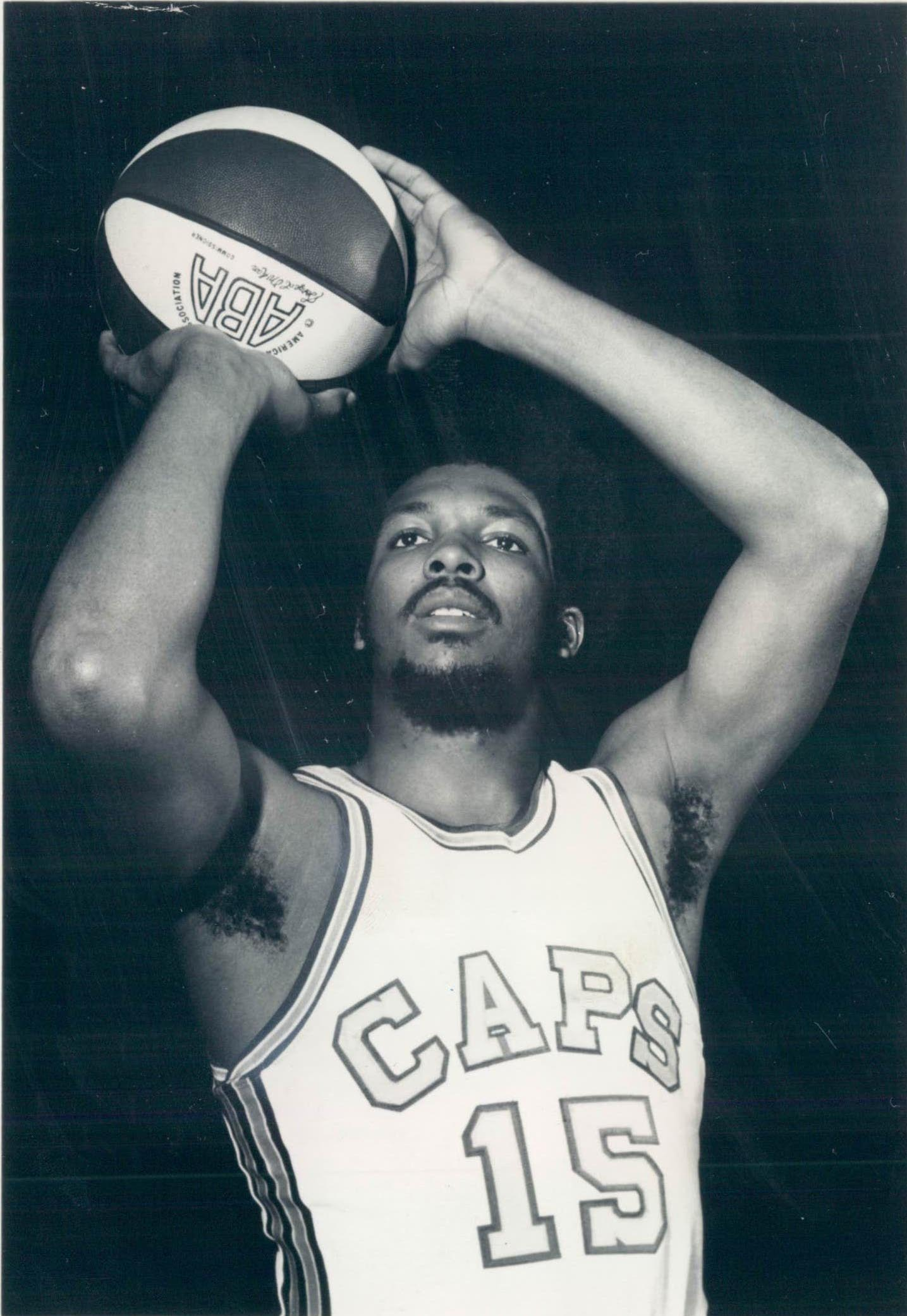
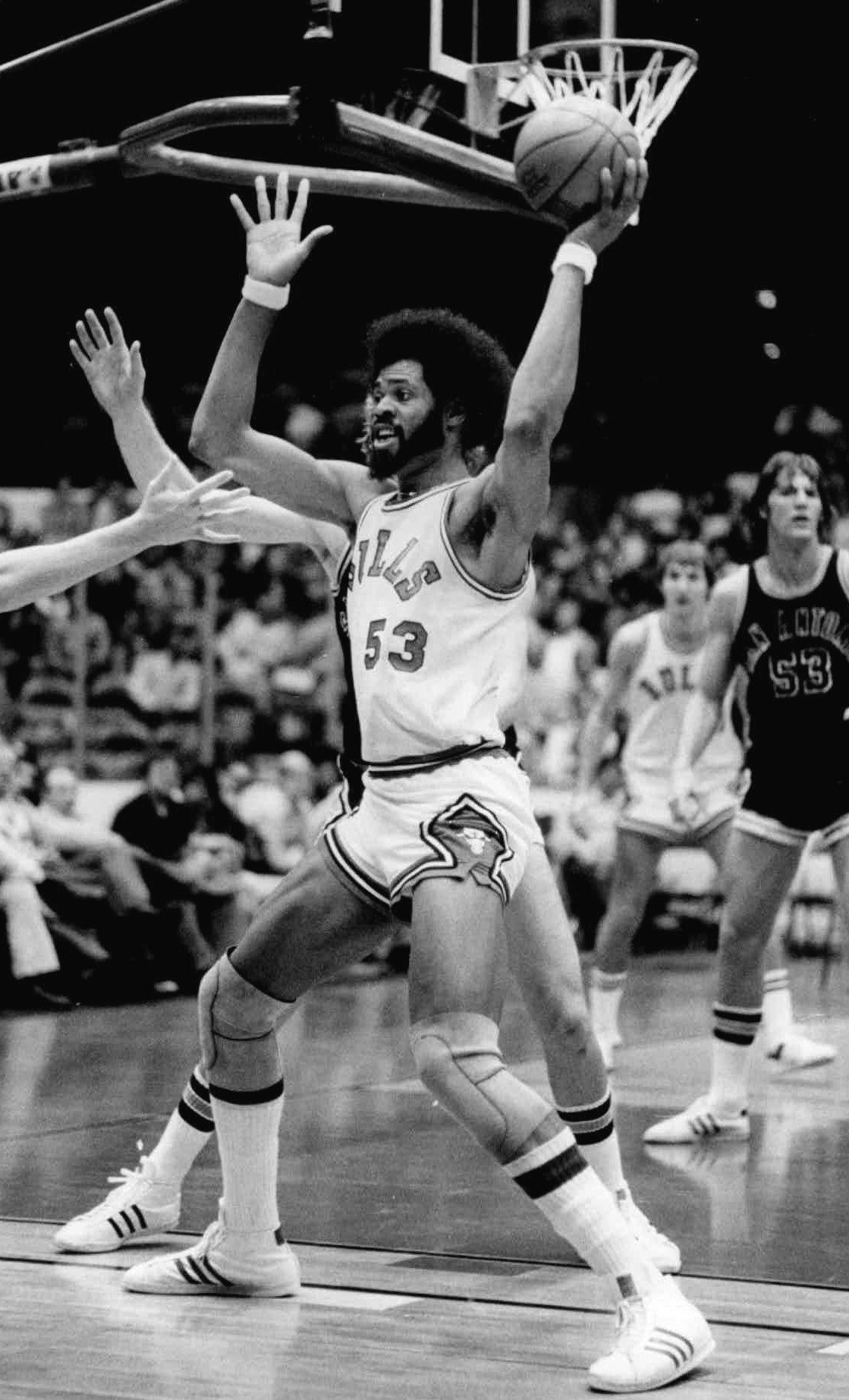
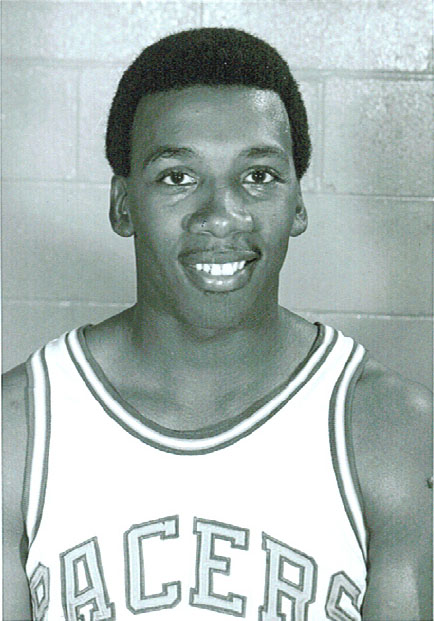
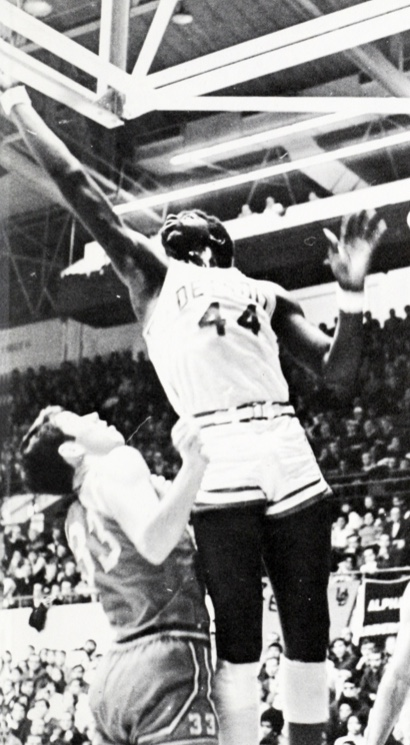

Year	Player	Position	All-Star Team	Team
1968	Larry Brown*	G	West (lost)	New Orleans Buccaneers
1969	John Beasley	F/C	West	Dallas Chaparrals
1970	Spencer Haywood*	F/C	West	Denver Rockets
1971	Mel Daniels*	C	West (lost)	Indiana Pacers
1972	Dan Issel*	C/F	East	Kentucky Colonels
1973	Warren Jabali	G/F	West	Denver Rockets
1974	Artis Gilmore*	C	East	Kentucky Colonels
1975	Freddie Lewis	G	East	Spirits of St. Louis
1976	David Thompson*	G/F	Denver	Denver Nuggets

=== Executive of the Year ===
Season	Executive	Team
1972–73	Carl Scheer	Carolina Cougars
1973–74	Jack Ankerson	San Antonio Spurs
1974–75	Carl Scheer (2)	Denver Nuggets
1975–76	Carl Scheer (3)	Denver Nuggets

- ^{a} Denotes the year in which joint winners were named for the respective award

== Honors ==
*	Elected to the Naismith Memorial Basketball Hall of Fame
Player (X)	Denotes the number of times the player has been selected

=== All-ABA Team ===
The All-ABA Team was an annual honor bestowed on the best players in the league following every ABA season. The team was selected in every season of the league's existence, dating back to its inaugural season in 1967–68. The All-ABA Team was composed of two five-man lineups—a first and second team, each typically consisting of two forwards, one center, and two guards. A tie has occurred only once in the 1970–71 season when Naismith Memorial Basketball Hall of Famers Zelmo Beaty and Dan Issel both were selected to the center position for the All-ABA Second Team.

Mel Daniels, Issel, Artis Gilmore and Julius Erving all tie for the record for the most total selections with five. Rick Barry, Donnie Freeman, Mack Calvin and Louie Dampier each have four total selections, while Larry Jones, Roger Brown, George McGinnis and Ralph Simpson follow with three total selections. Gilmore has the most All-ABA first team selections with five, while Daniels, Barry and Erving are all tied for second-most with four. A total of nine players were selected during their respective rookie years: Daniels, Spencer Haywood, Scott, Issel, Erving, Gilmore, Swen Nater, Marvin Barnes, and David Thompson.

Player (in italic text)	Indicates the player who won the ABA Most Valuable Player in the same year

Season	First Team					Second Team				
Season	Forward	Forward	Center	Guard	Guard	Forward	Forward	Center	Guard	Guard
1967–68	Connie Hawkins, Pittsburgh Pipers	Doug Moe, New Orleans Buccaneers	Mel Daniels, Minnesota Muskies	Larry Jones, Denver Rockets	Charlie Williams, Pittsburgh Pipers	Roger Brown, Indiana Pacers	Cincy Powell, Dallas Chaparrals	John Beasley, Dallas Chaparrals	Larry Brown, New Orleans Buccaneers	Louie Dampier, Kentucky Colonels
1968–69	Connie Hawkins, Minnesota Pipers (2)	Rick Barry, Oakland Oaks	Mel Daniels, Indiana Pacers (2)	Jimmy Jones, New Orleans Buccaneers	Larry Jones, Denver Rockets (2)	John Beasley, Dallas Chaparrals (2)	Doug Moe, Oakland Oaks (2)	Red Robbins, New Orleans Buccaneers	Donnie Freeman, Miami Floridians	Louie Dampier, Kentucky Colonels (2)
1969–70	Rick Barry, Washington Capitols (2)	Spencer Haywood, Denver Rockets	Mel Daniels, Indiana Pacers (3)	Bob Verga, Carolina Cougars	Larry Jones, Denver Rockets (3)	Roger Brown, Indiana Pacers (2)	Bob Netolicky, Indiana Pacers	Red Robbins, New Orleans Buccaneers (2)	Louie Dampier, Kentucky Colonels (3)	Donnie Freeman, Miami Floridians (2)
1970–71	Roger Brown, Indiana Pacers (3)	Rick Barry, New York Nets (3)	Mel Daniels, Indiana Pacers (4)	Mack Calvin, The Floridians	Charlie Scott, Virginia Squires	John Brisker, Pittsburgh Condors	Joe Caldwell, Carolina Cougars	Zelmo Beaty, Utah Stars (tie)	Donnie Freeman, Texas Chaparrals (3)	Larry Cannon, Denver Rockets
1970–71	Roger Brown, Indiana Pacers (3)	Rick Barry, New York Nets (3)	Mel Daniels, Indiana Pacers (4)	Mack Calvin, The Floridians	Charlie Scott, Virginia Squires	John Brisker, Pittsburgh Condors	Joe Caldwell, Carolina Cougars	Dan Issel, Kentucky Colonels (tie)	Donnie Freeman, Texas Chaparrals (3)	Larry Cannon, Denver Rockets
1971–72	Dan Issel, Kentucky Colonels (2)	Rick Barry, New York Nets (4)	Artis Gilmore, Kentucky Colonels	Donnie Freeman, Dallas Chaparrals (4)	Bill Melchionni, New York Nets	Willie Wise, Utah Stars	Julius Erving, Virginia Squires	Zelmo Beaty, Utah Stars (2)	Ralph Simpson, Denver Rockets	Charlie Scott, Virginia Squires (2)
1972–73	Billy Cunningham, Carolina Cougars	Julius Erving, Virginia Squires (2)	Artis Gilmore, Kentucky Colonels (2)	Jimmy Jones, Utah Stars (2)	Warren Jabali, Denver Rockets	George McGinnis, Indiana Pacers	Dan Issel, Kentucky Colonels (3)	Mel Daniels, Indiana Pacers (5)	Ralph Simpson, Denver Rockets (2)	Mack Calvin, Carolina Cougars (2)
1973–74	Julius Erving, New York Nets (3)	George McGinnis, Indiana Pacers (2)	Artis Gilmore, Kentucky Colonels (3)	Jimmy Jones, Utah Stars (3)	Mack Calvin, Carolina Cougars (3)	Dan Issel, Kentucky Colonels (4)	Willie Wise, Utah Stars (2)	Swen Nater, San Antonio Spurs	Ron Boone, Utah Stars	Louie Dampier, Kentucky Colonels (4)
1974–75	Julius Erving, New York Nets (4)	George McGinnis, Indiana Pacers (3)	Artis Gilmore, Kentucky Colonels (4)	Mack Calvin, Denver Nuggets (4)	Ron Boone, Utah Stars (2)	Marvin Barnes, Spirits of St. Louis	George Gervin, San Antonio Spurs	Swen Nater, San Antonio Spurs (2)	Brian Taylor, New York Nets	James Silas, San Antonio Spurs
1975–76	Julius Erving, New York Nets (5)	Billy Knight, Indiana Pacers	Artis Gilmore, Kentucky Colonels (5)	James Silas, San Antonio Spurs (2)	Ralph Simpson, Denver Nuggets (3)	David Thompson, Denver Nuggets	Bobby Jones, Denver Nuggets	Dan Issel, Denver Nuggets (5)	Don Buse, Indiana Pacers	George Gervin, San Antonio Spurs (2)

=== All-Defensive Team ===
The All-Defensive Team was an annual honor bestowed on the best defensive players in the league from the 1972–73 season to the season when the league merged with the NBA. The All-Defensive Team was composed of a five-man lineup without regard to position. Artis Gilmore holds the record for the most selections with four, while Mike Gale, Julius Keye, Fatty Taylor, Willie Wise, Don Buse, Bobby Jones and Brian Taylor follow with two selections. Bobby Jones was the only player to be selected during his rookie year.

Season	Selections					
1972–73	Joe Caldwell	Mike Gale	Artis Gilmore*	Julius Keye	Fatty Taylor	Willie Wise
1973–74	Mike Gale (2)	Artis Gilmore (2)*	Julius Keye (2)	Ted McClain	Fatty Taylor (2)	Willie Wise (2)
1974–75	Don Buse	Artis Gilmore (3)*	Bobby Jones*	Wil Jones	Brian Taylor	The sixth player was not selected
1975–76	Don Buse (2)	Julius Erving*	Artis Gilmore (4)*	Bobby Jones (2)	Brian Taylor (2)	The sixth player was not selected

=== All-Rookie Team ===
The All-Rookie Team was an annual honor given to the top rookies during the regular season. The team was selected in every season of the league's existence, dating back to its inaugural season in 1967–68. The All-Rookie Team was composed of a five-man lineup.

Player (in italic text)	Indicates the player who won the ABA Rookie of the Year in the same year

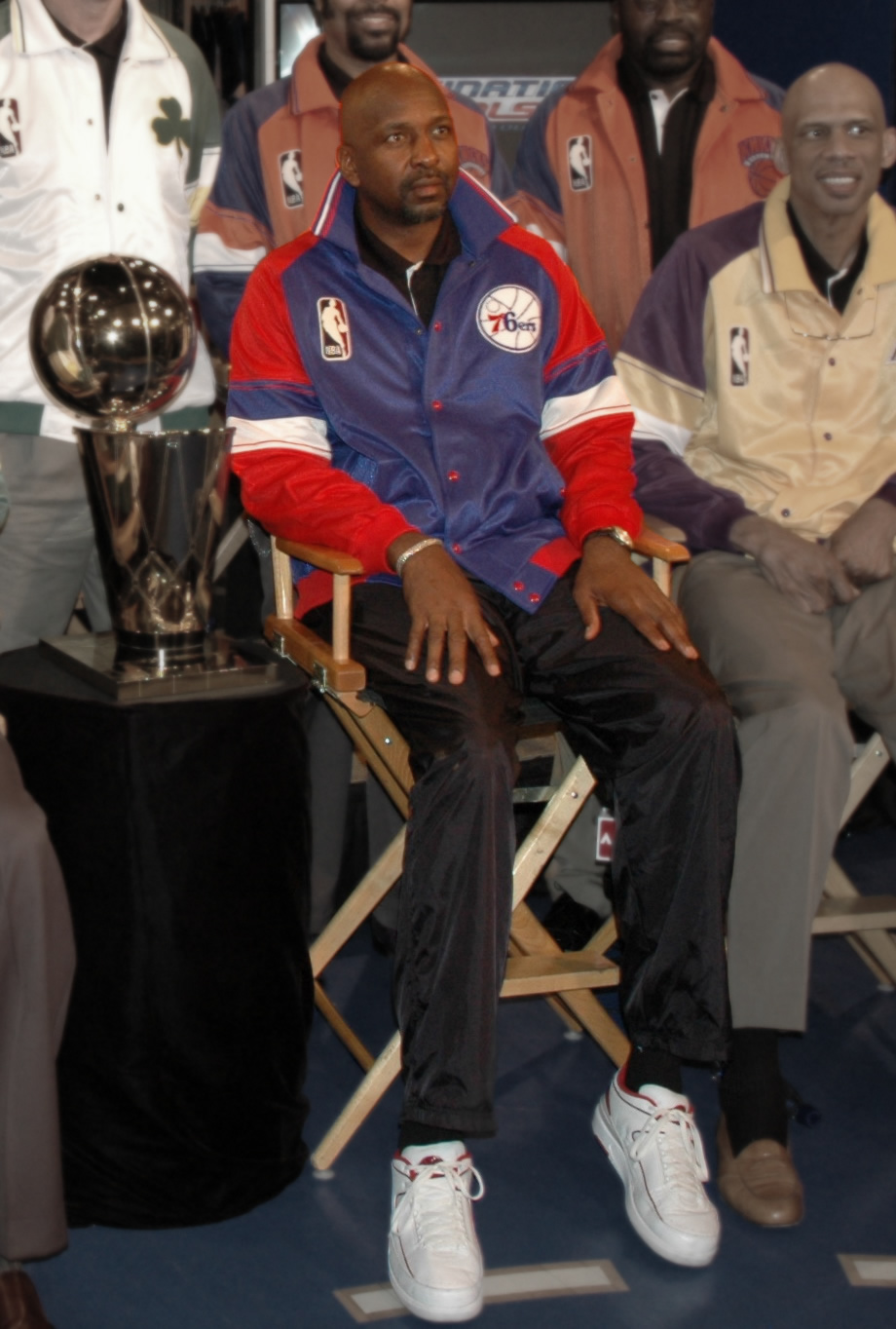
Hall of Famer Moses Malone was part of the 1974–75 All-Rookie Team.

Season	Selections				
1967–68	Louie Dampier*	Mel Daniels*	Jimmy Jones	Bob Netolicky	Trooper Washington
1968–69	Ron Boone	Warren Jabali	Larry Miller	Gene Moore	Walter Piatkowski
1969–70	Mike Barrett	John Brisker	Mack Calvin	Spencer Haywood*	Willie Wise
1970–71	Joe Hamilton	Dan Issel*	Wendell Ladner	Samuel Robinson	Charlie Scott*
1971–72	Julius Erving*	Artis Gilmore*	George McGinnis*	Johnny Neumann	John Roche
1972–73	Jim Chones	George Gervin*	James Silas	Brian Taylor	Dennis Wuycik
1973–74	Mike Green	Larry Kenon	Bo Lamar	Swen Nater	John Williamson
1974–75	Marvin Barnes	Gus Gerard	Bobby Jones*	Billy Knight	Moses Malone*
1975–76	Ticky Burden	M. L. Carr	Kim Hughes	Mark Olberding	David Thompson*
