= 1970–71 Indiana Pacers season =

ABA professional basketball team season

- Division champions
- Head coach: Bobby Leonard
- Arena: Indiana State Fair Coliseum

Results
- Record: 58–26 (.690)
- Place: Division: 1st (Eastern)
- Playoff finish: Division finals (lost to Stars 3–4)
- Stats at Basketball Reference

The 1970–71 Indiana Pacers season was Indiana's fourth season in the American Basketball Association and fourth as a team. Entering this season, the Pacers sought to repeat as champions of the entire ABA, as well as remain in the state of Indiana so that they would be financially stable enough to showcase that a champion team in the ABA can stay intact and not move elsewhere for various reasons. This season saw the Pacers come close to matching their best record at the time with a 58–26 record helping solidify them as the Western Division champions by the end of the regular season. In the 1971 ABA Playoffs, the Pacers would sweep the Memphis Pros, but ultimately lose a seven-game series to the eventual champion Utah Stars (who would get their revenge after losing the 1970 ABA Playoffs' championship match in what turned out to their last games played under the original Los Angeles Stars name); for the next few seasons after that, the Stars would become bitter divisional rivals with the Pacers during their ABA tenure before the Utah franchise eventually folded operations by December 1975 during what later became the final ABA season played.

== ABA Draft ==
Player	School/Club team
Dennis Awtrey	Santa Clara
Vince Fritz	Oregon State
Surry Oliver	Stephen F. Austin
Don Curnutt	Miami
Rick Erickson	Washington State
Billy Jones	Louisiana College
Jerry Kroll	Davidson
Bob Riley	Mt. St. Mary's
Heyward Dotson	Columbia
Mickey Foster	Arizona
Seaburn Hill	Arizona State
Ted Hillery	St. Joseph's (IN)
Jeff Sewell	Marquette

== Roster ==
1969–70 Indiana Pacers roster
Players

Pos.	No.	Player	Height	Weight	DOB	From
SG	12	John Barnhill	6 ft 1 in (1.85 m)	180 lb (82 kg)	March 20, 1938	Tennessee State
PF	43	Art Becker	6 ft 7 in (2.01 m)	205 lb (93 kg)	January 12, 1942	Arizona State
SF	35	Roger Brown	6 ft 5 in (1.96 m)	205 lb (93 kg)	May 22, 1942	Dayton
SF	22	Wayne Chapman	6 ft 6 in (1.98 m)	190 lb (86 kg)	June 15, 1945	Western Kentucky
C	34	Mel Daniels	6 ft 9 in (2.06 m)	220 lb (100 kg)	July 20, 1944	New Mexico
PF	23	Earle Higgins	6 ft 8 in (2.03 m)	195 lb (88 kg)	December 30, 1946	Eastern Michigan
SG	15	Warren Jabali	6 ft 2 in (1.88 m)	200 lb (91 kg)	August 29, 1946	Wichita State
SG	11	Billy Keller	5 ft 10 in (1.78 m)	177 lb (80 kg)	August 30, 1947	Purdue
PG	14	Freddie Lewis	6 ft 0 in (1.83 m)	175 lb (79 kg)	July 1, 1943	Arizona State
SF	32	Jay Miller	6 ft 5 in (1.96 m)	205 lb (93 kg)	July 19, 1943	Notre Dame
SG	10	Rick Mount	6 ft 3 in (1.91 m)	175 lb (79 kg)	January 5, 1947	Purdue
PF	24	Bob Netolicky	6 ft 9 in (2.06 m)	220 lb (100 kg)	August 2, 1942	Drake
PF	33	Don Sidle	6 ft 8 in (2.03 m)	215 lb (98 kg)	June 21, 1946	Oklahoma
PG	44	Tom Thacker	6 ft 2 in (1.88 m)	170 lb (77 kg)	November 2, 1939	Cincinnati

Coaches
Head coach
- Bobby Leonard

Legend
- (DP) Unsigned draft pick
- (FA) Free agent
- (S) Suspended
- Injured

Roster

== Season standings ==
=== Western Division ===
Team	W	L	Pct.
Indiana Pacers	58	26	.690
Utah Stars	57	27	.679
Memphis Pros	41	43	.488
Texas Chaparrals	30	54	.357
Denver Rockets	30	54	.357

== Awards, records, and honors ==
- Mel Daniels (averaged 21.0 points, 18.0 rebounds, and 2.2 assists) won the ABA MVP award for the second time in four years; he last won the award in the 1968–69 ABA season. Mel Daniels also won the ABA All-Star Game MVP

=== ABA All-Stars ===
- Roger Brown
- Mel Daniels
- Bob Netolicky

== Team leaders ==
Stat	Player	Average per game
Points	Mel Daniels	21.0
Assists	Bill Keller and Freddie Lewis	5.3
Rebounds	Mel Daniels	18.0 (4.8 offensive and 13.2 defensive rebounds)
FG%	Donald Sidle	.548
Minutes	Roger Brown	41.0

== ABA Playoffs ==
ABA Western Division Semifinals vs Memphis Pros

Game	Date	Location	Score	Record	Attendance
1	April 2	Indiana	114–98	1–0	7,562
2	April 3	Indiana	106–104	2–0	8,701
3	April 5	Memphis	91–90	3–0	4,107
4	April 7	Memphis	102–101	4–0	3,681

Pacers win series, 4–0

ABA Western Division Finals vs Utah Stars

Game	Date	Location	Score	Record	Attendance
1	April 12	Indiana	118–120	0–1	7,734
2	April 14	Indiana	120–107	1–1	9,458
3	April 17	Utah	107–121	1–2	12,711
4	April 20	Utah	99–126	1–3	12,761
5	April 22	Indiana	127–109	2–3	8,279
6	April 24	Utah	105–102	3–3	13,208
7	April 28	Indiana	101–108	3–4	11,202

Pacers lose series, 4–3
