= General Barrett =

General Barrett may refer to:

- Arthur Barrett (Indian Army officer) (1857–1926), British Indian Army general
- Charles D. Barrett (1885–1943), U.S. Marine Corps major general
- Michael B. Barrett (born c. 1946), U.S. Army brigadier general
- Sam C. Barrett (fl. 1980s–2020s), U.S. Air Force lieutenant general

== See also ==
- William Cross Barratt (1862–1940), British Army major general
- John Davenport Barrette (1862–1934), U.S. Army brigadier general
- Luís do Rego Barreto (1777–1840), Kingdom of Portugal lieutenant general
- Attorney General Barrett (disambiguation)
