= Red Robbins =

American basketball player

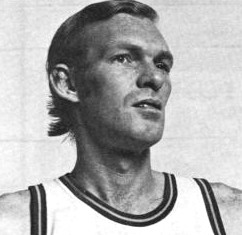
- Robbins circa 1972

Personal information
- Born: September 30, 1944 Leesburg, Florida, U.S.
- Died: November 18, 2009 (aged 65) Metairie, Louisiana, U.S.
- Listed height: 6 ft 8 in (2.03 m)
- Listed weight: 190 lb (86 kg)

Career information
- High school: Groveland (Groveland, Florida)
- College: Chipola (1962–1964); Tennessee (1964–1966)
- NBA draft: 1966: 6th round, 59th overall pick
- Drafted by: Philadelphia 76ers
- Playing career: 1966–1977
- Position: Center / power forward
- Number: 21, 9, 24

Career history
- 1966–1967: Olimpia Milano
- 1967–1970: New Orleans Buccaneers
- 1970–1972: Utah Stars
- 1972–1973: San Diego Conquistadors
- 1973–1974: Kentucky Colonels
- 1974–1975: Virginia Squires
- 1975–1976: Olimpia Milano

Career highlights
- ABA champion (1971); 3× ABA All-Star (1968, 1969, 1971); All-ABA Second Team (1969)
- Stats at Basketball Reference

Austin "Red" Robbins (September 30, 1944 – November 18, 2009) was an American basketball player.

Robbins, a 6'8" power forward/center from Leesburg, Florida, starred at the University of Tennessee in the 1960s and then played professionally for the American Basketball Association's New Orleans Buccaneers (1967–1970), Utah Stars (1970–1972), San Diego Conquistadors (1972–1973; 1973–1974), Kentucky Colonels (1973; 1974–1975), and Virginia Squires (1975–1976). Robbins was nicknamed for his red hair and perceived fiery personality, and grabbed over 6,000 rebounds in his career. Robbins was also an offensive contributor with a .466 field goal percentage; and led the ABA in three pointer percentage, with a .408 mark, in the 1971-72 season. In Game 7 of the 1971 ABA Western Division playoffs, he made 11 out of 12 field goals to lead the Utah Stars to a 108–101 victory en route to the league title.

== Death ==
Robbins died in Metairie, Louisiana on November 18, 2009, aged 65, after having battled cancer.
