= Michael Barratt =

Michael Barratt may refer to:

- Michael Barratt (television presenter) (1928–2022), British television presenter
- Michael Barratt (astronaut) (born 1959), American astronaut
- Shakin' Stevens (Michael Barratt, born 1948), Welsh singer

== See also ==
- Michael Barrett (disambiguation)
