= Mel Daniels =

American basketball player and coach (1944–2015)

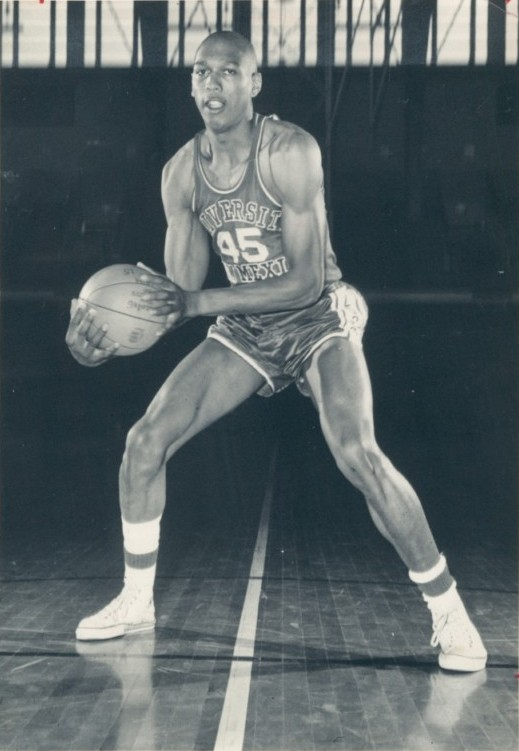
- Daniels in 1967

Personal information
- Born: July 20, 1944 Detroit, Michigan, U.S.
- Died: October 30, 2015 (aged 71) Sheridan, Indiana, U.S.
- Listed height: 6 ft 9 in (2.06 m)
- Listed weight: 220 lb (100 kg)

Career information
- High school: John J. Pershing (Detroit, Michigan)
- College: Southeastern CC (1963–1964); New Mexico (1964–1967)
- NBA draft: 1967: 1st round, 9th overall pick
- Drafted by: Cincinnati Royals
- Playing career: 1967–1976
- Position: Center
- Number: 34, 9
- Coaching career: 1977–1993

Career history

Playing
- 1967–1968: Minnesota Muskies
- 1968–1974: Indiana Pacers
- 1974–1975: Memphis Sounds
- 1976: New York Nets

Career highlights
- 3× ABA champion (1970, 1972, 1973); 2× ABA MVP (1969, 1971); 7× ABA All-Star (1968–1974); ABA All-Star Game MVP (1969); 4× All-ABA First Team (1968–1971); All-ABA Second Team (1973); ABA Rookie of the Year (1968); ABA All-Rookie First Team (1968); 3× ABA rebounding champion (1968, 1969, 1971); ABA All-Time Team; No. 34 retired by Indiana Pacers; Consensus second-team All-American (1967); 2× First-team All-WAC (1966, 1967)

Career ABA and NBA statistics
- Points: 11,778 (18.4 ppg)
- Rebounds: 9,528 (14.9 rpg)
- Assists: 1,140 (1.8 apg)
- Stats at NBA.com
- Stats at Basketball Reference
- Basketball Hall of Fame

Melvin Joe Daniels (July 20, 1944 – October 30, 2015) was an American professional basketball player. He played in the American Basketball Association (ABA) for the Minnesota Muskies, Indiana Pacers, and Memphis Sounds, and in the National Basketball Association (NBA) for the New York Nets. One of the greatest players in ABA history, Daniels was a two-time ABA Most Valuable Player, three-time ABA Champion and a seven-time ABA All-Star. Daniels was the All-time ABA rebounding leader, and in 1997, he was named a unanimous selection to the ABA All-Time Team. Daniels was enshrined into the Naismith Memorial Basketball Hall of Fame in 2012.

== Early life ==
The son of Maceo and Bernice Daniels, Mel Daniels moved with his family back to his birthplace of Detroit, Michigan, from Lincoln, North Carolina, when Mel was a toddler. Mel had two sisters. Back in Detroit, the family first lived with Mel's grandfather, then in a tenement on 8 Mile Road and finally in a house on McDougall Street. Maceo Daniels worked in an automobile parts factory.

Bernice read poetry to Mel. He began writing poems by age eight and continued to write them throughout the rest of his life, generally focusing on the lives of athletes, but wrote poems about non-sports topics as well. Daniels mostly did not share his poems with his teammates, “This is the side I’ve kept quiet,” he said of his poems.

Daniels attended Pershing High School in Detroit. Pershing also produced Spencer Haywood, Ralph Simpson, Kevin Willis, Ted Sizemore and Steve Smith.

Will Robinson, physical education teacher and basketball coach at Pershing High School, recalled Daniels being absent from PE class for a few weeks. So Mr. Robinson went looking for the truant Daniels and finally found him in the hallway and ordered him to the gym. A few days later, Daniels still had not appeared in class, so Robinson went looking for him again. The way Mel Daniels, then a sophomore, remembered it, he was ordered by Coach Robinson to report to the gymnasium at 3:30 to join the basketball team.

"Chief, I want you in the gym today," Daniels recalled Coach Robinson telling him. "If you're not in the gym, I'm going to come get you and beat your a—." Will Robinson would win two state championships at Pershing, become the first black NCAA Division I coach at Illinois State in 1970 and later scout for the NFL Detroit Lions and NBA Detroit Pistons.

Daniels was slow to earn playing time in high school, playing sparingly in junior varsity games his first two seasons. He was also slow in running fitness laps under Coach Robinson's direction. "Jesus Christ, he would always be a bad last," Robinson recalled. "Not just last, but a bad last. The guys would lap him. He had a winning spirit. He tried all the time after he found out the swing of things."

Ted Sizemore, later a major league baseball player, was a high school basketball teammate of Daniels and recalled, "Will (Robinson) worked him. One thing Mel never did was give up. He kept coming back and Will made him work, work, work. He just kept developing and developing. He just did a lot of work. A lot of drills, footwork, handling the ball. He just got coordinated all of a sudden."

After growing to 6'9", Daniels showed his potential as a senior and Robinson helped him secure a scholarship at Burlington Community College in Iowa.

== College career (1963–1967) ==
Daniels continued to improve in college. Playing the 1963–1964 season at Burlington Community College in Burlington, Iowa, Daniels averaged 25.2 points and 10.0 rebounds and was named a Junior College All-American. While at Burlington, Daniels was recruited to play for the New Mexico Lobos by coach Bob King. Daniels transferred, played for New Mexico from 1964 to 1967, averaged 20 points per game in his New Mexico Lobo career and was named an All-American.

Starting as a sophomore in 1964–65, the 6–9 power forward played in 27 games and averaged 17.0 points and 11.2 rebounds as New Mexico finished 19–8.

During the 1965–66 season, Daniels suffered a severe injury when he put his arm through a glass door at Johnson Gymnasium, requiring 352 stitches and almost ending his athletic career. With various sutures being put on him to close the wound over the coming days, Daniels missed only one game and averaged 21.2 points and 10.3 rebounds as the Lobos finished 16–8.

The 1966–67 team won a school-record 17 straight games to start the season as New Mexico climbed to No. 3 in the national rankings. Daniels led the Western Athletic Conference in scoring at 21.5 points, along with 11.6 rebounds as New Mexico finished 19–8.

For his career, Daniels averaged 20.0 points and 11.1 rebounds in 77 games at New Mexico. He had 44 career double-doubles, still the most in school history.

== ABA/NBA career ==
Daniels was the ninth pick of the 1967 NBA draft, selected by the Cincinnati Royals, and was also drafted by the Minnesota Muskies of the American Basketball Association (ABA). He chose to play in the fledgling ABA.

After rejecting Cincinnati (with Oscar Robertson), Daniels became the first NBA first-round pick to snub the established league and go to the ABA. "At that time, it wasn't about money for me. But y'know, 2 + 2 is still 4," Daniels said of his decision to go to the ABA. "I was offered $15,000 by Cincinnati as a bonus and $17,500 as a salary. I was offered $15,000 as a bonus in Minnesota and $30,000 as a salary. So the higher number somehow won out."

Daniels's decision to play in the ABA led to great success for him. Daniels won three ABA championships, was a two-time ABA Most Valuable Player, a seven-time ABA All-star and led the ABA in rebounding average in three different seasons. Daniels is the ABA's all-time leader in total rebounds and second in ABA career average rebounds (15.12) behind only fellow Hall of Famer Artis Gilmore of the Kentucky Colonels (17.07). His seven All-Star selections are tied with Louie Dampier for most in ABA history. Daniels had 1,608 career postseason rebounds in the ABA.

=== Minnesota Muskies (1967–1968) ===
As a rookie in 1967–68 with the Minnesota Muskies, Daniels was named the American Basketball Association Rookie of the Year. He averaged 22.2 points and a league leading 15.6 rebounds in 78 games, as Minnesota finished 50–28 under coach Jim Pollard. Minnesota lost to the eventual ABA champion Pittsburgh Pipers with Connie Hawkins in the 1968 ABA Playoffs, as Daniels averaged 25.3 points and 16.1 rebounds in 10 playoff games. After the 1967–68 season, Daniels was traded to the Indiana Pacers for cash (reportedly, $75,000), Jimmy Dawson and Ron Kozlicki, as Minnesota was experiencing financial difficulty. Minnesota moved to become the Miami Floridians after the one season in Minnesota.

=== Indiana Pacers (1968–1974) ===
With Indiana in 1968–69, Daniels was named the ABA Most Valuable Player as he averaged 24.0 points and an ABA leading 16.5 rebounds. With Hall of Fame Coach Slick Leonard taking over from Larry Staverman as the Pacers coach early in the season, in the 1969 ABA Playoffs, Indiana, defeated the Kentucky Colonels 4–3, Daniels's former team, the Miami Floridians 4–1 before losing to the Oakland Oaks with Rick Barry 4–1 in the 1969 ABA Finals.

"Slick was one of the most creative, innovative coaches ever," Daniels said of his longtime Pacers coach. "He would change our offense at halftime. He'd create six new plays and we executed them the way he drew them up on the board."

In 1969–70, Indiana won the 1970 ABA championship with a 4–2 series win over the Los Angeles Stars in the ABA Finals. Daniels averaged 18.7 points and 17.6 rebounds in the regular season, as Indiana finished 59–25. Hall of Famer Roger Brown, Bob Netolicky, John Barnhill and Freddie Lewis helped lead the Pacers to the ABA Title. Daniels averaged 19.3 points and 17.7 rebounds in the playoffs.

In 1970–71, the Pacers finished 58–26, as Daniels was again named the ABA Most Valuable Player. He averaged 21.0 points, a league leading 18.0 rebounds and 2.2 assists. The Pacers were defeated by the Utah Stars 4–3 in the Western Division Finals in the 1971 ABA Playoffs. Daniels averaged 21.4 points and 19.2 rebounds in the playoffs.

In 1971–72 the Pacers added Hall of Famer George McGinnis. They then won their second ABA Title, as they defeated the Denver Rockets 4–3, the Utah Stars 4–3 and the New York Nets with Rick Barry 4–2 in the 1972 ABA Finals. Daniels averaged 19.2 points, 16.4 rebounds and 2.2 assists as Indiana finished the regular season 47–37. Daniels averaged 15.3 points and 15.1 rebounds in the playoffs.

The Pacers won their third ABA championship in 1972–73. Daniels averaged 18.5 points and 15.4 rebounds alongside McGinnis (27.6 points and 12.5 rebounds), as Indiana finished 51–33. In the 1973 ABA Playoffs, Indiana, defeated the Denver Rockets 4–1 and the Utah Stars 4–2. In the 1973 ABA Finals the Pacers defeated the Kentucky Colonels with Hall of Famers Artis Gilmore, Dan Issel, Louis Dampier and former Pacer teammate Rick Mount 4–3 to capture the ABA championship. Daniels averaged 15.9 points and 13.8 rebounds in the playoffs.

In his last season in Indiana, Daniels averaged a double-double 15.4 points and 11.6 rebounds in 1973–74. The Pacers finished 46–38 and lost to the Utah Stars in the Western Conference finals in the 1974 ABA Playoffs, with Daniels averaging 12.2 points and 11.4 rebounds in the playoffs.

Head coach Bobby Leonard described Daniels as "the leader on the ballclub. He expected his teammates to bring it every night and he would get on 'em. But off the floor, he was like a big bear." Daniels used his size and strength to go with an interest to "knock guys down" on his way to stellar defense.

In 479 career games with the Indiana Pacers, Daniels averaged 19.0 points and 16.4 rebounds.

=== Memphis Sounds (1974–1975) ===
In 1974–75, Daniels (along with Freddie Lewis) was traded to the Memphis Sounds for Charles Edge. Roger Brown joined them in Memphis as well. Early in the season, Daniels suffered pulled stomach muscles and missed a month. Then, he fell in a bathtub and injured his back, ending up back on injured list. His back problems were chronic. Daniels averaged 9.8 points and 9.0 rebounds.

"I was traded (to Memphis) with the understanding that we'd play together," Daniels recalled of his Memphis experience. "But Roger was traded to Utah and Freddie went to St. Louis. We were lied to. Then I hurt my back. Everything kind of fell apart. I never got my passion for the game back. Once you're lied to, you lose respect for the people who did it to you. You start doubting yourself a little bit. And your boys are gone."

In 1975–76, the Memphis Sounds relocated and became the Baltimore Claws. The Baltimore franchise was suddenly disbanded after three exhibition games due to financial difficulties. Daniels said at the time: "It just seems unbelievable. I've been around the ABA for nine years and felt this would be the most solid year and now this happens. We worked hard and wanted something good to happen with this team. The guys feel it is part of our lives that has been swooped away. We tried hard to keep it together by working real hard in practice even when we weren't getting paid. But now it's all over and we're all down in the dumps."

The Baltimore Claws players were then available to other ABA teams in a special draft. The 31-year-old Daniels was passed over in the resulting dispersal draft, as other teams were likely wary of assuming the contract he had with Baltimore. Daniels decided to retire from the league rather than play for another ABA team. He then played in Italy during the 1975–76 season.

After the 1976 ABA–NBA merger, the San Antonio Spurs, Denver Nuggets, New York Nets and Indiana Pacers merged with the NBA. The remaining ABA teams were disbanded. On October 19, 1976, Daniels signed as a free agent with the New York Nets and on December 13, 1976, he was waived by the Nets and retired. Daniels had played with the Nets for 11 games during the 1976–77 season. He also would appear on the Indiana Wizards' roster for the short-lived All-American Basketball Alliance in 1978, though he would never play in any official games for them properly.

=== Career totals ===
In the 1990 book Loose Balls by Terry Pluto, Daniels was quoted about his play: "I loved to knock guys down. When you went to the boards, you did it with your elbows out. If there was a fight, it wasn't just one-on-one, it was 12-on-12. The fine for fighting was $25. That wasn't going to stop any fights."

"Mel was the anchor," Pacers teammate and best friend Bob Netolicky said of Daniels. "Had Mel not came to this team, I can guarantee you 100 percent we wouldn't be sitting down at (Bankers Life Fieldhouse). Had we not had the success we had, they would’ve folded the team. The thing I hope people understand, they have no idea how important this guy was to the city (of Indianapolis)."

Daniels is the ABA's all-time leader with 9,494 rebounds and is second in ABA history with an average of 15.1 rebounds per game. He is fourth in ABA total points, with 11,739, ninth with 628 games, fourth with 22,340 minutes and 10th with 351 ABA blocked shots.

Overall, in his ABA and NBA career, Daniels averaged a double-double of 18.4 points and 14.9 rebounds in 639 career games. In 109 playoff games, he averaged 17.4 points and 14.9 rebounds.

== Coaching and front office career ==
After retiring as a player, Daniels joined the coaching staff of his college coach, Bob King, at Indiana State University. There he coached future Hall of Famer Larry Bird and helped the Sycamores reach the 1979 NCAA Final, where they were defeated by Magic Johnson and Michigan State ending an undefeated season.

After his tenure at Indiana State, Daniels joined the Indiana Pacers coaching staff in 1986. After seven seasons an assistant coach, he moved to scouting and eventually the front office and was the team's Director of Player Personnel until October 2009.

Daniels had a 0–2 record as interim coach of the Pacers in 1988–89. He replaced Jack Ramsay, who was fired after an 0–7 start. George Irvine and later Dick Versace were the head coaches who followed.

== ABA and NBA statistics ==
Legend
GP	Games played	GS	Games started	MPG	Minutes per game
FG%	Field goal percentage	3P%	3-point field goal percentage	FT%	Free throw percentage
RPG	Rebounds per game	APG	Assists per game	SPG	Steals per game
BPG	Blocks per game	PPG	Points per game	**Bold**	Career high

**Bold**	Denotes career highs

†	Denotes seasons in which Daniels's team won an ABA championship
*	Led the league
*	ABA record

=== Regular season ===
Year	Team	GP	GS	MPG	FG%	3P%	FT%	RPG	APG	SPG	BPG	PPG
1967–68	Minnesota (ABA)	78	–	37.7	.408	.200	.575	15.6*	1.4	–	–	22.2
1968–69	Indiana (ABA)	76	–	38.6	.476	.000	.604	16.5*	1.5	–	–	**24.0**
1969–70†	Indiana (ABA)	**83**	–	36.6	.473	.000	.675	17.6	1.6	–	–	18.7
1970–71	Indiana (ABA)	82	–	**38.7**	**.514**	.077	.679	**18.0***	**2.2**	–	–	21.0
1971–72†	Indiana (ABA)	79	–	37.6	.505	.000	.703	16.4	**2.2**	–	–	19.2
1972–73†	Indiana (ABA)	81	–	38.3	.482	**.250**	.722	15.4	**2.2**	–	**1.9**	18.5
1973–74	Indiana (ABA)	78	–	32.6	.440	–	**.756**	11.6	1.6	**0.7**	1.2	15.4
1974–75	Memphis (ABA)	71	–	23.2	.450	–	.634	9.0	1.8	0.6	1.4	9.8
1976–77	New York	11	–	11.5	.371	–	.565	3.1	0.5	0.3	1.0	3.5
Career		639	–	35.2	.468	.088	.657	14.9	1.8	0.6	1.5	18.4

=== Playoffs ===
Year	Team	GP	GS	MPG	FG%	3P%	FT%	RPG	APG	SPG	BPG	PPG
1968	Minnesota (ABA)	10	–	40.9	.434	–	.606	16.1	1.9	–	–	**25.3**
1969	Indiana (ABA)	17	–	33.5	.422	.000	.608	13.9	1.3	–	–	19.6
1970†	Indiana (ABA)	15	–	35.5	.444	.000	.667	17.7	1.0	–	–	19.3
1971	Indiana (ABA)	11	–	**41.5**	.485	–	.746	**19.2**	1.5	–	–	21.4
1972†	Indiana (ABA)	**20**	–	37.2	.480	.000	.753	15.1	1.4	–	–	15.3
1973†	Indiana (ABA)	18	–	35.3	.471	–	.765	13.8	**2.2**	–	–	15.9
1974	Indiana (ABA)	14	–	35.6	.401	–	**.767**	11.4	1.9	**0.8**	1.0	12.2
1975	Memphis (ABA)	4	–	13.5	**.500**	–	.556	6.0	0.3	0.3	**1.5**	6.8
Career		109	–	35.8	.449	.000	.683	14.8	1.5	0.7	1.1	17.4

=== College ===
Year	Team	GP	GS	MPG	FG%	3P%	FT%	RPG	APG	SPG	BPG	PPG
1964–65	New Mexico	**27**	–	–	**.486**	–	.610	11.2	–	–	–	17.3
1965–66	New Mexico	23	–	–	.485	–	**.738**	10.3	–	–	–	21.3
1966–67	New Mexico	**27**	–	–	.481	–	.686	**11.6**	–	–	–	**21.5**

== Head coaching record ==
=== NBA ===
Team	Year	G	W	L	W–L%	Finish	PG	PW	PL	PW–L%	Result
Indiana	1988–89	2	0	2	.000	interim	—	—	—	—	
Career		2	0	2	.000		—	—	—	—	

== Personal life ==
Daniels died on October 30, 2015, at the age of 71, from complications after heart surgery. He was survived by his wife, CeCe Daniels, son Mel Daniels Jr., two granddaughters, and two sisters.

A lover of horses, Daniels lived on a ranch in Sheridan, Indiana, at the time of his death.

Daniels was longtime friends with Ira Harge, a teammate at New Mexico and was very close with Bob Netolicky, his Pacers teammate.

Daniels appeared in 30 for 30 Winning Time: Reggie Miller vs. The New York Knicks (documentary, 2010), Magic vs. Bird: The 1979 NCAA Championship Game (TV special, 1979) and Undefeated: The Roger Brown Story (TV Movie, 2013).

A poet, Mel Daniels wrote more than 20,000 poems in his lifetime. His favorite poet was Edgar Allan Poe.

== Honors ==
- In 1978, Daniels was inducted into the New Mexico Sports Hall of Fame.
- Daniels's jersey (#34) was retired by the Indiana Pacers in 1985. He is one of four players (the others are teammate Roger Brown, Reggie Miller and teammate George McGinnis) to have his jersey retired by the Pacers.
- In 1997, Daniels was selected as a member of the ABA All-Time Team by a panel of ABA sports media, referees and executives.
- Daniels was inducted into the Naismith Memorial Basketball Hall of Fame in Springfield, Massachusetts, in 2012. He formally joined former ABA players Billy Cunningham (1986), Rick Barry (1987), Connie Hawkins (1992), Julius Erving (1993), Dan Issel (1993), George Gervin (1996), David Thompson (1996), Moses Malone (2001) and Artis Gilmore (2011) in the Hall on September 7, 2012.
