= Mervin Jackson =

American basketball player

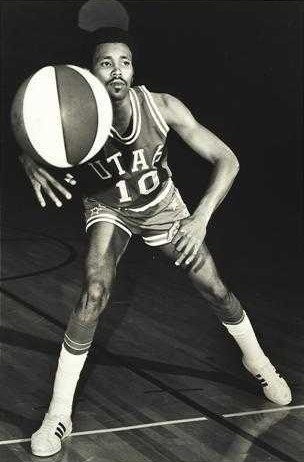

Personal information
- Born: August 15, 1946 Savannah, Georgia, U.S.
- Died: June 7, 2012 (aged 65) Chicago, Illinois, U.S.
- Listed height: 6 ft 3 in (1.91 m)
- Listed weight: 175 lb (79 kg)

Career information
- High school: Beach (Savannah, Georgia)
- College: Utah (1965–1968)
- NBA draft: 1968: 9th round, 120th overall pick
- Drafted by: Phoenix Suns
- Playing career: 1968–1973
- Position: Point guard
- Number: 10, 24

Career history
- 1968–1972: Los Angeles / Utah Stars
- 1972–1973: Memphis Tams

Career highlights
- ABA All-Star (1969); ABA champion (1971); First-team All-American – USBWA (1968); Third-team All-American – NABC (1968); 2× First-team All-WAC (1967, 1968)
- Stats at Basketball Reference

Mervin P. Jackson Jr. (August 15, 1946 – June 7, 2012) was an American professional basketball player.

Jackson was born in Savannah, Georgia and attended the University of Utah. A 6'3" guard, he played in the American Basketball Association from 1968 to 1973 as a member of the Los Angeles / Utah Stars and Memphis Tams. He won a league championship with Utah in 1971 and appeared in the 1969 ABA All-Star Game. In his ABA career, Jackson averaged 11.6 points per game.

Jackson was inducted into the Greater Savannah Athletic Hall of Fame in 1979. He died in June 2012.
