= Attorney General Barrett =

Attorney General Barrett may refer to:

- George F. Barrett (1907–1980), Attorney General of Illinois
- James E. Barrett (1922–2011), Attorney General of Wyoming

== See also ==
- Elizabeth Barrett-Anderson (born 1953), Attorney General of Guam
- General Barrett (disambiguation)
