= Michael Barrett (physician) =

Michael Barrett (16 May 1816 – 26 February 1887) was a medical doctor and teacher. He was born in London, England, received his early education at Caen, France and emigrated with his family to Upper Canada in 1833.

Barrett is best remembered for his role in the establishment of the Ontario Medical College for Women. Women were being denied admission to existing medical schools and an appeal to Barrett and other medical people by Augusta Stowe-Gullen resulted in the opening of the college in 1883. He received the appointment dean and also taught there until his death.
