= 1969 ABA All-Star Game =

Basketball exhibition game

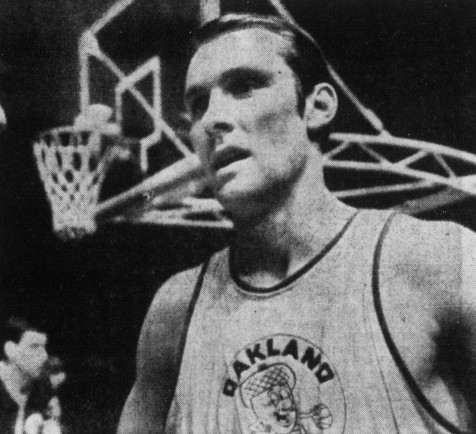
Rick Barry before the 1969 ABA All-Star Game in Louisville, Kentucky

The second American Basketball Association All-Star Game was played on January 28, 1969, at Louisville Convention Center in Louisville, Kentucky before an audience at 5,407, between teams from the Western Conference and the Eastern Conference. The West team won the game, with a score of 133–127.

== Team members and officials ==
Originally, Jim Harding of the Minnesota Pipers was to coach the East. However, he was removed as coach by ABA management after getting into a fight with Gabe Rubin, a trustee of the ABA and partial owner of the team. Gene Rhodes of the Kentucky Colonels was chosen to coach the East instead, while Alex Hannum of the Oakland Oaks coached the victorious West. In the previous year, Hannum had coached the NBA's West team to victory in the 1968 NBA All-Star Game, making him the first person to coach in an NBA and ABA All-Star Game.

John Beasley of the Dallas Chaparrals was named MVP of the game, with a 19-point and 14-rebound performance.

The officials were Andy Hershock and Ron Rakel.

=== Western Conference ===
Player, Team	MIN	FGM	FGA	3PM	3PA	FTM	FTA	REB	AST	PTS
John Beasley, DLC	29	8	12	0	0	3	3	14	2	19
Byron Beck, DNR	27	7	13	0	0	0	0	10	1	14
Doug Moe, OAK	26	6	13	0	0	5	8	6	6	17
Larry Jones, DNR	25	4	9	1	1	5	8	5	9	14
Larry Brown, OAK	25	1	7	0	1	3	5	0	7	5
Red Robbins, NOB	21	8	14	0	0	3	4	5	1	19
Warren Davis, LAS	20	3	8	0	0	0	0	7	2	6
Jimmy Jones, NOB	18	4	11	0	0	6	6	1	2	14
Willie Somerset, HSM	17	2	7	0	0	2	2	3	3	6
Rick Barry, OAK	12	3	9	0	0	4	5	3	1	10
Mervin Jackson, LAS	11	1	3	0	0	1	4	2	1	3
Wayne Hightower, DNR	9	1	2	0	0	4	4	5	0	6
Totals	240	48	108	1	2	36	46	61	35	133

=== Eastern Conference ===
Player, Team	MIN	FGM	FGA	3PM	3PA	FTM	FTA	REB	AST	PTS
Louie Dampier, KEN	38	5	14	1	4	3	3	2	6	14
Mel Daniels, IND	31	5	16	0	0	7	10	10	2	17
Donnie Freeman, MMF	27	7	13	0	0	7	7	6	7	21
Darel Carrier, KEN	26	5	12	1	4	8	10	4	5	19
Bob Netolicky, IND	26	5	9	0	0	3	5	12	1	13
Les Hunter, MMF	22	5	10	0	0	2	2	6	0	12
Walter Simon, NYN	21	8	11	0	0	2	3	4	1	18
Skip Thoren, MMF	17	1	4	0	0	0	0	5	2	2
Trooper Washington, MNP	15	2	5	0	0	2	2	5	1	6
Goose Ligon, KEN	12	0	2	0	0	3	4	3	0	3
Charles Williams, MNP	5	0	2	0	0	2	2	0	1	2
Connie Hawkins, MNP (injured)
Totals	240	43	98	2	8	39	48	57	26	127

== Progress of the game ==
The scoring was close, with each team winning two quarters. West was leading by 64–60 at halftime, and by 101–90 at the end of the third quarter.

Score by Periods	1	2	3	4	Final
West	38	26	37	32	133
East	33	27	30	37	127
