= Jim Ligon =

American basketball player (1944–2004)

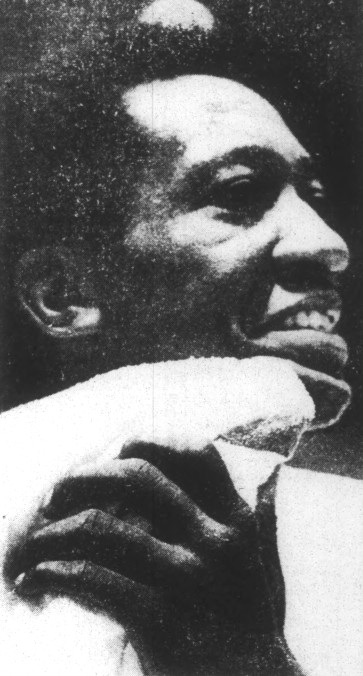
- Ligon, circa 1970

Personal information
- Born: February 22, 1944 Kokomo, Indiana, U.S.
- Died: April 17, 2004 (aged 60)
- Listed height: 6 ft 7 in (2.01 m)
- Listed weight: 210 lb (95 kg)

Career information
- High school: Kokomo (Kokomo, Indiana)
- NBA draft: 1966: undrafted
- Playing career: 1967–1974
- Position: Power forward / center
- Number: 22, 12

Career history
- 1967–1971: Kentucky Colonels
- 1971–1972: Pittsburgh Condors
- 1972–1974: Virginia Squires

Career highlights
- ABA All-Star (1969); First-team Parade All-American (1962)
- Stats at Basketball Reference

James Thomas "Goose" Ligon (February 22, 1944 – April 17, 2004) was an American professional basketball player.

A 6'7" forward/center, Ligon starred at Kokomo High School in Indiana but never played in college due to legal issues. He played for the Harlem Magicians during the 1962–63 season and then spent the next three years imprisoned in the Indiana Reformatory after being convicted of "assault and battery with intent to gratify sexual desires."

In 1967, he earned a spot with the Kentucky Colonels of the American Basketball Association and went on to have a seven-year ABA career with the Colonels, Pittsburgh Condors, and Virginia Squires. Ligon averaged 12.8 points per game and 10.9 rebounds per game in his ABA career and appeared in the 1969 ABA All-Star Game.

A ruptured Achilles tendon in the 1973–74 season ended Ligon's career. He worked 11 years with the Transit Authority of River City but was plagued by a cocaine addiction that went on for years. By 1997, it was reported that he was suffering from glaucoma. He died in 2004 at the age of 60.
