= Michael B. Barrett =

United States Army general

Michael B. Barrett (born c. 1946) is a former assistant professor of history at The Citadel, The Military College of South Carolina. He also served in the United States Army, and was promoted to brigadier general on February 12, 1999. He is a 1968 graduate of The Citadel, and joined the faculty in 1976. He earned his master's and Ph.D. degrees at the University of Massachusetts Amherst and focused on World War I. He retired from the Army in 2004 and from teaching in 2012.

He is the author of many articles and books, including Operation Albion: The German Conquest of the Baltic Islands, published in 2008, which has earned numerous awards.

While at The Citadel, Barrett served as dean of graduate studies from 1985 to 1990, chairman of the Faculty Council, and faculty advisor to the Honor Committee.

== Publications ==
- Barrett, Michael B. (2013). Prelude to Blitzkrieg: The 1916 Austro-German Campaign in Romania. Bloomington: Indiana University Press. ISBN 9780253008701. OCLC 858657475.
