= Mike Barrett (basketball) =

American basketball player

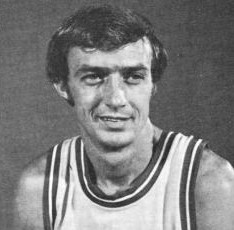

Personal information
- Born: September 5, 1943 Montgomery, West Virginia, U.S.
- Died: August 8, 2011 (aged 67) Nashville, Tennessee, U.S.
- Listed height: 6 ft 2 in (1.88 m)
- Listed weight: 155 lb (70 kg)

Career information
- High school: Richwood (Richwood, West Virginia)
- College: West Virginia Tech (1961–1965)
- NBA draft: 1965: undrafted
- Playing career: 1969–1973
- Position: Shooting guard / point guard
- Number: 20

Career history
- 1969–1971: Washington Caps / Virginia Squires
- 1972–1973: San Diego Conquistadors

Career highlights
- ABA All-Rookie First Team (1970)

Career ABA statistics
- Points: 2,500
- Rebounds: 592
- Assists: 730
- Stats at Basketball Reference
Medals
Men's basketball
Representing United States
Olympic Games
Gold medal – first place	1968 Mexico City	Team competition

Michael Thomas "Bird Man" Barrett (September 5, 1943 – August 8, 2011) was an American basketball player.

He was reared in Webster Springs, West Virginia and attended Webster Springs High School through his sophomore season. Prior to his Junior season, his father accepted a job in Richwood, West Virginia where he subsequently moved his family. Mike would then finish his Junior and Senior seasons at Richwood High School.

A 6'2" guard from West Virginia Institute of Technology, Barrett participated in the 1968 Summer Olympics, where he won a gold medal for the United States national basketball team. He also played for the United States men's national basketball team at the 1967 FIBA World Championship. From 1969 to 1973 he played professionally in the American Basketball Association as a member of the Washington Capitols, Virginia Squires, and San Diego Conquistadors. He was named to the 1970 ABA All-Rookie team, and averaged 13.4 points per game over his ABA career.

He was named West Virginia Amateur Athlete of the Year in 1968, and in 1980, he was inducted into the West Virginia Sports Hall of Fame.

Barrett died August 8, 2011, after a long illness.
