= Denver Nuggets accomplishments and records =

This page details the all-time statistics, records, and other achievements pertaining to the Denver Nuggets.

== Individual records ==
=== Franchise leaders ===
Bold denotes still active with team.

Italic denotes still active but not with team.

Points scored (regular season) (as of 2025–26 season)

1. Alex English (21,645)
2. **Nikola Jokić** (18,009)
3. Dan Issel (16,589)
4. Carmelo Anthony (13,970)
5. David Thompson (11,992)
6. **Jamal Murray** (11,528)
7. Ralph Simpson (10,130)
8. Byron Beck (8,602)
9. Fat Lever (8,081)
10. Mahmoud Abdul-Rauf (7,029)
11. Nenê (6,868)
12. Kiki VanDeWeghe (6,829)
13. Will Barton (6,695)
14. Antonio McDyess (6,555)
15. Dave Robisch (6,181)
16. Reggie Williams (5,934)
17. Ty Lawson (5,923)
18. Larry Jones (5,745)
19. Michael Porter Jr. (5,597)
20. Michael Adams (5,534)

==== Other statistics (regular season) ====
(as of 2025–26 season)

Most minutes played
Player	Minutes
Alex English	29,893
**Nikola Jokić**	25,914
Dan Issel	25,198
Carmelo Anthony	20,521
**Jamal Murray**	19,448
Byron Beck	19,197
T. R. Dunn	18,322
David Thompson	16,902
Fat Lever	16,867
Nenê	16,445

Most rebounds
Player	Rebounds
**Nikola Jokić**	8,977
Dan Issel	6,630
Byron Beck	5,261
Dikembe Mutombo	4,811
Alex English	4,686
Julius Keye	4,547
Marcus Camby	4,117
Nenê	3,859
Kenneth Faried	3,634
Fat Lever	3,621

Most assists
Player	Assists
**Nikola Jokić**	6,080
Alex English	3,679
Fat Lever	3,566
Andre Miller	2,978
Ty Lawson	2,745
**Jamal Murray**	3,044
Michael Adams	2,181
Nick Van Exel	2,047
Dan Issel	2,005
Ralph Simpson	1,950

Most steals
Player	Steals
Fat Lever	1,167
T. R. Dunn	1,070
**Nikola Jokić**	1,041
Alex English	854
Dan Issel	798
Nenê	694
Bobby Jones	660
Carmelo Anthony	634
Reggie Williams	632
**Jamal Murray**	608

Most blocks
Player	Blocks
Dikembe Mutombo	1,486
Marcus Camby	1,126
Wayne Cooper	830
Bobby Jones	625
Alex English	624
Chris Andersen	624
Antonio McDyess	604
**Nikola Jokić**	589
Raef LaFrentz	556
Nenê	508

Most three-pointers made
Player	3-pointers made
**Jamal Murray**	1,391
**Nikola Jokić**	926
Michael Porter Jr.	843
Will Barton	804
J. R. Smith	768
Michael Adams	630
Gary Harris	565
Wilson Chandler	540
Danilo Gallinari	535
Chauncey Billups	514

== Individual awards ==
=== NBA ===
NBA Most Valuable Player
- Nikola Jokić – 2021, 2022, 2024

NBA Conference Finals MVP

- Nikola Jokić – 2023

NBA Finals MVP

- Nikola Jokić – 2023

NBA Defensive Player of the Year

- Dikembe Mutombo – 1995
- Marcus Camby – 2007

NBA Most Improved Player of the Year

- Mahmoud Abdul-Rauf – 1993

NBA Coach of the Year

- Doug Moe – 1988
- George Karl – 2013

NBA Sportsmanship Award

- Chauncey Billups – 2009

J. Walter Kennedy Citizenship Award

- Dan Issel – 1985
- Alex English – 1988
- Kenneth Faried – 2013

NBA Executive of the Year

- Vince Boryla – 1985
- Mark Warkentien – 2009
- Masai Ujiri – 2013

All-NBA First Team

- David Thompson – 1977, 1978
- Nikola Jokić – 2019, 2021, 2022, 2024, 2025, 2026

All-NBA Second Team

- Alex English – 1982, 1983, 1986
- Lafayette Lever – 1987
- Carmelo Anthony – 2010
- Nikola Jokić – 2020, 2023

All-NBA Third Team

- Antonio McDyess – 1999
- Carmelo Anthony – 2006, 2007, 2009
- Chauncey Billups – 2009
- Jamal Murray – 2026

NBA All-Defensive First Team

- Bobby Jones – 1977, 1978
- Marcus Camby – 2007, 2008

NBA All-Defensive Second Team

- T.R. Dunn – 1983–1985
- Bill Hanzlik – 1986
- Lafayette Lever – 1988
- Dikembe Mutombo – 1995
- Marcus Camby – 2005, 2006

NBA All-Rookie First Team

- Dikembe Mutombo – 1992
- LaPhonso Ellis – 1993
- Antonio McDyess – 1996
- Nenê – 2003
- Carmelo Anthony – 2004
- Kenneth Faried – 2012
- Nikola Jokić – 2016

NBA All-Rookie Second Team

- Mahmoud Abdul-Rauf – 1991
- Mark Macon – 1992
- Jalen Rose – 1995
- Bobby Jackson – 1998
- James Posey – 2000
- Jusuf Nurkić – 2015
- Emmanuel Mudiay – 2016
- Jamal Murray – 2017
- Bones Hyland – 2022

=== NBA All-Star Weekend ===
NBA All-Star Game Selections

- Dan Issel – 1977
- Bobby Jones – 1977, 1978
- David Thompson – 1977, 1978, 1979
- George McGinnis – 1979
- Alex English – 1982, 1983, 1984, 1985, 1986, 1987, 1988, 1989
- Kiki Vandeweghe – 1983, 1984
- Calvin Natt – 1985
- Fat Lever – 1988, 1990
- Dikembe Mutombo – 1992, 1995, 1996
- Antonio McDyess – 2001
- Carmelo Anthony – 2007, 2008, 2010, 2011
- Allen Iverson – 2007, 2008
- Chauncey Billups – 2009, 2010
- Nikola Jokić – 2019, 2020, 2021, 2022, 2023, 2024, 2025, 2026
- Jamal Murray – 2026

NBA All-Star Game head coach

- Larry Brown – 1977
- George Karl – 2010
- Michael Malone – 2019, 2023

NBA All-Star Game Three-Point Contest

- Voshon Lenard – 2004 (winner), 2005

=== ABA ===
ABA Most Valuable Player Award

- Spencer Haywood – 1970

ABA Rookie of the Year Award

- Spencer Haywood – 1970
- David Thompson – 1976

ABA All-Star Game

- Ralph Simpson - 1972, 1973, 1974, 1975, 1976
- Larry Jones - 1968, 1969, 1970
- Byron Beck - 1969, 1976
- Warren Jabali - 1973, 1974
- Wayne Hightower - 1969
- Spencer Haywood - 1970
- Julius Keye - 1971
- Art Becker - 1972
- Mack Calvin - 1975
- Mike Green - 1975
- Dan Issel - 1976
- David Thompson - 1976
- Bobby Jones - 1976
- Claude Terry - 1976
- Chuck Williams - 1976
- Gus Gerard - 1976
- Monte Towe - 1976
- Roger Brown - 1976
- Jimmy Foster - 1976

ABA All-Star Game Most Valuable Player Award

- Spencer Haywood - 1970
- Warren Jabali - 1973
- David Thompson - 1976

ABA All-Star Game head coaches

- Larry Brown – 1975, 1976

ABA All-Time Team

- Mack Calvin
- Spencer Haywood
- Dan Issel
- Warren Jabali
- David Thompson

All-ABA First Team

- Larry Jones – 1968, 1969, 1970
- Spencer Haywood – 1970
- Warren Jabali – 1973
- Mack Calvin - 1975
- Ralph Simpson - 1976

All-ABA Second Team

- Larry Cannon – 1971
- Ralph Simpson - 1972, 1973
- Bobby Jones - 1976
- Dan Issel - 1976
- David Thompson - 1976

ABA All-Defensive Team

- Julius Keye – 1973, 1974
- Bobby Jones - 1975, 1976

ABA All-Rookie Team

- Walt Piatkowski – 1969
- Spencer Haywood – 1970
- Mike Green – 1974
- Bobby Jones – 1975
- David Thompson - 1976

== Franchise record for championships ==
Championships
Championships	Seasons
NBA Championships
1	2023
Conference Championships
1	2023
Division Championships
12	1970, 1975, 1977, 1978, 1985, 1988, 2006, 2009, 2010, 2019, 2020, 2023

== See also ==
- NBA records
