= 1972 ABA playoffs =

Basketball competition

Tournament details
- Dates: March 31 – May 20, 1972
- Season: 1971–72
- Teams: 8

Final positions
- Champions: Indiana Pacers (2nd title)
- Runners-up: New York Nets
- Semifinalists: Virginia Squires; Utah Stars

The 1972 ABA playoffs was the postseason tournament of the American Basketball Association's 1971–72 season. The tournament concluded with the Western Division champion Indiana Pacers defeating the Eastern Division champion New York Nets, four games to two in the 1972 ABA Finals.

== Notable events ==
The Kentucky Colonels, despite finishing the season with the best record in the history of the ABA (68–16, .810), winning 8 of 11 regular season games against the New York Nets and finishing 24 games ahead of the Nets in the regular season standings, lost their first round series to the Nets.

The Floridians played their final game on April 6, 1972, losing at home in their Eastern Division semifinal series to the Virginia Squires 115–106. The Squires swept the series 4 games to none behind rookie Julius Erving who grabbed at least seventeen rebounds in three of those four games. On June 13, 1972, the league bought the Floridians and disbanded the team.

The Indiana Pacers became the first team to win a second ABA championship.

Freddie Lewis of the Pacers was the Most Valuable Player of the ABA playoffs.

This was the first season in which two future NBA teams met for the ABA Championship. This only happened one other time in the league's history, during its final year in 1976 when the Denver Nuggets edged past the Colonels 4–3 to meet the Nets in the ABA championship series.

Five of the seven playoff series ended in final games in which the home team lost.

== Bracket ==
Division Semifinals
1	Utah Stars	4
3	Dallas Chaparrals	0
Western Division
4	Denver Rockets	3
2	Indiana Pacers	4
1	Kentucky Colonels	2
3	New York Nets	4
Eastern Division
4	The Floridians	0
2	Virginia Squires	4

Division Finals
1	Utah Stars	3
2	Indiana Pacers	4
3	New York Nets	4
2	Virginia Squires	3

ABA Finals
W2	Indiana Pacers	4
E3	New York Nets	2

== Division Semifinals ==
=== Western Division Semifinals ===
==== (1) Utah Stars vs. (3) Dallas Chaparrals ====
April 1

Box score

Dallas Chaparrals 96, Utah Stars 106
Scoring by quarter: 26–20, 21–28, 21–32, 28–26
Pts: Steve "Snapper" Jones 22; Rebs: George Johnson 11; Asts: George Johnson 5	Pts: Jimmy Jones 27; Rebs: Zelmo Beaty 17; Asts: Jones, Combs 5 each
Utah leads series, 1–0

Salt Palace, Salt Lake City, Utah
Attendance: 8,783

April 3

Box score

Dallas Chaparrals 107, Utah Stars 113
Scoring by quarter: 24–28, 36–26, 30–30, 17–29
Pts: Donnie Freeman 36; Rebs: Collis Jones 12; Asts: Joe Hamilton 5	Pts: Willie Wise 36; Rebs: Zelmo Beaty 14; Asts: Jimmy Jones 9
Utah leads series, 2–0

Salt Palace, Salt Lake City, Utah
Attendance: 9,121

April 5

Box score

Utah Stars 96, Dallas Chaparrals 89
Scoring by quarter: 26–17, 24–24, 20–23, 26–25
Pts: Willie Wise 25; Rebs: Willie Wise 16; Asts: Willie Wise 4	Pts: Donnie Freeman 21; Rebs: Rich Jones 12; Asts: Rich Jones 5
Utah leads series, 3–0

Moody Coliseum, University Park, Texas
Attendance: 4,076

April 7

Box score

Utah Stars 103, Dallas Chaparrals 99
Scoring by quarter: 26–25, 29–29, 25–18, 23–27
Pts: Ron Boone 21; Rebs: Willie Wise 16; Asts: Jimmy Jones 4	Pts: Donnie Freeman 30; Rebs: S. Jones, R. Jones 7 each Asts: Joe Hamilton 5
Utah wins series, 4–0

Moody Coliseum, University Park, Texas
Attendance: 3,918

==== (2) Indiana Pacers vs. (4) Denver Rockets ====
March 31

Box score

Denver Rockets 96, Indiana Pacers 102
Scoring by quarter: 25–20, 24–26, 23–30, 24–26
Pts: Ralph Simpson 26; Rebs: Dave Robisch 17; Asts: Larry Brown 4	Pts: Roger Brown 28; Rebs: Mel Daniels 18; Asts: Brown, Lewis 4 each
Indiana leads series, 1–0

Indiana State Fair Coliseum, Indianapolis, Indiana
Attendance: 6,103

April 1

Box score

Denver Rockets 106, Indiana Pacers 105
Scoring by quarter: 27–22, 30–33, 23–31, 26–19
Pts: Ralph Simpson 32; Rebs: Byron Beck 13; Asts: Ralph Simpson 4	Pts: Billy Keller 31; Rebs: George McGinnis 15; Asts: George McGinnis 8
Series tied 1–1

Indiana State Fair Coliseum, Indianapolis, Indiana
Attendance: 6,521

April 4

Box score

Indiana Pacers 122, Denver Rockets 120 (OT)
Scoring by quarter: 26–26, 35–23, 26–36, 23–25, Overtime: 12–10
Pts: Roger Brown 30; Rebs: Mel Daniels 19; Asts: Freddie Lewis 7	Pts: Ralph Simpson 33; Rebs: Julius Keye 19; Asts: Ralph Simpson 6
Indiana leads series, 2–1

Denver Auditorium Arena, Denver, Colorado
Attendance: 5,304

April 6

Box score

Indiana Pacers 96, Denver Rockets 112
Scoring by quarter: 24–30, 24–25, 22–24, 26–33
Pts: Freddie Lewis 33; Rebs: George McGinnis 16; Asts: Freddie Lewis 5	Pts: Simpson, Beck 28 each Rebs: Julius Keye 20; Asts: Larry Brown 7
Series tied, 2–2

Denver Auditorium Arena, Denver, Colorado
Attendance: 6,109

April 8

Box score

Denver Rockets 79, Indiana Pacers 91
Scoring by quarter: 19–24, 15–16, 22–30, 23–31
Pts: Ralph Simpson 19; Rebs: Julius Keye 17; Asts: Simpson, Keye 2 each	Pts: Billy Keller 25; Rebs: Mel Daniels 20; Asts: Roger Brown 5
Indiana leads series, 3–2

Indiana State Fair Coliseum, Indianapolis, Indiana
Attendance: 9,428

April 9

Box score

Indiana Pacers 99, Denver Rockets 106
Scoring by quarter: 18–24, 27–27, 25–30, 29–25
Pts: Mel Daniels 26; Rebs: Mel Daniels 23; Asts: Freddie Lewis 9	Pts: Byron Beck 24; Rebs: Julius Keye 18; Asts: Larry Brown 8
Series tied, 3–3

Denver Auditorium Arena, Denver, Colorado
Attendance: 5,815

April 13

Box score

Denver Rockets 89, Indiana Pacers 91
Scoring by quarter: 21–22, 25–22, 20–31, 23–16
Pts: Ralph Simpson 30; Rebs: Julius Keye 18; Asts: Larry Brown 7	Pts: Brown, Lewis 20 each Rebs: Mel Daniels 20; Asts: Roger Brown 7
Indiana wins series, 4–3

Indiana State Fair Coliseum, Indianapolis, Indiana
Attendance: 8,643

=== Eastern Division Semifinals ===
==== (1) Kentucky Colonels vs. (3) New York Nets ====
April 1

Box score

New York Nets 122, Kentucky Colonels 108
Scoring by quarter: 23–23, 31–29, 36–24, 32–32
Pts: Rick Barry 50; Rebs: Billy Paultz 16; Asts: John Roche 8	Pts: Artis Gilmore 30; Rebs: Artis Gilmore 18; Asts: Louie Dampier 8
New York leads series, 1–0

Freedom Hall, Louisville, Kentucky
Attendance: 4,772

With his 50-point performance, Barry became the first and only ABA player to score 50 points in multiple postseason games.

April 4

Box score

New York Nets 105, Kentucky Colonels 90
Scoring by quarter: 26–17, 26–17, 28–29, 25–27
Pts: Rick Barry 35; Rebs: Billy Paultz 16; Asts: Washington, Roche 7 each	Pts: Dan Issel 22; Rebs: Artis Gilmore 16; Asts: Gilmore, Dampier 5 each
New York leads series, 2–0

Freedom Hall, Louisville, Kentucky
Attendance: 8,212

April 5

Box score

Kentucky Colonels 105, New York Nets 99
Scoring by quarter: 23–31, 30–19, 33–26, 19–23
Pts: Gilmore, Simon 25; Rebs: Artis Gilmore 22; Asts: Louie Dampier 6	Pts: Rick Barry 39; Rebs: Billy Paultz 14; Asts: John Roche 6
New York leads series, 2–1

Nassau Veterans Memorial Coliseum, Uniondale, New York
Attendance: 14,056

April 7

Box score

Kentucky Colonels 92, New York Nets 100
Scoring by quarter: 22–30, 28–16, 23–25, 19–29
Pts: Dan Issel 28; Rebs: Artis Gilmore 13; Asts: Louie Dampier 6	Pts: John Roche 38; Rebs: Billy Paultz 17; Asts: Washington, Roche 5 each
New York leads series, 3–1

Nassau Veterans Memorial Coliseum, Uniondale, New York
Attendance: 14,091

April 8

Box score

New York Nets 93, Kentucky Colonels 109
Scoring by quarter: 17–22, 20–22, 27–33, 29–32
Pts: John Roche 26; Rebs: Billy Paultz 11; Asts: John Roche 9	Pts: Dan Issel 24; Rebs: Artis Gilmore 19; Asts: Louie Dampier 16
New York leads series, 3–2

Freedom Hall, Louisville, Kentucky
Attendance: 7,949

April 10

Box score

Kentucky Colonels 96, New York Nets 101
Scoring by quarter: 24–26, 24–31, 28–23, 20–21
Pts: Artis Gilmore 24; Rebs: Artis Gilmore 18; Asts: Louie Dampier 4	Pts: John Roche 32; Rebs: Billy Paultz 19; Asts: Ollie Taylor 8
New York wins series, 4–2

Nassau Veterans Memorial Coliseum, Uniondale, New York
Attendance: 11,533

==== (2) Virginia Squires vs. (4) The Floridians ====
March 31

Box score

The Floridians 107, Virginia Squires 114 (OT)
Scoring by quarter: 24–26, 29–26, 20–23, 26–24, Overtime: 8–15
Pts: Jabali, Long 22 each Rebs: Jabali, Long 17 each Asts: Warren Jabali 7	Pts: Julius Erving 32; Rebs: Julius Erving 19; Asts: Julius Erving 8
Virginia leads series, 1–0

Norfolk Scope, Norfolk, Virginia
Attendance: 3,770

April 1

Box score

The Floridians 100, Virginia Squires 125
Scoring by quarter: 19–26, 25–33, 30–36, 26–30
Pts: Willie Long 22; Rebs: Warren Jabali 13; Asts: Long, Tucker, Calvin 3 each	Pts: Julius Erving 27; Rebs: Julius Erving 17; Asts: Julius Erving 7
Virginia leads series, 2–0

Hampton Coliseum, Hampton, Virginia
Attendance: 2,921

April 4

Box score

Virginia Squires 118, The Floridians 113
Scoring by quarter: 31–34, 30–29, 30–25, 27–25
Pts: Julius Erving 53; Rebs: Julius Erving 14; Asts: Julius Erving 6	Pts: Mack Calvin 27; Rebs: Jabali, Raymond 12 each Asts: Jabali, Calvin 8 each
Virginia leads series, 3–0

Miami-Dade Junior College North, Miami, Florida
Attendance: 2,965

Due to prior bookings, the Floridians played their playoff games at the north campus of Miami-Dade Junior College. Julius Erving tied the playoff record for points scored in an ABA playoff game with 53. Irving iced the game with two late free throws that gave them a four-point lead.

April 6

Box score

Virginia Squires 115, The Floridians 106
Scoring by quarter: 28–31, 29–21, 29–21, 29–33
Pts: Julius Erving 39; Rebs: Julius Erving 27; Asts: Erving, Taylor 5 each	Pts: Mack Calvin 23; Rebs: Ron Franz 11; Asts: Mack Calvin 10
Virginia wins series, 4–0

Miami-Dade Junior College North, Miami, Florida
Attendance: 3,117

With reports that loomed about the dissolving of The Floridians, the Squires dominated the second and third quarters to win the series. This was the last game played by The Floridians, as the team elected to fold in the offseason rather than relocate (rumors had indicated the possibility of playing in Cincinnati) or play further.

== Division Finals ==
=== Western Division Finals ===
==== (1) Utah Stars vs. (2) Indiana Pacers ====
April 15

Box score

Indiana Pacers 100, Utah Stars 108
Scoring by quarter: 28–23, 28–35, 25–24, 19–26
Pts: George McGinnis 31; Rebs: Mel Daniels 17; Asts: George McGinnis 6	Pts: Jimmy Jones 25; Rebs: Red Robbins 16; Asts: Jimmy Jones 8
Utah leads series, 1–0

Salt Palace, Salt Lake City, Utah
Attendance: 9,854

April 17

Box score

Indiana Pacers 109, Utah Stars 117
Scoring by quarter: 27–25, 28–29, 24–34, 30–29
Pts: George McGinnis 28; Rebs: George McGinnis 20; Asts: McGinnis, Brown 7 each	Pts: Willie Wise 30; Rebs: Zelmo Beaty 25; Asts: Jimmy Jones 10
Utah leads series, 2–0

Salt Palace, Salt Lake City, Utah
Attendance: 11,780

April 19

Box score

Utah Stars 111, Indiana Pacers 116
Scoring by quarter: 24–28, 26–23, 26–32, 35–33
Pts: Willie Wise 19; Rebs: Zelmo Beaty 12; Asts: Boone, Jackson 5 each	Pts: Roger Brown 30; Rebs: Mel Daniels 19; Asts: Brown, Lewis 5 each
Utah leads series, 2–1

Anderson High School Wigwam, Anderson, Indiana
Attendance: 7,489

April 22

Box score

Utah Stars 108, Indiana Pacers 118
Scoring by quarter: 26–24, 29–30, 31–36, 22–28
Pts: Jimmy Jones 26; Rebs: Willie Wise 15; Asts: Jimmy Jones 6	Pts: Roger Brown 27; Rebs: McGinnis, Daniels 13 each Asts: Billy Keller 8
Series tied, 2–2

Assembly Hall, Bloomington, Indiana
Attendance: 13,007

April 24

Box score

Indiana Pacers 130, Utah Stars 139
Scoring by quarter: 33–40, 28–38, 28–36, 41–25
Pts: Mel Daniels 29; Rebs: Mel Daniels 17; Asts: Billy Keller 11	Pts: Willie Wise 34; Rebs: Willie Wise 13; Asts: Jimmy Jones 11
Utah leads series, 3–2

Salt Palace, Salt Lake City, Utah
Attendance: 12,526

April 26

Box score

Utah Stars 99, Indiana Pacers 105
Scoring by quarter: 31–26, 24–27, 23–27, 21–25
Pts: Willie Wise 30; Rebs: Zelmo Beaty 13; Asts: Jimmy Jones 7	Pts: Mel Daniels 20; Rebs: Mel Daniels 18; Asts: Roger Brown 4
Series tied, 3–3

Assembly Hall, Bloomington, Indiana
Attendance: 8,103

May 1

Box score

Indiana Pacers 117, Utah Stars 113
Scoring by quarter: 30–29, 29–26, 32–30, 26–28
Pts: Roger Brown 27; Rebs: Mel Daniels 15; Asts: Freddie Lewis 6	Pts: Willie Wise 26; Rebs: Wise, Beaty 11 each Asts: Willie Wise 7
Indiana wins series, 4–3

Salt Palace, Salt Lake City, Utah
Attendance: 12,724

=== Eastern Division Finals ===
==== (2) Virginia Squires vs. (3) New York Nets ====
April 13

Box score

New York Nets 91, Virginia Squires 138
Scoring by quarter: 22–28, 13–34, 24–42, 32–34
Pts: John Roche 26; Rebs: Billy Paultz 15; Asts: John Roche 3	Pts: Julius Erving 26; Rebs: Julius Erving 20; Asts: Julius Erving 15
Virginia leads series, 1–0

Richmond Coliseum, Richmond, Virginia
Attendance: 5,526

April 15

Box score

New York Nets 106, Virginia Squires 115
Scoring by quarter: 30–28, 25–31, 26–30, 25–26
Pts: Rick Barry 29; Rebs: Billy Paultz 14; Asts: Ollie Taylor 7	Pts: Julius Erving 38; Rebs: Julius Erving 20; Asts: Julius Erving 7
Virginia leads series, 2–0

Norfolk Scope, Norfolk, Virginia
Attendance: 10,410

April 24

Box score

Virginia Squires 117, New York Nets 119
Scoring by quarter: 33–37, 34–31, 26–27, 24–24
Pts: Julius Erving 31; Rebs: Julius Erving 22; Asts: Erving, Eakins, Moe 5 each	Pts: Roche, Barry 25 each Rebs: Billy Paultz 14; Asts: Barry, Melchionni, Roche 5 each
Virginia leads series, 2–1

Nassau Veterans Memorial Coliseum, Uniondale, New York
Attendance: 11,893

Game 3 occurred nine days after Game 2 due to the Coliseum being booked for several days (the ABA refused to have the games played at the Island Garden).

April 26

Box score

Virginia Squires 107, New York Nets 118
Scoring by quarter: 22–31, 30–32, 25–29, 30–26
Pts: Julius Erving 27; Rebs: Julius Erving 23; Asts: Fatty Taylor 5	Pts: Rick Barry 33; Rebs: Billy Paultz 12; Asts: Bill Melchionni 8
Series tied, 2–2

Nassau Veterans Memorial Coliseum, Uniondale, New York
Attendance: 11,164

April 29

Box score

New York Nets 107, Virginia Squires 116
Scoring by quarter: 28–26, 23–33, 26–29, 30–28
Pts: Rick Barry 34; Rebs: Billy Paultz 16; Asts: Bill Melchionni 5	Pts: Ray Scott 26; Rebs: Julius Erving 32; Asts: Julius Erving 8
Virginia leads series, 3–2

Hampton Coliseum, Hampton, Virginia
Attendance: 6,309

May 1

Box score

Virginia Squires 146, New York Nets 136
Scoring by quarter: 32–36, 27–37, 31–28, 46–45
Pts: Julius Erving 34; Rebs: Julius Erving 10; Asts: Julius Erving 7	Pts: Rick Barry 43; Rebs: Billy Paultz 14; Asts: Bill Melchionni 9
Series tied, 3–3

Nassau Veterans Memorial Coliseum, Uniondale, New York
Attendance: 11,152

May 4

Box score

New York Nets 94, Virginia Squires 88
Scoring by quarter: 23–21, 25–23, 27–27, 19–17
Pts: Rick Barry 27; Rebs: Billy Paultz 24; Asts: Bill Melchionni 7	Pts: Julius Erving 35; Rebs: Julius Erving 20; Asts: Fatty Taylor 5
New York wins series, 4–3

Norfolk Scope, Norfolk, Virginia
Attendance: 10,410

== ABA Finals: (E3) New York Nets vs. (W2) Indiana Pacers ==
May 6

Box score

New York Nets 103, Indiana Pacers 124
Scoring by quarter: 25–31, 31–22, 22–35, 25–36
Pts: Rick Barry 34; Rebs: Billy Paultz 13; Asts: Melchionni, Roche 5 each	Pts: Freddie Lewis 33; Rebs: George McGinnis 22; Asts: Billy Keller 4
Indiana leads series, 1–0

Assembly Hall, Bloomington, Indiana
Attendance: 7,483

The two teams battled to a tough first half that saw New York lead by one point (56–55) at the half, but the Pacers took control late in the third quarter. The two teams were tied at 74 with five minutes remaining in the third quarter before Freddie Lewis started a rally for the Pacers with a three-point shot that was followed by made shots by Mel Daniels and company before Rick Mount made it 88–78 before the quarter ended with his made shot. The Pacers held on from there as Lewis led the Pacers in scoring with 33.

May 9

Box score

New York Nets 117, Indiana Pacers 115
Scoring by quarter: 27–27, 32–28, 34–28, 24–32
Pts: Rick Barry 29; Rebs: Billy Paultz 15; Asts: Bill Melchionni 7	Pts: McGinnis, Brown 22 each Rebs: George McGinnis 11; Asts: Billy Keller 6
Series tied, 1–1

Indiana State Fair Coliseum, Indianapolis, Indiana
Attendance: 10,079

This was the first home game played by the Pacers at the Coliseum in 26 days, as the venue had hosted circus and tennis events since the Pacers had won the First Round series. Bill Melchionni, fresh from recovering from a broken bone in his hand that had knocked him out until midway through the second round of the playoffs, contributed 26 points as the Nets withstood a late rally. The Nets led at halftime and were dominating the second half, even leading 114–99 with under five minutes to play before the Pacers scored sixteen straight points to actually take a one-point lead with 1:40 to go. Both teams kept missing shots down the line, with Rick Mount missing a quick shot after taking the rebound that saw the Nets quickly recover it and get it to Rick Barry, who scored from 14 feet out to give the Nets the lead with 27 seconds remaining. The Pacers then went down the court and missed before Barry was then fouled with little time to go. Barry made just one free throw before the Pacers got a last-second chance in the midcourt, where Mel Daniels missed a turnaround jumper that skidded off the rim that gave the Nets the victory.

May 12

Box score

Indiana Pacers 114, New York Nets 108
Scoring by quarter: 29–29, 25–23, 36–32, 24–24
Pts: George McGinnis 30; Rebs: George McGinnis 20; Asts: Freddie Lewis 7	Pts: Rick Barry 44; Rebs: Trooper Washington 15; Asts: Bill Melchionni 7
Indiana leads series, 2–1

Nassau Veterans Memorial Coliseum, Uniondale, New York
Attendance: 15,241

The efforts of rookie George McGinnis in Game 3 led Nets coach Lou Carnesecca to call him a "champion" type of heavy-weight contender. McGinnis (nursing a jammed finger on his left hand) scored 30 points and led the game in rebounds with 20, with nine of his points being in the first five minutes of the third quarter that saw Indiana take permanent control of the lead. Rick Barry led the game in scoring for the Nets with 44 (24 in the first half), but he went 8-of-13 from the free throw line despite leading the league in the category, while his teammate John Roche went 1-of-7 from the line.

May 15

Box score

Indiana Pacers 105, New York Nets 110
Scoring by quarter: 24–31, 35–23, 25–24, 21–32
Pts: Freddie Lewis 22; Rebs: George McGinnis 16; Asts: Freddie Lewis 7	Pts: Billy Paultz 30; Rebs: Billy Paultz 18; Asts: Rick Barry 9
Series tied, 2–2

Nassau Veterans Memorial Coliseum, Uniondale, New York
Attendance: 15,870

Billy Paultz took control for the Nets, scoring 18 rebounds and 30 points while Rick Barry led the way in nine assists to go with 26 points as the aggressive defense of the Nets limited the Pacers to having no scorer with more than 23 points. Ollie Taylor gave New York the lead for good with his driving shot with just eight minutes to go in the game.

May 18

Box score

New York Nets 99, Indiana Pacers 100
Scoring by quarter: 33–15, 19–22, 20–34, 27–29
Pts: Rick Barry 33; Rebs: Billy Paultz 15; Asts: John Roche 5	Pts: Lewis, Keller 22 each Rebs: George McGinnis 14; Asts: Billy Keller 8
Indiana leads series, 3–2

Indiana State Fair Coliseum, Indianapolis, Indiana
Attendance: 10,079
Referees: John Vanak, Mark Schafman

The Nets took advantage of poor shooting from Indiana to lead 33–15 and rode it to a 15-point halftime lead. However, the Pacers went on a 17–4 run to narrow the deficit in a matter of under four minutes. The Nets led by four with 27 seconds to go with Rick Barry making free throws, but Billy Keller hit a three-pointer (his fourth of the game) to narrow it to one with :17 to go. The Pacers got the ball back and free throws with Freddie Lewis managing to make two of them to give Indiana the lead with nine seconds to go. The Nets saw their inbound pass go through Barry's hands as Indiana clinched the victory.

May 20

Box score

Indiana Pacers 108, New York Nets 105
Scoring by quarter: 28–28, 28–28, 32–24, 20–25
Pts: Roger Brown 32; Rebs: Mel Daniels 12; Asts: Billy Keller 7	Pts: Melchionni, Barry 23 each Rebs: Billy Paultz 14; Asts: Melchionni, Barry 7 each
Indiana wins series, 4–2

Nassau Veterans Memorial Coliseum, Uniondale, New York
Attendance: 10,434

Roger Brown contributed a game-high 32 points as the Pacers rode an energetic third quarter that turned a tied game at halftime to a lead of 11 at one point. The two teams were tied at halftime because Indiana went on a 21–9 run in the last seven minutes in the first half. The Pacers led by nine with less than six minutes to go before they had to hold off the Nets narrowing it late, with Brown scoring a three-pointer to give Indiana a seven-point lead with a minute to go. Bill Melchionni tried a desperation three-pointer with time expiring that just missed the basket. The Pacers became the first ABA team to win multiple championships.

Less than a month later, a series of events led to Rick Barry never playing for the Nets again. On June 23, 1972, a United States District Court judge issued a preliminary injunction to prohibit Barry from playing for any team other than the Golden State Warriors after his contract with the Nets ended, due to a 5-year contract signed in 1969. On October 6, 1972, the Nets released Barry and he returned to the Warriors.

Three members of the Pacers eventually made the Naismith Basketball Hall of Fame: Mel Daniels (2012), Roger Brown (2013), George McGinnis (2017), to go along with Rick Barry for the Nets (1987) while both head coaches from the series in Lou Carnesecca (1992) and Bobby Leonard (2014) also were later inducted.

== Statistical leaders ==
Category	Total			Average			
Category	Player	Team	Total	Player	Team	Avg.	Games played
Points	Rick Barry	New York Nets	554	Julius Erving	Virginia Squires	33.3	11
Rebounds	Mel Daniels	Indiana Pacers	302	Julius Erving	Virginia Squires	20.4	11
Assists	Freddie Lewis	Indiana Pacers	87	Louie Dampier	Kentucky Colonels	7.5	6

=== Total leaders ===
Points

1. Rick Barry - 554
2. John Roche - 425
3. Roger Brown - 409
4. Freddie Lewis - 383
5. Julius Erving - 366

Rebounds

1. Mel Daniels - 302
2. Billy Paultz - 288
3. George McGinnis - 227
4. Julius Erving - 224
5. Trooper Washington - 173

Assists

1. Freddie Lewis - 87
2. John Roche - 84
3. Billy Keller - 84
4. Roger Brown - 81
5. Julius Erving - 72

Minutes

1. Roger Brown - 845
2. Billy Paultz - 809
3. Freddie Lewis - 805
4. John Roche - 763
5. Rick Barry - 749
