= 1973 ABA All-Star Game =

Exhibition basketball game

The sixth American Basketball Association All-Star Game was played February 6, 1973 at Salt Palace in Salt Lake City, Utah before an audience at 12,556. Larry Brown of the Carolina Cougars coached the East, with LaDell Andersen of the Utah Stars coached the West. Warren Jabali of the Denver Rockets was named MVP.

Score by Periods:	1	2	3	4	Final
West	28	24	32	39	123
East	28	37	27	19	111

== Western Conference ==
Player, Team	MIN	FGM	FGA	3PM	3PA	FTM	FTA	REB	AST	STL	BLK	PFS	PTS
Willie Wise, UTS	37	11	20	0	0	4	4	6	4	0	0	3	26
Jimmy Jones, UTS	36	6	10	0	2	2	2	5	4	1	0	2	14
George McGinnis, IND	34	10	15	0	1	3	6	15	2	1	1	5	23
Mel Daniels, IND	33	8	19	0	0	9	12	11	1	0	2	3	25
Warren Jabali, DNR	31	7	12	1	1	1	3	4	7	3	0	2	16
Chuck Williams, SDC	16	2	3	0	0	1	3	0	2	0	0	2	5
Zelmo Beaty, UTS	15	3	6	0	0	0	0	4	1	1	2	1	6
Rich Jones, DLC	14	0	8	0	0	0	0	4	1	0	0	1	0
Ralph Simpson, DNR	13	2	6	0	0	2	3	3	2	1	0	1	6
Stew Johnson, SDC	11	1	3	0	0	0	0	1	0	0	0	2	2
Totals	240	50	102	1	4	22	33	53	24	7	5	22	123

== Eastern Conference ==
Player, Team	MIN	FGM	FGA	3PM	3PA	FTM	FTA	REB	AST	STL	BLK	PFS	PTS
Artis Gilmore, KEN	31	3	8	0	0	4	8	16	0	0	2	5	10
Julius Erving, VIR	30	8	16	0	0	6	8	5	1	0	1	4	22
Dan Issel, KEN	29	6	14	0	0	2	2	7	4	0	0	0	14
Bill Melchionni, NYN	24	1	6	0	0	2	2	8	2	1	0	1	4
Mack Calvin, CAR	23	3	8	0	0	7	7	2	8	1	0	5	13
Louie Dampier, KEN	23	5	13	0	1	0	0	1	0	0	0	3	10
Joe Caldwell, CAR	23	3	5	0	0	1	1	5	2	1	1	2	7
George Thompson, MMT	22	4	10	0	0	2	2	1	0	0	0	1	10
Billy Cunningham, CAR	20	9	12	0	1	0	0	6	4	1	0	6	18
Billy Paultz, NYN	15	1	3	0	0	1	1	5	3	0	0	2	3
Totals	240	43	95	0	2	25	31	56	24	4	4	29	111

- Halftime — East, 65–52
- Third Quarter — East, 92–84
- Officials: Norm Drucker and Ed Middleton
- Attendance: 12,556
