= Stew Johnson =

American basketball player (born 1944)

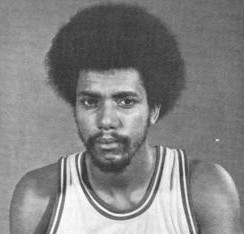
- Johnson in 1972

Personal information
- Born: August 19, 1944 (age 82) New York City, New York, U.S.
- Listed height: 6 ft 8 in (2.03 m)
- Listed weight: 220 lb (100 kg)

Career information
- High school: Clairton (Clairton, Pennsylvania)
- College: Murray State (1963–1966)
- NBA draft: 1966: 3rd round, 21st overall pick
- Drafted by: New York Knicks
- Playing career: 1966–198?
- Position: Power forward / center
- Number: 24, 41, 10, 20, 13, 7, 11, 2, 23

Career history

Playing
- 196?: Benton Harbor/Twin City Sailors
- 1966–1967: Holland Carvers
- 1967: Kentucky Colonels
- 1967–1968: New Jersey Americans / New York Nets
- 1968–1969: Houston Mavericks
- 1969–1971: Pittsburgh Pipers / Condors
- 1971–1972: Carolina Cougars
- 1972–1974: San Diego Conquistadors
- 1974–1975: Memphis Sounds
- 1975: San Diego Sails
- 1975–1976: San Antonio Spurs
- 1976–1977: SP Federale Lugano
- 1978: Indiana Wizards
- 1978–1979: Ármann
- 1979–1981: River Plate
- 1981–1983: KR Basket

Coaching
- 1978–1979: Ármann (men's)
- 1981–1983: KR Basket (men's)
- 1981–1983: KR Basket (women's)

Career highlights
- As player: 3× ABA All-Star (1973–1975); Swiss League champion (1977); Swiss League scoring champion (1977); Úrvalsdeild scoring champion (1983); 2× All-OVC team; As head coach: 2× Icelandic Women's League champion (1982, 1983); 2× Icelandic Women's Cup winner (1982, 1983)

Career ABA statistics
- Points: 10,538 (16.3 ppg)
- Rebounds: 4,263 (6.6 rpg)
- Assists: 984 (1.5 apg)
- Stats at Basketball Reference

Stewart Johnson (born August 19, 1944) is an American former professional basketball player. A 6-foot-8-inch (2.03 m) tall power forward/center from Murray State University, who was born in New York City, Johnson was selected by the New York Knicks in the third round of the 1966 NBA draft. However, Johnson never played in the NBA, joining the rival American Basketball Association instead.

== College career ==
Johnson broke the color barrier as the first black varsity basketball player for a four-year program in the southeastern United States (not including historically black colleges and universities), as he suited up for Murray State University of the Ohio Valley Conference in 1963.

In his three seasons of varsity basketball at Murray State, he played in 76 games and averaged 16.8 points averaged 12.9 rebounds while shooting for a .417 field goal percentage and a .731 free throw percentage. He scored a total of 1,275 points in his career.

A two-time All-OVC selection, Johnson averaged 20.0 points and 14.1 rebounds as a junior, as his rebounding average ranked second in conference statistics. Johnson was a regular on three consecutive winning Racer teams, as he helped Murray State to an OVC championship in 1963–64. He served as team co-captain his senior season. He is a member of the Murray State Athletics Hall of Fame, inducted in 1979.

== Playing career ==
=== NABL ===
Johnson spent the 1966–67 season in the North American Basketball League with Benton Harbor/Twin City Sailors and the Holland Carvers. On 21 January 1967, he scored 30 points and grabbed 20 rebounds for the Carvers in a loss against the Sailors.

=== ABA ===
Johnson played nine seasons (1967–1976) in the ABA with seven different franchises: the Kentucky Colonels (1967), New Jersey Americans / New York Nets (1967–69), Houston Mavericks (1968–69), Pittsburgh Pipers / Condors (1969–1971), Carolina Cougars (1971–72), San Diego Conquistadors (1972–1974), Memphis Sounds (1974–75), Baltimore Claws (1975–76, who played only 3 preseason games), San Diego Sails (1975) and San Antonio Spurs (1975–76)

In his ABA career Johnson scored 10,538 career points. He was known for his sweet shooting stroke. He had the ability to drain long jumpers and had range out to the three-point arc. He filled in admirably at center for the '71–'72 Cougar team after Jim McDaniels ignored his contract with the Cougars and jumped to the Seattle SuperSonics. He also made three ABA All-Star Game appearances (1973, 1974 and 1975), twice as a member of the San Diego Conquistadors and once as a member of the Memphis Sounds. He set the ABA single-game scoring record when he erupted for 62 points against The Floridians on March 6, 1971; his record lasted almost a year until Zelmo Beaty scored 63 points against the Pittsburgh Condors on February 21, 1972.

Johnson made the playoffs in three straight years from 1973 to 1975, scoring 238 points in 15 games.

His 10,538 points are 9th all time in ABA history, behind only Louie Dampier, Dan Issel, Ron Boone, Mel Daniels, Julius Erving, Freddie Lewis, Donnie Freeman, and Mack Calvin, with four of them being in the Naismith Memorial Basketball Hall of Fame. Johnson finished 2nd all time in field goal attempts (10,854), 5th in field goals made (4,586), 7th in games played (647), 1st in turnover percentage (8.68%) 12th in minutes played (19,201), but also 2nd in field goals missed (6,268).

=== AABA ===
In January 1978, Johnson joined the Indiana Wizards of the All-American Basketball Alliance league. The league folded in February, less than a month after it started. In 8 games, Johnson scored 117 points for an average of 14.6 points per game.

=== Iceland ===
In 1978 Johnson joined Icelandic Division I club Ármann as player-coach. In December of that year, Johnson was assaulted in a nightclub where a glass was thrown at his face, severely injuring his right eye. He recovered enough to return to the floor before the season ended but the club was unable to achieve promotion to the Úrvalsdeild.

After spending the next two seasons with River Plate in Argentine, Johnson returned to Iceland in 1981 and joined KR as player-coach. He led the Úrvalsdeild in scoring in 1983 while finishing second in 1982. His Icelandic career came to an end in 1983 when foreign players where barred from playing in the Icelandic leagues.

Johnson also coached KR's women's team for two seasons and led them to both the national championship and Icelandic Basketball Cup in 1982 and 1983.

=== Sweden ===
After his career in Iceland came to an end, he played and coached in Sweden for several years.

== Personal life ==
Johnson was married three times and has six children, including Swedish national basketball team player Precious Johnson.
