= ABA All-Star Game =

Professional basketball league founded in 1967

The American Basketball Association (ABA) was a professional basketball league founded in 1967. The ABA ceased to exist after merging with the National Basketball Association (NBA) in 1976. In total, the league held nine all-star games, with all but the last being between the Western Division and the Eastern Division. In the final one, it was held between the first place team at the time of the All-Star break face off against a selected group of All-Stars, regardless of conference.

There was one noted exception to the rule in having the best coaches of the break be the head coach. The 1969 All-Star Game was to have Jim Harding of the leading Minnesota Pipers to coach the East. However, he was removed as coach by ABA management after getting into a fight with Gabe Rubin, a trustee of the ABA and partial owner of the team. Gene Rhodes of the Kentucky Colonels was chosen to coach the East instead.

Alex Hannum, Larry Brown, and Bill Sharman are the only people to have coached in both the NBA and ABA All-Star Game. Brown, a three-time All-Star player, is the only person to have participated in the ABA All-Star Game as player and coach.

== Results ==
*	Elected in Naismith Memorial Basketball Hall of Fame

Eastern Division (5 wins)	Western Division (3 wins)	Denver Nuggets (1 win)

Year	Result	Host arena	Host city	Game MVP
1968	East 126, West 120	Hinkle Fieldhouse	Indianapolis	Larry Brown*, New Orleans Buccaneers
1969	West 133, East 127	Louisville Convention Center	Louisville, Kentucky	John Beasley, Dallas Chaparrals
1970	West 128, East 98	Fairgrounds Coliseum	Indianapolis (2)	Spencer Haywood*, Denver Rockets
1971	East 126, West 122	Greensboro Coliseum	Greensboro, North Carolina	Mel Daniels*, Indiana Pacers
1972	East 142, West 115	Freedom Hall	Louisville, Kentucky (2)	Dan Issel*, Kentucky Colonels
1973	West 123, East 111	Salt Palace	Salt Lake City	Warren Jabali, Denver Rockets
1974	East 128, West 112	Norfolk Scope	Norfolk, Virginia	Artis Gilmore*, Kentucky Colonels
1975	East 151, West 124	HemisFair Arena	San Antonio, Texas	Freddie Lewis, Spirits of St. Louis
1976	Denver Nuggets 144, ABA All-Stars 138	McNichols Arena	Denver, Colorado	David Thompson*, Denver Nuggets

== Players with most selections in ABA All-Star Game ==
*	Elected in Naismith Memorial Basketball Hall of Fame

Player	Games	Teams	Years
Mel Daniels*	7	Indiana Pacers	1968, 1969, 1970, 1971, 1972, 1973, 1974
Louie Dampier*	7	Kentucky Colonels	1968, 1969, 1970, 1972, 1973, 1974, 1975
Dan Issel*	6	Kentucky Colonels, Denver Nuggets	1971, 1972, 1973, 1974, 1975, 1976
Jimmy Jones	6	New Orleans Buccaneers/Memphis Pros, Utah Stars	1968, 1969, 1970, 1971, 1973, 1974
Julius Erving*	5	Virginia Squires, New York Nets	1972, 1973, 1974, 1975, 1976
Artis Gilmore*	5	Kentucky Colonels	1972, 1973, 1974, 1975, 1976
Ralph Simpson	5	Denver Nuggets	1972, 1973, 1974, 1975, 1976
Mack Calvin	5	The Floridians, Carolina Cougars, Denver Nuggets	1971, 1972, 1973, 1974, 1975
Donnie Freeman	5	Minnesota Muskies/Miami Floridians, Texas Chaparrals/Dallas Chaparrals	1968, 1969, 1970, 1971, 1972
Rick Barry*	4	Oakland Oaks/Washington Caps, New York Nets	1969, 1970, 1971, 1972
Roger Brown*	4	Indiana Pacers	1968, 1970, 1971, 1972
Larry Jones	4	Denver Rockets, The Floridians	1968, 1969, 1970, 1971
Warren Jabali	4	Washington Caps, The Floridians, Denver Rockets	1970, 1972, 1973, 1974
Ron Boone	4	Utah Stars, Spirits of St. Louis	1971, 1974, 1975, 1976
Freddie Lewis	4	Indiana Pacers, Spirits of St. Louis	1968, 1970, 1972, 1975
Bob Netolicky	4	Indiana Pacers	1968, 1969, 1970, 1971
Billy Paultz	4	New York Nets, San Antonio Spurs	1973, 1974, 1975, 1976
Red Robbins	4	New Orleans Buccaneers, Utah Stars	1968, 1969, 1970, 1971

== ABA All-Star Game head coaches ==
*	Elected to the Naismith Memorial Basketball Hall of Fame as a coach

=== Eastern Division (1968–1975) ===
Year	Head coach	Team	Ref.
1968	Jim Pollard	Minnesota Muskies	
1969	Gene Rhodes	Kentucky Colonels	
1970	Slick Leonard*	Indiana Pacers	
1971	Al Bianchi	Virginia Squires	
1972	Joe Mullaney	Kentucky Colonels	
1973	Larry Brown*	Carolina Cougars	
1974	Babe McCarthy	Kentucky Colonels	
1975	Kevin Loughery	New York Nets	

=== Western Division (1968–1975) ===
Year	Head coach	Team	Ref.
1968	Babe McCarthy (2)	New Orleans Buccaneers	
1969	Alex Hannum*	Oakland Oaks	
1970	Babe McCarthy (3)	New Orleans Buccaneers	
1971	Bill Sharman*	Utah Stars	
1972	LaDell Andersen	Utah Stars	
1973	LaDell Andersen (2)	Utah Stars	
1974	Joe Mullaney (2)	Utah Stars	
1975	Larry Brown* (2)	Denver Nuggets	

=== ABA All-Stars vs. Denver Nuggets (1976) ===
Year	Head coach	Team	All-Star Team	Ref.
1976	Kevin Loughery (2)	New York Nets	ABA All-Stars	
1976	Larry Brown* (3)	Denver Nuggets	Denver Nuggets	

=== Most selections ===
Head coach	#	Selections
Larry Brown*	3	1973 (Eastern Division) 1975 (Western Division) 1976 (Denver Nuggets)
Babe McCarthy	3	1968 (Western Division) 1970 (Western Division) 1974 (Eastern Division)
Kevin Loughery	2	1975 (Eastern Division) 1976 (ABA All-Stars)
LaDell Andersen	2	1972 (Western Division) 1973 (Western Division)
Joe Mullaney	2	1972 (Eastern Division) 1974 (Western Division)

== See also ==
- List of American Basketball Association awards and honors
- ABA All-Star Game MVP
- NBA–ABA All-Star Game
