= 1974 ABA All-Star Game =

Exhibition basketball game

The seventh American Basketball Association All-Star Game was played January 30, 1974 at Norfolk Scope in Norfolk, Virginia before an audience at 10,624. Babe McCarthy of the Kentucky Colonels coached the East, while Joe Mullaney of the Utah Stars coached the West. During the day's game, the Virginia Squires traded away star player George Gervin to the San Antonio Spurs in exchange for $250,000 as a means to help keep their franchise afloat.

Rookie Swen Nater scored 29 points and grabbed 22 rebounds for the West team, but the East team won the game and Artis Gilmore of the Kentucky Colonels was named MVP.

Score by Periods:	1	2	3	4	Final
West	25	30	28	29	112
East	35	27	37	29	128

== Western Conference ==
Player, Team	MIN	FGM	FGA	3PM	3PA	FTM	FTA	REB	AST	STL	BLK	PFS	PTS
George McGinnis, IND	30	7	21	0	0	0	0	11	1	1	0	3	14
Swen Nater, SAS	28	13	24	0	0	3	4	22	0	0	2	2	29
Jimmy Jones, UTS	25	4	6	0	0	3	5	4	2	0	0	1	11
Willie Wise, UTS	25	4	12	0	0	0	0	7	0	1	1	1	8
Ron Boone, UTS	24	7	13	1	2	0	0	3	5	1	0	1	15
Warren Jabali, DNR	24	3	15	0	5	0	1	2	3	1	0	2	6
Ralph Simpson, DNR	23	6	17	0	0	0	0	1	0	1	0	0	12
Stew Johnson, SDC	22	3	9	0	2	2	2	4	0	0	0	2	8
Mel Daniels, IND	20	2	11	0	0	1	2	7	0	0	1	2	5
Rich Jones, SAS	19	2	11	0	1	0	0	8	2	0	1	4	4
Totals	240	51	139	1	10	9	14	69	13	5	5	18	112

== Eastern Conference ==
Player, Team	MIN	FGM	FGA	3PM	3PA	FTM	FTA	REB	AST	STL	BLK	PFS	PTS
Artis Gilmore, KEN	27	8	12	0	0	2	3	13	1	1	4	4	18
Julius Erving, NYN	27	6	15	0	0	2	2	11	8	0	3	1	14
Mack Calvin, CAR	27	3	10	0	0	2	3	2	11	1	0	3	8
Dan Issel, KEN	26	10	15	0	0	1	1	4	1	1	1	1	21
Ted McClain, CAR	25	6	8	0	0	0	0	3	4	2	0	3	12
Louie Dampier, KEN	23	8	12	0	0	0	0	2	1	0	0	0	16
Larry Kenon, NYN	22	8	12	0	0	2	3	6	0	0	0	1	18
George Thompson, MMT	21	5	8	0	0	0	0	2	3	0	0	1	10
George Gervin, VIR	21	3	9	0	1	3	4	5	3	0	0	1	9
Jim Eakins, VIR	21	1	4	0	0	0	0	4	4	2	3	2	2
Billy Paultz, NYN (injured)
Totals	240	58	105	0	1	12	16	52	36	7	11	17	128

- Halftime — East, 62–55
- Third Quarter — East, 99–83
- Officials: John Vanak and Wally Rooney
- Attendance: 10,624
