= Bob Netolicky =

American basketball player

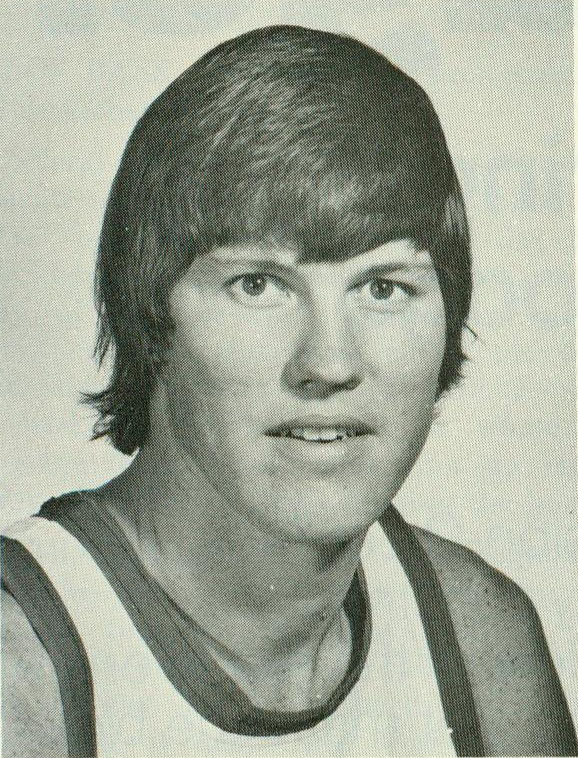

Personal information
- Born: August 2, 1942 (age 84) San Francisco, California, U.S.
- Listed height: 6 ft 9 in (2.06 m)
- Listed weight: 220 lb (100 kg)

Career information
- High school: Washington (Cedar Rapids, Iowa)
- College: Drake (1964–1967)
- NBA draft: 1967: 2nd round, 18th overall pick
- Drafted by: San Diego Rockets
- Playing career: 1967–1976
- Position: Power forward / center
- Number: 24

Career history
- 1967–1972: Indiana Pacers
- 1972–1973: Dallas Chaparrals / San Antonio Spurs
- 1973–1976: Indiana Pacers

Career highlights
- 2× ABA champion (1970, 1972); All-ABA Second Team (1970); 4× ABA All-Star (1968–1971); ABA All-Rookie First Team (1968); ABA All-Time Team; First-team All-MVC (1967)

Career statistics
- Points: 9,876 (16.0 ppg)
- Rebounds: 5,518 (8.9 rpg)
- Assists: 848 (1.4 apg)
- Stats at Basketball Reference

Robert Netolicky (born August 2, 1942) is an American former basketball player. A 6'9" power forward/center, he played professionally in the now–defunct American Basketball Association (ABA) from 1967 to 1976. Netolicky was a four–time ABA All–Star and two–time ABA Champion.

== Career ==
A graduate of Washington High School in Cedar Rapids, Iowa, where his father was a surgeon, Netolicky was an All-American selection at Drake University, playing for Coach Maury John. Netolicky was a first team All–Missouri Valley Conference selection in 1967 and left as Drake's all–time rebounding leader (717), and fifth all–time leading scorer, with 997 points, playing for the Drake Bulldogs from 1963 to 1967. After his career at Drake, Netolicky was drafted by the National Basketball Association's (NBA) San Diego Rockets as the 18th pick the 1967 NBA draft, one selection behind Phil Jackson by the New York Knicks.

However, he never played for the Rockets, instead joining the new ABA's Indiana Pacers, who had drafted him in the first ABA draft. A four–time ABA All-Star and two–time ABA Champion, Netolicky was a well–rounded player who could rebound, defend, and shoot the ball equally well. Jim O'Brien of The Sporting News once claimed that Netolicky was the "smoothest shooting big man in the ABA." Besides the Pacers, Netolicky briefly played for the Dallas Chaparrals/San Antonio Spurs. He ended his ABA career with 9,876 career points and 5,518 career rebounds.

=== Indiana Pacers 1967–1972 ===
Drafted by the Pacers in the first ABA draft, Netolicky would play in every season of the ABA. It was noted that Netolicky negotiated a Chevrolet Corvette into his initial Pacers signing bonus. As a rookie in 1967–68, playing under Pacers Coach Larry Staverman, Netolicky averaged 16.3 points and 11.5 rebounds, as the Indiana Pacers finished 38–40 in their first season. In the playoffs, Netolicky averaged 22.3 points and 7.3 rebounds in a series loss to the eventual champion Pittsburgh Pipers. Netolicky was named to the All–ABA Rookie team with Louie Dampier of the Kentucky Colonels, Mel Daniels of the Minnesota Muskies, Jimmy Jones of the New Orleans Buccaneers and Trooper Washington of the Pittsburgh Pipers. Netolicky was selected as a member of the East team in the ABA All–Star game.

In his second season, the Pacers won the ABA Eastern Division championship with a 44–34 record after Larry Staverman was replaced by Hall of Fame coach Slick Leonard early in the season. Playing alongside Naismith Basketball Hall of Fame members Roger Brown and Mel Daniels, as well as Freddie Lewis, Netolicky averaged 18.9 points and 10.2 rebounds in the regular season. After defeating the Kentucky Colonels and Miami Floridians in the playoffs, the Pacers advanced to the ABA Finals, where they lost to the Oakland Oaks in five games. In a losing effort, Netolicky averaged 26.4 points in the Finals to lead the Pacers. Netolicky was again selected to appear in the ABA All–Star game representing the East.

Netolicky helped lead the Pacers to the ABA Championship in 1969–70. The Pacers finished the season with a 59–25 record to win the Eastern Division. Netolicky averaged 20.6 points and 10.7 rebounds in the regular season. On April 12, 1970, the Pacers defeated the Pittsburgh Pipers 177–135, with Netolicky scoring 28 points in the game. In the playoffs, under Coach Slick Leonard, the Pacers swept the Carolina Cougars in four games and defeated the Kentucky Colonels 4 games to 1 to advance to the ABA Finals. In the ABA Finals, the Pacers defeated the Los Angeles Stars 4 games to 2 to win the ABA championship, with Netolicky averaging 20.3 points in the Finals, second on the Pacers who were led by Roger Brown's 33.2 average. In the second game of the series, a 114-111 Pacers victory, Netolicky scored 32 points, making 14 of 22 shots, including 10 in a row in the second half. Netolicky also grabbed a rebound with six seconds left, drawing a foul. He then made the two free throws to complete the scoring. Before a game 5 loss, Netolicky had gone water skiing the previous day with his attorney and strained muscles in his arm. In game 5, he made 7 of 22 shots and shot a few air balls in a 117–113 overtime loss. After the game he said, "I missed about 10 easy shots, if I hadn't gone water skiing, we would have won it at home." In 1969–70, Netolicky was named to the All–ABA Second Team and was selected to play in his third consecutive ABA All–Star game.

In 1970–71, Netolicky was named to appear in the ABA All–Star game for the final time in his career. Netolicky averaged 18.8 points and 9.4 rebounds as the Pacers won the ABA Western Division title with a 58–26 record. After sweeping the Memphis Pros in four games to begin the playoffs, the Pacers were defeated in the Western Division Finals by the eventual ABA champion Utah Stars in seven games, as Netolicky averaged 14.4 points in the series.

The Indiana Pacers won a second ABA Championship in 1971–72, with Netolicky averaging 15.1 points and 9.2 rebounds during the regular season. In the playoffs, the Pacers defeated the Denver Rockets in seven games and the defending champion Utah Stars in seven games to advance to the ABA Finals. Netolicky averaged 16.7 points and 9.3 rebounds against the Rockets and 10.7 points with 5.6 rebounds against Utah. In the finals victory over the New York Nets, losing time to Pacers teammate George McGinnis, Netolicky averaged 4.3 points in the six-game series.

=== Dallas Chaparrals 1972–1973/San Antonio Spurs 1973 ===
Netolicky played for the Dallas Chaparrals in the 1972–73 season. Netolicky had been purchased from the Indiana Pacers on August 12, 1972, for $250,000. With Dallas, Netolicky played center instead of his usual power–forward position and averaged 18.7 points and 10.2 rebounds for the Chaparrals, who finished 28–56. He was the team's leading rebounder and second leading scorer. Dallas missed the 1973 ABA playoffs.

The Dallas Chaparrals moved to San Antonio, Texas, in 1973. Netolicky continued with the franchise to begin the 1973–74 season, playing 19 games with the Spurs at power forward and averaging 12.1 points and 5.3 rebounds at age 31. After 19 games with the Spurs, Netolicky was reacquired by the Indiana Pacers for cash and a draft pick.

=== Indiana Pacers 1973–1975 ===
Rejoining the Pacers in November, 1973, Netolicky was reunited with coach Slick Leonard and his former Pacers teammates Roger Brown, Freddie Lewis, Mel Daniels and George McGinnis. Netolicky played 20.7 minutes per game, averaging 9.1 points and 5.9 rebounds in 56 games for the Pacers. Indiana had a 7–8 record when Netolicky rejoined the team, but finished with a 46–38 record. The Pacers qualified for the playoffs, defeating Netolicky's former San Antiono Spurs in seven games before losing to the Utah Stars in seven games. An injured Netolicky did not play in the playoffs.

Netolicky is one of the few professional basketball players to play for both teams in the same game. On November 14, 1973, Netolicky was playing for the San Antonio Spurs when they lost at home to the Indiana Pacers on a last–second shot. The Spurs protested the loss, and the ABA Commissioner ruled for San Antonio. The Pacers' last-second basket was disallowed, and the remaining 30 seconds of the game (which was the portion that San Antonio had protested) was ordered replayed immediately before the next Pacers–at–Spurs game, on December 2, 1973. By that time, however, Netolicky had been traded to Indiana. He played the final 30 seconds of regulation for the Pacers, plus the subsequent overtime.

In his final full season, Netolicky averaged 7.5 points and 3.5 rebounds for the 1974–75 Pacers. He scored total 10 points in seven playoff games, playing as a deep reserve, as the Pacers were defeated by the Kentucky Colonels after advancing to the ABA Finals.

The 1975–76 season was the final ABA season, as the league merged into the NBA after the season. After playing four games in the 1975–76 season, Netolicky's career ended with his last game on October 29, 1975. He retired with ABA career averages of 16.0 points, 8.9 rebounds and 1.4 assists on 49.4% shooting in 618 career ABA games.

In 1978, Netolicky played eight games with the Baltimore Metros/Mohawk Valley Thunderbirds of the Continental Basketball Association, averaging 15.0 points and 7.0 rebounds. The team was coached by his longtime Pacers teammate Freddie Lewis.

== Personal life ==
Netolicky was very close longtime friends with his Pacers teammate Mel Daniels.

Bob Netolicky was a fan favorite during his playing days, well known for his advocacy of mod lifestyle and his exotic pets (including a lion and an ocelot). One sportswriter called him the "Broadway Joe Namath of the ABA", since he had become a veritable sex symbol to many of Indiana's female fans.

During his career, Netolicky owned a popular nightclub in Indianapolis called Neto's, located in the Meadows Shopping Center. Neto's was frequented by players and celebrities alike. Netolicky also sponsored numerous race cars and operated a car dealership.

== Honors ==
- Netolicky was named to the All-Time American Basketball Association team in 1997.
