= 1975 ABA All-Star Game =

Exhibition basketball game

The eighth American Basketball Association All-Star Game was played January 28, 1975 at HemisFair Arena in San Antonio, Texas before an audience at 10,449. Kevin Loughery of the New York Nets coached the East, with Larry Brown of the Denver Nuggets coached the West.

Freddie Lewis of the Spirits of St. Louis scored 12 of his game-high 26 points in the first period and was named the All-Star Game MVP.

Score by Periods:	1	2	3	4	Final
West	32	28	30	34	124
East	32	38	39	42	151

== Western Conference ==
Player, Team	MIN	FGM	FGA	3PM	3PA	FTM	FTA	REB	AST	STL	BLK	PFS	PTS
George McGinnis, IND	32	6	14	0	1	6	11	12	5	3	1	5	18
George Gervin, SAS	30	8	15	0	1	7	8	6	3	6	5	2	23
Mack Calvin, DNN	28	4	16	0	1	9	10	3	7	1	0	2	17
Swen Nater, SAS	26	5	13	0	0	2	2	5	1	0	0	3	12
Ralph Simpson, DNN	25	3	10	0	0	0	0	3	0	1	0	1	6
James Silas, SAS	23	5	7	0	0	11	11	3	5	2	0	3	21
Ron Boone, UTS	23	4	8	0	0	2	2	2	2	1	2	4	10
Moses Malone, UTS	20	2	3	0	0	2	5	10	0	0	1	1	6
Mike Green, DNN	18	3	6	0	0	0	0	3	0	0	0	4	6
Caldwell Jones, SDC	15	2	4	0	0	1	1	4	0	0	1	4	5
Totals	240	42	96	0	3	40	50	51	23	14	10	29	124

== Eastern Conference ==
Player, Team	MIN	FGM	FGA	3PM	3PA	FTM	FTA	REB	AST	STL	BLK	PFS	PTS
Freddie Lewis, SSL	33	11	15	1	1	3	3	5	10	2	0	3	26
Artis Gilmore, KEN	28	4	8	0	0	3	7	13	2	1	1	3	11
Julius Erving, NYN	27	6	12	1	1	8	10	7	7	2	1	4	21
Louie Dampier, KEN	27	5	8	1	2	0	0	3	1	2	0	4	11
Brian Taylor, NYN	21	9	13	0	0	3	5	1	3	4	0	4	21
Marvin Barnes, SSL	21	6	13	0	0	4	4	1	1	0	0	2	16
Dan Issel, KEN	20	3	6	0	0	1	2	7	1	0	0	4	7
Billy Paultz, NYN	18	2	7	0	0	0	0	4	4	1	3	2	4
Larry Kenon, NYN	16	6	11	0	0	0	0	4	1	0	0	0	12
Dave Twardzik, VIR	15	4	4	0	0	6	7	1	3	4	0	6	14
Stew Johnson, MMS	14	4	11	0	1	0	0	3	2	1	0	2	8
Totals	240	60	108	3	5	28	38	49	35	17	5	34	151

- Halftime — East, 70–60
- Third Quarter — East, 109–90
- Officials: Jack Madden and Jess Kersey
- Attendance: 10,449
