= Swen Nater =

Dutch basketball player (born 1950)

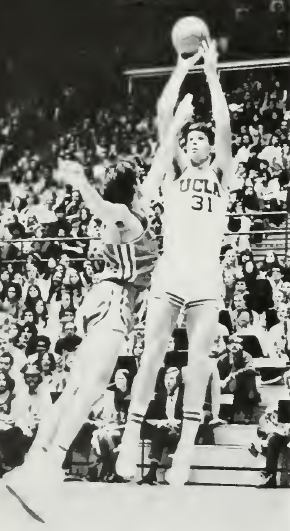
- Nater shooting with UCLA in 1972–73

Personal information
- Born: January 14, 1950 (age 76) Den Helder, Netherlands
- Listed height: 6 ft 11 in (2.11 m)
- Listed weight: 240 lb (109 kg)

Career information
- High school: Wilson (Long Beach, California)
- College: Cypress College (1968–1970); UCLA (1971–1973)
- NBA draft: 1973: 1st round, 16th overall pick
- Drafted by: Milwaukee Bucks
- Playing career: 1973–1985
- Position: Center
- Number: 31, 10, 35, 41

Career history
- 1973: Virginia Squires
- 1973–1975: San Antonio Spurs
- 1975–1976: New York Nets
- 1976: Virginia Squires
- 1976–1977: Milwaukee Bucks
- 1977–1983: Buffalo Braves / San Diego Clippers
- 1983–1984: Los Angeles Lakers
- 1984–1985: Australian Udine

Career highlights
- 2× ABA All-Star (1974, 1975); 2× All-ABA Second Team (1974, 1975); ABA Rookie of the Year (1974); ABA All-Rookie First Team (1974); NBA rebounding leader (1980); ABA rebounding leader (1975); 2× NCAA champion (1972, 1973)

Career ABA and NBA statistics
- Points: 8,980 (12.4 ppg)
- Rebounds: 8,340 (11.6 rpg)
- Assists: 1,235 (1.7 apg)
- Stats at NBA.com
- Stats at Basketball Reference

Swen Erick Nater (born January 14, 1950) is a Dutch former professional basketball player. He played primarily in the American Basketball Association (ABA) and National Basketball Association (NBA), and is the only player to have led both the NBA and ABA in rebounding. Nater was a two-time ABA All-Star and was the 1974 ABA Rookie of the Year. He played college basketball for the UCLA Bruins, winning two National Collegiate Athletic Association (NCAA) titles.

== Early life ==
Nater was born in the Netherlands in Den Helder. His parents divorced when he was three years old. When his mother remarried and the family's economic situation deteriorated, she, her husband, and Nater's younger brother moved to the United States, leaving Nater and his sister in an orphanage. After three years it appeared they would remain in the Netherlands until a television show, It Could Be You (a forerunner to This Is Your Life), discovered the situation and brought the two siblings to America to be reunited—on TV—with the rest of the family. At age nine, he was in a new country and did not speak a word of English. He took his stepfather's name and was known as Swen Langeberg.

Nater did not get along with his stepfather, who did not want him to play basketball. Nater graduated from Long Beach Wilson High School in Long Beach, California. He tried out for their basketball team as a junior, but he was cut. He had arrived at the first practice barefoot but was told by the coach he needed shoes. His family unable to afford them, Nater returned to practice with shoes stolen from a teammate. The coach told Nater to leave. He did not try out as a senior.

== College career ==
Nater attended and played basketball at Cypress College, a junior college in Cypress, California (where he met his wife, Marlene). Under Chargers head coach Don Johnson, he played little as a freshman, but was a Community College All-American as a sophomore. He earned a scholarship to UCLA. After leaving Cypress, he changed back to his father's name, Nater. He had already moved out from his stepfather's home after he forbade Nater from playing at Cypress.

Nater redshirted his first year with the UCLA Bruins. He helped John Wooden's squads win two NCAA titles. He was a backup to Bill Walton, and averaged just 3.2 points and 3.3 rebounds per game as a senior. He never started a collegiate game—his primary role was helping to develop Walton in practice. Hoping to impress pro scouts, Nater played in the 1973 Pizza Hut All-Star Basketball Classic, and logged 34 points with 23 rebounds to earn most valuable player honors.

== Professional career ==
Nater was drafted by The Floridians in the 1972 ABA Draft, and then by the Virginia Squires in the June 1972 ABA dispersal draft after the Floridians' demise. Nater was also drafted in the first round of the 1973 NBA draft with the 16th overall pick by the Milwaukee Bucks; he was the first NBA first-round pick to have played in the NCAA without ever starting a college game. Milwaukee offered him $50,000. In August 1973, he opted to sign a three-year, $300,000 contract with the Squires, who spread the payments over seven years. On November 21, 1973, the Squires traded Nater to the San Antonio Spurs for a draft pick and $300,000.

With the Spurs, Nater was the ABA Rookie of the Year after averaging 14.1 points and 12.6 rebounds for the season. He led the ABA in field goal percentage in 1974 and led the league in rebounding in 1975. He was named to the All-ABA Second Team in 1974 and 1975 and participated in the ABA All-Star Game both seasons. He was traded to the New York Nets after the 1974–75 season in exchange for forward Larry Kenon. The Nets had expected Nater to solve their rebounding problems from the prior year, and also traded their starting center Billy Paultz to the Spurs in a separate deal to make room for Nater. However, Nater was a disappointment with the Nets, averaging just 8.7 points and 10.3 rebounds per game before the Nets traded him back to the Squires along with forward Bill Schaeffer in exchange for center Jim Eakins midway through the 1975–76 season.

Nater's NBA career began with the Milwaukee Bucks. During the 1976-77 NBA season, Nater amassed three games where he had at least 20 rebounds and 20 points, including a 30-point and 33 rebound performance in a 126–109 win over the Atlanta Hawks on December 19, 1976. After the season ended, Milwaukee traded Nater to the Buffalo Braves for Buffalo's first round draft pick, which Milwaukee used to select Marques Johnson. When the Braves moved to San Diego and became the Clippers a year later, Nater became a local favorite. Nater led the NBA in rebounding average during the 1979–80 season, making him the only player ever to lead both the NBA and ABA in rebounding. On January 12, 1982, he had surgery to remove bone chips from his right knee. The injury limited him to just 14 games in 1981–82 and seven in 1982–83.

Before the 1983–84 season, Nater was traded by the Clippers along with a just-drafted Byron Scott to the Los Angeles Lakers for Norm Nixon, Eddie Jordan, and a 1986 second-round draft pick (which would eventually be dealt to the Phoenix Suns and become Jeff Hornacek). The Lakers acquired him to backup Kareem Abdul Jabbar. Nater and Scott helped lead the Lakers to the NBA Finals that year, but the next season the team did not offer him a guaranteed contract.

Nater played for Australian Udine in the Italian League, where he was the best paid player and led the league in rebounding even though the team ended up being relegated. The next season, he initially accepted an offer from Barcelona in the Spanish League, but ultimately he changed his mind and decided to retire.

== Career statistics ==
Legend
GP	Games played	GS	Games started	MPG	Minutes per game
FG%	Field goal percentage	3P%	3-point field goal percentage	FT%	Free throw percentage
RPG	Rebounds per game	APG	Assists per game	SPG	Steals per game
BPG	Blocks per game	PPG	Points per game	**Bold**	Career high
*	Led the league

=== Regular season ===
Year	Team	GP	GS	MPG	FG%	3P%	FT%	RPG	APG	SPG	BPG	PPG
1973–74 (ABA)	Virginia	17	–	22.0	**.556***	.000	.630	9.1	1.0	0.4	0.9	12.6
1973–74 (ABA)	San Antonio	62	–	32.3	.551*	.000	.740	13.6	**1.8**	0.4	0.8	14.5
1974–75 (ABA)	San Antonio	**78**	–	**34.8**	.542	.000	**.752**	**16.4***	1.2	**0.6**	**1.1**	**15.1**
1975–76 (ABA)	New York	43	–	23.6	.485	.000	.718	10.3	0.4	0.4	0.6	8.7
1975–76 (ABA)	Virginia	33	–	23.5	.498	.000	.675	9.8	1.1	0.4	0.8	11.3
1976–77	Milwaukee	72	–	27.2	.528	–	.754	12.0	1.5	**0.8**	**0.7**	13.0
1977–78	Buffalo	78	–	**35.6**	.504	–	.765	13.2	2.8	0.5	0.6	15.5
1978–79	San Diego	79	–	25.4	.569	–	.800	8.9	1.8	0.5	0.4	10.7
1979–80	San Diego	81	–	35.3	.554	.000	.718	**15.0***	**2.9**	0.6	0.5	13.4
1980–81	San Diego	**82**	–	34.3	.553	.000	.795	12.4	2.4	0.6	0.6	**15.6**
1981–82	San Diego	21	**7**	27.4	**.577**	**1.000**	.747	9.1	1.4	0.3	0.4	12.5
1982–83	San Diego	7	0	7.3	.300	.000	**1.000**	1.9	0.1	0.1	0.0	2.3
1983–84	Los Angeles	69	0	12.0	.490	.000	.692	3.8	0.4	0.4	0.1	4.5
Career		722	7	28.7	.535	.100	.748	11.6	1.7	0.5	0.6	12.4

=== Playoffs ===
Year	Team	GP	GS	MPG	FG%	3P%	FT%	RPG	APG	SPG	BPG	PPG
1973–74 (ABA)	San Antonio	**7**	–	30.1	**.553**	.000	**.714**	11.7	**2.1**	**0.4**	0.7	**14.9**
1974–75 (ABA)	San Antonio	6	–	**39.0**	.476	.000	.429	**16.5**	1.0	0.2	**1.0**	14.8
1983–84	Los Angeles	17	–	8.6	.500	.000	.769	2.4	0.1	0.1	0.1	3.4
Career		30	–	19.7	.512	.000	.639	7.4	0.7	0.2	0.4	8.4

== After the NBA ==
He built the basketball program at Christian Heritage College in San Diego, California, and coached the team from 1985 to 1995. He left the position because it "was high on work and low on pay.” He was living in El Cajon, California, where his two daughters were born and raised.

Nater later lived in Enumclaw, Washington, where he went to work for Costco, for whom he was a sporting goods assistant buyer. and then in Des Moines, Washington overlooking Puget Sound, with his wife Dr. Wendy Ghiora.

Nater has also co-authored books with basketball coaches Wooden and Pete Newell.

== Publications ==
- Wooden, John; Nater, Swen (2006). John Wooden's UCLA Offense. Human Kinetics. ISBN 9780736061803.
- Newell, Pete; Nater, Swen (2007). Pete Newell's Playing Big. Champaign, Illinois: Human Kinetics. ISBN 9780736068093.

== See also ==
- List of NBA career field goal percentage leaders
- List of NBA annual rebounding leaders
- List of NBA single-game rebounding leaders
