= 1972 ABA All-Star Game =

Exhibition basketball game

The 1972 American Basketball Association All-Star Game, the league's fifth, was played to a win by the East, 142–115, on January 29, 1972, at Freedom Hall in Louisville, Kentucky. It was played before a crowd of 15,738, with Joe Mullaney of the Kentucky Colonels coaching the East, and LaDell Andersen of the Utah Stars coaching the West.

Dan Issel of the Kentucky Colonels was named MVP. Jim McDaniels scored 18 of his 24 points in the East's 45-point fourth quarter.

== Scoring ==
At halftime, the West led, 66–65; at end of the third quarter, the East led, 97–89. The East had a 45-point fourth quarter, leading to the final score of East 142, West 115.

Score by Periods:	1	2	3	4	Final
West	31	35	23	26	115
East	36	29	32	45	142

== Statistics ==
=== Western Conference ===
Player, Team	MIN	FGM	FGA	3PM	3PA	FTM	FTA	REB	AST	PTS
Willie Wise, UTS	33	5	8	0	0	5	7	9	3	15
Zelmo Beaty, UTS	27	7	11	0	0	1	1	7	0	15
Mel Daniels, IND	26	8	14	0	0	5	8	9	1	21
Roger Brown, IND	25	2	7	0	2	0	1	6	2	4
Donnie Freeman, DLC	21	3	8	0	0	7	8	5	2	13
Ralph Simpson, DNR	20	6	14	0	1	0	1	1	0	12
Steve Jones, DLC	19	3	7	1	1	2	2	2	3	9
Freddie Lewis, IND	18	7	13	1	2	3	4	1	1	18
Glen Combs, UTS	18	1	8	0	3	0	0	0	3	2
Wendell Ladner, CAR	14	2	5	0	2	0	0	6	1	4
Wil Jones, MMP	10	1	3	0	0	0	0	3	0	2
Art Becker, DNR	9	0	2	0	0	0	0	0	1	0
Totals	240	45	100	2	11	23	32	49	17	115

=== Eastern Conference ===
Player, Team	MIN	FGM	FGA	3PM	3PA	FTM	FTA	REB	AST	PTS
Artis Gilmore, KEN	27	4	5	0	0	6	10	10	2	14
Rick Barry, NYN	26	2	10	0	0	0	1	12	8	4
Julius Erving, VIR	25	9	15	0	0	2	2	6	3	20
Dan Issel, KEN	23	9	13	0	0	3	4	9	5	21
Charlie Scott, VIR	23	9	21	0	1	2	3	4	3	20
John Brisker, PTC	21	3	10	0	1	2	3	5	3	8
Jim McDaniels, CAR	20	11	15	0	0	2	3	11	1	24
Bill Melchionni, NYN	18	2	4	0	0	1	1	2	2	5
George Thompson, PTC	17	5	9	0	2	0	0	0	2	10
Warren Jabali, FLO	17	2	8	0	1	0	0	9	1	4
Mack Calvin, FLO	14	4	7	0	0	2	0	2	4	10
Louie Dampier, KEN	9	1	4	0	2	0	0	1	3	2
Totals	240	61	121	0	7	20	29	71	37	142

== Other details ==
Officials for the game were John Vanak and Bob Serafin.
