= LaDell Andersen =

American basketball coach (1929–2019)

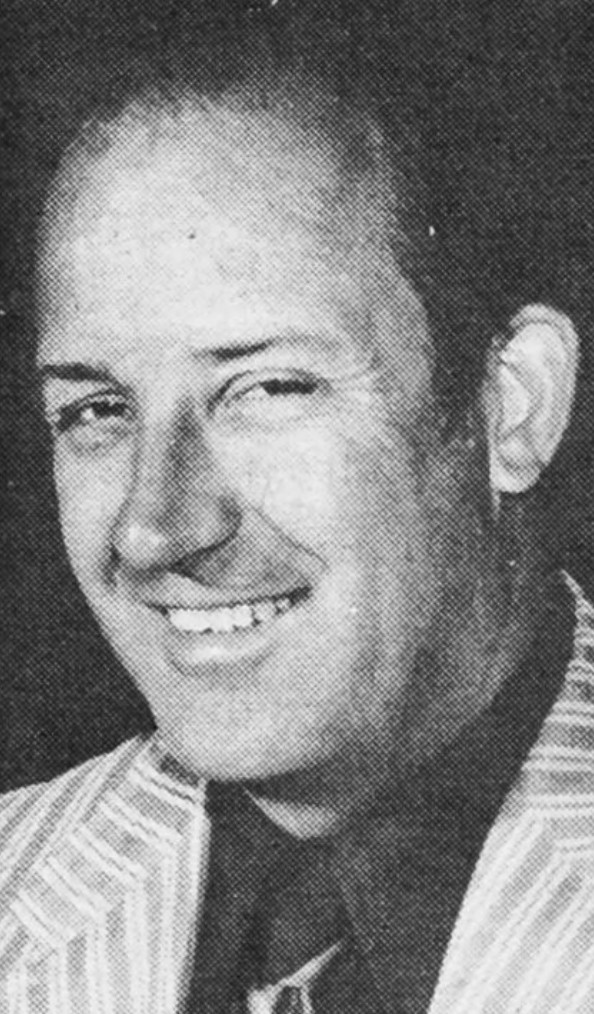

Biographical details
- Born: October 25, 1929; Malad City, Idaho, U.S.
- Died: December 29, 2019 (aged 90); St. George, Utah, U.S.

Playing career
- 1948–1951: Utah State

Coaching career (HC unless noted)
- 1956–1961: Utah (assistant)
- 1961–1971: Utah State
- 1971–1973: Utah Stars
- 1983–1989: BYU

Administrative career (AD unless noted)
- 1973–1983: Utah State

Head coaching record
- Overall: 287–167 (college); 115–52 (ABA regular season)
- Tournaments: 6–10 (NCAA); 2–2 (NIT)

Accomplishments and honors

Championships
- WAC regular season (1988)

Awards
- WAC Coach of the Year (1988); 2× ABA All-Star Game head coach (1972, 1973)

LaDell Andersen (October 25, 1929 – December 29, 2019) was an American college and professional basketball coach.

== Career ==
Born in Malad City, Idaho, Andersen attended Utah State University, where he became a member of the Sigma Chi fraternity. He was an All-Skyline Conference and an honorable mention All-American basketball player in 1951. He was also invited and competed in the 1952 United States Men's Olympic Basketball Team tryouts in New York City.

Andersen was hired in 1956 as an assistant coach for University of Utah coach Jack Gardner. Andersen left the Utes in 1961 to become head coach of his alma mater.

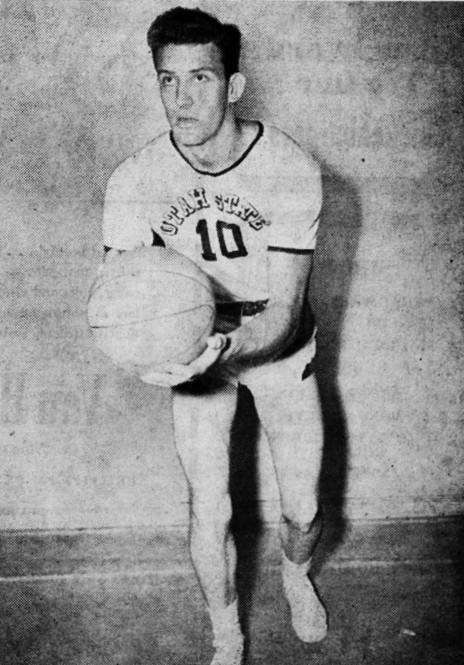
Andersen as a player for the Utah State Aggies men's basketball team, circa 1951.

During his tenure as the Aggies head coach, Utah State made four appearances in the NCAA basketball tournament including a trip to the Elite Eight in 1970, losing to eventual champion UCLA. Andersen also led them to two appearances in the National Invitation Tournament. He compiled a record of 176–96 (.647) at the school from 1961 to 1971. Former LSU coaching great Dale Brown served as an assistant coach during Andersen's tenure. Andersen recommended Brown as his successor, but when USU officials rejected the idea, Brown went to Washington State for one season as an assistant before succeeding Press Maravich as LSU's coach, where he remained for 25 seasons (1972–97), compiling a 448–301 record.

Andersen was also the head coach of the American Basketball Association's Utah Stars for two seasons (1971–72 and 1972–73). Andersen had success with the team and led them to two Western Division regular season titles but both seasons were ended by the Indiana Pacers in the Western Division playoff finals. Andersen compiled a 115–43 (.684) regular season coaching record with the Stars. Despite his success with the Stars, Andersen resigned after his second season with the team.

He returned to Utah State University and was appointed as the school's athletic director in 1973. Andersen held the post for ten years until he was lured back into coaching again in 1983 for Brigham Young University (BYU).

Andersen coached the Cougars for six years and compiled a 114–71 (.616) record. BYU made four post season appearances including three in the NCAA basketball tournament and one in the National Invitation Tournament. He resigned as BYU head coach in 1989 and was replaced by Roger Reid.

Andersen continued to be involved in basketball acting as a scout and consultant for the NBA's Utah Jazz organization, partly because of his connections with former Utah State player and longtime Jazz assistant Phil Johnson. It is believed that he was the person who scouted John Stockton and encouraged the Jazz to draft him when they did.

Andersen died on December 29, 2019, at age 90.

== Honors ==
- Member of the Utah Sports Hall of Fame
- Named one of the Top 100 Most Accomplished People in the State of Utah, 1888–1998

== Head coaching record ==
=== College ===
Record table
Season	Team	Overall	Conference	Standing	Postseason
Utah State Aggies (Mountain States Conference) (1961–1962)
1961–62	Utah State	22–7	12–2	2nd	NCAA University Division Regional Fourth Place
Utah State Aggies (NCAA University Division independent) (1962–1971)
1962–63	Utah State	20–7			NCAA University Division First Round
1963–64	Utah State	21–8			NCAA University Division Regional Fourth Place
1964–65	Utah State	13–12			
1965–66	Utah State	12–14			
1966–67	Utah State	20–6			NIT First Round
1967–68	Utah State	14–11			
1968–69	Utah State	9–17			
1969–70	Utah State	22–7			NCAA University Division Elite Eight
1970–71	Utah State	20–7			NCAA University Division First Round
Utah State:		173–96	12–2		
BYU Cougars (Western Athletic Conference) (1983–1989)
1983–84	BYU	20–11	12–4	2nd	NCAA Division I Second Round
1984–85	BYU	15–14	9–7	T–3rd	
1985–86	BYU	18–14	11–5	4th	NIT Quarterfinal
1986–87	BYU	21–11	12–4	2nd	NCAA Division I First Round
1987–88	BYU	26–6	13–3	1st	NCAA Division I Second Round
1988–89	BYU	14–15	7–9	5th	
BYU:		114–71	64–32		
Total:		287–167			
National champion Postseason invitational champion Conference regular season champion Conference regular season and conference tournament champion Division regular season champion Division regular season and conference tournament champion Conference tournament champion

=== ABA ===
Team	Year	G	W	L	W–L%	Finish	PG	PW	PL	PW–L%	Result
Utah	1971–72	84	60	24	.714	1st in Western	11	7	4	.611	Lost in Division finals
Utah	1972–73	84	55	29	.655	1st in Western	10	6	4	.600	Lost in Division finals
Career		168	115	53	.685		21	13	8	.619	

Sporting positions
Preceded by Bill Sharman	Utah Stars Head Coach; 1971–1973	Succeeded by Joe Mullaney
