= Julius Keye =

American basketball player

Personal information
- Born: September 5, 1946 Toccoa, Georgia, U.S.
- Died: September 13, 1984 (aged 38) Marietta, Georgia, U.S.
- Listed height: 6 ft 10 in (2.08 m)
- Listed weight: 200 lb (91 kg)

Career information
- High school: Lemon Street (Marietta, Georgia)
- College: South Carolina State (1963–1966); Alcorn State (1967–1969)
- NBA draft: 1969: 3rd round, 38th overall pick
- Drafted by: Boston Celtics
- Playing career: 1969–1975
- Position: Center / power forward
- Number: 52, 50, 13, 11

Career history
- 1969–1974: Denver Rockets
- 1974–1975: Memphis Sounds

Career highlights
- ABA All-Star (1971)
- Stats at Basketball Reference

Julius Keye (September 5, 1946 – September 13, 1984) was an American professional basketball player.

A 6'10" forward/center from South Carolina State University and Alcorn State University, Keye played six seasons (1969–1975) in the American Basketball Association as a member of the Denver Rockets and the Memphis Sounds. He averaged 7.6 points per game and 11.0 rebounds per game in his career and represented Denver in the 1971 ABA All-Star Game.

Keye shares the ABA record (with Caldwell Jones) for blocked shots in a single game with 12, obtained against the Virginia Squires on December 14, 1972.

In 1984, Keye died of head injuries suffered during an epileptic seizure. He was 38 years old.
