= Freddie Lewis =

American basketball player

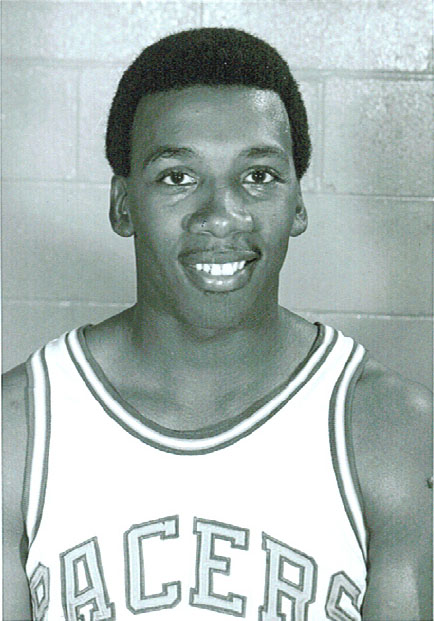

Personal information
- Born: July 1, 1943 (age 83) Huntington, West Virginia, U.S.
- Listed height: 6 ft 0 in (1.83 m)
- Listed weight: 175 lb (79 kg)

Career information
- High school: McKeesport (McKeesport, Pennsylvania)
- College: Eastern Arizona (1962–1964); Arizona State (1964–1966)
- NBA draft: 1966: 10th round, 88th overall pick
- Drafted by: Cincinnati Royals
- Playing career: 1966–1977
- Position: Point guard
- Number: 19, 14, 6, 1

Career history
- 1966–1967: Cincinnati Royals
- 1967–1974: Indiana Pacers
- 1974: Memphis Sounds
- 1974–1976: Spirits of St. Louis
- 1976–1977: Indiana Pacers

Career highlights
- 3× ABA champion (1970, 1972, 1973); ABA Playoffs MVP (1972); 3× ABA All-Star (1968, 1972, 1975); ABA All-Star Game MVP (1975); ABA All-Time Team; First-team All-WAC (1966)

Career NBA and ABA statistics
- Points: 12,033 (16.0 ppg)
- Rebounds: 2,752 (3.7 rpg)
- Assists: 2,979 (4.0 apg)
- Stats at NBA.com
- Stats at Basketball Reference

Frederick L. Lewis (born July 1, 1943) is an American former basketball player. He played professionally in the National Basketball Association (NBA) and American Basketball Association (ABA). He is the only player to start his career in the NBA, and play all 9 full ABA seasons (1967–1976) until the NBA/ABA merger, then sign back with the NBA.

Born in Huntington, West Virginia, Lewis was a fundamentally sound 6 ft 0 in (1.83 m) guard who could pass, shoot, and defend equally well. He attended McKeesport Area High School (in Pennsylvania) and Arizona State University before being drafted by the NBA's Cincinnati Royals.

Lewis played a prominent role on three American Basketball Association championship teams for the Indiana Pacers, averaging 16.6 points, 4.1 assists and 4.0 rebounds in seven seasons. His 11,660 points rank as sixth most in ABA history while his 2,883 assists rank 4th.

== Career ==
=== Early years ===
A 10th-round draft pick of the Cincinnati Royals in 1966, he earned a spot as Oscar Robertson's backup, averaging 4.7 points and 1.3 assists per game. Lewis credited Robertson for his influence on and off the court, stating "[He] taught me how to be cool, how to handle situations instead of running all over the court helter-skelter."

Lewis was selected by San Diego in the 1967 NBA expansion draft but instead signed with the Indiana Pacers of the ABA.

=== Chasing the dynasty ===
In 1972, Lewis scored 23 points, collected 12 rebounds and dished out 6 assists for the Pacers in Game 7 vs. the Utah Stars in the semifinals, hitting two free throws with 24 seconds left for the winning points. Lewis also led a comeback from a 20-point deficit in Game 5 vs. the New York Nets in the Finals, hitting the game-winning free throws with 17 seconds left in the contest.

Lewis averaged 16.1 points per game, 4 assist and 3.9 rebounds in seven seasons with the Pacers. He was a three time ABA champion and the 1972 Playoffs MVP.

Lewis also added three ABA All-Star appearances and the 1975 All-Star Game MVP award to his resume.

=== Later years ===
After the Pacers lost to the Utah Stars in the 1974 Western Division Finals, however, the Pacers traded Lewis, along with Brown and Daniels, to the Memphis Sounds. Daniels, the Sounds' starting center, then injured his back after slipping in his bathtub, and Lewis was traded to the Spirits of St. Louis in exchange for replacement center Tom Owens.

Lewis averaged a career high 22.6 points per game with the Spirits in 1974–1975, was named MVP of the 1975 ABA All-Star Game, and led the young team into the playoffs. However, Lewis suffered an ankle injury, and the Spirits bowed out to the Kentucky Colonels, the eventual champions.

After one more year with the Spirits, Lewis returned to the Pacers (who by this point had joined the NBA), and he retired in 1977 with 12,033 combined NBA/ABA career points.

=== ABA All-Time Team ===
Freddie Lewis was selected to the ABA All-Time Team on August 23, 1997, in conjunction with the ABA 30th Anniversary reunion. It comprised the thirty best and most influential players of the ABA during its 10 years and 9 full regular seasons of operation, with respect not only to performance at the professional level but in consideration of sportsmanship, team leadership, and contributions to the growth of the league basketball, and irrespective of positions played. Only players to have played at least a portion of their careers in the ABA were eligible for selection, although performance in other leagues, most notably the NBA, was ostensibly considered. Selected and announced beside the all-time team were a most valuable player and top head coach.

== Retirement ==
Lewis retired from professional basketball after the 1976–77 season and moved to California, where he spent nearly two decades working for Ozzie and Dan Silna, the former owners of the Spirits of St. Louis.

Lewis later moved to Washington, D.C., where he was an inner-city schoolteacher, working with young teens.

In 2002, Lewis moved back to Indianapolis with plans of joining the staff of Indianapolis' ABA 2000 team, and took over as head coach from former teammate Billy Keller during the franchise's final season. Alongside Mel Daniels and Bob Netolicky, Lewis was a fierce advocate for a pension to living ABA players, who did not receive a pension from the NBA despite the merger until an agreement was reached in 2022.

== Legacy ==
In 1997, Lewis was selected as one of thirty players to the ABA All-Time team, as voted on by a 50-person panel including ABA media, referees, owners and front-office executives; Lewis received 38 votes (13th most, with eleven Hall of Famers ahead of him). In eight ABA postseasons, he scored a total of 2,015 points, the second most in league history. Fellow ABA head coach Hubie Brown said Lewis "one of the all-time great guards in the ABA".

Despite his accomplishments, Lewis has not been inducted into the Naismith Basketball Hall of Fame nor had his jersey retired by the Pacers like his three ABA teammates, a fact not lost on columnist Mark Montieth and Gregg Doyel of the local The Indianapolis Star who each wrote articles on the matter in recent years. Among people recommending Lewis having his jersey retired ranged from Rick Barry to the kids helped by Lewis with his work for the Education Goals Opportunities and Sports. Hall of Famer Artis Gilmore described Lewis as "absolutely one of the many (ABA) players that were not acknowledged (enough).” Nancy Leonard, widow of Pacers coach Bobby Leonard, stated that the team would not have won those championships without Lewis there as captain (Leonard made several overtures to team ownership to retire the number of Lewis prior to his death in 2021).

== Career statistics ==
Legend
GP	Games played	GS	Games started	MPG	Minutes per game
FG%	Field goal percentage	3P%	3-point field goal percentage	FT%	Free throw percentage
RPG	Rebounds per game	APG	Assists per game	SPG	Steals per game
BPG	Blocks per game	PPG	Points per game	**Bold**	Career high
*	Led the league

†	Denotes seasons in which Lewis's team won an ABA championship

=== NBA/ABA ===
==== Regular season ====
Year	Team	GP	MPG	FG%	3P%	FT%	RPG	APG	SPG	BPG	PPG
1966–67	Cincinnati	32	10.4	.392		.707	1.4	1.3			4.7
1967–68	Indiana (ABA)	76	38.4	.421	.216	.798	**5.8**	2.4			20.6
1968–69	Indiana (ABA)	78	39.2	.440	.265	.822	4.8	4.4			20.3
1969–70†	Indiana (ABA)	**81**	35.5	.421	.266	.790	3.4	3.6			16.4
1970–71	Indiana (ABA)	**81**	37.5	.441	.304	.807	4.1	5.3			18.8
1971–72†	Indiana (ABA)	77	35.2	.428	.310	.861	4.2	4.7			15.4
1972–73†	Indiana (ABA)	72	30.8	.436	**.345**	.822	3.2	4.0			14.9
1973–74	Indiana (ABA)	78	27.7	.398	.181	.831	2.6	4.1	1.3	**.1**	9.9
1974–75	Memphis (ABA)	6	37.8	.405	.167	**.938**	3.3	3.2	1.7	.0	17.7
1974–75	St. Louis (ABA)	63	**40.7**	**.476**	.279	.840	3.9	**5.5**	**2.2**	.0	**22.6**
1975–76	St. Louis (ABA)	74	30.6	.423	.292	.817	2.9	4.0	1.5	**.1**	14.8
1976–77	Indiana	32	17.4	.407		.805	1.5	1.8	.6	**.1**	7.0
Career (NBA)		64	13.8	.401		.771	1.4	1.5	.6	.1	5.8
Career (ABA)		686	35.0	.433	.280	.819	3.9	4.2	1.6	.1	17.0
Career (overall)		750	33.2	.432	.280	.817	3.7	4.0	1.5	.1	16.0
All-Star (ABA)		3	23.0	.568	.667	.857	2.0	4.7	2.0	.0	16.7

==== Playoffs ====
Year	Team	GP	MPG	FG%	3P%	FT%	RPG	APG	SPG	BPG	PPG
1967	Cincinnati	3	3.0	.444		–	1.3	.0			2.7
1968	Indiana (ABA)	3	38.7	.429	.000	**.966**	**6.3**	2.3			23.3
1969	Indiana (ABA)	17*	42.8	.440	.294	.872	4.1	4.6			24.1
1970†	Indiana (ABA)	14	38.0	.380	**.357**	.836	4.1	3.9			20.4
1971	Indiana (ABA)	11	34.9	.364	.130	.757	4.4	4.7			9.9
1972†	Indiana (ABA)	**20***	40.3	.441	.206	.852	4.1	4.4			19.2
1973†	Indiana (ABA)	18	35.4	.392	.222	.863	3.7	**5.1**			15.5
1974	Indiana (ABA)	14	39.1	.441	.316	.866	3.6	4.4	1.7	**.1**	17.4
1975	St. Louis (ABA)	9	**44.8**	**.483**	.333	.822	5.1	2.9	**1.8**	**.1**	**26.2**
Career (ABA)		106	39.2	.424	.246	.852	4.1	4.3	1.7	.1	19.0
Career (overall)		109	38.2	.424	.246	.852	4.0	4.2	1.7	.1	18.6
