= Billy Paultz =

American basketball player

Personal information
- Born: July 30, 1948 (age 78) River Edge, New Jersey, U.S.
- Listed height: 6 ft 11 in (2.11 m)
- Listed weight: 235 lb (107 kg)

Career information
- High school: River Dell (Oradell, New Jersey)
- College: Cameron (1966–1967); St. John's (1968–1970)
- NBA draft: 1970: 7th round, 103rd overall pick
- Drafted by: San Diego Rockets
- Playing career: 1970–1985
- Position: Center / power forward
- Number: 5

Career history
- 1970–1975: New York Nets
- 1975–1980: San Antonio Spurs
- 1980–1983: Houston Rockets
- 1983: San Antonio Spurs
- 1983–1984: Atlanta Hawks
- 1984–1985: Utah Jazz

Career highlights
- ABA champion (1974); 4× ABA All-Star (1973–1976); ABA blocks leader (1976); ABA All-Time Team

Career NBA statistics
- Points: 13,099 (11.7 ppg)
- Rebounds: 8,959 (8.0 rpg)
- Blocks: 1,457 (1.5 bpg)
- Stats at NBA.com
- Stats at Basketball Reference

William Edward Paultz (born July 30, 1948) is an American former professional basketball player who played in the National Basketball Association (NBA) and in the now defunct American Basketball Association (ABA). Nicknamed "the Whopper", He was a 4-time ABA All-Star and led the ABA in blocks in 1976.

== Early life and collegiate career ==
Born in River Edge, New Jersey, Paultz played high-school basketball at River Dell Regional High School in Bergen County. Paultz played college basketball at Cameron Junior College and then at Saint John's University, and was selected in the seventh round of the 1970 NBA draft by the San Diego Rockets and by the Virginia Squires in the 1970 ABA Draft. Paultz opted to sign with the Squires. On August 11, 1970, the Squires traded his rights to the New York Nets in exchange for a draft choice and cash.

== Professional basketball ==
As a rookie, Paultz made his first postseason appearance in the 1971 ABA Playoffs with the New York Nets, during which he averaged 20.2 points, 15 rebounds, and 3.2 assists per game. On December 17, 1971, Paultz scored 27 points and set a Nets' franchise record by pulling down 33 rebounds in a 90–83 victory over the Dallas Chaparrals. He spent his first five seasons, all of which resulted in trips to the playoffs, with the ABA Nets (including an appearance in 1972 ABA Finals, which the Indiana Pacers won in six games), and was a key player in their 1973–74 ABA championship season. He was traded to the San Antonio Spurs in exchange for forward Rich Jones, center Kim Hughes and guard Bob Warren after the Nets acquired center Swen Nater from the Spurs in a separate trade. He made four consecutive appearances in the playoffs for the Spurs from 1976 to 1979.

Although Paultz moved with a bulky stiffness, he was a heady player who averaged 1.5 blocks/game over 15 professional seasons.

During the middle of the 1979-1980 season, San Antonio traded Paultz to the Houston Rockets, and due to the trade, he managed to play 84 games during an 82-game NBA season. The next year, Paultz teamed with Moses Malone to make the 1981 NBA Finals. In Game 1 of the series, Paultz scored 14 points and grabbed 7 rebounds, during a 98–95 loss to the Celtics (who would win the series four games to two). During the 1982–83 season without Malone, and with the Rockets in last place, he was placed on waivers and picked up by the playoff-bound Spurs. In 1984, he was a late season pickup by the playoff bound Atlanta Hawks. He finished his career with the Utah Jazz in 1985.

A four-time ABA All-Star, Paultz led the ABA in blocked shots during the 1975–76 season with an average of 3.0 blocks per game and a league-leading total of 253 blocked shots.

About his play, Paultz stated, "I have realized that I'm not an overpowering type center. I don't really know what my category is. I have always been the type of player that can do a little bit of everything."
