= Willie Wise =

American basketball player

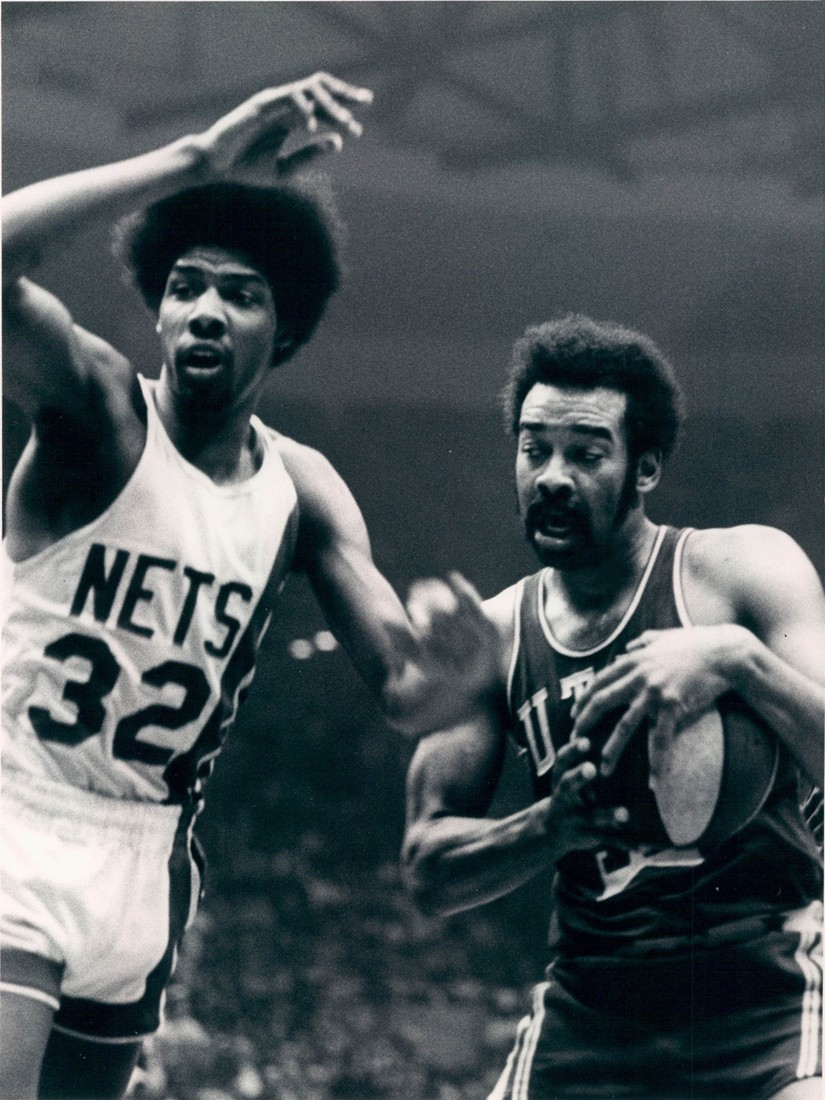
- Wise being guarded by New York Nets player Julius Erving.

Personal information
- Born: March 3, 1947 (age 79) San Francisco, California, U.S.
- Listed height: 6 ft 5 in (1.96 m)
- Listed weight: 210 lb (95 kg)

Career information
- High school: Balboa (San Francisco, California)
- College: CC of San Francisco (1965–1967); Drake (1967–1969)
- NBA draft: 1969: 5th round, 64th overall pick
- Drafted by: San Francisco Warriors
- Playing career: 1969–1977
- Position: Small forward
- Number: 42

Career history
- 1969–1974: Los Angeles / Utah Stars
- 1974–1976: Virginia Squires
- 1976–1977: Denver Nuggets
- 1977: Seattle SuperSonics

Career highlights
- ABA champion (1971); 3× ABA All-Star (1972–1974); 2× All-ABA Second Team (1972, 1974); 2× ABA All-Defensive First Team (1973, 1974); ABA All-Rookie First Team (1970); ABA All-Time Team; No. 42 retired by Drake Bulldogs

Career ABA and NBA statistics
- Points: 9,727 (17.6 ppg)
- Rebounds: 4,578 (8.3 rpg)
- Assists: 1,594 (2.9 apg)
- Stats at NBA.com
- Stats at Basketball Reference

Willie M. Wise (born March 3, 1947) is an American former professional basketball player. After a successful ABA tenure, which eventually resulted in him making the ABA All-Time Team, Wise's NBA career was ended prematurely by a knee injury.

== Career ==
A 6'6" forward from Drake University, Wise earned a spot on the American Basketball Association's (ABA) Los Angeles (later Utah) Stars in 1969. He would prove to be one of the best all-around players in the league, as he was both a proficient scorer (19.2 points per game during his ABA career) and a highly esteemed defender. While playing for the Stars, who won the 1971 ABA Championship, Sports Illustrated described him as "the best two-way performer in pro basketball". Wise later played with the Virginia Squires.

Wise was a prime-time player. During his pro career he saw action in 552 regular-season games and averaged 17.6 points, 8.3 rebounds, 2.9 assists and 1.16 steals. He increased those numbers to 19.8 points, 9.1 rebounds, 3.1 assists and 1.39 in 74 postseason contests. He was a two-time All-ABA Second Team selection and a two-time All-ABA Defensive First Team choice.

After the ABA–NBA merger in 1976, Wise played one full season and part of a second in the National Basketball Association as a member of the Denver Nuggets and Seattle SuperSonics. The SuperSonics waived Wise in November 1977 after he suffered a career-ending knee injury.

On 7 February 2009, Drake University retired Wise's #42 jersey that he wore for the Bulldogs.

== Retirement ==
Wise is among the former ABA players who are fighting the NBA to receive fair treatment from their pension fund.

Wise maintains pride in the way ABA teams played the game and influenced the way the NBA has evolved into a more free-flowing style that resembles the ABA.

"We practically pioneered the Golden State Warriors. The way they play is the way we played in the ’60s and ’70s, and the NBA’s adoption of the 3-point line after much wrangling back and forth — because there were a lot that did not want it because they thought it was just an ABA gimmick to get people into the stands; let’s give them three points for a shot from a certain distance rather than just two, and the old guard in the NBA didn’t want it and fought against it, Red Auerbach being one, Dick Motta from the Bulls being another, and I want to say, but I’m not certain about this one, Jerry Colangelo. There were a number of coaches that fought it and finally the NBA adopted it (for the 1979–80 season), and it just grew and grew…"
