= Roger Brown (basketball, born 1942) =

American basketball player (1942–1997)

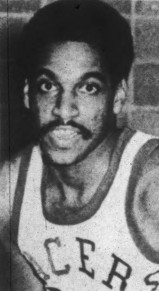
- Brown, circa 1970

Personal information
- Born: May 22, 1942 Brooklyn, New York, U.S.
- Died: March 4, 1997 (aged 54) Indianapolis, Indiana, U.S.
- Listed height: 6 ft 5 in (1.96 m)
- Listed weight: 205 lb (93 kg)

Career information
- High school: George W. Wingate (Brooklyn, New York)
- NBA draft: 1964: undrafted
- Playing career: 1967–1975
- Position: Small forward
- Number: 35, 19, 1
- Coaching career: 1979–1980, 1985–1986

Career history

Playing
- 1967–1974: Indiana Pacers
- 1974: Memphis Sounds
- 1974–1975: Utah Stars
- 1975: Indiana Pacers

Coaching
- 1979–1980: Indiana Pacers (assistant)
- 1985–1986: Evansville Thunder

Career highlights
- 3× ABA champion (1970, 1972, 1973); 1970 ABA Playoffs MVP; 4× ABA All-Star (1968, 1970–1972); All-ABA First Team (1971); 2× All-ABA Second Team (1968, 1970); ABA All-Time Team (1997); No. 35 retired by Indiana Pacers; 2× Third-team Parade All-American (1959, 1960)

Career ABA statistics
- Points: 10,498 (17.4 ppg)
- Rebounds: 3,758 (6.2 rpg)
- Assists: 2,315 (3.8 apg)
- Stats at Basketball Reference
- Basketball Hall of Fame

Roger William Brown (May 22, 1942 – March 4, 1997) was an American professional basketball player and councilman.

A noted player even in high school, Brown exceled for Wingate high in Brooklyn in the late 1950s before being set to play for the University of Dayton in 1960. However, he never got to play in college because he was falsely implicated for point shaving due to being introduced to a known gambler, although he was never accused of point shaving. Not being able to play college or pro basketball for a time, he played in the Amateur Athletic Union (AAU) for various teams in the 1960s while also working at General Motors. In 1967, he found his way to the professional leagues when the Indiana Pacers of the upstart American Basketball Association signed him.

He quickly became a star in the league, excelling with the 3-point play along with dominating teams with his play that saw him nicknamed "The Man with a Thousand Moves" along with "The Rajah". In the 1969 ABA playoffs, he averaged over 25 points as the Pacers lost in the ABA Finals, the first of five trips with Brown on the roster. The following year saw him average over 28 points a game in the playoff run as the Pacers won their first ever ABA championship, with his average stat line of 28 points, 10 rebounds and 5 assists in the championship series being a record for decades. From 1967 to 1974, the Pacers won three championships with Brown on the team that saw him named to the All-Star team four times. Injuries to his knee and back limited him in his later years that saw him retire from the league in 1975 at the age of 32 in the penultimate season of the ABA before it merged with the NBA. Alongside his teammate George McGinnis and Mel Daniels, Brown's number was retired on November 2, 1985, as the first numbers retired by the Pacers; the team has only retired one jersey for a player since that day.

As an active player, Brown ran for Indianapolis City-County Council in 1971 and won election, where he served from 1972 to 1976. He did work for Marion County in his later years prior to his death in 1996. One of seven unanimous player selections to the ABA All-Time Team in 1997, Brown was finally inducted to the Naismith Memorial Basketball Hall of Fame in 2013.

== High school ==
A 6-foot-5-inch (1.96 m) forward/guard, Brown starred at Brooklyn's George W. Wingate High School. Brown, alongside Connie Hawkins of Boys High, were among the top players in the area of New York City, if not the whole nation. Wingate and Boys High faced off to 11,000 fans on March 15, 1960, in the Public Schools Athletic League semifinals. Brown scored 39 points and managed to get Hawkins to foul out of the game, although Boys High won the game.

== College career ==
Brown signed to play for the University of Dayton in 1960, but he was banned from the National Collegiate Athletic Association (NCAA) and National Basketball Association (NBA) when it was revealed that while still in high school and along with fellow Brooklyn star Connie Hawkins, he had been introduced to a gambler, Jack Molinas, who was involved in illegal point shaving. Brown was never accused of point shaving and his only crime was associating with Molinas.

Brown, then in New York, wanted to leave the state and found his way back to Dayton in the summer that he was banned to see if he could stay with some people for a time. Azariah and Arlena Smith agreed to let him stay with them, and they helped him find a job at the assembly line at the General Motors plant near their house along with AAU play. Brown played in the Amateur Athletic Union (AAU) for Inland during the 1961–62 season, the Dayton All-Stars during the 1962–63 season and the Jones Brothers Morticians during the 1963–64 season. He stayed with the Smiths for a few years before eventually getting an apartment in town, but he never stopped his association with the Smiths, even calling them to share his happiness at being named as the first player of a new franchise in the American Basketball Association with the Indiana Pacers.

== Professional career ==
With the NCAA and NBA ban in place, he continued to play basketball in Dayton's amateur leagues, and in 1967 signed with the American Basketball Association (ABA)'s Indiana Pacers. He was the first player the Pacers organization signed when they were formed, as general manager Mike Storen was told by Oscar Robertson that Brown, alongside Connie Hawkins, were the "two best players in America not in the NBA". At that time, Brown was working at General Motors and playing AAU basketball and had initial doubts about leaving the job for the new league. He was later convinced about the league's viability and signed for $17,000 and got help in finding his wife a job in Indianapolis along with use of a car for a year.

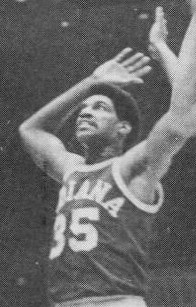
Brown in 1970 as a member of the Indiana Pacers

Over his eight-year (1967–1975) ABA career, spent with the Pacers, Memphis Sounds, and Utah Stars, Brown scored 10,498 points and appeared in four All-Star games.

Brown particularly enjoyed taking the big shot, noting in Loose Balls that the "ABA 3-point play was made for me". Ironically, he stated he played with terrible eyesight, as he could not actually see the rim when taking a jump shot, merely just seeing orange on the backboard (this worked just as well when playing in arenas with less lighting as he was used to playing in New York playgrounds where all he could see was the outline of the rim). One nickname he earned was "The Man with a Thousand Moves". He also was known as "The Rajah".

On March 11, 1969, Brown set a Pacers franchise record with 46 points scored in a single game, during a win over the New York Nets. That postseason, during the 1969 ABA Finals, Brown averaged 25.6 points, 6.6 rebounds, and 2.6 assists a game, in a five-game series loss to Warren Jabali and the Oakland Oaks. The following postseason, during the 1970 ABA Playoffs, Brown was named Playoffs MVP after he averaged a postseason career best 28.5 points a game before the Pacers won the ABA Finals over the Los Angeles Stars in a postseason where Indiana lost just three playoff games (once on the road). He scored 53 points in Game 4 (after the Pacers had won two of the first three games), a franchise record for a playoff game. In Game 6, Brown scored 45 points and grabbed 11 rebounds in a decisive victory. He was the first player (NBA or ABA) to average 28 points, 10 rebounds, and five assists in the playoffs and win a championship, a mark not matched for decades. He stated his pride at winning it: “I'm not bitter anymore. I think I’ve found a home. This championship is what every kid, every man looks for. The ABA is truly professional, in every sense of the word.” By this point, fans at the Indiana Fairgrounds could be found chanting "Roger, Roger, Roger" in late-game situations with Brown having the ball. Brown once had a perfect streak in the span of three games that saw him make 21 consecutive field goals.

Brown would go on to win two more championships with the Pacers. The 1972 Finals saw him score 32 points (which led all scorers) in Game 6 to help clinch the ABA championship over the New York Nets on the road. The NBA later reinstated Brown, but he chose to never play in the league. Aching knees and a back injury led to a decrease in production by 1974, when he was just 32. The 1974–75 season saw him play 56 games but split for three teams (Memphis Sounds, Utah Stars, Indiana Pacers); he averaged 8.7 points, 3.1 rebounds, and two assists. In the final games he played as a player, Brown played 182 total minutes in 15 games of the 1975 ABA Playoffs as the Pacers went all the way to the ABA Finals. He played six minutes in the decisive Game 5, logging one shot attempt that he made in the 110–105 loss. He retired after the season ended.

== Legacy ==
Former ABA beat reporter Mike Littwin called the league one that "was Roger Brown's league". Pacers head coach Bobby Leonard stated that Brown “always came up big and he would tell you, when money's on the line, I'll be there." In the ABA, Brown played in a Game 7 eight times, the most for all players in the history of the league. Brown was one of seven players unanimously selected to the ABA All-Time Team in 1997. He is also one of four players (the others are Mel Daniels, George McGinnis, and Reggie Miller, with Miller currently being the only Pacer to not have his number retired while with the team during their ABA days) to have his jersey (#35) retired by the Pacers as of 2025. In 2013, a documentary about his life was released called Undefeated: The Roger Brown Story for broadcast on PBS.

On February 15, 2013, Brown was announced as one of five direct inductees to join the Naismith Memorial Basketball Hall of Fame, having been elected by the Hall's ABA Committee. Several people were present to watch the ceremony in Springfield, such as Smith, several Pacers teammates, both of Brown's ex-wives alongside of his children Roger, Stacey, Destiny, and Gayle while Reggie Miller and teammate Mel Daniels presented for Brown. He was inducted in September 2013.

Fellow Pacers legend Reggie Miller considers Brown the greatest player to never play in the NBA and also calls him the "greatest Pacer ever".

== Later life and death ==
During his basketball career, at the suggestion of his attorney, Brown ran for Indianapolis City-County Council in 1971 as a Republican and won, becoming the first pro athlete in the state to hold public office. During that time, he also served as a deputy coroner for Marion County and a sheriff's horse patrolman. He served on the city council from 1972 to 1976. He later served as an sheriff's honorary deputy in Marion County.

On January 29, 1985, Brown was announced as the head coach for the Evansville Thunder of the Continental Basketball Association (CBA). He accumulated a 32–25 record during his two seasons in the position.

Brown is the father of seven children. Roger Jr., Stacey Brown Hicks, Rodney, Malissa Brown, Gayle Brown, Destiny Brown and Roger. He was diagnosed with colon cancer in 1996 and died the following year. His funeral procession was led to the cemetery by the sheriff's horse patrol, which included his teammate Mel Daniels. A fund was established in his name to assist with his medical expenses. When he died, the fund (now called the Roger Brown Legacy Fund) was modified to assist former teammates in need. He is buried in Indianapolis at Crown Hill Cemetery.

Even in his later years, Brown had no hard feelings about Dayton, stating his love for the university in an interview. In 2019, the University of Dayton announced that annual residency would be created in honor of Brown. The Roger Brown Residency in Social Justice, Writing and Sport is described as "an opportunity for a distinguished writer to engage the University and wider Dayton community in a conversation about the intersections of athletics, literature, and justice."

== See also ==
- List of NBA retired numbers
- List of people banned or suspended by the NBA
