= Warren Jabali =

American basketball player

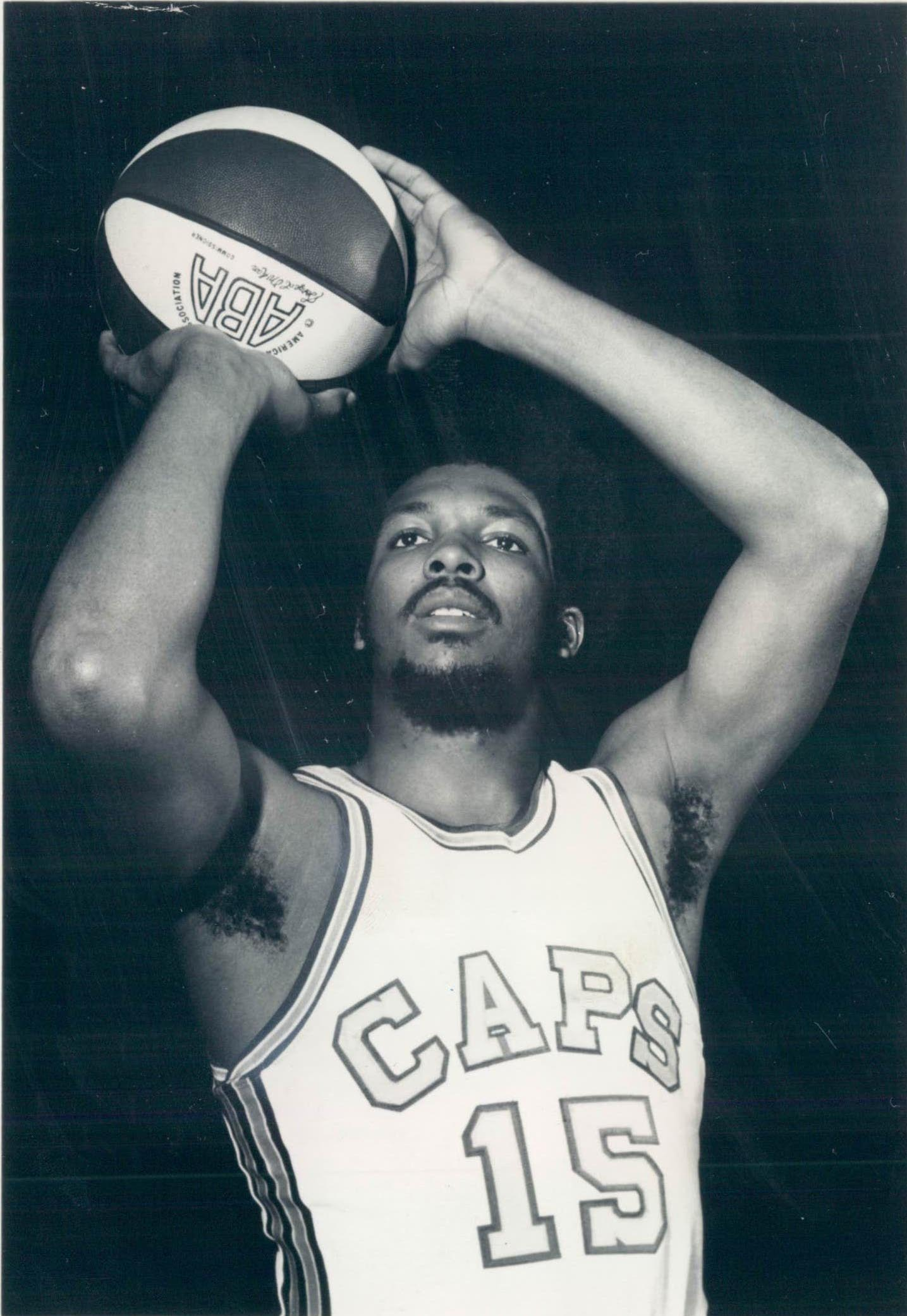
- Jabali with the Washington Caps during the 1969–70 season

Personal information
- Born: August 29, 1946 Kansas City, Kansas, U.S.
- Died: July 13, 2012 (aged 65) Miami, Florida, U.S.
- Listed height: 6 ft 2 in (1.88 m)
- Listed weight: 200 lb (91 kg)

Career information
- High school: Central (Kansas City, Missouri)
- College: Wichita State (1965–1968)
- NBA draft: 1968: 4th round, 44th overall pick
- Drafted by: New York Knicks
- Playing career: 1968–1975
- Position: Shooting guard / point guard
- Number: 15, 31, 12, 2

Career history
- 1968–1970: Oakland Oaks / Washington Caps
- 1970–1971: Indiana Pacers
- 1971–1972: The Floridians
- 1972–1974: Denver Rockets
- 1974–1975: San Diego Conquistadors

Career highlights
- ABA champion (1969); ABA All-Time Team; 4x ABA All-Star (1970, 1972–1974); All-ABA First Team (1973); ABA Rookie of the Year (1969); ABA Playoffs Most Valuable Player Award (1969); ABA All-Star Game MVP (1973); 3× First-team All-MVC (1966–1968)

Career ABA statistics
- Points: 7,666 (17.1 ppg)
- Rebounds: 2,985 (6.7 rpg)
- Assists: 2,389 (5.3 apg)
- Stats at Basketball Reference

Warren Jabali (born Warren Edward Armstrong; August 29, 1946 – July 13, 2012) was an American basketball player. He played professionally in the American Basketball Association (ABA) from 1968 to 1975.

== Early career ==
Jabali changed his name while attending Wichita State University to reflect his African roots. The name does not have any religious connotations as it is a Swahili word for "rock." A skilled defender and rebounder and a remarkable leaper, the 6'2" Jabali was reported to be able to touch a ten-foot high basketball rim with his forehead. Although Wichita State, and the Missouri Valley Conference in general, supplied many pro players of the era, he did not receive much attention from the National Basketball Association (NBA). He was drafted by the New York Knicks in the 4th round (8th pick, 44th overall) of the 1968 NBA draft; he signed instead with the Oakland Oaks of the rival ABA, who selected him in the 1968 ABA Draft.

== ABA career ==
Armstrong was drafted by the Oakland Oaks and the New York Knicks in 1968; he elected to play with the Oaks, then coached by Alex Hannum. The severe knee ligament injury to Rick Barry after 35 games did not slow the Oaks, who would win 60 games that year, a 38-game turnaround from the previous season. In his first season in the ABA, Armstrong won Rookie of the Year honors, prompting teammate Rick Barry to comment, "No doubt he's one of the best guards I've ever played with—or against". Later that season, he averaged 33.2 points against the Indiana Pacers in the 1969 ABA Finals and was named Playoffs MVP. It was during 1969 that he elected to change his name to Jabali. A year later at midseason, with the team playing as the Washington Caps, an injury sidelined Jabali. Hurt shortly after playing in his first of four ABA All-Star Games, he was carrying an average of 22.8 points per game at the time.

As one of the most physically gifted guards in the American Basketball Association, Jabali muscled his way through seven straight seasons of double-digit scoring, including 1968–69, when his average of 21.5 points per game earned him ABA Rookie of the Year honors. That season Jabali's efforts helped bring an ABA Championship to the Oakland Oaks, a team that also featured Rick Barry, Larry Brown, and Doug Moe. A physical intimidator with his frame, Jabali became infamous for his stomping of Jim Jarvis during a game, a moment he expressed regret over.

Jabali made a comeback, although his final five years were spent with four teams. In his first season back, 1970–71, he was traded from the Kentucky Colonels to the Indiana Pacers on October 13, 1970, in exchange for a first-round draft choice and cash. Jabali saw action in 62 games with the Pacers. It was with the Pacers that Jabali started pulling the trigger from three-point land; he did it 163 times that year, making 47 treys.

He had a big year with the Florida Floridians the following season, averaging 19.9 points and hitting 102 of his 286 three-point attempts, among the most in the league. When the Miami-based franchise folded, Jabali moved to the Denver Rockets (later the Denver Nuggets). During his first campaign with the Rockets, Jabali's 16-point effort in the 1973 ABA All-Star Game keyed the West's come-from-behind victory and earned him Most Valuable Player honors. The award, which came with a free airline ticket to anywhere in Europe, had him reply famously state, "I want to go to Africa. If they won’t send me to Africa, I want the money instead of the ticket.”

He spent one more season in Denver before being cut and put on waivers despite leading the league in assists (he quarreled with head coach Alex Hannum); reportedly, he was not claimed by any team because his Muslim views upset the ABA establishment. Months later, he signed with the San Diego Conquistadors. On February 14, 1975, he participated in the longest game in league history, a quadruple OT game against the New York Nets that saw him be switched from guard to forward to go against Julius Erving of the New York Nets (who scored 63 points). Jabali scored 19 of his 23 points at the end of regulation and in overtime, including six key points in the final overtime to help San Diego win 176–166. Jabali retired in 1975 at the age of 28.

In his seven-year professional career, Jabali played for the Oakland Oaks, Washington Capitals, the Indiana Pacers, The Floridians, the Denver Rockets, and the San Diego Conquistadors. While playing for the Rockets in 1973, he was named the All-Star Game MVP and was named to the All-ABA First Team after averaging 17.0 points, 6.6 assists, and 5.2 rebounds. Knee problems would soon limit his effectiveness, however, and he retired in 1975, having achieved career averages of 17.1 points, 5.3 assists, and 6.7 rebounds. Regarding his intimidation, Jabali once stated, "You test folks. If you can get your opponent to the point where they’re so concerned about what you’re going to do and reluctant to play their game, you’ve got them. It makes life easier for you on the court. Guys are scared of you and hesitate before they make a move. They won’t drive [to the hoop] because they want to see if you’re around first.”

== Personal life ==
For a time, Jabali expressed interest in living in Africa. He moved to Tanzania for a time but found that the locals did not respect people of his ilk and therefore moved back to the States.

After his career ended, he became a K-8 teacher at North County K-8 Center in Carol City and guidance counselor while also establishing a midnight basketball league called the Overtown Midnight Basketball League. He would visit basketball courts in the inner city on Sunday mornings to encourage former participants to stay straight and would even drive to various parks to sit in the stands to watch games for kids who didn't have their parents there. One person who credited Jabali as a mentor was Andre Johnson, who would give him considerable conversations when he got into trouble as a youth. Jabali had open heart surgery in February 2011 but elected to not retire, believing that his work wasn't done yet. Jabali died on July 13, 2012, of heart failure. Services were held in Miami Gardens before he was laid to rest in Kansas City, Kansas. In 2013, Thanks To You: Memories of Warren Edward Armstrong Jabali, a biography by Mary Alice Beasley, was released.

== ABA career statistics ==
Legend
GP	Games played	GS	Games started	MPG	Minutes per game
FG%	Field goal percentage	3P%	3-point field goal percentage	FT%	Free throw percentage
RPG	Rebounds per game	APG	Assists per game	SPG	Steals per game
BPG	Blocks per game	PPG	Points per game	**Bold**	Career high

†	Denotes seasons in which Jabali won an ABA championship

=== Regular season ===
Year	Team	GP	GS	MPG	FG%	3P%	FT%	RPG	APG	SPG	BPG	PPG
1968–69	Oakland	71	...	35.8	.449	.250	.684	9.7	3.5	...	...	21.5
1969–70	Washington	40	...	37.8	.445	.306	.717	**10.4**	4.3	...	...	**22.8**
1970–71	Indiana	62	...	25.6	.410	.288	.761	4.8	3.5	...	...	11.0
1971–72	Miami	81	...	**40.9**	.436	.358	.756	8.1	6.1	...	...	19.9
1972–73	Denver	**82**	...	33.4	**.453**	.257	**.805**	5.2	6.6	**2.1**	...	17.0
1973–74	Denver	49	...	34.9	.391	**.366**	.803	5.0	**7.3**	2.0	.2	15.9
1974–75	San Diego	62	...	30.0	.392	.321	.789	4.1	5.8	1.8	**.3**	12.1
Career		447	...	34.1	.431	.319	.756	6.7	5.3	2.0	.3	17.1

=== Playoffs ===
Year	Team	GP	GS	MPG	FG%	3P%	FT%	RPG	APG	SPG	BPG	PPG
1968–69	Oakland	**16**	...	41.4	**.460**	.176	.668	12.9	2.9	...	...	**28.8**
1970–71	Indiana	11	...	22.7	.302	.107	**.806**	3.6	3.0	...	...	7.8
1971–72	Miami	4	...	**42.8**	.373	**.333**	.788	**13.0**	**5.5**	...	...	18.8
1972–73	Denver	5	...	25.2	.333	.000	.750	1.4	2.8	...	...	6.0
Career		36	...	33.6	.415	.167	.702	8.5	3.2	...	...	18.1
