= Mack Calvin =

American basketball player (born 1947)

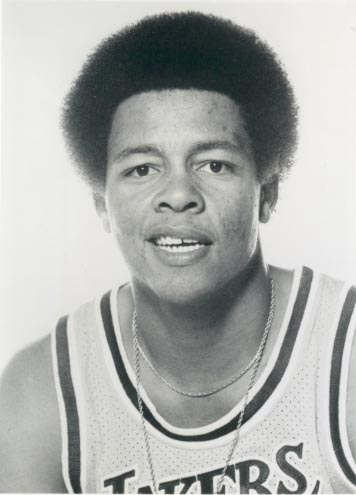
- Calvin with the Los Angeles Lakers, c. 1976

Personal information
- Born: July 27, 1947 (age 79) Fort Worth, Texas, U.S.
- Listed height: 6 ft 0 in (1.83 m)
- Listed weight: 165 lb (75 kg)

Career information
- High school: Long Beach Polytechnic (Long Beach, California)
- College: Long Beach CC (1965–1967); USC (1967–1969)
- NBA draft: 1969: 14th round, 187th overall pick
- Drafted by: Los Angeles Lakers
- Playing career: 1969–1981
- Position: Point guard
- Number: 20, 21, 24, 33
- Coaching career: 1975, 1987–1992

Career history

Playing
- 1969–1970: Los Angeles Stars
- 1970–1972: The Floridians
- 1972–1974: Carolina Cougars
- 1974–1975: Denver Nuggets
- 1975–1976: Virginia Squires
- 1976: Los Angeles Lakers
- 1976–1977: San Antonio Spurs
- 1977–1978: Denver Nuggets
- 1979–1980: Utah Jazz
- 1980–1981: Cleveland Cavaliers

Coaching
- 1975: Virginia Squires
- 1987–1991: Milwaukee Bucks (assistant)
- 1991–1992: Los Angeles Clippers (assistant)
- 1992: Los Angeles Clippers (interim)

Career highlights
- 5× ABA All-Star (1971–1975); 3x All-ABA First Team (1971, 1974, 1975); All-ABA Second Team (1973); ABA All-Rookie First Team (1970); ABA All-Time Team; First-team All-Pac-8 (1969)

Career ABA and NBA statistics
- Points: 12,172 (16.1 ppg)
- Rebounds: 1,923 (2.5 rpg)
- Assists: 3,617 (4.8 apg)
- Stats at NBA.com
- Stats at Basketball Reference

Mack Calvin (born July 27, 1947) is an American former basketball player. He is considered one of the best players to play in the American Basketball Association (ABA).

Calvin excelled in his final season in the collegiate level for USC but was only selected in the 14th round of the NBA draft in 1969. He elected to play in the area for the upstart Los Angeles Stars of the American Basketball Association. Despite reaching the ABA Finals in his one season with the team, he was traded to The Floridians, where he played for the next two seasons. Calvin would play for five different ABA teams in seven seasons while also being named an All-Star five times. His 3,067 assists were the second most in ABA history. He played for five further teams after the ABA-NBA merger, closing his career out in 1981 with the Cleveland Cavaliers.

One of nine players to be named to the ABA All-Star Game five times, Calvin was selected to the ABA All-Time Team in 1997.

== High school career ==
Calvin was born in Fort Worth, Texas and attended Long Beach Poly in California.

== College career ==
A 6'0" point guard from Long Beach City College and the University of Southern California, Calvin was a 14th-round draft pick of the NBA's Los Angeles Lakers in 1969.

In his final college season, Calvin and his Trojans defeated the UCLA Bruins, 46–44, in Pauley Pavilion, ending several of the Bruins' consecutive win streaks: 17 straight over USC, 41 in a row overall, 45 consecutive in Pacific-8 Conference play, and 51 straight at Pauley.

== Professional career ==
He played seven seasons (1969–1976) in the now-defunct American Basketball Association (ABA) and four seasons in the National Basketball Association (NBA).

Calvin began his professional career with the ABA's Los Angeles Stars, averaging 16.8 points per game in his first regular season to make the ABA All-Rookie Team. Despite finishing 43–41, in the 1970 ABA Playoffs Calvin, George Stone, and Craig Raymond, helped the Stars make an unexpected trip to the ABA Finals. On the way there, during a win over the Dallas Chaparrals in the division semifinals, Mack scored a postseason career high 44 points, while adding 16 assists. In the finals, Calvin averaged 15.8 points and 5 assists per game during a 4–2 series loss to Roger Brown and the Indiana Pacers. The following season, he averaged a career-high 27.2 points for The Floridians, in the process setting the ABA records for most free throws made (696) and most free throws attempted (805) in one season. During the 1974-75 ABA season, Calvin helped the Nuggets to a 65–19 record by averaging 7.7 assists per game, both of which were best in the league. However, in the Western Division Finals, Denver was eliminated by Indiana in a seven-game series. In 1976, Calvin was traded to the Virginia Squires (alongside Jan van Breda Kolff and Mike Green) and $250,000 for George Irvine and David Thompson. Wracked with a knee injury that meant he couldn't play with a team disintegrating, he was asked to coach the Squires, which he did for six games. In total during his ABA career, Calvin tallied 10,620 points and 3,067 assists (second in ABA history behind only Louie Dampier's 4,044) and appeared in 5 All-Star games.

Calvin joined the Lakers for the 1976–77 NBA season but saw a sharp decline in playing time. He was able to match the same level of production per minute he reached while in the ABA, though. He spent his four seasons in the NBA with five teams—the Lakers, the San Antonio Spurs, the Denver Nuggets (which had joined the NBA in 1976), the Utah Jazz, and the Cleveland Cavaliers. In the 1978 NBA Playoffs, during his second Denver tenure, Calvin and the Nuggets made it to the Western Conference Finals, before being eliminated by the Seattle SuperSonics. Calvin retired in 1981 with an NBA career scoring-average of 7.0 points per game.

== Legacy ==
In 1997, Calvin was selected as one of thirty players to the ABA All-Time Team, as voted on by a 50-person panel including ABA media, referees, owners and front-office executives. He received 41 votes, putting him 10th, behind nine members of the Naismith Basketball Hall of Fame.

Calvin has made a push for being inducted into the Hall in recent years, although it has not been successful as of 2025.

== Coaching career ==
He coached Virginia Squires in the ABA (1975–76) for six games and Los Angeles Clippers in the NBA (1991–92, as an interim head coach in February 1992 for two games).

== Head coaching record ==
=== ABA ===
Team	Year	G	W	L	W–L%	Finish	PG	PW	PL	PW–L%	Result
Virginia	1975–76	6	0	6	.000	(interim)	—	—	—	—	Missed playoffs
Career		2	1	1	.500		0	0	0	–	

=== NBA ===
Team	Year	G	W	L	W–L%	Finish	PG	PW	PL	PW–L%	Result
LA Clippers	1991–92	2	1	1	.500	(interim)	—	—	—	—	Missed playoffs
Career		2	1	1	.500		0	0	0	–	
