= Ralph Simpson =

American basketball player (born 1949)

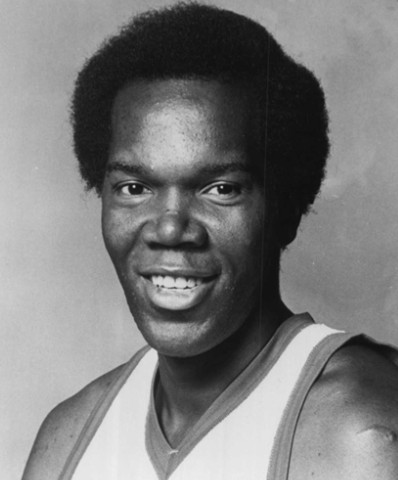

Personal information
- Born: August 10, 1949 (age 77) Detroit, Michigan, U.S.
- Listed height: 6 ft 5 in (1.96 m)
- Listed weight: 200 lb (91 kg)

Career information
- High school: Southeastern (Detroit, Michigan); Pershing (Detroit, Michigan)
- College: Michigan State (1969–1970)
- NBA draft: 1972: 1st round, 11th overall pick
- Drafted by: Chicago Bulls
- Playing career: 1970–1979
- Position: Shooting guard / small forward
- Number: 44, 10, 32,

Career history

Playing
- 1970–1976: Denver Rockets / Nuggets
- 1976–1978: Detroit Pistons
- 1978: Denver Nuggets
- 1978–1979: Philadelphia 76ers
- 1979: New Jersey Nets

Coaching
- 1985–1987: Metro State (assistant)

Career highlights
- 5× ABA All-Star (1972–1976); All-ABA First Team (1976); 2× All-ABA Second Team (1972, 1973); Third-team All-American – NABC (1970); First-team Parade All-American (1968)

Career ABA and NBA statistics
- Points: 11,785 (16.7 ppg)
- Rebounds: 2,616 (3.7 rpg)
- Assists: 2,357 (3.3 apg)
- Stats at NBA.com
- Stats at Basketball Reference

Ralph Derek Simpson (born August 10, 1949) is an American former basketball player. He played professionally in the American Basketball Association (ABA) and National Basketball Association (NBA) from 1970 to 1980.

== Career ==
Simpson, a 6'6" guard/forward, was a star at Detroit's Pershing High School, where he teamed with Spencer Haywood to win the Michigan state championship in 1967. He was offered a tryout for the 1968 United States Olympic team, but turned it down. After two strong years at Michigan State University, he signed a professional contract with the ABA's Denver Rockets (later the Denver Nuggets), and he would represent the franchise in five ABA All-Star games.

Simpson had his finest season in 1971–1972, in which he averaged 27.4 points, 4.7 rebounds, and 3.1 assists. After the ABA–NBA merger in 1976, Simpson joined the Detroit Pistons, but his level of production dropped significantly, from 18 points per game in 1975–1976 to 11 points per game in 1976–1977, and after one-and-a-half seasons, he returned to the Denver Nuggets, now one of the ABA teams who had joined the NBA. However, he averaged only 5.5 points during his second tenure with the Nuggets, and after two more seasons as a member of the Philadelphia 76ers and New Jersey Nets, he retired in 1980.

Simpson scored 11,785 combined ABA/NBA points in his ten-year career. His 9,953 points were the most for the Nuggets during the team's time in the ABA.

== Personal life ==
Simpson currently lives in Denver, Colorado. His daughter is Grammy Award-winning soul singer India Arie. In a 2025 podcast, his ex-wife accused him of assaulting both her and their famous daughter 45 years prior.
