= 1967 ABA draft =

Basketball player selection

General information
- Sport: Basketball
- Date: April 2, 1967
- Location: Oakland, California

Overview
- 130 total selections in 12 rounds
- League: American Basketball Association
- Teams: 11 (3 inaugural teams later rebranding after the draft)
- First selection: Jimmy Walker, Indiana Pacers

The 1967 ABA draft was the first draft done by the American Basketball Association (ABA), an upstart rivaling league to the National Basketball Association (NBA) that they would eventually merge with as a part of the NBA nearly a decade later. This fledgling draft was held as a "secret draft" after the conclusion of a three-day-long league's meeting ironing out the finer details regarding most (though not every part) of the new league in question for the upcoming months, such as replacing an originally planned ABA team held in Kansas City, Missouri with one that would operate out in Denver, Colorado that eventually became the Denver Rockets (now known as the Denver Nuggets) and later deciding upon whether to add a new ABA team in the city of Milwaukee (which they ultimately decided not to do, likely because that city alongside Phoenix, Arizona would be the two locations chosen for the NBA's expansion the following year in 1968). After concluding their meeting on April 2, 1967, the eleven team owners (which included three franchises who were officially operating under tentative names at the time, retroactively speaking) would take turns selecting amateur U.S. college basketball players. A player who had finished his four-year college eligibility (or was close to finishing his four-year college eligibility) at the time of this draft was eligible for selection. If a player left college early, he would not be considered eligible for selection until his college class graduated, though the ABA would take exception to certain players at hand, if deemed necessary on their end. 130 players were selected in the draft. Due to this being the first season of the ABA existing, the new league would determine the draft ordering of teams by a draft lottery for the first round (which the Indiana Pacers won) with the reverse ordering of the lottery being the official draft order for the second round, followed by a new draft lottery for the third round (alongside territorial picks for certain teams that round) then resulting in the reverse ordering of that being the fourth round's draft order, with subsequent odd-numbered rounds resulting in a new random rounding order and subsequent even-numbered rounds resulting in the reversal of that previous round's ordering in question. However, the proper draft order listing for this year's ABA draft would not be made publicly available as of 2025.

== Draftee career notes ==
Jimmy Walker from Providence College was selected first overall by the Indiana Pacers. In addition to him being selected as the #1 pick by both the ABA and NBA, he was also drafted in the 1967 National Football League (NFL) Draft, despite never having played college football. He was drafted last in the 17-round draft by the New Orleans Saints. Earl Monroe from Winston-Salem State University, who went on to win the NBA Rookie of the Year Award, was drafted somewhere in the first round by the Pittsburgh Pipers, who would later win the first ever ABA championship. Of the players drafted by the ABA this year, Monroe, Walt Frazier, Louie Dampier, and Mel Daniels have been inducted into the Naismith Basketball Hall of Fame for the work they have done as players either in the ABA or the rivaling NBA, with two of these players also being named as both the 50 Greatest Players in NBA History and NBA 75th Anniversary Team and the other two players being named as members of the ABA All-Time Team. In addition to them, both Phil Jackson and Pat Riley became very successful head coaches in the NBA following their careers spent in the NBA, becoming Hall of Fame worthy coaches (and an executive in the case of Pat Riley) in the process. Not only that, but the post-draft period saw ABA commissioner George Mikan allow for some players that had previously been banned by the NBA due to their apparent involvement in the 1961 NCAA University Division men's basketball gambling scandal, such as Doug Moe, Tony Jackson, Charlie Williams (who would play in college until graduating in 1965, but was barred from playing in the NBA afterward), and future Hall of Famers Roger Brown and Connie Hawkins to all get second chances in the ABA, with each of them even being named All-Stars there at least once throughout their careers.

Three out of six players that had played throughout the ABA's entire existence (Byron Beck of the Denver Rockets (later becoming the Nuggets), Louie Dampier of the Kentucky Colonels, and Bob Netolicky of the Indiana Pacers) were taken through this year's draft period by teams that selected them, with Byron Beck and Louie Dampier being the only players to stay with the teams that first drafted them throughout the ABA's entire existence up until the ABA-NBA merger came to pass in 1976, with Beck staying with the Denver franchise once they made it to the NBA. (The other three players to have played throughout the entirety of the ABA's existence, Gerald Govan, Stew Johnson, and Freddie Lewis, had previously been drafted by the NBA in prior years before entering the ABA, with Lewis also previously entering the NBA in 1966 and later returning to the NBA following the ABA-NBA merger.) Interestingly, Byron Beck would be drafted by the Denver Rockets while previously going to the University of Denver, while Louie Dampier would be drafted by the Kentucky Colonels while previously attending the University of Kentucky. Louie Dampier and Mel Daniels would see the most ABA All-Star selections throughout the entire league's existence at seven appearances each (out of nine overall games). Twelve players who were draft eligible this year (out of 92 overall ABA All-Stars) would make it to at least one ABA All-Star Game, with ten of them actually being drafted from this year's ABA draft specifically (Louie Dampier, Mel Daniels, Jimmy Jones, Bob Netolicky, Byron Beck, Rich Jones, Bob Verga, George Carter, Randolph Mahaffey, and Trooper Washington were selected in the ABA draft this year), while only Larry Bunce and DeWitt Menyard were both able to make it to the inaugural ABA All-Star Game despite going undrafted in the ABA this year. Mel Daniels also had five total All-ABA Team selections (one of which happened during his rookie year and his first four spots being First Team selections), while Louie Dampier had four total All-ABA Second Team selections (one of which also was during his rookie year) and Jimmy Jones had three total All-ABA First Team selections; Daniels and Dampier later became two out of nine ABA players to join an All-ABA Team while playing their rookie seasons in the ABA, while all three of these players also tied three other players for the most All-ABA Team appearances in each of their respective spots throughout the league's existence. Daniels also won the ABA's inaugural Rookie of the Year Award in 1968, as well as became a two-time MVP for the ABA in 1969 and 1971 and was named the ABA All-Star Game's MVP in 1971 despite his team losing that year (one of two All-Star MVPs in the ABA being named for the losing squad), with him also being one of three different ABA players to have his number retired by the Pacers (four players overall retired as of 2025). This year would also see multiple football players get selected from this year's ABA draft with the aforementioned Jimmy Walker from the Indiana Pacers being a Mr. Irrelevant selection for the New Orleans Saints, Gene Washington from the Indiana Pacers being selected either at or near the end of the ABA draft joining the Minnesota Vikings instead, and Ron Widby from the New Orleans Buccaneers foregoing his professional basketball career to become a punter for the Dallas Cowboys after a season of play. Another New Orleans Buccaneers selection in Bob Seagren would also later become an Olympic gold medalist in pole vaulting for the 1968 Summer Olympics in Mexico City alongside a silver medalist in the 1972 Summer Olympics in Munich, West Germany.

== Historic draft notes ==
No generally known record of which player was taken in which draft round outside of Jimmy Walker as the #1 pick and Bob Netolicky as the 22nd pick by the Indiana Pacers, as well as the first round pick of the Kentucky Colonels, the first round pick of the Minnesota Muskies, the first round pick of the New Jersey Americans, the first round pick of the New Orleans Buccaneers, the first and fourth round picks of the Pittsburgh Pipers, the first five round picks of the Denver Rockets, and the entire draft ordering of the Dallas Chaparrals was publicly kept throughout the ABA's inaugural draft history as of 2025. The reason for this was related to this draft being held in secret at the end of the league's three day long meetings held in Oakland, California (home of one of the founding ABA teams) on April 2, especially since it related to the league trying to sign top-tier college-level talents to join their league over the NBA through a range of behind-the-scenes strategies. (Following that period of time, the team currently known now as the Denver Nuggets went by the initial name of the Denver Larks at the time (with ABA co-founder Dennis Murphy at one point thinking of expanding that team name to the Denver Lark Buntings instead of just having the team name stay as the Larks) after previously ditching their original plans to play in Kansas City, Missouri due to a lack of suitable home arenas to play in before later changing their team name to the Denver Rockets before the start of the season due to ownership changes brought up by the newer owners led by Denver's local Ringsby Rocket Truck Lines company; the team currently known now as the Brooklyn Nets initially went by the name of the New Jersey Freighters at first due to one of the owners also being the President of nearby Manhattan's ABC Freight Forwarding Company at the time before later becoming the New York Americans and then ultimately entered their inaugural season as the New Jersey Americans due to there being no suitable arenas in New York at the time for them; and the team that later became the Oakland Oaks to start out their ABA tenure originally started out as the Oakland Americans at the time before a dispute with the New Jersey later turned into a future New York franchise led to the Oakland franchise originally trying to change their team name to the Jacks (named after Jack London) before ultimately changing their name to the Oaks, which was kind of considered a homage to the previous incarnation of the team name held in the second version of the American Basketball League, but was more considered a homage to the Pacific Coast League baseball team of the same name instead.) What is known, however, was that the Indiana Pacers won the ABA draft lottery and would select Jimmy Walker as the #1 pick in the process, with the second round being reversed in drafting order resulting in the Pacers having the last pick of the second round for Bob Netolicky. Likewise, the New Orleans Buccaneers would be the first team to complete a draft day trade in the ABA by making a deal with the Oakland Oaks with them sending their 1968 first round pick to Oakland for Marlbert Pradd, as well as select multiple multi-athlete players in Bob Seagren (an Olympiad pole vaulter) and Ron Widby (a football punter in the NFL) that year, with the Indiana Pacers also selecting a football player as well in Gene Washington. Any players that have a ‡ next to their names during this draft period mean that these players were selected for the ABA All-Time Team in 1997.

== Draft ==
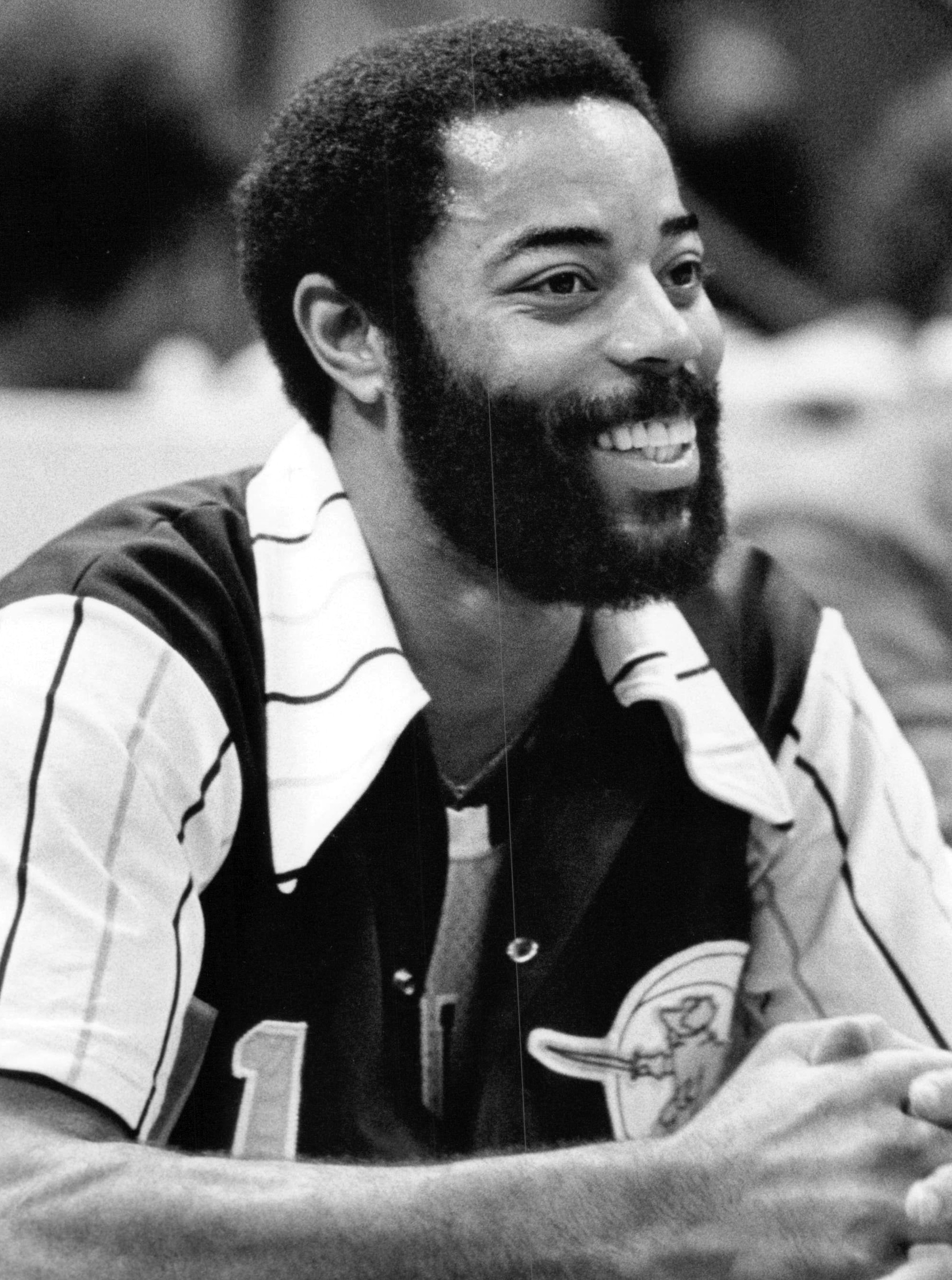
Walt Frazier was selected in the first round of the 1967 ABA Draft by the Denver Rockets.

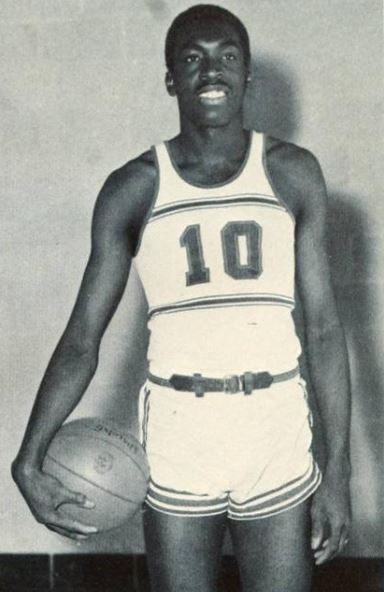
Earl Monroe was selected in the first round of the 1967 ABA Draft by the Pittsburgh Pipers.

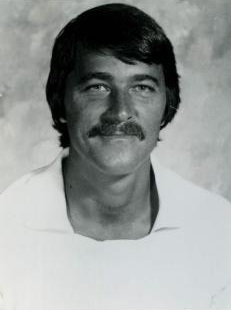
Louie Dampier was selected in the first round of the 1967 ABA Draft by the Kentucky Colonels. Dampier alongside Byron Beck would later be the only players in this draft to stay with the team that drafted them throughout all nine seasons of the ABA's existence.

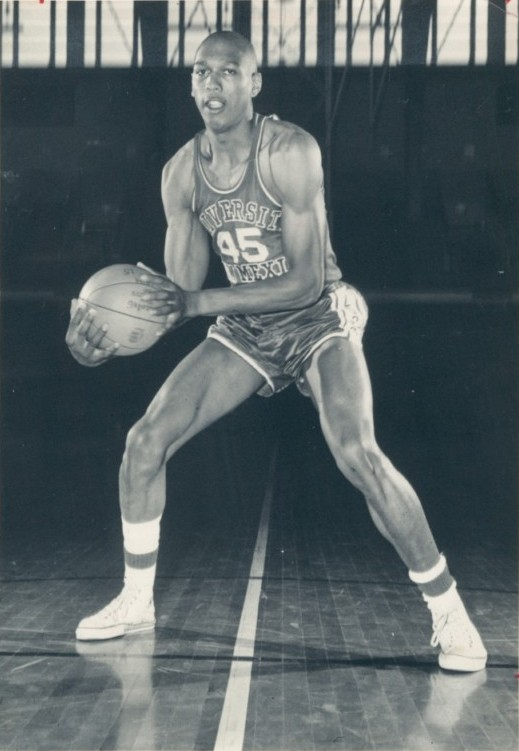
Mel Daniels was selected in the first round of the 1967 ABA Draft by the Minnesota Muskies.

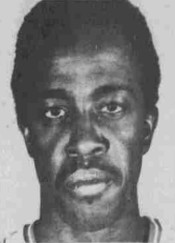
Jimmy Jones was selected in the first round of the 1967 ABA Draft by the New Orleans Buccaneers.

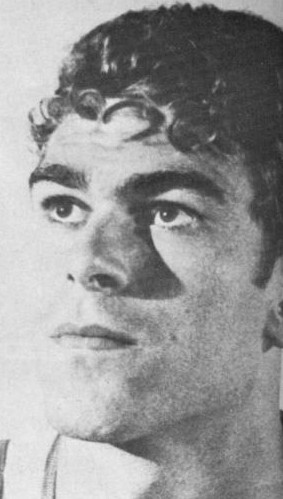
Phil Jackson was selected in the second round of the 1967 ABA Draft by the Minnesota Muskies.

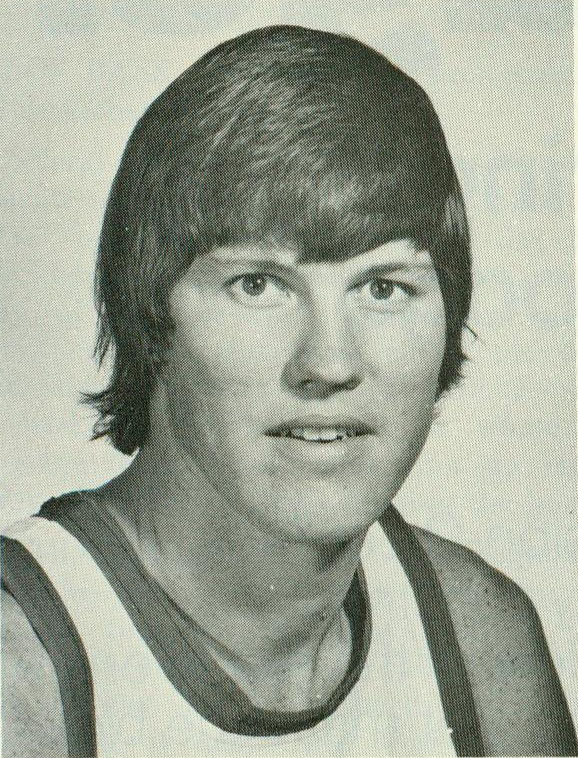
Bob Netolicky was essentially selected as the 22nd pick (the final pick of the second round) in the 1967 ABA Draft by the Indiana Pacers. Netolicky would later be one of three players from this draft (one of six overall players) to play in the ABA for all nine seasons of its existence.

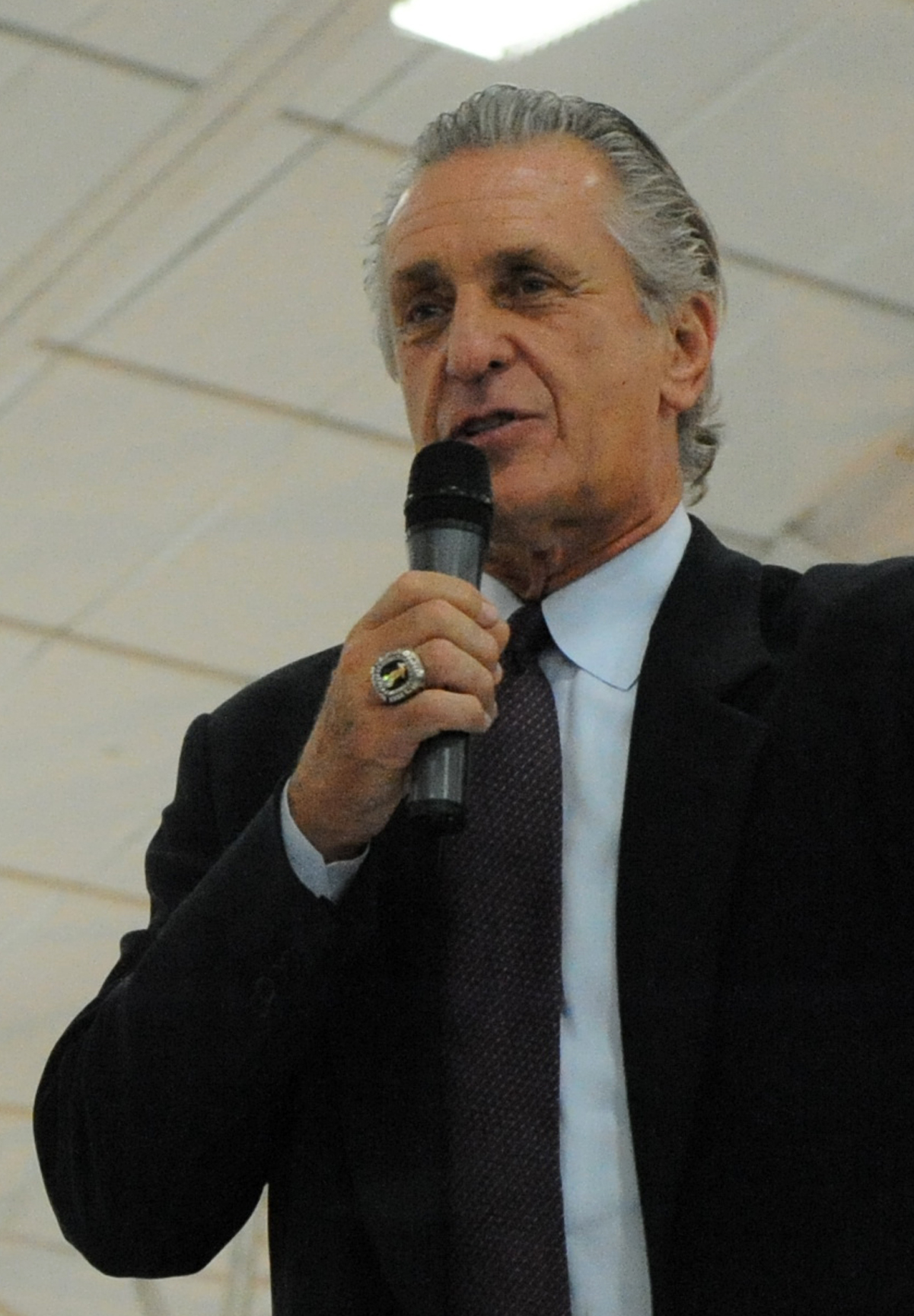
Pat Riley was selected in the fourth round of the 1967 ABA Draft by the Dallas Chaparrals. He was considered, historically speaking, the best prospect selected by Dallas in an otherwise botched first year draft process on their end.

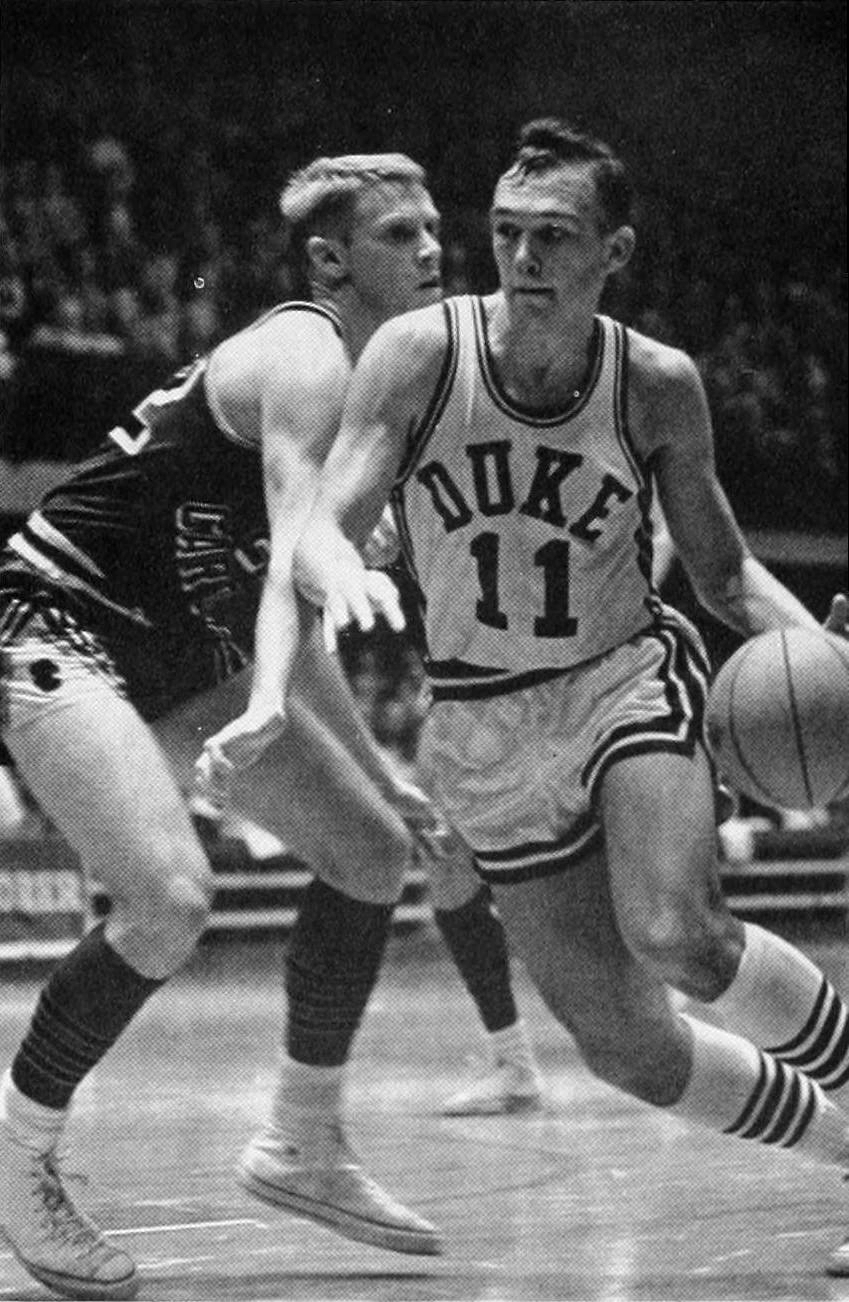
Bob Verga (right) was selected in the fourth round of the 1967 ABA Draft by the Kentucky Colonels.

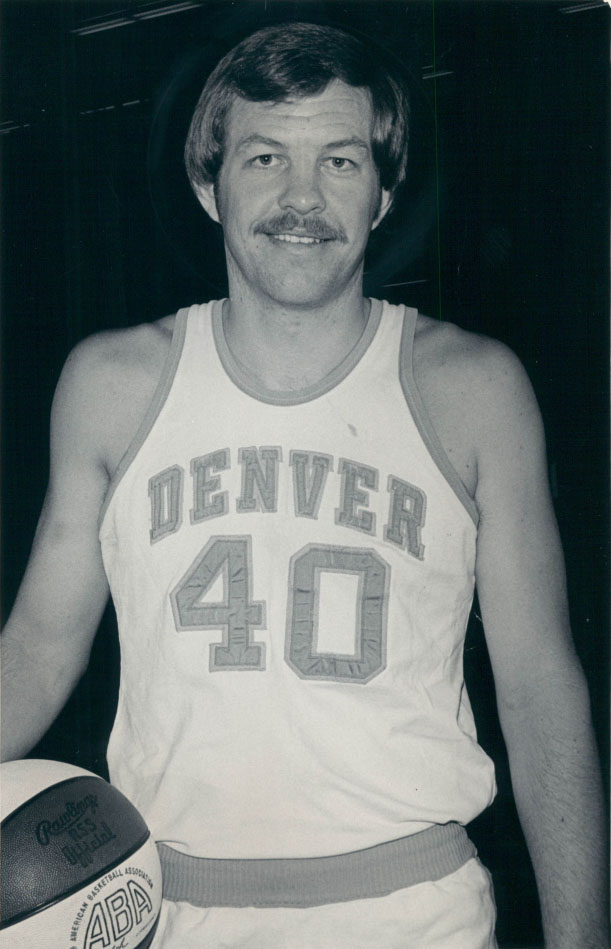
Byron Beck was selected in the fifth round of the 1967 ABA Draft by the Denver Rockets. Beck became the only player to stay with the team that first drafted him from the ABA and then play with that same team while playing in the NBA (albeit with the team renamed to the Nuggets in later years) following the NBA-ABA merger.

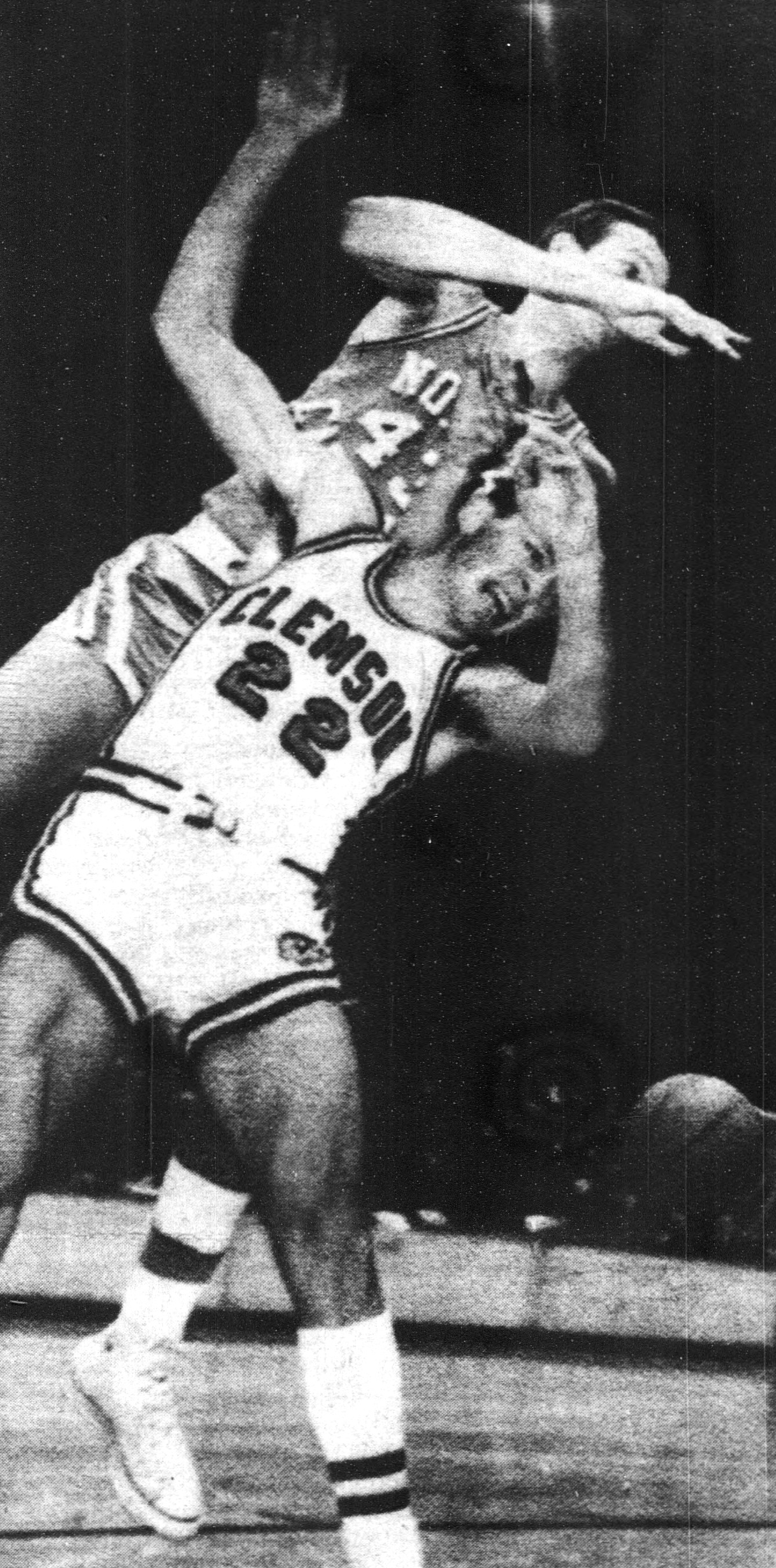
Randolph Mahaffey (upfront) was selected in one of the later rounds (presumably the tenth round) of the 1967 ABA Draft by the Kentucky Colonels.

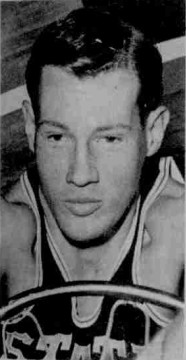
Larry Bunce was one of the first undrafted players of the ABA to gain success while in the league.

Anaheim Amigos
First five rounds (each round is not specified here):

- Darrell Hardy, University of Baylor (Sr.)
- Bob Krulish, University of the Pacific (Sr.)
- Bob Lewis, University of North Carolina (Sr.)
- Mike Lynn, UCLA (Jr.)
- Tom Workman, Seattle University (Sr.)

Extra Rounds:

- Jim Connelly, University of Virginia (Sr.)
- Denny Holman, Southern Methodist University (Sr.)
- Edgar Lacy, UCLA (Jr.)
- Les Powell, Utah State University (Sr.)
- Malkin Strong, Seattle University (Sr.)
- Gary Williams, Oklahoma State University (Sr.)
- Mike Wittman, University of Miami (Florida) (Sr.)

Dallas Chaparrals
First five rounds:

- #1. Matt Aitch, Michigan State University (Sr.)
- #2. Jim Burns, Northwestern University (Sr.)
- #3. Gary Gray, Oklahoma City University (Sr.)
- #4. Pat Riley, University of Kentucky (Sr.)
- #5. Jamie Thompson, Wichita State University (Sr.)

Extra Rounds:

- #6 Paul Brateris, Tennessee Wesleyan College (Sr.)
- #7 Jeff Fitch, East Texas State College (Sr.)
- #8 Ted Manning, North Carolina A&T State University (Sr.)
- #9 Duane Heckman, Dickinson College (Sr.)
- #10 Gilbert McDowell, Tennessee Wesleyan College (Sr.)
- #11 Jerry Southwood, Vanderbilt University (Sr.)
- #12 Tom Storm, Montana State University (Sr.)

It was later revealed by the Chaparrals' general manager at the time (and later, one-time future head coach) Max Williams that the draft ordering the team did that year was due to the team's original co-owner, Roland Speth (who later became the manager of The Monkees band), mistaking Williams' draft listing that he did in alphabetical order (with last names going from A-Z) as a list for the best possible talents being taken at hand as early as they could have done so. Speth would later leave the team's ownership group following this blunder.

Denver Larks/Lark Buntings/Rockets
First five rounds:

- #1. Walt Frazier, Southern Illinois University (Sr.)
- #2. Nevil Shed, Texas Western College (Sr.)
- #3. Bob Rule, Colorado State University (Sr.)
- #4. Gary Keller, University of Florida (Sr.)
- #5. Byron Beck, University of Denver (Sr.)

Extra Rounds (each round is not specified for Denver):

- Rick Dean, University of Syracuse (Sr.)
- Vaughn Harper, University of Syracuse (So.)
- Neil Heskin, Georgetown University (Sr.)
- Dave Lattin, Texas Western College (Sr.)
- John Morrison, Canisius College (Sr.)
- Neil Roberts, Brigham Young University (Sr.)
- Bill Turner, University of Akron (Sr.)

Houston Mavericks
First five rounds (each round is not specified here):

- Bob Benfield, West Virginia University (Sr.)
- Tony Eatmon, Pan American College (Sr.)
- Bob Riedy, Duke University (Sr.)
- Frank Stronczek, American International College (Sr.)
- Keith Swagerty, University of the Pacific (Sr.)

Extra Rounds (each round is not specified):

- Don Carlos, Otterbein University (Sr.)
- Hal Hale, Utah State University (Sr.)
- Guy Manning, Prairie View A&M College of Texas (Sr.)
- Jim Monahan, University of Notre Dame (Sr.)
- Mike Nau, Oregon State University (Sr.)
- Jerry Pettway, Northwood Institute (Sr.)
- Dale Schlueter, Colorado State University (Sr.)

Indiana Pacers
First five rounds (each round is not specified here unless stated otherwise):

- #1. Jimmy Walker, Providence College (Sr.)
- #2. Bob Netolicky, Drake University (Sr.)‡
- Charlie Beasley, Southern Methodist University (Sr.)
- Jimmy Dawson, University of Illinois (Sr.)
- Craig Dill, University of Michigan (Sr.)

Extra Rounds (each round is not specified):

- Frank Gaidjunes, Villanova University (Sr.)
- Jerry Jones, University of Iowa (Sr.)
- Ronald Kozlicki, Northwestern University (Sr.)
- Hubie Marshall, La Salle College (Sr.)
- Ed McKee, Rockhurst College (Sr.)
- Bill Russell, Indiana University (Sr.)
- Gene Washington, Michigan State University (Sr.)

Kentucky Colonels
First five rounds (each round is not specified here unless stated otherwise):

- #1. Louie Dampier, University of Kentucky (Sr.)‡
- Clem Haskins, Western Kentucky University (Sr.)
- Dwight Smith, Western Kentucky University (Sr.)
- Bob Verga, Duke University (Sr.)
- Willie Wolters, Boston College (Sr.)

Extra Rounds (each round is not specified):

- Earl Beechum, Midwestern University (Sr.)
- Mel Cox, Central Washington State College (Sr.)
- Ken Gibbs, Vanderbilt University (Sr.)
- Pres Judy, Georgia Institute of Technology (Sr.)
- Randolph Mahaffey, Clemson University (Sr.)
- Gwendell McSwain, Valdosta State College (Sr.)
- John Smith, Kent State University (Sr.)

Minnesota Muskies
First five rounds (each round is not specified here unless stated otherwise):

- #1. Mel Daniels, University of New Mexico (Sr.)‡
- Phil Jackson, University of North Dakota (Sr.)
- Bob Lloyd, Rutgers University (Sr.)
- Tim Powers, Creighton University (Sr.)
- Sam Smith, Kentucky Wesleyan College (Sr.)

Extra Rounds (each round is not specified):

- Al Clark, Eastern Kentucky University (Sr.)
- Gary Gregor, University of South Carolina (Jr.)
- Ervin Inniger, Indiana University (Sr.)
- Rich Jones, University of Illinois (So.)
- Lindberg Moody, South Carolina State College (Sr.)
- Errol Palmer, DePaul University (Sr.)
- Ron Perry, Virginia Polytechnic Institute (Sr.)

New Jersey Freighters / New York/New Jersey Americans
First five rounds (each round is not specified here):

- Sonny Dove, St. John's University (Sr.)
- Mal Graham, New York University (Sr.)
- Dick Pruett, Jacksonville University (Sr.)
- George Stone, Marshall University (Jr.)
- Bob Wolf, Marquette University (Sr.)

Extra Rounds (each round is not specified for this primarily New Jersey-based team):

- Tim Edwards, Amherst College (Sr.)
- Dan Hansard, College of St. Thomas (Sr.)
- Frank Hollendoner, Georgetown University (Sr.)
- Harry Laurie, St. Peter's College (So.)

New Orleans Buccaneers
First five rounds (each round is not specified here unless stated otherwise):

- #1. Jimmy Jones, Grambling College (Sr.)‡
- Robert Allen, Arkansas State College (Sr.)
- John Dickson, Arkansas State College (Sr.)
- Paul Long, Wake Forest University (Sr.)
- Ron Widby, University of Tennessee (Sr.)

Extra Rounds (each round is not specified):

- Al Andrews, Tulane University (Sr.)
- George Carter, St. Bonaventure University (Sr.)
- Carl Head, West Virginia University (Sr.)
- Allan Parris, University of Utah (Sr.)
- Jeff Ramsey, University of Florida (Sr.)
- Bob Seagren, University of Southern California (Sr.)
- Dexter Westbrook, Group Production Producers (Amateur Athletic Union)

Oakland Americans/Jacks/Oaks
First five rounds (each round is not specified here):

- Wes Bialosuknia, University of Connecticut (Sr.)
- Gordy Harris, University of Washington (Sr.)
- Richie Moore, Hiram Scott College (Sr.)
- Al Salvadori, University of South Carolina (Sr.)
- Al Tucker, Oklahoma Baptist University (Sr.)

Extra Rounds (each round is not specified for Oakland):

- Art Allen, Bethune–Cookman College (Sr.)
- Nate Branch, University of Nebraska (Sr.)
- Mike Davis, Virginia Union University (Sr.)
- Dave Fox, University of the Pacific (Sr.)
- Ron Franz, University of Kansas (Sr.)
- Bill Morgan, University of New Mexico (Sr.)
- Marlbert Pradd, Dillard University (Sr.)

Pittsburgh Pipers
First five rounds:

- #1. Earl Monroe, Winston-Salem Teachers College (Sr.)
- #2. Cliff Anderson, St. Joseph's College (Pennsylvania) (Sr.)
- #3. Craig Raymond, Brigham Young University (Sr.)
- #4. Trooper Washington, Cheyney State College (Sr.)
- #5. Barry Liebowitz, Long Island University (Brooklyn) (Sr.)

Extra Rounds (each round is not specified):

- Frank Card, Allentown Jets (Eastern Professional Basketball League)
- Ron Coleman, University of Missouri (Sr.)
- Chris Kefalos, Temple University (Sr.)
- Mike Riordan, Providence College (Sr.)
- John Schroeder, Ohio University (Sr.)
- Steve Sullivan, Georgetown University (Sr.)
- Jim Sutherland, Clemson University (Sr.)

=== Notable undrafted players ===
These players were officially considered draft eligible for the inaugural 1967 ABA draft and went undrafted this year, yet played at least one regular season or playoff game for the ABA during its entire life cycle before the eventual ABA-NBA merger occurred nearly a decade later on July 17, 1976. Since this was the inaugural season of the ABA, it would be natural that the ABA would feature a lot of undrafted players by comparison to the rest of the years played throughout its existence. However, starting with this draft year all the way up until the 1975 ABA draft year, players that would fit this moniker specifically would be players that were considered draft eligible for either the ABA draft or NBA draft year they both began at during the time of their respective drafts first beginning operations, meaning no players that were considered draft eligible from as recent as the 1966 NBA draft or as early as NBA drafts from the 1950s, nor any players that were previously considered ineligible for play by the NBA due to their ruling on players involved in the 1961 NCAA University Division men's basketball gambling scandal (at least at the time in the case of Connie Hawkins), nor even anybody that briefly played in the ABA for gimmicky purposes like (at the time) Anaheim Amigos public relations guy Dick Lee and female horse trainer/jockey Penny Ann Early of the Kentucky Colonels from the following season after this one would qualify for either this year's listing or other listings during later ABA draft years.

Player	Pos.	Nationality	School/Club team
Bill Allen	C	United States	New Mexico State (Sr.)
Andrew Anderson	PG/SG	United States	Canisius (Sr.)
Larry Bunce^{+}	C	United States	Utah State (Sr.)
Dick Clark	PG/SG	United States	Eastern Kentucky (Sr.)
Cal Graham	G	United States	Gannon College (Sr.)
Nick Jones	PG/SG	United States	Oregon (Sr.)
Arvesta Kelly	PG/SG	United States	Lincoln University (Missouri) (Sr.)
Leary Lentz	SF	United States	Houston (Sr.)
Ed Manning	PF	United States	Jackson State College (Sr.)
Roderick McDonald	SF/PF	United States	Whitworth College (Sr.)
DeWitt Menyard^{+}	C	United States	Utah (Sr.)
Larry Moore	SG/SF	United States	U.S. Armed Forces (Navy) (AAU)
Rich Peek	C	United States	Louisiana Polytechnic Institute (Sr.)
Ron Perry	PG/SG	United States	Virginia Polytechnic Institute (Sr.)
Rubin Russell	SG	United States	North Texas State (Sr.)
Randy Stoll	PF	United States	Washington State (Jr.)
Floyd Theard	PG	United States	Kentucky State College (Sr.)
Bobby Wilson	PF	United States	Kansas (Sr.)
Tommy Woods	PF	United States	East Tennessee State (Sr.)
