= 1973–74 San Diego Conquistadors season =

- Head coach: Wilt Chamberlain
- Arena: Golden Hall (3,200)

Results
- Record: 37–47 (.440)
- Place: Division: 4th (Western); Conference: 4th
- Playoff finish: Division Semifinals (lost to the Stars 2–4)

The 1973–74 San Diego Conquistadors season was the second season in franchise history. During the offseason, the Conquistadors not only moved away from the Peterson Gym to the Golden Hall in the hopes of finding better luck with gaining fans there despite it having less seating by comparison, but they also acquired legendary Los Angeles Lakers center Wilt Chamberlain with the intention of using him as a player-coach for their franchise, though a judge later ruled that he could only coach for the team and not play for them. As a result of that ruling, he subsequently left a chunk of the coaching duties to assistant coach Stan Albeck since Chamberlain proved to not have much interest in coaching basketball as he did playing it. The team finished the season with a tied record for fourth place in the ABA's Western Division alongside the Denver Rockets. In the one-game playoff, despite San Diego playing this game on the road, the Conquistadors defeated the Rockets in what ultimately became the Rockets' final game under that name; the Denver franchise would soon rebrand themselves to the Denver Nuggets the following season and still use that name while in the NBA to this day. The Conquistadors then lost to the Utah Stars in six games during the Western Division Semifinals in what ultimately became their second and final playoff run in franchise history.

== Offseason ==
=== ABA Draft ===
Interestingly, this year's ABA draft would involve four different types of drafts throughout the early 1973 year: a "Special Circumstances Draft" on January 15, a "Senior Draft" on April 25, an "Undergraduate Draft" also on April 25, and a "Supplemental Draft" on May 18. As such, the following selections were made in these respective drafts by the Conquistadors, which were considered the first official drafts the San Diego franchise had done in the ABA outside of the expansion draft they did with the rest of the surviving ABA teams from the previous year.

==== ABA Special Circumstances Draft ====
Round	Pick	Player	Position	Nationality	College
1	7	David Vaughn Jr.	C	United States	Oral Roberts
2	18	Bird Averitt	SF	United States	Pepperdine

Due to the "Special Circumstances Draft" being held in January, this draft was considered the only draft done this year where the Conquistadors didn't have the #1 pick in the first round of the draft, with the Denver Rockets getting the #1 pick of the first round for that specific draft there instead. Every other draft this year is one that's considered a draft where the Conquistadors would acquire the #1 pick of the respective draft involved for the rest of the year.

==== ABA Senior Draft ====
Round	Pick	Player	Position(s)	Nationality	College
1	1	Bo Lamar	PG	United States	Southwestern Louisiana
2	13	Tim Bassett	PF/C	United States	Georgia
3	23	Tom Ingelsby	PG	United States	Villanova
4	33	Darryl Minniefield	C	United States	New Mexico
5	43	Reggie Royals	C	United States	Florida State
6	53	Jim Owens	SF	United States	Arizona State
7	63	Ken Charles	SG	(Trinidad and Tobago) Trinidad & Tobago	Fordham
8	73	Chris McMurray	F	United States	San Diego State
9	83	Russ Hunt	C	United States	Furman
10	93	Nick Connor	F	United States	Illinois

The "Senior Draft" done in April is often considered the official, main draft period of the 1973 ABA draft by basketball historians.

==== ABA Undergraduate Draft ====
Round	Pick	Player	Position(s)	Nationality	College
11 (1)	101 (1)	Bill Walton	C	United States	UCLA
12 (2)	113 (13)	Jim Bradley	SF/PF	United States	Northern Illinois

The "Undergraduate Draft" is considered a continuation of the "Senior Draft" that was done earlier that same day, hence the numbering of the rounds and draft picks here.

==== ABA Supplemental Draft ====
Round	Pick	Player	Position(s)	Nationality	College
1	1	Larry Moore	C	United States	UT Arlington
2	11	Mike Contreras	G	United States	Arizona State
3	19	Doug Little	G	United States	Oregon
4	27	Ernie Kusnyer	F	United States	Kansas State
6	40	Jerry Bisbano	F	United States	Southwestern Louisiana
7	47	Mark Beckwith	C	United States	Montana State
8	53	Wayne Pack	PG	United States	Tennessee Tech
9	59	Fred DeVaughn	F	United States	Westmont College

None of the eight players selected in the "Supplemental Draft" would ever play for the Conquistadors once this draft concluded in May, though Wayne Pack would later play in the ABA for the Indiana Pacers instead.

==== The Wilt Chamberlain Saga and Other Notable Things ====
On September 26, 1973, the Conquistadors signed legendary Hall of Fame-caliber center Wilt Chamberlain to a three-year, $1.8 million contract to become the team's player-coach. However, the Los Angeles Lakers, who had a contract with Chamberlain that was still going on with him at the time, promptly went to court against the ABA and the Conquistadors and subsequently won a ruling that Chamberlain could only play professional basketball for the Lakers while his contract with them was ongoing, though the courts did allow Chamberlain to be the head coach for the Conquistadors instead. Not long after that, Stan Albeck was hired as the Conquistadors' assistant coach and as the team's Director of Player Personnel. However, as the season further played out for the franchise, Albeck often acted as the team's head coach during Chamberlain's erratic absences, which included him missing a game to promote his own biography at the time.

Also during the preseason, the Conquistadors signed Travis "Machine Gun" Grant from the Lakers onto the roster, despite his ABA draft rights being held by the Utah Stars at the time of the 1972 ABA draft.

During the preseason period, the Conquistadors were an anomaly amongst the entire ABA in that, unlike other ABA teams, they did not play any exhibition games against NBA teams whatsoever that season (though they would play preseason games against other NBA teams in later seasons).

== Roster ==
1973–74 San Diego Conquistadors roster
Players

Pos.	No.	Player	Height	Weight	DOB	From
SF	12	George Adams	6 ft 5 in (1.96 m)	210 lb (95 kg)	May 15, 1949	Gardner–Webb
PF	25	Tim Bassett	6 ft 8 in (2.03 m)	225 lb (102 kg)	April 1, 1951	Georgia
SF	33, 42	Travis Grant	6 ft 7 in (2.01 m)	215 lb (98 kg)	January 1, 1950	Kentucky State
PF	2	Stew Johnson	6 ft 8 in (2.03 m)	220 lb (100 kg)	August 19, 1944	Murray State
C	3	Caldwell Jones	6 ft 11 in (2.11 m)	217 lb (98 kg)	August 4, 1950	Albany State
PG	10	Bo Lamar	6 ft 1 in (1.85 m)	180 lb (82 kg)	April 7, 1951	Louisiana
SG	44	Larry Miller	6 ft 4 in (1.93 m)	190 lb (86 kg)	April 4, 1946	North Carolina
C	55	Gene Moore	6 ft 9 in (2.06 m)	225 lb (102 kg)	July 29, 1945	Saint Louis
PG	3	Jim O'Brien	6 ft 1 in (1.85 m)	170 lb (77 kg)	April 9, 1950	Boston College
SG	14	Jerry Pender	6 ft 2 in (1.88 m)	185 lb (84 kg)	February 12, 1950	Fresno State
C	21	Red Robbins	6 ft 8 in (2.03 m)	190 lb (86 kg)	September 30, 1944	Tennessee
SG	40	Flynn Robinson	6 ft 1 in (1.85 m)	185 lb (84 kg)	April 28, 1941	Wyoming
PG	20	Billy Shepherd	5 ft 10 in (1.78 m)	160 lb (73 kg)	November 18, 1949	Butler
SF	22	Paul Stovall	6 ft 4 in (1.93 m)	215 lb (98 kg)	August 16, 1948	Arizona State
PG	23	Chuck Williams	6 ft 2 in (1.88 m)	175 lb (79 kg)	June 6, 1946	Colorado

Coaches
Head coach

Wilt Chamberlain

Legend
- (DP) Unsigned draft pick
- (FA) Free agent
- (S) Suspended
- Injured

Roster

== Regular season ==
=== Season standings ===
Western Division
Team	W	L	PCT.	GB
Utah Stars	51	33	.607	-
Indiana Pacers	46	38	.548	5
San Antonio Spurs	45	39	.536	6
San Diego Conquistadors	37	47	.440	14
Denver Rockets	37	47	.440	14

=== Game log ===
1973–74 game log
November

Game	Date	Team	Score	High points	Location Attendance	Record

December

Game	Date	Team	Score	High points	Location Attendance	Record

January

Game	Date	Team	Score	High points	Location Attendance	Record

February

Game	Date	Team	Score	High points	Location Attendance	Record

March

Game	Date	Team	Score	High points	Location Attendance	Record

April

Game	Date	Team	Score	High points	Location Attendance	Record

1973–74 season schedule

=== Month by Month ===
==== October 1973 ====
The Conquistadors opened the ABA season on October 10, 1973, with a road game against the San Antonio Spurs. 5,879 attended as the Conquistadors prevailed, 121–106, behind Stew Johnson's game-high 38 points. The following night 5,013 fans saw the Conquistadors lose on the road to the Denver Rockets, 135–111. The following night the Conquistadors played their home opener in front of 2,318 fans but lost to the Memphis Tams 118–113 in spite of Stew Johnson's 34 points.

After a week off, the Conquistadors again faced the Rockets, this time on their home court in San Diego. The Conquistadors lost again to the Rockets, 113–100. Stew Johnson scored 23 points in front of 2,468 fans. Two nights later, on October 21, the Conquistadors took to their home court in front of 2,261 fans and lost a double-overtime game to the Indiana Pacers, 112–105. After another day off the Conquistadors hosted the Spurs and lost 112–110 in front of 2,468 fans.

On October 26 the Conquistadors, now 1–5, took the court in San Diego against the Utah Stars and their 4–5 record. With a crowd of 2,358 watching, Bo Lamar scored 36 points to lead the Conquistadors to a 122–102 victory.

On October 28 the Conquistadors took their home floor against Memphis and the teams set an ABA record for the most 2 point field goals in a single game by two teams (117). The Conquistadors won, 146–133, in front of 1,906 fans.

On October 29 the Conquistadors signed Caldwell Jones as they traded Larry Miller to the Virginia Squires for Jones.

==== November 1973 ====
The Conquistadors took a 3–5 record into November. On November 1 the Q's and Tams met again, this time in Memphis, and the Conquistadors repeated as victors, 103–100, in front of 6,273 fans. The following night in Salt Lake City had the Conquistadors take their improved 4–5 record into the Salt Palace in front of 7,168 fans, but lost to the Stars 126–110.

November 6 saw the Q's on the road at Denver, losing 110–104 to the Rockets before a crowd of 2,058. The following night in San Antonio the Conquistadors managed only 9 points in the entire first quarter against the Spurs. A furious comeback led by Bo Lamar's 34 points made for a tight game but the Q's could not overcome their terrible first quarter and lost 105–104 in front of 7,101 fans. That same day, November 7, brought bad news for the franchise: a ballot initiative to fund team owner Leonard Bloom's proposed 20,000-seat arena was defeated by the electorate. 19,000 ballots were cast in the referendum, and the proposal lost by only 294 votes. As a result, attendance problems, which already were bad because the Q's were forced to play in tiny Golden Hall (3,200 seats) instead of in the San Diego Sports Arena, became worse as rumors swirled that the Conquistadors would move to Los Angeles at the end of the season. The league did, in fact, on November 10 order Bloom to begin investigating such a move.

The Q's next took the court on November 10, facing the New York Nets in San Diego. Julius Erving scored 35 points for the Nets but the Q's prevailed 107–105 in front of 2,369 fans. The following night the Q's took their home court again, with only 1,422 in attendance, and eked out a narrow 102–101 victory against the Indiana Pacers to bring their season record to 6–8.

November 14 brought the Q's to Salt Lake City once again, where the Stars prevailed 129–119 in front of 6,354 fans despite Stew Johnson's game-high 23 points. On November 16 the Conquistadors lost in overtime at home against the Denver Rockets, 130–126; only 1,666 fans were reported for the game. The following night the Q's lost to the Spurs in San Antonio, 118–96; Stew Johnson scored 32 in front of 4,046 fans.

On November 21 the Q's took their home floor in front of 1,685 fans and defeated the Carolina Cougars 139–125 behind Bo Lamar's game-high 36 points. A brief winning streak commenced for the Q's as they met the Cougars again on November 23 in Raleigh and came away with a 111–107 overtime victory behind Stew Johnson's 30 points. The following night saw a close game in front of 3,421 fans in Cincinnati, Ohio as the Conquistadors played a tough game but lost 124–121 to the Kentucky Colonels and that team's fearsome front line as Dan Issel and Artis Gilmore scored 30 points each for Kentucky. November 27 saw another Q's loss, this time in Indianapolis to the Pacers, 129–117, before 8,018 fans. The Q's next game came on November 28 as they lost 134–108 to the Nets in front of 6,884 fans in Uniondale, New York.

On the 30th the Conquistadors took an 8–14 record into their final game of November, a home matchup against the Virginia Squires. The Conquistadors scored 86 points in the first half. Virginia's George Gervin put in 37 points but the Q's held on for a 145–139 victory to close out the month at 9–14.

==== December 1973 ====
On the 2nd they opened the month at home against the Utah Stars and won 105–100 before 1,230 fans. Another win came two nights later in Memphis as the Q's bested the Tams 112–101 before 2,285 fans. The following night the Conquistadors took their improved 11–14 record to Denver but lost a lopsided game to the Rockets, 138–108, in front of 3,773 fans. On the 7th came another loss, 121–113, in front of 7,158 fans on the Utah Stars' homecourt. The following night saw a home loss to the Spurs, 95–85, with attendance at 1,624.

On December 11 Wilt Chamberlain's bench role became final as an arbitrator ruled that, due to the option year on his contract with the Los Angeles Lakers (which was later thrown out in the Oscar Robertson suit by the United States Supreme Court in 1976), Chamberlain was bound to the Lakers for the season and could not play for San Diego properly, though he could at least remain on the team as their head coach.

December 12 saw the Q's prevail 119–113 on the Indiana Pacers' home court; Bo Lamar had 30 points, as did Indiana's George McGinnis. 6,831 turned up for the Pacers game; only 1,200 were announced the following night in Memphis as the Q's defeated the Tams 107–104. One night later a 112–104 road victory over the Nets followed, this time in front of 8,223 fans. The Conquistadors' three-game winning streak came to an end on their home court the following night in front of 1,764 fans as the Kentucky Colonels came away with a 106–101 win despite Stew Johnson's 40 points.

On December 19 the Conquistadors took their 14–18 record to Denver and defeated the Rockets 118–113 before 3,031 fans. December 21 saw the Conquistadors pull out a 140–130 win against the Carolina Cougars in front of 1,368 home fans. The following night in San Antonio the Q's earned an overtime victory in front of 8,769 Spurs fans; the final score was 129–123 and the Conquistadors were now one game away from .500 with 17 wins and 18 losses. Once again, however, the Conquistadors had a three-game winning streak ended by the Kentucky Colonels, 123–120 in San Diego. 2,368 fans were announced as Dan Issel led all scorers with 31 points. A 102–98 road loss to the Utah Stars followed, as 6,157 fans watched. One night later the Q's lost at home 104–76 to the San Antonio Spurs.

December 29 saw the Conquistadors rebound with a 124–119 home victory against the New York Nets. The Nets had a 22-point lead at halftime but the Conquistadors mounted a furious comeback to down that season's eventual ABA champions. Attendance improved to 2,511 for that game but dipped to 1,816 the following night as the Indiana Pacers managed a one-point win against the Q's, 109–108. San Diego ended December and the 1973 year with an 18–22 record.

==== January 1974 ====
January 1974 saw the Conquistadors trade Red Robbins and Chuck Williams to the Kentucky Colonels for Jim O'Brien and a future draft choice.

On January 4 the Q's opened the new year in front of 2,101 fans but lost to the San Antonio Spurs 112–105. The next evening saw a loss on the road at Denver; the Rockets prevailed 146–122 as Warren Jabali dished 19 assists in front of 6,183 spectators. The next evening saw the Conquistadors lose a home game in front of 1,329 fans to the Carolina Cougars, 120–109; Mack Calvin scored 29 points and Caldwell Jones tied an ABA record with 12 blocked shots. On January 9 the Q's dropped a 115–112 contest on the Utah Stars' home court; 5,784 were in attendance and Willie Wise scored 35 points. The next evening saw the Conquistadors notch their first win of 1974, prevailing 109–107 against the Indiana Pacers in front of 5,016 fans in Indianapolis. Next was a home loss on January 12 to the Stars; 1,851 watched Utah prevail as Willie Wise put in 29 points. On January 13 Bo Lamar scored a game-high 50 points as San Diego won on its home court 141–130 against the Indiana Pacers; attendance was 1,386 for the game. January 16 saw a road loss to the Virginia Squires despite Bo Lamar's 28 points.

On January 17 the Q's dropped a matchup against the Spurs in San Antonio 101–97; 4,138 attended and Bird Averitt scored 35. The following evening 1,683 saw San Diego lose a home game to Denver, 120–113. January 20 brought the Q's to Indianapolis for a one-point loss to the Pacers, 123–122, as Bo Lamar and George McGinnis each scored 40 points in front of 9,164 fans. January 23 saw the Conquistadors, 2–9 in January so far, pull off an upset, defeating the Kentucky Colonels 106–99 in Louisville in front of 9,307 as Bo Lamar led all scorers with 25 points. The next evening San Diego won its second road game in a row 125–108 against the Virginia Squires despite George Gervin's 27 points. The Q's brief winning streak came to an end on January 25 with a 116–104 road loss to the Carolina Cougars as Travis Grant scored 23. January 27 saw the Conquistadors lose a close one on their home court to the Kentucky Colonels 105–103; attendance had improved to 3,011 but Dan Issel's 34 points were too much to overcome. The next evening the Q's lost in Salt Lake City 120–109 to the Utah Stars; 9,464 watched as Travis Grant scored 28 points. The Conquistadors ended January with a 4–12 record for the month; their overall record stood at 22 wins and 34 losses (.393). A high point came on January 30 as Stew Johnson represented the Conquistadors while playing in the ABA All-Star Game.

==== February 1974 ====
The Conquistadors opened the new month with a home win on its first day, defeating the Indiana Pacers 124–119 despite George McGinnis' 38 points; San Diego's attendance problems continued as only 1,237 fans came to the game. February 3 brought another home victory for the Q's as they defeated the Virginia Squires 107–104, with 1,058 in attendance. On February 6 the Conquistadors, in front of 1,236 fans, took their home win streak to three games by defeating the Memphis Tams 136–120. The streak went to four on February 8 as the traveling San Antonio Spurs lost 120–105 as Bo Lamar put in 48 points in front of a crowd of 1,326. On February 10 the Q's, now 25–34, had their home win streak come to an end as the Utah Stars prevailed 120–107 despite Bo Lamar's 30 points. On February 13 the Conquistadors lost at home to the Indiana Pacers, 128–119; 1,066 attended. February 17 saw another San Diego home win and improved attendance as the Conquistadors took down the Carolina Cougars 129–123 in front of 1,866 as Travis Grant put in 41 points. Another home win came on February 20 as the Q's defeated the Utah Stars 109–97 in front of 1,184 fans. February 22 brought a road loss to the New York Nets, 121–113; the Conquistadors' next game, on February 26, was a 126–119 win on the Virginia Squires' home court as Travis Grant led all scorers with 32. The next evening brought another road win, 119–117 against the Carolina Cougars. February was San Diego's best month of the season with an 8–3 record, bringing the team to an overall record of 30–37.

==== March 1974 ====
San Diego's solid February gave way to a bad stretch to start out March. The Conquistadors faced the New York Nets on the road on the first day of the month and lost 138–119 despite Stew Johnson's 35 points. March 3 saw the Conquistadors routed at Denver, 139–112; five Rockets scored 20 or more points. Next, March 6 came a 123–97 road loss to the New York Nets, and March 8 saw the Q's lose on the San Antonio Spurs' court 115–113 despite Bo Lamar's 39 points. The next evening saw the Conquistadors' first victory of the month, a 100–96 home win against Denver as Stew Johnson scored 29 in front of 1,020 fans. San Diego repeated that feat the following night in Denver, winning 114–99 behind Bo Lamar's 33. March 13 brought a home victory against the Virginia Squires, 119–103; Caldwell Jones scored 34 in front of 1,319. The Q's three game win streak ended on the road on March 15 as the Indiana Pacers won 145–129, with Tim Bassett setting an ABA and franchise record with 18 offensive rebounds. The next evening brought a road win against the Carolina Cougars, 101–90; Bo Lamar had 26 points. The next night saw San Diego lose a close game at home to the Memphis Tams, 118–115; 1,583 attended as Bo Lamar scored 34. March 20 brought a win for the Q's, 125–122 at home against the Virginia Squires, as 2,598 – a great crowd for San Diego though not for the league – saw Stew Johnson pour in 45 points. March 22 saw a 111–106 road loss to the New York Nets despite Caldwell Jones' 27; a 109–101 road loss to the Virginia Squires came on the next night. On March 24, Caldwell Jones led all scorers with 30 points on the Kentucky Colonels' home court but Kentucky won 122–111 in front of 9,115 fans. March 26 brought a 110–105 road win against the Memphis Tams behind Bo Lamar's 33 points; the following night the Conquistadors defeated the Kentucky Colonels in San Diego 121–108 as 3,006 fans saw Stew Johnson score 40 points.

With that upset and the two-game win streak the Conquistadors edged themselves into a tie with the Denver Rockets for fourth place in the Western Division as they finished the regular season with a record of 37–47 after going 7–9 in March. San Diego's average home attendance for the season stood at 1,843, a drop off of 404 fans from their average of 2,247 during the prior season, which was also their first season. Bo Lamar was named to the ABA All-Rookie Team as the Conquistadors headed for a one-game playoff with Denver for the right to enter the 1974 ABA Playoffs at fourth place in the Western Division.

== ABA Playoffs ==
The Conquistadors and the Denver Rockets both finished the regular season with 37 wins and 47 losses and thus tied for fourth place in the Western Division. As a result, the two met for a one-game playoff to determine which of the two teams would claim the fourth and final playoff spot in the Western Division. The Rockets had won 8 of their 11 regular season games against San Diego. The two teams met in Denver on March 29, 1974. Despite all the disadvantages going against San Diego that night, the Conquistadors convincingly won that game 131–111, thus laying sole claim to the Western Division fourth place spot and a berth in the 1974 ABA Playoffs against the Western Division champion Utah Stars, having a rematch against the team that swept them in the first round last season. The Stars had finished the regular season with a 51–33 record, 14 games ahead of the Conquistadors.

The Western Division Semifinals began the very next day, on March 30, at the Salt Palace in Salt Lake City, Utah. The Stars won 114–99, and again on April 1, 119–105.

On April 3 the teams met in San Diego and the Conquistadors won a close game 97–96 to cut the Stars' series lead to 2–1. It would become their first playoff game the Conquistadors ever won. The following night, April 4, the Conquistadors evened up the series at 2–2 with a 100–98 victory on their home court. Unfortunately for them, it would later become the final playoff game the Conquistadors would win in their short existence in the ABA.

The teams then returned to Salt Lake City where, on April 6, the Stars won 100–93 to take a 3–2 series lead. On April 8, the Stars and Conquistadors met in San Diego for Game 6 in the series. The Stars prevailed 110–99 to eliminate the Conquistadors and advance to the Western Division Finals against the Indiana Pacers. The Stars then went on to defeat the Pacers 4 games to 3 before losing the ABA Championship to the Eastern Division champion New York Nets, 4 games to 1.

1974 playoff game log
Fourth Place ABA Tiebreaker Match

Game	Date	Team	Score	High points	High rebounds	High assists	Location	Series
1	March 29	@ Denver	W 131–111	Bo Lamar (40)	Tim Bassett (12)	Jimmy O'Brien (12)	Denver Auditorium Arena; 3,305	1–0

ABA Western Division Semifinals: 2–4 (home: 2–1; road: 0–3)

Game	Date	Team	Score	High points	High rebounds	High assists	Location Attendance	Series
1	March 30	@ Utah	L 99–114	Bo Lamar (23)	Tim Bassett (17)	Tim Bassett (7)	Salt Palace; 5,558	0–1
2	April 1	@ Utah	L 105–119	Bo Lamar (41)	Tim Bassett (190	Lamar, O'Brien, Shepherd (5)	Salt Palace; 6,242	0–2
3	April 3	Utah	W 96–97	Bo Lamar (22)	Caldwell Jones (18)	Jones, Bassett, Johnson, O'Brien (5)	Golden Hall; 2,295	1–2
4	April 4	Utah	W 100–98	Bo Lamar (32)	Jones, Bassett 13 each	Jim O'Brien 5	Golden Hall; 2,089	2–2
5	April 6	@ Utah	L 93–110	Tim Bassett (26)	Tim Bassett (19)	O'Brien, Shepherd (4)	Salt Palace; 6,648	2–3
6	April 8	Utah	L 99–110	Bo Lamar (33)	Caldwell Jones (22)	Bo Lamar (7)	Golden Hall; 3,140	2–4

1974 schedule

== Awards and records ==
=== Awards ===
- Stew Johnson: ABA All-Star
- Bo Lamar: ABA All-Rookie Team

=== Records ===
- October 28, 1973: combined with Memphis Tams for ABA record most 2-point field goals for two teams combined (117)
- November 7, 1973: fewest points (9) in a first quarter, season (vs. San Antonio Spurs)
- November 30, 1973: most points (86) in the first half, season (vs. Virginia Squires)
- January 5, 1974: Warren Jabali, 19 assists (vs. Denver Rockets)
- January 6, 1974: Caldwell Jones, most blocked shots in one game (tied record with 12), vs. Carolina Cougars
- March 15, 1974: Tim Bassett, ABA record 18 offensive rebounds (vs. Indiana Pacers)

== Transactions ==
=== Draft and preseason signings ===
The Conquistadors drafted Bird Averitt, who signed with the San Antonio Spurs, and Bo Lamar and Tim Bassett, both of whom signed with and played for the Conquistadors. In the undergraduate draft, the Conquistadors drafted UCLA's star center Bill Walton, who opted to stay in school. On September 26, 1973, legendary Hall of Fame center Wilt Chamberlain was signed to a 3-year, $1.8 million contract to initially as the team's player-coach, but litigation with the Los Angeles Lakers kept Chamberlain off the court, only working as the team's head coach that season. Travis "Machine Gun" Grant of the Lakers was also signed in the preseason.

=== Trades ===
- October 29, 1973: Larry Miller traded to the Virginia Squires for Caldwell Jones
- January 1974: Red Robbins and Chuck Williams traded to the Kentucky Colonels for Jim O'Brien and a future draft pick
