= 1970–71 Memphis Pros season =

- Head coach: Babe McCarthy
- General manager: Charles Cavagnaro
- Owners: P.L. Blake (early on); Memphis Area Sports, Inc.
- Arena: Mid-South Coliseum

Results
- Record: 41–43 (.488)
- Place: Division: 3rd (ABA)
- Playoff finish: Division Semifinals (lost to Pacers 0–4)

The 1970–71 Memphis Pros season was the first season of the Pros in the American Basketball Association after three seasons in New Orleans as the Buccaneers, with P.L. Blake of Mississippi buying the team on August 21, 1970, and moving the team 10 days later to Memphis. Due to having to reuse the Bucs' jerseys with a name that would fit the four letters they had put on the home and road jerseys, the team was named "Pros". However the Pros had to deal with limited dates to book for games at the Mid-South Coliseum, with some of the games being played in Jackson, Mississippi. On October 20, 1970, the Pros played their first ever game, playing the New York Nets in Memphis, losing 108–103. The biggest losing streak was 8, coming near the end of the season, with them losing 20 out of their last 30 games. However, they sneaked into the playoffs, finishing third over the Texas Chaparrals and Denver Rockets by 11 games. The Pros finished dead last in points scored per game with 109.2, but finished first in points allowed at 109.9 per game. In the playoffs, they were swept by the Indiana Pacers.

Meanwhile, Blake had decided to let the league take over operations of the team less than midway through the season, claiming losses of $200,000. With the threat of the team being bought and relocated somewhere else, the city of Memphis attempted to save the team with a public offering named "Save the Pros" on February 12, 1971, in which people could buy stock certificates of either $5, $10, or $50. In total, over 4,000 people bought stock in the team. The plan worked, and the Pros would subsequently be owned by Memphis Area Sports Inc., a local group with a 24-member board of directors, instead.

== Roster ==
1970–71 Memphis Pros roster
Players

Pos.	No.	Player	Height	Weight	DOB	From
C	22	Al Cueto	6 ft 7 in (2.01 m)	230 lb (104 kg)	August 2, 1946	Tulsa
PF	34	Lee Davis	6 ft 8 in (2.03 m)	235 lb (107 kg)	October 11, 1945	North Carolina Central
C	12	Coby Dietrick	6 ft 10 in (2.08 m)	220 lb (100 kg)	July 23, 1948	San José State
C	25	Gerald Govan	6 ft 10 in (2.08 m)	220 lb (100 kg)	January 2, 1942	Saint Mary of the Plains College
PG	15	Jimmy Jones	6 ft 4 in (1.93 m)	188 lb (85 kg)	January 1, 1945	Grambling State
SG	23	Steve Jones	6 ft 5 in (1.96 m)	205 lb (93 kg)	October 17, 1942	Oregon
PF	11	Wil Jones	6 ft 8 in (2.03 m)	205 lb (93 kg)	February 27, 1947	Albany State
SF	33	Wendell Ladner	6 ft 5 in (1.96 m)	220 lb (100 kg)	1948-10-06	Southern Miss
C	32	Craig Raymond	6 ft 11 in (2.11 m)	235 lb (107 kg)	April 5, 1945	BYU
SG	24	Skeeter Swift	6 ft 3 in (1.91 m)	204 lb (93 kg)	June 19, 1946	East Tennessee State
SG	21	Bob Warren	6 ft 5 in (1.96 m)	190 lb (86 kg)	July 17, 1946	Vanderbilt
PG	10	Charlie Williams	6 ft 0 in (1.83 m)	165 lb (75 kg)	September 5, 1943	Seattle

Coaches
Head coach
- Babe McCarthy

Legend
- (DP) Unsigned draft pick
- (FA) Free agent
- (S) Suspended
- Injured

Roster

== Final standings ==
=== Western Division ===
Western Division	W	L	PCT	GB
Indiana Pacers *	58	26	.690	—
Utah Stars *	57	27	.679	1.0
Memphis Pros *	41	43	.488	17.0
Texas Chaparrals *	30	54	.357	28.0
Denver Rockets	30	54	.357	28.0

== ABA Playoffs ==
1971 playoff game log
ABA Eastern Division Semifinals: 0–4 (home: 0–2; road: 0–2)

Game	Date	Team	Score	High points	High rebounds	High assists	Location	Series
1	April 2	@ Indiana	L 98–114	J. Jones, Williams (24)	W. Jones (14)	W. Jones (6)	Indiana Farmers Coliseum; 7,562	0–1
2	April 3	@ Indiana	L 104–106	Steve "Snapper" Jones (31)	Gerald Govan (20)	Govan, Ladner (6)	Indiana Farmers Coliseum; 8,701	0–2
3	April 5	Indiana	L 90–91	Steve "Snapper" Jones (31)	Gerald Govan (15)	Govan, W. Jones, J. Jones (5)	Mid-South Coliseum; 4,107	0–3
4	April 7	Indiana	L 101–102 (OT)	Jimmy Jones (22)	Jimmy Jones (14)	Gerald Govan (8)	Mid-South Coliseum; 3,681	0–4

1971 schedule

== Awards and honors ==
1971 ABA All-Star Game selection (game played on January 23, 1971)

- Jimmy Jones
- Steve Jones
- Wendell Ladner
