= Travis Grant =

American basketball player, small forward

Personal information
- Born: January 1, 1950 (age 76) Clayton, Alabama, U.S.
- Listed height: 6 ft 7 in (2.01 m)
- Listed weight: 215 lb (98 kg)

Career information
- High school: Barbour County Training School (Clayton, Alabama)
- College: Kentucky State (1968–1972)
- NBA draft: 1972: 1st round, 13th overall pick
- Drafted by: Los Angeles Lakers
- Playing career: 1972–1976
- Position: Small forward
- Number: 33, 42, 5

Career history
- 1972–1973: Los Angeles Lakers
- 1973–1975: San Diego Conquistadors
- 1975–1976: Kentucky Colonels
- 1976: Indiana Pacers

Career highlights
- 3× NAIA champion (1970–1972); 3× NAIA All-American (1970–1972); 2× NAIA tournament MVP (1971, 1972); 3× NABC Division II All-American (1970–1972)

Career NBA and ABA statistics
- Points: 2,767 (13.8 ppg)
- Rebounds: 819 (4.1 rpg)
- Assists: 211 (1.0 apg)
- Stats at NBA.com
- Stats at Basketball Reference
- Collegiate Basketball Hall of Fame

Travis Grant (born January 1, 1950) is an American former basketball small forward in the National Basketball Association (NBA) for the Los Angeles Lakers. He also was a member of the San Diego Conquistadors, Kentucky Colonels, and Indiana Pacers in the American Basketball Association (ABA). He played college basketball for the Kentucky State Thorobreds.

== Early years ==
Growing up in rural Alabama under Jim Crow laws, he practiced his basketball shot using a tennis ball and a cutout five-gallon bucket as a makeshift rim.

He attended Barbour County High School in Clayton, Alabama. As a senior, he was offered an opportunity to transfer to a white school, but he instead opted to stay put.

== College career ==
Grant accepted a basketball scholarship from NAIA Kentucky State University, because of his relationship with head coach Lucias Mitchell, turning down other offers.

As a freshman, he spent the first half of the season opener against Campbell College on the bench, entering the game in the second half and hitting 10 straight shots, which earned him the "Machine" nickname. He finished the season averaging 26.6 points, 9.3 rebounds, 2.6 assists and shot 61.9% from the field.

As a sophomore, he led the team to a 29–3 record and the NAIA National Championship. He averaged 35.4 points, 9.0 rebounds and shot 70% from the field. In the NAIA Tournament, he averaged 27.4 points. He also scored a school record 75 points in a regular season game against Northwood Institute.

As a junior, he led the team to a 31–2 record and a second straight NAIA National Championship. He averaged 31.2 points, 9.1 rebounds and shot 64.8% from the field. In the NAIA Tournament, he averaged 33.6 points and received the Chuck Taylor MVP Award.

As a senior, he led the team to a 28–5 record and a third straight NAIA National Championship. He averaged 39.5 points, 9.9 rebounds and shot 62% from the field. He scored 68 points against Eastern Michigan University and their star George "The Iceman" Gervin. In the NAIA tournament he scored 213 points, including a tournament single-game record of 60 points against Minot State University. He set the All-time tournament scoring record for both a season (213) and a career (518). He averaged an NAIA record 33.4 points per game over his career. He received the Chuck Taylor MVP Award for the second time in a row. He also was the first small college player to win the Lapchick Trophy-Sporting News College Basketball Player of the Year award.

Grant graduated as the all-time/all-division scoring leader in college basketball history with 4,045 points (378 more than Pistol Pete Maravich). His record was later broken by both Phil Hutcheson (4,106) and John Pierce (4,230) of Lipscomb University.

In 1987, he was inducted into the Kentucky State University Hall of Fame. In 2009, he was inducted into the College Basketball Hall of Fame. In 2011, he was inducted into the NAIA Hall of Fame. In 2012, he was named to the NAIA 75th Anniversary All-Star Team. In 2014, he was inducted into the State of Alabama Sports Hall of Fame. In 2016, he was inducted into the Small College Basketball Hall of Fame.

== Professional career ==
=== Los Angeles Lakers ===
Grant was selected by the Los Angeles Lakers in the first round (13th overall) of the 1972 NBA draft. He also was selected by the Utah Stars in the 1972 ABA draft. As a rookie, he was part of a team that included Wilt Chamberlain, Jerry West, Gail Goodrich and Pat Riley. On October 30, 1973, he was waived to make room for the recently acquired power forward Connie Hawkins.

=== San Diego Conquistadors ===
On November 22, 1973, he signed with the San Diego Conquistadors in the American Basketball Association, reuniting with Chamberlain, who was initially going to serve as a player/coach. He suffered a broken foot during the season. He averaged 15.3 points and 5.3 rebounds.

In the 1974–75 season, he compiled his best stats, when he averaged 25.2 points per game (fourth in the league) and 6.2 rebounds per game with a 54.4% field goal percentage, even though he suffered a knee injury. In November 1974, he made 17 of 23 field goal attempts and 11 free throws against the New York Nets.

On October 2, 1975, he was traded to the Kentucky Colonels in exchange for cash considerations and a third round draft choice.

=== Kentucky Colonels ===
In the 1975–76 season, he averaged 5.5 points and 1.8 rebounds. On January 12, 1976, he was traded to the Indiana Pacers, in exchange for cash considerations and a future draft choice.

=== Indiana Pacers ===
In 1976, the Indiana Pacers acquired Grant to provide depth after their leading scorer Billy Knight was lost to an injury. He averaged 9.6 points and 3.0 rebounds. He expected to play with the Pacers during the 1976–77 season, but couldn't reach a contract agreement. The contract problems also prevented the Seattle SuperSonics from inviting him to training camp.

Grant finished with a career field goal percentage of 52.4%, making 1,183 out of 2,257 shots for 2,767 points. He also registered 819 rebounds, 211 assists, 106 steals and 51 blocks.

== Career statistics ==
Legend
GP	Games played	GS	Games started	MPG	Minutes per game
FG%	Field goal percentage	3P%	3-point field goal percentage	FT%	Free throw percentage
RPG	Rebounds per game	APG	Assists per game	SPG	Steals per game
BPG	Blocks per game	PPG	Points per game	**Bold**	Career high

=== NBA/ABA ===
==== Regular season ====
Year	Team	GP	MPG	FG%	3P%	FT%	RPG	APG	SPG	BPG	PPG
1972–73	L.A. Lakers (NBA)	33	4.6	.440		**.885**	1.6	.2			3.8
1973–74	L.A. Lakers (NBA)	3	2.0	.250		.333	.3	.0	.0	.0	1.0
1973–74	San Diego (ABA)	**56**	23.6	.524	.250	.801	5.3	1.1	**.8**	.2	15.3
1974–75	San Diego (ABA)	53	**37.7**	**.544**	**.500**	.835	**6.2**	**1.8**	**.8**	**.4**	**25.2**
1975–76	Kentucky (ABA)	22	11.9	.423	–	.783	1.8	.5	.3	.2	5.5
1975–76	Indiana (ABA)	34	16.7	.531	–	.739	3.0	.9	.3	.4	9.6
Career (NBA)		36	4.4	.433		.828	1.5	.2	.0	.0	3.6
Career (ABA)		165	25.2	.529	.333	.810	4.6	1.2	.6	.3	16.0
Career (overall)		201	21.4	.524	.333	.811	4.1	1.0	.6	.3	13.8

==== Playoffs ====
Year	Team	GP	MPG	FG%	3P%	FT%	RPG	APG	SPG	BPG	PPG
1973	L.A. Lakers (NBA)	**2**	**5.5**	**.667**		–	**2.0**	.0			**4.0**
1976	Indiana (ABA)	1	1.0	.000	–	–	.0	.0	.0	.0	.0
Career (overall)		3	4.0	.571	–	–	1.3	.0	.0	.0	2.7

== Personal life ==
After his basketball career was over, he finished his degree and earned a master's degree at West Georgia University. He served 30 years as a teacher, coach and administrator, before retiring in 2010.

== Legacy ==
The March 16, 2022 game between Southeastern Louisiana and South Alabama at The Basketball Classic been designated the Travis Grant Game.
