= Carver Military Academy =

Location
- 13100 South Doty Avenue; Chicago, Illinois 60827; United States
- Coordinates: 41°39′24″N 87°35′23″W

Information
- Former name: George Washington Carver Area High School
- School type: Public; Secondary; Military
- Motto: Excellence Is Expected
- Established: 1947
- School district: Chicago Public Schools
- CEEB code: 140840
- Principal: Steven E. Rouse
- Grades: 9–12
- Gender: Coed
- Enrollment: 397 (2022–2023)
- Campus type: Urban
- Colors: Kelly green Greenbay gold
- Athletics conference: Chicago Public League
- Team name: Challengers
- Accreditation: North Central Association of Colleges and Schools
- Yearbook: The Challenger
- Website: carvermilitary.org

George Washington Carver Military Academy (formerly known as George Washington Carver Area High School) is a public four-year military high school located in the Riverdale area on the far south side of Chicago, Illinois, United States. Opened in 1947, The school is operated by the Chicago Public Schools. Carver is named for African-American scientist and educator George Washington Carver.

== History ==
The school was founded in 1947 by the Chicago Public Schools district as George Washington Carver Area High School, a neighborhood high school. Carver was established to accommodate high school-age residents of the Chicago Housing Authority's Altgeld Gardens Homes public housing complex, which opened in the area west of the school's location in 1944. By the 1997–1998 school year, Chicago Board of Education decided to phase out the school due to poor academic performance and low attendance.

In 1998, Chaplain Lt. Colonel Antonio R. Daggett, Sr. of the United States Army was called upon by then-Chicago Public Schools director Creg E. Williams, Chief Executive Officer Paul Vallas and Chicago mayor Richard M. Daley with community support to begin the transition into becoming a military academy by the year 2000.

In August 2000, the school opened as Carver Military Academy High School with a class of 250 freshmen. The first graduating class of the military school occurred in June 2004.

=== Col. Antonio R. Daggett, Sr. ===
In establishing a military academy, Col. Daggett founded the second public military high school in the United States, and the first public military high school in the country that was transitioned from an existing general public high school. The initial graduating class of cadets referred to (and then named) the flag hall outside the auditorium " Daggett Domains" as a result of Col. Daggett's decision to display all state flags there.

Chaplain Col. Daggett, who at that time was an Army Major in rank and a father of eight children, worked to secure community support and ensure that the new Military Academy focused on serving the community and its needs.

== Academics ==
Carver is rated a 5 out of 10 by GreatSchools.org, a national school quality information site.

== Athletics ==
Carver competes in the Chicago Public League (CPL) and is a member of the Illinois High School Association (IHSA). Carver sport teams are nicknamed Challengers. The boys' varsity basketball team won the 1962–1963 IHSA boys basketball championship after being the state runner-up the previous season.

== Notable alumni ==
- Joe Allen (Class of 1964) - basketball player
- Jake Anderson (Class of 2006) - basketball player for the Orangeville A's of the National Basketball League of Canada (NBL)
- Jason Avant (Class of 2002) - football player for NFL's Philadelphia Eagles and Kansas City Chiefs
- Terry Cummings (Class of 1979) - former DePaul star and NBA basketball player who played for 18 seasons, NBA Rookie of the Year (1983)
- Yolanda Griffith (Class of 1989) - ABL and WNBA basketball player, WNBA MVP, member of Women's Basketball Hall of Fame.
- Tim Hardaway (Class of 1985) - 5x NBA All-Star (1991–1993, 1997, 1998). Member of Naismith Memorial Basketball Hall of Fame.
- Renaldo Major (Class of 2000) - basketball player and coach
- Andre Moore (Class of 1982) - Basketball player
- Marlbert Pradd (Class of 1963) - NBA basketball player, selected by Chicago Bulls in 1967 NBA draft.
- Cazzie Russell (Class of 1962) - NBA and college basketball player. Former University of Michigan. #1 pick in 1966 NBA draft, member of 1970 champion New York Knicks, inductee in College Basketball Hall of Fame and NBA All-Star (1972).
