= Jimmy Jones (basketball) =

American basketball player

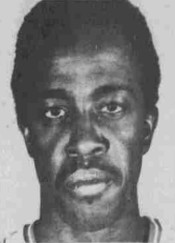

Personal information
- Born: January 1, 1945 (age 81) Tallulah, Louisiana, U.S.
- Listed height: 6 ft 4 in (1.93 m)
- Listed weight: 188 lb (85 kg)

Career information
- High school: McCall (Tallulah, Louisiana)
- College: Grambling State (1963–1967)
- NBA draft: 1967: 2nd round, 13th overall pick
- Drafted by: Baltimore Bullets
- Playing career: 1967–1977
- Position: Point guard / shooting guard
- Number: 15

Career history
- 1967–1971: New Orleans Buccaneers / Memphis Pros
- 1971–1974: Utah Stars
- 1974–1977: Washington Bullets

Career highlights
- 6× ABA All-Star (1968–1971, 1973, 1974); 3× All-ABA First Team (1969, 1973, 1974); ABA All-Rookie First Team (1968); ABA All-Time Team

Career ABA and NBA statistics
- Points: 11,366 (16.3 ppg)
- Rebounds: 2,930 (4.6 rpg)
- Assists: 3,069 (4.5 apg)
- Stats at NBA.com
- Stats at Basketball Reference

James Jones (born January 1, 1945) is an American former professional basketball player who was a six-time All-Star in the American Basketball Association (ABA), one of only four players to be named an ABA All-Star six times in its nine-year history.

A 6'4" guard born in Tallulah, Louisiana, Jones attended Grambling State University.

== Playing career ==
Jones was drafted by the National Basketball Association's (NBA) Baltimore Bullets in 1967. Jones was also drafted by the New Orleans Buccaneers in the 1967 ABA Draft. He signed for a three-year contract of $75,000 and a new car with New Orleans, feeling that he would have a better shot at getting to play significant time.

He would play seven seasons for the New Orleans Buccaneers/Memphis Pros and Utah Stars. Playing with teammates Larry Brown and Doug Moe, the Buccaneers won the inaugural Western Division title in 1968.

He averaged 20 points in the 1968 ABA playoffs when the Buccaneers reached the ABA Finals, losing in seven games to the Pittsburgh Pipers. He scored 2,000 points in the 1968–69 ABA season, second only to Larry Jones as the first 2,000-point scorers in the ABA. Jones was one of the ABA's best players, averaging 19.2 points, 5.1 assists, and 4.9 rebounds during his seven years in that league. As late as 1974, Jones was thought to be among if not the best guard in the league; Jones believed he was not among the best defensive players at his position but felt his size was comparable, reflecting as such in an interview:

I know my assets and liabilities. Like I don’t feel I’m in the top four defensive guard in the league. You’ve got guys like Mike Gale (New York), Al Smith (Denver), Fatty Taylor (Virginia), and Ted McClain (Carolina), who I feel are the top defensive guards. And I don’t feel that I’m the overpowering-type guard either. But whenever I have the height advantage on another guard, I figure I can take advantage of him. It seems like it’s a lot harder to post guys the last two years. Teams are playing tougher defense and trying to help out more. We try to clear out a side, like we do in our guard ‘41’ play, and get into a good shooting area. You really don’t have to worry about posting them or jockeying for a layup. Any time you shoot a 15-footer on them, it’s like shooting a layup in the pros.

The 1974 ABA playoffs saw the Stars reach the Finals but they lost to the New York Nets in five games. Desiring a pay raise but playing for a team that was strapped for cash, Jones finally joined the Bullets franchise that year, appearing in three seasons.

In the 1975 NBA playoffs, he tore ligaments in his right knee that required surgery, which meant he missed the 1975 NBA Finals. By 1976, he had chronic knee problems.

He played three games of the 1976–77 season before retiring due to leg problems.

== Personal life ==
His son Mike became a coach in the NCAA. As of 2026, Jones worked for Amway and as an Uber driver. He is one of 23 surviving former ABA players still seeking financial compensation from the NBA (in 2022, the league committed to pay money to 99 other players from the ABA as "recognition payments" that had played in the NBA after the merger but were struggling to meet basic needs but not the 23 players like Jones due to them receiving NBA pensions). Jones receives a small NBA check from Legends of Basketball (a marketing company for numerous NBA/ABA/WNBA players).

== ABA and NBA career statistics ==
Legend
GP	Games played	GS	Games started	MPG	Minutes per game
FG%	Field goal percentage	3P%	3-point field goal percentage	FT%	Free throw percentage
RPG	Rebounds per game	APG	Assists per game	SPG	Steals per game
BPG	Blocks per game	PPG	Points per game	**Bold**	Career high

**Bold**	Denotes career highs

=== Regular season ===
Year	Team	GP	GS	MPG	FG%	3P%	FT%	RPG	APG	SPG	BPG	PPG
1967–68	New Orleans (ABA)	78	–	**41.7**	.467	.222	.709	**5.7**	2.3	–	–	18.8
1968–69	New Orleans (ABA)	77	–	41.4	.535*	.143	.805	**5.7**	5.7	–	–	**26.6**
1969–70	New Orleans (ABA)	70	–	35.9	.497	.000	.810	4.5	4.9	–	–	20.7
1970–71	Memphis (ABA)	80	–	37.6	.486	**.571**	.778	4.8	5.9	–	–	19.6
1971–72	Utah (ABA)	78	–	37.2	.512	.167	.779	4.8	**6.2**	–	–	15.5
1972–73	Utah (ABA)	80	–	35.6	.523	.000	.799	4.2	5.6	–	–	16.7
1973–74	Utah (ABA)	**83**	–	38.1	**.550**	.000	**.884***	4.3	5.2	**1.9**	**0.4**	16.8
1974–75	Washington	73	–	19.5	.518	–	.725	5.2	1.9	1.0	0.1	7.1
1975–76	Washington	64	–	17.7	.497	–	.766	2.0	1.9	0.5	0.1	5.9
1976–77	Washington	3	–	11.0	.333	–	.500	1.3	0.3	0.7	0.0	2.0
Career		686	–	34.2	.509	.250	.785	4.3	4.5	1.2	0.2	16.6

=== Playoffs ===
Year	Team	GP	GS	MPG	FG%	3P%	FT%	RPG	APG	SPG	BPG	PPG
1968	New Orleans (ABA)	17	–	**46.2**	.457	.000	.737	**6.9**	3.3	–	–	22.1
1969	New Orleans (ABA)	11	–	40.5	.552	.000	.761	5.3	5.4	–	–	**30.2**
1971	Memphis (ABA)	4	–	32.5	.500	–	.680	6.0	3.8	–	–	16.3
1972	Utah (ABA)	11	–	39.5	.541	–	.714	4.0	**6.3**	–	–	21.0
1973	Utah (ABA)	10	–	31.6	.492	–	.795	4.1	4.3	–	–	16.3
1974	Utah (ABA)	**18**	–	41.2	**.577**	.000	.776	4.8	5.4	**1.5**	**0.3**	20.8
1975	Washington	11	–	18.7	.453	–	**.909**	2.0	1.9	**1.5**	0.1	6.2
1976	Washington	7	–	23.6	.489	–	.857	2.0	2.4	1.4	0.0	8.9
Career		89	–	36.2	.517	.000	.758	4.6	4.2	1.5	0.2	18.8

== Legacy ==
Among the most underrated players of his day, Jones was once called "the most deserving ABA candidate remaining" of players from his ABA playing days to not currently be in the Naismith Basketball Hall of Fame. Of the four six-time ABA All-Stars, Jones is the only one not in the Hall as of 2025. In 2013, he was inducted into the Louisiana Sports Hall of Fame.
