= Joe Allen (basketball) =

American basketball player (1947–1997)

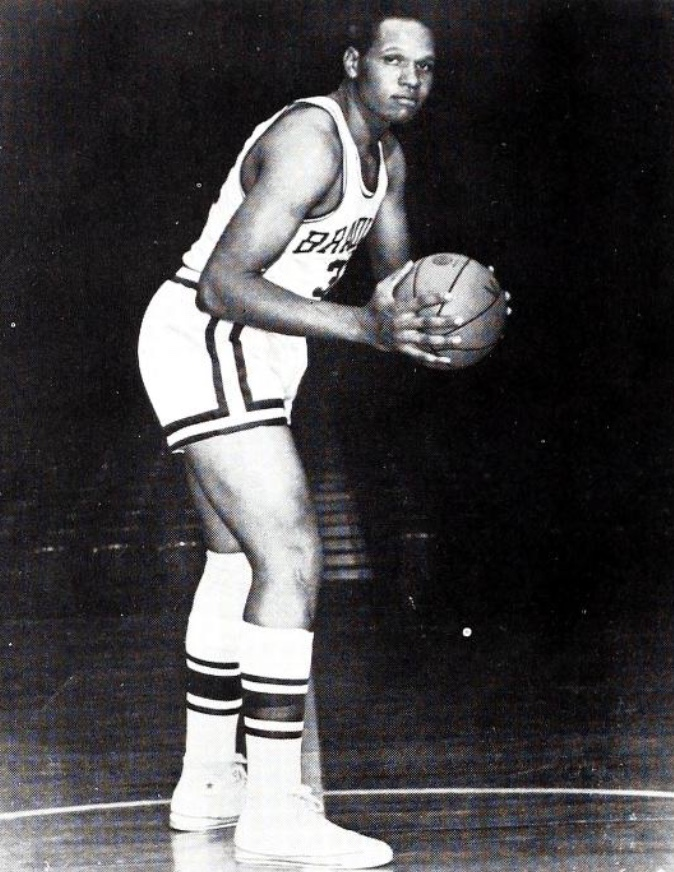
- Allen from the 1967 Anaga

Personal information
- Born: November 8, 1947 Chicago, Illinois
- Died: May 20, 1997 (aged 49) Peoria, Illinois
- Listed height: 6 ft 6 in (1.98 m)
- Listed weight: 225 lb (102 kg)

Career information
- High school: Carver (Chicago, Illinois)
- College: Bradley (1965–1968)
- NBA draft: 1967: 5th round, 47th overall pick
- Drafted by: Los Angeles Lakers
- Playing career: 1968–?
- Position: Center
- Number: 31

Career history
- 1968–1971: APU Udine

Career highlights
- 2× First-team All-MVC (1967, 1968); Second-team All-MVC (1966); No. 31 retired by Bradley Braves
- Stats at Basketball Reference

Joe Allen (November 8, 1947 – May 20, 1997) was an American basketball player who played for Bradley University in the late 1960s. A center, Allen led the Braves in rebounding and scoring each season of varsity basketball. While averaging 10.9 rebounds per game, Allen also averaged 22.2 points per game. During his senior season, Allen would lead the nation in field goal percentage, shooting over 65% from the field (.655).

== Carver High School ==
In 1962, Allen lead his Carver Military Academy basketball team to a record of 28–5 and a runner-up at the state championships, where his team lost to Stephen Decatur High School. The following season, Allen would again lead the Carver Challengers to the IHSA state title game. The team again finished with a 28–5 record, and this time won the state championship, defeating the Orphans of Centralia. Allen scored 51 points in the 1962 tournament, averaging 12.8 points per game. In the 1963 tournament, Allen scored 67 points while grabbing 40 rebounds in the four tournament games, an average of 16.8 points and 10 rebounds per game with 18 points and 17 rebounds in the title game. In eight tournament games, Allen would make 50 of 85 field goals shooting 59%.

In 1974, Allen was inducted into the Illinois Basketball Coaches Association's Hall of Fame as a player.

In 2007, the Illinois High School Association named Allen one of the 100 Legends of the IHSA Boys Basketball Tournament.

== Bradley University ==
Allen enrolled at Bradley University in the fall of 1964, however due to a knee surgery mid-season, he was forced to wear a knee-brace for the rest of his playing time at Bradley. In his sophomore year he was the starting center of the 1965–66 Braves team that finished second in the Missouri Valley with a 20–6 record. As a junior, Allen maintained his starting center role on a team that finished fourth in the conference with an overall record of 17–9. His best year came during the 1967–68 season, when Allen was named team co-captain and the Braves finished their schedule with an overall record of 19–9.

During his three years of varsity basketball, Allen recorded 13 games with 30 or more points, including a high of 45 points versus Southern California on December 9, 1966, at Robertson Fieldhouse. He recorded the first triple-double in Bradley Basketball history with 25 points, 11 rebounds and 12 assists against Oklahoma on December 20, 1966, also at Robertson Fieldhouse. Allen was named co-captain of the team prior to the 1967–1968 season and would go onto lead the nation in field goal percentage (.655) during that same year. He is one of seven Bradley Basketball players to have his uniform number retired (#31), and finished his career third on Bradley's all-time scoring list with 1,752 career points and fourth with 865 career rebounds. Allen would return to Bradley to serve as an assistant coach from 1972 to 1977.

During the 2003 season, Allen was named to the Bradley Basketball Team of the Century.
