= 1973–74 Utah Stars season =

ABA basketball team season

- Division champions
- Head coach: Joe Mullaney
- Arena: Salt Palace

Results
- Record: 51–33 (.607)
- Place: Division: 1st (ABA)
- Playoff finish: Lost in ABA Finals

The 1973–74 Utah Stars season was the fourth season of the Stars franchise in Utah and seventh overall in the American Basketball Association when including their few seasons they played in nearby California as the Anaheim Amigos and Los Angeles Stars. From January 21 to February 18, 1974, they won 14 straight games. However, a week after that, they began a 5-game losing streak, but the Stars still finished the season 18 games above .500 and as the best team in the Western Division. The Utah Stars were 8th in points scored at 105.1 per game and 4th in points allowed at 104.7 per game during this season. In the playoffs, the Stars went all the way to the ABA Finals for the second time in four seasons (third time in five seasons if you include their surprise appearance during their final season as the Los Angeles Stars before the franchise moved to the state of Utah). However, unlike their first season under the Utah Stars name, they would lose the chance to be named ABA champions once again, this time to the New York Nets (now being led by Julius Erving as their main star), in five games. As it later turned out, it would not only be the last winning season in franchise history for the team, but it'd also be the last time they'd appear in the ABA Finals altogether; unbeknownst to most fans at the time, team owner Bill Daniels would spend the 1974 year trying and failing to become the governor of nearby Colorado, with him losing his spot in the Republican National Committee that year to Governor John Vanderhoof, which later ended with Vanderhoof losing the governorship race to Democrat candidate Richard Lamm near the end of that year. His failed political bid led to him being in serious financial troubles during the franchise's final two seasons after this season ended; while Daniels tried his best to find new owners to help save the franchise for at least the short-term, to the point of even considering a merger with the eventual Spirits of St. Louis ABA franchise near the end of 1975, the failed political bid would ultimately help spell the end for the Stars franchise and their chances of making it to the 1976 ABA-NBA merger entirely.

== ABA Draft ==
Interestingly, this year's ABA draft would involve four different types of drafts throughout the early 1973 year: a "Special Circumstances Draft" on January 15, a "Senior Draft" on April 25, an "Undergraduate Draft" also on April 25, and a "Supplemental Draft" on May 18. As such, the following selections were made in these respective drafts by the Stars.

=== ABA Special Circumstances Draft ===
Round	Pick	Player	Position(s)	Nationality	College
1	8	Robert Parish	C	United States	Centenary College of Louisiana
1	9	Jimmie Baker	PF	United States	UNLV
2	19	Alvan Adams	PF/C	United States	Oklahoma

Interestingly, the Stars would be the only ABA team to have themselves acquire three different players in the "Special Circumstances Draft" (likely through trading with another ABA team like the San Diego Conquistadors or Indiana Pacers, for example), though none of them would end up joining the Stars this season, with them all deciding to stay in college for multiple years instead.

=== ABA Senior Draft ===
Round	Pick	Player	Position(s)	Nationality	College
1	8	Ronnie Robinson	PF	United States	Memphis State
2	18	Leonard Gray	PF	United States	Long Beach State
3	28	Steve Newsome	F	United States	Houston
3	30	Ted Manakas	SG	United States	Providence
4	38	Martin Terry	SG	United States	Arkansas
5	48	Pete Harris	F	United States	Stephen F. Austin State
6	58	Dave Winfield	SF	United States	Minnesota
7	68	B. G. Brosterhous	F	United States	Texas
8	78	Mike Williams	G	United States	Kentucky Wesleyan
9	88	Roy McPipe	SG	United States	Eastern Montana College (redshirt)
10	98	Melvin Russell	PG	United States	Centenary College of Louisiana

The "Senior Draft" done in April is often considered the official, main draft period of the 1973 ABA draft by basketball historians. Also, Dave Winfield is the only player to ever be drafted by not just the ABA and NBA, but also the MLB and NFL as well, though despite Winfield despite playing college basketball in his final two years at the University of Minnesota, Winfield ultimately decided to go to the San Diego Padres of the MLB, eventually being a part of the Baseball Hall of Fame as a player.

=== ABA Undergraduate Draft ===
Round	Pick	Player	Position(s)	Nationality	College
11 (1)	108 (8)	Bruce Seals	SF/PF	United States	Xavier University of Louisiana
12 (2)	118 (18)	Marvin Webster	C	United States	Morgan State

The "Undergraduate Draft" is considered a continuation of the "Senior Draft" that was done earlier that same day, hence the numbering of the rounds and draft picks here. Webster would later be considered the official #1 pick of what was considered the final ABA draft ever done when the Denver Nuggets drafted him with a bonus pick they acquired back when they were originally named the Denver Rockets due to Denver losing Marvin Barnes to the Carolina Cougars (soon to be rebranded as the Spirits of St. Louis), with Denver also obtaining David Thompson (a player drafted in the first round of the "Undergraduate Draft" by the Memphis Tams that later became the unofficial #1 pick of the 1975 ABA draft as well) by trading with the Virginia Squires a month after they selected him with the top selection of that draft on their ends, meaning the Nuggets would obtain both the official and unofficial #1 picks of that draft as "Undergraduate Draft" selections for this year's draft.

=== ABA Supplemental Draft ===
Round	Pick	Player	Position(s)	Nationality	College
1	5	Dennis Johnson	G	United States	Ferris State
2	13	Bill McCoy	G	United States	Northern Iowa
3	21	James Floyd	F	United States	Shaw University
4	28	Charles Golson	C	United States	College of Emporia
5	34	Ryan Quick	G	United States	San Francisco
6	41	Lee Colburn	F	United States	South Dakota State
7	48	Robert White	F	United States	Sam Houston State
8	54	Gary Watson	F	United States	Wisconsin
9	60	Larry Davis	F	United States	Centenary College of Louisiana
10	63	Ben Kelso	G	United States	Central Michigan
11	66	Nate Hawthorne	F	United States	Southern Illinois
12	69	John Thomas	F	United States	Joplin Junior College
13	70	Gary Black	G	United States	Rocky Mountain College
14	71	Sam Whitehead	F	United States	Oregon State
15	72	Harvey Catchings	PF/C	United States	Hardin–Simmons University

The Stars would be the only ABA team to utilize all 15 rounds of the "Supplemental Draft" that was done this year. Despite that fact, however, none of the 15 players that the Stars drafted would end up playing for them this season, though the final pick of not just that specific draft, but the entire ABA draft as a whole for this year, Harvey Catchings, would end up having a decent long-term career in the NBA a year after this draft ended. Catchings would also be the father of future Naismith Basketball Hall of Fame female player Tamika Catchings and grandfather of current college basketball player Kanon Catchings.

== Roster ==
1973–74 Utah Stars roster
Players

Pos.	No.	Player	Height	Weight	DOB	From
PF	44	John Beasley	6 ft 9 in (2.06 m)	225 lb (102 kg)	February 5, 1944	Texas A&M
C	31	Zelmo Beaty	6 ft 9 in (2.06 m)	225 lb (102 kg)	October 25, 1939	Prairie View A&M
SG	24	Ron Boone	6 ft 2 in (1.88 m)	200 lb (91 kg)	September 6, 1946	Idaho State
SG	40	Glen Combs	6 ft 2 in (1.88 m)	185 lb (84 kg)	October 30, 1946	Virginia Tech
C	14	Roy Ebron	6 ft 9 in (2.06 m)	220 lb (100 kg)	August 31, 1951	Louisiana
C	25	Gerald Govan	6 ft 10 in (2.08 m)	220 lb (100 kg)	January 2, 1942	St. Mary of the Plains College
PG	10	Mervin Jackson	6 ft 3 in (1.91 m)	175 lb (79 kg)	August 15, 1946	Utah
PG	15	Jimmy Jones	6 ft 4 in (1.93 m)	188 lb (85 kg)	January 1, 1945	Grambling State
SG	11	Rick Mount	6 ft 3 in (1.91 m)	175 lb (79 kg)	January 5, 1947	Purdue
SG	22	Johnny Neumann	6 ft 6 in (1.98 m)	200 lb (91 kg)	September 11, 1951	Mississippi
PF	33	Ronnie Robinson	6 ft 8 in (2.03 m)	200 lb (91 kg)	March 9, 1951	Memphis
SF	10	Bruce Seals	6 ft 8 in (2.03 m)	210 lb (95 kg)	June 18, 1953	Xavier (LA)
SG	12	Bob Warren	6 ft 5 in (1.96 m)	190 lb (86 kg)	July 17, 1946	Vanderbilt
SF	42	Willie Wise	6 ft 5 in (1.96 m)	210 lb (95 kg)	March 3, 1947	Drake

Coaches
Head coach
- Joe Mullaney
Assistant(s)
- Larry Creger

Legend
- (DP) Unsigned draft pick
- (FA) Free agent
- (S) Suspended
- Injured

Roster

== Final standings ==
=== Western Division ===
Team	W	L	%	GB
Utah Stars	51	33	.607	-
Indiana Pacers	46	38	.548	5
San Antonio Spurs	45	39	.536	6
Denver Rockets	37	47	.440	14
San Diego Conquistadors	37	47	.440	14

== ABA Playoffs ==
ABA Western Division Semifinals

Game	Date	Location	Score	Record	Attendance
1	March 30	Utah	114–99	1–0	5,558
2	April 1	Utah	119–105	2–0	6,242
3	April 3	San Diego	96–97	2–1	2,295
4	April 4	San Diego	98–100	2–2	2,089
5	April 6	Utah	100–93	3–2	6,648
6	April 8	San Diego	110–99	4–2	3,140

Stars win series, 4–2

ABA Western Division Finals vs Indiana Pacers

Game	Date	Location	Score	Record	Attendance
1	April 13	Utah	105–96	1–0	7,557
2	April 15	Utah	106–102	2–0	7,143
3	April 17	Indiana	99–90	3–0	6,337
4	April 18	Indiana	107–118	3–1	6,265
5	April 22	Utah	101–110	3–2	10,248
6	April 25	Indiana	89–91	3–3	9,482
7	April 27	Utah	109–87	4–3	12,191

Stars win series, 4–3

ABA Finals vs. New York Nets

Game	Date	Location	Score	Record	Attendance
1	April 30	New York	85–89	0–1	13,740
2	May 4	New York	94–118	0–2	15,934
3	May 6	Utah	100–103	0–3	10,743
4	May 8	Utah	97–89	1–3	10,254
5	May 10	New York	100–111	1–4	15,934

Stars lose series, 4–1

== Awards and honors ==
1974 ABA All-Star Game selections (game played on January 30, 1974)

- Jimmy Jones
- Willie Wise
- Ron Boone
