= Larry Bunce =

American basketball player (born 1945)

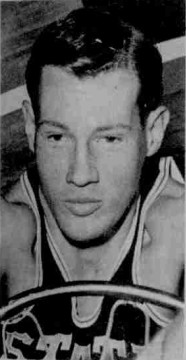

Personal information
- Born: July 29, 1945 (age 81) Tacoma, Washington, U.S.
- Listed height: 7 ft 0 in (2.13 m)
- Listed weight: 240 lb (109 kg)

Career information
- High school: Ramona (Riverside, California)
- College: Riverside CC (1964–1966); Utah State (1966–1967)
- NBA draft: 1967: 4th round, 43rd overall pick
- Drafted by: Seattle SuperSonics
- Position: Center
- Number: 52, 25, 33

Career history
- 1967–1968: Anaheim Amigos
- 1968–1969: Denver Rockets
- 1969: Dallas Chaparrals
- 1969: Houston Mavericks
- 1975: Alviks BK

Career highlights
- ABA All-Star (1968)
- Stats at Basketball Reference

Lawrence Melvin Bunce (born July 29, 1945, in Tacoma, Washington) is an American former professional basketball player. He was drafted in 1967 by the Seattle SuperSonics in the fourth round of that year's NBA draft, but opted to start and end his professional career in the ABA.

A 7'0" center from Utah State University, Bunce played two seasons (1967–1969) in the American Basketball Association as a member of the Anaheim Amigos, Denver Rockets, Dallas Chaparrals, and Houston Mavericks. He averaged 8.9 points and 6.4 rebounds in his career and appeared in the 1968 ABA All-Star Game. He was also the tallest player in the ABA during its first season of operation.

In 1970, Bunce was arrested and charged with extortion by the Riverside County, California District Attorney. Bunce sent a letter to a Riverside physician demanding $2,000 or else he would harm their family. Following Bence's arrest, a bank employee at the Security Pacific National Bank in Riverside reported to the Federal Bureau of Investigation that they had received a similar letter from Bunce demanding $1,000. Bunce pleaded guilty to the extortion charges and was fined $625 and sentenced to five years probation.

Bunce made a return to professional basketball in 1975 when he signed with Alviks BK in Stockholm, Sweden.
