= Marlbert Pradd =

American basketball player

Personal information
- Born: November 17, 1944 Chicago, Illinois, U.S.
- Died: April 27, 2014 (aged 69) New Orleans, Louisiana, U.S.
- Listed height: 6 ft 3 in (1.91 m)
- Listed weight: 170 lb (77 kg)

Career information
- High school: Carver (Chicago, Illinois)
- College: Dillard (1963–1967)
- NBA draft: 1967: 6th round, 58th overall pick
- Drafted by: Chicago Bulls
- Playing career: 1967–1969
- Position: Shooting guard
- Number: 12

Career history
- 1967–1969: New Orleans Buccaneers

Career highlights
- 3× NAIA All-American (1965–1967); 4× All-Gulf Coast Conference (1964–1967); NAIA scoring champion (1966)

Career ABA statistics
- Points: 332 (4.2 ppg)
- Rebounds: 76 (1.0 rpg)
- Assists: 26 (0.3 apg)
- Stats at Basketball Reference

Marlbert Pradd Jr. (November 17, 1944 – April 27, 2014) was an American basketball player. After a standout college basketball career with Dillard University, he played professionally in the American Basketball Association (ABA) as a member of the New Orleans Buccaneers from 1967 to 1969.

== Early life ==
Pradd was born in Chicago, Illinois. He spent his childhood as a resident of Altgeld Garden housing projects. He attended Carver High School.

== Basketball career ==
Pradd attended Dillard University where he was a NAIA All-American in from 1965 to 1967 and made the All-Gulf Coast Conference team from 1964 to 1965. He averaged 34.3 points in 19 games as a freshman and 35.4 points in 27 games during his sophomore season. He led the NAIA in scoring during his junior season, averaging 39.1 points in 20 games. During his senior season, he averaged 42.0 points per game. He finished his career as the leading scorer in Dillard history, with 2,907 points for a 37.5 average. (Note: Louisiana Basketball Hall of Fame states that he scored 2,907 points for a 37.5 average while The Louisiana Weekly states he scored 2,857 career points.) He was subsequently drafted by the Chicago Bulls during the sixth round of the 1967 NBA draft. In May 1967, he signed with New Orleans Buccaneers of the American Basketball Association. He played two seasons for the Buccaneers before being waived in September 1969. In 2003, he was selected to the Louisiana Basketball Hall of Fame.
