= ABA All-Time Team =

Pioneer team chosen during the 30th anniversary of ABA in 1997

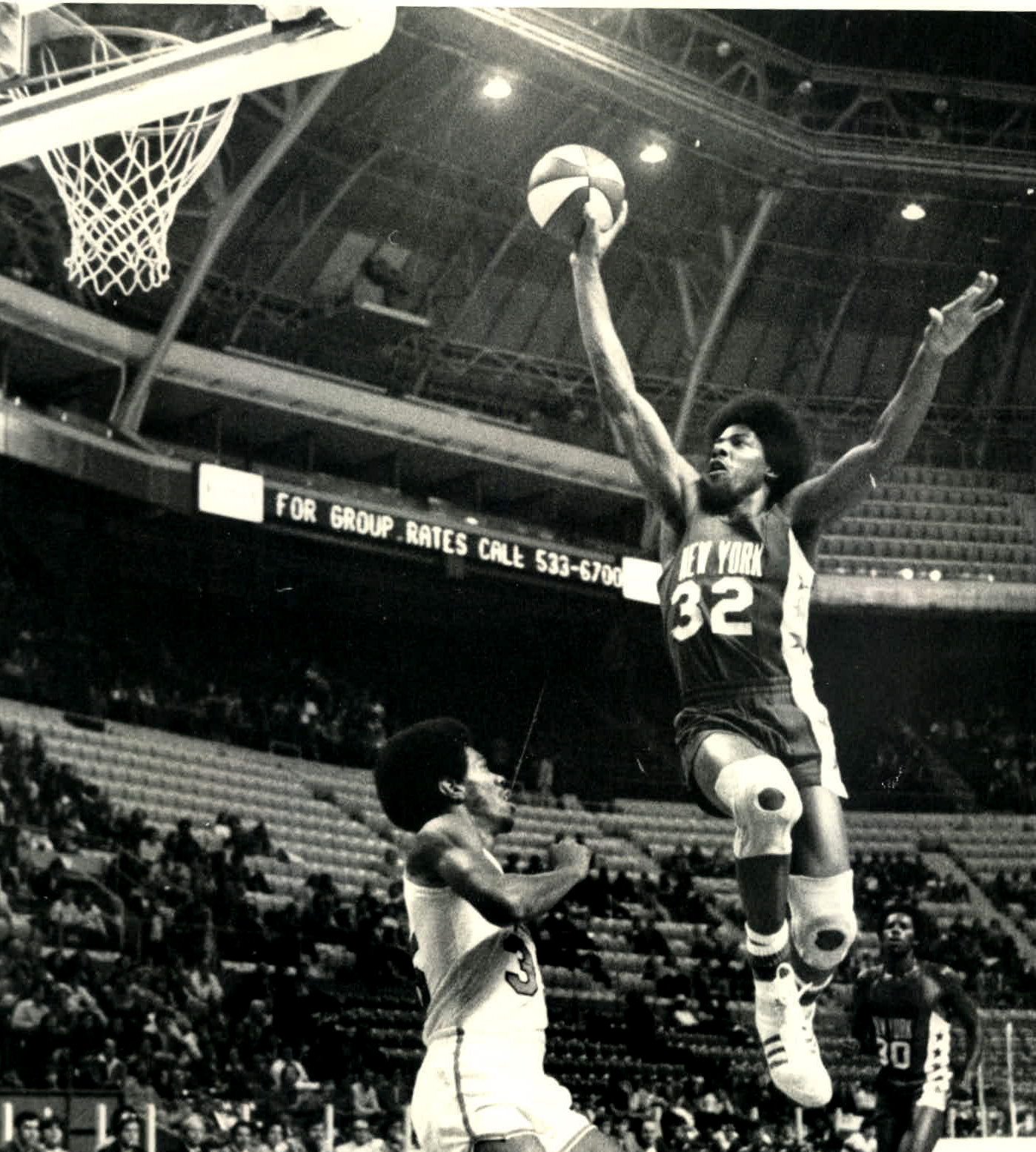
Julius Erving performing a slam dunk against the Spirit of St. Louis on November 6, 1974, at the St. Louis Arena, St. Louis, Missouri

The ABA All-Time Team were chosen in 1997 on the 30th anniversary of the founding of the American Basketball Association (ABA). It comprised the 30 best and most influential players of the ABA during its ten years and nine full regular seasons of operation, with respect not only to performance at the professional level, but in consideration of sportsmanship, team leadership, and contributions to the growth of the league basketball, and irrespective of positions played. Only players who have played at least a portion of their careers in the ABA were eligible for selection, although performance in other leagues, most notably the National Basketball Association was considered. Selected and announced beside the all-time team were a most valuable player and top head coach.

The team, announced in Indianapolis, Indiana, on August 23, 1997, in conjunction with an ABA reunion, was compiled based upon unranked voting by 50 selected panelists, among whom were members of the print and broadcast news media who have reported on and announced games for the ABA, former referees (ten), former team owners (six), former league executives (including two former sports commissioners), and selected fans and statisticians; former players, even those to have held other positions within the league, were proscribed from voting.

== Players ==
=== Team ===
==== First team ====
*	Elected to the Naismith Memorial Basketball Hall of Fame as a player

Of the 30 players elected to the first team, three served primarily as point guards during their ABA service, eight as shooting guards, five as small forwards, eight as power forwards, and six as centers. The franchises most represented were the Virginia Squires (having also competed as the Washington Capitals and Oakland Oaks), with eleven first team players' having played at least one game for one or more iterations of the franchise; Utah Stars (having also completed as the Los Angeles Stars and Anaheim Amigos), eight players; Indiana Pacers, seven players; San Antonio Spurs (having also competed as the Texas and Dallas Chaparrals), six players; Denver Nuggets (having also competed as the Denver Rockets), five players; and Spirits of St. Louis (having also competed as the Carolina Cougars and Houston Mavericks), five players.

Five players elected to the first team—Rick Barry, Billy Cunningham, Julius Erving, George Gervin, and Moses Malone—were named one year earlier to the NBA's 50 Greatest Players list.

Name	Position	Team(s) played for (years)	Championships won	Award(s) won	Year of Hall of Fame induction as player	Votes	Ref.
Marvin Barnes	F/C	Spirits of St. Louis (1974–1976)	None	ABA Rookie of the Year (1975); All-Rookie First Team (1975); All-ABA Second Team (1975)	None	23	
Rick Barry	F	Oakland Oaks (1968–1969); Washington Capitals (1969–1970); New York Nets (1970–1972)	1969	All-ABA First Team (1969–1972)	1987	39	
Zelmo Beaty	C	Utah Stars (1970–1974)	1971	ABA Playoffs Most Valuable Player Award (1971); All-ABA Second Team (1971–1972)	2016	42	
Ron Boone	G/F	Dallas Chaparrals (1968–1971); Utah Stars (1970–1975); Spirits of St. Louis (1975–1976)	1971	All-ABA First Team (1975); All-ABA Second Team (1974)	None	35	
Roger Brown	F/G	Indiana Pacers (1967–1975); Memphis Sounds (1974–1975); Utah Stars (1974–1975)	1970, 1972, 1973	ABA Playoffs Most Valuable Player Award (1970); All-ABA First Team (1971); All-ABA Second Team (1968, 1970)	2013	50	
Mack Calvin	G	Los Angeles Stars (1969–1970); The Floridians (1970–1972); Carolina Cougars (1972–1974); Denver Nuggets (1974–1975); Virginia Squires (1975–1976)	None	All-Rookie First Team (1970); All-ABA First Team (1971, 1974–1975); All-ABA Second Team (1973)	None	41	
Darel Carrier	G	Kentucky Colonels (1967–1972); Memphis Tams (1972–1973)	None	None	None	24	
Billy Cunningham	F/C	Carolina Cougars (1972–1974)	None	ABA Most Valuable Player Award (1973); All-ABA First Team (1973)	1986	36	
Louie Dampier	G	Kentucky Colonels (1967–1976)	1975	All-Rookie First Team (1968); All-ABA Second Team (1967–1970, 1974)	2015	50	
Mel Daniels	C	Minnesota Muskies (1967–1968); Indiana Pacers (1968–1974); Memphis Sounds (1974–1975)	1970, 1972, 1973	ABA Rookie of the Year (1968); ABA Most Valuable Player Award (1969, 1971); All-ABA First Team (1968–1971); All-ABA Second Team (1973)	2012	50	
Julius Erving	F/G	Virginia Squires (1971–1973); New York Nets (1973–1976)	1974, 1976	ABA Most Valuable Player Award (1974–1976); ABA Playoffs Most Valuable Player Award (1974, (1976); All-ABA First Team (1973–1976); All-ABA Second Team (1972); All-Rookie First Team (1972); All-Defensive First Team (1976)	1993	50	
Donnie Freeman	G	Minnesota Muskies (1967–1968); Miami Floridians (1968–1970); Utah Stars (1970–1971); Texas Chaparrals (1970–1972); Indiana Pacers (1972–1974); San Antonio Spurs (1974–1975)	1973	All-ABA First Team (1972); All-ABA Second Team (1969–1971)	None	30	
George Gervin	G/F	Virginia Squires (1972–1974); San Antonio Spurs (1973–1976)	None	All-ABA Second Team (1975–1976)	1996	50	
Artis Gilmore	C	Kentucky Colonels (1971–1976)	1975	Rookie of the Year (1972); ABA Most Valuable Player Award (1972); All-ABA First Team (1972–1976); All-Defensive First Team (1973–1976); All-Rookie First Team (1972); ABA Playoffs Most Valuable Player Award (1975)	2011	50	
Connie Hawkins	F	Pittsburgh Pipers (1967–1969)	1968	1968 Most Valuable Player Award; ABA Playoffs Most Valuable Player Award (1968); First team: 1967–68, 1968–69; Second team: None	1992	40	
Spencer Haywood	C	Denver Rockets (1969–1970)	None	1970 ABA Most Valuable Player Award; 1969–70 ABA Rookie of the Year; 1970 ABA All-Star Game Most Valuable Player Award; First team: 1969–70; Second team: None	2015	34	
Dan Issel	F	Kentucky Colonels (1970–1975); Denver Nuggets (1975–1976)	1975	1970–71 ABA Rookie of the Year; ABA All-Star Game Most Valuable Player Award (1972); First team: 1971–72; Second team: 1970–71, 1972–73, 1973–74, 1974–75	1993	50	
Warren Jabali	G	Oakland Oaks (1968–1969); Washington Capitals (1969–1970); Indiana Pacers (1970–1971); The Floridians (1971–1972); Denver Rockets (1972–1974); San Diego Conquistadors (1974–1975)	1969	ABA Playoffs Most Valuable Player Award (1969); 1968–69 ABA Rookie of the Year; 1972–73 All-Star Game Most Valuable Player; First team: 1972–73; Second team: None	None	24	
Jimmy Jones	G	New Orleans Buccaneers (1967–1970); Memphis Pros (1970–1971); Utah Stars (1971–1974)	None	First team: 1968–69, 1972–73, 1973–74; Second team: None	None	27	
Freddie Lewis	G	Indiana Pacers (1967–1974); Memphis Sounds (1974–1975); Spirits of St. Louis (1975–1976)	1970, 1972, 1973	1971–72 ABA Playoffs Most Valuable Player; 1975 ABA All-Star Game Most Valuable Player Award	None	38	
Maurice Lucas	F	Spirits of St. Louis (1974–1976); Kentucky Colonels (1975–1976)	None	None	None	26	
Moses Malone	C	Utah Stars (1974–1975); Spirits of St. Louis (1975–1976)	None	None	2001	30	
George McGinnis	F	Indiana Pacers (1971–1975)	1972, 1973	ABA Playoffs Most Valuable Player Award (1973); 1974–75 ABA Most Valuable Player Award; First team: 1973–74, 1974–75; Second team: 1972–73	2017	44	
Doug Moe	F	New Orleans Buccaneers (1967–1968); Oakland Oaks (1968–1969); Carolina Cougars (1969–1970); Virginia Squires (1970–1972)	1969	First team: 1967–68; Second team: 1968–69	None	35	
Bob Netolicky	F	Indiana Pacers (1967–1972, 1973–1976); Dallas Chaparrals (1972–1973); San Antonio Spurs (1973–1974)	1970, 1972	First team: None; Second team: 1969–70	None	35	
Billy Paultz	C	New York Nets (1970–1975); San Antonio Spurs (1975–1976)	1974	None	None	30	
Charlie Scott	G	Virginia Squires (1970–1972)	None	1970–71 ABA Rookie of the Year; First team: 1970–71; Second team: 1971–72	2018	29	
James Silas	G	Dallas Chaparrals (1972–1973); San Antonio Spurs (1973–1976)	None	First team: 1975–76; Second team: 1974–75	None	30	
David Thompson	G	Denver Nuggets (1975–1976)	None	ABA All-Star Game Most Valuable Player Award (1976); 1975–76 ABA Rookie of the Year; First team: None; Second team: 1975–76	1996	28	
Willie Wise	F	Los Angeles Stars (1969–1970); Utah Stars (1970–1974); Virginia Squires (1974–1976)	1971	First team: None; Second team: 1971–72, 1973–74; Defensive team: 1971–72, 1973–74	None	32	

==== Others receiving votes ====
Ninety-nine players received at least one vote. In addition to those who were selected, 13 players earned votes from at least 25 percent (12.5) of voters:

Player	Position primarily played	ABA team(s) played for	All-ABA honors won	Year of Hall of Fame induction as player	Votes accrued
Billy Keller	PG	Indiana Pacers (1969–70—1975–76)	None	None	21
Larry Brown	PG	New Orleans Buccaneers (1967–68); Oakland Oaks (1968–69); Washington Capitals (1969–70); Denver Rockets (1970–71); Virginia Squires (1970–71—1971–1972)	First team: None; Second team: 1967–68	None	19
Bobby Jones	PF	Denver Nuggets (1974–75—1975–76)	First team: None; Second team: 1975–76; Defensive team: 1974–75, 1975–76	2019	19
John Williamson	SG	New York Nets (1973–74—1975–76)	None	None	19
Red Robbins	C	New Orleans Buccaneers (1967–68—1969–70); Utah Stars (1970–71—1971–72); San Diego Conquistadors (1972–73—1973–74); Kentucky Colonels (1973–74—1974–75); Virginia Squires (1974–75)	Second team: 1968–69, 1969–70	None	18
Steve Jones	SF	Oakland Oaks (1967–68); New Orleans Buccaneers (1968–69—1969–70); Memphis Pros (1970–71); Dallas Chaparrals (1971–72—1972–73); Carolina Cougars (1972–73—1973–1974); Denver Rockets (1973–74); Spirits of St. Louis (1974–1975)	None	None	18
Larry Kenon	PF	New York Nets (1973–74—1974–75); San Antonio Spurs (1975–76)	None	None	17
Ralph Simpson	SG	Denver Nuggets (1970–71—1975–76)	First team: 1975–76; Second team: 1971–72, 1972–73	None	17
John Brisker	SF	Pittsburgh Pipers (1969–70—1971–72)	First team: None; Second team: 1970–71	None	16
Joe Caldwell	SG	Carolina Cougars (1970–71—1973–74); Spirits of St. Louis (1974–75)	First team: None; Second team: 1970–71; Defensive team: 1972–73	None	16
Billy Knight	SF	Indiana Pacers (1974–75—1975–76)	First team: 1975–76; Second team: None	None	16
Caldwell Jones	C	San Diego Conquistadors (1973–74—1975–76); Kentucky Colonels (1975–76); Spirits of St. Louis {1975–76)	None	None	14
Larry Jones	SG	Denver Rockets (1967–1968—1969–70); The Floridians (1970–71—1971–72); Dallas Chaparrals (1972–73); Utah Stars (1972–73)	First team: 1967–68, 1968–69, 1969–70	None	13

=== Most valuable player ===
Only four players received votes from the 50 panelists as the league's all-time most valuable player; small forward Julius Erving was the clear winner of the award.

Player	ABA team(s) played for	Votes
Julius Erving	Virginia Squires (1971–72—1972–73); New York Nets (1973–74—1975–76)	46
Mel Daniels	Minnesota Muskies (1967–68); Indiana Pacers (1968–69—1973–74); Memphis Sounds (1974–75)	2
Artis Gilmore	Kentucky Colonels (1971–72—1975–76)	1
Connie Hawkins	Pittsburgh Pipers (1967–68—1968–69)	1

== Coaches ==
Seven coaches received votes from at least one of the 50 panelists; having claimed 34 of the available votes, Bobby "Slick" Leonard was the clear winner of the all-time best head coach award. Larry Brown, having received 16 votes for the players team, also received six votes in view of his coaching.

Each of four franchises was represented by two coaches: the Denver Nuggets (having also competed as the Denver Rockets), the Kentucky Colonels, the Memphis Sounds (having also competed as the Memphis Tams, Memphis Pros, and New Orleans Buccaneers), and the San Antonio Spurs (having also competed as the Texas and Dallas Chaparrals).

*	Elected to the Naismith Memorial Basketball Hall of Fame

Coach	ABA team(s) coached	Overall ABA regular season coaching record (winning percentage in parentheses)	League championships won as coach	League award(s) won as coach	Year of Hall of Fame induction as coach	Votes accrued
Bobby "Slick" Leonard	Indiana Pacers (1968–1976)	387 wins-270 losses (.589)	1970, 1972, 1973	None	2014	34
Larry Brown	Carolina Cougars (1972–73–1973–74); Denver Nuggets (1974–1976)	229 wins-107 losses (.682)	None	1973, 1975, 1976 ABA Coach of the Year Awards	2002	6
Hubie Brown	Kentucky Colonels (1974–1976)	104 wins-64 losses (.619)	1975	None	None	4
Babe McCarthy	New Orleans Buccaneers (1967–68–1969–70); Memphis Pros (1970–71–1971–72); Dallas Chaparrals (1972–73); Kentucky Colonels (1973–74)	280 wins-284 losses (.496)	None	1974 ABA Coach of the Year Award	None	2
Bill Sharman	Los Angeles/Utah Stars (1968–1971)	133 wins-113 losses (.541)	1971	1970 ABA Coach of the Year Award	2004	2
Al Bianchi	Washington Caps (1969–70); Virginia Squires (1970–71–1975–76)	230 wins-281 losses (.450)	None	1971 ABA Coach of the Year Award	None	1
Bob Bass	Denver Rockets (1967–1969); The Floridians (1970–71–1971–72); Memphis Tams (1972–73); San Antonio Spurs (1974–1976)	251 wins-249 losses (.502)	None	None	None	1

== See also ==
- All-Time NBL Team (United States)
