= George McGinnis =

American basketball player (1950–2023)

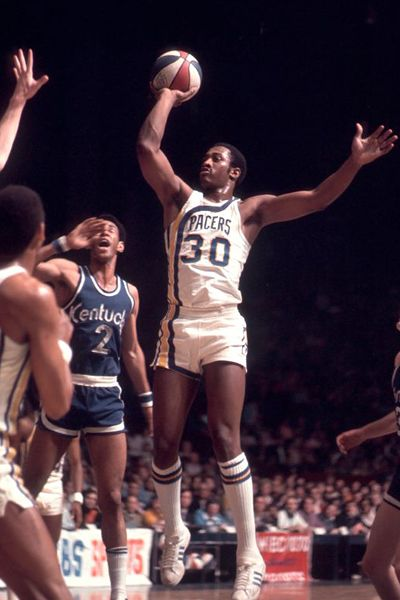
- McGinnis with the Indiana Pacers during a game in the 1972–73 season versus the Kentucky Colonels

Personal information
- Born: August 12, 1950 Harpersville, Alabama, U.S.
- Died: December 14, 2023 (aged 73) Indianapolis, Indiana, U.S.
- Listed height: 6 ft 8 in (2.03 m)
- Listed weight: 235 lb (107 kg)

Career information
- High school: George Washington (Indianapolis, Indiana)
- College: Indiana (1970–1971)
- NBA draft: 1973: 2nd round, 22nd overall pick
- Drafted by: Philadelphia 76ers
- Playing career: 1971–1982
- Position: Power forward
- Number: 30

Career history
- 1971–1975: Indiana Pacers
- 1975–1978: Philadelphia 76ers
- 1978–1980: Denver Nuggets
- 1980–1982: Indiana Pacers

Career highlights
- 3× NBA All-Star (1976, 1977, 1979); All-NBA First Team (1976); All-NBA Second Team (1977); 2× ABA champion (1972, 1973); ABA Playoffs MVP (1973); ABA MVP (1975); 3× ABA All-Star (1973–1975); 2× All-ABA First Team (1974, 1975); All-ABA Second Team (1973); ABA All-Rookie First Team (1972); ABA scoring champion (1975); ABA All-Time Team; No. 30 retired by Indiana Pacers; Third-team All-American – AP, NABC, UPI (1971); Mr. Basketball USA (1969); First-team Parade All-American (1969); Indiana Mr. Basketball (1969)

Career ABA and NBA statistics
- Points: 17,009 (20.2 ppg)
- Rebounds: 9,233 (11.0 rpg)
- Assists: 3,089 (3.7 apg)
- Stats at NBA.com
- Stats at Basketball Reference
- Basketball Hall of Fame

George F. McGinnis (August 12, 1950 – December 14, 2023) was an American professional basketball player who played 11 seasons in the American Basketball Association (ABA) and National Basketball Association (NBA). He played college basketball for the Indiana Hoosiers, earning third-team All-American honors in 1971, before starting his pro career in the ABA with the Indiana Pacers. A three-time ABA All-Star with the Pacers, McGinnis was named the ABA Most Valuable Player (MVP) in 1975 and won two ABA championships with the team. He was a three-time NBA All-Star with the Philadelphia 76ers. He was named to the ABA All-Time Team and inducted into the Naismith Memorial Basketball Hall of Fame.

== Early life ==
George F. McGinnis was born in Harpersville, Alabama, on August 12, 1950, but grew up in Indianapolis, where he attended Washington High School. He and teammate Steve Downing led Washington to a 31–0 record and a state championship in 1969. McGinnis set an Indiana state tournament scoring record with 148 points in his final four games. He was also named Mr. Basketball for the state of Indiana that year. McGinnis lost his father in the midst of his senior season when Burnie died in a construction accident.

McGinnis also played football in high school, serving as wide receiver and defensive end, and he later stated that his best sport was "probably football", which he didn't even like as much as basketball.

== College career ==
In the 1970–71 season at Indiana University Bloomington, McGinnis became the first sophomore to lead the Big Ten in scoring and rebounding. He averaged 29.9 points per game in his lone season with the Hoosiers, earning All-American and All-Big Ten Honors in 1971. He played for coach Lou Watson, the year before Indiana hired Bob Knight.

== Professional career ==
=== Indiana Pacers (1971–1975) ===
McGinnis immediately became one of the marquee players of the ABA, playing a key role on the Indiana Pacers' championship teams in each of his first two seasons with his hometown franchise. He was named the ABA Playoffs MVP in 1973, averaging 23.9 points and 12.3 rebounds in 18 playoff games to help the Pacers repeat as champs. His best season came in 1974–75, when McGinnis scored a career-high 29.8 points and also recorded a career-high 6.3 assists per game en route to ABA MVP honors. In the 1975 ABA Playoffs, he nearly averaged a triple-double (32.3 points, 15.9 rebounds, and 8.2 assists in 18 games), but the Pacers fell short of the title, losing to Kentucky in the ABA Finals. However, in these playoffs, McGinnis established multiple statistical feats. Against the San Antonio Spurs in Game 4 of the 1975 ABA Western Division Semifinals on April 12, 1975, McGinnis recorded the first 50+ point triple-double in NBA/ABA Playoff history with 51 points, 17 rebounds, and 10 assists, a feat later matched by Russell Westbrook of the Oklahoma City Thunder in 2017.

McGinnis also became the first player in NBA/ABA history to record 200+ points, 100+ rebounds, and 50+ assists in a single playoff series, which he accomplished twice in back-to-back series. In six games against the San Antonio Spurs in the 1975 ABA Western Division Semifinals, he registered totals of 230 points (38.3 per game), 113 rebounds (18.8 per game), and 55 assists (9.2 per game). In seven games against the Denver Nuggets in the 1975 ABA Western Division Finals, McGinnis registered totals of 214 points (30.6 per game), 103 rebounds (14.7 per game), and 61 assists (8.7 per game). Giannis Antetokounmpo of the Milwaukee Bucks is the only other player to replicate this, doing so in the 2022 Eastern Conference Semifinals. McGinnis became the first player in NBA/ABA history to lead the playoffs in total points (581), total rebounds (286), and total assists (148) — a feat matched only by Nikola Jokić of the Denver Nuggets in the 2023 NBA Playoffs.

=== Philadelphia 76ers (1975–1978) ===
Two years into his professional career, McGinnis was selected by the Philadelphia 76ers as the 22nd overall pick in the second round of the 1973 NBA draft. In October 1974, the 76ers were ready to send McGinnis' draft rights to the New York Knicks with the stipulation that the latter ballclub signs him before the agreed-upon deadline. The deal fell through when he decided to stay with the Pacers and signed a two-year contract with an $85,000 buyout clause which was exercised following the 1974–75 season. Preferring to play in New York City because of its financial endorsement opportunities, McGinnis sought a preliminary injunction and restraining order against the NBA on May 23, 1975, that would have permitted him to negotiate with any of the league's 18 teams. The lawsuit was dropped a week later on May 30 when he signed a six‐year $2.4 million contract with the Knicks in a challenge to the league's constitution. In his first action as new NBA commissioner on June 5, Larry O'Brien disapproved the contract and ordered the Knicks to forfeit its first selection in the 1976 NBA draft and reimburse the 76ers for all expenses relevant to the dispute. McGinnis signed a six‐year, $3.2 million guaranteed, no‐cut, no‐trade, no-option contract with the 76ers five weeks later on July 10, 1975.

In his first postseason with them in 1976, he scored 34 points in one game but fouled out of another as the 76ers lost to the Buffalo Braves in three games. It was McGinnis who ultimately held sway when the 76ers elected to pay millions of dollars to acquire Julius Erving, as both head coach Gene Shue and GM Pat Williams approached him about the negotiations, and he stated that he was fine with them going forward. McGinnis made the All-NBA First Team in his debut season with the 76ers in 1976, and was selected to two All-Star games in his three seasons with the team. While in Philadelphia, he teamed up with fellow ABA alumni Julius Erving and Caldwell Jones. The attention was particularly high for the first season with Erving and McGinnis, with the latter stating "I think most of white America thought of us as a bunch of bigmouth, cocky, high-priced niggers. There will never, ever be another team like that." McGinnis helped propel the 76ers through the playoffs to the NBA Finals in 1977 by averaging 14.2 points, 10.4 rebounds, and 3.6 assists per playoff game, but McGinnis suffered a severe groin pull in the midst of the Finals that had to see him take cortisone and xylocaine shots to numb his left leg from his hip to knee that affected his jumping. He scored 28 points in Game 6 but missed a shot at the end of a close game that saw the Portland Trail Blazers clinch the championship; McGinnis, defending himself as not being the reason the team lost, admitted that he had "played poorly the whole series". He was traded at the end of the 1977–78 season. McGinnis was reported to have snuck cigarettes in practice to smoke and by this point, the 76ers had been ready to try and trade him for a year with his practice habits.

=== Denver Nuggets (1978–1980) ===
McGinnis was traded to the Denver Nuggets in 1978 for Bobby Jones and Ralph Simpson along a switch of first-round draft picks. In his one full season with the Nuggets, he averaged 22.6 points with 11.4 rebounds and 3.7 assists in 76 games while being named to the All-Star Game. However, he tore ligaments in his left ankle near the end of the season and missed the entire playoffs, complete with having a leg put in a cast that saw him gain weight. On January 9, 1980, McGinnis scored an NBA career-high 43 points (His career high is 58 points in the ABA), along with grabbing 12 rebounds, in a game against the Houston Rockets. 56 games into the 1979–80 season, he was traded.

=== Return to Indiana (1980–1982) ===
Hoping to boost sagging attendance in their early NBA years, the Pacers re-acquired McGinnis by trading away young forward Alex English. However, McGinnis was beyond his prime, averaging a comparatively low 13.1 points per game during the 1980-81 NBA season, and was unable to help the Pacers past their first round matchup against the 76ers in the 1981 NBA Playoffs, only scoring ten points in the two-game series, while English went on to be a multiple time all-star and franchise player for the Nuggets. By March 1982, he was asked about his state of play: "Being the type of sensitive person I am, if I don't feel good vibes from the people I'm playing for, I don't shoot well, I don't pass well, I don't do nothing well. If I'd had the inner strength, there's no telling what I would have done.... It hasn't been easy for me."

At the end of the 1982 season, the Pacers called McGinnis to say that they were not going to re-sign him. He never played again, essentially retiring at the age of 31.

== Legacy ==
McGinnis is one of four players (the others are Roger Brown, Reggie Miller, and Mel Daniels) to have his jersey (No. 30) retired by the Pacers. All four are also members of the Basketball Hall of Fame.

On April 1, 2017, it was announced that McGinnis was part of the 2017 class for the Naismith Memorial Basketball Hall of Fame, alongside Tracy McGrady, Bill Self, and Rebecca Lobo. He was inducted on September 8.

== Personal life ==
McGinnis married Lynda Dotson in 1976, and they were together until her death in 2019.

McGinnis's health declined in his last years, primarily due to back problems that required multiple surgeries. He died of heart complications at a hospital in Indianapolis, on December 14, 2023, at age 73.

== Career statistics ==
Legend
GP	Games played	GS	Games started	MPG	Minutes per game
FG%	Field goal percentage	3P%	3-point field goal percentage	FT%	Free throw percentage
RPG	Rebounds per game	APG	Assists per game	SPG	Steals per game
BPG	Blocks per game	PPG	Points per game	**Bold**	Career high
*	Led the league

†	Denotes seasons in which McGinnis's team won an ABA championship

=== ABA/NBA ===
==== Regular season ====
Year	Team	GP	GS	MPG	FG%	3P%	FT%	RPG	APG	SPG	BPG	PPG
1971–72†	Indiana (ABA)	73		29.8	.465	.158	.645	9.7	1.9			16.5
1972–73†	Indiana (ABA)	**82**		**40.8**	**.495**	.250	.665	12.5	2.5	2.0		27.6
1973–74	Indiana (ABA)	80		**40.8**	.468	.147	.683	**15.0**	3.3	2.0	.5	25.9
1974–75	Indiana (ABA)	79		40.4	.451	**.354**	.724	14.3	**6.3**	**2.6**	**.7**	**29.8***
1975–76	Philadelphia	77	77	38.3	.417		**.740**	12.6	4.7	**2.6**	.5	23.0
1976–77	Philadelphia	79	**78**	35.1	.458		.681	11.5	3.8	2.1	.5	21.4
1977–78	Philadelphia	78	76	32.5	.463		.716	10.4	3.8	1.8	.3	20.3
1978–79	Denver	76		33.6	.474		.665	11.4	3.7	1.7	.7	22.6
1979–80	Denver	45		31.6	.459	.143	.541	10.3	4.9	1.5	.4	15.6
1979–80	Indiana	28		28.0	.437	.125	.575	8.5	4.0	1.1	.2	13.2
1980–81	Indiana	69		26.7	.453	.000	.538	7.7	3.0	1.4	.4	13.1
1981–82	Indiana	76	4	17.6	.373	.000	.453	5.2	2.7	1.3	.4	4.7
Career (ABA)		314		38.2	.470	.290	.682	12.9	3.5	2.2	.6	25.2
Career (NBA)		528	235	30.7	.448	.080	.651	9.8	3.8	1.7	.4	17.2
Career (overall)		842	235	33.5	.458	.273	.664	11.0	3.7	1.9	.5	20.2
All-Star (ABA)		3		32.0	.460	.000	.529	12.7	2.7	1.7	.7	18.3
All-Star (NBA)		3	2	23.3	.367		.471	6.7	2.3	3.0	.0	10.0
All-Star (overall)		6	2	27.7	.425	.000	.500	9.7	2.5	2.3	.3	14.2

==== Playoffs ====
Year	Team	GP	GS	MPG	FG%	3P%	FT%	RPG	APG	SPG	BPG	PPG
1972†	Indiana (ABA)	**20**		31.7	.406	.267	.627	11.4	2.6			15.5
1973†	Indiana (ABA)	18		40.6	.451	.000	.732	12.3	2.2			23.9
1974	Indiana (ABA)	14		**41.8**	.456	.286	.744	11.9	3.4	1.1	.4	24.0
1975	Indiana (ABA)	18		40.6	.468	**.315**	.688	**15.9**	**8.2**	**2.0**	.6	**32.3**
1976	Philadelphia	3		40.0	**.475**		.611	13.7	4.0	.3	**1.3**	**23.0**
1977	Philadelphia	19		31.7	.374		.570	10.4	3.6	1.2	.3	14.2
1978	Philadelphia	10		27.3	.424		**.837**	7.8	3.0	1.5	.1	14.7
1981	Indiana	2		19.5	.200	–	.500	5.0	3.5	1.0	.0	5.0
Career (ABA)		70		38.3	.449	.290	.695	12.9	4.1	1.6	.5	23.7
Career (NBA)		34		30.4	.395	–	.640	9.6	3.5	1.2	.3	14.6
Career (overall)		104		35.7	.435	.290	.682	11.8	3.9	1.4	.4	20.7

== ABA and NBA achievements ==
- Member of the 1972 and 1973 Indiana Pacers ABA championship teams.
- 1973 ABA Playoffs MVP.
- Second Team All-ABA selection in 1973.
- Two All-ABA First Team selections (1974–1975).
- Three ABA All-Star selections (1973–1975).
- Selected as ABA Co-MVP, with Julius Erving, in 1975.
- Won the ABA scoring title in 1975.
- Recorded 14 known triple-doubles in the ABA, including 5 playoff triple-doubles, both of which are more than anyone else during the league's lifespan.
- Led the NBA in triple-doubles with a total of 5 during the 1975–76 season, along with Alvan Adams of the Phoenix Suns and Kareem Abdul-Jabbar of the Los Angeles Lakers.
- First Team All-NBA selection in 1976.
- Second Team All-NBA selection in 1977.
- Three NBA All-Star selections (1976, 1977, and 1979).
- Member of the ABA's All-Time Team.
- Number retired by Indiana Pacers.
- Inducted into Naismith Basketball Hall of Fame in September 2017.
- Inducted into IU Athletics Hall of Fame in September 2023.
