= 1972–73 Indiana Pacers season =

ABA professional basketball team season

- ABA champions
- Head coach: Bobby Leonard
- Arena: Indiana State Fairgrounds Coliseum

Results
- Record: 51–33 (.607)
- Place: Division: 2nd (Eastern)
- Playoff finish: ABA Champions (Defeated Colonels 4–3)
- Stats at Basketball Reference

Local media
- Television: WLWI 13
- Radio: WIBC

The 1972–73 Indiana Pacers season was the franchise's sixth season both as a team and in the American Basketball Association. The Pacers entered the season looking to repeat as champions of the ABA, as well as win a record-high third ABA championship in four years after previously winning the ABA Finals in 1970 and 1972. Indiana finished the season by being second place in the Western Division with a 51–31 record, finishing behind only the Utah Stars by four games, before winning their third ABA title in seven games. In a rematch of the 1972 Western Division Semifinals, the Pacers eliminated the Denver Rockets 4–1 this time around after going to seven games with them the last time they met. After defeating the Rockets in five games, the Pacers eliminated the Utah Stars in their 1972 Western Division Finals rematch in six games after previously beating them in seven games last year. The Eastern Division champion Kentucky Colonels appeared in the ABA Championships for the second time in franchise history (with them first appearing in 1971); while the Colonels would fight tooth and nail with the Pacers, Indiana would ultimately prevail in seven games against their nearby rivals in Kentucky, becoming the only ABA team to ever repeat as champions while the ABA existed as a league.

This is the last ABA season where the Pacers won the championship, and as of 2025, this is the last season the Pacers won a championship of any kind in either the ABA or NBA, though 2025 was also the closest year they would get to being champions again through the 2025 NBA Finals.

== Offseason ==
=== ABA Draft ===
Weirdly enough, as of 2025, there has been no official draft records for the first five rounds of the 1972 ABA draft specifically, while every other round after that point has been properly recorded by basketball historians otherwise. Because of the strange dispersity of draft picks not being properly recorded this year after previously being fully recorded in the previous year's draft and the number of rounds potentially being off for even the players being selected this year, the recorded players selected in this year's draft will be marked with a ? for the pick number in particular (as well as certain round numbers, if necessary) in order to showcase the awkward display currently going on with the 1972 ABA draft year in particular (though what is known is that the Pacers did trade what officially became the #6 pick of the ABA draft this year to the Denver Rockets in a deal involving multiple players at hand after their unofficial #8 pick was made into an official #6 pick after the Memphis Pros and New York Nets had what would have been the official #2 and #6 picks at the time be forfeited by the ABA due to Memphis signing Larry Cannon from Denver sometime after the 1971 ABA draft and the Nets signing Jim Chones, a junior college player that was previously drafted by the Virginia Squires at the time of the previous year's draft before being considered a forfeited drafted pick from the Squires that year, sometime after the 1971 ABA draft as well). However, if any changes come up to where a proper, official recording of the 1972 ABA draft gets released displaying both pick numbers and round numbers for where certain players got selected, please provide the updated (potential) draft ordering with a source confirming the round and pick numbers included here.

Round	Pick	Player	Position(s)	Nationality	College
3(?)	24(?)	Oscar Evans	G	United States	Butler
5(?)	40(?)	Nate Stephens	C	United States	Long Beach State
6	50(?)	George Adams	SF	United States	Gardner–Webb College
7	61(?)	Richie Garner	SG	United States	Manhattan College
8	72(?)	Cavin Anderson	G	United States	Valley City State College
9	83(?)	Wardell Dyson	F	United States	Shaw University
10	94(?)	Jolly Spight	SF	United States	Santa Clara
11	105(?)	Billy Burton	G	United States	Eastern Kentucky
12	116(?)	Wally Rice	G	United States	PMC Colleges
13	127(?)	Mel Sims	G	United States	Cal State Los Angeles
14	138(?)	Nate Williams	SF	United States	Utah State

The Pacers became the only ABA team to not use the final six rounds of the 1972 ABA draft whatsoever.

==== ABA Dispersal Draft ====
Months after the original ABA draft for this year concluded, the ABA held their first ever dispersal draft on July 13, 1972, after it was found out by the ABA itself that neither "The Floridians" nor the Pittsburgh Condors would be able to continue operations either in their original locations or elsewhere in the U.S.A. (or even Canada in the case of "The Floridians"). Unlike the main draft they did during the months of March and April, this draft would last for only six rounds as a one-day deal and would have the nine remaining inaugural ABA teams selecting players that were left over at the time from both "The Floridians" and Pittsburgh Condors franchises (including draft picks from both teams there) and obtain their player rights from there. Any players from either franchise that wouldn't be selected during this draft would be placed on waivers and enter free agency afterward. Interestingly, only 42 total players were selected by the nine remaining ABA teams at the time of the dispersal draft, meaning everyone else that was available from both teams was considered a free agent to the ABA not long afterward. The Pacers would also be the last team to select players from this particular draft since they were back-to-back ABA champions. The following players were either Floridians or Condors players that the Pacers acquired during this dispersal draft.

Round	Pick	Player	Position(s)	Nationality	College	ABA Team
1	13	Dwight Davis	PF	United States	Houston	The Floridians
2	21	Dwight Jones	PF/C	United States	Houston	The Floridians
3	30	Tracy Tripucka	G	United States	Lafayette	The Floridians
4	37	Brian Adrian	G	United States	Davidson	Pittsburgh Condors

Every single selection that the Pacers would acquire in this draft would be either draft picks or be college players that "The Floridians" and Pittsburgh Condors would pick up sometime between April 12, the day the 1972 ABA draft officially concluded, and July 13, which was when the dispersal draft officially happened. Dwight Davis and Tracy Tripucka were both drafted during the 1972 ABA draft by "The Floridians" franchise, with "The Floridians" drafting them both at picks #4 and (supposedly) #102, respectively and Dwight Davis later played in the NBA instead. As for Dwight Jones and Brian Adrian, both players were apparently picked up by "The Floridians" and Pittsburgh Condors respectively sometime after the 1972 ABA draft as undrafted prospects (with Jones being picked up by "The Floridians" despite him being a junior at the time of the draft). Jones notably would have his draft pick rights stay with the Pacers for less than a month before the Pacers made sure the newly created San Diego Conquistadors ABA franchise selected Jones with a second-round pick they had on the team during the ABA's only expansion draft ever done on August 10, with Jones later playing in the NBA following the 1973 ABA draft period and the 1973 NBA draft that Jones was officially selected in as a senior.

== Roster ==
1972–73 Indiana Pacers roster
Players

Pos.	No.	Player	Height	Weight	DOB	From
SF	22	Bob Arnzen	6 ft 5 in (1.96 m)	205 lb (93 kg)	November 3, 1947	Notre Dame
SF	35	Roger Brown	6 ft 5 in (1.96 m)	205 lb (93 kg)	May 22, 1942	Dayton
PG	10	Don Buse	6 ft 4 in (1.93 m)	190 lb (86 kg)	August 10, 1950	Evansville
C	34	Mel Daniels	6 ft 9 in (2.06 m)	220 lb (100 kg)	July 20, 1944	New Mexico
SG	13	Donnie Freeman	6 ft 3 in (1.91 m)	185 lb (84 kg)	July 18, 1944	Illinois
PF	20	Darnell Hillman	6 ft 9 in (2.06 m)	215 lb (98 kg)	August 29, 1949	San José State
SF	25	Gus Johnson	6 ft 6 in (1.98 m)	230 lb (104 kg)	December 13, 1938	Idaho
SG	11	Billy Keller	5 ft 10 in (1.78 m)	177 lb (80 kg)	August 30, 1947	Purdue
PG	14	Freddie Lewis	6 ft 0 in (1.83 m)	175 lb (79 kg)	July 1, 1943	Arizona State
PF	30	George McGinnis	6 ft 8 in (2.03 m)	235 lb (107 kg)	August 12, 1950	Indiana
PF	24	Bill Newton	6 ft 9 in (2.06 m)	220 lb (100 kg)	December 22, 1950	LSU
C	15	George Peeples	6 ft 7 in (2.01 m)	190 lb (86 kg)	October 30, 1943	Iowa
C	12	Craig Raymond	6 ft 11 in (2.11 m)	235 lb (107 kg)	April 5, 1945	BYU

Coaches
Head coach
- Bobby Leonard

Legend
- (DP) Unsigned draft pick
- (FA) Free agent
- (S) Suspended
- Injured

Roster

== Regular season ==
=== ABA Schedule ===
Game	Date	Opponent	Result	Pacers points	Opponents	Record
1						
2						

=== Season standings ===
1972–73 ABA Western Standings
Western Division	W	L	PCT.	GB
Utah Stars	55	29	.655	–
Indiana Pacers	51	33	.607	4
Denver Rockets	47	37	.560	8
San Diego Conquistadors	30	54	.357	25
Dallas Chaparrals	28	56	.333	27

== Player stats ==
Legend
GP	Games played	GS	Games started	MPG	Minutes per game
FG%	Field-goal percentage	3P%	3-point field-goal percentage	FT%	Free-throw percentage
RPG	Rebounds per game	APG	Assists per game	SPG	Steals per game
BPG	Blocks per game	PPG	Points per game

=== Regular season ===
Player	GP	MPG	FG%	3P%	FT%	RPG	APG	PPG
George McGinnis	82	40.8	.495	.250	.665	12.5	2.5	27.6
Mel Daniels	81	38.3	.482	.250	.722	15.4	2.2	18.5
Freddie Lewis	72	30.8	.436	.345	.822	3.2	4.0	14.9
Darnell Hillman	84	30.3	.446	.000	.587	8.8	1.5	9.6
Roger Brown	72	30.2	.474	.356	.822	4.8	2.8	12.6
Donnie Freeman	77	28.2	.442	.333	.808	2.8	2.5	14.3
Billy Keller	83	27.1	.433	.320	.870	2.5	4.3	13.8
Don Buse	77	19.3	.453	.208	.752	2.7	2.9	5.4
Gus Johnson	50	15.1	.441	.190	.738	4.9	1.2	6.0
George Peeples	9	6.2	.286	.000	.545	1.7	0.4	1.6
Craig Raymond	6	5.5	.250	0.0	.500	1.7	0.2	0.8
Bill Newton	24	4.9	.429	.500	.500	2.0	0.4	2.4
Bob Arnzen	23	4.8	.526	.000	.750	1.0	0.1	2.0

== ABA Playoffs ==
ABA Western Division Semifinals

Game	Date	Location	Score	Record	Attendance
1	March 31	Indiana	114–91	1–0	7,051
2	April 1	Denver	106–93	2–0	7,235
3	April 3	Denver	94–105	2–1	5,335
4	April 5	Denver	97–95	3–1	6,904
5	April 7	Indiana	121–107	4–1	9,816

Pacers win series, 4–1

ABA Western Division Finals

Game	Date	Location	Score	Record	Attendance
1	April 12	Utah	107–124	0–1	7,712
2	April 14	Utah	116–110	1–1	12,233
3	April 16	Indiana	118–108	2–1	9,353
4	April 18	Indiana	103–104	2–2	10,079
5	April 19	Utah	104–102	3–2	12,453
6	April 21	Indiana	107–98	4–2	9,529

Pacers win series, 4–2

ABA Finals

Game	Date	Location	Score	Record	Attendance
1	April 28	Kentucky	111–107 (OT)	1–0	12,119
2	April 30	Kentucky	102–114	1–1	13,408
3	May 3	Indiana	88–92	1–2	10,079
4	May 5	Indiana	90–86	2–2	9,498
5	May 8	Kentucky	89–86	3–2	16,779
6	May 10	Indiana	93–109	3–3	10,079
7	May 12	Kentucky	88–81	4–3	16,597

Pacers win championship series, 4–3

== Awards, records, and honors ==
- George McGinnis, appeared in the 1973 ABA All-Star Game
- Mel Daniels, appeared in the 1973 ABA All-Star Game
