= ABA Playoffs Most Valuable Player Award =

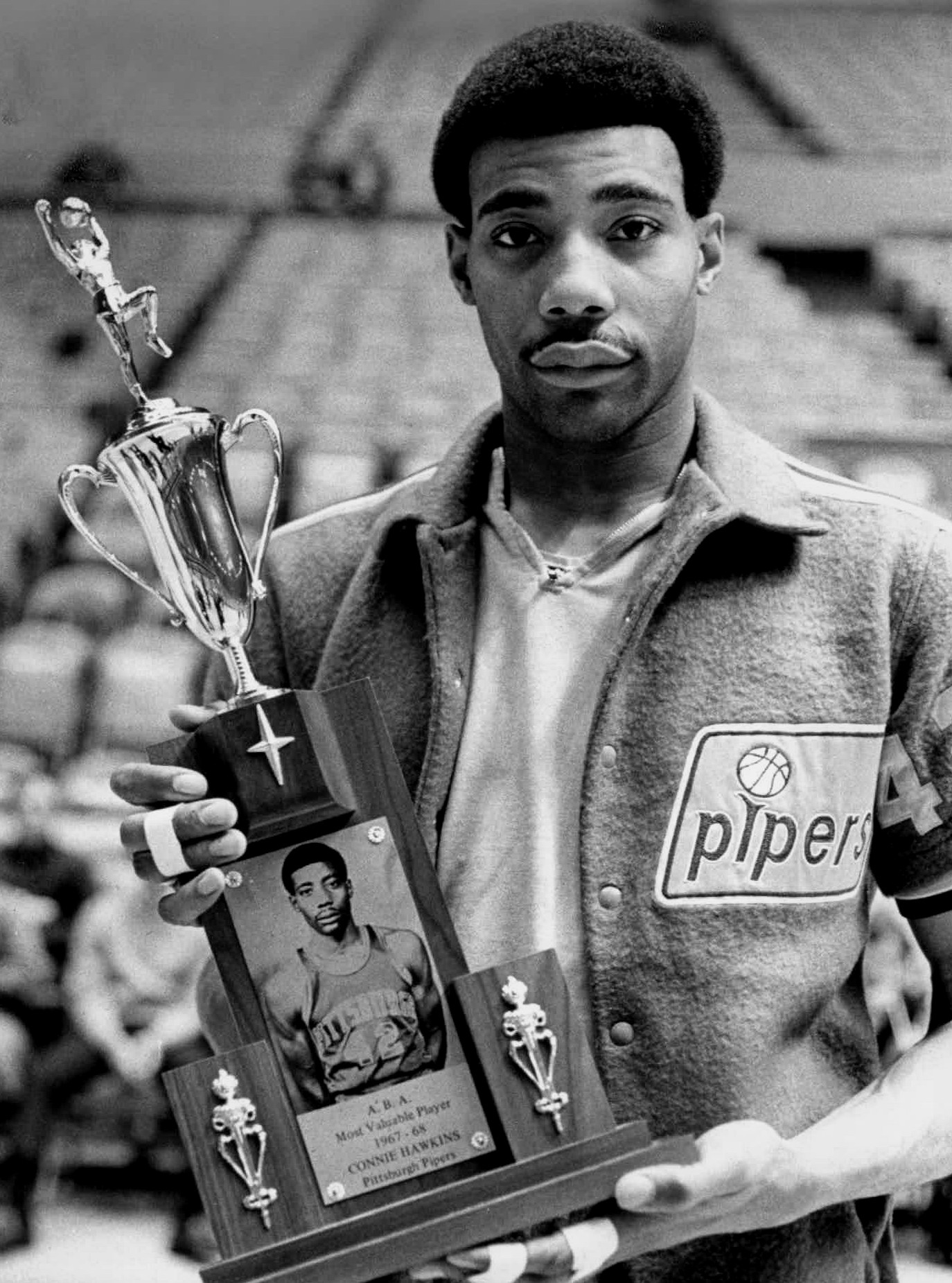
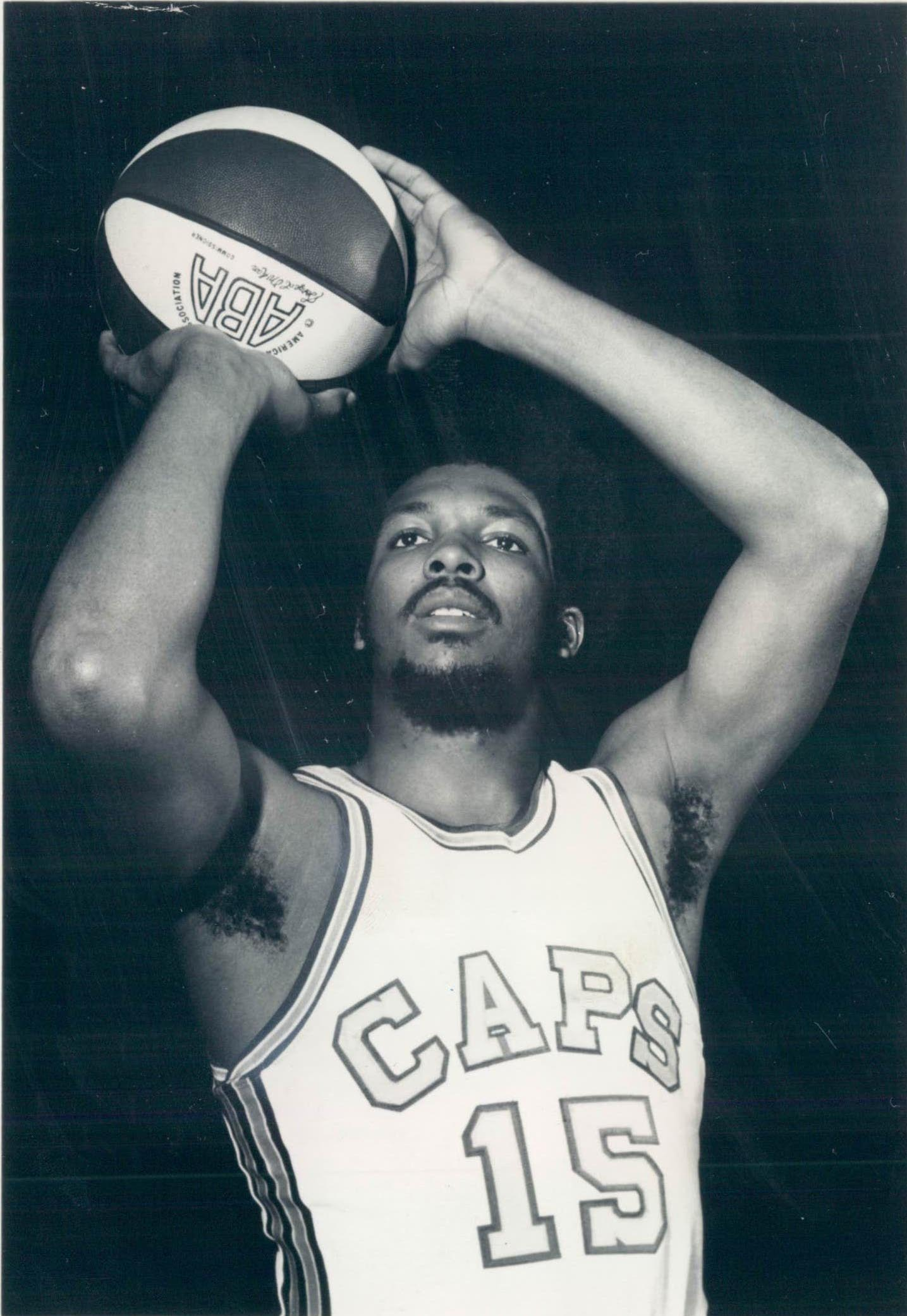
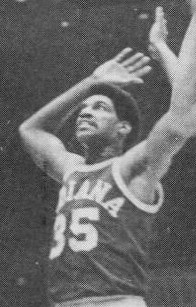
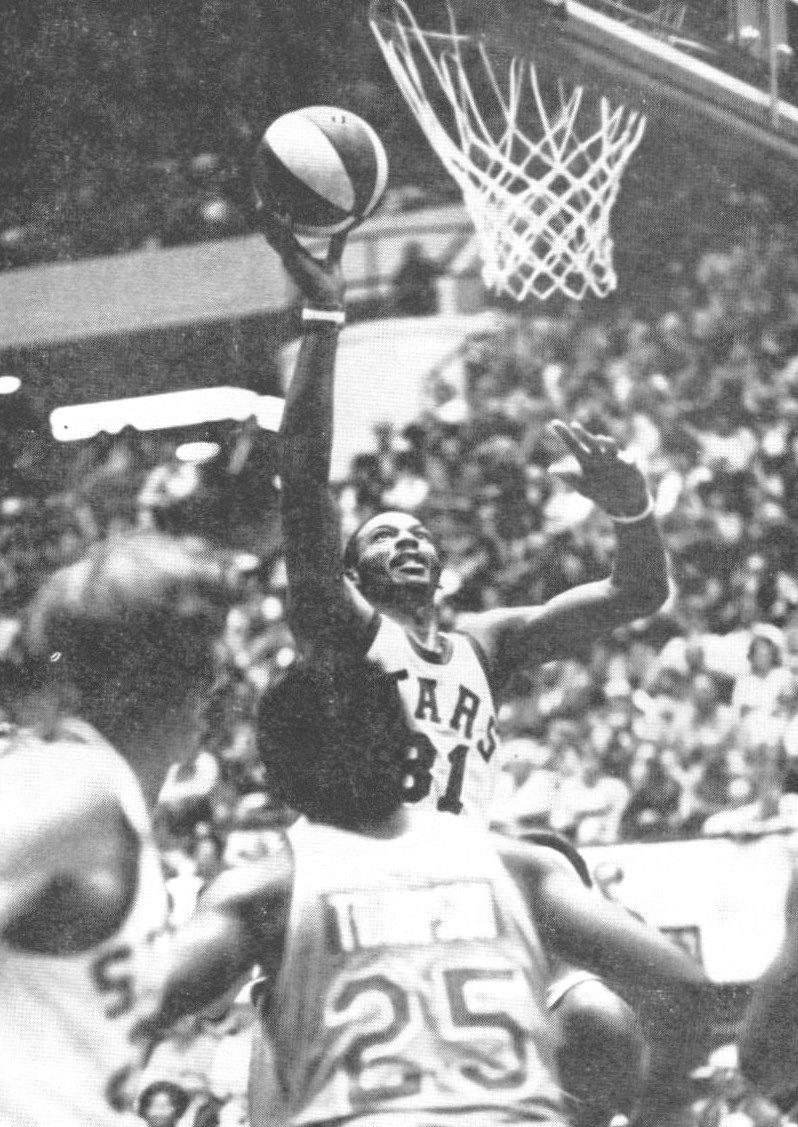
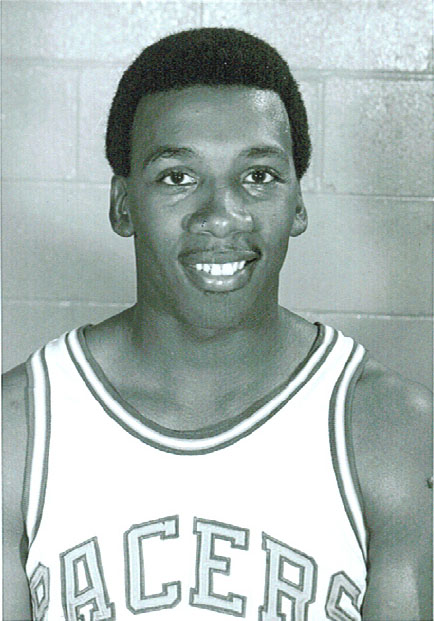
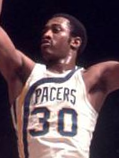
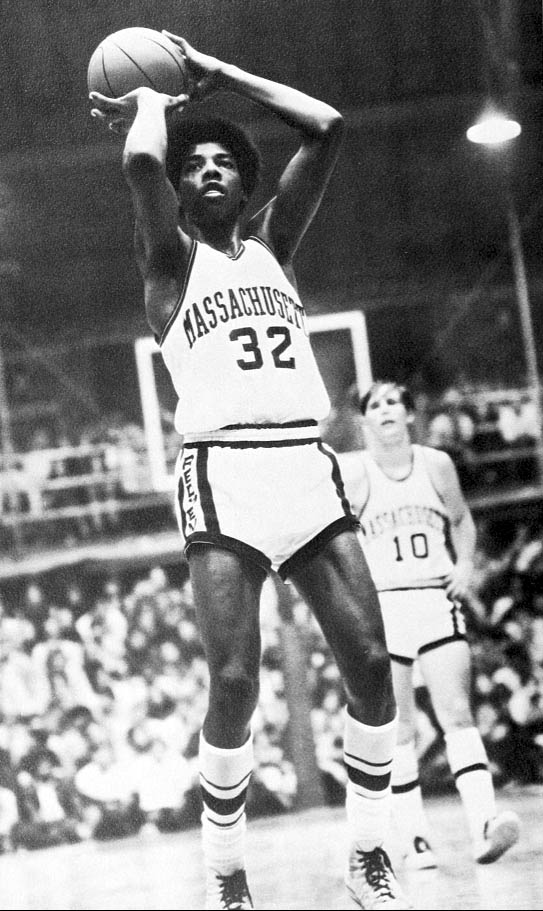
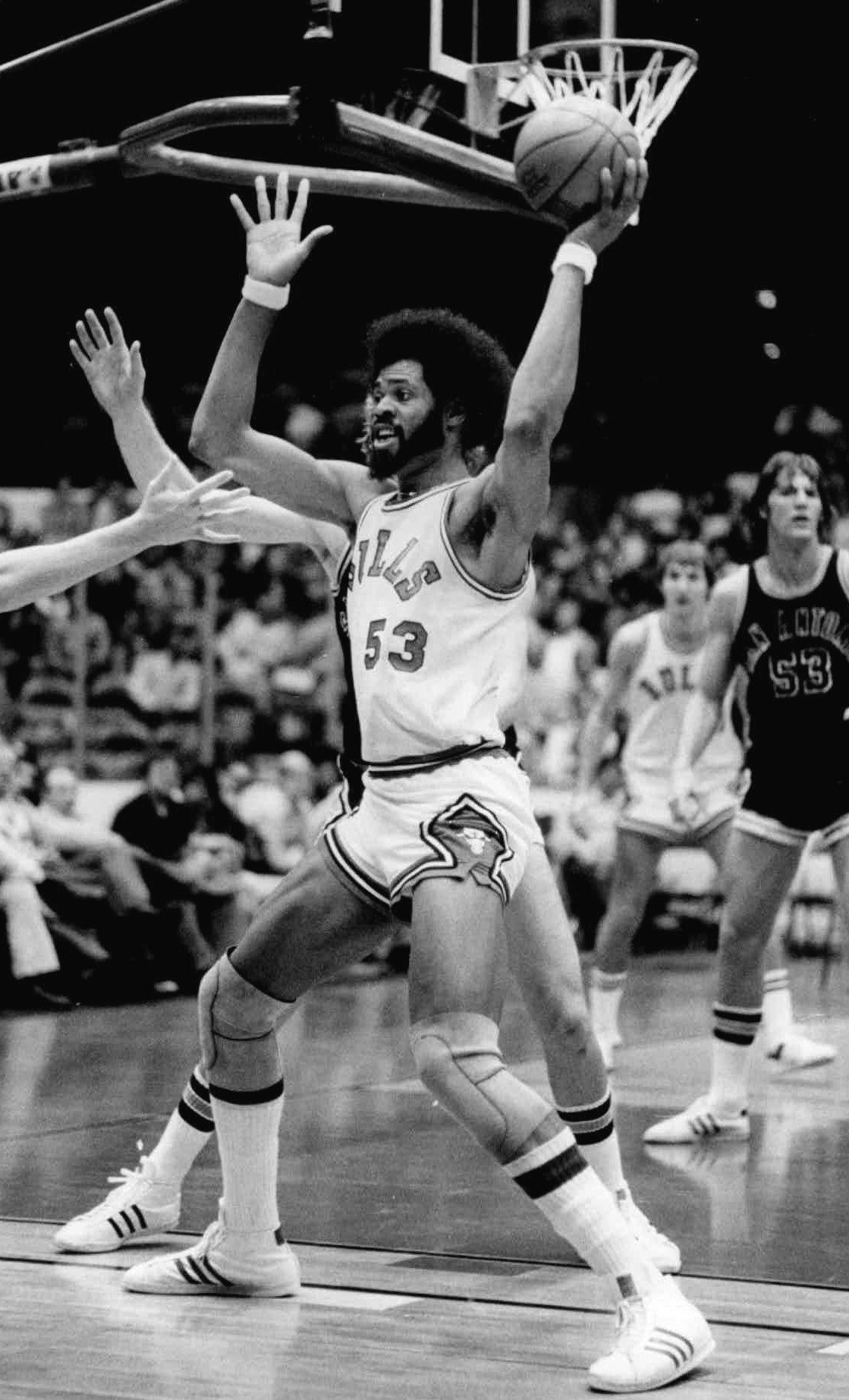
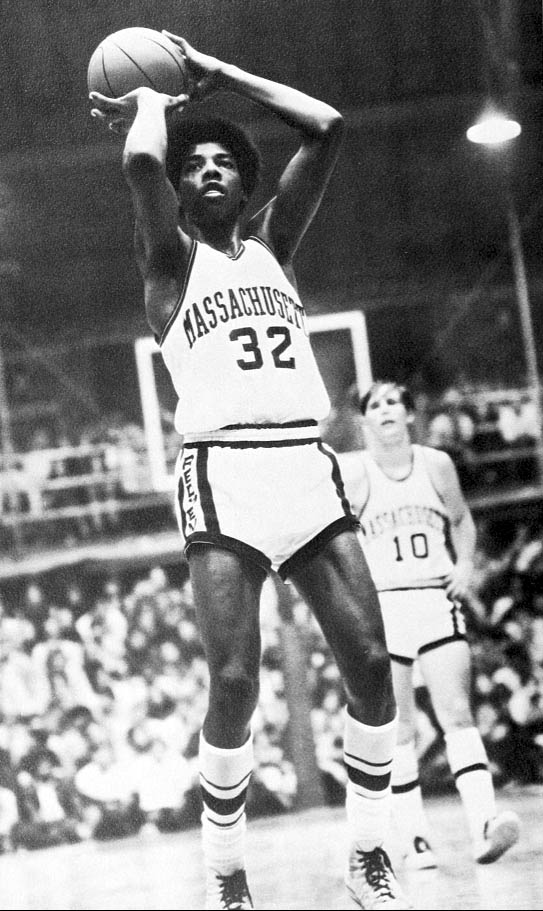

The ABA Playoffs Most Valuable Player Award was an annual American Basketball Association (ABA) given in the ABA Playoffs. The award was first awarded in the 1968 ABA Playoffs and was retired as part of the ABA–NBA merger. In sports, the player judged to be the most important to the team is the most valuable player (MVP).

The inaugural award winner was Pittsburgh Pipers' player Connie Hawkins. On all occasions, the player who won the Playoffs MVP award was from the team that won the ABA championship. Julius Erving, who led the New York Nets to two ABA championships in 1974 and 1976, was the only player to win the award twice.

== Winners ==
*	Elected to the Naismith Memorial Basketball Hall of Fame
Player (X)	Denotes the number of times the player has received the Playoffs MVP award

Year	Player	Positions	Team	Note
1968	Connie Hawkins*	Forward/center	Pittsburgh Pipers	
1969	Warren Jabali	Guard/forward	Oakland Oaks	
1970	Roger Brown*	Forward/guard	Indiana Pacers	
1971	Zelmo Beaty*	Center	Utah Stars	
1972	Freddie Lewis	Guard	Indiana Pacers	
1973	George McGinnis*	Forward/center	Indiana Pacers	
1974	Julius Erving*	Forward	New York Nets	
1975	Artis Gilmore*	Center	Kentucky Colonels	
1976	Julius Erving* (2)	Forward	New York Nets	

== Playoffs Most Valuable Player gallery ==
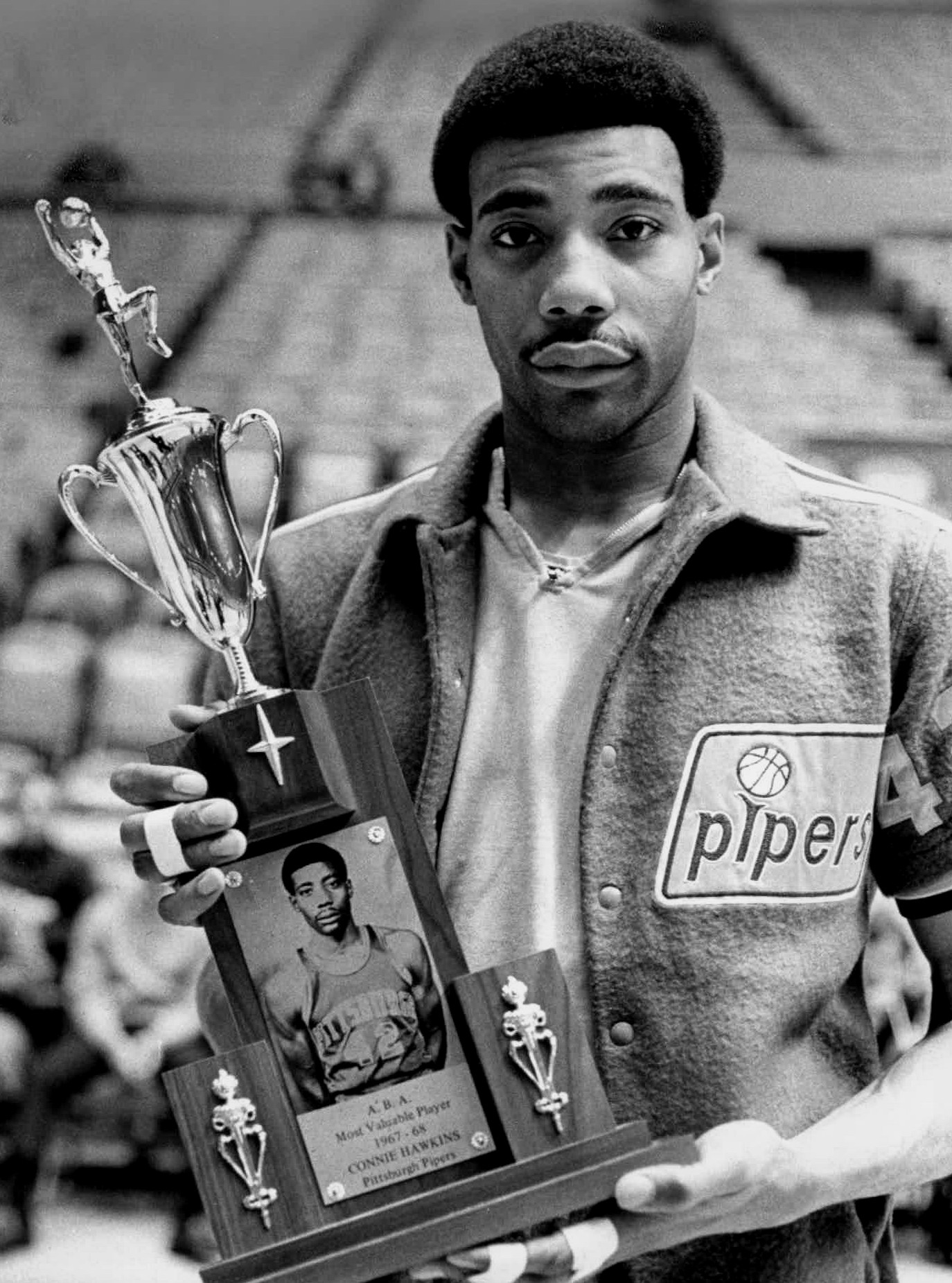
Connie Hawkins (1968)

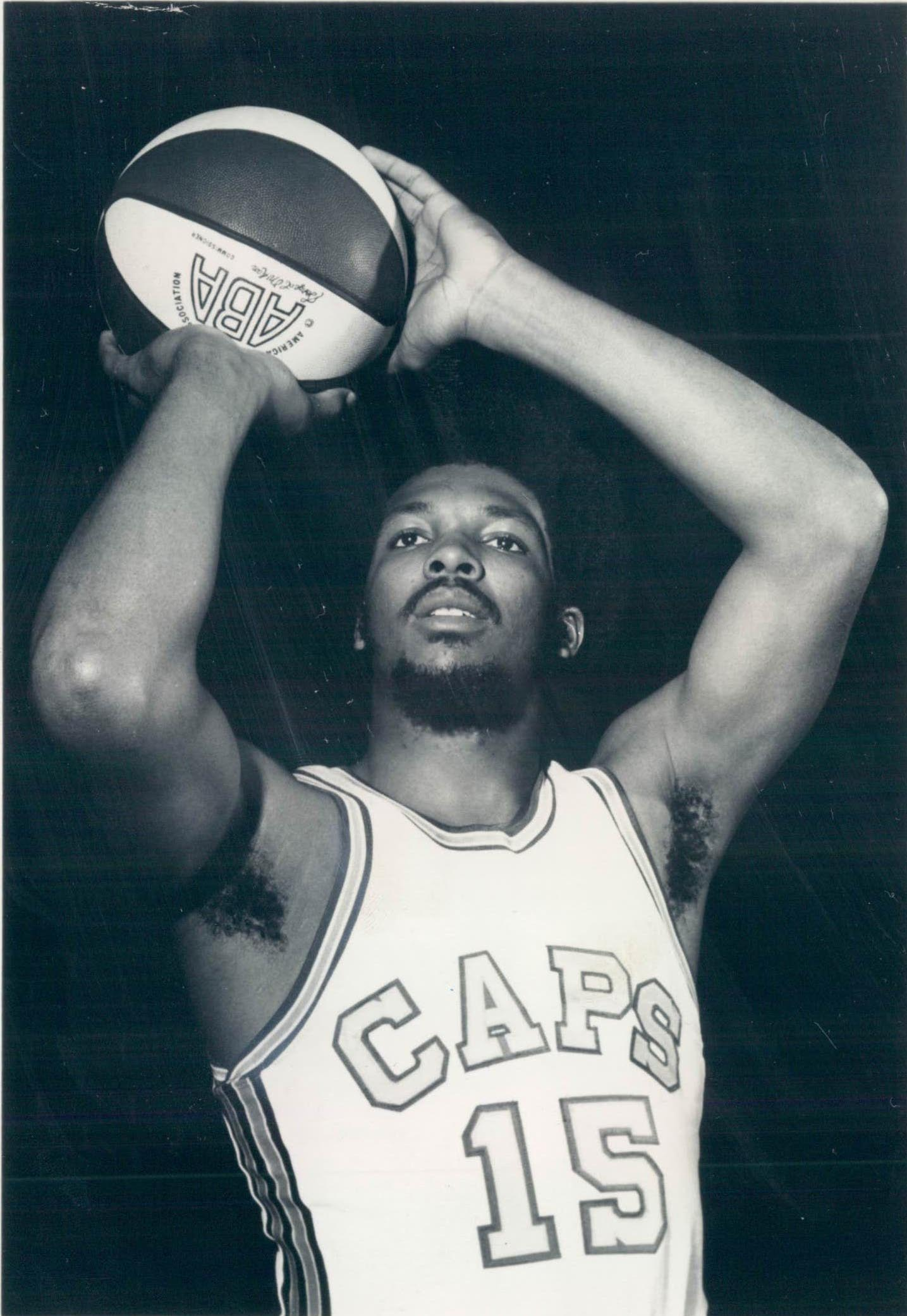
Warren Jabali (1969)

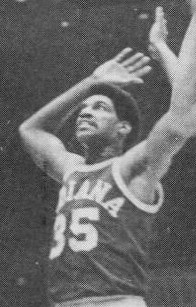
Roger Brown (1970)

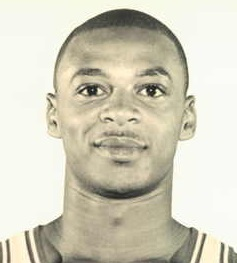
Zelmo Beaty (1971)

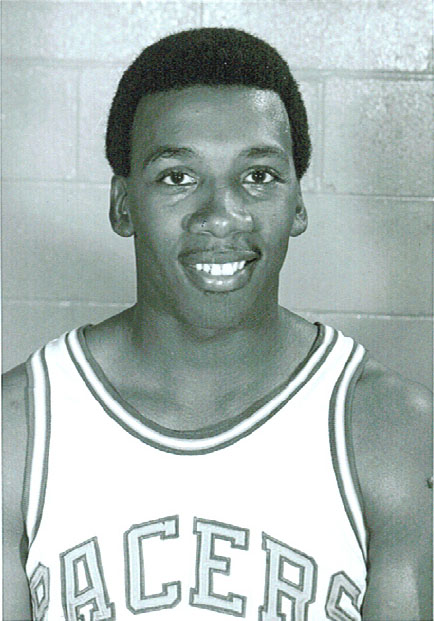
Freddie Lewis (1972)

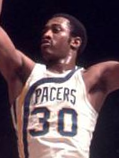
George McGinnis (1973)

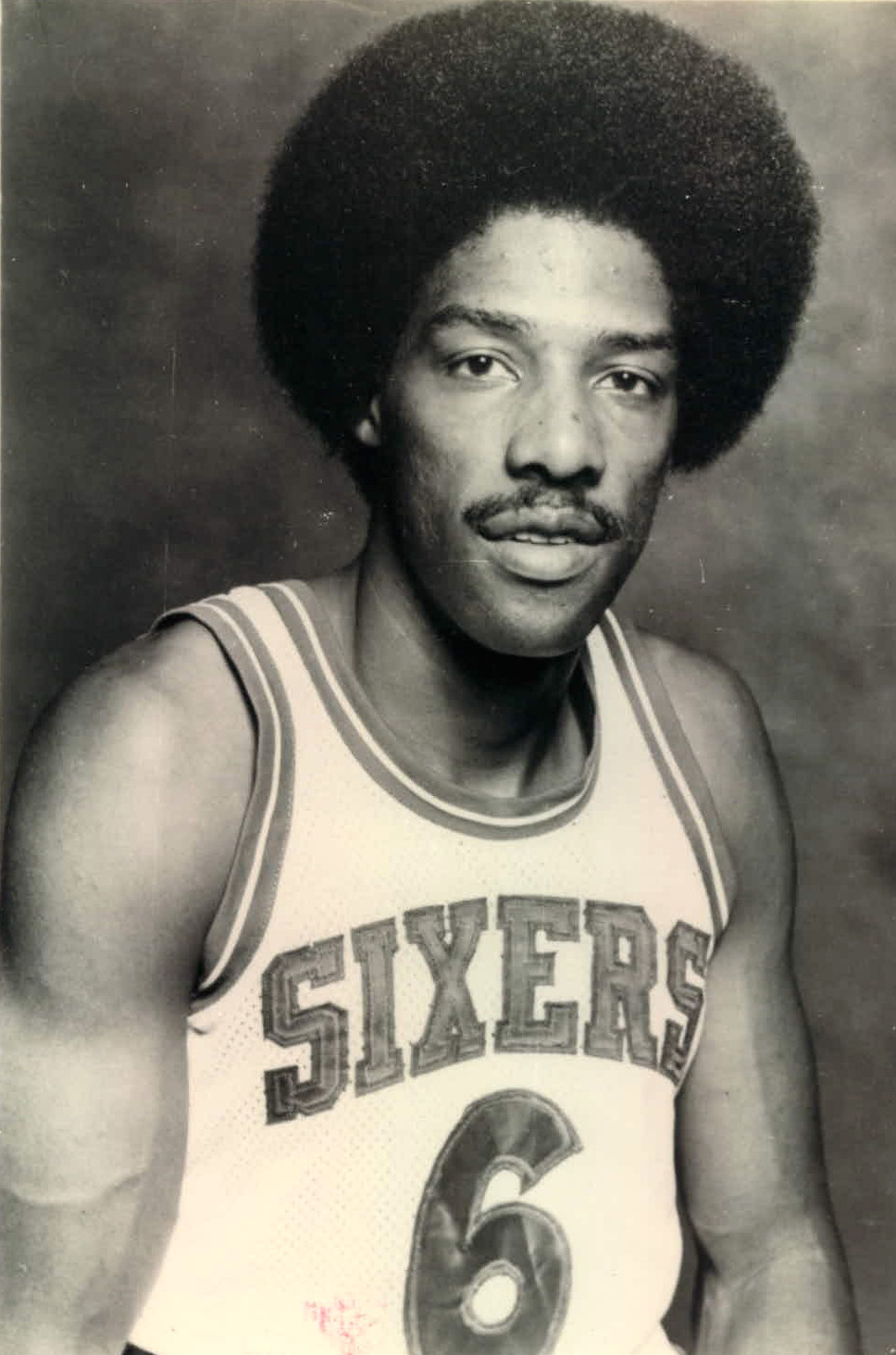
Julius Erving (1974)

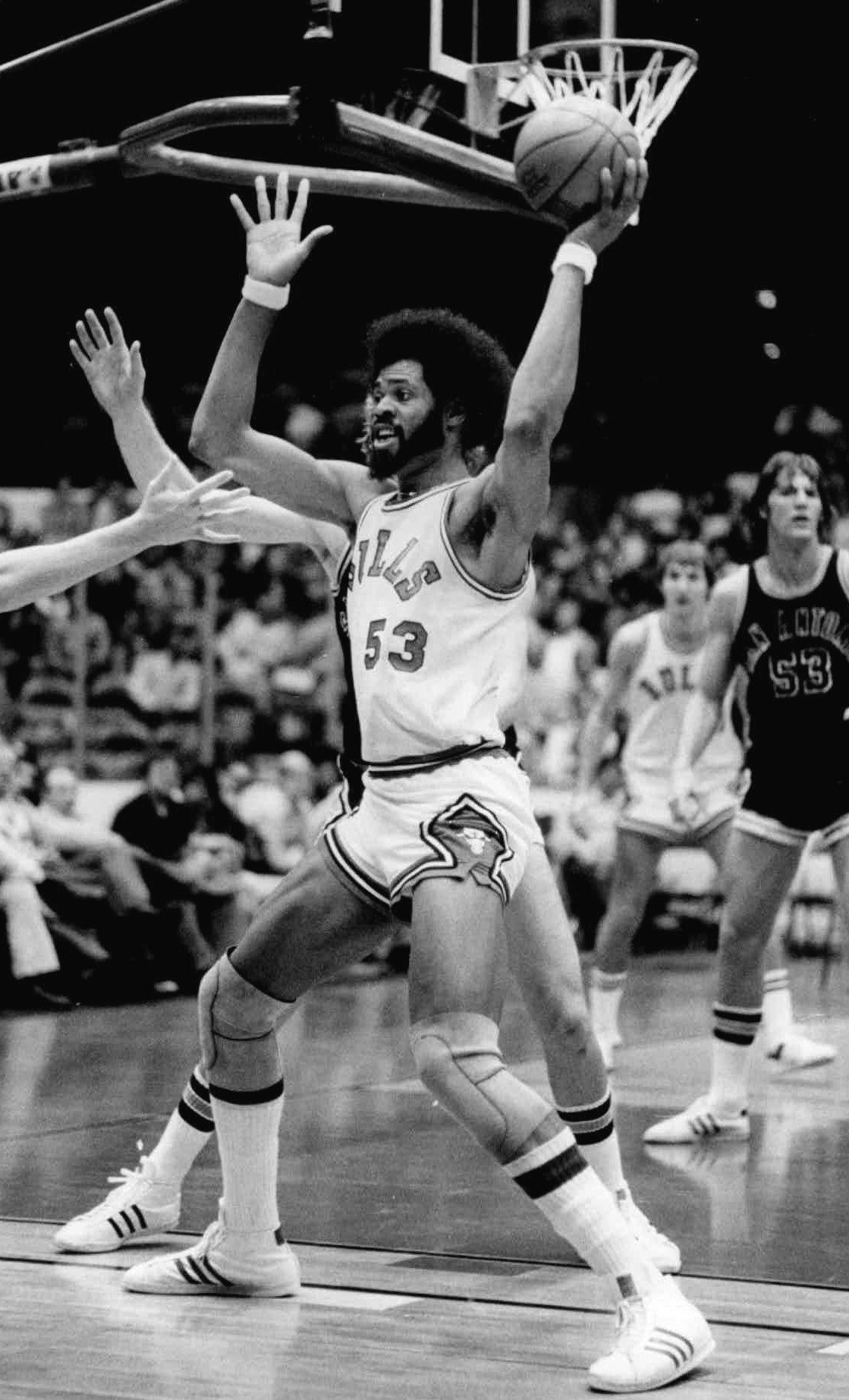
Artis Gilmore (1975)

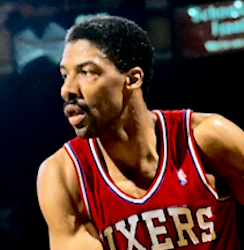
Julius Erving (1976)
