= ABA Most Valuable Player Award =

In the American Basketball Association

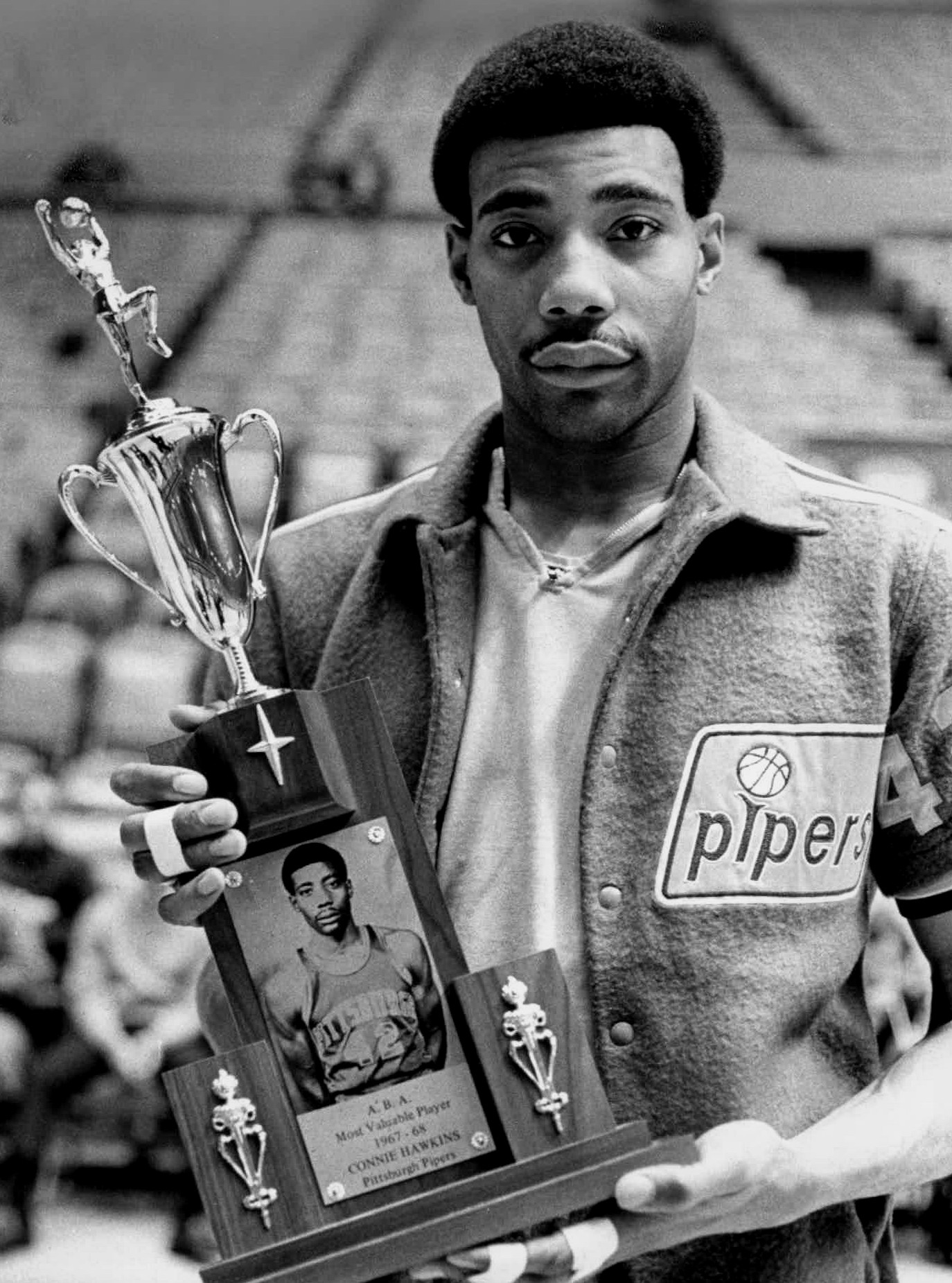
Connie Hawkins holding the 1968 ABA MVP Trophy

The Most Valuable Player (MVP) was an annual award first awarded in the 1967–68 season. Every player who has won the award has played for a team with at least 45 regular-season wins. The inaugural award winner was Hall of Famer Connie Hawkins. Hall of Famer Julius Erving won the award three times, all with the New York Nets. Mel Daniels won it twice with the Indiana Pacers. Erving and George McGinnis were joint winners in the 1974–75 season.

Two rookies won the award: Spencer Haywood in the 1969–70 season and Artis Gilmore in the 1971–72 season. All are in the Naismith Basketball Hall of Fame.

Season	Player	Position	Team	Playoff Finish
1967–68	Connie Hawkins*	Forward/center	Pittsburgh Pipers	Won 1968 ABA Finals
1968–69	Mel Daniels*	Center	Indiana Pacers	Lost in ABA Finals
1969–70	Spencer Haywood*	Forward/center	Denver Rockets	Lost in Division finals
1970–71	Mel Daniels* (2)	Center	Indiana Pacers	Lost in Division finals
1971–72	Artis Gilmore*	Center	Kentucky Colonels	Lost in Division semifinals
1972–73	Billy Cunningham*	Guard/forward	Carolina Cougars	Lost in Division finals
1973–74	Julius Erving*	Forward	New York Nets	Won ABA Finals
1974–75	Julius Erving* (2)	Forward	New York Nets	Lost in Division semifinals
1974–75	George McGinnis*	Forward/center	Indiana Pacers	Lost in ABA Finals
1975–76	Julius Erving* (3)	Forward	New York Nets	Won ABA Finals

Erving and McGinnis both won the award for the 1974–75 season.

Daniels and Erving were the only multiple time winners.

Erving is the only player to also win the NBA Most Valuable Player Award.

== ABA Most Valuable Player ==
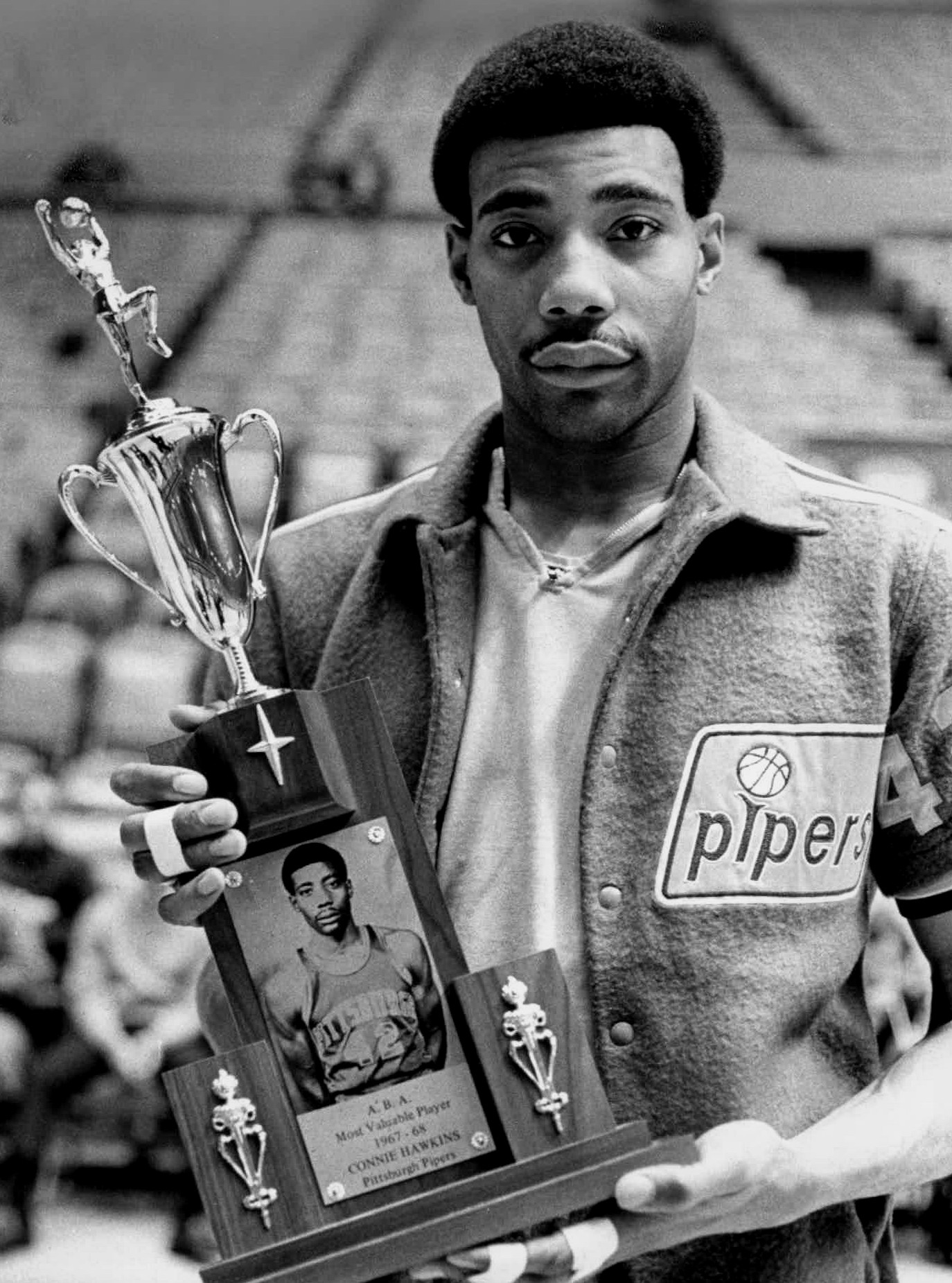
Connie Hawkins (1968.)

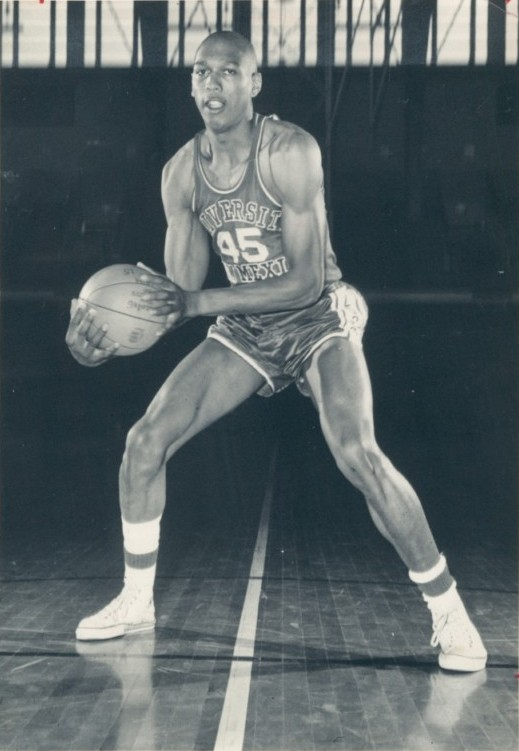
Mel Daniels (1969.)

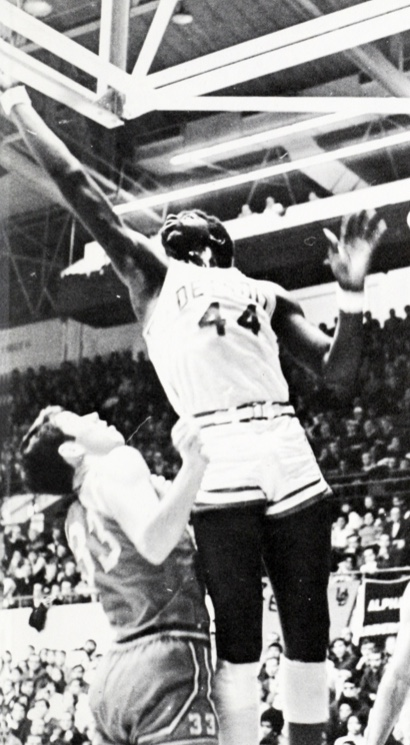
Spencer Haywood (1970)

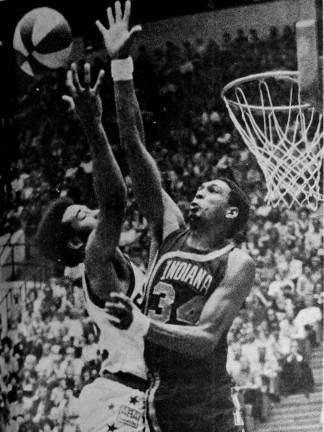
Mel Daniels (1971.)

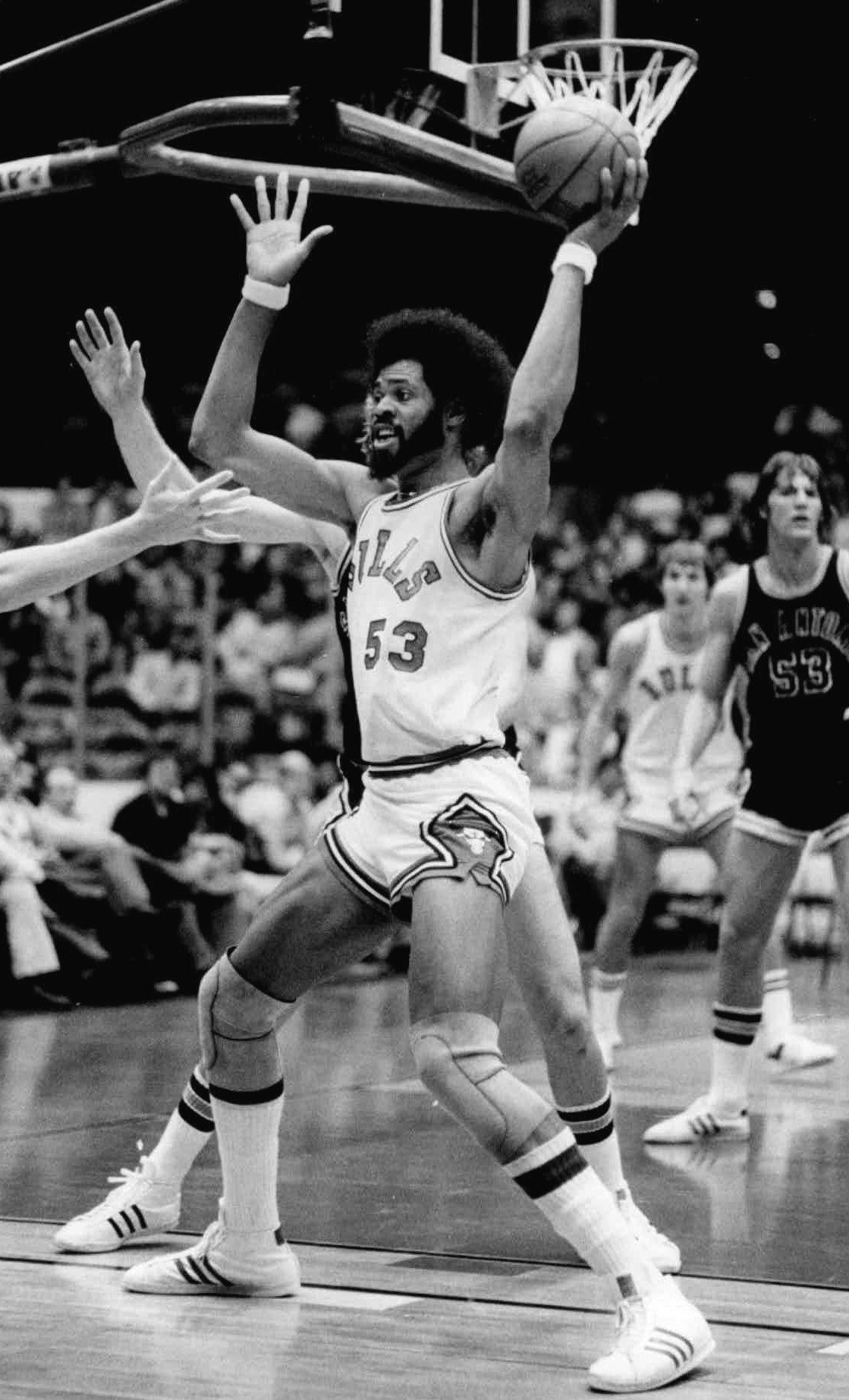
Artis Gilmore (1972)

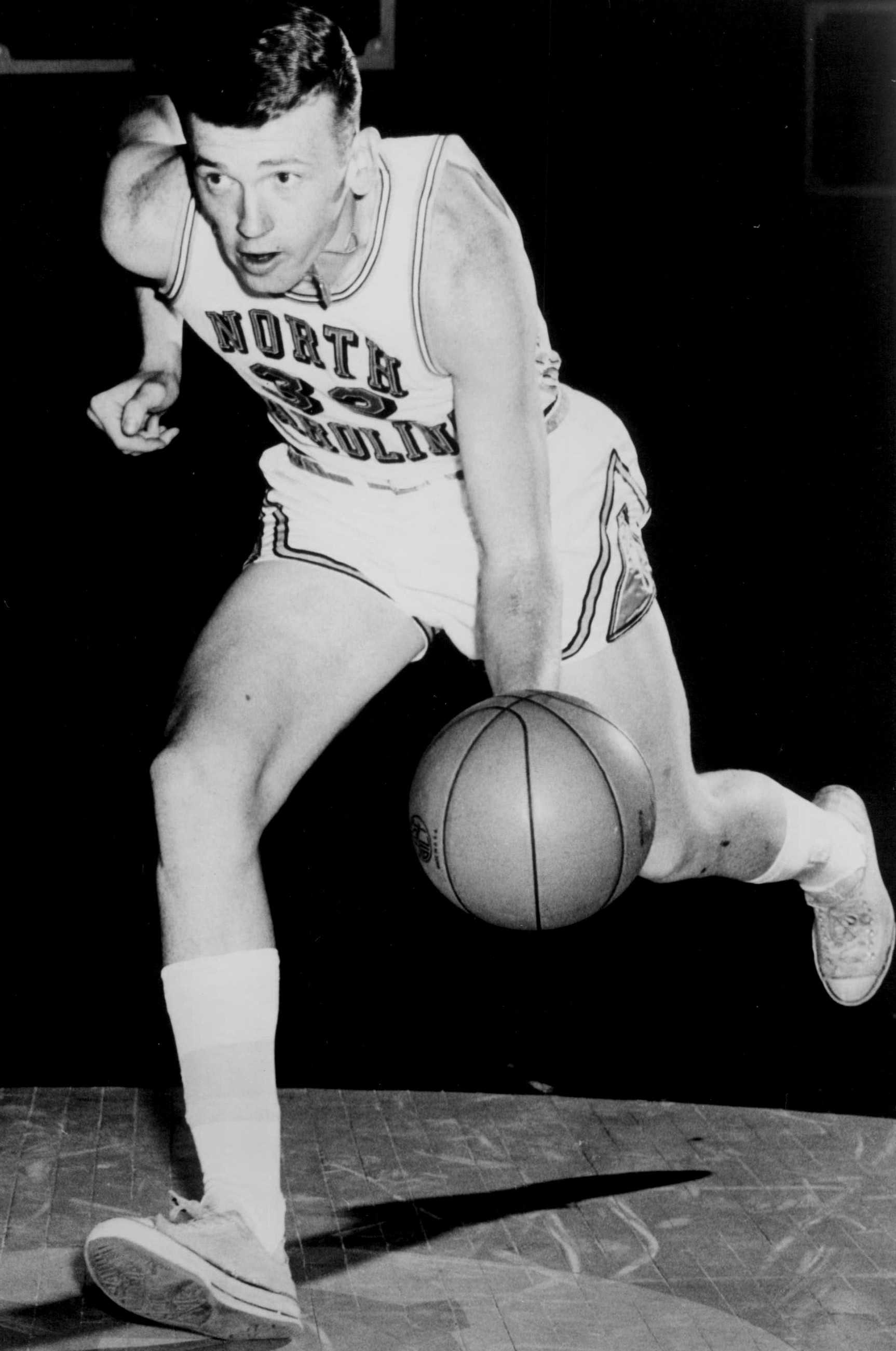
Billy Cunninghamn (1973)

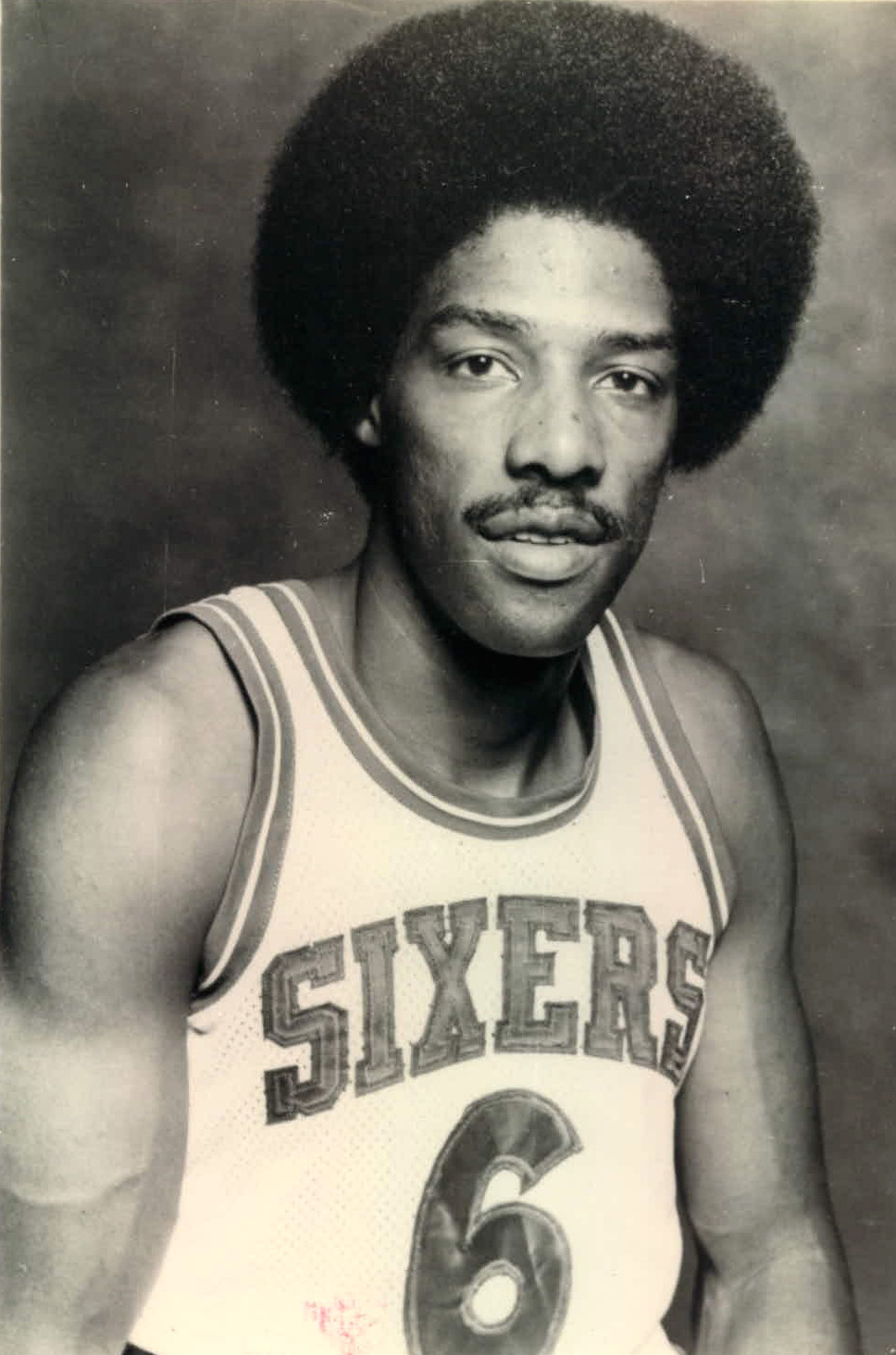
Julius Erving (1974.)

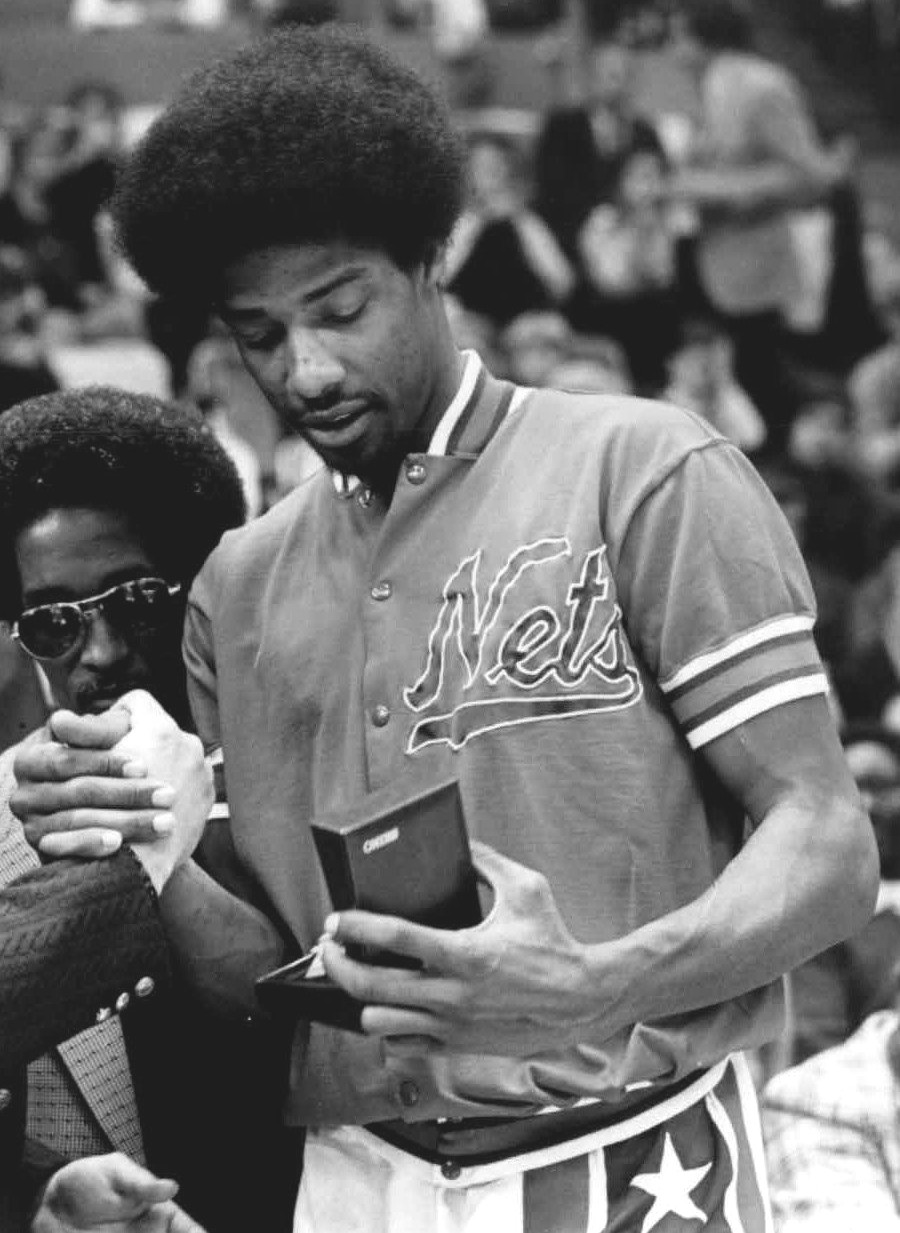
Julius Erving (1975.)

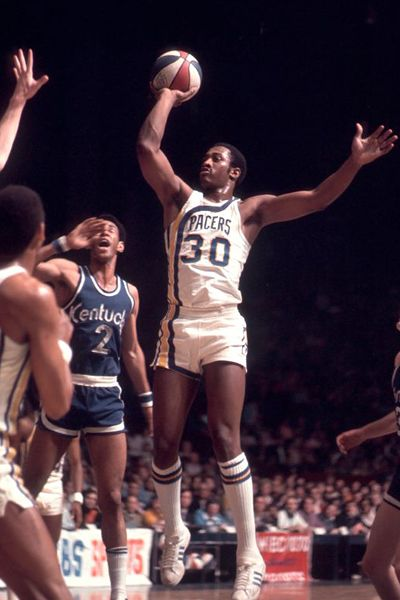
George McGinnis (1975.)

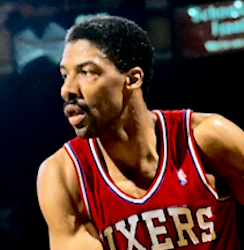
Julius Erving (1976.)
