= 1968–69 Miami Floridians season =

- Head coach: Jim Pollard
- Arena: Miami Beach Convention Center; Convention Center Annex

Results
- Record: 43–35 (.551)
- Place: Division: 2nd (Eastern)
- Playoff finish: Lost in the Eastern Division Finals
- Radio: WOCN

The 1968–69 Miami Floridians season was the first season of the Floridians franchise in the American Basketball Association and second overall season of existence. The team had moved from the state of Minnesota after one season played as the Minnesota Muskies. One aspect for the Miami Floridians struggling to acquire a good fanbase related to them trading away their star player, Mel Daniels, to the Indiana Pacers back when they were still going by the Muskies in the 1968 ABA draft. Despite them trading away their star player to Indiana, the Miami Floridians finished one game behind the Pacers, for a second-place finish. In the 1969 ABA Playoffs, they faced the replacement for them in the state of Minnesota, the defending champion Pipers. They beat them in a close 7-game series to set up a chance to go to the ABA Finals. However, in the Eastern Division Finals, they lost to the Indiana Pacers 4 games to 1.

== Roster ==
1968–69 Miami Floridians roster
Players

Pos.	No.	Player	Height	Weight	DOB	From
SG	23	Andrew Anderson	6 ft 2 in (1.88 m)	184 lb (83 kg)	July 6, 1945	Canisius
SG	20	Donnie Freeman	6 ft 3 in (1.91 m)	185 lb (84 kg)	July 18, 1944	Illinois
PF	41	Les Hunter	6 ft 7 in (2.01 m)	210 lb (95 kg)	August 16, 1942	Loyola Chicago
SG	24	Ervin Inniger	6 ft 4 in (1.93 m)	190 lb (86 kg)	January 16, 1945	Indiana
PG	21	Willie Iverson	6 ft 0 in (1.83 m)	180 lb (82 kg)	October 8, 1945	Central Michigan
G	23	Nick Jones	6 ft 2 in (1.88 m)	190 lb (86 kg)	March 28, 1945	Oregon
C	42	Gary Keller	6 ft 9 in (2.06 m)	220 lb (100 kg)	June 13, 1944	Florida
PG	22	Maurice McHartley	6 ft 3 in (1.91 m)	185 lb (84 kg)	August 1, 1942	North Carolina A&T
SF	44	Willie Murrell	6 ft 6 in (1.98 m)	225 lb (102 kg)	September 13, 1941	Kansas State
PG	22	Ron Perry	6 ft 3 in (1.91 m)	190 lb (86 kg)	December 29, 1943	Virginia Tech
PF	33	Don Sidle	6 ft 8 in (2.03 m)	215 lb (98 kg)	June 21, 1946	Oklahoma
PF	32	Dan Sparks	6 ft 8 in (2.03 m)	200 lb (91 kg)	April 17, 1945	Weber State
C	43	Skip Thoren	6 ft 10 in (2.08 m)	230 lb (104 kg)	April 5, 1943	Illinois
SF	34	Dallas Thornton	6 ft 4 in (1.93 m)	190 lb (86 kg)	September 1, 1946	Kentucky Wesleyan

Coaches
Head coach
- Jim Pollard

Legend
- (DP) Unsigned draft pick
- (FA) Free agent
- (S) Suspended
- Injured

Roster

== Final standings ==
=== Eastern Division ===
Team	W	L	PCT.	GB
Indiana Pacers	44	34	.564	-
Miami Floridians	43	35	.551	1
Kentucky Colonels	42	36	.538	2
Minnesota Pipers	36	42	.462	8
New York Nets	17	61	.218	27

== ABA Playoffs ==
ABA Eastern Division Semifinals vs. Minnesota Pipers

Game	Date	Location	Score	Record	Attendance
1	April 7	Miami	119–110	1–0	4,103
2	April 9	West Palm Beach	99–106	1–1	1,688
3	April 10	Minnesota	93–109	1–2	1,520
4	April 12	Minnesota	116–109	2–2	2,532
5	April 13	Miami	122–107	3–2	4,206
6	April 15	Minnesota	100–105	3–3	1,345
7	April 19	Miami	137–128	4–3	5,702

Floridians win series, 4–3

ABA Eastern Division Finals vs Indiana Pacers

Game	Date	Location	Result	Record	Attendance
1	April 20	Indiana	110–126	0–1	8,721
2	April 22	Indiana	116–131	0–2	7,243
3	April 23	Miami	105–119	0–3	2,112
4	April 25	Miami	114–110	1–3	2,846
4	April 26	Indiana	105–127	1–4	3,528

Floridians lose series, 4–1

== Awards and honors ==
1969 ABA All-Star Game selections (game played on January 28, 1969)

- Donnie Freeman
- Les Hunter
- Skip Thoren
