= 1969 ABA playoffs =

Basketball competition

Tournament details
- Dates: April 5 – May 7, 1969
- Season: 1968–69
- Teams: 8

Final positions
- Champions: Oakland Oaks (1st title)
- Runners-up: Indiana Pacers
- Semifinalists: Miami Floridians; New Orleans Buccaneers

The 1969 ABA playoffs was the postseason tournament of the American Basketball Association's 1968–69 season. The tournament concluded with the Western Division champion Oakland Oaks defeating the Eastern Division champion Indiana Pacers, four games to one in the ABA Finals. Warren Jabali of the Oaks was named the Playoff MVP.

== Notable events ==
The Oakland Oaks won the ABA championship after finishing with the league's best record during the regular season (60–18, .769). The Pittsburgh Pipers had accomplished the same feat the year prior.

Rick Barry, now eligible to play for the Oaks after being forced to sit out the previous season, averaged 34.0 points during the regular season. However, Barry only played 35 regular season games before injuring a knee and missing the playoffs.

The Oaks, like the Pittsburgh Pipers before them, did not play in the following season as the same team. The Oakland Oaks became the Washington Caps for the 1969–1970 ABA season; the Pittsburgh Pipers had become the Minnesota Pipers after winning the ABA championship the prior season.

The Oaks' 60–18 (.769) record in this season was the best in ABA history until the Kentucky Colonels finished the 1971–1972 season with a record of 68–16 (.810), a record that was never surpassed.

Warren Jabali of Oakland was the Most Valuable Player of the ABA playoffs.

== Bracket ==
Division Semifinals
1	Oakland Oaks	4
3	Denver Rockets	3
Western Division
4	Dallas Chaparrals	3
2	New Orleans Buccaneers	4
1	Indiana Pacers	4
3	Kentucky Colonels	3
Eastern Division
4	Minnesota Pipers	3
2	Miami Floridians	4

Division Finals
1	Oakland Oaks	4
2	New Orleans Bucs	0
1	Indiana Pacers	4
2	Miami Floridians	1

ABA Finals
W1	Oakland Oaks	4
E1	Indiana Pacers	1

== Division Semifinals ==
=== Division Semifinals ===
==== (1) Oakland Oaks vs. (3) Denver Rockets ====
April 5

Box score

Denver Rockets 99, Oakland Oaks 129
Scoring by quarter: 22–30, 35–36, 21–30, 21–33
Pts: Wayne Hightower 23; Rebs: Ken Wilburn 12; Asts: Beck, Jones 4 each	Pts: Warren Jabali 28; Rebs: Ira Harge 17; Asts: Jabali, Moe, Critchfield 4 each
Oakland leads series, 1–0

Oakland–Alameda County Coliseum Arena, Oakland, California
Attendance: 2,358

April 6

Box score

Denver Rockets 122, Oakland Oaks 119
Scoring by quarter: 31–26, 24–32, 41–22, 26–39
Pts: Larry Jones 31; Rebs: Byron Beck 17; Asts: Jeff Congdon 10	Pts: Warren Jabali 33; Rebs: Ira Harge 15; Asts: Brown, Logan 5 each
Series tied, 1–1

Oakland–Alameda County Coliseum Arena, Oakland, California
Attendance: 1,580

April 8

Box score

Oakland Oaks 121, Denver Rockets 99
Scoring by quarter: 33–31, 38–16, 22–28, 28–24
Pts: Warren Jabali 42; Rebs: Warren Jabali 15; Asts: Larry Brown 4	Pts: Larry Jones 28; Rebs: Jones, Piatkowski 8 each Asts: Jeff Congdon 5
Oakland leads series, 2–1

Denver Auditorium Arena, Denver, Colorado
Attendance: 5,062

April 10

Box score

Oakland Oaks 108, Denver Rockets 109
Scoring by quarter: 26–22, 28–30, 23–34, 31–23
Pts: Warren Jabali 24; Rebs: Gary Bradds 16; Asts: Larry Brown 6	Pts: Lonnie Wright 23; Rebs: Julian Hammond 10; Asts: Larry Jones 8
Series tied, 2–2

Denver Auditorium Arena, Denver, Colorado
Attendance: 5,431

April 12

Box score

Denver Rockets 118, Oakland Oaks 128
Scoring by quarter: 25–34, 26–33, 31–34, 36–27
Pts: Byron Beck 21; Rebs: Byron Beck 14; Asts: Larry Jones 5	Pts: Warren Jabali 34; Rebs: Warren Jabali 14; Asts: Moe, Brown, Logan 3 each
Oakland leads series, 3–2

Oakland–Alameda County Coliseum Arena, Oakland, California
Attendance: 3,156

April 13

Box score

Oakland Oaks 115, Denver Rockets 126
Scoring by quarter: 16–32, 32–35, 31–30, 36–29
Pts: Warren Jabali 20; Rebs: Ira Harge 12; Asts: Larry Brown 5	Pts: Larry Jones 33; Rebs: Wright, Jones 11 each Asts: Jones, Hightower, Congdon 4 each
Series tied, 3–3

Denver Auditorium Arena, Denver, Colorado
Attendance: 6,841

April 16

Box score

Denver Rockets 102, Oakland Oaks 115
Scoring by quarter: 27–35, 29–24, 19–20, 27–36
Pts: Wayne Hightower 23; Rebs: Wayne Hightower 14; Asts: Jeff Congdon 9	Pts: Doug Moe 28; Rebs: Ira Harge 16; Asts: Larry Brown 6
Oakland wins series, 4–3

Oakland–Alameda County Coliseum Arena, Oakland, California
Attendance: 5,123

==== (2) New Orleans Buccaneers vs. (4) Dallas Chaparrals ====
April 5

Box score

Dallas Chaparrals 106, New Orleans Buccaneers 129
Scoring by quarter: 20–38, 25–30, 25–22, 36–39
Pts: Glen Combs 21; Rebs: Manny Leaks 9	Pts: Jimmy Jones 22; Rebs: Red Robbins 14
New Orleans leads series, 1–0

Loyola Field House, New Orleans, Louisiana
Attendance: 3,765

April 7

Box score

Dallas Chaparrals 108, New Orleans Buccaneers 122
Scoring by quarter: 23–34, 32–35, 24–20, 29–33
Pts: Glen Combs 24; Rebs: Bedell, Leaks, Beasley 8 each	Pts: Jimmy Jones 45; Rebs: Red Robbins 18
New Orleans leads series, 2–0

Loyola Field House, New Orleans, Louisiana
Attendance: 3,525

April 10

Box score

New Orleans Buccaneers 106, Dallas Chaparrals 130
Scoring by quarter: 20–31, 26–27, 28–39, 32–33
Pts: Red Robbins 29; Rebs: Red Robbins 14	Pts: Cincy Powell 26; Rebs: John Beasley 14
New Orleans leads series, 2–1

Moody Coliseum, University Park, Texas
Attendance: 2,887

April 12

Box score

New Orleans Buccaneers 114, Dallas Chaparrals 107
Scoring by quarter: 25–28, 31–35, 31–21, 27–23
Pts: Jimmy Jones 29; Rebs: Red Robbins 13	Pts: Beasley, Powell 20 each Rebs: Manny Leaks 12
New Orleans leads series, 3–1

Moody Coliseum, University Park, Texas
Attendance: 5,482

April 14

Box score

Dallas Chaparrals 123, New Orleans Buccaneers 112
Scoring by quarter: 34–32, 34–21, 34–35, 21–24
Pts: Cincy Powell 31; Rebs: Cincy Powell 18	Pts: Jimmy Jones 37; Rebs: Robbins, Govan 12 each
New Orleans leads series, 3–2

Loyola Field House, New Orleans, Louisiana
Attendance: 4,517

April 15

Box score

New Orleans Buccaneers 118, Dallas Chaparrals 136
Scoring by quarter: 26–27, 17–34, 34–35, 41–40
Pts: Jimmy Jones 21; Rebs: Red Robbins 13	Pts: Glen Combs 40; Rebs: John Beasley 15
Series tied, 3–3

Moody Coliseum, University Park, Texas
Attendance: 4,366

April 17

Box score

Dallas Chaparrals 95, New Orleans Buccaneers 101
Scoring by quarter: 22–24, 23–27, 24–29, 26–21
Pts: Cincy Powell 24; Rebs: John Beasley 14	Pts: Jimmy Jones 27; Rebs: Red Robbins 24
New Orleans wins series, 4–3

Loyola Field House, New Orleans, Louisiana
Attendance: 5,823

=== Eastern Division Semifinals ===
==== (1) Indiana Pacers vs. (3) Kentucky Colonels ====
Box score

Kentucky Colonels 128, Indiana Pacers 118
Scoring by quarter: 30–25, 22–32, 38–30, 38–31
Pts: Darel Carrier 40; Rebs: Gene Moore 21; Asts: Louie Dampier 3	Pts: Roger Brown 38; Rebs: Mel Daniels 16; Asts: Bobby Hooper 6
Kentucky leads series, 1–0

Indiana State Fairgrounds Coliseum, Indianapolis, Indiana
Attendance: 6,319

This was the first time that the Pacers and Colonels (separated by roughly just over 100 miles from Interstate 65) played each other in the postseason. As it turned out, they would play each other four more times in the next eight years.

April 9

Box score

Kentucky Colonels 115, Indiana Pacers 120
Scoring by quarter: 29–29, 24–30, 23–28, 39–33
Pts: Louie Dampier 31; Rebs: Gene Moore 13; Asts: Louie Dampier 4	Pts: Roger Brown 35; Rebs: Bob Netolicky 12; Asts: Freddie Lewis 5
Series tied, 1–1

Indiana State Fairgrounds Coliseum, Indianapolis, Indiana
Attendance: 6,789

April 10

Box score

Indiana Pacers 111, Kentucky Colonels 130
Scoring by quarter: 27–34, 25–30, 29–33, 30–33
Pts: Mel Daniels 23; Rebs: Roger Brown 15; Asts: Roger Brown 6	Pts: Darel Carrier 34; Rebs: Gene Moore 18; Asts: Louie Dampier 10
Kentucky leads series, 2–1

Louisville Convention Center, Louisville, Kentucky
Attendance: 4,235

April 13

Box score

Indiana Pacers 104, Kentucky Colonels 105 (OT)
Scoring by quarter: 27–23, 21–21, 22–24, 24–26, Overtime: 10–11
Pts: Freddie Lewis 26; Rebs: Mel Daniels 19; Asts: Freddie Lewis 5	Pts: Darel Carrier 24; Rebs: Jim Ligon 19; Asts: Carrier, Dampier 6 each
Kentucky leads series, 3–1

Louisville Convention Center, Louisville, Kentucky
Attendance: 3,079

April 14

Box score

Kentucky Colonels 97, Indiana Pacers 116
Scoring by quarter: 19–26, 27–26, 32–28, 19–36
Pts: Darel Carrier 21; Rebs: Jim Ligon 14; Asts: Darel Carrier 3	Pts: Bob Netolicky 35; Rebs: Mel Daniels 24; Asts: Freddie Lewis 8
Kentucky leads series, 3–2

Indiana State Fairgrounds Coliseum, Indianapolis, Indiana
Attendance: 5,612

April 15

Box score

Indiana Pacers 107, Kentucky Colonels 89
Scoring by quarter: 32–26, 27–22, 28–24, 20–17
Pts: Roger Brown 25; Rebs: Bob Netolicky 15; Asts: Lewis, Thacker 5 each	Pts: Louie Dampier 27; Rebs: Gene Moore 22; Asts: Ligon, Rascoe, Caldwell, Dampier 2 each
Series tied, 3–3

Louisville Convention Center, Louisville, Kentucky
Attendance: 4,633

April 17

Box score

Kentucky Colonels 111, Indiana Pacers 120
Scoring by quarter: 32–32, 25–27, 27–35, 27–26
Pts: Louie Dampier 26; Rebs: Gene Moore 12; Asts: Ligon, Carrier 3 each	Pts: Bob Netolicky 32; Rebs: Bob Netolicky 16; Asts: Brown, Lewis 3 each
Indiana wins series, 4–3

Indiana State Fairgrounds Coliseum, Indianapolis, Indiana
Attendance: 11,005

This was the first and only time in ABA history that a team overcame a 3–1 deficit to win a playoff series.

==== (2) Miami Floridians vs. (4) Minnesota Pipers ====
April 7

Box score

Minnesota Pipers 110, Miami Floridians 119
Scoring by quarter: 23–30, 22–22, 28–36, 37–31
Pts: Steve Vacendak 28; Rebs: Connie Hawkins 14	Pts: Donnie Freeman 33; Rebs: Skip Thoren 12
Miami leads series, 1–0

Miami Beach Auditorium, Miami Beach, Florida
Attendance: 4,103

April 9

Box score

Minnesota Pipers 106, Miami Floridians 99
Scoring by quarter: 21–24, 31–16, 25–31, 29–28
Pts: Connie Hawkins 26; Rebs: Trooper Washington 20	Pts: Donnie Freeman 21; Rebs: Skip Thoren14
Series tied, 1–1

West Palm Beach Auditorium, West Palm Beach, Florida
Attendance: 1,688

April 10

Box score

Miami Floridians 93, Minnesota Pipers 109
Scoring by quarter: 20–30, 22–30, 28–15, 23–34
Pts: Donnie Freeman 20; Rebs: Willie Murrell 10	Pts: Steve Vacendak 23; Rebs: Trooper Washington 20
Minnesota leads series, 2–1

Metropolitan Sports Center, Bloomington, Minnesota
Attendance: 1,520

April 12

Box score

Miami Floridians 116, Minnesota Pipers 109
Scoring by quarter: 29–28, 26–27, 33–27, 28–27
Pts: Willie Murrell 27; Rebs: Skip Thoren 26	Pts: Connie Hawkins 28; Rebs: Art Heyman 10
Series tied, 2–2

Metropolitan Sports Center, Bloomington, Minnesota
Attendance: 2,532

April 13

Box score

Minnesota Pipers 107, Miami Floridians 122
Scoring by quarter: 26–32, 20–29, 40–33, 21–28
Pts: Connie Hawkins 24; Rebs: Connie Hawkins 15	Pts: Willie Murrell 29; Rebs: Skip Thoren 21
Miami leads series, 3–2

Miami Beach Auditorium, Miami Beach, Florida
Attendance: 4,206

April 15

Box score

Miami Floridians 100, Minnesota Pipers 105
Scoring by quarter: 22–30, 25–30, 25–17, 28–28
Pts: Skip Thoren 19; Rebs: Les Hunter 13	Pts: Connie Hawkins 33; Rebs: Connie Hawkins 20
Series tied, 3–3

Metropolitan Sports Center, Bloomington, Minnesota
Attendance: 1,345

April 19

Box score

Minnesota Pipers 128, Miami Floridians 137
Scoring by quarter: 26–29, 19–35, 44–40, 39–33
Pts: Charlie Williams 31; Rebs: Connie Hawkins 13	Pts: Donnie Freeman 32; Rebs: Skip Thoren 16
Miami wins series, 4–3

Miami Beach Auditorium, Miami Beach, Florida
Attendance: 5,072

== Division Finals ==
=== Western Division Finals ===
==== (1) Oakland Oaks vs. (2) New Orleans Buccaneers ====
April 19

Box score

New Orleans Buccaneers 118, Oakland Oaks 128
Scoring by quarter: 30–30, 30–29, 35–39, 23–30
Pts: Jimmy Jones 45; Rebs: Robbins, Govan 13 each Asts: Jimmy Jones 8	Pts: Henry Logan 30; Rebs: Ira Harge 18; Asts: Henry Logan 3
Oakland leads series, 1–0

Oakland–Alameda County Coliseum Arena, Oakland, California
Attendance: 2,848

April 21

Box score

New Orleans Buccaneers 124, Oakland Oaks 135
Scoring by quarter: 30–31, 37–38, 29–41, 28–25
Pts: Jimmy Jones 31; Rebs: Red Robbins 19; Asts: Jimmy Jones 7	Pts: Gary Bradds 33; Rebs: Warren Jabali 16; Asts: Larry Brown 8
Oakland leads series, 2–0

Oakland–Alameda County Coliseum Arena, Oakland, California
Attendance: 1,749

April 23

Box score

Oakland Oaks 113, New Orleans Buccaneers 107
Scoring by quarter: 22–26, 28–24, 28–33, 35–24
Pts: Gary Bradds 33; Rebs: Gary Bradds 14; Asts: Ira Harge 3	Pts: S. Jones, J. Jones 26 each Rebs: Red Robbins 27; Asts: Jimmy Jones 8
Oakland leads series, 3–0

Loyola Field House, New Orleans, Louisiana
Attendance: 4,253

April 25

Box score

Oakland Oaks 128, New Orleans Buccaneers 114
Scoring by quarter: 28–27, 45–38, 25–29, 30–20
Pts: Warren Jabali 27; Rebs: Jim Eakins 14; Asts: Warren Jabali 5	Pts: Jimmy Jones 27; Rebs: Gerald Govan 12
Oakland wins series, 4–0

Loyola Field House, New Orleans, Louisiana
Attendance: 3,583

=== Eastern Division Finals ===
==== (1) Indiana Pacers vs. (2) Miami Floridians ====
April 20

Boxscore

Miami Floridians 110, Indiana Pacers 126
Scoring by quarter: 18–28, 24–32, 22–38, 46–28
Pts: Don Sidle 28; Rebs: Les Hunter 20; Asts: Hunter, McHartley, Anderson 4 each	Pts: Mel Daniels 32; Rebs: Mel Daniels 14; Asts: Tom Thacker 10
Indiana leads series, 1–0

Anderson High School Wigwam, Anderson, Indiana
Attendance: 8,721

Due to the Fairgrounds being booked for the circus, the Pacers played 35 miles down the road in Anderson, Indiana.

April 22

Boxscore

Miami Floridians 116, Indiana Pacers 131
Scoring by quarter: 29–22, 27–34, 25–38, 35–37
Pts: Freeman, McHartley 22 each Rebs: Hunter 13; Asts: Maurice McHartley 6	Pts: Roger Brown 33; Rebs: Bob Netolicky 19; Asts: Freddie Lewis 7
Indiana leads series, 2–0

Anderson High School Wigwam, Anderson, Indiana
Attendance: 7,243

April 23

Boxscore

Indiana Pacers 119, Miami Floridians 105
Scoring by quarter: 37–27, 27–25, 28–31, 27–22
Pts: Freddie Lewis 33; Rebs: Daniels, Peeples 9 each Asts: Tom Thacker 11	Pts: Donnie Freeman 23; Rebs: Skip Thoren 15; Asts: Willie Murrell 5
Indiana leads series, 3–0

Miami Beach Auditorium, Miami Beach, Florida
Attendance: 2,112

April 25

Boxscore

Indiana Pacers 110, Miami Floridians 114
Scoring by quarter: 33–24, 22–26, 27–34, 28–30
Pts: Roger Brown 44; Rebs: Daniels, Netolicky 12 each Asts: Tom Thacker 10	Pts: Don Sidle 27; Rebs: Sidle, Thoren 10 each Asts: Maurice McHartley 9
Indiana leads series, 3–1

Miami Beach Auditorium, Miami Beach, Florida
Attendance: 2,846

April 26

Boxscore

Miami Floridians 105, Indiana Pacers 127
Scoring by quarter: 20–28, 32–32, 29–34, 24–33
Pts: Donnie Freeman 26; Rebs: Don Sidle 13; Asts: Maurice McHartley 4	Pts: Freddie Lewis 35; Rebs: Bob Netolicky 10; Asts: Tom Thacker 8
Indiana wins series, 4–1

Indiana State Fairgrounds Coliseum, Indianapolis, Indiana
Attendance: 3,528

== ABA Finals: (W1) Oakland Oaks vs. (E1) Indiana Pacers ==
April 30

Box score

Indiana Pacers 85, Oakland Oaks 89
Scoring by quarter: 32–36, 28–28, 20–28, 34–31
Pts: Bob Netolicky 33; Rebs: Mel Daniels 18; Asts: Tom Thacker 4	Pts: Gary Bradds 40; Rebs: Gary Bradds 17; Asts: Larry Brown 9
Oakland leads series, 1–0

Oakland–Alameda County Coliseum Arena, Oakland, California
Attendance: 3,290

In the second half of the season, Gary Bradds had taken over for an injured Rick Barry and acquired the nickname of "super sub". In Game 1, the "super sub" scored 40 points while going 16-of-25 with a perfect eight-for-eight from the free throw line as Oakland's fast break offense eventually pressed over Indiana in the final quarter.

May 2

Box score

Indiana Pacers 150, Oakland Oaks 122
Scoring by quarter: 133–32, 40–18, 36–35, 41–37
Pts: Roger Brown 39; Rebs: Bob Netolicky 15; Asts: Bobby Hooper 7	Pts: Warren Jabali 31; Rebs: Warren Jabali 15; Asts: Larry Brown 5
Series tied, 1–1

Oakland–Alameda County Coliseum Arena, Oakland, California
Attendance: 4,171

The trio of Roger Brown, Bob Netolicky, and Freddie Lewis scored 110 points as the Pacers ran rough-shod over Oakland, scoring 40 points in the second quarter to lead by 23 at halftime. League MVP Mel Daniels had gone to the bench at the end of the first quarter with four fouls that led to their coach going to Netolicky to play center for the next two quarters, which resulted in him scoring 36 points. The Pacers won their first game over Oakland this year, having lost all six regular season matchups that year.

May 3

Box score

Oakland Oaks 134, Indiana Pacers 126 (OT)
Scoring by quarter: 26–30, 33–27, 33–31, 26–30, Overtime: 16–8
Pts: Warren Jabali 37; Rebs: Ira Harge 22; Asts: Larry Brown 8	Pts: Brown, Daniels 29 each Rebs: Bob Netolicky 19; Asts: Freddie Lewis 9
Oakland leads series, 2–1

Indiana State Fairgrounds Coliseum, Indianapolis, Indiana
Attendance: 8,467
Referees: Ron Rakel, Andy Hershock

A tight game saw 14 ties and a few lead changes that saw Oakland lead by six with just seven minutes to go before Freddie Lewis stoked a 10–0 run to give them a 109–105 lead. With the Pacers leading 117–115, Roger Brown had a chance at the free-throw line to give them a bigger lead. However, he could only make one free throw and Gary Bradds recovered the rebound on the last miss and called time out to give Oakland the ball at the backcourt of Indiana with time expiring. Warren Jabali then posted up for a three-pointer and hit from over 25 feet out to send the game into overtime (he had just made two of his last 16 shots from the three-line). The teams traded baskets in overtime before Oakland finally pulled away. With the score 126–125, Doug Moe hit two free throws before Jabali then hit a 22-foot shot to increase the lead to five as the Oaks eventually won by eight. Fans in Indiana were so emotional at the defeat that they apparently focused their attention on referees Ron Rakel and Andy Hershock and raised hands at them, with Rakel getting a cut lip.

May 5

Box score

Oakland Oaks 144, Indiana Pacers 117
Scoring by quarter: 33–22, 36–37, 41–21, 34–37
Pts: Warren Jabali 30; Rebs: Gary Bradds 19; Asts: Larry Brown 7	Pts: John Fairchild 18; Rebs: Netolicky, Daniels 9 each Asts: Bobby Hooper 11
Oakland leads series, 3–1

Indiana State Fairgrounds Coliseum, Indianapolis, Indiana
Attendance: 7,133

The two teams exchanged leads seven times in the first eight minutes before Doug Moe pulled Oakland ahead for good with a shot to make it 17–16 as Oakland would proceed to lead by 10 at halftime and by 30 at the close of the third quarter.

May 7

Box score

Indiana Pacers 131, Oakland Oaks 135 (OT)
Scoring by quarter: 28–31, 30–33, 30–31, 34–27, Overtime: 9–13
Pts: Freddie Lewis 33; Rebs: Mel Daniels 25; Asts: Freddie Lewis 7	Pts: Warren Jabali 39; Rebs: Ira Harge 14; Asts: Larry Brown 7
Oakland wins series, 4–1

Oakland–Alameda County Coliseum Arena, Oakland, California
Attendance: 6,340

Over 6,000 fans watched a climatic finish, among the biggest crowds attracted to see an Oaks game. The game went into overtime after Warren Jabali could only make one free throw to give Oakland a two-point lead before Ron Perry made two-of-three free throws (after being fouled by Ira Harge on a three-pointer shot) to create overtime. The Oaks, leading 131–130, were then boosted by Doug Moe making two free throws before getting the ball back after Roger Brown missed a shot before the ball eventually made it to Larry Brown, who was fouled with 14 seconds remaining to sink two more free throws to clinch the game.

Following the conclusion of the championship series, the Oaks were slated to have been the first ABA champion to ask for a competitive championship match against the NBA champions, which became the Boston Celtics. However, the Celtics would immediately reject to the idea, though the notion of the ABA champion asking the NBA champion to compete against each other to find out who the ultimate champion in the sport of basketball would supposedly continue beyond the Oaks with every other ABA champion presumably trying and failing to get a championship match-up to go down between each other, with the most famous attempt occurring in 1975.

The game turned out to be the last one played in Oakland. On August 21, 1969, the team was sold to Earl Foreman, who moved the team to Washington, D.C. in the summer despite owners Ken Davidson and Pat Boone saying differently in the title celebration (Rick Barry, who did not play the ABA Finals due to injury, claimed that Boone told him that the Oaks would never leave Oakland).

It was later revealed in the book Loose Balls that the championship ring that was acquired by the Oaks' owners was accidentally written on a blank check as $1.5 million for his bank to spend on, which also helped lead to the Oaks franchise being sold off to Foreman that year.

== Statistical leaders ==
Category	Total			Average			
Category	Player	Team	Total	Player	Team	Avg.	Games played
Points	Warren Jabali	Oakland Oaks	460	Jimmy Jones	New Orleans Buccaneers	30.2	11
Rebounds	Mel Daniels	Indiana Pacers	237	Red Robbins	New Orleans Buccaneers	15.9	15
Assists	Larry Brown	Oakland Oaks	87	Larry Brown	Oakland Oaks	5.4	11

=== Total leaders ===
Points

1. Warren Jabali - 460
2. Roger Brown - 459
3. Freddie Lewis - 409
4. Bob Netolicky - 383
5. Mel Daniels - 333

Rebounds

1. Mel Daniels - 237
2. Bob Netolicky - 214
3. Warren Jabali - 207
4. Ira Harge - 192
5. Red Robbins - 175

Assists

1. Larry Brown - 87
2. Freddie Lewis - 79
3. Tom Thacker - 69
4. Jimmy Jones - 59
5. Roger Brown - 57

Minutes

1. Freddie Lewis - 727
2. Bob Netolicky - 702
3. Roger Brown - 668
4. Warren Jabali - 662
5. Doug Moe - 593
