= Gary Bradds =

American basketball player (1942–1983)

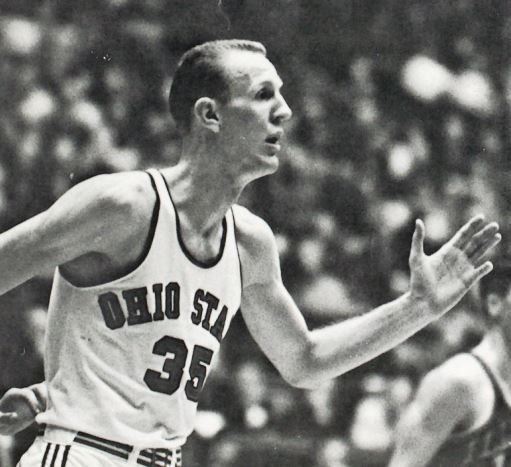
- Bradds in his senior season at Ohio State

Personal information
- Born: July 26, 1942 Jamestown, Ohio, U.S.
- Died: July 15, 1983 (aged 40) Columbus, Ohio, U.S.
- Listed height: 6 ft 8 in (2.03 m)
- Listed weight: 210 lb (95 kg)

Career information
- High school: Greeneview (Jamestown, Ohio)
- College: Ohio State (1961–1964)
- NBA draft: 1964: 1st round, 3rd overall pick
- Drafted by: Baltimore Bullets
- Playing career: 1964–1971
- Position: Power forward / small forward
- Number: 33, 30, 31, 40

Career history
- 1964–1966: Baltimore Bullets
- 1967–1969: Oakland Oaks / Washington Caps
- 1970: Carolina Cougars
- 1970–1971: Texas Chaparrals

Career highlights
- ABA champion (1969); AP Player of the Year (1964); UPI College Player of the Year (1964); Consensus first-team All-American (1964); Consensus second-team All-American (1963); 2× First-team All-Big Ten (1963, 1964); No. 35 retired by Ohio State Buckeyes

Career NBA and ABA statistics
- Points: 3,106 (12.2 ppg)
- Rebounds: 1,398 (5.5 rpg)
- Assists: 227 (0.9 apg)
- Stats at NBA.com
- Stats at Basketball Reference
Medals
Representing United States
Men's basketball
Pan American Games
Gold medal – first place	1963 São Paulo	Team Competition

Gary Lee "Tex" Bradds (July 26, 1942 – July 15, 1983) was an American basketball player. After a successful college career at Ohio State, where he was the 1964 College Player of the Year, he played an integral role with the 1968–69 Oakland Oaks, the American Basketball Association champions. He attended Greeneview High School, where he scored 61 points in a game (on December 8, 1959, versus Mt. Sterling). The school's gym is named in his honor.

== College ==
Bradds enrolled at University of Kentucky but transferred after two days.

He played collegiately for the Ohio State University. Was National Player of the Year and winner of the Adolph Rupp Trophy in 1964. Teammates included Jerry Lucas, John Havlicek, Bobby Knight, Mel Nowell, and Don DeVoe. Averaged 28.0 points and 13.0 rebounds as a junior, after replacing Jerry Lucas. Averaged 30.6 points and 13.4 rebounds as a senior. Had six consecutive 40 point games his senior year, including a school record 49 against Illinois (2/10/64).

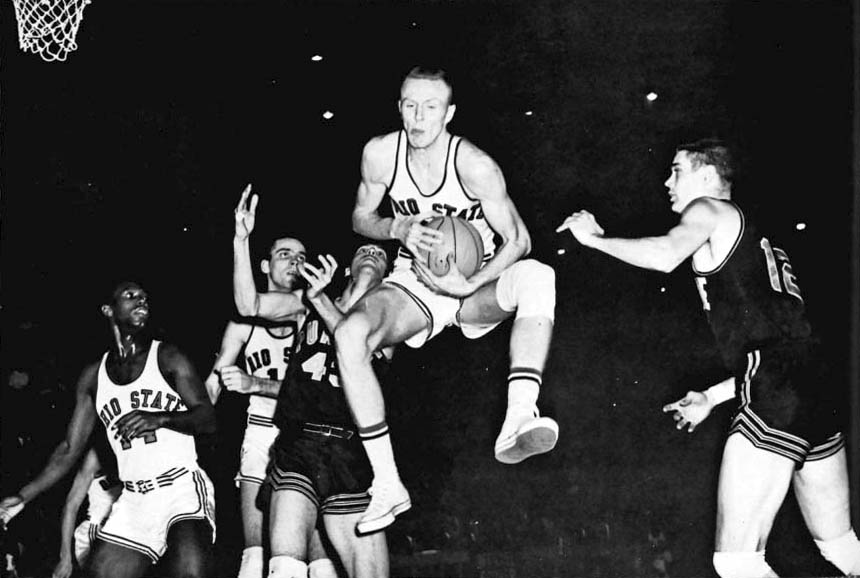
Bradds in action during an Ohio State v Purdue game in 1961

During the streak, Bradds averaged 44.3 points and scored 46% of Ohio State's points. It ended with Bradds scoring 30 points against Iowa. He also was a member of the 1963 Pan American Games, winning a gold medal. Pan Am team included Willis Reed and Lucious Jackson. Was captain of the team in 1964. His #35 has been retired at Ohio State (1/27/2001). Is a member of their Hall of Fame (inducted in 1978). Also, member of the Ohio Basketball Hall of Fame. Scored 15 points in the National Title game in 1962, leading team. Jerry Lucas once claimed that Bradds was the best player he played against all season "in practice". His 735 points in 1964 are second highest season total in school's history. Was Ohio States MVP in 1963 and 1964. Was Big Ten MVP in 1963 and 1964. Was All-American in 1963 and 1964. Ohio State had a 62–14 record while he was there. He averaged 20.7 points and 9.5 rebounds while shooting .535 percent from the field in 74 games. His 1,530 points and 706 rebounds still rank in the school's top ten of all time.

== Professional career ==
Bradds was selected by the Baltimore Bullets in the first round (No. 3 pick overall) of the 1964 NBA draft but played sparingly in his rookie season.

After his release three games into the 1965–66 season, Bradds signed with the Twin City Sailors of the North American Basketball League and was selected to the All-league Second Team. The next season he played with the Columbus Comets and gained All-First Team honors. After the 1966–67 season, his contract was sold to the Oakland Oaks of the new American Basketball Association. He had decided to retire but elected to take a two-year contract that essentially saw him be a bench player.

At the outset of the 1968–69 campaign, Bradds came off the bench for a star-studded Oaks team that featured future Hall of Famer Rick Barry, Warren Armstrong, Doug Moe, Larry Brown and Ira Harge. When Barry went down with a knee injury midway through the season, Bradds stepped up in a starter role and the league leaders missed nary a beat. He averaged 20.5 points and 10.1 rebounds in the playoffs with a high of 43 points against Minnesota.

Bradds went to play with the Washington Capitols (1969–70), Carolina Cougars and Texas Chaparrals (1970–71) in the ABA. In his career, he averaged 12.2 points and 5.5 rebounds in the regular season and 17.0 points and 7.9 rebounds in the playoffs. He ranks 67th in ABA history in free throws and 76th in free throw attempts. He ranked in the top 10 in free throw percentage in the 1968–69 season. His field goal percentage of .478 ranks 36th in ABA history, while free throw percentage of .803 is 32nd overall.

== Personal life ==
Following his pro career, Bradds was an assistant coach and Teacher and School Principal of Greeneview South Elementary . A much admired and respected local and national hero/role model to many, Bradds died on July 15, 1983, at the age of 40 of cancer. His son David played basketball at the University of Dayton. Also father of two daughters, Melinda and Lori. Cousin of American Jazz Guitarist Terry Bradds. Brother Gayle Bradds played basketball for Cedarville College. Bradds' grandson Evan is a college basketball player for Belmont University and was named the Ohio Valley Conference Player of the Year in 2016 and 2017.

== ABA and NBA statistics ==
=== Regular season ===
Legend
GP	Games played	GS	Games started	MPG	Minutes per game
FG%	Field goal percentage	3P%	3-point field goal percentage	FT%	Free throw percentage
RPG	Rebounds per game	APG	Assists per game	SPG	Steals per game
BPG	Blocks per game	PPG	Points per game	**Bold**	Career high
†	Won an NBA championship	*	Led the league

†	Denotes seasons in which Bradds' team won an ABA championship

Year	Team	GP	GS	MPG	FG%	3P%	FT%	RPG	APG	SPG	BPG	PPG
1964–65	Baltimore	41	–	8.2	.414	–	.714	2.0	0.5	–	–	3.3
1965–66	Baltimore	3	–	5.0	.333	.000	.750	2.7	0.3	–	–	2.3
1968–69†	Oakland (ABA)	**75**	–	30.0	**.497**	**.143**	.820	**7.7**	**1.2**	–	–	**18.7**
1969–70	Washington (ABA)	60	–	20.7	.480	.000	**.828**	5.6	0.9	–	–	13.4
1970–71	Carolina (ABA)	7	–	16.3	.378	.000	**.828**	5.6	0.9	–	–	13.4
1970–71	Texas (ABA)	19	–	10.9	.427	.000	.556	5.9	0.3	–	–	6.3
Career		254	–	20.5	.475	.056	.798	5.5	0.9	–	–	12.2

=== Playoffs ===
Year	Team	GP	GS	MPG	FG%	3P%	FT%	RPG	APG	SPG	BPG	PPG
1965	Baltimore	1	–	5.0	**.667**	–	**1.000**	2.0	0.0	–	–	6.0
1969†	Oakland (ABA)	**16**	–	**32.3**	.478	–	.835	**10.1**	**0.9**	–	–	**20.5**
1970	Washington (ABA)	6	–	19.3	.410	**1.000**	.500	2.8	0.5	–	–	9.5
Career		23	–	27.7	.467	1.000	.803	7.9	0.8	–	–	17.0
