= Gary Keller (basketball) =

American basketball player

Personal information
- Born: June 13, 1944 (age 82) Elizabeth, New Jersey
- Listed height: 6 ft 9 in (2.06 m)
- Listed weight: 220 lb (100 kg)

Career information
- High school: Dixie M. Hollins (St. Petersburg, Florida)
- College: Florida (1964–1967)
- NBA draft: 1967: 6th round, 59th overall pick
- Drafted by: Los Angeles Lakers
- Playing career: 1967–1969
- Position: Center / power forward
- Number: 51, 42

Career history
- 1967–1969: Minnesota Muskies / Miami Floridians

Career highlights
- 2× Second-team All-SEC (1966, 1967); Third-team Parade All-American (1962)
- Stats at Basketball Reference

Gary J. Keller (born June 13, 1944) is an American former college and professional basketball player who was a center and power forward in the American Basketball Association (ABA) for two seasons during the late 1960s. Keller played college basketball for the University of Florida, and thereafter, he played professionally for the Minnesota Muskies and the Miami Floridians of the ABA.

== Early years ==
Keller was born in Elizabeth, New Jersey in 1944. He grew up in St. Petersburg, Florida, where he attended Dixie M. Hollins High School. He played high school basketball for the Dixie Hollins Rebels, winning back-to-back Florida state championships in 1961 and 1962. He was a McDonald's fourth-team high school All-American selection as a senior.

== College career ==
Keller accepted an athletic scholarship to attend the University of Florida in Gainesville, Florida, and played for coach Norm Sloan and coach Tommy Bartlett's Florida Gators men's basketball teams from 1964 to 1967. The Gators finished 21–4 in 1967—their best-ever win-loss record up to that time. Keller was an Academic All-American, and graduated from Florida with a bachelor's degree in business administration in 1967. He was later inducted into the University of Florida Athletic Hall of Fame as a "Gator Great," and was recognized as an SEC Basketball Legend in 2003.

== Professional career ==
After his college career, Keller was drafted in the sixth round of the 1967 National Basketball Association (NBA) Draft by the Los Angeles Lakers, and by the Denver Nuggets in the 1967 ABA Draft. After the Nuggets traded him to the Minnesota Muskies, he chose to play for the Minnesota ABA franchise instead of the NBA. Keller averaged 6.0 points and 4.5 rebounds per game during his two ABA seasons.

== Life after basketball ==
Keller is married, and he and his wife Barbara live in St. Petersburg, Florida. They have a son and a daughter.

== Career statistics ==
Legend
GP	Games played	GS	Games started	MPG	Minutes per game
FG%	Field goal percentage	3P%	3-point field goal percentage	FT%	Free throw percentage
RPG	Rebounds per game	APG	Assists per game	SPG	Steals per game
BPG	Blocks per game	PPG	Points per game	**Bold**	Career high

=== ABA ===
==== Regular season ====
Year	Team	GP	MPG	FG%	3P%	FT%	RPG	APG	PPG
1967–68	Minnesota	**69**	**17.6**	.381	.000	**.650**	**5.6**	**.6**	**7.3**
1968–69	Miami	53	9.5	**.406**	.000	.600	3.2	.2	4.3
Career		122	14.0	.388	.000	.632	4.5	.4	6.0

==== Playoffs ====
Year	Team	GP	MPG	FG%	3P%	FT%	RPG	APG	PPG
1968	Minnesota	**10**	**14.2**	.373	–	.565	**5.0**	**.8**	**6.3**
1969	Miami	6	9.5	**.571**	–	**.600**	3.8	.5	5.0
Career		16	12.4	.420	–	.576	4.6	.7	5.8

== See also ==
- Florida Gators
- List of University of Florida alumni
- List of University of Florida Athletic Hall of Fame members
