= 1964 NCAA Men's Basketball All-Americans =

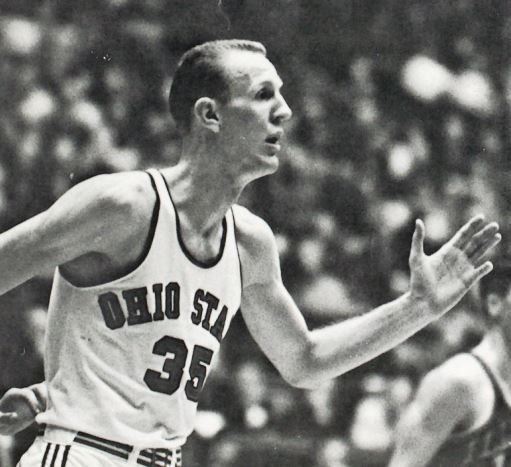
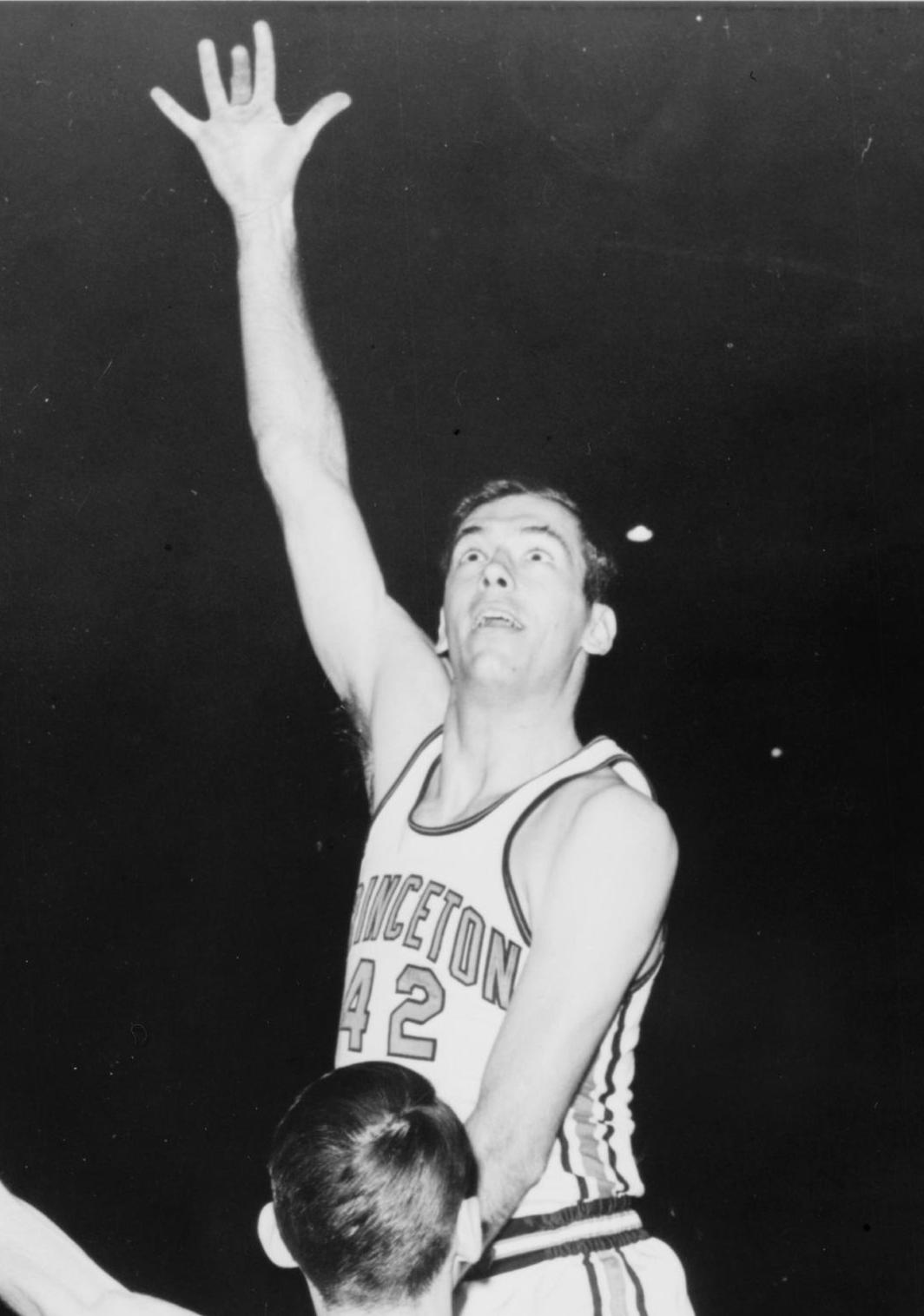
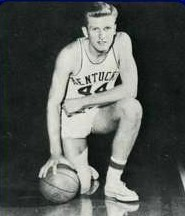
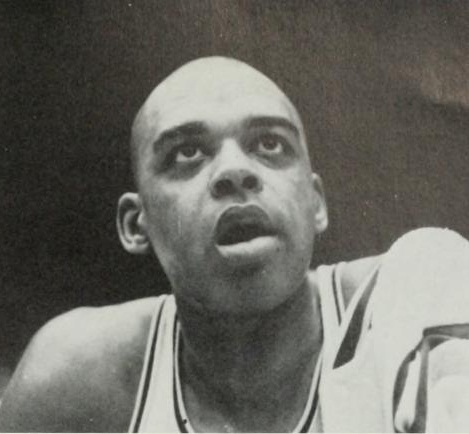
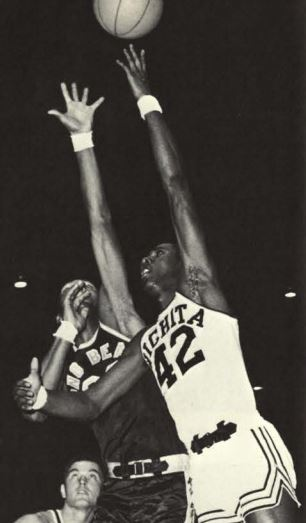
- The 1964 consensus first team. Clockwise from top left: Bradds, Bradley, Stallworth, Hazzard, Nash.
- Awarded for: 1963–64 NCAA University Division men's basketball season

The consensus 1964 College Basketball All-American team, as determined by aggregating the results of four major All-American teams. To earn "consensus" status, a player must win honors from a majority of the following teams: the Associated Press, the USBWA, the United Press International and the National Association of Basketball Coaches.

== 1964 Consensus All-America team ==
Consensus First Team
Player	Position	Class	Team
Gary Bradds	F	Senior	Ohio State
Bill Bradley	F	Junior	Princeton
Walt Hazzard	G	Senior	UCLA
Cotton Nash	F	Senior	Kentucky
Dave Stallworth	F	Junior	Wichita

Consensus Second Team
Player	Position	Class	Team
Ron Bonham	F	Senior	Cincinnati
Mel Counts	C	Senior	Oregon State
Fred Hetzel	F	Junior	Davidson
Jeff Mullins	G	Senior	Duke
Cazzie Russell	F	Sophomore	Michigan

== Individual All-America teams ==
All-America Team
All-America Team	First team		Second team		Third team	
All-America Team	Player	School	Player	School	Player	School
Associated Press	Gary Bradds	Ohio State	Ron Bonham	Cincinnati	Jim Barnes	Texas Western
Associated Press	Bill Bradley	Princeton	Mel Counts	Oregon State	Bill Buntin	Michigan
Associated Press	Walt Hazzard	UCLA	Fred Hetzel	Davidson	Howard Komives	Bowling Green
Associated Press	Cotton Nash	Kentucky	Jeff Mullins	Duke	Barry Kramer	NYU
Associated Press	Dave Stallworth	Wichita	Cazzie Russell	Michigan	Paul Silas	Creighton
USBWA	Gary Bradds	Ohio State	No second or third teams (10-man first team)			
USBWA	Bill Bradley	Princeton	No second or third teams (10-man first team)			
USBWA	Mel Counts	Oregon State	No second or third teams (10-man first team)			
USBWA	Billy Cunningham	North Carolina	No second or third teams (10-man first team)			
USBWA	Walt Hazzard	UCLA	No second or third teams (10-man first team)			
USBWA	Bud Koper	Oklahoma City	No second or third teams (10-man first team)			
USBWA	Jeff Mullins	Duke	No second or third teams (10-man first team)			
USBWA	Cotton Nash	Kentucky	No second or third teams (10-man first team)			
USBWA	Cazzie Russell	Michigan	No second or third teams (10-man first team)			
USBWA	Dave Stallworth	Wichita	No second or third teams (10-man first team)			
NABC	Gary Bradds	Ohio State	Jim Barnes	Texas Western	Ron Bonham	Cincinnati
NABC	Bill Bradley	Princeton	Mel Counts	Oregon State	Bill Buntin	Michigan
NABC	Walt Hazzard	UCLA	Jeff Mullins	Duke	Wayne Estes	Utah State
NABC	Cotton Nash	Kentucky	Cazzie Russell	Michigan	Fred Hetzel	Davidson
NABC	Dave Stallworth	Wichita	Paul Silas	Creighton	Barry Kramer	NYU
UPI	Gary Bradds	Ohio State	Ron Bonham	Cincinnati	Jim Barnes	Texas Western
UPI	Bill Bradley	Princeton	Mel Counts	Oregon State	Bill Buntin	Michigan
UPI	Walt Hazzard	UCLA	Fred Hetzel	Davidson	Wali Jones	Villanova
UPI	Cotton Nash	Kentucky	Jeff Mullins	Duke	Howard Komives	Bowling Green
UPI	Dave Stallworth	Wichita	Cazzie Russell	Michigan	Paul Silas	Creighton

AP Honorable Mention:

- Rick Barry, Miami (Florida)
- Joe Caldwell, Arizona State
- Freddie Crawford, St. Bonaventure
- Billy Cunningham, North Carolina
- Jim Davis, Colorado
- Ted Deeken, Kentucky
- Wayne Estes, Utah State
- Billy Foster, Drake
- Gail Goodrich, UCLA
- Ira Harge, New Mexico
- Brooks Henderson, Florida
- Les Hunter, Loyola–Chicago
- Wali Jones, Villanova
- Tom Kerwin, Centenary
- Don Kessinger, Ole Miss
- Bud Koper, Oklahoma City
- Clyde Lee, Vanderbilt
- Bennie Lenox, Texas A&M
- Rick Lopossa, Northwestern
- Willie Murrell, Kansas State
- Manny Newsome, Western Michigan
- Flynn Robinson, Wyoming
- Vic Rouse, Loyola–Chicago
- John Savage, North Texas
- Danny Schultz, Tennessee
- Willie Somerset, Duquesne
- Steve Thomas, Xavier
- John Thompson, Providence
- Nick Werkman, Seton Hall
- George Wilson, Cincinnati

== Academic All-Americans ==
Academic All-American teams were announced on March 25, 1964.

First Team
Player	School	Class
Art Becker	Arizona State	Senior
Jay Buckley	Duke	Senior
Paul Silas	Creighton	Senior
Dick Van Arsdale	Indiana	Junior
Gary Watts	Utah State	Senior

Second Team
Player	School	Class
Jim Caldwell	Georgia Tech	Junior
Larry Conley	Kentucky	Sophomore
Gary Hassman	Oklahoma State	Junior
Bill Robinette	Texas A&M	Junior
Mike Silliman	Army	Sophomore

Third Team
Player	School	Class
Gene Elmore	SMU	Junior
Rich Falk	Northwestern	Senior
Brian Generalovich	Pittsburgh	Senior
Max Moss	Kansas State	Junior
Dave Schellhase	Purdue	Sophomore

== See also ==
- 1963–64 NCAA University Division men's basketball season
