= 1967–68 Oakland Oaks season =

- Head coach: Bruce Hale
- Arena: Oakland–Alameda County Coliseum Arena

Results
- Record: 22–56 (.282)
- Place: Division: 6th (ABA)
- Playoff finish: Did not qualify
- Radio: KPAT

The 1967–68 Oakland Oaks season was the first season of the Oakland Oaks franchise in the American Basketball Association (ABA). Originally, Oakland's franchise was supposed to be called the Oakland Americans before the New Jersey Freighters' name change into the New Jersey Americans before the start of the inaugural ABA season saw them initially try to become the Oakland Jacks (in honor of Jack London) before later becoming the Oakland Oaks to partially honor the team of the same name from failed 1960's revival of the American Basketball League, but mostly honor the minor league baseball team of the same name from the Pacific Coast League. The Oaks played in the first ever game of the ABA on October 13, 1967, beating the Anaheim Amigos 134–129. Rick Barry attempted to defect to the Oaks due to being angered by San Francisco Warriors management's failure to pay him certain incentive awards he felt he was due. However the team sued to stop him from playing, which meant that he would sit out the season rather than play for the Warriors, subsequently doing radio broadcasts for the Oaks. The next season, Barry was allowed to play for the Oaks. The team struggled, finishing dead last in the West by 3 games, with the worst record in the ABA. The Oaks averaged 110.8 points a game (which was 4th best in the league), but gave up an average of 117.4 points, the worst in the league. According to the Elo rating system, the Oaks had the second-worst performance of any professional basketball team ever in a major league, of 1485 such team-seasons, with only the 1946–47 Pittsburgh Ironmen of the Basketball Association of America having a worse year. The Oaks played in various locations besides Oakland: two games in Fresno, California, one game in Fullerton, California, two neutral games each in Memphis, Tennessee and Portland, Oregon, two games in Richmond, California, two games in San Jose, California, and even a game in Sacramento, California.

== Roster ==
1967–68 Oakland Oaks roster
Players

Pos.	No.	Player	Height	Weight	DOB	From
G	44	Andrew Anderson	6 ft 2 in (1.88 m)	184 lb (83 kg)	July 6, 1945	Canisius
SG	44	Wes Bialosuknia	6 ft 2 in (1.88 m)	185 lb (84 kg)	June 8, 1945	Connecticut
PF	30	Gary Bradds	6 ft 8 in (2.03 m)	210 lb (95 kg)	July 26, 1942	Ohio State
C	55	Mike Dabich	7 ft 0 in (2.13 m)	242 lb (110 kg)	December 27, 1942	New Mexico State
SF	11	Ron Franz	6 ft 7 in (2.01 m)	205 lb (93 kg)	October 20, 1945	Kansas
C	42, 55	Jim Hadnot	6 ft 10 in (2.08 m)	235 lb (107 kg)	January 15, 1940	Providence
C	33	Ira Harge	6 ft 9 in (2.06 m)	225 lb (102 kg)	March 14, 1941	New Mexico
SG	31	Steve Jones	6 ft 5 in (1.96 m)	205 lb (93 kg)	October 17, 1942	Oregon
SF	32	Dave Lee	6 ft 7 in (2.01 m)	225 lb (102 kg)	March 31, 1942	San Francisco
PG	12	Barry Leibowitz	6 ft 2 in (1.88 m)	180 lb (82 kg)	September 10, 1945	Long Island
C	32	Wayne Molis	6 ft 8 in (2.03 m)	230 lb (104 kg)	April 17, 1943	Lewis
SF	40	Mel Peterson	6 ft 4 in (1.93 m)	185 lb (84 kg)	March 23, 1938	Wheaton (IL)
PF	33	Willie Porter	6 ft 7 in (2.01 m)	205 lb (93 kg)	July 3, 1941	Tennessee State
F	15	Al Salvadori	6 ft 9 in (2.06 m)	220 lb (100 kg)	May 6, 1945	South Carolina
SG	34	Levern Tart	6 ft 2 in (1.88 m)	195 lb (88 kg)	June 1, 1942	Bradley
C	30	Gene Wiley	6 ft 10 in (2.08 m)	210 lb (95 kg)	November 12, 1937	Wichita State

Coaches
Head coach
- Bruce Hale

Legend
- (DP) Unsigned draft pick
- (FA) Free agent
- (S) Suspended
- Injured

Roster

== Final standings ==
=== Western Division ===
Team	W	L	PCT.	GB
New Orleans Buccaneers	48	30	.615	–
Dallas Chaparrals	46	32	.590	2
Denver Rockets	45	33	.577	3
Houston Mavericks	29	49	.372	19
Anaheim Amigos	25	53	.321	23
Oakland Oaks	22	56	.282	26

== Awards and honors ==
1968 ABA All-Star Game selections (game played on January 9, 1968)

- Levern Tart
