= Hadnot =

Hadnot is a surname. Notable people with the surname include:

- James Hadnot (1957–2017), American football player
- Jim Hadnot (1940–1998), American basketball player
- Rex Hadnot (born 1982), American football player
