= Skip Thoren =

American basketball player

Personal information
- Born: April 5, 1943 (age 83) Rockford, Illinois, U.S.
- Listed height: 6 ft 10 in (2.08 m)
- Listed weight: 230 lb (104 kg)

Career information
- High school: Rockford East (Rockford, Illinois)
- College: Illinois (1962–1965)
- NBA draft: 1965: 4th round, 30th overall pick
- Drafted by: Baltimore Bullets
- Playing career: 1965–1970
- Position: Center
- Number: 50, 43

Career history
- 1965–1966: Simmenthal Milano
- 1966–1967: Twin Cities Sailors
- 1967–1970: Minnesota Muskies / Miami Floridians

Career highlights
- ABA All-Star (1969); EuroLeague champion (1966); Second-team All-American – AP (1965); Third-team All-American – NABC, UPI (1965); Third-team Parade All-American (1961)
- Stats at Basketball Reference

Duane W. "Skip" Thoren (born April 5, 1943) is an American former professional basketball player. At a height of 6 ft 10 in (2.08 m) tall, he played at the center position.

== High school ==
A native of Rockford, Illinois, Thoren attended Rockford East High School from 1957–58 to 1960–61 and led the E-Rabs to the "Elite 8" of the Illinois High School Association state basketball tournament, losing to the eventual state champion Collinsville High School in the quarterfinals of the 1961 tournament. Thoren led the E-Rabs to consecutive regional championships and 20 win seasons.

As a junior his team finished the season with an overall record of 21 wins and only 5 losses and a Big 8 Conference record of 7 wins and 3 losses, finishing in second place. Ironically this team would lose in the state tournament to conference opponent, Freeport in the IHSA sectional on March 9, 1960. In his 24 games as a junior, Thoren scored 513 points, averaging 19.7 points per game and was named second team all-conference at center.

As a senior, Thoren's team dominated the conference, losing only to East Aurora High School mid-season and finish the conference portion of the campaign with a 9–1 record. In the 28 games played during the season, Erickson played in 27 and lead the team in scoring at 632 points, averaging 23.4 points per game and he would be named first-team all-conference at the center position. When the conference portion of the season ended, the E-Rabs compiled an overall record of 20 wins and only 1 loss. During regional and sectional play, Thoren's team defeated all of the competition until the "Elite-Eight" where they lost to eventual champion Collinsville on the evening of March 17, 1961 at Huff Gymnasium in Champaign. Even though the E-Rabs only played two games in the tournament, Thoren was the ninth leading scorer with 43 points and Rockford East finished with an AP ranking of number 3. In his two years of varsity basketball, Thoren scored 1,145 points in 53 games, averaging 21.6 points per game. After the season, Thoren was named to the All-State team.

== College career ==
Thoren chose to play college basketball at the University of Illinois at Urbana–Champaign after high school and was a member of the freshman basketball team for the 1961–62 season. He played in every single game during his three-year career and was the starting center for the final two seasons, replacing Bill Burwell. As a sophomore during the 1962-63 season, Thoren joined fellow sophomore, Tal Brody and future Illini hall of fame athlete, Dave Downey, on a team that would finish with an overall record of 20–6 and a Big Ten record of 11 and 3, placing them in a tie for the conference championship. At the end of the regular season, Illinois would advanced to the NCAA tournament, playing in the Mideast Region. The Illini would defeat Bowling Green in the second round to earn a berth in the "Elite Eight", but would lose to eventual national champion Loyola, 79–64 at Jenison Fieldhouse.

In his junior season of 1963–64, the Fighting Illini would start the season with 10 wins and only 3 losses, however, the team would falter and lose seven of its next eight games, dropping them in the conference standings. During the season, on December 28, 1963, in a game versus UCLA, Thoren set the all-time single game rebounding record for Illinois with 24 rebounds. The Illini would finish the season 13–11 overall and 6–8 in the conference. After the season, Thoren was named second team All-Big Ten and was dubbed an Honorable Mention All-American team MVP as well as captain for the following season.

During Thoren's senior season, the Illini returned to their winning ways for 1964–65. Overall Illinois would finish the season with an 18–6 record while finishing third in the Big Ten with a 10–4 record, losing twice to top-ranked Michigan. During the season the team would win the Kentucky Invitational Tournament and finish the year with a Coaches ranking of number 16. After the season, Thoren would be named team MVP as well as 1st team All-Big Ten and 1st team All-American. During his playing time at Illinois, Thoren's teams would win 51 of 74 games and win the 1963 championship.

Thoren is recognized as a notable member of the athletic fraternity Beta Theta Pi Fraternity House (Champaign, Illinois).

== Professional career ==
Thoren played three seasons (1967–1970) in the American Basketball Association (ABA), as a member of the Minnesota Muskies and Miami Floridians. He averaged 13.2 points per game and 11.0 rebounds per game, in his career, and appeared in the 1969 ABA All-Star Game.

Before playing in the ABA, Thoren played in Italy, with Simmenthal Milano, along with Bill Bradley, and he won the 1965–66 season FIBA European Champions Cup (EuroLeague) championship.

== Honors ==
=== Basketball ===
- 1964 - Team MVP
- 1964 - 2nd Team All-Big Ten
- 1964 - Honorable Mention All American
- 1965 - Team Captain
- 1965 - Team MVP
- 1965 - 1st Team All-Big Ten
- 1965 - 1st Team All American
- 1974 - Inducted into the Illinois Basketball Coaches Association's Hall of Fame as a player.
- 2004 - Elected to the "Illini Men's Basketball All-Century Team".
- 2008 - Honored jersey which hangs in the State Farm Center to show regard for being the most decorated basketball players in the University of Illinois' history.

== Statistics ==
=== College ===
Season	Games	Points	PPG	Field Goals	Attempts	Avg	Free Throws	Attempts	Avg	Rebounds	Avg	Big Ten Record	Overall Record
1962–63	26	143	5.5	53	125	.424	37	58	.638	150	5.8	11–3	20–6
1963–64	24	488	20.3	187	373	.501	74	114	.649	331	13.8	6–8	13–11
1964–65	24	533	22.2	219	391	.560	95	137	.693	349	14.5	10–4	18–6
**Totals**	**74**	**1164**	**15.7**	**459**	**889**	**.516**	**206**	**309**	**.667**	**830**	**11.2**	**27–15**	**51–23**

=== ABA career statistics ===
Legend
GP	Games played	MPG	Minutes per game
FG%	Field-goal percentage	FT%	Free-throw percentage
RPG	Rebounds per game	APG	Assists per game
PPG	Points per game	**Bold**	Career high

==== Regular season ====
Year	Team	GP	MPG	FG%	FT%	RPG	APG	PPG
1967–68	Minnesota	63	19.1	.434	**.622**	6.9	.9	8.2
1968–69	Miami	**78**	33.9	**.484**	.615	13.4	2.5	**16.7**
1969–70	Miami	29	**35.2**	.451	.594	**13.6**	**2.6**	14.5
Career		170	28.6	.465	.612	11.0	1.9	13.2

==== Playoffs ====
Year	Team	GP	MPG	FG%	FT%	RPG	APG	PPG
1968	Minnesota	2	26.0	**.500**	**.583**	**13.5**	**2.0**	**17.5**
1969	Miami	**12**	**33.5**	.473	.574	12.9	1.4	13.1
Career		14	32.4	.478	.575	13.0	1.5	13.7

==== All-star game ====
Year	Team	GP	MPG	FG%	FT%	RPG	APG	PPG
1969	Miami	1	17.0	.250	0.0	5.0	2.0	2.0
