= Paul Silas =

American basketball player and coach (1943–2022)

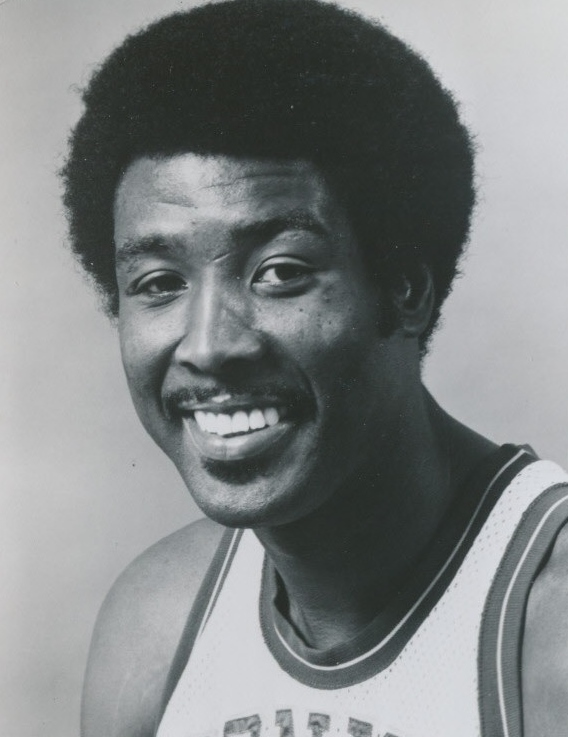
- Silas with the Seattle SuperSonics in 1977

Personal information
- Born: July 12, 1943 Prescott, Arkansas, U.S.
- Died: December 10, 2022 (aged 79) Denver, North Carolina, U.S.
- Listed height: 6 ft 7 in (2.01 m)
- Listed weight: 220 lb (100 kg)

Career information
- High school: McClymonds (Oakland, California)
- College: Creighton (1961–1964)
- NBA draft: 1964: 2nd round, 10th overall pick
- Drafted by: St. Louis Hawks
- Playing career: 1964–1980
- Position: Power forward
- Number: 29, 12, 35, 36
- Coaching career: 1980–2012

Career history

Playing
- 1964–1969: St. Louis / Atlanta Hawks
- 1969–1972: Phoenix Suns
- 1972–1976: Boston Celtics
- 1976–1977: Denver Nuggets
- 1977–1980: Seattle SuperSonics

Coaching
- 1980–1983: San Diego Clippers
- 1988–1989: New Jersey Nets (assistant)
- 1989–1992: New York Knicks (assistant)
- 1992–1995: New Jersey Nets (assistant)
- 1995–1997: Phoenix Suns (assistant)
- 1997–1999: Charlotte Hornets (assistant)
- 1999–2002: Charlotte Hornets
- 2002–2003: New Orleans Hornets
- 2003–2005: Cleveland Cavaliers
- 2010–2012: Charlotte Bobcats

Career highlights
- 3× NBA champion (1974, 1976, 1979); 2× NBA All-Star (1972, 1975); 2× NBA All-Defensive First Team (1975, 1976); 3× NBA All-Defensive Second Team (1971–1973); Second-team All-American – NABC (1964); Third-team All-American – AP, UPI (1964); NCAA rebounding leader (1963); No. 35 retired by Creighton Bluejays; Second-team Parade All-American (1960); California Mr. Basketball (1960)

Career playing statistics
- Points: 11,782 (9.4 ppg)
- Rebounds: 12,357 (9.9 rpg)
- Assists: 2,572 (2.1 apg)
- Stats at NBA.com
- Stats at Basketball Reference

Career coaching record
- NBA: 387–488 (.442)
- Record at Basketball Reference
- Collegiate Basketball Hall of Fame

Paul Theron Silas (July 12, 1943 – December 10, 2022) was an American professional basketball player and head coach in the National Basketball Association (NBA). As a player, he was a two-time NBA All-Star and earned five selections to the NBA All-Defensive Team, including twice on the first team. He won three NBA championships: two with the Boston Celtics and one with the Seattle SuperSonics. Silas is the leader in most rebounds per game with 12.1 in Suns franchise history.

In high school, Silas was named a second-team Parade All-American and voted California Mr. Basketball. He played college basketball for the Creighton Bluejays, earning second-team All-American honors as a senior in 1964. He was selected in the second round of the 1964 NBA draft, and played 16 seasons in the league. After his playing career, Silas was a head coach for 12 seasons.

== Early life ==
Silas was born on July 12, 1943, in Prescott, Arkansas. His family moved to Oakland, California, when he was eight. Initially, they shared a home in Oakland with his cousins, four of whom became members of the rhythm & blues group The Pointer Sisters.

Silas attended McClymonds High School, where he was named California Mr. Basketball and a second-team Parade All-American as a senior. He was undefeated with the Warriors, who went 68–0 and were the No. 1 team in California from 1958 to 1960. His teammates included future pro basketball players Jim Hadnot and Joe Ellis, football player Wendell Hayes, and baseball player Aaron Pointer, another cousin of Silas.

== College career ==
Silas attended Creighton University, where he set an NCAA record for the most rebounds in a three-year career and was the Division I rebounding leader for the 1962–63 season with 20.6 rebounds per game. He was named a second-team All-American by the National Association of Basketball Coaches in 1964. Silas' career scoring average was over 20 points per game. However, his offense dropped after he suffered a torn tendon in his right leg as a junior, after which, he focused on his inside game. He was voted into the National Collegiate Basketball Hall of Fame in 2017.

== Professional playing career ==
Silas was selected by the St. Louis Hawks in the second round of the 1964 NBA draft with the 12th overall pick. After a relatively slow career start, Silas reached double figures in both rebounds and points per game during the 1967–68 season, in which he averaged 11.7 rebounds per game and 13.4 points per game. His rebounding average was third best on the Hawks that season, behind teammates Zelmo Beaty (11.7 rpg) and Bill Bridges (13.4 rpg). After five seasons with the Hawks, Silas was traded to the Phoenix Suns for Gary Gregor, who had been named to the 1969 NBA All-Rookie Team.

During his three seasons with the Suns, Silas averaged a double-double in rebounds and points each season, was named to the NBA All-Defensive Second Team in 1971 and 1972, and played in the 1972 NBA All-Star Game. During the 1971–72 season, his third with the Suns, Silas grabbed 955 rebounds in 80 games, and scored what would be a career-high 17.5 points per game. In September 1972, Silas was sent to the Boston Celtics in a deal which allowed the Suns to acquire the rights to Charlie Scott, who had led the American Basketball Association in scoring with 34.6 points per game during its 1971–72 season.

While with the Celtics, Silas was named to the NBA All-Defensive Second Team in 1973, the NBA All-Defensive First Team in 1975 and 1976, and played in the 1975 NBA All-Star Game. Silas was a key contributor to the Celtics' NBA championships in 1974 and 1976. His inside play freed up their undersized center, 6-foot-9-inch (2.06 m) Dave Cowens, whose shooting ability from the outside opened up the interior for Silas.

Following their title in 1976, Boston general manager Red Auerbach traded Silas to the Denver Nuggets after a salary dispute. After one season (1976–77) with the Nuggets, Silas was traded to the Seattle SuperSonics. He played an important role with Seattle as an enforcer, and the SuperSonics reached the championship series in both 1978 and 1979 with Silas, winning an NBA title in 1979 in five games in a rematch against the Washington Bullets.

During his NBA career, Silas collected more than 10,000 points and 10,000 rebounds over sixteen seasons, played in two NBA All-Star games, and won three championship rings (two with the Boston Celtics in 1974 and 1976, and one with the Seattle SuperSonics in 1979). He was named to the All-NBA Defensive First Team twice, and to the All-NBA Defensive Second Team three times. Silas is one of 31 players to have averaged 10 points and 10 rebounds in the same season on eight occasions.

== Coaching career ==
Immediately upon retirement, Silas started his coaching career with the San Diego Clippers from 1980 to 1983, becoming their head coach, compiling a 78–168 record for a team that struggled with injuries to stars, including Bill Walton. After taking time off, Silas was an assistant coach for the New Jersey Nets for one season from 1988 to 1989, and then became an assistant coach with the New York Knicks from 1989 to 1992 as one of the holdovers from the Stu Jackson and John Macleod eras. Silas then went back to work for the Nets as an assistant under Chuck Daly and later Butch Beard from 1992 to 1995, leaving to work with the Suns from 1995 to 1997. At one point, Silas was one of the names considered for the head coaching job of the Boston Celtics in the summer of 1995, before general manager M.L. Carr decided to name himself as coach of the team.

After joining the coaching staff of the Charlotte Hornets in 1997, Silas was finally given another chance as a coach after becoming the interim coach of the Hornets when Dave Cowens was fired after a 4–11 record. Under Silas, the Hornets turned it around and went 22–13 to finish the lockout-shortened season 26–24, missing the playoffs by one game. Silas had the interim tag lifted off of his status and became the full-time head coach of the Hornets from 1999 all the way into their first season where they moved to New Orleans. Coaching the team from 1999 to 2003, Silas had a 208–155 record, taking the team into the playoffs each season he was the head coach after that 1999 season, including two Eastern Conference Semifinals appearances. Silas had a reputation of being a coach who was very honest but fair with his criticism of his players, which they mostly appreciated. Silas was fired as coach on May 4, 2003, in a move that puzzled many Hornets players (including Baron Davis) who enjoyed playing for him.

Silas was head coach of the Cleveland Cavaliers from 2003 to 2005. Hired to mentor 18-year-old rookie LeBron James as his first head coach as a professional player, Silas' tenure was rife with controversy as he feuded with veteran point guard Eric Snow. The new owner of the team, Dan Gilbert, fired him in the middle of the season, with the Cavaliers at 34–30 and in fifth place in the Eastern Conference. The Cavs collapsed after Silas' firing, missing the playoffs with a 42–40 record after losing a tiebreaker with the New Jersey Nets.

Silas then worked for ESPN, although in April 2007, he interviewed for the vacant head coaching position with the Charlotte Bobcats (later known as the Charlotte Hornets) which was eventually filled by Sam Vincent. Upon the firing of Vincent in April 2008, he stated that coaching the Bobcats would be a "dream job."

On December 22, 2010, Silas was named interim head coach of the Bobcats, replacing the outgoing coach Larry Brown. On February 16, 2011, the Bobcats removed his interim status. In 2011–12, Charlotte had a league-worst 7–59 record, the worst winning percentage in league history (.106). On April 30, 2012, the Bobcats announced that Silas would not return for the 2012–2013 season.

== Personal life ==
Silas married Carolyn Kemp in 1966. They had two children, Paula and Stephen. Silas had a stepdaughter, Donna, from Carolyn's first marriage. His son, Stephen, was added to his Charlotte coaching staff in 2000.

Silas died of cardiac arrest on December 10, 2022, at home in Denver, North Carolina. He was 79.

== Career statistics ==
Legend
GP	Games played	GS	Games started	MPG	Minutes per game
FG%	Field goal percentage	3P%	3-point field goal percentage	FT%	Free throw percentage
RPG	Rebounds per game	APG	Assists per game	SPG	Steals per game
BPG	Blocks per game	PPG	Points per game	**Bold**	Career high
†	Won an NBA championship	*	Led the league

=== NBA playing statistics ===
==== Regular season ====
Year	Team	GP	GS	MPG	FG%	3P%	FT%	RPG	APG	SPG	BPG	PPG
1964–65	St. Louis	79		15.7	.373		.506	7.3	.6			4.6
1965–66	St. Louis	46		12.7	.405		.574	5.1	.5			3.8
1966–67	St. Louis	77		20.4	.429		.531	8.7	1.0			6.8
1967–68	St. Louis	**82**		32.3	.458		.705	11.7	2.0			13.4
1968–69	Atlanta	79		23.5	.419		.613	9.4	1.8			8.7
1969–70	Phoenix	78		36.4	.464		.607	11.7	2.7			12.8
1970–71	Phoenix	81		36.3	.428		.685	12.5	3.0			11.9
1971–72	Phoenix	80		**38.5**	**.470**		.773	11.9	**4.3**			**17.5**
1972–73	Boston	80		32.7	**.470**		.700	**13.0**	3.1			13.3
1973–74†	Boston	**82***		31.7	.440		**.783**	11.2	2.3	**.8**	.2	11.5
1974–75	Boston	**82**		32.5	.417		.709	12.5	2.7	.7	.3	10.6
1975–76†	Boston	81		32.9	.426		.709	12.7	2.5	.7	**.4**	10.7
1976–77	Denver	81		24.2	.360		.667	7.5	1.6	.7	.3	7.2
1977–78	Seattle	**82**		26.5	.397		.586	8.2	1.8	**.8**	.2	5.8
1978–79†	Seattle	**82***		23.9	.423		.598	7.0	1.4	.4	.2	5.6
1979–80	Seattle	**82**		19.5	.378	–	.654	5.3	.8	.3	.1	3.8
Career		1,254		27.9	.432	–	.673	9.9	2.1	.6	.2	9.4
All-Star		2	0	15.0	.200		.800	5.5	1.5	4.0	.0	4.0

==== Playoffs ====
Year	Team	GP	GS	MPG	FG%	3P%	FT%	RPG	APG	SPG	BPG	PPG
1965	St. Louis	4		10.5	.400		.750	4.5	.3			2.8
1966	St. Louis	7		11.4	.278		.727	4.9	.3			2.6
1967	St. Louis	8		15.3	.250		.611	6.5	.8			3.6
1968	St. Louis	6		29.7	.431		.711	9.5	3.5			11.8
1969	Atlanta	11		23.5	.362		.514	8.4	1.9			5.5
1970	Phoenix	7		40.9	.422		.656	**15.9**	**4.3**			**16.1**
1973	Boston	13		39.4	.392		.620	15.1	3.0			9.6
1974†	Boston	18		31.9	.397		.830	10.6	2.6	.7	.5	8.0
1975	Boston	11		36.8	**.457**		.640	11.8	3.6	1.1	.2	9.1
1976†	Boston	18		**41.2**	.448		.812	13.7	2.3	**1.3**	.3	10.8
1977	Denver	6		23.5	.424		.542	6.7	2.7	.3	**.7**	6.8
1978	Seattle	**22**		27.5	.351		.683	8.5	1.6	.5	.3	4.9
1979†	Seattle	17		24.6	.389		.674	5.8	1.1	.5	.3	4.3
1980	Seattle	15		17.1	.302	–	**.846**	5.0	1.0	.6	.1	2.5
Career		163		28.7	.397	–	.692	9.4	2.1	.8	.3	6.9

=== Head coaching record ===
Legend
Regular season	G	Games coached	W	Games won	L	Games lost	W–L %	Win–loss %
Playoffs	PG	Playoff games	PW	Playoff wins	PL	Playoff losses	PW–L %	Playoff win–loss %

Team	Year	G	W	L	W–L%	Finish	PG	PW	PL	PW–L%	Result
San Diego	1980–81	82	36	46	.439	5th in Pacific	—	—	—	—	Missed Playoffs
San Diego	1981–82	82	17	65	.207	6th in Pacific	—	—	—	—	Missed Playoffs
San Diego	1982–83	82	25	57	.305	6th in Pacific	—	—	—	—	Missed Playoffs
Charlotte	1998–99	35	22	13	.629	5th in Central	—	—	—	—	Missed Playoffs
Charlotte	1999–2000	82	49	33	.598	2nd in Central	4	1	3	.250	Lost in First Round
Charlotte	2000–01	82	46	36	.561	3rd in Central	10	6	4	.600	Lost in Conf. Semifinals
Charlotte	2001–02	82	44	38	.537	2nd in Central	9	4	5	.444	Lost in Conf. Semifinals
New Orleans	2002–03	82	47	35	.573	3rd in Central	6	2	4	.333	Lost in First Round
Cleveland	2003–04	82	35	47	.427	5th in Central	—	—	—	—	Missed Playoffs
Cleveland	2004–05	64	34	30	.531	(fired)	—	—	—	—	—
Charlotte	2010–11	54	25	29	.463	4th in Southeast	—	—	—	—	Missed Playoffs
Charlotte	2011–12	66	7	59	.106	5th in Southeast	—	—	—	—	Missed Playoffs
**Career**		875	387	488	.442		29	13	16	.448	

== See also ==
- List of National Basketball Association career games played leaders
- List of National Basketball Association career rebounding leaders
- List of National Basketball Association career playoff rebounding leaders
- List of NCAA Division I men's basketball players with 30 or more rebounds in a game
- List of NCAA Division I men's basketball season rebounding leaders
- List of NCAA Division I men's basketball career rebounding leaders
