= Jim Hadnot =

American professional basketball player (1940–1998)

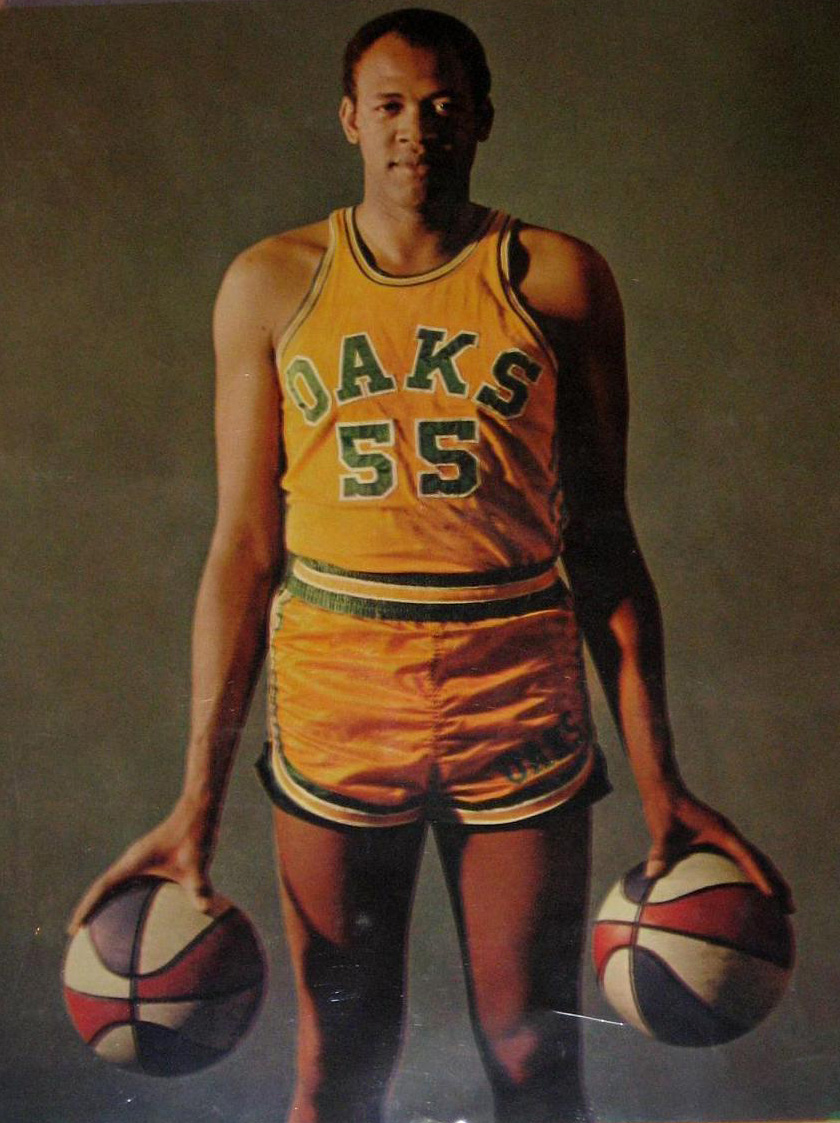
- Hadnot as a member of the Oakland Oaks during the 1967–68 season.

Personal information
- Born: January 15, 1940 Jasper, Texas, U.S.
- Died: August 2, 1998 (aged 58)
- Listed height: 6 ft 10 in (2.08 m)
- Listed weight: 235 lb (107 kg)

Career information
- High school: McClymonds (Oakland, California)
- College: Providence (1959–1962)
- NBA draft: 1962: 3rd round, 25th overall pick
- Drafted by: Boston Celtics
- Playing career: 1962–1968
- Position: Center
- Number: 42, 55

Career history
- 1962: Oakland Oaks (ABL)
- 1963–1964: Trenton Colonials
- 1967–1968: Oakland Oaks (ABA)

Career highlights
- All-EPBL Second Team (1964)

Career ABA statistics
- Points: 1,344 (17.5 ppg)
- Rebounds: 936 (12.2 rpg)
- Assists: 135 (1.8 apg)
- Stats at Basketball Reference

James Weldon Hadnot (January 15, 1940 – August 2, 1998) was an American professional basketball center who spent one season in the American Basketball Association (ABA) as a member of the Oakland Oaks during the 1967–68 season. He attended Providence College, class of 1962. He was 6'10.

== Early life ==
Hadnot grew up in Oakland, California and attended McClymond's High School, the same high school that Celtics legend Bill Russell graduated from. Hadnot and Russell would develop a tight relationship with one another as a result of this connection, with Russell serving as a father figure to the younger Hadnot after the untimely death of his biological dad.

== College ==
Following his successful 4-year tenure at McClymond's, Hadnot became one of the most sought-after young high schoolers in the country. Bill Russell first brought up the prospect of attending Providence to his attention, urging him to go to the program due to the fact that their campus was close to Russell's home in Reading, Massachusetts. Hadnot lived alongside Russell and his then-wife Rose Swisher for some time en route to becoming Providence college's all-time leader in points (1,462) and rebounds (1,299) before graduating in 1962. He also helped lead the team to an NIT title in 1961. In 1962, his final season with the Friars, Hadnot played alongside future Georgetown coaching legend John Thompson. Over the course of his three year stint at Providence, Hadnot averaged 17.5 points, 15.5 rebounds, and 2.6 fouls.

== Professional career ==
=== NBA ===
Hadnot would be drafted 27th overall by the Boston Celtics in the third round of 1962 NBA draft, but failed to make the team. Boston also drafted Hadnot's fellow Providence teammate Vinnie Ernst 54th overall in that same draft, but he was also cut from the team shortly thereafter.

Hadnot played for the ill-fated Oakland Oaks in the American Basketball League. The team went 11–14 before the league folded in late December 1962.

Hadnot played for the Trenton Colonials of the Eastern Professional Basketball League (EPBL) during the 1963–64 season and was selected to the All-EPBL Second Team.

=== ABA ===
Six years after his failed run in the NBA, Hadnot returned to his hometown of Oakland, California to attempt to make a splash in a new up-and-coming basketball league known as the American Basketball Association. The ABA was just embarking on their first season of play and would quickly become the NBA's primary rival as a result of their innovative additions to the game such as the 3-Point Line, Dunk Contest, and multicolored ball. At 28 years of age, Hadnot signed a deal with the Oakland Oaks and quickly became one of their most beloved players, boasting a statline of 39.0 minutes, 17.5 points, and 12.2 rebounds in 77 games of play during his rookie campaign. Hadnot had an uncanny ability to get to the line, shooting over 7 free throws a game despite his scoring average barely even doubling this total. Oakland struggled in their opening season, winning only 22 games. Hadnot did not return to the Oaks organization for the 1968–69 season. Oakland would win 60 games and secure the ABA championship in their first season without Hadnot following a blockbuster free agency move that involved superstar forward Rick Barry leaving the NBA and joining the franchise. To this day, Hadnot's 12.2 rebounds per game and 936 total rebounds remain the most total boards secured by a player with a career lasting only one season. Hadnot snatched the 30th-most total rebounds in NBA/ABA rookie history, being only surpassed by a group of players consisting of 18 Hall of Famers and 10 other all-stars. He and fellow Oakland teammate Ira Harge are the only two players in NBA/ABA history to secure 900+ rebounds in their rookie seasons and never receive an All-Star nod at any point in their careers. No rookie has surpassed Hadnot's 936 rebounds total in the past 28 years, with Shaquille O'Neal's total of 1,122 rebounds during his rookie season with the Orlando Magic being the last time any player has passed this mark.

== Personal life ==
Following his one-year stint in the ABA, Hadnot worked as a scout for the Sacramento Kings and New Jersey Nets over the span of a decade. On February 14, 2015, Hadnot's jersey was retired by Providence College. Hadnot was the godfather of Jason Kidd.

== Career statistics ==
Legend
GP	Games played	GS	Games started	MPG	Minutes per game
FG%	Field goal percentage	3P%	3-point field goal percentage	FT%	Free throw percentage
RPG	Rebounds per game	APG	Assists per game	SPG	Steals per game
BPG	Blocks per game	PPG	Points per game	**Bold**	Career high

=== ABA ===
==== Regular season ====
Year	Team	GP	MPG	FG%	3P%	FT%	RPG	APG	PPG
1967–68	Oakland	77	39.0	.467	.000	.668	12.2	1.8	17.5
