= 1967–68 Minnesota Muskies season =

- Head coach: Jim Pollard
- Arena: Met Center

Results
- Record: 50–28 (.641)
- Place: Division: 2nd (Eastern)
- Playoff finish: Lost in the Eastern Division Finals
- Radio: WLOL

The 1967–68 Minnesota Muskies season was the first and only season of the Muskies in the newly created American Basketball Association. The team was created on February 2, 1967, for the price of $30,000 to L.P. Shields and Fred Jefferson. The team was named after a nickname for the Muskellunge, which is a fish found in Minnesota. The team did well on the court, finishing second to the Pittsburgh Pipers in the Eastern Division. In the playoffs, they made it to the Division Finals, but the Muskies lost in 5 games to the Pipers. However, this proved to be the only season for the Muskies due to them losing money (reportedly $400,000) with middling attendance in relation to minimal season tickets purchased. (In the five playoff games played in Minnesota, they averaged 3,511 in attendance, with the highest being 8,357 for Game 3 of the Division Finals and the lowest being 661 for Game 1 of the Semifinals.) A plan to play 9 games in their following season within other places around Minnesota and a television contract for them were both curtailed, and the Muskies moved to Miami on May 24, 1968 to become the Miami Floridians. However, basketball in Minnesota would not be curtailed for long, as the inaugural champion Pittsburgh Pipers moved to play in the same location in that same season the Muskies moved to Miami to become the Floridians going forward.

== Roster ==
1967–68 Minnesota Muskies roster
Players

Pos.	No.	Player	Height	Weight	DOB	From
PG	23	Dick Clark	6 ft 4 in (1.93 m)	190 lb (86 kg)	January 5, 1944	Eastern Kentucky
C	34	Mel Daniels	6 ft 9 in (2.06 m)	220 lb (100 kg)	July 20, 1944	New Mexico
SG	20	Donnie Freeman	6 ft 3 in (1.91 m)	185 lb (84 kg)	July 18, 1944	Illinois
PF	35	Les Hunter	6 ft 7 in (2.01 m)	210 lb (95 kg)	August 16, 1942	Loyola Chicago
SG	24	Ervin Inniger	6 ft 4 in (1.93 m)	190 lb (86 kg)	January 16, 1945	Indiana
PF	51	Gary Keller	6 ft 9 in (2.06 m)	220 lb (100 kg)	June 13, 1944	Florida
SG	33	Terry Kunze	6 ft 4 in (1.93 m)	210 lb (95 kg)	March 11, 1943	Minnesota
SF	32	Errol Palmer	6 ft 5 in (1.96 m)	195 lb (88 kg)	1945	DePaul
PG	22	Ron Perry	6 ft 3 in (1.91 m)	190 lb (86 kg)	December 29, 1943	Virginia Tech
SF	52	Sam Smith	6 ft 7 in (2.01 m)	230 lb (104 kg)	January 27, 1944	Kentucky Wesleyan
C	50	Skip Thoren	6 ft 10 in (2.08 m)	230 lb (104 kg)	April 5, 1943	Illinois

Coaches
Head coach
- Jim Pollard

Legend
- (DP) Unsigned draft pick
- (FA) Free agent
- (S) Suspended
- Injured

Roster

== Final standings ==
=== Eastern Division ===
Team	W	L	PCT.	GB
Pittsburgh Pipers C	54	24	.692	–
Minnesota Muskies	50	28	.641	4
Indiana Pacers	38	40	.487	16
Kentucky Colonels	36	42	.462	18
New Jersey Americans	36	42	.462	18

== ABA Playoffs ==
ABA Eastern Division Semifinals

Game	Date	Location	Score	Record	Attendance
1	March 24	Minnesota	115–102	1–0	661
2	March 26	Minnesota	95–100	1–1	3,874
3	March 27	Kentucky	116–107	2–1	1,458
4	March 29	Kentucky	86–94	2–2	4,472
5	March 30	Minnesota	114–108	3–2	879

Muskies win series 3–2

ABA Eastern Division Finals

Game	Date	Location	Score	Record	Attendance
1	April 4	Pittsburgh	117–125	0–1	3,159
2	April 6	Pittsburgh	137–123	1–1	2,123
3	April 10	Minnesota	99–107	1–2	8,357
4	April 13	Minnesota	108–117	1–3	3,787
5	April 14	Pittsburgh	105–114	1–4	3,350

Muskies lose series, 4–1

== Awards and honors ==
1968 ABA All-Star Game selections (game played on January 9, 1968)

- Mel Daniels
- Donnie Freeman
- Les Hunter

Jim Pollard was selected to coach the Eastern Division squad.
