= 1964 NBA draft =

Basketball player selection

General information
- Sport: Basketball
- Date: May 4, 1964
- Location: Plaza Hotel (New York City, New York)

Overview
- 101 total selections in 15 rounds
- League: NBA
- Territorial picks: Walt Hazzard, Los Angeles Lakers; George Wilson, Cincinnati Royals
- First selection: Jim Barnes, New York Knicks
- Hall of Famers: 2: F Willis Reed; F Connie Hawkins

The 1964 NBA draft was the 18th annual draft of the National Basketball Association (NBA). The draft was held on May 4, 1964, before the 1964–65 season. In this draft, nine NBA teams took turns selecting amateur U.S. college basketball players. A player who had finished his four-year college eligibility was eligible for selection. If a player left college early, he would not be eligible for selection until his college class graduated. In each round, the teams select in reverse order of their win–loss record in the previous season. Before the draft, a team could forfeit its first-round draft pick and then select any player from within a 50-mile (80 km) radius of its home arena as their territorial pick. The draft consisted of 15 rounds comprising 101 players selected.

== Draft selections and draftee career notes ==
Walt Hazzard and George Wilson were selected as Los Angeles Lakers' and Cincinnati Royals' territorial picks before the draft respectively. Jim Barnes from Texas Western College was selected first overall by the New York Knicks. Willis Reed from Grambling College, who went on to win the Rookie of the Year Award in his first season, was selected eighth overall by the New York Knicks. Reed has been inducted into the Basketball Hall of Fame as a player and was also named in the 50 Greatest Players in NBA History list announced at the league's 50th anniversary in 1996. Reed, who spent all of his 10-year playing career with the Knicks, won the NBA championships twice in 1970 and 1973. In both NBA Finals, he was named the Finals MVP. He also won the Most Valuable Player Award in 1970 and was selected to five All-NBA Teams and seven All-Star Games. He became a head coach after ending his playing career. He coached the Knicks for two seasons and then the New Jersey Nets for two seasons.

Paul Silas, the 10th pick, won three NBA championships, two with the Boston Celtics in 1974 and 1976 and one with the Seattle SuperSonics in 1979. He also had two All-Star Game selections. After his playing career, he coached four NBA teams, most recently with the Charlotte Bobcats (now Charlotte Hornets). Jerry Sloan, the 19th pick, was selected to two All-Star Games in his playing career before becoming a head coach. He coached the Chicago Bulls for three seasons before being fired during the 1981–82 season. He then became the head coach of the Utah Jazz in 1988, the position he held until resigning in early 2011. He has been inducted to the Basketball Hall of Fame as a coach. Hazzard, 2nd pick Joe Caldwell, 4th pick Lucious Jackson and 5th pick Jeff Mullins are the only other players from this draft who have been selected to an All-Star Game. John Thompson, the 25th pick, has also been inducted to the Basketball Hall of Hame as a coach. After finishing his playing career, he became a successful college basketball head coach at Georgetown University. He coached the Georgetown Hoyas for 27 seasons, winning the National Collegiate Athletic Association (NCAA) championship in 1984 and becoming the first African American head coach to win a major collegiate championship. Aside from playing basketball, 12th pick Cotton Nash also played professional baseball in the Major League Baseball (MLB). He played baseball for three seasons in between his basketball career. He is one of only 12 athletes who have played in both NBA and MLB.

Also of note was a player who was officially undrafted in 1964 named Connie Hawkins. While a successful player overall, Hawkins during his freshman year at the University of Iowa back in 1961 was involved with a point shaving scandal. Despite never being convicted of point shaving (with the only involvement being him borrowing $200 by Jack Molinas for school expenses, which he paid back to Jack's brother, Fred Molinas, before the scandal broke out), he was officially kicked out of the team before having a chance to play due to NCAA rules and regulations at the time. Hawkins would later play with the Pittsburgh Rens of the rivaling American Basketball League and the independent Harlem Globetrotters before officially being undrafted in 1964. He became undrafted again in 1965 before being permanently banned from the NBA altogether in 1966. However, Hawkins would sue the NBA for $6 million in damages to his reputation, saying the league banned him unfairly and that they had no substantial evidence linking him to the point shaving scandal of that time. Eventually, the league settled with Hawkins by paying him a settlement of $1.3 million and assigning him to the Phoenix Suns in 1969, effectively removing his permanent ban. While he would only play in the NBA for seven seasons afterwards, his number would be retired by the Suns on November 19, 1976, before being in the Naismith Basketball Hall of Fame in 1992.

== Key ==
Pos.	G	F	C
Position	Guard	Forward	Center

^	Denotes player who has been inducted to the Naismith Memorial Basketball Hall of Fame
^{+}	Denotes player who has been selected for at least one All-Star Game
^{#}	Denotes player who has never appeared in an NBA regular-season or playoff game
^{~}	Denotes player who has been selected as Rookie of the Year

== Draft ==
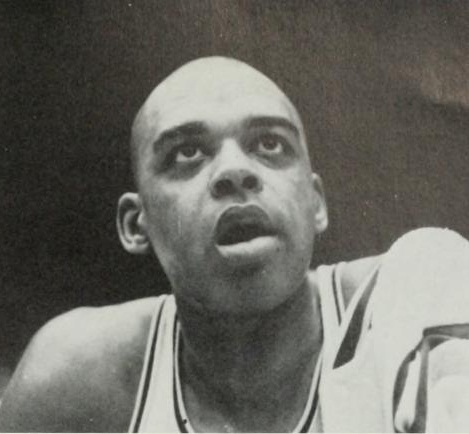
Walt Hazzard was a territorial pick selected by the Los Angeles Lakers.

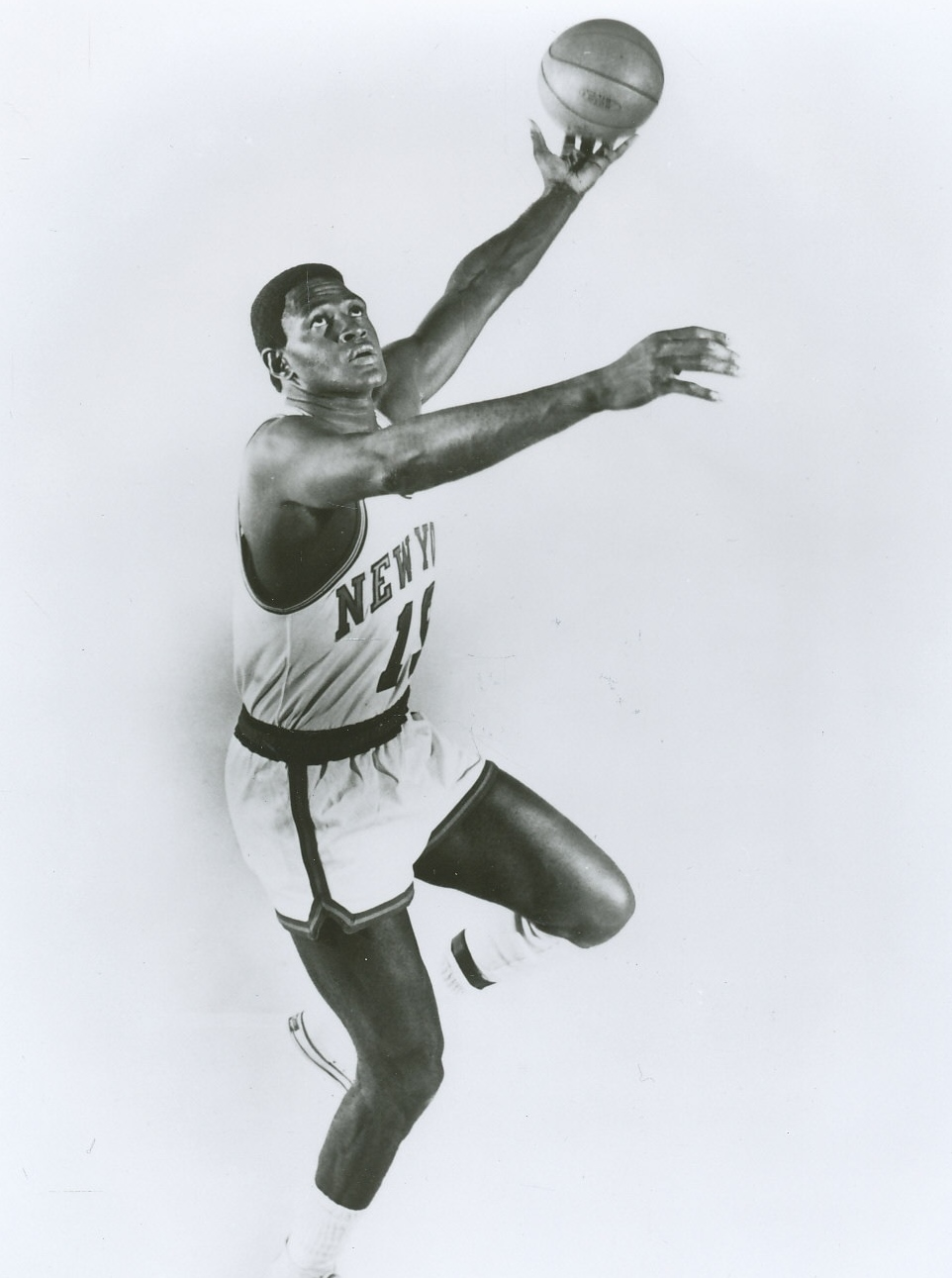
Willis Reed was the 8th pick, selected by the New York Knicks.

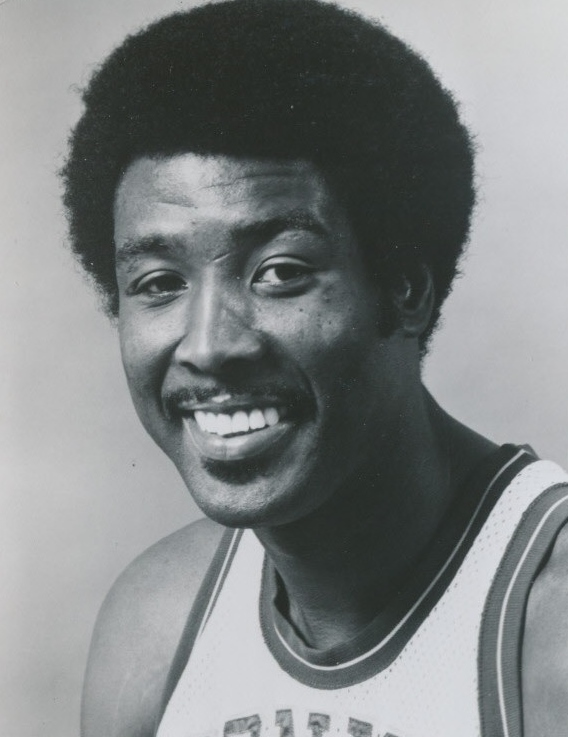
Paul Silas was the 10th pick, selected by the St. Louis Hawks.

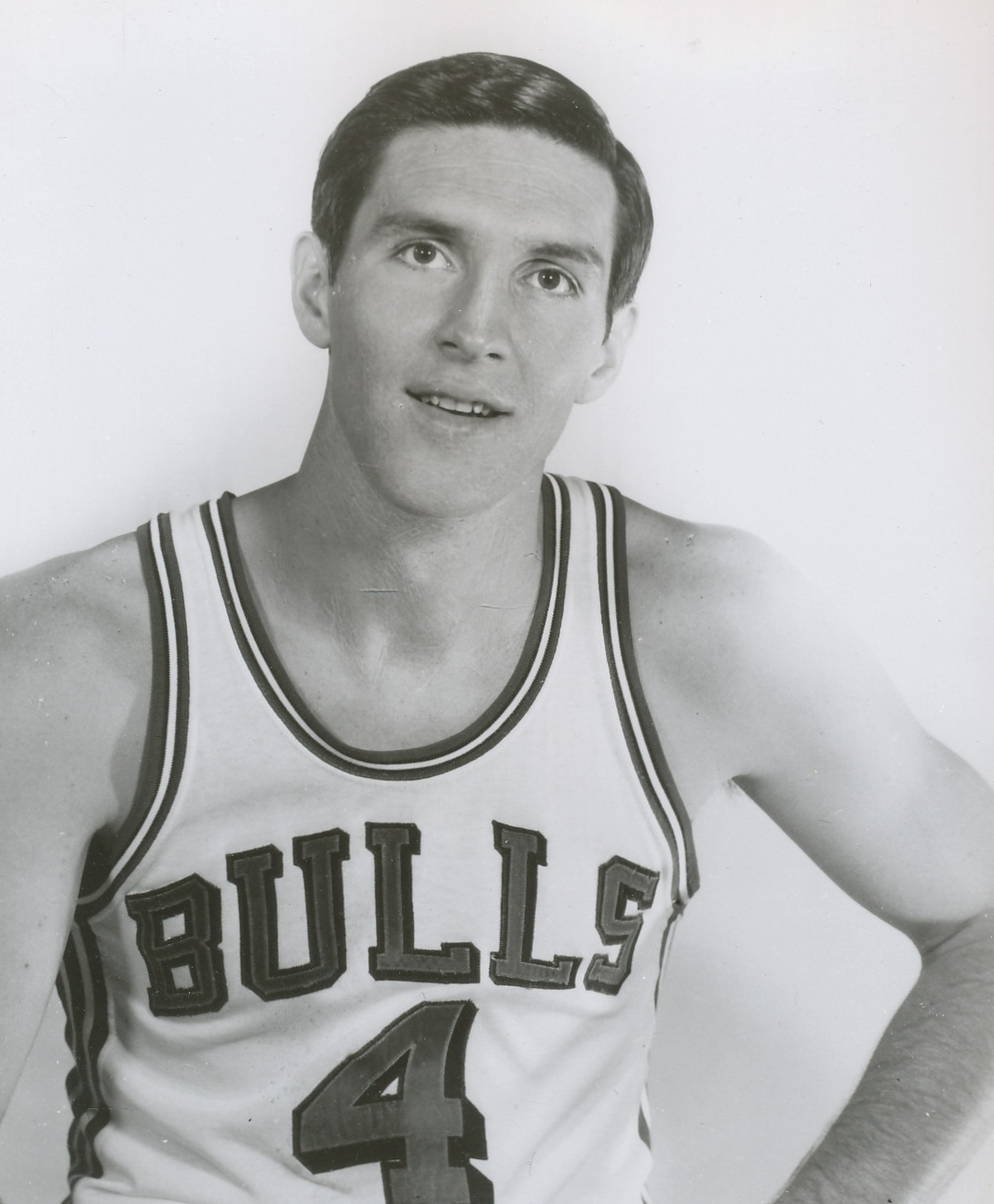
Jerry Sloan was the 19th pick, selected by the Baltimore Bullets.

Rnd.	Pick	Player	Pos.	Nationality (Note: Nationality indicates the player's national team or representative nationality. If a player has not competed at the international level, then the nationality indicates the national team which the player is eligible to represent according to FIBA rules.)	Team	School / club team
T	–	Walt Hazzard^{+}	G	United States	Los Angeles Lakers	UCLA (Sr.)
T	–	George Wilson	C	United States	Cincinnati Royals	Cincinnati (Sr.)
1	1	Jim Barnes	F/C	United States	New York Knicks	Texas Western (Sr.)
1	2	Joe Caldwell^{+}	G/F	United States	Detroit Pistons	Arizona State (Sr.)
1	3	Gary Bradds	F	United States	Baltimore Bullets	Ohio State (Sr.)
1	4	Lucious Jackson^{+}	F/C	United States	Philadelphia 76ers	Pan American (Sr.)
1	5	Jeff Mullins^{+}	G/F	United States	St. Louis Hawks	Duke (Sr.)
1	6	Barry Kramer	G/F	United States	San Francisco Warriors	NYU (Sr.)
1	7	Mel Counts	F/C	United States	Boston Celtics	Oregon State (Sr.)
2	8	Willis Reed^^{~}	F/C	United States	New York Knicks	Grambling (Sr.)
2	9	Les Hunter	F/C	United States	Detroit Pistons	Loyola (IL) (Sr.)
2	10	Paul Silas^{+}	F/C	United States	St. Louis Hawks (from Baltimore)	Creighton (Sr.)
2	11	Ira Harge^{#}	C	United States	Philadelphia 76ers	New Mexico (Sr.)
2	12	Cotton Nash	F	United States	Los Angeles Lakers	Kentucky (Sr.)
2	13	Howard Komives	G	United States	New York Knicks (from St. Louis)^{[a]}	Bowling Green (Sr.)
2	14	Bud Koper	G	United States	San Francisco Warriors	Oklahoma City (Sr.)
2	15	Bill Chmielewski^{#}	C	United States	Cincinnati Royals	Philadelphia Tapers (ABL)
2	16	Ron Bonham	F	United States	Boston Celtics	Cincinnati (Sr.)
3	17	Brian Generalovich^{#}	F	United States	New York Knicks	Pittsburgh (Sr.)
3	18	Wali Jones	G	United States	Detroit Pistons	Villanova (Sr.)
3	19	Jerry Sloan^{^}	G/F	United States	Baltimore Bullets	Evansville (Jr.)
3	20	Larry Jones	G/F	United States	Philadelphia 76ers	Toledo (Sr.)
3	21	Tom Dose^{#}	C	United States	Los Angeles Lakers	Stanford (Sr.)
3	22	Art Becker^{#}	F	United States	St. Louis Hawks	Arizona State (Sr.)
3	23	McCoy McLemore	F/C	United States	San Francisco Warriors	Drake (Sr.)
3	24	Steve Courtin	G	United States	Cincinnati Royals	Saint Joseph's (Sr.)
3	25	John Thompson	F	United States	Boston Celtics	Providence (Sr.)
4	26	Freddie Crawford	G/F	United States	New York Knicks	St. Bonaventure (Sr.)
4	27	Jim Davis	F/C	United States	Detroit Pistons	Colorado (Sr.)
4	28	Pete Spoden^{#}	F	United States	Baltimore Bullets	State College of Iowa (Sr.)
4	29	Frank Corace^{#}	F	United States	Philadelphia 76ers	La Salle (Sr.)
4	30	Hank Finkel	C	United States	Los Angeles Lakers	Dayton (So.)
4	31	Willie Murrell^{#}	F	United States	St. Louis Hawks	Kansas State (Sr.)
4	32	Gene Elmore^{#}	F	United States	San Francisco Warriors	SMU (Sr.)
4	33	Happy Hairston	F	United States	Cincinnati Royals	NYU (Sr.)
4	34	Joe Strawder	C	United States	Boston Celtics	Bradley (Sr.)
5	35	Tony Gennari^{#}	G	United States	New York Knicks	Canisius (Sr.)
5	36	Ray Wolford^{#}	F	United States	Detroit Pistons	Toledo (Sr.)
5	37	Bennie Lenox^{#}	G	United States	Baltimore Bullets	Texas A&M (Sr.)
5	38	Lou Skurcenski^{#}	F	United States	Philadelphia 76ers	Westminster (Pennsylvania) (Sr.)
5	39	John Savage^{#}	F	United States	Los Angeles Lakers	North Texas State (Sr.)
5	40	John Tresvant	F/C	United States	St. Louis Hawks	Seattle (Sr.)
5	41	Roger Suttner^{#}	C	United States	San Francisco Warriors	Kansas State (Sr.)
5	42	George Kirk^{#}	G	United States	Cincinnati Royals	Memphis State (Sr.)
5	43	Nick Werkman^{#}	G	United States	Boston Celtics	Seton Hall (Sr.)
6	44	Tom Lavelle^{#}	C	United States	New York Knicks	Western Carolina (Sr.)
6	45	Larry Phillips^{#}	F	United States	Detroit Pistons	Rice (Sr.)
6	46	Bobby Joe Edmonds^{#}	F	United States	Baltimore Bullets	Tennessee State (Sr.)
6	47	Ricky Kaminsky^{#}	G	United States	Philadelphia 76ers	Yale (Sr.)
6	48	Troy Collier^{#}	F	United States	Los Angeles Lakers	Utah State (Sr.)
6	49	Ernest Brock^{#}	F	United States	St. Louis Hawks	Virginia State (Sr.)
6	50	Ray Carey^{#}	F	United States	San Francisco Warriors	Missouri (Sr.)
6	51	Al Thrasher^{#}	G	United States	Cincinnati Royals	Wittenberg (Sr.)
6	52	Levern Tart^{#}	G	United States	Boston Celtics	Bradley (Sr.)
7	53	Em Bryant	G	United States	New York Knicks	DePaul (Sr.)
7	54	Jerry Jackson^{#}	G	United States	Detroit Pistons	Ohio (Sr.)
7	55	Ron Miller^{#}	G	United States	Baltimore Bullets	Loyola Chicago (Sr.)
7	56	Gordon Hatton^{#}	G	United States	Philadelphia 76ers	Dayton (Sr.)
7	57	Steve Anstett^{#}	F	United States	Los Angeles Lakers	Portland (Sr.)
7	58	Maurice McHartley^{#}	G	United States	St. Louis Hawks	North Carolina A&T (Sr.)
7	59	Dave Lee^{#}	F	United States	San Francisco Warriors	San Francisco (Sr.)
7	60	Vic Rouse^{#}	F	United States	Cincinnati Royals	Loyola Chicago (Sr.)
7	61	Rich Falk^{#}	G	United States	Boston Celtics	Northwestern (Sr.)
8	62	Jim Boutin^{#}	F	United States	New York Knicks	Lewis & Clark (Sr.)
8	63	Ralph Telken^{#}	G	United States	Detroit Pistons	Rockhurst (Sr.)
8	64	Danny Schultz^{#}	G	United States	Baltimore Bullets	Tennessee (Sr.)
8	65	Bob Pelkington^{#}	F	United States	Philadelphia 76ers	Xavier (Sr.)
8	66	Jay Buckley^{#}	C	United States	Los Angeles Lakers	Duke (Sr.)
8	67	Kendall Rhine^{#}	C	United States	St. Louis Hawks	Rice (Sr.)
8	68	Bob Garibaldi^{#}	G	United States	San Francisco Warriors	Santa Clara (Sr.)
8	69	Joe Geiger^{#}	F	United States	Cincinnati Royals	Xavier (Sr.)
8	70	Jeff Blue^{#}	C	United States	Boston Celtics	Butler (Sr.)
9	71	Jack Brens^{#}	F	United States	New York Knicks	Wisconsin (Sr.)
9	72	Tom Black	C	United States	Baltimore Bullets	South Dakota State (Sr.)
9	73	Jim Brennan^{#}	G	United States	Philadelphia 76ers	Clemson (Sr.)
9	74	Darel Carrier^{#}	G	United States	St. Louis Hawks	Western Kentucky (Sr.)
9	75	Camden Wall^{#}	C	United States	San Francisco Warriors	California (Sr.)
9	76	Scotty Pierce^{#}	C	United States	Cincinnati Royals	West Texas State (Sr.)
9	77	Pete Kelley^{#}	G	United States	Boston Celtics	West Virginia Tech (Sr.)
10	78	Jim Christy^{#}	G	United States	New York Knicks	Georgetown (Sr.)
10	79	Bill Kusleika^{#}	G	United States	Baltimore Bullets	Tulsa (Sr.)
10	80	Wylie Briggs^{#}	F	United States	Philadelphia 76ers	North Carolina A&T (Sr.)
10	81	Frank Stephens^{#}	F	United States	St. Louis Hawks	Virginia State (Sr.)
10	82	Jeff Cotwright^{#}	C	United States	San Francisco Warriors	Chapman (Sr.)
10	83	Bob Neumann^{#}	F	United States	Cincinnati Royals	Memphis State (Sr.)
10	84	Duane Corriveau^{#}	G	United States	Boston Celtics	Clark (Sr.)
11	85	Dennis Lynch^{#}	G	United States	New York Knicks	Yale (Sr.)
11	86	Fred Glover^{#}	F	United States	Baltimore Bullets	Winston-Salem State (Sr.)
11	87	Thomas Lowry^{#}	F	United States	Philadelphia 76ers	West Virginia (Sr.)
11	88	Gerald Govan^{#}	C	United States	St. Louis Hawks	St. Mary of the Plains (Sr.)
11	89	Jim Reynolds^{#}	F	United States	Cincinnati Royals	Abilene Christian (Sr.)
12	90	Frank Kamiaski^{#}	F	United States	Baltimore Bullets	Randolph–Macon (Sr.)
12	91	Julius Myers^{#}	C	United States	Philadelphia 76ers	Piratas de Quebradillas (BSN)
12	92	Warren Sutton^{#}	F	United States	St. Louis Hawks	Sir George Williams (Sr.)
12	93	Fred Jones^{#}	G	United States	Cincinnati Royals	Youngstown State (Sr.)
13	94	Doug Moon^{#}	G	United States	Baltimore Bullets	Utah (Sr.)
13	95	Cecil Tuttle^{#}	G	United States	St. Louis Hawks	Georgetown College (Sr.)
14	96	Peter Gent^{#}	G	United States	Baltimore Bullets	Michigan State (Sr.)
14	97	Bill Blair^{#}	G	United States	St. Louis Hawks	VMI (Sr.)
15	98	Sandy Williams^{#}	G	United States	Baltimore Bullets	Saint Francis (Sr.)
15	99	Al Cech^{#}	G	United States	St. Louis Hawks	Detroit (Sr.)

== Notable undrafted players ==
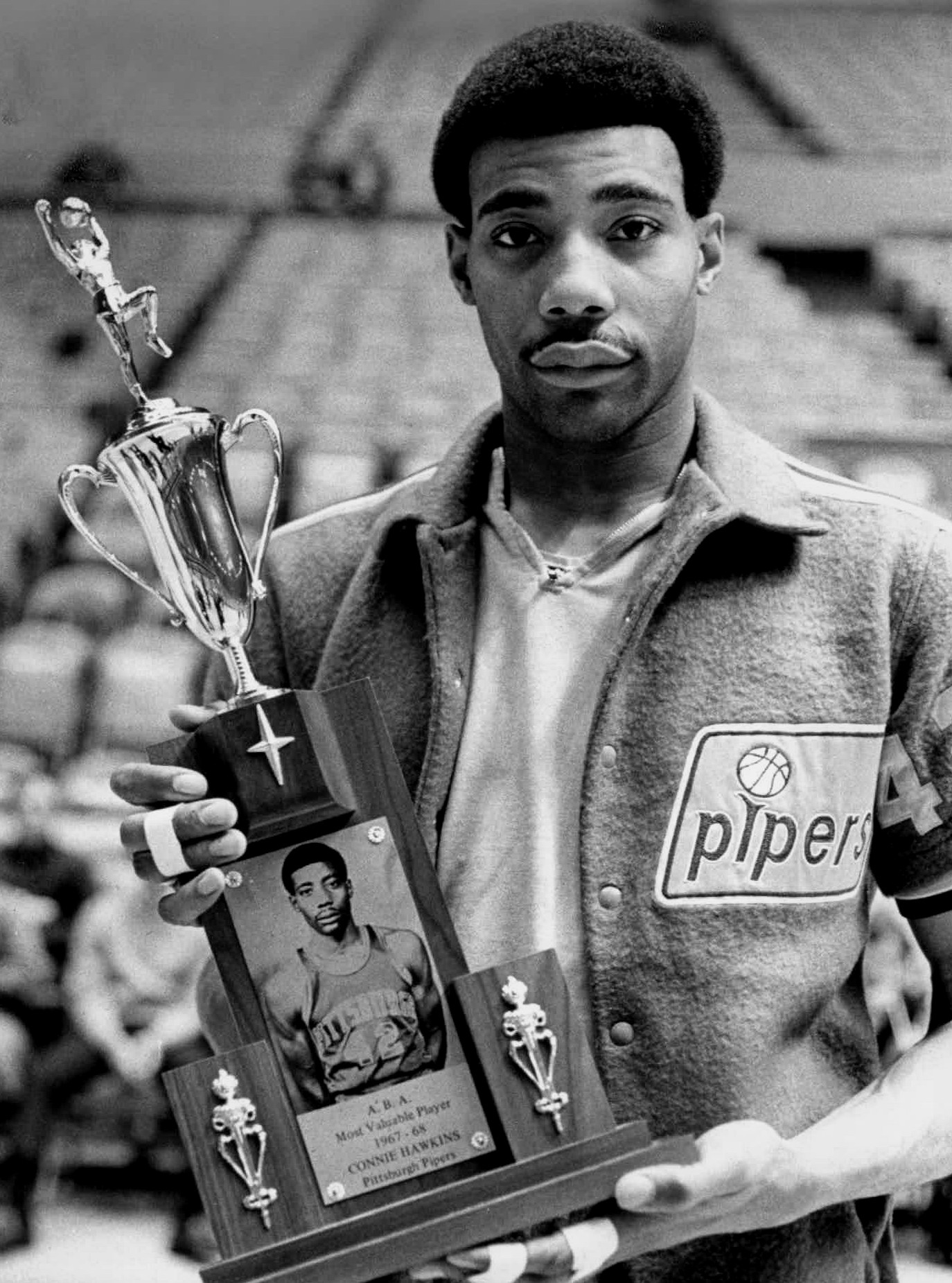
Despite being permanently banned at one point, Connie Hawkins is considered one of the most successful undrafted NBA players of all time.

These players were not selected in the 1964 draft but played at least one game in the NBA.

Player	Pos.	Nationality	School/club team
Connie Hawkins^{^}	F	United States	Harlem Globetrotters
Steve Jones	G	United States	Oregon

== Trades ==
- ^{a} On October 18, 1963, the New York Knicks acquired a second-round pick from the St. Louis Hawks in exchange for Richie Guerin. The Knicks used the pick to draft Howard Komives.

== Notes ==
1: Walt Hazzard changed his name to Mahdi Abdul-Rahman in 1972. However, he retained his birth name throughout his professional career.
2: Bill Chmielewski left college in 1962 after his sophomore year. He then played in the American Basketball League (ABL), before the league folded in 1963.

== See also ==
- List of first overall NBA draft picks
