= Cotton Nash =

American basketball and baseball player (1942–2023)

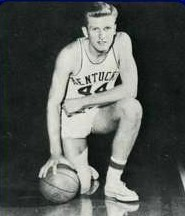
- Nash with the Kentucky Wildcats basketball team

Personal information
- Born: July 24, 1942 Jersey City, New Jersey, U.S.
- Died: May 23, 2023 (aged 80) Lexington, Kentucky, U.S.
- Listed height: 6 ft 5 in (1.96 m)
- Listed weight: 215 lb (98 kg)

Career information
- High school: Lake Charles (Lake Charles, Louisiana)
- College: Kentucky (1961–1964)
- NBA draft: 1964: 2nd round, 12th overall pick
- Drafted by: Los Angeles Lakers
- Playing career: 1964–1968
- Position: Small forward
- Number: 33, 17, 44

Career history
- 1964–1965: Los Angeles Lakers
- 1965: San Francisco Warriors
- 1967–1968: Kentucky Colonels

Career highlights
- Consensus first-team All-American (1964); 2× Consensus second-team All-American (1962, 1963); 3× First-team All-SEC (1962–1964); Third-team Parade All-American (1960)

Career NBA and ABA statistics
- Points: 470 (5.6 ppg)
- Rebounds: 273 (3.3 rpg)
- Assists: 65 (0.8 apg) Baseball career
- First baseman / left fielder
- Batted: Right Threw: Right

MLB debut
- September 1, 1967, for the Chicago White Sox

Last MLB appearance
- October 1, 1970, for the Minnesota Twins

MLB statistics
- Batting average: .188
- Hits: 3
- Strikeouts: 3
- Runs batted in: 2
- Stats at Baseball Reference

Teams
- Chicago White Sox (1967); Minnesota Twins (1969–1970)
- Stats at NBA.com
- Stats at Basketball Reference

Charles Francis "Cotton" Nash (July 24, 1942 – May 23, 2023) was an American professional basketball and baseball player. He played as a forward in the National Basketball Association (NBA) for the Los Angeles Lakers and San Francisco Warriors, and in the American Basketball Association (ABA) for the Kentucky Colonels. He was an outfielder in Major League Baseball (MLB) for the Chicago White Sox and Minnesota Twins.

== Early life ==
Nash was born in Jersey City, New Jersey, on July 24, 1942. His uncle gave him the nickname "Cotton-top" because he was towheaded.

The family moved to Indiana when Nash was 11 years old, and Nash picked up basketball. He attended Jeffersonville High School in Jeffersonville, Indiana. His father was transferred to work in Orange, Texas, and he settled the family in Lake Charles, Louisiana, because the state had more lenient rules on high school sports transfers. Nash attended Lake Charles High School from 1958 to 1960.

== Basketball career ==
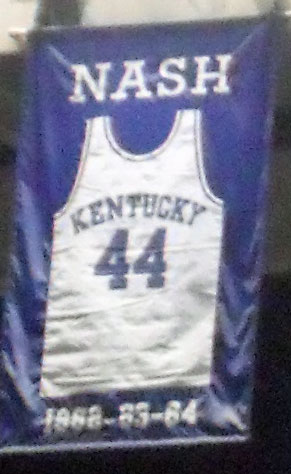
A jersey honoring Nash hangs in Rupp Arena

Nash attended the University of Kentucky, where he played college basketball for the Kentucky Wildcats men's basketball team. He was named to the All-Southeastern Conference three times and was a first-team All-American in 1964. Nash participated in the United States Olympic Trials for the 1964 Summer Olympics, and was selected as an alternate.

The Los Angeles Lakers of the National Basketball Association (NBA) selected Nash in the second round of the 1964 NBA draft. He played for the Lakers until February 1, 1965, when the Lakers acquired Bill McGill and waived Nash. The San Francisco Warriors claimed Nash for the $1,000 waiver price.

Nash played in the American Basketball Association (ABA) with the Kentucky Colonels during the 1967–68 ABA season. He averaged 8.5 points per game, 4.9 rebounds per game, and 1.2 assists per game.

== Baseball career ==
While at the University of Kentucky, Nash also played on the Kentucky baseball team. In 1963, he played collegiate summer baseball with the Cotuit Kettleers of the Cape Cod Baseball League and was named a league all-star.

In May 1964, Nash signed with the Los Angeles Angels and made his professional baseball debut with the Hawaii Islanders of the Pacific Coast League. In August 1967, the Angels traded Nash with cash to the Chicago White Sox for Bill Skowron. The White Sox promoted him to the major leagues on September 1.

During spring training in 1969, the White Sox traded Nash to the Pittsburgh Pirates for Ed Hobaugh. Nash played for the Columbus Jets in the International League that year. Hobaugh retired in June and the White Sox asked for Pittsburgh to return Nash to their farm system. Nash refused to report to the Tucson Toros, and the White Sox traded him to the Minnesota Twins for a player to be named later (later determined to be Jerry Crider). Nash reported to the Denver Bears. The Twins promoted him to the major leagues in September. Late in the 1969 season, the Twins asked Nash to come to spring training as a pitcher in 1970. He played for the Evansville Triplets in 1970, earning another promotion to the major leagues that September.

Nash played for the Portland Beavers in 1971. The Louisville Colonels of the International League acquired Nash from the Twins for Mike Derrick in January 1972. However, the Colonels' acquisition of Cecil Cooper made Nash expendable, and he did not make their final preseason roster cut. He joined Denver during the 1972 season.

== Personal and later life ==
Nash and his wife, Julie Richey, began dating while they attended the University of Kentucky. They married in November 1964 and had three children.

In 1993, Nash was inducted into the Kentucky Athletic Hall of Fame.

=== Death ===
Nash was hospitalized at Baptist Health Hospital in Lexington, Kentucky, and died on May 23, 2023, aged 80, after suffering from ill health since the previous November.

== Career statistics ==
Legend
GP	Games played	GS	Games started	MPG	Minutes per game
FG%	Field goal percentage	3P%	3-point field goal percentage	FT%	Free throw percentage
RPG	Rebounds per game	APG	Assists per game	SPG	Steals per game
BPG	Blocks per game	PPG	Points per game	**Bold**	Career high

=== NBA/ABA ===
==== Regular season ====
Year	Team	GP	MPG	FG%	3P%	FT%	RPG	APG	PPG
1964–65	L.A. Lakers (NBA)	25	6.7	.246		.781	1.4	.4	2.1
1964–65	San Francisco (NBA)	20	9.5	**.375**		**.900**	2.4	.5	4.2
1967–68	Kentucky (ABA)	**39**	**20.2**	.348	.000	.747	**4.9**	**1.2**	**8.5**
Career		84	13.6	.340	.000	.766	3.3	.8	5.6

== See also ==
- List of multi-sport athletes
