= Bennie Lenox =

American basketball player

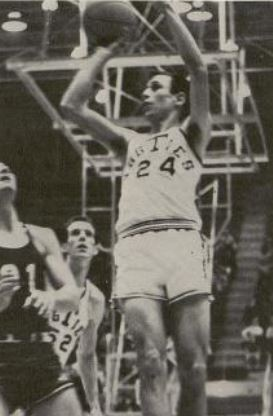
- Lenox playing for Texas A&M in 1964

Personal information
- Born: September 24, 1941 Madisonville, Texas, U.S.
- Died: July 16, 2016 (aged 74) Bertram, Texas, U.S.
- Listed height: 6 ft 2 in (1.88 m)
- Listed weight: 170 lb (77 kg)

Career information
- High school: Clear Creek (League City, Texas)
- College: Texas A&M (1961–1964)
- NBA draft: 1964: 5th round, 37th overall pick
- Drafted by: Baltimore Bullets
- Position: Guard
- Coaching career: 1967–1973

Career history

Coaching
- 1967–1973: Texas (assistant)

Career highlights
- 2× SWC Player of the Year (1963, 1964); 2× First-team All-SWC (1963, 1964)
- Stats at Basketball Reference

Bennie Harold Lenox (September 24, 1941 – July 16, 2016) was an American basketball player. He was best known for his college career at Texas A&M.

Lenox, a 6'2 guard, went to Clear Creek High School, where he set school scoring records for points in a game (46) and season (1,051 in his senior season). At Texas A&M, Lenox became the centerpiece of the Aggies offense as a junior and senior. In his junior season, he averaged 23.7 points per game for the Aggies and was named first-team All-Southwest Conference (SWC) and the league's player of the year.

As a senior, Lenox starred for new coach Shelby Metcalf as the Aggies won the SWC and advanced to the 1964 NCAA Tournament. Lenox averaged 20.8 points per game and set the SWC single-game scoring record in his senior year in a match-up against Wyoming (53 points). The record will never be broken, as the conference disbanded in 1996. At the close of the season, he was again named first-team All-SWC and repeated as SWC Player of the Year.

Following the close of his college career, Lenox was drafted by the Baltimore Bullets in the fifth round of the 1964 NBA draft (37th pick overall), however he did not play in the NBA. In 1967, Lenox was hired as an assistant basketball coach at the Aggies' rival, the University of Texas. He left the post in 1973 to enter private business.

Lenox died in his Bertram, Texas home at the age of 74.
