= Maurice McHartley =

American basketball player (born 1942)

Personal information
- Born: August 1, 1942 (age 84) Detroit, Michigan, U.S.
- Listed height: 6 ft 3 in (1.91 m)
- Listed weight: 185 lb (84 kg)

Career information
- High school: Central (Detroit, Michigan)
- College: North Carolina A&T (1961–1964)
- NBA draft: 1964: 7th round, 58th overall pick
- Drafted by: St. Louis Hawks
- Playing career: 1964–1971
- Position: Point guard / shooting guard
- Number: 12, 22, 34

Career history
- 1964–1967: Wilmington Blue Bombers
- 1967–1968: New York Nets
- 1968–1969: Dallas Chaparrals
- 1969: Miami Floridians
- 1969–1970: Pittsburgh Pipers
- 1970: Dallas Chaparrals
- 1970–1971: Delaware Blue Bombers

Career highlights
- 2× EPBL champion (1966, 1967); All-EPBL Second Team (1967)
- Stats at Basketball Reference

Maurice Franklin McHartley (born August 1, 1942) is an American former professional basketball player. He played in the Eastern Professional Basketball League (EPBL) / Eastern Basketball Association (EBA) and American Basketball Association for a number of teams between 1964 and 1971. He won two EPBL championships while playing for the Wilmington Blue Bombers in 1966 and 1967. McHartley was selected to the All-EPBL Second Team in 1967.
