= Willie Murrell =

American basketball player (1941–2018)

Personal information
- Born: September 13, 1941 Taft, Oklahoma, U.S.
- Died: December 6, 2018 (aged 77) Denver, Colorado, U.S.
- Listed height: 6 ft 6 in (1.98 m)
- Listed weight: 225 lb (102 kg)

Career information
- High school: Moton (Taft, Oklahoma)
- College: Eastern Oklahoma State (1960–1962); Kansas State (1962–1964)
- NBA draft: 1964: 4th round, 31st overall pick
- Drafted by: St. Louis Hawks
- Playing career: 1964–1971
- Position: Small forward
- Number: 44

Career history
- 1965–1967: Scranton Miners
- 1967–1968: Denver Rockets
- 1968–1970: Miami Floridians
- 1970: Kentucky Colonels
- 1970–1971: Scranton Apollos

Career highlights
- EPBL Most Valuable Player (1967); All-EPBL First Team (1967); All-EPBL Second Team (1966); 2× First-team All-Big Eight (1963, 1964); Honorable mention AP All-American (1964); No. 44 Jersey retired by Kansas State Wildcats

Career ABA statistics
- Points: 2,988 (13.1 ppg)
- Rebounds: 1,655 (7.3 rpg)
- Assists: 233 (1.0 apg)
- Stats at Basketball Reference

Willie Vernon Murrell (September 13, 1941 – December 6, 2018) was an American professional basketball player.

Murrell was born in Taft, Oklahoma. A 6'6" forward, he played at Kansas State University from 1962 to 1964. He averaged 20.6 points and 10.7 rebounds per game during his time at Kansas State and was a 1964 All-American AP Honorable Mention. In 1964, he led Kansas State to the Final Four of the NCAA Tournament. The team was eliminated by UCLA, despite a 29-point, 13-rebound effort from Murrell. In 2009, Murrell's No. 44 jersey was retired by Kansas State.

After college, Murrell played three seasons in the American Basketball Association as a member of the Denver Rockets, Miami Floridians, and Kentucky Colonels. He averaged 13.1 points and 7.3 rebounds in 228 ABA games.

Murrell played two seasons with the Scranton Miners in the Eastern Professional Basketball League (EPBL) from 1965 to 1967 and returned to the team when they were renamed to the Apollos in the Eastern Basketball Association (EBA) in the 1970–71 season. He was selected as the EPBL Most Valuable Player and a member of the All-EPBL First Team in 1967 and named to the All-EPBL Second Team in 1966.

Murrell died on December 6, 2018, at age 77 in Denver, Colorado.
