= Don Sidle =

American basketball player

Personal information
- Born: June 21, 1946 Dallas, Texas, U.S.
- Died: May 25, 1987 (aged 40)
- Listed height: 6 ft 8 in (2.03 m)
- Listed weight: 215 lb (98 kg)

Career information
- High school: Booker T. Washington (Dallas, Texas)
- College: Oklahoma (1965–1968)
- NBA draft: 1968: 3rd round, 39th overall pick
- Drafted by: San Francisco Warriors
- Playing career: 1968–1972
- Position: Power forward / center
- Number: 33, 22

Career history
- 1968–1970: Miami Floridians
- 1970–1971: Denver Rockets
- 1971: Indiana Pacers
- 1971–1972: Memphis Pros

Career highlights
- 2× First-team All-Big Eight (1967, 1968)
- Stats at Basketball Reference

Donald Roy Sidle (June 21, 1946 – May 25, 1987) was an American professional basketball player.

A 6'8" forward/center, Sidle played at the University of Oklahoma from 1965 to 1968. He was an All-American in 1967 and 1968, after seasons in which he averaged 23.7 points and 19.8 points per game, respectively.

Sidle was selected by the San Francisco Warriors with the 29th pick of the 1968 NBA draft, but he spent his professional career in the American Basketball Association as a member of the Miami Floridians, Denver Rockets, Indiana Pacers, and Memphis Pros. Over four seasons (1968–1972) he averaged 13.5 points and 8.0 rebounds per game. He ranked eighth in the ABA in rebounds per game (12.9) and seventh in total rebounds (1,082) during the 1969-70 ABA season.
