= Ira Harge =

American basketball player (born 1941)

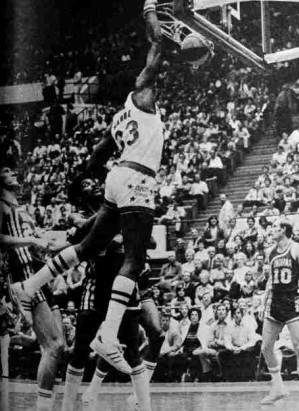
- Harge as a member of the Utah Stars, circa 1972

Personal information
- Born: March 14, 1941 (age 85) Anguilla, Mississippi, U.S.
- Listed height: 6 ft 9 in (2.06 m)
- Listed weight: 225 lb (102 kg)

Career information
- High school: Northeastern (Detroit, Michigan)
- College: Burlington JC (1960–1962); New Mexico (1962–1964)
- NBA draft: 1964: 2nd round, 11th overall pick
- Drafted by: Philadelphia 76ers
- Playing career: 1967–1973
- Position: Center
- Number: 30, 33, 41

Career history
- 1967–1968: Pittsburgh Pipers
- 1968–1970: Oakland Oaks / Washington Caps
- 1970: Carolina Cougars
- 1971–1972: The Floridians
- 1972, 1972: Utah Stars
- 1972: Carolina Cougars

Career highlights
- ABA champion (1969); 2× First-team All-WAC (1963, 1964)

Career ABA statistics
- Points: 4,396 (10.3 ppg)
- Rebounds: 4,955 (11.6 rpg)
- Assists: 736 (1.7 apg)
- Stats at Basketball Reference

Ira Lee Harge (born March 14, 1941) is an American former professional basketball player. Born in Anguilla, Mississippi, Harge played high school basketball in Detroit, Michigan before starring in college at the University of New Mexico. He played professionally in the American Basketball Association for six seasons, playing on two ABA championship teams. Harge earned a master's degree in education from UNM in 1969 and became a coach and teacher in Albuquerque after his playing career ended.

== College career ==
=== Burlington Junior College ===
Harge initially enrolled at Bowling Green but was forced to cut short his freshman year and return home when his father became ill. He then went to Burlington Junior College in Iowa, where he was named a Juco All-American as a freshman after averaging 31 points and 21 rebounds a game. He averaged 39 a game in the JC national championship tournament, including a high game of 47 points. He averaged 26.4 a game as a sophomore, leading Burlington to a conference title.

=== University of New Mexico ===
Harge transferred as a junior to New Mexico in 1962 to play for new Lobo coach Bob King, and together they would transform the program over the next two years. The Lobos had been dismal during the previous eight seasons, going 42–149 (.220). During their two seasons with Harge, the Lobos went 39–15 (.722), becoming a nationally ranked NIT finalist and setting the table for the continued success of the UNM program.

In 1962–63, the Lobos began the season 9–2, including wins over Texas Tech and at rival New Mexico State. They were 14–4 before losing five straight WAC conference games, four of those on the road. They finished the season 16–9, the best Lobo record in seventeen years. Harge led the team, averaging 21.1 points and 13.2 rebounds a game, setting then-Lobo records for points and rebounds in a season. Harge also spearheaded a defense that gave up fewer than 58 points a game on the season, and the team's success led to the first sell out of a Lobo home game.

== Professional career ==
Harge was selected with the 4th pick in the 2nd round (11th overall) in the 1964 NBA draft by the Philadelphia 76ers. Previously, in 1963, he was also selected with the 4th pick, but in the 7th round (57th overall) by the Detroit Pistons. But Harge opted to play professionally in the American Basketball Association.

Harge played six seasons (1967–1973) in the ABA as a member of the Pittsburgh Pipers (1967–68), Oakland Oaks / Washington Caps (1968–1970), Carolina Cougars (1970–1971 and 1973), The Floridians (1971–1972), and the Utah Stars (1971–1973). He played on the Pittsburgh Pipers team that won the 1968 ABA Championship, and he won the 1969 ABA Championship with the Oakland Oaks. Harge maintained a double-double average (10.3 points, 11.6 rebounds) over the course of his ABA career and ranks tenth on the ABA's all-time list for total rebounds (4,955).

== Post-playing career ==
Harge earned a degree from UNM in education and coached and taught in the Albuquerque Public School system from 1965 to 1967, before returning to basketball. While he was playing in the ABA, he completed a master's degree in education at UNM. After his playing career ended, he returned to reside in Albuquerque.

In 1986, Harge was inducted into the New Mexico Sports Hall of Fame, and in 1993 he was inducted into the UNM Athletics Hall of Honor.

== Career statistics ==
Legend
GP	Games played	GS	Games started	MPG	Minutes per game
FG%	Field goal percentage	3P%	3-point field goal percentage	FT%	Free throw percentage
RPG	Rebounds per game	APG	Assists per game	SPG	Steals per game
BPG	Blocks per game	PPG	Points per game	**Bold**	Career high
*	Led the league

†	Denotes seasons in which Williams's team won an ABA championship

=== ABA ===
==== Regular season ====
Year	Team	GP	MPG	FG%	3P%	FT%	RPG	APG	PPG
1967–68	Pittsburgh	52*	31.8	.399	–	.647	11.4	.7	9.1
1967–68	Oakland	30*	34.9	.397	–	.728	**14.8**	2.0	11.8
1968–69†	Oakland	78	26.9	.465	–	.615	10.5	1.2	8.5
1969–70	Washington	**84***	35.6	.468	–	.678	14.0	2.4	12.2
1970–71	Carolina	29	30.8	.453	.000	.512	11.7	2.0	10.5
1970–71	Florida	53	**38.5**	.463	**.500**	.692	14.1	**2.7**	**15.4**
1971–72	Florida	53	34.1	.456	.000	.683	11.8	1.9	11.2
1971–72	Utah	31	14.7	**.492**	–	**.741**	5.0	1.0	4.4
1972–73	Utah	13	7.7	.409	–	.667	2.8	.5	1.7
1972–73	Carolina	4	19.3	.278	–	.500	5.8	.8	3.0
Career		427	30.8	.450	.333	.661	11.6	1.7	10.3

==== Playoffs ====
Year	Team	GP	MPG	FG%	3P%	FT%	RPG	APG	PPG
1969†	Oakland	**16**	27.8	.417	–	.615	12.0	1.3	7.1
1970	Washington	7	38.1	.448	.000	.611	13.6	**2.7**	10.1
1971	Florida	6	**38.8**	**.561**	.000	.579	**16.3**	2.0	**17.2**
1972	Utah	10	10.6	.440	–	**.714**	4.0	.8	2.7
Career		39	26.9	.468	.000	.614	10.9	1.6	8.1

=== College ===
Year	Team	GP	GS	MPG	FG%	3P%	FT%	RPG	APG	SPG	BPG	PPG
1962–63	New Mexico	25	25		**.541**		.631	**13.2**				**21.1**
1963–64	New Mexico	**29**	**29**		.432		**.649**	10.5				16.8
**Career**		54	54		.484		.640	11.8				18.8
