= Oakland Oaks (ABA) =

- Conference: None
- Division: Western Division
- Founded: 1967
- History: Oakland Oaks; 1967–1969; Washington Caps; 1969–1970; Virginia Squires; 1970–1976
- Arena: Oakland–Alameda County Coliseum Arena
- Location: Oakland, California
- Team colors: Green and Yellow
- Head coach: Bruce Hale (1967–1968); Alex Hannum (1968–1969)
- Ownership: Pat Boone; S. Kenneth Davidson; Dennis A. Murphy
- Championships: 1 (1969)
- Division titles: 1 (1969)

The Oakland Oaks were a charter member of the original American Basketball Association (ABA) and the first West Coast basketball team to win a major professional championship. Formed in February 1967, the team played in the ABA during the 1967–68 and 1968–69 seasons at the Oakland–Alameda County Coliseum Arena. The team colors were green and gold.

On February 2, 1967, longtime entertainer and business entrepreneur Pat Boone, S. Kenneth Davidson, and Dennis A. Murphy (who would later co-found the World Hockey Association) were awarded a team in exchange for $30,000. Initially, Boone received a 10 percent share of the franchise to serve as president, but he had limited involvement in team operations and rarely attended home games because of his outside interests.

An earlier Oakland Oaks basketball team played in the American Basketball League in 1962, along with a baseball team that had played for nearly a half century in Oakland, with the latter and the ABA Oaks both using the oak tree and the acorn on their logos.

== Beginnings ==
It was the Oaks who played the inaugural ABA game against the Anaheim Amigos, defeating them 134–129 in front of 4,828 fans at home on October 13, 1967.

The team had widely varying performances in its two years of existence. In their first season, the Oaks finished 22–56 and had the second-worst performance of any professional basketball team ever in a major league, of 1485 such team-seasons (through 2015, according to the Elo rating system); only the 1946–1947 Pittsburgh Ironmen had a worse year.

They were probably noted more for a major contract dispute with the cross-bay San Francisco Warriors of the established National Basketball Association (NBA) over the rights to superstar player Rick Barry than for any on-court accomplishments. Barry, a former NBA Rookie of the Year who led the Warriors to the NBA Finals in 1966–67, was so frustrated by team management's failure to pay him certain incentive awards that he sat out the 1967–68 season. He joined the Oaks the following year, leading the franchise to the ABA championship in 1968–69.

== The first and last great year ==
The road to the championship was led by pioneering owner, S. Kenneth Davidson, who aggressively pursued Barry and one-time Warriors head coach Alex Hannum, signing them for an unprecedented $85,000 per year. His efforts drove a historic turnaround from last place to first in one year. Unfortunately for Barry, he tore ligaments in his knee after colliding with Ken Wilburn late in a game versus the New York Nets on December 27, 1968. He tried to return in January, but only aggravated the injury and subsequently sat out the rest of the season, only appearing in 35 games as a result. Regardless, the Oaks won 60 games during the season.

In the playoffs, the Oaks outlasted the Denver Rockets in seven games in the semifinals, then swept the New Orleans Buccaneers in the Division Finals to advance to the ABA Finals versus the Indiana Pacers. After a split of the first two games, the Oaks won an overtime thriller 134–126 to take a 2–1 lead in the series. They then won the fourth game to set up a clinching opportunity in Oakland. In Game 5, the Oaks won 135–131 in overtime to clinch the series and league title. Warren Jabali was named playoffs MVP on the strength of 21.5 points and 9.7 rebounds per game in the postseason. In the nine playoff games in Oakland, the Oaks averaged just 3,401 attendance a game (30,615 total). The highest came in Game 5 of the Finals, when 6,340 were on hand.

== Demise ==
With or without Barry, the team proved to be a poor investment for Boone, who became majority owner after Davidson left the group. Despite winning the ABA championship, the Oaks were a failure at the box office, due in large part to the proximity of the NBA Warriors nearby. Not only that, but it was also revealed in the book Loose Balls that the championship ring the Oaks got to commemorate their championship run accidentally led to the bank that was supposed to help finance the rings result in a blank check being written out in an amount to $1.5 million being spent. As a result of this combination, the team was sold to Earl Foreman and moved to Washington, D.C., for the 1969–70 season, where it was renamed the Washington Caps.

After one season in the nation's capital, the franchise moved to Norfolk, Virginia, for the 1970–71 season and became the Virginia Squires. The team disbanded after the 1975–76 season, keeping it out of the ABA–NBA merger which occurred just one month after their folding.

== Basketball Hall of Famers ==
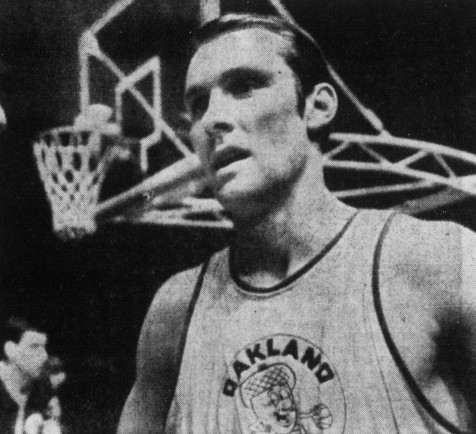
Rick Barry in an Oakland Oaks uniform

Oakland Oaks Hall of Famers
Players
No.	Name	Position	Tenure	Inducted
24	Rick Barry	F	1968–1969	1987
11	Larry Brown ^{1}	G	1968–1969	2002
Coaches
Name		Position	Tenure	Inducted
Alex Hannum		Head coach	1968–1969	1998

Notes:

- ^{1} Inducted as a coach.

== Seasons ==
Season	League	Division	Finish	W	L	Win%	Playoffs	Awards
Oakland Oaks
1967–68	ABA	Western	6th	22	56	.282	Did not qualify	
1968–69	ABA	Western	1st	60	18	.769	Won Division Semifinals (Rockets) 4–3; Won Division Finals (Buccaneers) 4–0; Won ABA Finals (Pacers) 4–1	Warren Jabali (ABA ROY, Playoffs MVP)
