= American Basketball Association draft =

The American Basketball Association draft was held from 1967 to 1975. Generally speaking, the ABA's drafts were considered a lot looser in terms of structure for teams to make their player choices when compared to the rivaling NBA. So much so, in fact, that in 1973, the ABA would host four different drafts that essentially held the same type of purpose at various different points of the year, while in 1974, the ABA would not only host a draft for college-based players, but also a draft for NBA players to be taken by ABA teams as well. In addition to that, according to former Washington Caps and Virginia Squires head coach Al Bianchi, the ABA would host their drafts on the drop of a hat and if a team wanted someone even after their draft was officially over and done with, they'd put him on their draft list anyway, which would later influence the rivaling NBA draft system during the 1970s decade. Due to the secretive nature of the league's early drafts alongside their looser structures, not much is known about the draft records of where certain players were selected in which round early on outside of who the #1 pick of each draft was. It wouldn't be until 1971 where the ABA would list out a proper ordering of rounds and teams in the draft systems they had, and even then, the ABA did not officially list out a proper draft list selection ordering of the 1972 draft for the first five rounds in particular, while the league showcased extra draft gimmicks in 1973 and 1974 alongside the actual ABA drafts done before having a simple draft similar to the NBA draft again (albeit with a bonus round added for two teams via outside circumstances) in 1975.

== First overall picks ==
Year	Team	Player	Position	College
1967	Indiana Pacers	Jimmy Walker	Shooting Guard	Providence Friars
1968	Houston Mavericks	Elvin Hayes	Power Forward/Center	Houston Cougars
1969	New York Nets	Lew Alcindor	Center	UCLA Bruins
1970	New York Nets	Bob Lanier (Note: Bob Lanier is officially considered the #1 pick of the 1970 ABA draft, but he is officially considered a territorial selection by the ABA due to the Nets moving up from their initial #6 slot to declare territorial rights on him. If we exclude that, the proper #1 pick that year would be Pete Maravich of the Louisiana State University Tigers by the Carolina Cougars instead.)	Center	St. Bonaventure Bonnies
1971	Utah Stars	Jim McDaniels	Power Forward/Center	Western Kentucky Hilltoppers
1972	Virginia Squires	Bob McAdoo	Center/Power Forward	North Carolina Tar Heels
1973	San Diego Conquistadors	Dwight Lamar (Note: This pick was the #1 pick for what was considered the 1973 ABA Senior Draft (the official version of the main ABA draft that year), not the 1973 Special Circumstances Draft that happened months before the Senior Draft, the 1973 ABA Undergraduate Draft that was directly after the Senior Draft that officially connected to that aforementioned draft once the prior Senior Draft was done with, or even the 1973 Supplemental Draft that was done some time afterward that incidentally had more rounds by comparison to the other drafts that were done during that year.)	Point Guard	Southwestern Louisiana Ragin' Cajuns
1974	Virginia Squires	Tom McMillen (Note: This pick was the #1 pick for the regular 1974 ABA Draft, not the subsequent 1974 ABA Draft of NBA Players.)	Power Forward/Center	Maryland Terrapins
1975	Denver Nuggets	Marvin Webster (Note: Marvin Webster is officially considered the #1 pick of the 1975 ABA draft, but his bonus round selection by the ABA (which happened due to the Spirits of St. Louis taking one of Denver's players away from them) sometimes gets confused as a final round selection instead. As such, if we exclude that, the proper #1 pick this year would be David Thompson of the North Carolina State University Wolfpack by the Virginia Squires instead.)	Center	Morgan State Bears

== Drafts ==
=== 1967 ABA draft ===
No known record of which player was taken in which round outside of Jimmy Walker as the #1 pick by the Indiana Pacers was kept throughout the ABA's inaugural draft history. The reason for this related to this draft being held in secret at the end of the league's three day long meetings held in Oakland, California on April 2, 1967. What is known, however, was that the Indiana Pacers won the first ever ABA draft lottery and would select the #1 pick in the process, with the second round being reversed in draft order, followed by a new draft lottery (alongside territorial picks in mind) for the third round, with the fourth round being reversed in order of what the third round would become, and then subsequent odd-numbered rounds being done in a newly randomized rounding order and subsequent even-numbered rounds resulting in the reversal of that previous round's ordering in question. What's also confirmed was that 130 players were drafted during twelve rounds of the 1967 ABA draft. Likewise, the New Orleans Buccaneers would be the first team to complete a draft day trade with the Oakland Oaks, as well as select multi-athlete players in Bob Seagren and Ron Widby that year. This year also saw three of the ABA's teams participate under what would ultimately become tentative names during the drafting process, with the Denver Rockets (now Denver Nuggets) initially going by the name of the Denver Larks (and at one point, the Denver Lark Buntings was considered as an extension to the original team name in mind) after already moving the previously planned Kansas City, Missouri based ABA team out to Denver before the draft began before new ownership changed the team name to subsequently save their franchise and coincide with the business the owners ran alongside the team at the time, the New Jersey Americans (now Brooklyn Nets) initially going by the New Jersey Freighters (or even New York Freighters in reference to one of the team owner's businesses that he helped run in Manhattan at the time) before later deciding to first become the New York Americans and then the New Jersey Americans by the time their first season began after failing to utilize a proper long-term home in the New York City area at the time, and the Oakland Oaks would originally go by the Oakland Americans before a dispute with the New Jersey later turned New York franchise led to them considering the Oakland Jacks name (in honor of Jack London) before ultimately going with the Oakland Oaks partially as a homage to the previous incarnation of the team name held in the second version of the American Basketball League, but was really more considered a homage to the Pacific Coast League baseball team of the same name instead.

=== 1968 ABA draft ===
No known record of which player was taken in which round outside of Elvin Hayes as the #1 pick by the Houston Mavericks was kept throughout the ABA's second ever draft. The reason why this would be the case was due to it being held in secret, with an evaluation draft being conducted on March 9 in Louisville, Kentucky, followed by two different drafts of similar nature occurring on April 27 & May 5 in Los Angeles and Minneapolis respectively. During this specific draft, the Anaheim Amigos would move to Los Angeles and become the Los Angeles Stars, with the Stars retaining all of the Amigos' draft rights and team history from the previous season once they entered the April portion of the 1968 ABA draft. This draft year also increased the number of rounds that was had for most teams, with the draft going up to 15 rounds for most teams, with some teams utilizing at least one additional round as well (with the Amigos turned Stars using two additional rounds in their case). As such, the number of selections increased from last year's draft to this year's draft going forward with about 167 total selections made.

=== 1969 ABA draft ===
No known record of which player was taken in which round, outside of Lew Alcindor (now Kareem Abdul-Jabbar) as the #1 pick by the New York Nets and Neal Walk as the #2 pick by the Houston Mavericks (mirroring the selections made in the 1969 NBA draft by the former NBA expansion teams in the Milwaukee Bucks and Phoenix Suns that year, respectively) under what was dubbed as "Operation Kingfish" at the time, was kept throughout the ABA's third ever draft. The reason why that would be the case was because the ABA would host the first five rounds secretly on February 15 in Bloomington, Minnesota, with the following five rounds after that being completed on April 15 in Charlotte, North Carolina. Additional rounds would be implemented later on for most teams similar to last year's draft, but a total of 10 official rounds with every team was completed that draft year, meaning a fewer number of draft selections were made in this year's draft. Similar to last year's ABA draft, one ABA teams would relocate and rebrand themselves immediately in-between areas of the draft, with the previously mentioned Houston Mavericks moving to the state of North Carolina to play more as a regional franchise as the Carolina Cougars, with the Cougars retaining all of the Houston Mavericks' draft rights and team history from the previous two seasons, similar to the Los Angeles Stars retaining the history of the Anaheim Amigos after one season of play. Following the repeated failures of persuading talented star players like Lew Alcindor to choose the ABA over the rivaling NBA, George Mikan would effectively resign from his position as commissioner of the ABA, with other changes being made in the ABA during that period of time as well, including the undrafted signing of sophomore Spencer Haywood for the Denver Rockets, which later caused significant changes in the world of sports drafting thanks to the Haywood v. National Basketball Association Supreme Court case.

=== 1970 ABA draft ===
No known record of which player was taken in which round outside of Bob Lanier as the #1 territorial pick of the New York Nets and Pete Maravich as the unofficial #1 pick of the Carolina Cougars was kept throughout the ABA's fourth ever draft. However, unlike the other early drafts in ABA history, the 1970 ABA draft did at least record the first three rounds' draft round ordering and draft prospect placements by comparison to the earlier drafts done during the 1960s decade, though the rest of the rounds did not specify the proper ordering of the other players in the other rounds by comparison. Despite that point, the ABA would hold this draft's first eight rounds at its earliest date yet on January 22 in Indianapolis, while the second half of the draft (which would go from rounds 9-17 this year) would be held on March 15 in New York. This draft would see the ABA become more successful in persuading young talents to join the ABA instead of the rivaling NBA, to the point where ABA-NBA merger talks were first planned to begin after this draft concluded, though these initial plans ultimately fell short of success by the following year. This post-draft period also saw the most number of teams revamping themselves to start their upcoming season, with over half of the ABA's teams either moving elsewhere and/or revamping their team names into something new entirely.

=== 1971 ABA draft ===
This draft would be the first ABA draft to have a known record of who got selected where in the ABA beyond just the fact that Jim McDaniels was the #1 pick this year by the Utah Stars from a prior trade with the Texas Chaparrals (though he wouldn't play for either team during his ABA career, despite being named an ABA All-Star in his rookie season) in their only season under that name. Not only that, the ABA would host the most rounds ever by this point in time with a grand total of 20 rounds officially being set this year. The first three rounds would be completed on January 22–23 at Greensboro, North Carolina, while the rest of the rounds starting from the fourth round onward would be completed on March 15 in New York. This draft was also notable for not just having the biggest successes in league history (having more Hall of Fame worthy players coming out of the draft period than the NBA did during this particular year, with the NBA's notable Hall of Famers from the 1971 NBA draft year previously playing for the ABA first, as well as two major successful undrafted underclassmen in George McGinnis and Julius Erving), but also for having the last selection of this particular draft be a prank selection by the Indiana Pacers with them selecting a guy named "Slick Pinkham", which was a gag name that was also a portmanteau of their (at the time) head coach Bobby "Slick" Leonard and team owner Dick Tinkham, the latter of whom actually did attend DePauw University. The ABA would also host a "Special Circumstances" Draft later in the year on September 10 in Memphis, Tennessee (the final draft event the ABA ever held in a place that wouldn't be in New York for the rest of its existence) as a response to the (at the time) recently implemented "NBA Hardship Draft" that the NBA was forced to utilize following the results of the Haywood v. National Basketball Association 1971 Supreme Court case, but only three players from that draft would be selected there: Duquesne University's Mickey Davis for the Denver Rockets, the University of California, Berkeley's Phil Chenier for the Carolina Cougars, and North Carolina State University's Ed Leftwich for the New York Nets. During the time between the regular ABA draft and the "Special Circumstances" Draft that the ABA held, the previously mentioned Texas Chaparrals would return to playing solely in their original hometown in Dallas properly to become the Dallas Chaparrals once again as opposed to playing all throughout the state of Texas as a regional franchise similar to that of teams like the aforementioned Carolina Cougars and Virginia Squires, marking this season as the most stable ABA season in terms of teams moving around and changing their team names yet.

=== 1972 ABA draft ===
For this year, this specific draft does not include six rounds of a dispersal draft involving two ABA teams that went defunct after this draft concluded or an expansion draft of a newly created ABA team after this draft was concluded. Like the previous year's ABA draft, this year's ABA draft would also last for 20 rounds (though the number of selections made would decrease partially due to teams forfeiting a good chunk of their top selections in the first five rounds for various reasons, some of which related to conditions involving the originally planned ABA-NBA merger that ultimately didn't occur in the end), though as of 2025, records of the first five rounds for this specific draft year in particular (which began on March 2 that year, with the rest of the rounds being completed on April 12, 1972) have been seen as inconsistent (outside of arguably the first round) when compared to other records of ABA drafts that have been recorded properly (or at least as properly as they have been able to do so). This year's draft would also be the first ABA draft to see college underclassmen get selected by the first five rounds of the draft as an option for each team there after finding notable successes with college underclassmen that went undrafted in the last three draft classes, with their most notable selection in mind being the #1 pick of this year's draft, Bob McAdoo by the Virginia Squires through a trade involving the Pittsburgh Condors earlier in the season (though McAdoo would never play in the ABA akin to most #1 picks in the ABA draft). This led to the NCAA and numerous college basketball coaches strongly criticizing the ABA for first implementing it, though their implementation eventually helped pave the way for other leagues to implement similar systems for college underclassmen as well, including for the rivaling NBA draft system in later years. Months after this draft concluded, both "The Floridians" and the aforementioned Pittsburgh Condors franchises would fold operations entirely, leading to the remaining nine teams (including the recently rebranded Memphis Tams from the Memphis Pros) utilizing the first ever dispersal draft in ABA history before allowing the creation of the San Diego Conquistadors for the league's first and only expansion draft on August 10.

=== 1973 ABA draft ===
For this year's draft, they would forgo the regular draft format that was held in the previous two years (at least) and instead hold a special circumstances draft, a senior draft, an undergraduate draft, and a supplementary draft that would go from January to May of that year. More specifically, the special circumstances draft would be held on January 15 (with the Denver Rockets having the #1 pick from that specific draft due to them having the worst record in the ABA during that period of time), while both the senior draft and undergraduate draft were both held back-to-back on April 25 (one day after the 1973 NBA draft started) and the only supplementary draft the ABA ever did was held on May 18 (thirteen days after the 1973 NBA draft concluded), with the San Diego Conquistadors expansion franchise acquiring the #1 picks in the other drafts (or at least, likely acquired the #1 pick in the supplementary draft alongside the other drafts) due to them having the worst record in the ABA by the end of their inaugural season. For each draft, Mike Bantom of St. Joseph's University by the Denver Rockets, Bo Lamar of the University of Southwestern Louisiana (now University of Louisiana at Lafayette), Bill Walton of UCLA, and Larry Moore of the University of Texas in Arlington by the San Diego Conquistadors for the rest of the guys were all considered the #1 picks of each respective draft that year, with Lamar being considered the official #1 pick of the 1973 ABA draft by historic draft pundits and Walton officially considered the #101 pick of the draft day he was selected in by comparison. The special circumstances draft would be notable for not just the selection of George Gervin (who got drafted by the Virginia Squires from the unrelated Pontiac Chaparrals team in the originally named Continental Basketball Association after being expelled from Eastern Michigan University in his sophomore year), but also for it being the last ever draft that the Dallas Chaparrals franchise would officially participate in. Once the 1972–73 regular season period for the ABA ended, the Chaparrals would move from Dallas to San Antonio to initially become the San Antonio Gunslingers for at least the April drafts, if not the May draft as well, before ultimately becoming the San Antonio Spurs for good by the start of the 1973–74 ABA season (and remaining that way to this day, to the point where records have the team retroactively being listed as the Spurs when drafting under their San Antonio name for 1973), tying the league's record of stability for fewest number of teams to move around or relocate/rebrand themselves from one season to the next.

=== 1974 ABA draft ===
In addition to 10 rounds of the regular ABA draft of college players that had 100 players selected, there would also be an ABA draft of NBA players done during that same year. This would be in major contrast to the previous year's draft where they went with four different draft systems that lasted for a grand total of 29 draft rounds that led to them selecting a grand total of 212 players there. The first two rounds would be done on March 6 that year, while the rest of the draft, including the ABA draft of NBA players that came immediately after the ABA draft proper concluded, occurred on April 17. While this draft period would see some major blows being dealt to the ABA between the quality of their #1 selection and where he would head off to, the fact that all of their top three selections would decline playing in the ABA for varying reasons (mostly playing for the rivaling NBA instead), and that none of the players they selected in the ABA draft of NBA players would actually play for the ABA teams that drafted them properly, this draft would also see a major success story in Petersburg High School senior student Moses Malone being the first player in the modern-day era to be drafted directly out of high school. Malone's success in both the ABA and the NBA later on after the 1976 ABA-NBA merger would influence both the ABA and NBA to draft high schoolers once again the following year, with the NBA later allowing for high schoolers to enter the NBA draft system once again during the late 1990s and early 2000s. This would also be the last draft that the Denver Rockets would participate in under that name, as by August 7 of that year, the team would officially rebrand themselves as the Denver Nuggets (partially to honor the original Denver Nuggets franchise that played in both the National Basketball League and National Basketball Association from 1948 until leaving the NBA to form a new, short-lived rivaling league with three other teams in 1950 and partially to avoid any potential troubles that a shared team name with the Houston Rockets of the NBA could bring later on after they previously used the Rockets name to promote a business that their original team owners had coincided with) to start out the 1974–75 ABA season. This would ultimately become the last ABA team to change their team name that also survived the ABA-NBA merger.

=== 1975 ABA draft ===
For the final draft year of the ABA, this draft would officially last for eight rounds, with the Denver Nuggets having a bonus choice taken at the start of the draft due to the Spirits of St. Louis acquiring Marvin Barnes from them back when the Denver franchise was still known as the Rockets. (The Spirits of St. Louis would also acquire a bonus pick as well, funnily enough, due to them losing the player rights to Billy Cunningham to the Philadelphia 76ers of the NBA by a court case back when they went by the Carolina Cougars, though unlike the Nuggets, the Spirits ultimately decided not to use their bonus pick by comparison, likely for financial reasons.) Unlike their previous drafts, this draft would not only be one day long, but it would also take place after the 1975 NBA draft came and went on June 16 that year, with it having the fewest number of draft picks selectable with 81 official picks made. The final ABA All-Stars ever selected from this draft (#1 pick David Thompson and #30 pick Monte Towe) were both Nuggets players due to the 1976 ABA All-Star Game essentially being the Denver Nuggets (who incidentally agreed to host what ultimately became the final ABA All-Star Game back when the 1975–76 ABA season looked to have the usual ten competing teams at the time and then nine healthy-looking teams once it actually began) against the rest of the league's All-Stars that were on display that season. After the draft period ended, the Memphis Sounds moved out to Baltimore, Maryland to initially become the Baltimore Hustlers before controversy with the name by both fans and the league alike caused them to shift the name out into the Baltimore Claws, while the San Diego Conquistadors decided to rebrand themselves out into the San Diego Sails before starting what would ultimately become the final ABA season.

Before the upcoming season began, though, the Baltimore Claws would officially fold operations on October 20, 1975 (just five days before the start of the regular season) after failing to meet the ABA's own ultimatum of $500,000 to meet a performance bond after showing poor results against the Virginia Squires and the Philadelphia 76ers of the NBA in the preseason. By that time, the ABA would hold a second, more impromptu dispersal draft for the remaining nine teams to utilize for their rosters to select a Claws player on their roster for a spot, if they wanted to do so later that day. Over two weeks later, following the Claws' demise as a franchise, the recently rebranded Sails franchise would suddenly fold operations themselves after only eleven games played (winning only three total games under that name) on November 11 after hearing rumors that the Sails franchise wouldn't get involved in an upcoming ABA-NBA merger due to the owner of the Los Angeles Lakers, Jack Kent Cooke, not wanting any local competition during that time. As a result, a second dispersal draft from the ABA would be held on November 12, with only a select few Sails players being picked up from the now eight remaining ABA franchises this time around. Following that, after rumors of the Utah Stars and Spirits of St. Louis trying to merge their franchises together in order to save themselves as one franchise came and went during the early parts of the season, the Utah Stars would confirm that they would fold operations on December 2 (and subsequently led to the ABA getting rid of divisional play entirely going forward) after playing in sixteen games that season (winning only four games in the process). However, instead of having a third straight dispersal draft, the Spirits of St. Louis would agree to acquire four of the Stars' best players in order to help save their own franchise for the season, with the Virginia Squires also acquiring Jim Eakins from the Stars as well. Despite constant threats of the ABA ending the season with only six available teams in the season, they would end their final regular season period with seven teams completing their regular seasons properly, though they would still end up with only six teams by the end of the 1976 ABA Playoffs due to the Virginia Squires failing to meet a $75,000 assessment and an extra $120,000 in back pay for its players. As a result, the Squires' ownership group would not be involved in the eventual NBA-ABA merger talks of June 1976 like the rest of the ABA teams that survived up until at least the merger period (including the Kentucky Colonels and aforementioned Spirits of St. Louis who initially sought to move to Utah to become the Utah Rockies had their franchise continued onward) and none of the Squires' players would be involved in a dispersal draft done by either the ABA or the NBA in 1976 (though most of the now former Squires players that season would later play in the NBA anyway).

== ABA players not drafted by the league from before 1967 ==
Unlike the NBA draft's early undrafted players when they primarily relied on players that played on independent teams or rivaling professional leagues like the National Basketball League and original American Basketball League back when the NBA first started out as the Basketball Association of America around the end of basketball's "Wild West" era of nearly anything goes professional basketball leagues, the ABA primarily utilized their own drafting system for players during their nine-year run, with many (though not all) of their undrafted players they acquired during their early years in particular coming from players that were previously eligible for NBA drafts from as early as the 1950s all the way up until the 1966 NBA draft before the ABA began operations in 1967 (with there being very rare instances of players also being drafted by teams in the second incarnation of the American Basketball League as well, if not playing for said teams there). That being said, there were many times (especially in their early years) that the ABA would take players that were considered "undrafted" by the ABA's own standards because they were either already late into their playing careers and felt that they could have at least one more year left to play on their ends; were stuck playing in either the Amateur Athletic Union, National Alliance of Basketball Leagues (a spiritual successor to the National Industrial Basketball League), or Eastern Professional Basketball League (later Eastern Basketball Association and Continental Basketball Association) before being given a shot at professional play in the ABA; had previously been drafted by the NBA at a young enough age, yet couldn't make it to an NBA roster properly for whatever reason; or in the case of a select few players like Jim Ligon and those that had been considered to have been involved in the 1961 NCAA University Division men's basketball gambling scandal, had been in trouble with the law (or were considered to be in trouble with the law since some of these players were already banned by the NBA earlier on by that time) and sought to get a second chance in life and professional basketball while playing in the ABA. Only two players in Dick Lee and Penny Ann Early were seen as players that were more gimmicky in nature than actual ABA players to most basketball historians due to the former being a public relations guy for the Anaheim Amigos that was forced onto their roster later into their only season of play due to injuries and played in two games due to foul trouble involving most of their proper roster and the latter being a female playing member of the Kentucky Colonels for one inbound pass due to multiple protests involving male jockey due to her being the first female jockey to compete in the Churchill Downs in 1968. Despite their brief cameos being seen as more gimmicky in nature by comparison, both of them will be included in the official listing properly for the sake of transparency, though Penny Ann Early's school and year will currently involve her graduation year from high school since it's unknown if she even went to college at all, never mind what college she might have attended at the time. On a related note, both Hall of Fame players Connie Hawkins and Roger Brown will have their draft eligible years be listed as 1961 due to their aforementioned involvement in the 1961 NCAA University Division men's basketball gambling scandal resulting in them both being expelled in their respective colleges as freshmen, despite them both being considered draft eligible by as late as 1964 by the NBA instead. Also, out of 92 total players to have made it to at least one ABA All-Star Game, 35 of the game's players were considered undrafted players from before the ABA officially existed, at least in terms of the ABA's own standards. Also, some players don't have their official graduation years (or years they officially left college (or high school in very rare circumstances)) listed publicly, so their official eligible draft years might not be 100% correct, though in those instances, it's highly recommended to move the players with those incorrect years to their proper years once those years get properly fixed up for those specific players in question. With all of that said and out of the way, the following players have played at least one game in the ABA throughout its nine seasons of existence (with every season outside of the final season having at least one player eligible for at least the 1966 NBA draft, if not earlier playing in the ABA) while (mostly) being considered NBA draft eligible in these following years below.

Pos.	G	F	C
Position	Guard	Forward	Center

Accomplishments key
Symbol	Meaning	Symbol	Meaning
^	Denotes player who has been inducted to the Naismith Memorial Basketball Hall of Fame	‡	Denotes player that was selected to the ABA All-Time Team
*	Denotes player who has been selected for at least one All-Star Game and All-ABA Team	+	Denotes player who has been selected for at least one All-Star Game

Draft	Player	Pos.	Nationality	School/Club team
1953	Cliff Hagan^{+}^	SF	United States	Kentucky (Sr.)
1957	Walt Byrd	PF	United States	Temple (So.)
1958	Adrian Smith	PG	United States	Kentucky (Sr.)
1959	John Barnhill	PG/SG	United States	Tennessee A&I State College (Sr.)
1960	Jackie Moreland	SG/SF	United States	Louisiana Polytechnic Institute (Sr.)
1960	Mel Peterson	SG/SF	United States	Wheaton College (Illinois) (Sr.)
1960	Joe Roberts	PF	United States	Ohio State (Sr.)
1960	Bob Sims	SG	United States	Pepperdine (Sr.)
1960	Herschell Turner	PG	United States	Nebraska (Sr.)
1960	Leroy Wright	PF	United States	College of the Pacific (Sr.)
1961	Roger Brown*^‡	SF	United States	Dayton (Fr.)
1961	Penny Ann Early	PG	United States	Senn High School (HS Sr.)
1961	Connie Hawkins*^‡	PF/C	United States	Iowa (Fr.)
1961	Ron Horn	SF	United States	U.S. Armed Forces (AAU)
1961	Tony Jackson^{+}	SG/SF	United States	St. John's (Sr.)
1961	Doug Moe*‡	SF	United States	North Carolina (Sr.)
1961	Ray Scott	PF/C	United States	Allentown Jets (EPBL)
1961	Walt Simon^{+}	SF	United States	Benedict (Sr.)
1961	Bruce Spraggins	SF	United States	Virginia Union (Sr.)
1961	Ben Warley^{+}	SG/SF	United States	Cleveland Pipers (NIBL)
1961	Hank Whitney	PF	United States	Iowa State (Sr.)
1962	Zelmo Beaty*^‡	C	United States	Prairie View A&M College (Sr.)
1962	Len Chappell	PF/C	United States	Wake Forest College (Sr.)
1962	Calvin Fowler	PG	United States	Saint Francis College (Pennsylvania) (Sr.)
1962	Bill Garner	C	United States	Portland (Sr.)
1962	Jim Hadnot	C	United States	Providence (Sr.)
1962	Reggie Harding	C	United States	Nashville Christian Institute (HS Sr.)
1962	Wayne Hightower^{+}	PF	United States	Real Madrid (Spain)
1962	Jim Ligon^{+}	PF/C	United States	Kokomo High School (HS Sr.)
1962	Bill McGill	PF/C	United States	Utah (Sr.)
1962	Mel Nowell	PG/SG	United States	Ohio State (Sr.)
1962	Bud Olsen	PF/C	United States	Louisville (Sr.)
1962	Bobby Rascoe	SG/SF	United States	Western Kentucky (Sr.)
1962	Willis Thomas	SG	United States	Tennessee A&I State College (Sr.)
1962	Chico Vaughn^{+}	PG/SG	United States	Southern Illinois (Sr.)
1962	Hubie White	SG	United States	Villanova (Sr.)
1962	Gene Wiley	C	United States	Municipal University of Wichita (Sr.)
1963	Tom Bowens	PF/C	United States	Grambling College (Sr.)
1963	Orbie Bowling	C	United States	Tennessee (Sr.)
1963	Larry Brown*^	PG	United States	North Carolina (Sr.)
1963	Harry Dinnel	SG/SF	United States	Pepperdine (Sr.)
1963	Smokey Gaines	SG	United States	LeMoyne College (Sr.)
1963	Art Heyman^{+}	SG/SF	United States	Duke (Sr.)
1963	Jerry Harkness	PG	United States	Loyola (Chicago) (Sr.)
1963	Tom Hoover	C	United States	Camden Bullets (EPBL)
1963	Gus Johnson^	SF/PF	United States	Idaho (So.)
1963	George Lehmann	PG/SG	United States	Sunbury Mercuries (EPBL)
1963	Leland Mitchell	SG	United States	Mississippi State (Sr.)
1963	Jimmy Rayl	PG	United States	Indiana (Sr.)
1963	Red Stroud	PG	United States	Mississippi State (Sr.)
1963	Tom Thacker	SG/SF	United States	Cincinnati (Sr.)
1963	Bob Warlick	SG	United States	Pepperdine (Sr.)
1963	Art Williams	PG	United States	Cal Poly School Kellogg-Voorhees Unit (Sr.)
1963	Bob Woollard	C	United States	Wake Forest College (Sr.)
1964	Al Beard	C	United States	Norfolk Polytechnic College (Sr.)
1964	Art Becker^{+}	SF/PF	United States	Arizona State (Sr.)
1964	Ron Bonham	SG/SF	United States	Cincinnati (Sr.)
1964	Gary Bradds	SF/PF	United States	Ohio State (Sr.)
1964	Bill Bradley	PG/SG	United States	Tennessee A&I State College (Sr.)
1964	Joe Caldwell*	SG/SF	United States	Arizona State (Sr.)
1964	Darel Carrier^{+}‡	SG	United States	Western Kentucky (Sr.)
1964	Bill Crow	PG	United States	Westminster College (Sr.)
1964	Bobby Joe Edmonds	SF	United States	Tennessee A&I State College (Sr.)
1964	Gerald Govan^{+}	PF/C	United States	St. Mary of the Plains College (Sr.)
1964	Ira Harge	C	United States	New Mexico (Sr.)
1964	Les Hunter^{+}	PF	United States	Loyola (Chicago) (Sr.)
1964	Larry Jones*	PG/SG	United States	Toledo (Sr.)
1964	Steve "Snapper" Jones^{+}	SG	United States	Oregon (Sr.)
1964	Wali Jones	PG/SG	United States	Villanova (Sr.)
1964	Barry Kramer	SF	United States	New York University (Sr.)
1964	Dave Lee	SF	United States	San Francisco (Sr.)
1964	Johnny Mathis	PF	United States	Savannah State College (Sr.)
1964	Maurice McHartley	PG/SG	United States	North Carolina A&T College (Sr.)
1964	Willie Murrell	SF	United States	Kansas State (Sr.)
1964	Cotton Nash	SF	United States	Kentucky (Sr.)
1964	Kendall Rhine	C	United States	Rice (Sr.)
1964	Les Selvage	PG/SG	United States	Northeast Missouri State Teachers College (Sr.)
1964	Levern Tart^{+}	SG	United States	Bradley (Sr.)
1965	Dan Anderson	C	United States	Augsburg College (Sr.)
1965	Mike Barrett	PG/SG	United States	West Virginia Institute of Technology (Sr.)
1965	Rick Barry*^‡	SF	United States	Miami (Florida) (Sr.)
1965	Nate Bowman	C	United States	Wichita State (Sr.)
1965	Jesse Branson	SF	United States	Elon College (Sr.)
1965	Jim Caldwell	C	United States	Georgia Tech (Sr.)
1965	Billy Cunningham*^‡	SF/PF	United States	North Carolina (Sr.)
1965	Warren Davis^{+}	SF/PF	United States	Wilkes-Barre Barons (EPBL)
1965	John Fairchild	PF	United States	Brigham Young (Sr.)
1965	Wilbert Frazier	PF/C	United States	Grambling College (Sr.)
1965	Jim Jarvis	PG	United States	Oregon State (Sr.)
1965	Terry Kunze	SG	United States	Minnesota (Sr.)
1965	Dick Lee	SF	United States	Washington (Sr.)
1965	Elton McGriff	C	United States	Creighton (Sr.)
1965	Bill Meyer	PG/SG	United States	Hiram College (Sr)
1965	Jay Miller	SF	United States	Notre Dame (Sr.)
1965	Wayne Molis	C	United States	Lewis College (Sr.)
1965	Willie Porter	PF	United States	Stoop's All-Stars (AAU)
1965	Cincy Powell*	SF/PF	United States	Portland (Sr.)
1965	Flynn Robinson	PG	United States	Wyoming (Sr.)
1965	Jerry Rook	SF	United States	Arkansas State College (Sr.)
1965	Roger Schurig	PG	United States	Vanderbilt (Sr.)
1965	Willie Somerset^{+}	PG	United States	Duquesne (Sr.)
1965	George Sutor	C	United States	La Salle College (Sr.)
1965	Skip Thoren^{+}	C	United States	Illinois (Sr.)
1965	Charlie Williams*	PG/SG	United States	Seattle (Sr.)
1966	Henry Akin	PF/C	United States	William Carey College (Sr.)
1966	John Austin	PG	United States	Boston College (Sr.)
1966	Howard Bayne	PF	United States	Tennessee (Sr.)
1966	John Beasley*	PF/C	United States	Texas A&M (Sr.)
1966	Bob Bedell	PF	United States	Stanford (Sr.)
1966	Spider Bennett	PG	United States	Winston-Salem State College (Sr.)
1966	Jerry Chambers	SF	United States	Utah (Sr.)
1966	Steve Chubin	PG/SG	United States	Rhode Island (Sr.)
1966	John Clawson	SF	United States	Michigan (Sr.)
1966	John Comeaux	SF	United States	Grambling College (Sr.)
1966	Jeff Congdon	PG	United States	Brigham Young (Sr.)
1966	Larry Conley	SG	United States	Kentucky (Sr.)
1966	Mike Dabich	C	United States	New Mexico State (Sr.)
1966	Ollie Darden	PF	United States	Michigan (Sr.)
1966	Donnie Freeman*‡	PG/SG	United States	Illinois (Sr.)
1966	Chuck Gardner	PF	United States	Colorado (Sr.)
1966	Dennis Hamilton	PF	United States	Arizona State (Sr.)
1966	Julian Hammond	SF	United States	Tulsa (Sr.)
1966	Joe Hamood	SG	United States	Houston (Sr.)
1966	Bob Hogsett	PF	United States	Tennessee (Sr.)
1966	Carroll Hooser	PF	United States	Southern Methodist (Sr.)
1966	Hal Jeter	PG/SG	United States	Drake (Sr.)
1966	Neil Johnson^{+}	PF/C	United States	Creighton (Sr.)
1966	Stew Johnson^{+}	PF/C	United States	Murray State College (Sr.)
1966	Johnny Jones	SF	United States	Allentown Jets (EPBL)
1966	Tom Kerwin	SF/PF	United States	Centenary (Sr.)
1966	Steve Kramer	SG	United States	Brigham Young (Sr.)
1966	Tommy Kron	SG	United States	Kentucky (Sr.)
1966	Freddie Lewis^{+}‡	PG	United States	Arizona State (Sr.)
1966	Riney Lochmann	SF	United States	Kansas (Sr.)
1966	R. B. Lynam	PG	United States	Oklahoma Baptist (Sr.)
1966	Lonnie Lynn	SF	United States	Wilberforce University (Sr.)
1966	Bob McIntyre	SF	United States	St. John's (Sr.)
1966	Bill Melchionni*	PG	United States	Villanova (Sr.)
1966	Erwin Mueller	PF/C	United States	San Francisco (Sr.)
1966	Dick Nemelka	SG	United States	Utah (Sr.)
1966	Rich Parks	SF	United States	Saint Louis (Sr.)
1966	George Peeples	C	United States	Iowa (Sr.)
1966	Red Robbins*	PF/C	United States	Tennessee (Sr.)
1966	Paul Scranton	SF	United States	Cal Poly School Kellogg-Voorhees Unit (Sr.)
1966	Grant Simmons	PG	United States	Nebraska (Sr.)
1966	Gary Turner	SF/PF	United States	Texas Christian University (Sr.)
1966	Steve Vacendak	PG	United States	Duke (Sr.)
1966	Jim Ware	PF	United States	Oklahoma City (Sr.)
1966	Ken Wilburn	SF	United States	Central State (Sr.)
1966	Lonnie Wright	PG/SG	United States	Colorado State (Sr.)
