= 1967–68 Anaheim Amigos season =

- Head coach: Al Brightman (12–24); Harry Dinnel (13–29)
- Owner(s): Art Kim; James Ackerman
- Arena: Anaheim Convention Center

Results
- Record: 25–53 (.321)
- Place: Division: 5th (ABA)
- Playoff finish: Did not qualify

Local media
- Television: KTTV 11

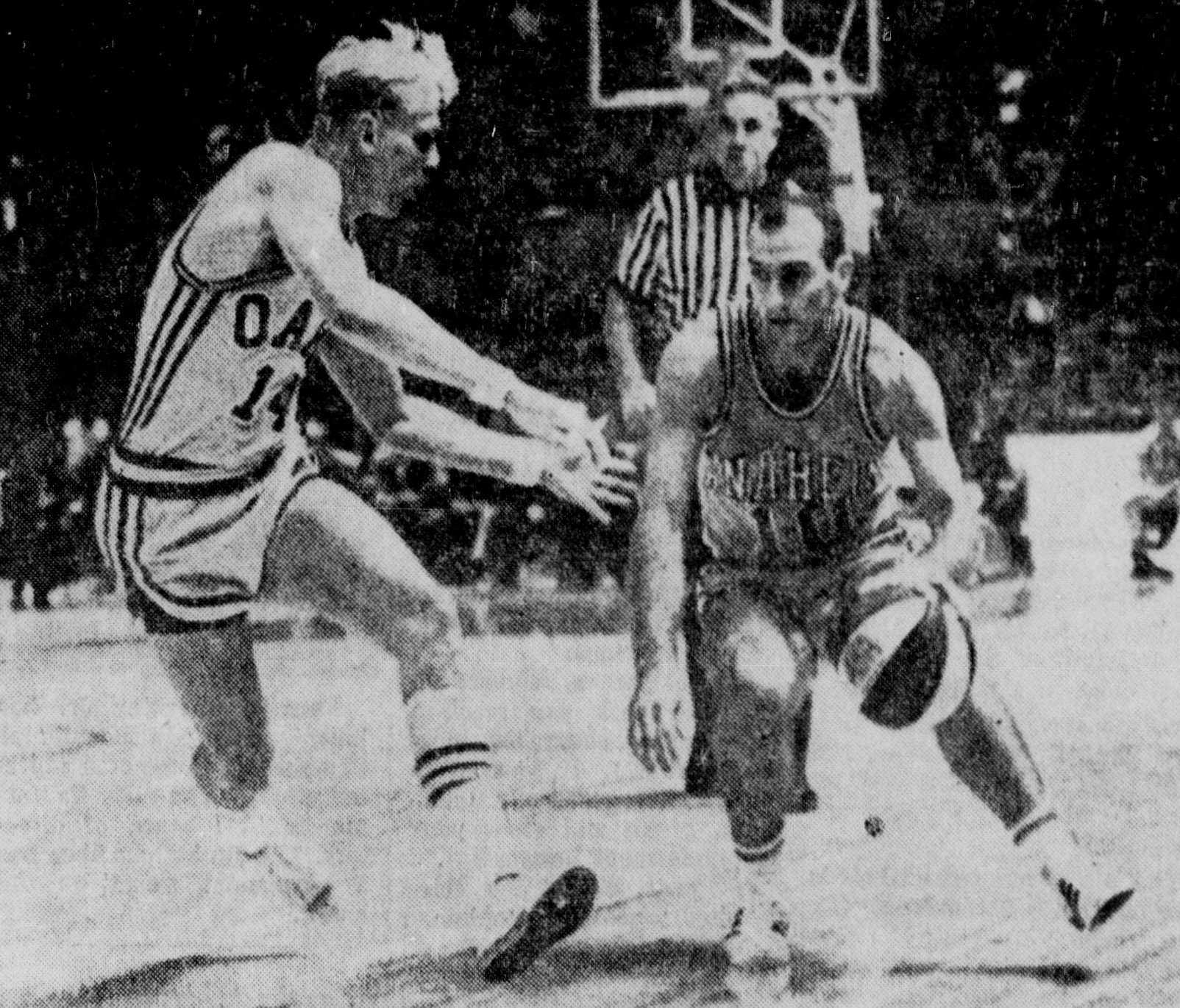
Andrew Anderson (left) of the Oakland Oaks guarding Jeff Congdon (right) of the Anaheim Amigos during the first American Basketball Association game on October 13, 1967, in Oakland, California.

The 1967–68 Anaheim Amigos season was the only season of the franchise in the American Basketball Association (ABA). On February 2, 1967, a charter franchise in Anaheim, California was awarded to Art Kim and James Ackerman for $30,000. They participated in the first ever ABA game, losing 134–129 to the Oakland Oaks. The team ended up losing their first five games of the season, winning their first game 13 days later. The team only played 12 games at home in the calendar year of 1967, while playing on the road (or at a neutral site) for the other 25. The team failed to garner much interest from the locale, along with having to deal with working around the Convention Center's busy schedule due to being across the street from Disneyland. Three of the home games for the Amigos were played in Honolulu, Hawaii (supposedly to have a sense of Art Kim having a professional basketball team in his home state after failing with his first venture through the Hawaii Chiefs in the short-lived American Basketball League revival, which could be considered to be a precursor to the ABA). The team lost $500,000 over the course of the season. They led the league in turnovers with 1,516, averaging over 19 a game, with the highest being 36 against the Denver Rockets.

After the Amigos lost on December 27, Harry Dinnel took over as coach before they played the next day on the 28th. The team never won more than three games in a row, with their highest winning streak being 2 games, which they did 7 times. From January 7 to January 21, they lost 8 straight games. After the season, the team moved to Los Angeles to become the Los Angeles Stars. Jim Hardy, the newly hired general manager for the Stars stated that "This is a brand-new franchise. We will have new players, new uniforms, new management, as well as a new home. The Amigos have been buried, and we burned their uniforms after the final game." Despite that notion, however, the Stars would stay in the city of Los Angeles for the next two seasons before the Stars later left the state of California and moved to the nearby state of Utah to become the Utah Stars for the rest of their existence going forward.

== Roster ==
1967–68 Anaheim Amigos roster
Players

Pos.	No.	Player	Height	Weight	DOB	From
C	30	Bill Allen	6 ft 8 in (2.03 m)	205 lb (93 kg)	1945	New Mexico State
PF	22	Bob Bedell	6 ft 7 in (2.01 m)	205 lb (93 kg)	1944-06-26	Stanford
C	52	Larry Bunce	7 ft 0 in (2.13 m)	240 lb (109 kg)	1945-07-29	Utah State
SG	14, 20, 34	Steve Chubin	6 ft 2 in (1.88 m)	200 lb (91 kg)	1944-02-08	Rhode Island
PG	10	Jeffrey Congdon	6 ft 1 in (1.85 m)	180 lb (82 kg)	1943-10-17	BYU
G	14	Bill Crow	6 ft 1 in (1.85 m)	180 lb (82 kg)	1940-12-09	Westminster (UT)
PF	30, 44	Warren Davis	6 ft 6 in (1.98 m)	212 lb (96 kg)	1943-06-30	North Carolina A&T
G/F	34	Harry Dinnel	6 ft 4 in (1.93 m)	200 lb (91 kg)	1940-10-09	Pepperdine
SF	24	John Fairchild	6 ft 8 in (2.03 m)	205 lb (93 kg)	1943-04-28	BYU
C	42	Bill Garner	6 ft 10 in (2.08 m)	220 lb (100 kg)	1940-06-17	Portland
SG	32	Steve Kramer	6 ft 5 in (1.96 m)	200 lb (91 kg)	1945-01-01	BYU
F		Dick Lee	6 ft 6 in (1.98 m)			Washington
F	50	Larry Moore	6 ft 7 in (2.01 m)	215 lb (98 kg)	1942-07-10	Florida State
F	50	Paul Scranton	6 ft 8 in (2.03 m)	230 lb (104 kg)	1944-04-30	Cal Poly Pomona
PG	12	Les Selvage	6 ft 1 in (1.85 m)	175 lb (79 kg)	1943-03-07	Truman State
SG		Bob Sims	6 ft 5 in (1.96 m)	220 lb (100 kg)	1938-10-09	Pepperdine
PF	44	Randy Stoll	6 ft 7 in (2.01 m)	235 lb (107 kg)		Washington State
SG	10	Willis Thomas	6 ft 2 in (1.88 m)	185 lb (84 kg)		LA Harbor
PG	34, 50	Herschell Turner	6 ft 2 in (1.88 m)	195 lb (88 kg)	1938-03-29	Nebraska
SF	40	Ben Warley	6 ft 5 in (1.96 m)	200 lb (91 kg)	1936-10-04	Tennessee State

Coaches
Head coach
- Al Brightman
- Harry Dinnel

Legend
- (DP) Unsigned draft pick
- (FA) Free agent
- (S) Suspended
- Injured

== Regular season ==
=== Western Division ===
Team	W	L	PCT.	GB
New Orleans Buccaneers	48	30	.615	–
Dallas Chaparrals	46	32	.590	2
Denver Rockets	45	33	.577	3
Houston Mavericks	29	49	.372	19
Anaheim Amigos	25	53	.321	23
Oakland Oaks	22	56	.282	26

=== Game log ===
1967–68 Game log
#	Date	Opponent	Score	High points	Attendance	Record
1	October 13	@ Oakland	129–134	John Fairchild (30)	4,828	0–1
2	October 15	@ Denver	105–110	Lester Selvage (26)	2,748	0–2
3	October 16	@ Dallas	125–129	Stephen Chubin (24)	3,200	0–3
4	October 18	@ Indiana	103–106	John Fairchild (24)	5,923	0–4
5	October 24	@ Kentucky	127–128	Stephen Chubin (42)	2,601	0–5
6	October 26	@ Minnesota	115–99	Stephen Chubin (24)	807	1–5
7	October 29	Oakland	120–123	Lester Selvage (29)	3,716	1–6
8	October 31	Oakland	126–123	John Fairchild (26); Lester Selvage (26)	1,013	2–6
9	November 3	Pittsburgh	101–94	Ben Warley (27)	1,432	3–6
10	November 4	@ Kentucky	103–104	Ben Warley (29)	5,152	3–7
11	November 5	@ Minnesota	92–119	Ben Warley (22)	2,230	3–8
12	November 6	@ Denver	100–121	Stephen Chubin (29)	2,954	3–9
13	November 8	Houston	104–101	Larry Bunce (24)	1,114	4–9
14	November 13	@ New Orleans	98–106	Steven Kramer (24)	1,724	4–10
15	November 14	@ Houston	106–113	Ben Warley (28)	1,089	4–11
16	November 15	@ Dallas	116–105	Lester Selvage (24)	2,710	5–11
17	November 19	Oakland	100–102	Bob Bedell (21); Lester Selvage (21)	1,095	5–12
18	November 21	Minnesota	101–110	Ben Warley (24)	1,242	5–13
19	November 23	@ Oakland Oaks	107–95	Warren Davis (32)	4,787	6–13
20	November 25	New Orleans^{[a]}	98–118	Stephen Chubin (24)	1,764	6–14
21	November 26	@ Dallas	102–114	Bob Bedell (23)	2,032	6–15
22	November 28	@ New Jersey	110–104	Warren Davis (25)	1,234	7–15
23	November 29	@ New Jersey	101–106	Stephen Chubin (30)	1,814	7–16
24	December 2	@ Indiana	117–132	Warren Davis (29)	3,987	7–17
25	December 3	@ Denver	87–100	Ben Warley (24)	2,914	7–18
26	December 6	@ Houston	124–100	Ben Warley (30)	1,020	8–18
27	December 8	@ Dallas	110–123	Warren Davis (33)	3,620	8–19

== Notes ==
- ^{a} The game was held at Mid-South Coliseum in Memphis, Tennessee.

== Awards and honors ==
1968 ABA All-Star Game selections (game played on January 9, 1968)

- Ben Warley
- Larry Bunce
