= 1969–70 Indiana Pacers season =

ABA professional basketball team season

- ABA champions
- Division champions
- Head coach: Bobby Leonard
- Arena: Indiana State Fairgrounds Coliseum

Results
- Record: 59–25 (.702)
- Place: Division: 1st (Eastern)
- Playoff finish: ABA Champions (Defeated Stars 4–2)
- Stats at Basketball Reference

Local media
- Television: WLWI 13
- Radio: WIRE

The 1969–70 Indiana Pacers season was Indiana's third season in the ABA and third as a team. Near the end of the regular season, on April 12, 1970, the Pacers would record an ABA record-high 177 points scored in a match played against the Pittsburgh Pipers at home; as of March 27, 2025, their 177–135 win against Pittsburgh would be the highest overall scoring game the Pacers ever had when you include their history in the ABA (if you exclude it, however, their highest-scoring game happened on March 27, 2025, against the Washington Wizards in the NBA with a 162–109 blowout win). In fact, the Pacers' 177 points scored would be a professional basketball record for the most points scored by a team (either in the ABA or the NBA) by one team until both the Denver Nuggets (the current iteration of the Denver Rockets) and Detroit Pistons (who previously won the lowest-scoring NBA game ever recorded back when they were the Fort Wayne Pistons) would break the Pacers' ABA record on the same night on December 13, 1983, with Detroit winning the highest-scoring NBA game recorded (as of 2025) over Denver with a 186–184 triple-overtime score, as well as remain a record for the highest scoring effort by a team without going to overtime in either league and would still remain the third-highest scoring effort ever recorded by a current NBA team if the ABA's records were to count alongside the NBA's records. The Pacers finished first in the Eastern Division and won their first ABA title in their second ABA Finals appearance in franchise history after previously losing the ABA Finals the previous season to the Oakland Oaks (who would move to Washington, D.C. to become the Washington Caps following that season's conclusion due to financial troubles on the Oaks' end).

In the Eastern Division semifinals, the Pacers swept the newly created Carolina Cougars, who were born following new ownership for the previously existing Houston Mavericks agreeing to move that team following their final season under that name to the state of North Carolina as the ABA's first ever regional franchise, in four games. In the Eastern Division finals, the Pacers eliminated their stateside archrivals, the Kentucky Colonels, in five games. The Western Division champion Los Angeles Stars (who made it to the ABA Finals unexpectedly to many people following the team due to them expecting another losing season at the time and only barely making it to the 1970 ABA Playoffs after making it as the #4 seed in their division by the end of the season) appeared in the ABA Championships for the first time, with the Stars being defeated by the Pacers in six games in what later turned out to be the Stars' final games in the city of Los Angeles. Following this season's conclusion, due to over half of the ABA teams from this season moving and/or rebranding their squads to start the 1970–71 ABA season, the Pacers would move from the Eastern Division to the Western Division (which included the recently moved and rebranded Utah Stars, who would become divisional rivals for the Pacers until they folded operations during the 1975–76 ABA season) for the rest of their ABA tenure (excluding a majority of the 1975–76 ABA season leading to there being no divisions at all following the folding of three teams, including the Stars, by the start of December 1975), with them not returning to play as an Eastern team until the 1980–81 NBA season.

== Offseason ==
=== ABA Draft ===
Player	School/Club team
Willie McCarter	Drake University (Sr.)
Dick Grubar	University of North Carolina (Sr.)
Tony Masiello	Canisius College (Sr.)
Bob Arnzen	University of Notre Dame (Sr.)
Bill DeHeer	Indiana University (Sr.)
Dave Golden	Duke University (Sr.)
Billy Keller	Purdue University (Sr.)
Gerald McKee	Ohio University (Sr.)
Ron Peret	Texas A&M University (Sr.)
John Jamerson	Fairmount State College (Sr.)
Jim Stephenson	University of Maine (Sr.)

== Roster ==
1969–70 Indiana Pacers roster
Players

Pos.	No.	Player	Height	Weight	DOB	From
SG	12	John Barnhill	6 ft 1 in (1.85 m)	180 lb (82 kg)	March 20, 1938	Tennessee State
PF	43	Art Becker	6 ft 7 in (2.01 m)	205 lb (93 kg)	January 12, 1942	Arizona State
SF	35	Roger Brown	6 ft 5 in (1.96 m)	205 lb (93 kg)	May 22, 1942	Dayton
SG	30	Steve Chubin	6 ft 2 in (1.88 m)	200 lb (91 kg)	February 8, 1944	Rhode Island
C	34	Mel Daniels	6 ft 9 in (2.06 m)	220 lb (100 kg)	July 20, 1944	New Mexico
PF	33	Ollie Darden	6 ft 7 in (2.01 m)	235 lb (107 kg)	July 28, 1944	Michigan
SF	42	Bobby Joe Edmonds	6 ft 6 in (1.98 m)	220 lb (100 kg)	March 8, 1941	Tennessee State
SF	30	John Fairchild	6 ft 8 in (2.03 m)	205 lb (93 kg)	April 28, 1943	BYU
G	15	Dick Grubar	6 ft 4 in (1.93 m)	184 lb (83 kg)	July 26, 1947	North Carolina
SG	11	Billy Keller	5 ft 10 in (1.78 m)	177 lb (80 kg)	August 30, 1947	Purdue
PG	14	Freddie Lewis	6 ft 0 in (1.83 m)	175 lb (79 kg)	July 1, 1943	Arizona State
G	23	Jerry McKee	6 ft 3 in (1.91 m)	190 lb (86 kg)	August 4, 1946	Ohio
SF	32	Jay Miller	6 ft 5 in (1.96 m)	205 lb (93 kg)	July 19, 1943	Notre Dame
PF	24	Bob Netolicky	6 ft 9 in (2.06 m)	220 lb (100 kg)	August 2, 1942	Drake
PG	33	Barry Orms	6 ft 3 in (1.91 m)	190 lb (86 kg)	May 1, 1946	Saint Louis
PG	44	Tom Thacker	6 ft 2 in (1.88 m)	170 lb (77 kg)	November 2, 1939	Cincinnati

Coaches
Head coach
- Bobby Leonard

Legend
- (DP) Unsigned draft pick
- (FA) Free agent
- (S) Suspended
- Injured

Roster

== Regular season ==
=== ABA Schedule ===
Game	Date	Opponent	Result	Pacers points	Opponents	Record
1						
2						

=== Season standings ===
1969–70 ABA Eastern Standings
Western Division	W	L	PCT.	GB
Indiana Pacers	59	25	.702	–
Kentucky Colonels	45	39	.536	14
Carolina Cougars	42	42	.500	17
New York Nets	39	45	.464	20
Pittsburgh Pipers	29	55	.345	30
Miami Floridians	23	61	.274	36

== Awards, records, and honors ==
- 1970 ABA All-Star Game
  - Roger Brown
  - Mel Daniels
  - Freddie Lewis
  - Bob Netolicky

== Player stats ==
Legend
GP	Games played	GS	Games started	MPG	Minutes per game
FG%	Field-goal percentage	3P%	3-point field-goal percentage	FT%	Free-throw percentage
RPG	Rebounds per game	APG	Assists per game	SPG	Steals per game
BPG	Blocks per game	PPG	Points per game

=== Regular season ===
Player	GP	MPG	FG%	3P%	FT%	TRB	APG	PPG
Roger Brown	84	41.6	.498	.333	.813	7.4	4.7	23.0
Bob Netolicky	82	39.3	.483	.286	.683	10.7	1.5	20.6
Mel Daniels	83	36.6	.473	.000	.675	17.6	1.6	18.7
Freddie Lewis	81	35.5	.421	.266	.790	3.4	3.6	16.4
John Barnhill	77	30.8	.394	.261	.664	2.2	4.1	11.4
Art Becker	82	18.3	.521	.000	.810	4.6	0.5	8.9
Bill Keller	82	18.1	.397	.273	.850	2.1	2.9	8.7
Barry Orms	9	15.9	.425	.000	.654	4.1	1.4	5.7
Tom Thacker	70	14.5	.330	.256	.551	3.0	2.6	2.7
Steve Chubin	32	11.9	.441	.500	.833	1.3	2.2	4.2
Ollie Darden	26	11.1	.388	.250	.696	3.5	0.5	4.3
John Fairchild	3	8.7	.167		.500	3.0	0.7	1.0
Jay Miller	52	8.0	.449	.000	.719	1.5	0.3	3.7
Bobby Edmonds	3	4.0	.200		.333	1.3	0.0	1.0
Dick Grubar	2	4.0	.667			0.0	0.5	2.0
Jerry McKee	1	3.0	.000			0.0	0.0	0.0

== Transactions ==
- October 9, 1969
  - Traded George Peeples and Ron Perry to the Carolina Cougars for Arthur Becker, Spider Bennett and Tony Jackson.
- October 28, 1969
  - Traded John Fairchild to the Kentucky Colonels for cash.
- November 11, 1969
  - Traded cash to the New York Nets for Stephen Chubin.
  - Waived Bobby Edmonds.
- January 22, 1970
  - Drafted Rick Mount in the ?? round (?? pick) of the 1970 ABA Draft.
- January 31, 1970
  - Claimed Ollie Darden on waivers from the Kentucky Colonels.
- March 9, 1970
  - Signed Rick Mount.
- March 17, 1970
  - Stephen Chubin claimed on waivers by the Kentucky Colonels.

== ABA Playoffs ==
ABA Eastern Division Semifinals vs Carolina Cougars

Game	Date	Location	Result	Record	Attendance
1	April 18	Indiana	123–105	1–0	6,123
2	April 19	Indiana	103–98	2–0	6,341
3	April 22	Carolina	103–98	3–0	3,381
4	April 24	Carolina	110–106	4–0	5,211

Pacers win series, 4–0

ABA Eastern Division Finals vs Kentucky Colonels

Game	Date	Location	Result	Record	Attendance
1	May 1	Indiana	114–110	1–0	5,939
2	May 2	Indiana	110–121	1–1	7,007
3	May 3	Kentucky	114–110	2–1	3,024
4	May 5	Kentucky	111–103	3–1	3,476
5	May 6	Indiana	117–103	4–1	5,453

Pacers win series, 4–1

ABA Finals vs Los Angeles Stars

Game	Date	Location	Result	Record	Attendance
1	May 15	Indiana	109–93	1–0	7,881
2	May 17	Indiana	114–111	2–0	9,014
3	May 18	Los Angeles	106–109	2–1	5,780
4	May 19	Los Angeles	142–120	3–1	7,027
5	May 23	Indiana	113–117	3–2	10,548
6	May 25	Los Angeles	111–107	4–2	8,233

Pacers win championship series, 4–2
