= Herschell Turner =

American basketball player (1938–2024)

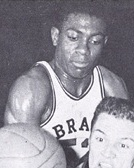
- Turner with the Nebraska Cornhuskers in 1959

Personal information
- Born: March 29, 1938 Indianapolis, Indiana, U.S.
- Died: August 13, 2024 (aged 86) Grand Rapids, Michigan, U.S.
- Listed height: 6 ft 2 in (1.88 m)
- Listed weight: 195 lb (88 kg)

Career information
- High school: Shortridge (Indianapolis, Indiana)
- College: Nebraska (1957–1960)
- NBA draft: 1960: 6th round, 45th overall pick
- Drafted by: Syracuse Nationals
- Playing career: 1960–1968
- Position: Point guard
- Number: 45, 34, 50

Career history
- 1960–1961: Baltimore Bullets
- 1961–1962: Chicago Majors
- 1962–1963: Scranton Miners
- 1967: Pittsburgh Pipers
- 1967–1968: Anaheim Amigos

Career highlights
- All-ABL Second Team (1962); EPBL champion (1961); First-team All-Big Eight (1960)
- Stats at Basketball Reference

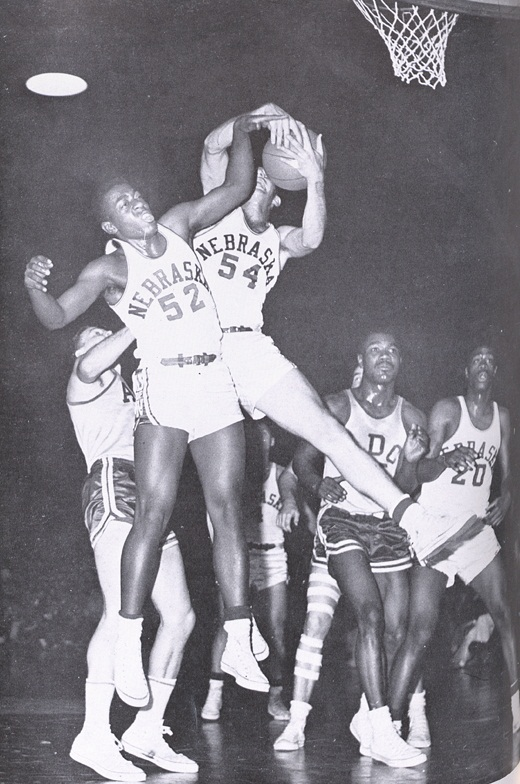
Turner battles for a rebound with Nebraska Cornhuskers teammate Bob Harry

Herschell C. Turner (March 29, 1938 – August 13, 2024) was an American professional basketball player.

Turner played basketball at Shortridge High School in Indianapolis and college basketball for the Nebraska Cornhuskers. He was selected by the Syracuse Nationals as the 45th overall pick of the 1960 NBA draft.

Turner played for the Baltimore Bullets of the Eastern Professional Basketball League (EPBL) during the 1960–61 season and won the EPBL championship in 1961. He played two games with the Scranton Miners of the EPBL during the 1962–63 season.

Turner played for the Anaheim Amigos and Pittsburgh Pipers of the American Basketball Association (ABA) during the 1967–68 season. He also played for the Harlem Globetrotters.

Following his basketball career, Turner became an exhibited painter. He died in Grand Rapids, Michigan, on August 13, 2024, at the age of 86.

== Career statistics ==
Legend
| GP | Games played | GS | Games started | MPG | Minutes per game |
| FG% | Field goal percentage | 3P% | 3-point field goal percentage | FT% | Free throw percentage |
| RPG | Rebounds per game | APG | Assists per game | SPG | Steals per game |
| BPG | Blocks per game | PPG | Points per game | **Bold** | Career high |

=== ABA ===
==== Regular season ====
| Year | Team | GP | MPG | FG% | 3P% | FT% | RPG | APG | PPG |
|---|---|---|---|---|---|---|---|---|---|
| 1967–68 | Pittsburgh | 9 | 7.2 | .286 | **1.000** | **.500** | .7 | .6 | 1.8 |
| 1967–68 | Anaheim | **32** | **13.6** | **.326** | .200 | .488 | **2.1** | **1.3** | **3.6** |
| Career | | 41 | 12.2 | .321 | .231 | .489 | 1.8 | 1.1 | 3.2 |
