= Steve Kramer =

Steve Kramer may refer to:

- Steve Kramer (actor), American voice actor for many anime titles
- Steve Kramer (basketball) (born 1945), American basketball player
- Steve Kramer, musician with The Wallets

== See also ==
- Stefan Kramer (disambiguation)
- Steven Cramer (born 1953), American poet
