= Bill Allen (basketball) =

American basketball player

Personal information
- Born: 1945 (age 80–81)
- Listed height: 6 ft 8 in (2.03 m)
- Listed weight: 205 lb (93 kg)

Career information
- High school: Manual Arts (Los Angeles, California)
- College: New Mexico State (1972–1976)
- NBA draft: 1967: undrafted
- Position: Power forward / center
- Number: 30, 35

Career history
- 1968: Anaheim Amigos
- Stats at Basketball Reference

Bill Allen (born 1945) is an American former basketball player who played one season in the American Basketball Association (ABA).

Allen played collegiately for New Mexico State University. In the 1967–68 season, he played 38 games in the American Basketball Association for the Anaheim Amigos.

== Career statistics ==
Legend
GP	Games played	GS	Games started	MPG	Minutes per game
FG%	Field goal percentage	3P%	3-point field goal percentage	FT%	Free throw percentage
RPG	Rebounds per game	APG	Assists per game	SPG	Steals per game
BPG	Blocks per game	PPG	Points per game	**Bold**	Career high

=== ABA ===
==== Regular season ====
Year	Team	GP	MPG	FG%	3P%	FT%	RPG	APG	PPG
1967–68	Anaheim	38	22.6	.429	1.000	.586	7.1	.6	7.9
