= Larry Moore (basketball) =

American basketball player

Personal information
- Born: July 10, 1942 South Bend, Indiana, U.S.
- Died: March 12, 2016 (aged 73) Mountain Iron, Minnesota, U.S.
- Listed height: 6 ft 4 in (1.93 m)
- Listed weight: 205 lb (93 kg)

Career information
- High school: John Adams (South Bend, Indiana)
- College: Florida State (1967–1968)
- NBA draft: 1968: undrafted
- Position: Forward
- Number: 50

Career history
- 1968: Anaheim Amigos
- Stats at Basketball Reference

Lawrence E. Moore (July 10, 1942 – March 12, 2016) was an American professional basketball player. He played for the American Basketball Association's Anaheim Amigos during the 1967–68 season.

Moore is a native of South Bend, Indiana. He entered the United States Navy after high school, and after serving he enrolled in Florida State University. Moore was on the basketball team at the Seminoles.

Moore died on March 12, 2016, at his home in Mountain Iron, Minnesota.
