= Stefan Kramer =

Stefan Kramer may refer to:

- Stefan Krämer (born 1966), German football coach
- Stefan Kramer (impressionist) (born 1982), Chilean impressionist, comedian and actor

== See also ==
- Steve Kramer (disambiguation)
- Steven Cramer (born 1953), American poet
