= John Fairchild =

American basketball player

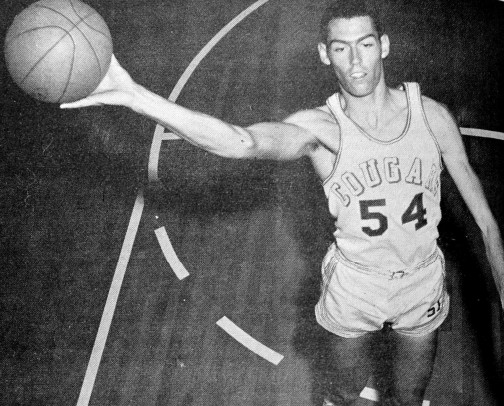

Personal information
- Born: April 28, 1943 (age 83) Encinitas, California, U.S.
- Listed height: 6 ft 8 in (2.03 m)
- Listed weight: 205 lb (93 kg)

Career information
- High school: San Dieguito (Encinitas, California)
- College: Palomar College (1962–1963); BYU (1963–1965)
- NBA draft: 1965: 2nd round, 16th overall pick
- Drafted by: Los Angeles Lakers
- Playing career: 1965–1970
- Position: Small forward
- Number: 33, 24, 12, 30, 25

Career history
- 1965–1966: Los Angeles Lakers
- 1967–1968: Anaheim Amigos
- 1968: Denver Rockets
- 1968–1969: Indiana Pacers
- 1969–1970: Kentucky Colonels

Career highlights
- Third-team All-American – NABC (1965); 2× First-team All-WAC (1964, 1965)

Career NBA and ABA statistics
- Points: 1,085 (6.6 ppg)
- Rebounds: 523 (3.2 rpg)
- Assists: 115 (0.7 apg)
- Stats at NBA.com
- Stats at Basketball Reference

John Russell Fairchild (born April 28, 1943) is an American former basketball player.

Born in Encinitas, California, Fairchild played high school basketball at San Dieguito High School (class of 1961) and college basketball at Brigham Young University. In two years at BYU, he averaged 20.9 points and 12.8 rebounds per game, and was named WAC Player of the Year in his senior season.

Fairchild was drafted by the Los Angeles Lakers with the 8th pick of the 2nd round (16th overall pick) of the 1965 NBA draft. He played for the Lakers during the 1965–66 NBA season.

Fairchild later played in the American Basketball Association as a 6'8" forward for the Anaheim Amigos (1967–68), averaging 10.9 points per game. Fairchild later played for the Denver Rockets (1968–69 season), Indiana Pacers (1968–69 and 1969–1970 seasons) and Kentucky Colonels (1969–1970 season). He was a member of the Pacers team that was the ABA runner-up in 1969 and the subsequent team that won the 1970 ABA Championship.

== Career statistics ==
Legend
GP	Games played	GS	Games started	MPG	Minutes per game
FG%	Field goal percentage	3P%	3-point field goal percentage	FT%	Free throw percentage
RPG	Rebounds per game	APG	Assists per game	SPG	Steals per game
BPG	Blocks per game	PPG	Points per game	**Bold**	Career high

=== NBA/ABA ===
==== Regular season ====
Year	Team	GP	MPG	FG%	3P%	FT%	RPG	APG	PPG
1965–66	L.A. Lakers	30	5.7	.258		.700	1.5	.4	2.0
1967–68	Anaheim (ABA)	**62**	**21.1**	**.437**	.250	.675	**5.4**	**1.0**	10.9
1968–69	Denver (ABA)	11	12.3	.353	–	.667	1.6	.8	3.6
1968–69	Indiana (ABA)	52	11.2	.388	.345	**.709**	2.1	.5	5.5
1969–70	Indiana (ABA)	3	8.7	.167	–	.500	3.0	.7	1.0
1969–70	Kentucky (ABA)	7	7.4	.353	**.600**	.500	1.1	.3	2.7
Career (ABA)		135	15.6	.417	.368	.680	3.5	.8	7.6
Career (overall)		165	13.8	.404	.368	.681	3.2	.7	6.6

==== Playoffs ====
Year	Team	GP	MPG	FG%	3P%	FT%	RPG	APG	PPG
1969	Indiana (ABA)	9	9.4	.432	.400	.667	2.3	.3	5.1
