= Bob Sims (basketball, born 1938) =

American basketball player

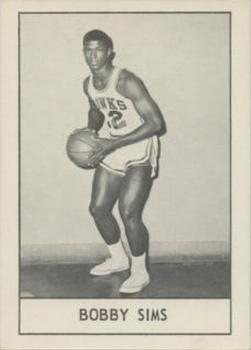

Personal information
- Born: October 9, 1938
- Died: March 21, 2006 (aged 67)
- Listed height: 6 ft 5 in (1.96 m)
- Listed weight: 220 lb (100 kg)

Career information
- High school: Jordan (Los Angeles, California)
- College: Pepperdine (1957–1960)
- NBA draft: 1960: 7th round, 54th overall pick
- Drafted by: St. Louis Hawks
- Position: Shooting guard
- Number: 12

Career history
- 1960–1961: Kirby's Shoes
- 1961: Los Angeles Lakers
- 1961–1962: St. Louis Hawks
- 1968: Anaheim Amigos
- Stats at NBA.com
- Stats at Basketball Reference

Robert Antell Sims Jr. (October 9, 1938 – March 21, 2006) was an American professional basketball player in both the National Basketball Association (NBA) and American Basketball Association (ABA). Sims was selected in the 1960 NBA draft by the St. Louis Hawks after a collegiate career at Pepperdine University. In his NBA/ABA career, Sims averaged 7.7 points, 2.7 rebounds and 2.3 assists per game.

== Career statistics ==
Legend
GP	Games played	GS	Games started	MPG	Minutes per game
FG%	Field goal percentage	3P%	3-point field goal percentage	FT%	Free throw percentage
RPG	Rebounds per game	APG	Assists per game	SPG	Steals per game
BPG	Blocks per game	PPG	Points per game	**Bold**	Career high

=== NBA/ABA ===
==== Regular season ====
Year	Team	GP	MPG	FG%	3P%	FT%	RPG	APG	PPG
1961–62	L.A. Lakers	19	9.0	.373		.487	1.4	.6	3.3
1961–62	St. Louis	**46**	**25.5**	**.396**		.588	**3.4**	**3.1**	**9.7**
1967–68	Anaheim (ABA)	2	9.5	.286	–	**.667**	.5	1.0	4.0
Career (NBA)		65	20.7	.393		.569	2.8	2.4	7.8
Career (overall)		67	20.4	.392	–	.572	2.7	2.3	7.7
