= Dick Lee (basketball) =

American basketball player and public relations worker

Personal information
- Listed height: 6 ft 6 in (1.98 m)

Career information
- High school: Ballard (Seattle, Washington)
- College: Washington (1962–1965)
- NBA draft: 1965: undrafted
- Position: Forward

Career history
- 1968: Anaheim Amigos
- Stats at Basketball Reference

Richard Lee was a public relations worker for the Anaheim Amigos of the American Basketball Association during the 1967–68 season. He eventually found himself on the Amigos' active playing roster as the team struggled with finances and injuries.

The Anaheim Amigos were one of the least successful teams in the ABA. Attendance at their games was rumored to dip into double-digits, and the team ultimately lost about $500,000 before being sold and moved to Los Angeles. Injuries struck the Amigos towards the end of the 1967–68 season, but the team was so strapped financially that they could not sign any established basketballers as replacements. In order to have a full roster, team owner Art Kim decided to activate PR man Dick Lee as a player. Though Lee was not expected to receive any playing time, the Amigos coach was forced to use him in two games because Lee's teammates were in foul trouble. Playing at the forward position, Lee grabbed one rebound and is credited with one assist. Lee played college basketball at the University of Washington.

== Career statistics ==
Legend
GP	Games played	GS	Games started	MPG	Minutes per game
FG%	Field goal percentage	3P%	3-point field goal percentage	FT%	Free throw percentage
RPG	Rebounds per game	APG	Assists per game	SPG	Steals per game
BPG	Blocks per game	PPG	Points per game	**Bold**	Career high

=== ABA ===
==== Regular season ====
Year	Team	GP	MPG	FG%	3P%	FT%	RPG	APG	PPG
1967–68	Anaheim	2	1.0	–	–	–	.5	.5	.0
