= Andrew Anderson (basketball) =

American basketball player (1945–2019)

Personal information
- Born: June 6, 1945 Buffalo, New York, U.S.
- Died: June 17, 2019 (aged 74) Tallahassee, Florida, U.S.
- Listed height: 6 ft 2 in (1.88 m)
- Listed weight: 184 lb (83 kg)

Career information
- High school: Maryvale (Cheektowaga, New York)
- College: Canisius (1964–1967)
- NBA draft: 1967: 8th round, 88th overall pick
- Drafted by: Boston Celtics
- Playing career: 1967–1970
- Position: Point guard / shooting guard
- Number: 13, 44, 23, 40

Career history
- 1967–1968: Oakland Oaks
- 1968–1969: Miami Floridians
- 1969–1970: Los Angeles Stars
- Stats at Basketball Reference

Andrew Emil Anderson (July 6, 1945 – June 17, 2019) was an American basketball player.

He played collegiately for Canisius College.

He was selected by the Boston Celtics in the 8th round (88th pick overall) of the 1967 NBA draft.

He played for the Oakland Oaks (1967–69), Miami Floridians (1969) and Los Angeles Stars (1969–70) in the ABA for 194 games. In the first ever game played in the ABA on October 13, 1967, Anderson scored 33 points to lead both teams in scoring as the Oaks won 134–129 over the Anaheim Amigos.

Anderson died on June 17, 2019, in Tallahassee, Florida. He was 74 years old.
