= Bob Bedell =

American basketball player (1944–2015)

Personal information
- Born: June 26, 1944 Los Angeles, California, U.S.
- Died: June 14, 2015 (aged 70)
- Listed height: 6 ft 7 in (2.01 m)
- Listed weight: 205 lb (93 kg)

Career information
- High school: Bell Gardens (Bell Gardens, California)
- College: Stanford (1963–1966)
- NBA draft: 1966: 10th round, 90th overall pick
- Drafted by: Philadelphia 76ers
- Playing career: 1967–1971
- Position: Power forward
- Number: 22

Career history
- 1967–1968: Anaheim Amigos
- 1968–1971: Dallas/Texas Chaparrals

Career highlights
- First-team All-AAWU (1965); Second-team All-AAWU (1966)

Career ABA statistics
- Points: 2,257
- Rebounds: 1,386
- Assists: 320
- Stats at Basketball Reference

Robert George Bedell (June 26, 1944 – June 14, 2015) was an American basketball player.

Born in Los Angeles, California, he attended Bell Gardens High School, played collegiately for Stanford University, and was selected by the Philadelphia 76ers in the 10th round (90th overall) of the 1966 NBA draft.

He played for the Anaheim Amigos (1967–68), Dallas/Texas Chaparrals (1968–71) in the American Basketball Association for 269 games.

Bedell died on June 14, 2015, at the age of 70.
