= Randy Stoll =

American basketball player

Personal information
- Born: 1945 (age 80–81) Seattle, Washington, U.S.
- Listed height: 6 ft 7 in (2.01 m)
- Listed weight: 235 lb (107 kg)

Career information
- High school: Bellevue (Bellevue, Washington)
- College: Washington State (1964–1967)
- NBA draft: 1967: undrafted
- Position: Power forward
- Number: 44

Career history
- 1967–1968: Anaheim Amigos
- Stats at Basketball Reference

Randy C. Stoll (born 1945 in Seattle, Washington) is an American former basketball player.

Stoll played college basketball at Washington State University. While at Washington State, Stoll was leading the Cougars in scoring in his sophomore season before becoming academically ineligible at mid-season and sitting out the 1965–66 season. He played the 1966–67 season as a redshirt junior, averaging 11 points and 6.3 rebounds per game. Following the season, he chose to leave school for professional basketball.

A 6'7" power forward, Stoll played for the Anaheim Amigos during the 1967-68 American Basketball Association season. He averaged 5.7 points per game.
