= Paul Scranton =

American basketball player

Personal information
- Born: April 30, 1944 (age 82) Los Angeles, California, U.S.
- Listed height: 6 ft 5 in (1.96 m)
- Listed weight: 230 lb (104 kg)

Career information
- High school: Jordan (Los Angeles, California)
- College: Cal Poly Pomona (1962–1966)
- NBA draft: 1966: undrafted
- Position: Forward
- Number: 50

Career history
- 1966–1967: New Haven Elms
- 1967: Anaheim Amigos

Career highlights
- Third-team Little College All-American – AP (1966)
- Stats at Basketball Reference

Paul Earl Scranton Jr. (born April 30, 1944) is an American former professional basketball player who played in the American Basketball Association (ABA) for the Anaheim Amigos. Paul was an All-American college basketball player.

Scranton appeared in five games and scored nine points.

In the preseason, Scranton averaged 17 points and 15 rebounds in the ABA. Later on he unfortunately got injured and therefore couldn't continue in any other games until later playing in international basketball leagues.
