= Willis Thomas =

American basketball player

Personal information
- Born: 1937 (age 88–89)
- Listed height: 6 ft 2 in (1.88 m)
- Listed weight: 185 lb (84 kg)

Career information
- High school: Jefferson (Los Angeles, California)
- College: LA Harbor College; Tennessee A&I State
- Playing career: 1967–1968
- Position: Shooting guard
- Number: 20, 10

Career history
- 1967: Denver Rockets
- 1967–1968: Anaheim Amigos

Career highlights
- Third-team Parade All-American (1958)

Career ABA statistics
- Points: 555 (9.0 ppg)
- Rebounds: 114 (1.8 rpg)
- Assists: 55 (0.9 apg)
- Stats at Basketball Reference

Willis "Lefty" Thomas (born 1937) is an American former professional basketball player. A 6'2" guard from LA Harbor College, Thomas played in the American Basketball Association during the 1967–68 season. He started the season with Denver Rockets and scored 39 points in his debut. In December 1967, he was traded to the Anaheim Amigos for Jeff Congdon. In 62 games he totaled 555 points and 55 assists. Prior to him joining the ABA, he played for the Harlem Clowns and other teams that regularly faced the Harlem Globetrotters.

In 1958, he led the Jefferson Democrats to the Los Angeles City High School title. For the season he averaged 21.5 points per game, never scoring under 15 points in a game. He was named the City Co-Player of the Year with Bill McGill.
