= Bill Crow (basketball) =

American basketball player

Personal information
- Born: December 9, 1940 (age 85) Los Angeles, California, U.S.
- Listed height: 6 ft 1 in (1.85 m)
- Listed weight: 180 lb (82 kg)

Career information
- High school: Downey (Downey, California)
- College: Cerritos (1960–1961); BYU (1961–1962); Westminster (1963–1964)
- NBA draft: 1964: undrafted
- Position: Guard
- Number: 14

Career history
- 1967: Anaheim Amigos
- Stats at Basketball Reference

William R. Crow (born December 9, 1940) is an American former professional basketball player who spent one season in the American Basketball Association (ABA) with the Anaheim Amigos during the 1967–68 season. He attended Cerritos College, Brigham Young University, and Westminster College of Utah. In 1961, he was an all-Western State Conference honorable mention.
