= Bill Garner (basketball) =

American basketball player

Personal information
- Born: June 17, 1940 East St. Louis, Illinois, U.S.
- Died: 5th April 2014
- Listed height: 6 ft 10 in (2.08 m)
- Listed weight: 220 lb (100 kg)

Career information
- High school: East St. Louis (East St. Louis, Illinois)
- College: Portland (1959–1962)
- NBA draft: 1962: 8th round, 68th overall pick
- Drafted by: Los Angeles Lakers
- Position: Center
- Number: 42

Career history
- 1962: Long Beach Chiefs
- 1967–1968: Anaheim Amigos
- Stats at Basketball Reference

Bill Garner (born June 17, 1940 - April 5, 2014) was an American basketball player.

Born in East St. Louis, Illinois, Garner played college basketball at the University of Portland. A 6'10" center, Garner was drafted by the Los Angeles Lakers in the eighth round (8th pick, 68th overall) of the 1962 NBA draft.

Following his college career, Garner played professionally for the Long Beach Chiefs of the American Basketball League until the league ceased operations after the 1962–63 season. From 1963 to 1966 Garner played for the Harlem Globetrotters. He later played for the Anaheim Amigos during the 1967–68 season in the American Basketball Association.
