= Art Kim =

Art Kim (born c. 1912/1913, died after 1988) was an American basketball executive.

Kim was a Korean-American, born on Maui, Hawaii, who was a college basketball player, AAU administrator, and team owner.

Kim was involved with the Washington Generals and owned the Hawaii Chiefs and Long Beach Chiefs of the American Basketball League before becoming the owner of the Anaheim Amigos of the American Basketball Association. In the Amigos' first season in the new ABA Kim had the team open the season with a six-game, 13 day road trip, because ABA teams at the time shared gate receipts and Kim wanted to play in as many teams' first home games as possible. During that first season, Kim fired head coach Al Brightman after a 13–24 start, promoting him to public relations director and replacing him with Harry Dinnel. Art Kim also initiated the 3 point shot, which the NBA called a gimmick and said it would never adopt it.

In 1973, Kim became a teacher, which he did for over ten years even after he turned 70.
