= 1960 NBA draft =

Basketball player selection

General information
- Sport: Basketball
- Date: April 11, 1960
- Location: Roosevelt Hotel (New York City, New York)
- Network: NBC

Overview
- 100 total selections in 21 rounds
- League: NBA
- Teams: 8
- Territorial picks: Oscar Robertson, Cincinnati Royals
- First selection: Oscar Robertson, Cincinnati Royals
- Hall of Famers: 3: G Oscar Robertson; G Jerry West; G Lenny Wilkens

The 1960 NBA draft was the 14th annual draft of the National Basketball Association (NBA). The draft was held on April 11, 1960, before the 1960–61 season. In this draft, eight NBA teams took turns selecting amateur U.S. college basketball players. A player who had finished his four-year college eligibility was eligible for selection. If a player left college early, he would not be eligible for selection until his college class graduated. In each round, the teams select in reverse order of their win–loss record in the previous season. Before the draft, a team could forfeit its first-round draft pick and then select any player from within a 50-mile radius of its home arena as their territorial pick. The Minneapolis Lakers participated in the draft, but relocated to Los Angeles and became the Los Angeles Lakers prior to the start of the season. The draft consisted of 21 rounds comprising 100 players selected.

== Draft selections and draftee career notes ==
Oscar Robertson from the University of Cincinnati was selected before the draft as Cincinnati Royals' territorial pick. He went on to win the Rookie of the Year Award in his first season. Jerry West from West Virginia University was selected second by the Minneapolis Lakers. Three players from this draft, Robertson, West and 6th pick Lenny Wilkens, have been inducted to the Basketball Hall of Fame. They were also named in the 50 Greatest Players in NBA History list announced at the league's 50th anniversary in 1996.

Robertson's achievements include an NBA championship with the Milwaukee Bucks in 1971, Most Valuable Player Award in 1964, 11 All-NBA Team selections and 12 All-Star Game selections. West played 14 seasons with the Lakers, winning the NBA championship in 1972. He was also selected to 12 consecutive All-NBA Teams and 14 consecutive All-Star Games. He later coached the Lakers for three seasons. Wilkens' achievements include 9 All-Star Game selections. After his playing career, he became a successful head coach. He won the NBA championship in 1979 with the Seattle SuperSonics and the Coach of the Year Award in 1994. He held the record for most games as a head coach in the NBA, with 2,487 games coached. He was inducted to the Basketball Hall of Fame as a coach in 1998. He became the third man to be inducted as a player and as a coach, after John Wooden and Bill Sharman. Two players from this draft, 3rd pick Darrall Imhoff and 5th pick Lee Shaffer, have also been selected to an All-Star Game. Tom Sanders, the 8th pick, won 8 NBA championships with the Boston Celtics in the 1960s. He later briefly coached the Celtics in 1978. Al Attles, the 39th pick, also had a coaching career. He coached the San Francisco/Golden State Warriors for 14 seasons, winning the NBA championship in 1975.

== Key ==
Pos.	G	F	C
Position	Guard	Forward	Center

^	Denotes player who has been inducted to the Naismith Memorial Basketball Hall of Fame
^{+}	Denotes player who has been selected for at least one All-Star Game
^{#}	Denotes player who has never appeared in an NBA regular-season or playoff game
^{~}	Denotes player who has been selected as Rookie of the Year

== Draft ==
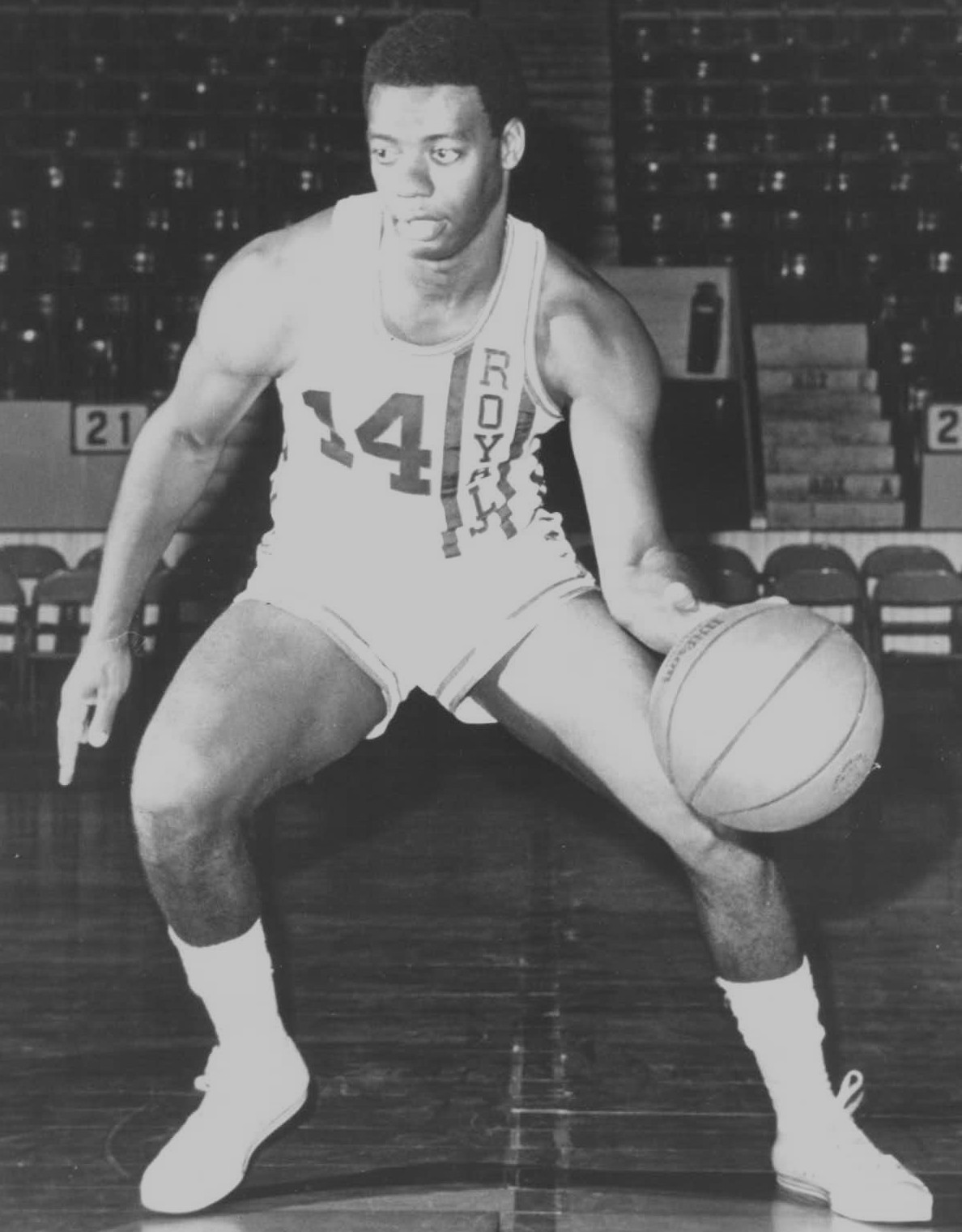
Oscar Robertson was selected first overall by the Cincinnati Royals.

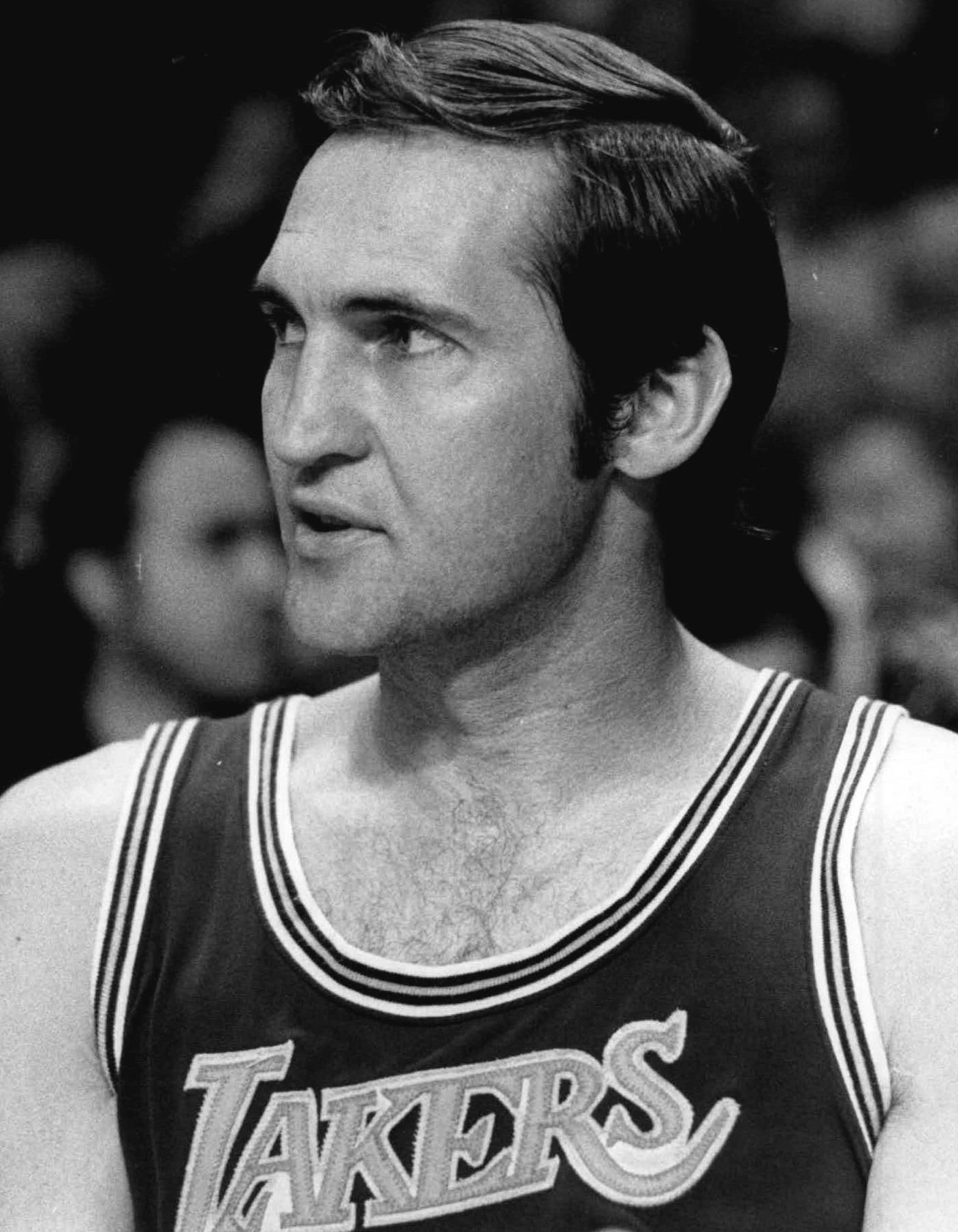
Jerry West was selected second overall by the Minneapolis Lakers.

Round	Pick	Player	Position	Nationality	Team	School/club team
T/1	1	Oscar Robertson^^{~}	G/F	United States	Cincinnati Royals	Cincinnati
1	2	Jerry West^	G/F	United States	Minneapolis Lakers	West Virginia
1	3	Darrall Imhoff^{+}	C	United States	New York Knicks	California
1	4	Jackie Moreland	G/F	United States	Detroit Pistons	Louisiana Tech
1	5	Lee Shaffer^{+}	F	United States	Syracuse Nationals	North Carolina
1	6	Lenny Wilkens^	G	United States	St. Louis Hawks	Providence
1	7	Al Bunge^{#}	F	United States	Philadelphia Warriors	Maryland
1	8	Satch Sanders	F	United States	Boston Celtics	NYU
2	9	Jay Arnette	G	United States	Cincinnati Royals	Texas
2	10	Dave Budd	F	United States	New York Knicks (from Minneapolis)^{[a]}	Wake Forest
2	11	Kelly Coleman^{#}	F	United States	New York Knicks	Kentucky Wesleyan
2	12	Ron Johnson	F	United States	Detroit Pistons	Minnesota
2	13	Wilbur Trosch^{#}	C	United States	Syracuse Nationals	Saint Francis (PA)
2	14	Frank Radovich	F	United States	St. Louis Hawks	Indiana
2	15	Bill Kennedy	G	United States	Philadelphia Warriors	Temple
2	16	Leroy Wright^{#}	F	United States	Boston Celtics	Pacific

== Other picks ==
The following list includes other draft picks who have appeared in at least one NBA game.

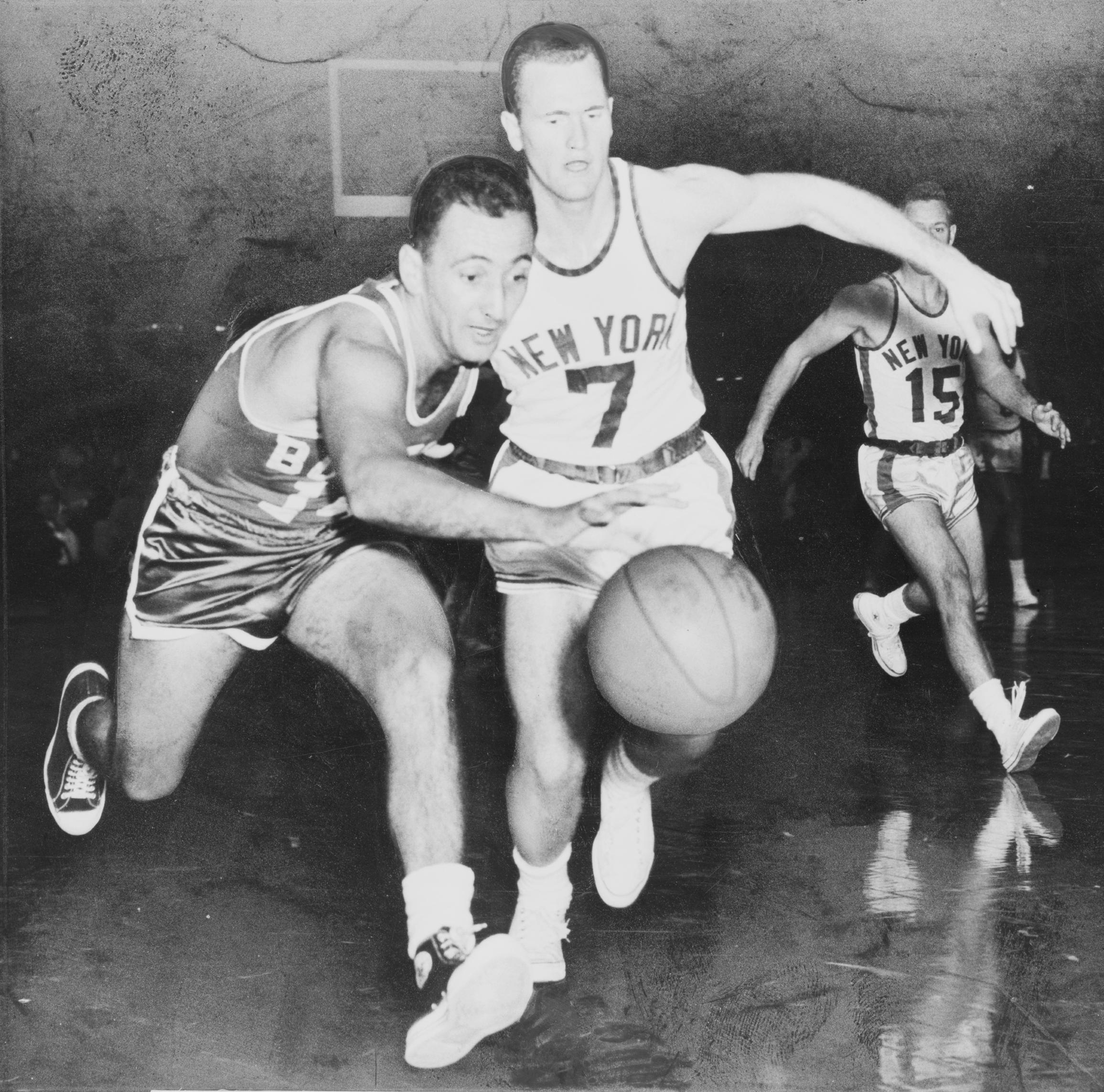
Bob McNeill (middle) was selected 19th overall by the New York Knicks.

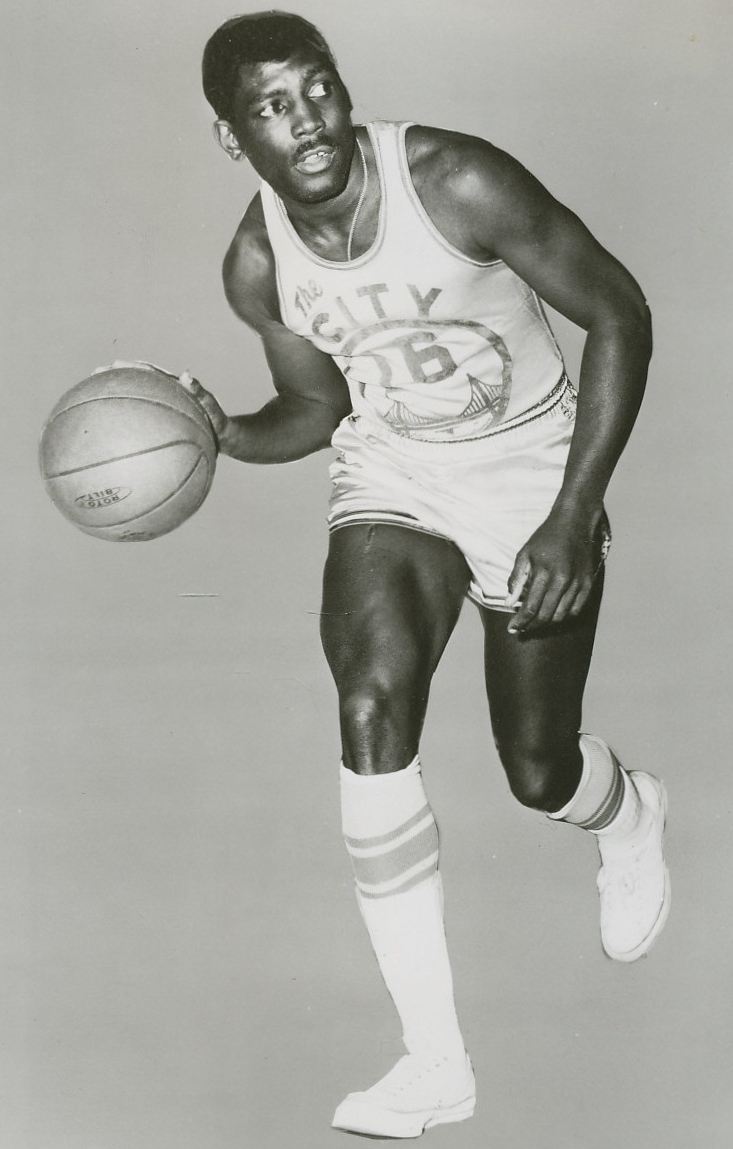
Al Attles was selected 39th overall by the Philadelphia Warriors.

Round	Pick	Player	Position	Nationality	Team	School/club team
3	17	Ralph Davis	G	United States	Cincinnati Royals	Cincinnati
3	19	Bob McNeill	G	United States	New York Knicks	Saint Joseph's
3	21	Joe Roberts	F	United States	Syracuse Nationals	Ohio State
3	22	Fred LaCour	G/F	United States	St. Louis Hawks	San Francisco
4	27	Ben Warley	G/F	United States	Minneapolis Lakers (from New York)^{[a]}	Tennessee State
4	30	Horace Walker	F	United States	St. Louis Hawks	Michigan State
5	36	Willie Jones	G	United States	Detroit Pistons	Northwestern
5	38	Jimmy Darrow	G	United States	St. Louis Hawks	Bowling Green
5	39	Al Attles	G	United States	Philadelphia Warriors	North Carolina A&T
6	46	York Larese	G	United States	St. Louis Hawks	North Carolina
7	50	Howie Jolliff	F/C	United States	Minneapolis Lakers	Ohio
7	54	Bob Sims	G/F	United States	St. Louis Hawks	Pepperdine
8	56	Sam Stith	G	United States	Cincinnati Royals	St. Bonaventure
11	78	Mel Peterson	G/F	United States	Detroit Pistons	Wheaton

== Trades ==
- ^{a 1} ^{2} On January 24, 1960, the New York Knicks acquired Dick Garmaker and a second-round pick from the Los Angeles Lakers in exchange for Ray Felix and a fourth-round pick. The Knicks used the pick to draft Dave Budd. The Lakers used the pick to draft Ben Warley.

== See also ==
- List of first overall NBA draft picks
