= Ben Warley =

American basketball player

Personal information
- Born: September 4, 1936 Washington, D.C., U.S.
- Died: April 5, 2002 (aged 65) Philadelphia, Pennsylvania, U.S.
- Listed height: 6 ft 5 in (1.96 m)
- Listed weight: 200 lb (91 kg)

Career information
- High school: Phelps Vocational (Washington, D.C.)
- College: Tennessee State (1957–1960)
- NBA draft: 1961: 1st round, 6th overall pick
- Drafted by: Syracuse Nationals
- Playing career: 1960–1974, 1980
- Position: Small forward / shooting guard
- Number: 14, 33, 40, 44

Career history
- 1960–1962: Cleveland Pipers
- 1962–1963: Long Beach Chiefs
- 1963–1965: Syracuse Nationals / Philadelphia 76ers
- 1965–1967: Baltimore Bullets
- 1967–1969: Anaheim Amigos / Los Angeles Stars
- 1969–1970: Denver Rockets
- 1970–1971: Camden Bullets
- 1971–1972: Wilkes-Barre Barons
- 1972–1973: Hazleton Bullets
- 1973–1974: Cherry Hill Rookies
- 1980: Philadelphia Kings

Career highlights
- NIBL champion (1961); ABL champion (1962); ABA All-Star (1968); All-EBA First Team (1971)

Career NBA and ABA statistics
- Points: 3,686 (8.4 ppg)
- Rebounds: 2,436 (5.6 rpg)
- Assists: 356 (0.8 apg)
- Stats at NBA.com
- Stats at Basketball Reference

Benjamin Vallentina Warley (September 4, 1936 – April 5, 2002) was an American professional basketball player.

A 6'5" forward/guard from Tennessee State University, Warley played five seasons (1962–1967) in the National Basketball Association as a member of the Syracuse Nationals, Philadelphia 76ers, and Baltimore Bullets. He averaged 8.4 points per game and 5.6 rebounds per game. Warley later played with several teams in the American Basketball Association, representing the Anaheim Amigos in the 1968 ABA All-Star Game.

Warley played in the Eastern Basketball Association (EBA) for the Camden Bullets, Wilkes-Barre Barons, Hazleton Bullets and Cherry Hill Rookies from 1970 to 1974. He was selected to the All-EBA First Team in 1971.

Warley settled in Philadelphia after his playing career was over. He served as an assistant coach for the Philadelphia Kings of the Continental Basketball Association under head coach Hal Greer. On December 27, 1980, Warley was activated as a player in a game due to a shortage of Kings players; he scored 4 points in 12 minutes.

Warley died of liver cancer in 2002.

== Career statistics ==
Legend
GP	Games played	GS	Games started	MPG	Minutes per game
FG%	Field goal percentage	3P%	3-point field goal percentage	FT%	Free throw percentage
RPG	Rebounds per game	APG	Assists per game	SPG	Steals per game
BPG	Blocks per game	PPG	Points per game	**Bold**	Career high

=== NBA/ABA ===
==== Regular season ====
Year	Team	GP	MPG	FG%	3P%	FT%	RPG	APG	PPG
1962–63	Syracuse	26	7.9	**.450**		.714	3.3	.2	4.8
1963–64	Philadelphia	**79**	22.0	.435		.721	7.8	.9	8.2
1964–65	Philadelphia	64	14.1	.372		.705	4.3	.8	4.9
1965–66	Philadelphia	1	6.0	.333		–	2.0	.0	2.0
1965–66	Baltimore	56	13.7	.409		.660	3.8	.4	5.3
1966–67	Baltimore	62	16.7	.401		.788	5.2	.8	6.2
1967–68	Anaheim (ABA)	71	**32.4**	.442	**.313**	**.805**	**8.6**	**1.4**	**17.4**
1968–69	L.A. Stars (ABA)	35	25.0	.407	.256	.748	5.5	.7	14.0
1969–70	Denver (ABA)	42	11.3	.353	.259	.763	2.6	.7	4.6
Career (NBA)		288	16.2	.413		.724	5.3	.7	6.1
Career (ABA)		148	24.6	.423	.284	.785	6.2	1.0	13.0
Career (overall)		436	19.0	.418	.284	.751	5.6	.8	8.5
All-Star (ABA)		1	17.0	.286	.000	1.000	1.0	3.0	8.0

==== Playoffs ====
Year	Team	GP	MPG	FG%	3P%	FT%	RPG	APG	PPG
1963	Syracuse	2	4.5	.000		.500	1.5	.0	1.0
1964	Philadelphia	4	**21.3**	.391		.667	**8.3**	.5	**7.0**
1965	Philadelphia	2	3.0	.000		–	.5	.5	.0
1966	Baltimore	2	4.5	.000		**1.000**	1.0	.0	.5
1970	Denver (ABA)	**10**	12.9	.421	.438	.600	2.9	**1.1**	4.5
Career (NBA)		10	10.9	.281		.650	3.9	.3	3.1
Career (overall)		20	11.9	.357	.438	.633	3.4	.7	3.8
