= Steve Kramer (basketball) =

American basketball player

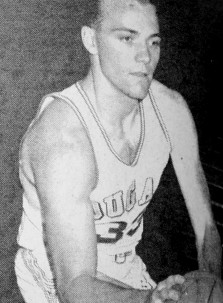

Personal information
- Born: January 1, 1945 (age 81) Sandy, Utah, U.S.
- Listed height: 6 ft 5 in (1.96 m)
- Listed weight: 200 lb (91 kg)

Career information
- High school: Sandy (Sandy, Utah)
- College: BYU (1963–1966)
- NBA draft: 1966: undrafted
- Position: Shooting guard
- Number: 32, 21, 33

Career history
- 1967–1968: Anaheim Amigos
- 1968–1970: Houston Mavericks / Carolina Cougars
- Stats at Basketball Reference

Steven P. Kramer (born January 1, 1945) is an American former basketball player.

Born and raised in Sandy, Utah, Kramer played college basketball at Brigham Young University.

As a 6'5" forward, Kramer played for the Anaheim Amigos (1967–68), Houston Mavericks (1968–69) and Carolina Cougars (1969–1970) in the American Basketball Association.
