= Bobby Joe Edmonds (basketball) =

American basketball player

Personal information
- Born: March 8, 1941 Indianapolis, Indiana, U.S.
- Died: November 12, 1991 (aged 50)
- Listed height: 6 ft 6 in (1.98 m)
- Listed weight: 220 lb (100 kg)

Career information
- High school: Crispus Attucks (Indianapolis, Indiana)
- College: Tennessee State (1961–1964)
- NBA draft: 1964: 6th round, 46th overall pick
- Drafted by: Baltimore Bullets
- Playing career: 1967–1970
- Position: Small forward
- Number: 44, 42

Career history
- 1967–1968, 1970: Indiana Pacers
- Stats at Basketball Reference

Bobby Joe Edmonds (March 8, 1941 – November 12, 1991) was an American professional basketball small forward for two seasons in the American Basketball Association (ABA) as a member of the Indiana Pacers (1967–68, 1969–70). He attended Tennessee State University.

He was drafted by the Baltimore Bullets in the 1964 NBA draft

He attended Indianapolis' Crispus Attucks High School, where he was part of the IHSAA State Championship basketball team in 1958–59.
