= Harry Dinnel =

American basketball player and coach

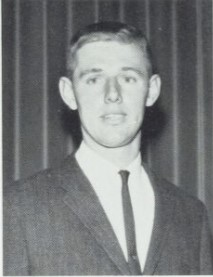
- Dinnel as a junior at Pepperdine

Personal information
- Born: October 9, 1940 Venice, California, U.S.
- Died: August 26, 2017 (aged 76)
- Listed height: 6 ft 4 in (1.93 m)
- Listed weight: 200 lb (91 kg)

Career information
- High school: Mira Costa (Manhattan Beach, California)
- College: El Camino College (1959–1960); Pepperdine (1960–1963)
- NBA draft: 1963: 8th round, 65th overall pick
- Drafted by: San Francisco Warriors
- Position: Small forward / shooting guard
- Number: 34

Career history
- 1967–1968: Anaheim Amigos

Career highlights
- WCC co-Player of the Year (1962); First-team All-WCC (1963); Second-team All-WCC (1962)
- Stats at Basketball Reference

Harry R. Dinnel Jr. (October 9, 1940 – August 26, 2017) was an American basketball player and coach.

Dinnel was born and died in Los Angeles, California.

Dinnel played basketball at Pepperdine University.

Dinnel was drafted in the 8th round of the 1963 NBA draft by the San Francisco Warriors.

Dinnel later played for, and then coached, the Anaheim Amigos of the American Basketball Association.

In 1981 Dinnel was inducted into the Pepperdine Athletics Hall of Fame.

== Career playing statistics ==
Legend
GP	Games played	GS	Games started	MPG	Minutes per game
FG%	Field goal percentage	3P%	3-point field goal percentage	FT%	Free throw percentage
RPG	Rebounds per game	APG	Assists per game	SPG	Steals per game
BPG	Blocks per game	PPG	Points per game	**Bold**	Career high

=== ABA ===
==== Regular season ====
Year	Team	GP	MPG	FG%	3P%	FT%	RPG	APG	PPG
1967–68	Anaheim	11	7.9	.316	–	.875	2.1	.5	1.7

== Head coaching record ==
Legend
Regular season	G	Games coached	W	Games won	L	Games lost	W–L %	Win–loss %
Playoffs	PG	Playoff games	PW	Playoff wins	PL	Playoff losses	PW–L %	Playoff win–loss %

Team	Year	G	W	L	W–L%	Finish	PG	PW	PL	PW–L%	Result
Anaheim	1967–68	42	13	29	.310	5th in Western	—	—	—	—	Missed playoffs
