= Dick Nemelka =

American basketball player (1943–2020)

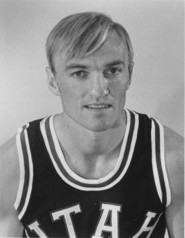

Personal information
- Born: October 1, 1943 Salt Lake City, Utah, U.S.
- Died: September 19, 2020 (aged 76) Salt Lake City, Utah, U.S.
- Listed height: 6 ft 0 in (1.83 m)
- Listed weight: 175 lb (79 kg)

Career information
- High school: West (Salt Lake City, Utah)
- College: BYU (1963–1966)
- NBA draft: 1966: 5th round, 44th overall pick
- Drafted by: St. Louis Hawks
- Position: Shooting guard
- Number: 11

Career history
- 1970–1971: Utah Stars

Career highlights
- ABA champion (1971); First-team All-American – USBWA (1966); Third-team All-American – NABC (1966); First-team All-WAC (1966); Second-team All-WAC (1965)
- Stats at Basketball Reference

Richard Samuel Nemelka (October 1, 1943 – September 19, 2020) was an American professional basketball player in the American Basketball Association (ABA). As a college player, he earned All-American recognition at Brigham Young University (BYU).

== Early life ==
Nemelka was born in Salt Lake City, Utah. He played basketball at Salt Lake City's West High School where he was an all-state selection. He also played shortstop on the varsity baseball team.

== College career ==
Nemelka played in thirteen games for the BYU Cougars freshman team, averaging 16.2 points per game.

Nemelka started every game for BYU his sophomore season, averaging 10.8 points per game.

In his junior season at BYU, Nemelka averaged 15.4 points per game as BYU finished 21-7 and won the Western Athletic Conference championship. He was also named to the All-WAC second team and was an Academic All-WAC selection.

As a junior at BYU, Nemelka averaged 24.0 points per game as BYU won the 1966 NIT. Nemelka was named as a first team All-American by the USBWA and a third team All-American by the NABC. He was also named to the All-WAC first-team and to the Academic All-Wac team.

== Professional career ==
Nemelka was drafted with the fourth pick in the fifth round of the 1966 NBA draft by the St. Louis Hawks (now based in Atlanta). However, he never played in the National Basketball Association. Nemelka played one season in the ABA for the Utah Stars, and averaged 5.5 points, 1.5 assists, and 1.5 rebounds per game. He played in nine playoff games for the Stars in the 1971 ABA playoffs, on the way to the Stars winning the 1971 ABA championship.

== Post-Playing career ==
Following his professional basketball career, Nemelka worked as an attorney in Utah. On May 13, 2008, the Chair of the Ethics and Discipline Committee of the Utah Supreme Court entered a public reprimand against Nemelka for the violation of three rules.

Nemelka died on September 19, 2020, at age 76 after a battle with cancer.
