= Kansas City (ABA) =

Former US basketball team

Kansas City, Missouri, was granted a charter franchise in the American Basketball Association in February 1967.

== History ==
Kansas City's first pro basketball team was the Kansas City Blues of the ill-fated Professional Basketball League of America in 1947; the league folded within a month, and the Blues played only six games. In 1961, the American Basketball League was formed; one of its teams were the Kansas City Steers, who qualified for the ABL's first (and only) championship series in 1962, which they lost to the Cleveland Pipers. The Steers and the ABL returned for the 1962–63 season, but the league folded on the very last day of 1962; the Steers, with a 22–9 record, were considered unofficial champions of the truncated season.

On February 2, 1967, the ABA was created with eleven charter teams, including an unnamed Kansas City franchise. The Kansas City team was awarded for $35,000 to James B. Trindle; on March 27, 1967, Vince Boryla was named general manager.

Unfortunately, the club had problems finding an arena to host their games in Kansas City. Municipal Auditorium, which had previously hosted both Blues and Steers games, had just been awarded a Central Hockey League franchise, which was to be the top farm club of the NHL's expansion St. Louis Blues, thus limiting its available home dates. So, on April 1, 1967, the team was relocated to Denver and named the Denver Larks.

Meanwhile, Trindle's financial problems led Boryla to resign; ultimately, the team was sold to J. William Ringsby and his son, who soon renamed the team the Denver Rockets in homage to his local trucking business, Ringsby Rocket Truck Lines. The Denver Rockets played in the ABA from 1967 through 1974, when they became the Denver Nuggets and played as such through the ABA's final two seasons. With the ABA–NBA merger in 1976, the Nuggets joined the National Basketball Association (NBA) and continue to play in that league to the present day, later winning an NBA Finals championship in 2023.

== Subsequent events ==
Professional basketball returned to Kansas City in 1972 when the Cincinnati Royals relocated there and became the Kansas City Kings. The Kings left for Sacramento, California, in 1985 and Kansas City has been without an NBA franchise since. The city has had several teams in the semi-pro, 21st-century version of the American Basketball Association, including the Kansas City Knights, who won the ABA crown in 2002.
