= Steven Cramer =

American poet

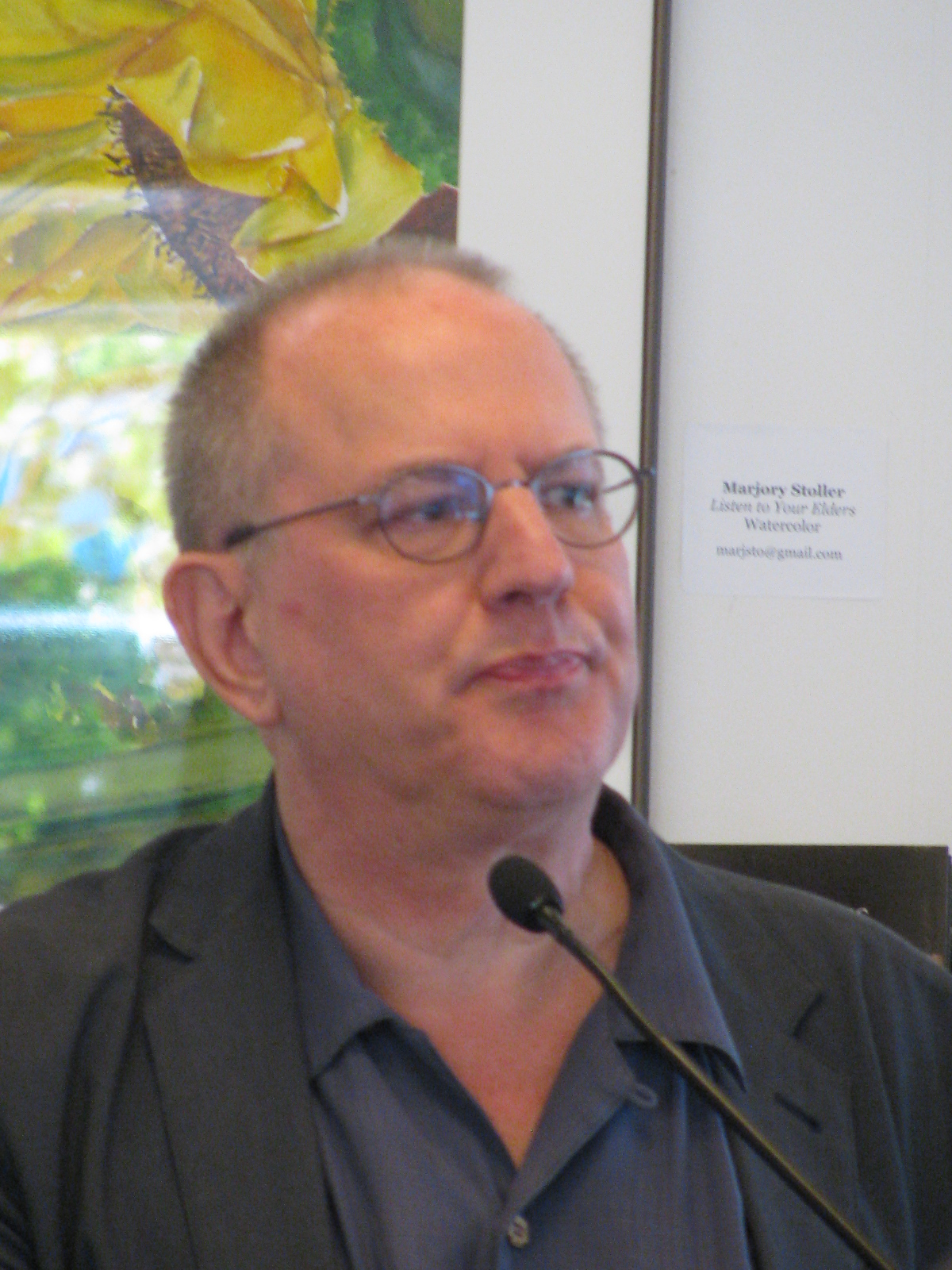
- Born: July 24, 1953 (age 73); Orange, New Jersey, United States
- Education: Antioch College; University of Iowa
- Occupation: Professor/Poet
- Writing career
- Genre: Poetry
- Notable works: Goodbye to the Orchard (2004), Clangings (2012), Listen (2020), Departures from Rilke (2023)
- Notable awards: National Endowment for the Arts, Massachusetts Cultural Council

Steven Cramer (born July 24, 1953 Orange, New Jersey) is an American poet.

== Life ==
He graduated from Antioch College, and University of Iowa.

He taught at Bennington College, Boston University, Massachusetts Institute of Technology, and Tufts University. He teaches at Lesley University.

His work appeared in Antioch Review, The Atlantic Monthly, The Nation, The New Republic, The Paris Review, Partisan Review, Poetry, Triquarterly, and New England Review.

== Family ==
He lives with his wife, Hilary, in Lexington, Massachusetts.

== Awards ==
- 2014 Massachusetts Cultural Council Artist Fellowship
- 2005 Sheila Motton Prize from the New England Poetry Club, for Goodbye to the Orchard
- 2005 Honor Book in Poetry by the Massachusetts Center for the Book, for Goodbye to the Orchard
- 2005 L.A. Times Book Prize Nominee, for Goodbye to the Orchard
- 1984 National Endowment for the Arts Fellowship
- 1983 Massachusetts Artists Foundation Fellowship

== Works ==
- The Eye that Desires to Look Upward. Galileo Press. 1987. ISBN 978-0-913123-11-9.
- The World Book. Copper Beech Press. 1992. ISBN 978-0-914278-59-7.
- Dialogue for the Left and Right Hand. Lumen Editions. 1997. ISBN 978-1-57129-033-5.
- Goodbye to the Orchard. Sarabande Books. 2004. ISBN 978-1-932511-05-5.
- Clangings. Sarabande Books. 2012. ISBN 978-1-936747-46-7.
- Listen . MadHat Press. 2020. 978-1-952335-08-2
- Departures from Rilke. Arrowsmith Press. 2023. ISBN 979-8-9879241-2-9

=== Reviews ===
- “Departures from Rilke is so many things: reenactments that verge on translation, the choreography of a poetry known so deep in the bones that it dances in the writer’s living room, a sort of thrashing with the original as Steven Cramer wrests Rilke into the 21st century. This book allows us to experience the poet’s mind shaped by a lifetime of inhabiting a set of poems that have provided specific and transcendent instruction to so many writers. That is why I find this book so very personal, unique, and delightful.”—Cate Marvin
- “This is what Rilke might have composed had he been born in the United States and been thoroughly conversant in the trends of contemporary poetics . . . so that each poem’s intention gains tremendous immediacy. [Cramer has] carried Rilke—not from German into English—but from one consciousness into another, to breathe in our atmosphere.”—Steven Ratiner, Red Letter Poems
- “In his sixth collection of poetry, Steven Cramer, founder of the Lesley University MFA program, looks at and through the fogs of memory and depression. In Listen, Cramer tries to distill a ‘bedlam of thought.’ He is, by turns, matter of fact, nailing the sometimes-funny sometimes-sad absurdity of the world. . . [a]nd warmly sensual.”—Nina McLaughlin, The Boston Globe
- “Wrenched word combinations arise out of using sound in this way: Obituary magi, greener chameleon, turquoise girls, blue-sprained boys, head’s high beams, glittering snow loaves, glister of venom, seraph cigarette . . . combinations that make our hearts beat faster, our synapses glow.”—Trena Machado, New Pages
- “[Clangings is] one of our favorite poetry books of 2012”—Memorious
- “Clangings is more than wordplay and clever riffs. . . . Language separates us, language connects us—our demise, our opportunity. Cramer’s book brings us full circle to self—who am I without language? Clangings reverberates.”—Lisa C. Krueger, Poets’ Quarterly
- "Steven Cramer's fourth book of poems, Goodbye to the Orchard, provides page after page of graceful inquisition and controlled musicality."—Shrode Hargis, Harvard Review
- "Cramer’s poems fight sentiment with our only available weapons: knowledge and integrity."—H.L. Hix, Ploughshares

=== Anthologies ===
- Daniel Lawless, ed. (2014). The Plume Anthology of Poetry. MadHat Press. ISBN 978-1941196168
- Annie Finch and Marie-Elizabeth Mali, eds. (2012). Villanelles. Knopf: Everyman's Library Pocket Poets Series. ISBN 978-0307957863
- Michael Simms, ed. (2001). The Autumn House Anthology of Contemporary American Poetry, 2nd Edition. Autumn House Press. ISBN 978-1932870480
- Sue Ellen Thompson, ed. (2005). The Autumn House Anthology of Contemporary American Poetry. Autumn House Press. ISBN 978-1-932870-06-0.
- Joseph Parisi; Stephen Young, eds. (2002). The Poetry Anthology, 1912-2002: ninety years of America's most distinguished verse magazine. Ivan R. Dee. ISBN 978-1-56663-468-7.
