= Jeff Congdon =

American basketball player (born 1943)

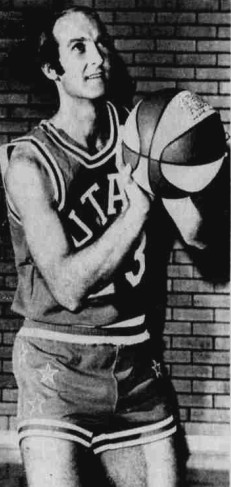

Personal information
- Born: October 17, 1943 (age 83) Elkhorn, Wisconsin, U.S.
- Listed height: 6 ft 1 in (1.85 m)
- Listed weight: 180 lb (82 kg)

Career information
- High school: Bolsa Grande (Garden Grove, California)
- College: BYU (1963–1966)
- NBA draft: 1966: 4th round, 32nd overall pick
- Drafted by: Detroit Pistons
- Playing career: 1967–1972
- Position: Point guard
- Number: 10, 14, 23, 4

Career history

Playing
- 1967–1968: Anaheim Amigos
- 1967–1970: Denver Rockets
- 1970–1971: Utah Stars
- 1970–1971: New York Nets
- 1971–1972: Dallas Chaparrals

Coaching
- 1982: Alberta Dusters
- Stats at Basketball Reference

Jeffrey D. Congdon (born October 17, 1943) is an American former professional basketball player and coach.

== Career ==
Congdon played college basketball at Brigham Young University with teammates Dick Nemelka and Craig Raymond. Congdon was selected by the Detroit Pistons in the fourth round (32nd pick overall) of the 1966 NBA draft.

A 6'1" guard, Congdon played for the Anaheim Amigos during part of the 1967–68 American Basketball Association season. Congdon played the remainder of that season with the Denver Rockets, and remained with Denver during the 1968–69 and 1969–70 seasons. Congdon spent the 1970–71 seasons with the Utah Stars (who won the 1971 ABA Championship, though he was traded midseason) and New York Nets. Congdon then joined the Dallas Chaparrals to finish out his professional career during the 1971–72 season.

On January 27, 1982, Congdon was appointed as head coach for the Alberta Dusters of the Continental Basketball Association (CBA). He compiled a 3–16 record during his tenure.
