= Steve Chubin =

American basketball player

Personal information
- Born: February 8, 1944 (age 82) New York City, New York, U.S.
- Listed height: 6 ft 3 in (1.91 m)
- Listed weight: 200 lb (91 kg)

Career information
- High school: Forest Hills (Queens, New York)
- College: Rhode Island (1962–1966)
- NBA draft: 1966: 3rd round, 23rd overall pick
- Drafted by: San Francisco Warriors
- Playing career: 1966–1973
- Position: Point guard / shooting guard
- Number: 14, 20, 34, 30, 22, 9, 44

Career history
- 1966–1967: Olimpia Milano
- 1967–1968: Anaheim Amigos / Los Angeles Stars
- 1968: Minnesota Pipers
- 1968–1969: Indiana Pacers
- 1969: New York Nets
- 1969: Pittsburgh Pipers
- 1969–1970: Indiana Pacers
- 1970: Kentucky Colonels
- 1970–1971: Hamden Bics
- 1971–1973: Maccabi Tel Aviv

Career highlights
- Italian League champion (1967); 2× Israeli League champion (1972, 1973); 2× Israeli Cup winner (1972, 1973); All-EBA Second Team (1971)
- Stats at Basketball Reference

Stephen Chubin, also known as "Chube" (born February 8, 1944) is an American former professional basketball player.

== College career ==
Born in New York City, Chubin played college basketball at the University of Rhode Island, with the Rhode Island Rams, where he became the school's all-time leading scorer. He was inducted into the University of Rhode Island Athletics Hall of Fame, in 1981.

He won a gold medal with Team USA in basketball at the 1965 Maccabiah Games in Israel, along with Tal Brody, Ronald Green, and Ron Watts.

He played on the United States basketball team that won a gold medal at the 1965 Maccabiah Games in Israel, along with Tal Brody, Ronald Green,

== Professional career ==
Chubin was selected by the San Francisco Warriors, in the 3rd round (23rd pick overall), of the 1966 NBA draft.

Chubin spent the 1966–67 season playing in the Italian League with Olimpia Milano, which placed second in the FIBA European Champions Cup (EuroLeague), behind Real Madrid. Chubin was the top scorer in the EuroLeague Finals, with 34 points.

Chubin played for the Anaheim Amigos (1967–68), and by most accounts, was the most popular player with the team's fans. Chubin averaged 18.2 points per game during his first ABA season. Also, during his first year with the Amigos, Chubin ranked second in the league in assists per game (4.7).

Chubin later played for the Los Angeles Stars, Minnesota Pipers, Indiana Pacers, and New York Nets (1968–69), the Pittsburgh Pipers, Pacers, and Kentucky Colonels (1969–70), in the American Basketball Association (ABA), in 226 games. He played for the Hamden Bics of the Eastern Basketball Association (EBA) during the 1970–71 season and was selected to the All-EBA Second Team. He also played in the Israeli League with Maccabi Tel Aviv.

== See also ==
- List of select Jewish basketball players
