= Les Selvage =

Personal information
- Born: March 7, 1943 St. Louis, Missouri, U.S.
- Died: June 15, 1991 (aged 48) St. Louis, Missouri, U.S.
- Listed height: 6 ft 1 in (1.85 m)
- Listed weight: 175 lb (79 kg)

Career information
- High school: Beaumont (St. Louis, Missouri)
- College: Truman (1962–1964)
- Position: Point guard
- Number: 12, 22

Career history
- 1967–1970: Anaheim Amigos / Los Angeles Stars

Career highlights
- First-team All-MIAA (1963)
- Stats at Basketball Reference

Lester Revell Selvage (March 7, 1943 – June 15, 1991) was an American professional basketball player.

A 6'1" guard from Beaumont High School in St. Louis, Missouri, Selvage played college basketball at Kirksville State Teachers College (now Truman State University). He was named to the All-MIAA First Team in 1963. After college, he moved to California to work with Douglas Aircraft, but continued to play Amateur Athletic Union basketball on the side. He was discovered and signed by the ABA's Anaheim Amigos in 1967, and appeared in 78 games for the team during the 1967–68 season, averaging 14 points per game. Selvage also was briefly a member of the 1969-1970 Los Angeles Stars team.

Selvage was known for his eagerness to shoot three-pointers, and led the ABA in three-point field goals made (147) and attempted (461) during the 1967–68 season. Selvage himself attempted more threes that season than any other ABA team except the Pittsburgh Pipers, and once shot 26 three-point attempts in a single game, making 10. Former Denver Rockets coach Bob Bass recalled, "He acted like if he stepped over [the three-point line], he was going to get killed or something. He didn't just shoot 25-footers — he took 30-footers. [...] All he could do was shoot, and he shot too much. But when he was hot, he was unlike anything I had ever seen."

Selvage died in 1991 after a brief illness.
