= 1967–68 ABA season =

- League: American Basketball Association
- Sport: Basketball
- Duration: October 13, 1967 – May 4, 1968
- Games: 78
- Teams: 11

Regular season
- Top seed: Pittsburgh Pipers
- Season MVP: Connie Hawkins (Pittsburgh)
- Top scorer: Doug Moe (New Orleans)

Playoffs
- Eastern champions: Pittsburgh Pipers
- Eastern runners-up: Minnesota Muskies
- Western champions: New Orleans Buccaneers
- Western runners-up: Dallas Chaparrals

Finals
- Champions: Pittsburgh Pipers
- Runners-up: New Orleans Buccaneers

ABA seasons
- 1968–69 →

The 1967–68 ABA season was the first season for the American Basketball Association. The ABA was challenging the National Basketball Association. The ABA introduced a red, white and blue basketball. They used a 30-second shot clock as opposed to the NBA's 24 second shot clock, and also used the three-point shot. There were 11 teams playing in the first season of the league, with each team playing a 78-game schedule.

== History ==
The American Basketball Association (ABA) was founded in 1967 by Dennis Murphy, former mayor of Buena Park, California, and Gary Davidson, an attorney from Orange County, California. George Mikan, a former National Basketball Association star best known for his career with the Minneapolis Lakers, was named as the league's first commissioner, saying that the ABA would avoid raiding the players from the NBA as the upstart league as it wanted to avoid legal issues relating to the reserve clause and hoped to avoid creating a bidding war for talent that would make player salaries unaffordable. Despite that, The New York Times reported that tentative offers had been made to Oscar Robertson and Wilt Chamberlain, who was offered a contract that would pay him $50,000 (half of what he was making with the Philadelphia 76ers) along with a 20% share of the team that started play as the New Jersey Americans.

By April 1967, the league announced that they would begin play for the 1967–68 season with 11 teams in two divisions. The Eastern Division would include teams representing Indianapolis, Indiana, Louisville, Kentucky, New York City (though that team later played primarily in the state of New Jersey instead at Teaneck this season due to a lack of suitable locations for the New York City team), Minneapolis and Pittsburgh, while the Western division would be made up of Anaheim, California, Dallas, Denver (previously Kansas City as the original, intended location for the team), Houston, New Orleans and Oakland. (Supposedly, according to sports historian author Robert Bradley in The Compendium of Professional Basketball, there was initially going to be a twelfth team added out in Milwaukee in the Eastern Division by the start of the 1967–68 ABA season, but that ultimately never came to fruition (likely due to the NBA later choosing it alongside Phoenix, Arizona as their newest locations at hand for their league expansion in 1968).) Each team owner made a commitment that they would have the resources to run for at least three years on annual budgets of $500,000 and would be able to absorb any financial losses during that period.

With the first pick in the league's inaugural draft in April 1967, Indianapolis chose Jimmy Walker, who had been a collegiate All-American at Providence College, where his 30.4 points per game led all major college players. Walker was also the first pick in the 1967 NBA draft by the Detroit Pistons and ended up playing his entire career in the NBA. Among its picks, New Orleans selected pole vaulter Bob Seagren "because he is a great athlete and we think he can play pro basketball", despite the fact that he had never played basketball at the college level. The 11 teams selected a total of 130 players.

In June 1967, NBA leading scorer Rick Barry left the San Francisco Warriors to sign with Oakland, making him the seventh player and the first superstar to defect to the upstart league. The landmark three-year contract offer from singer and team owner Pat Boone was estimated to be worth $500,000 and would make him one of basketball's highest-paid players. The agreement included 15 percent ownership in the franchise, which led Barry to remark, "The offer Oakland made me was one I simply couldn't turn down." In August, however, a superior court judge upheld the reserve clause in Barry's contract and ruled that he was obligated to play for the Warriors or sit out for the entire season. Barry ultimately chose to sit out for the year, rather than play for San Francisco.

Mikan unveiled the league's distinctive red, white and blue official ball in August, calling it "a patriotic ball" and saying that it would be more appealing visually on television.

Coaching changes
In-season
Team	Outgoing coach	Incoming coach
Anaheim Amigos	Al Brightman	Harry Dinnel
Kentucky Colonels	John Givens	Gene Rhodes

== Teams ==
1967–68 American Basketball Association
Division	Team	City	Arena	Capacity
Eastern	Indiana Pacers	Indianapolis, Indiana	Indiana State Fair Coliseum	10,000
Eastern	Kentucky Colonels	Louisville, Kentucky	Louisville Convention Center	6,000
Eastern	Minnesota Muskies	Bloomington, Minnesota	Metropolitan Sports Center	15,000
Eastern	New Jersey Americans	Teaneck, New Jersey	Teaneck Armory	5,500
Eastern	Pittsburgh Pipers	Pittsburgh, Pennsylvania	Civic Arena	12,508
Western	Anaheim Amigos	Anaheim, California	Anaheim Convention Center	9,100
Western	Dallas Chaparrals	University Park, Texas; Dallas, Texas	Moody Coliseum; Dallas Memorial Auditorium	8,998; 9,815
Western	Denver Rockets	Denver, Colorado	Denver Auditorium Arena	6,841
Western	Houston Mavericks	Houston, Texas	Sam Houston Coliseum	9,200
Western	New Orleans Buccaneers	New Orleans, Louisiana	Loyola Field House	6,500
Western	Oakland Oaks	Oakland, California	Oakland-Alameda County Coliseum Arena	13,502

=== Map of teams ===
Eastern Division Western Division

== Regular season ==
First ABA Game: Anaheim vs. Oakland	1	2	3	4	F
Anaheim Amigos	36	24	34	35	129
Oakland Oaks	33	37	27	37	134
Location: Oakland–Alameda County Coliseum Arena
Attendance: 4,828

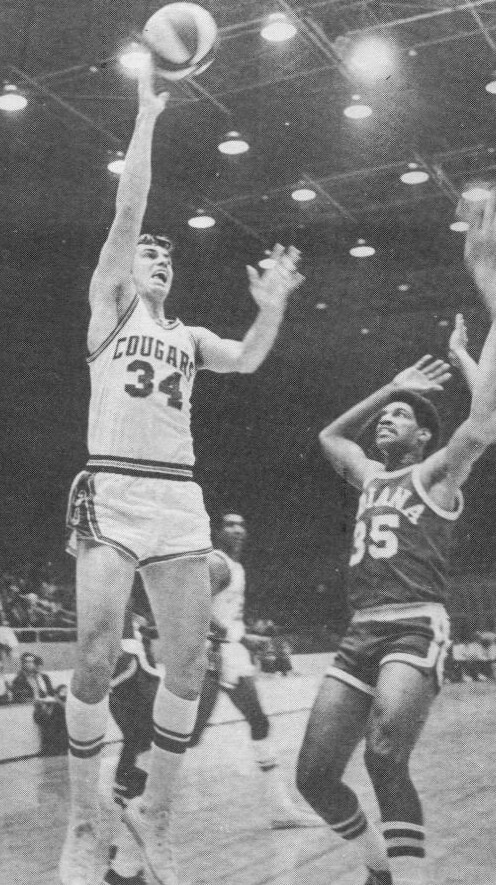
Doug Moe (left) of the New Orleans Buccaneers won the ABA scoring title.

The Oakland Oaks defeated the Anaheim Amigos by a score of 134–129 in the league's inaugural game in front of 4,828 fans at the Oakland Arena on October 13, 1967. Oakland's Andy Anderson was the high scorer with 33 points and Les Selvage hit four three-point field goals.

The league's first all-star game was played in Indianapolis on January 9, 1968, at Hinkle Fieldhouse. Coach Jim Pollard of the Minnesota Muskies led the East to a 126–120 win over the West team coached by Babe McCarthy of the New Orleans Buccaneers. Larry Brown of the Buccaneers was chosen as the game's Most Valuable Player. The nationally televised game was played in front of 10,872 fans, the largest attendance for any ABA game in Indianapolis as of that date.

At the end of the regular season, the New Jersey Americans and the Kentucky Colonels finished the season tied for the fourth and final playoff spot in the Eastern Division, with identical 36–42 records. The teams were supposed to play a one-game playoff to determine who would advance to the postseason, which was supposed to be played at the Teaneck Armory in Teaneck, New Jersey, home court of the Americans, but could not be played there as the circus was in town and had the space booked. The team tried to relocate the game to the Long Island Arena in Commack, New York, but when the teams arrived, the playing surface was in such poor condition that the Colonels refused to play. Mikan ruled that the Americans had failed to provide acceptable playing facilities and forfeited the game to the Colonels, with Kentucky advancing to the divisional semifinals.

On March 24, 1968, the ABA awarded their first Most Valuable Player Award to Connie Hawkins of the Pittsburgh Pipers; Hawkins led the league in scoring with 26.9 points per game (1,877 total), field goals made (634).

== Playoffs ==
The top seeds in each division during the regular season were the Eastern Division Pittsburgh Pipers and the New Orleans Buccaneers of the Western Division, and each won their respective division titles and won both divisional playoff rounds to advance to the league championship. In the seventh and deciding game, the Pipers defeated the Buccaneers by a score of 122–113 to take the first league championship, with Charlie Williams scoring a game high 35 points to lead the hometown Pipers in front of 11,475 fans.

== Final standings ==
=== Eastern Division ===
Team	W	L	PCT.	GB
**x-** **Pittsburgh Pipers**	54	24	.692	—
**x-**Minnesota Muskies	50	28	.641	4
**x-**Indiana Pacers	38	40	.487	16
**x-**Kentucky Colonels	36	42	.462	18
New Jersey Americans	36	42	.462	18

=== Western Division ===
Team	W	L	PCT.	GB
**x-**New Orleans Buccaneers	48	30	.615	—
**x-**Dallas Chaparrals	46	32	.590	2
**x-**Denver Rockets	45	33	.577	3
**x-**Houston Mavericks	29	49	.372	19
Anaheim Amigos	25	53	.321	23
Oakland Oaks	22	56	.282	26

x- denotes playoff team

Bold – ABA champions

== Awards and honors ==
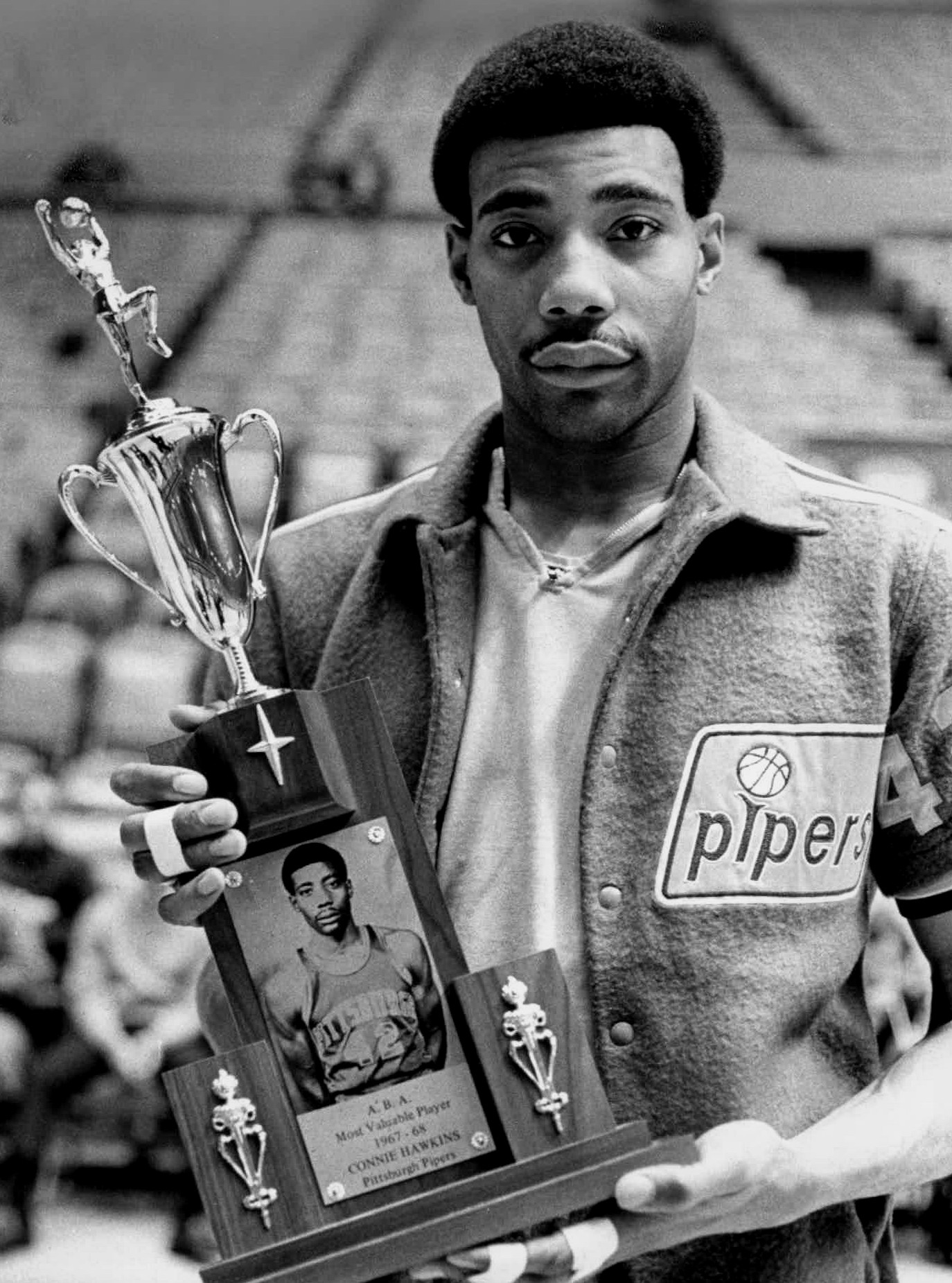
Connie Hawkins (Pittsburgh) holding the 1967–68 ABA Most Valuable Player Award.

- ABA Most Valuable Player Award: Connie Hawkins, Pittsburgh Pipers
- Rookie of the Year: Mel Daniels, Minnesota Muskies
- Coach of the Year: Vince Cazzetta, Pittsburgh Pipers
- Playoffs MVP: Connie Hawkins, Pittsburgh Pipers
- All-Star Game MVP: Larry Brown, New Orleans Buccaneers
- **All-ABA First Team**
  - Connie Hawkins, Pittsburgh Pipers
  - Doug Moe, New Orleans Buccaneers
  - Mel Daniels, Minnesota Muskies
  - Larry Jones, Denver Rockets
  - Charlie Williams, Pittsburgh Pipers
- **All-ABA Second Team**
  - Roger Brown, Indiana Pacers
  - Cincy Powell, Dallas Chaparrals
  - John Beasley, Dallas Chaparrals
  - Larry Brown, New Orleans Buccaneers
  - Louie Dampier, Kentucky Colonels
- **All-ABA Rookie Team**
  - Louie Dampier, Kentucky Colonels
  - Mel Daniels, Minnesota Muskies
  - Jimmy Jones, New Orleans Buccaneers
  - Bob Netolicky, Indiana Pacers
  - Trooper Washington, Pittsburgh Pipers
