= Anaheim Amigos =

ABA basketball team

Anaheim Amigos Los Angeles Stars Utah Stars
- Conference: None
- Division: Western Division
- Founded: 1967
- History: Anaheim Amigos; 1967–1968; Los Angeles Stars; 1968–1970; Utah Stars; 1970–1975
- Arena: Anaheim Convention Center; L.A. Memorial Sports Arena
- Location: Anaheim, California; Los Angeles, California
- Team colors: Black and orange (1967–68) Scarlet, white and powder blue (1968–70)
- Head coach: Al Brightman (1967); Harry Dinnel (1967–68)
- Ownership: Art Kim (1967–68); James Ackerman (1967–68); James J. Kirst (1968–70)

The Anaheim Amigos were a charter member American Basketball Association (ABA) team based in Southern California. They were the first professional sports team to identify with the city of Anaheim, California. After their first season in Anaheim, the team moved to Los Angeles to become the Los Angeles Stars. In 1970, it moved to Salt Lake City and became the Utah Stars.

The Amigos were the first professional team in any sport to bill themselves as representing the city of Anaheim, California, and were the only team to do so until the National Hockey League's Mighty Ducks of Anaheim began play in 1993. The California Angels of Major League Baseball played at Anaheim Stadium during the Amigos' existence, but they would not use "Anaheim" in their name until 1997.

== Franchise history ==
=== Origins ===
With the founding of the ABA on February 2, 1967, a charter franchise in Anaheim was awarded to Art Kim and James Ackerman for $30,000. Kim had been behind basketball ventures for the past two decades, which started with leagues for serviceman stationed in Hawaii. He then organized games with the Harlem Globetrotters that would see his teams lose starting in 1946. He was also behind the Hawaii / Long Beach Chiefs of the American Basketball League that had folded alongside the rest of the league in 1963. He was encouraged by Orange County and the support that they gave to the Angels at the time. On May 25, 1967, Kim announced that the team would be named the Amigos. The team played most of its home games at the Anaheim Convention Center. Five home games were scheduled elsewhere in California and three home games were scheduled in Honolulu, Hawaii. Al Brightman was the first head coach.

=== 1967–68 season ===
The Amigos played the first game in ABA history, facing the Oakland Oaks at Oakland Coliseum to start the inaugural 67-68 season, with close to 5,000 fans in attendance. They lost 132-129, by only one possession, despite surrendering 70 points to the Oaks in the first half.

The Amigos' roster was highlighted by guards Les Selvage, Jeff Congdon and Steve Chubin, former NBA player Ben Warley and 7 foot center Larry Bunce. Chubin led the team in scoring and assists and was a fan favorite. Selvage led the league in three-point field goal attempts. Warley led the team in rebounds and was an effective outside shooter. Congdon played well but was traded in mid-season to the Denver Rockets for Willis Thomas. Bunce did not live up to expectations despite his height, but played in the 1968 ABA All-Star Game, as did Warley.

The Amigos were not successful on the court, particularly on defense. They lost their first five games, including the first ever ABA game, a 134–129 loss to the Oakland Oaks on the road. After losing two thirds of their first 36 games Brightman was fired and replaced as head coach by Harry Dinnel. During the season the Amigos lost eight straight games in one stretch and had two other stretches of six losses each. The team finished the season with 25 wins and 53 losses, good for fifth place in Western Division but not good enough to make the playoffs. So dismal was the team that Dick Lee, a public-relations worker, was recruited to play to make for a full roster, where he even made appearances in two games.

=== Move to Los Angeles ===
The Amigos suffered from poor attendance. They averaged 1,293 fans per home game and their games were broadcast on radio and sometimes on television. High school games were outdrawing them and Kim admitted he was not particularly keen on spending money on the team despite doing promotional efforts to try to drum interest. However, they lost approximately $500,000 on the season and were sold for $450,000 to James J. Kirst who moved the team to nearby Los Angeles Memorial Sports Arena, where they became the Stars. Kirst also brought in Bill Sharman as the new head coach. Sharman had just completed two years coaching the NBA's San Francisco Warriors, taking them to the playoffs both years. With Sharman associated with the team, they were able to sign thirteen of their top fifteen draft picks including All-Americans Larry Miller and Merv Jackson. Playing with a roster that contained eight rookies, Los Angeles finished in 5th place and failed to make the playoffs in 1968–69. 1969-70 started out a little better for the Stars with some new veterans joining the best of the previous seasons returning players, but the team was still out of the playoff picture on March 5 when they were sold to cable television entrepreneur Bill Daniels. Following the sale the team came alive, making the playoffs on the last day of the season. Despite a fourth-place finish, Sharman, George Stone, and Mack Calvin led the Stars to the Western Conference Championship. In the 1970 ABA Finals, despite being heavy underdogs, they then stretched the Indiana Pacers to a sixth game before losing.

For a newspaper article in the Los Angeles Times in 1988, Kim was reported to have settled as being a teacher, doing so since 1973.

=== Move to Salt Lake City, Utah ===
After the 1969–70 season, the franchise once again relocated, this time to Salt Lake City, and became the Utah Stars.

== Season-by-season ==
Playoff berth

Season	League	Division	Finish	W	L	Win%	Playoffs	Awards
Anaheim Amigos
1967–68	ABA	Western	5th	25	53	.321	—	—
Los Angeles Stars
1968–69	ABA	Western	5th	33	45	.423	—	—
1969–70	ABA	Western	4th	43	41	.512	Won Division Semifinals (Chaparrals) 4–2; Won Division Finals (Rockets) 4–1; Lost ABA Finals (Pacers) 2–4	Bill Sharman (ABA COY)
