= Denver Nuggets all-time roster =

The following is a list of players, both past and current, who appeared at least in one game for the Denver Nuggets NBA franchise.

== Players ==
Note: Statistics are correct through the end of the 2025–26 season.

G	Guard	G/F	Guard-forward	F	Forward	F/C	Forward-center	C	Center

legend
^	Denotes player who has been inducted to the Naismith Memorial Basketball Hall of Fame
*	Denotes player who has been selected for at least one All-Star Game with the Denver Nuggets and is currently on the team roster
^{+}	Denotes player who has been selected for at least one All-Star Game with the Denver Nuggets
^{x}	Denotes player who is currently on the Denver Nuggets roster
0.0	Denotes the Denver Nuggets statistics leader (min. 100 games played for the team for per-game statistics)
player	Denotes player who has played for the Denver Nuggets in the ABA

=== A ===
All-time roster
Player	Pos.	Pre-draft team	Yrs	Seasons	Statistics									Ref.
Player	Pos.	Pre-draft team	Yrs	Seasons	GP	MP	REB	AST	PTS	MPG	RPG	APG	PPG	Ref.
Mahmoud Abdul-Rauf	G	LSU	6	1990–1996	439	12,481	903	1,756	7,029	28.4	2.1	4.0	16.0	
Tariq Abdul-Wahad	F	San Jose State	3	1999–2002	64	1,210	189	70	380	18.9	3.0	1.1	5.9	
Michael Adams	G	Boston College	4	1987–1991	304	10,601	987	2,181	5,534	34.9	3.2	7.2	18.2	
Arron Afflalo	G/F	UCLA	4	2009–2012; 2014–2015	266	8,381	880	556	3,305	31.5	3.3	2.1	12.4	
DeVaughn Akoon-Purcell	G	Illinois State	1	2018–2019	7	22	4	6	7	3.1	0.6	0.9	1.0	
Mark Alarie	F	Duke	1	1986–1987	64	1,110	214	74	503	17.3	3.3	1.2	7.9	
Cory Alexander	G	Virginia	3	1997–2000	88	1,904	215	315	666	21.6	2.4	3.6	7.6	
Trey Alexander	G	Creighton	1	2024–2025	24	117	12	11	32	4.9	0.5	0.5	1.3	
Jerome Allen	G	Penn	1	1996–1997	25	251	33	43	64	10.0	1.3	1.7	2.6	
Malik Allen	F/C	Villanova	1	2009–2010	51	456	82	16	105	8.9	1.6	0.3	2.1	
Chris Andersen	F/C	Blinn	7	2001–2004; 2008–2012	378	6,571	1,940	164	1,938	17.4	5.1	0.4	5.1	
Cadillac Anderson	F/C	Houston	2	1990–1992	123	3,452	1,178	90	1,159	28.1	9.6	0.7	9.4	
Cliff Anderson	G/F	Saint Joseph's	1	1969–1970	3	22	4	4	6	7.3	1.3	1.3	2.0	
Dwight Anderson	G	USC	1	1982–1983	5	33	2	3	21	6.6	0.4	0.6	4.2	
Richard Anderson	F/C	UC Santa Barbara	1	1983–1984	78	1,380	406	193	663	17.7	5.2	2.5	8.5	
Carmelo Anthony^	F	Syracuse	8	2003–2011	564	20,521	3,566	1,729	13,970	36.4	6.3	3.1	24.8	
Carlos Arroyo	G	FIU	1	2001–2002	20	275	28	49	81	13.8	1.4	2.5	4.1	
Darrell Arthur	F	Kansas	5	2013–2018	256	4,445	801	265	1,626	17.4	3.1	1.0	6.4	
Vincent Askew	G/F	Memphis	1	1996–1997	1	9	0	0	6	9.0	0.0	0.0	6.0	
Chucky Atkins	G	South Florida	2	2007–2009	38	467	37	75	140	12.3	1.0	2.0	3.7	
D. J. Augustin	G	Texas	1	2015–2016	28	659	52	132	325	23.5	1.9	4.7	11.6	

=== B ===
All-time roster
Player	Pos.	Pre-draft team	Yrs	Seasons	Statistics									Ref.
Player	Pos.	Pre-draft team	Yrs	Seasons	GP	MP	REB	AST	PTS	MPG	RPG	APG	PPG	Ref.
Renaldo Balkman	F	South Carolina	3	2008–2011	71	915	230	43	291	12.9	3.2	0.6	4.1	
John Barnhill	G	Tennessee State	1	1970–1971	24	684	54	77	274	28.5	2.3	3.2	11.4	
Jon Barry	G	Georgia Tech	1	2003–2004	57	1,101	123	147	351	19.3	2.2	2.6	6.2	
Will Barton	G	Memphis	8	2014–2022	479	14,542	2,402	1,587	6,695	30.4	5.0	3.3	14.0	
Mengke Bateer	C	(China) Beijing Ducks	1	2001–2002	27	408	96	22	139	15.1	3.6	0.8	5.1	
Keita Bates-Diop	F	Ohio State	1	2019–2020	7	98	17	0	37	14.0	2.4	.0	5.3	
Tony Battie	F/C	Texas Tech	1	1997–1998	65	1,506	351	60	544	23.2	5.4	0.9	8.4	
Kenny Battle	F	Illinois	1	1990–1991	40	682	123	47	243	17.1	3.1	1.2	6.1	
Malik Beasley	G	Florida State	4	2016–2020	206	3,373	365	187	1,521	16.4	1.8	0.9	7.4	
Byron Beck (#40)	F/C	Denver	10	1967–1977	747	19,197	5,261	978	8,603	25.7	7.0	1.3	11.5	
Arthur Becker	F	Arizona State	2	1970–1972	113	2,996	680	144	1,475	26.5	6.0	1.3	13.1	
Elmer Bennett	G	Notre Dame	1	1996–1997	5	59	3	7	12	11.8	0.6	1.4	2.4	
Chauncey Billups^	G	Colorado	5	1998–2000; 2008–2011	259	8,648	712	1,383	4,378	33.4	2.7	5.3	16.9	
Steve Blake	G	Maryland	1	2006–2007	49	1,642	124	324	408	33.5	2.5	6.6	8.3	
Mark Blount	C	Pittsburgh	1	2002–2003	54	885	183	35	281	16.4	3.4	0.6	5.2	
Bol Bol	F/C	Oregon	3	2019–2022	53	328	63	18	142	6.2	1.2	0.3	2.7	
Melvin Booker	G	Missouri	1	1996–1997	5	21	1	3	5	4.2	0.2	0.6	1.0	
Tom Boswell	F/C	South Carolina	2	1978–1980	97	2,723	652	288	1,043	28.1	6.7	3.0	10.8	
Ryan Bowen	F	Iowa	5	1999–2004	298	4,359	770	174	955	14.6	2.6	0.6	3.2	
Tom Bowens	F/C	Grambling State	1	1967–1968	67	1,287	374	41	410	19.2	5.6	0.6	6.1	
Earl Boykins	G	Eastern Michigan	4	2003–2007	255	6,430	430	1,029	3,082	25.2	1.7	4.0	12.1	
Jim Bradley	F	Northern Illinois	1	1975–1976	7	107	30	11	32	15.3	4.3	1.6	4.6	
Christian Braun^{x}	G	Kansas	4	2022–2026	281	6,910	1,108	516	2,704	24.6	3.9	1.8	9.6	
Corey Brewer	G/F	Florida	2	2011–2013	141	3,290	385	212	1,515	23.3	2.7	1.5	10.7	
Aaron Brooks	G	Oregon	1	2013–2014	29	841	78	150	346	29.0	2.7	5.2	11.9	
Kevin Brooks	F	Louisiana	3	1991–1994	126	1,031	141	48	417	8.2	1.1	0.4	3.3	
Michael Brooks	F	La Salle	1	1987–1988	16	133	44	13	43	8.3	2.8	0.8	2.7	
Bruce Brown^{x}	G/F	Miami (FL)	2	2022–2023; 2025–2026	162	4,278	646	442	1,572	26.4	4.0	2.7	9.7	
Devin Brown	G	UTSA	1	2002–2003	3	71	11	5	18	23.7	3.7	1.7	6.0	
Larry Brown^	G	North Carolina	2	1970–1972	110	2,825	228	757	976	25.7	2.1	6.9	8.9	
Roger Brown	C	Kansas	1	1975–1976	37	291	75	22	74	7.9	2.0	0.6	2.0	
Mark Bryant	F/C	Seton Hall	1	2002–2003	3	14	2	2	1	4.7	0.7	0.7	0.3	
Thomas Bryant	F/C	Indiana	1	2022–2023	18	205	60	2	83	11.4	3.3	0.1	4.6	
Greg Buckner	G	Clemson	2	2004–2006	143	3,280	417	260	923	22.9	2.9	1.8	6.5	
Larry Bunce	C	Utah State	1	1968–1969	23	225	58	2	93	9.8	2.5	0.1	4.0	
David Burns	G	Saint Louis	1	1981–1982	6	53	3	11	16	8.8	0.5	1.8	2.7	
Dave Bustion	F	Denver	1	1972–1973	47	355	101	21	158	7.6	2.1	0.4	3.4	

=== C ===
All-time roster
Player	Pos.	Pre-draft team	Yrs	Seasons	Statistics									Ref.
Player	Pos.	Pre-draft team	Yrs	Seasons	GP	MP	REB	AST	PTS	MPG	RPG	APG	PPG	Ref.
Kentavious Caldwell-Pope	G	Georgia	2	2022–2024	152	4,783	391	366	1,588	31.5	2.6	2.4	10.4	
Mack Calvin	G	USC	3	1974–1975; 1976–1978	180	4,076	343	833	2,234	22.6	1.9	4.6	12.4	
Marcus Camby	F/C	UMass	6	2002–2008	372	11,777	4,117	928	3,748	31.7	11.1	2.5	10.1	
Facundo Campazzo	G	(Argentina) Peñarol	2	2020–2022	130	2,609	251	452	396	20.1	1.9	3.5	5.6	
Vlatko Čančar	F	(Serbia) Mega Leks	5	2019–2023; 2024–2025	143	1,527	251	123	485	10.7	1.8	0.9	3.4	
Larry Cannon	G	La Salle	1	1970–1971	80	3,097	333	414	2,126	38.7	4.2	5.2	26.6	
Frank Card	F	South Carolina State	2	1971–1973	77	1,479	337	79	583	19.2	4.4	1.0	7.6	
DeMarre Carroll	F	Missouri	1	2011–2012	4	21	3	3	12	5.3	0.8	0.8	3.0	
Joe Barry Carroll	F/C	Purdue	1	1989–1990	30	719	193	54	358	24.0	6.4	1.8	11.9	
Anthony Carter	G	Hawaii	5	2006–2011	218	4,796	509	949	1,169	22.0	2.3	4.4	5.4	
Howard Carter	G	LSU	1	1983–1984	55	688	86	71	342	12.5	1.6	1.3	6.2	
Wilson Chandler	F	DePaul	7	2010–2015; 2016–2018	357	10,877	1,991	657	4,683	30.5	5.6	1.8	13.1	
Wayne Chapman	G/F	Western Kentucky	1	1970–1971	47	1,049	143	107	468	22.3	3.0	2.3	10.0	
Calbert Cheaney	G/F	Indiana	2	2000–2002	77	1,784	260	119	515	23.2	3.4	1.5	6.7	
Gary Clark	F	Cincinnati	1	2020–2021	2	4	1	0	0	2.0	0.5	0.0	0.0	
Ian Clark	G	Belmont	1	2014–2015	7	31	3	2	13	4.4	0.4	0.3	1.9	
Keon Clark	F/C	UNLV	3	1998–2001	144	3,011	787	115	1,014	20.9	5.5	0.8	7.0	
Jeff Congdon	G	BYU	3	1967–1970	183	3,838	360	640	1,259	21.0	2.0	3.5	6.9	
Anthony Cook	F/C	Arizona	2	1990–1992	80	1,236	360	28	341	15.5	4.5	0.4	4.3	
Darwin Cook	G	Portland	1	1988–1989	30	386	48	43	161	12.9	1.6	1.4	5.4	
Norm Cook	F	Kansas	1	1977–1978	2	10	3	1	2	5.0	1.5	0.5	1.0	
Tyler Cook	F	Iowa	1	2019–2020	2	19	4	0	4	9.5	2.0	0.0	2.0	
Wayne Cooper	F/C	New Orleans	5	1984–1989	351	8,433	2,603	343	3,345	24.0	7.4	1.0	9.5	
Petr Cornelie	F/C	(France) Le Mans Sarthe	1	2021–2022	13	38	14	3	14	2.9	1.1	0.2	1.1	
DeMarcus Cousins	C	Kentucky	1	2021–2022	31	431	172	53	276	13.9	5.5	1.7	8.9	
Torrey Craig	G/F	USC Upstate	3	2017–2020	172	3,204	579	144	908	18.6	3.4	0.8	5.3	
Geoff Crompton	C	North Carolina	1	1978–1979	20	88	23	5	26	4.4	1.2	0.3	1.3	
John Crotty	G	Virginia	1	2002–2003	12	180	15	29	41	15.0	1.3	2.4	3.4	
Rastko Cvetković	C	(Federal Republic of Yugoslavia) Crvena zvezda	1	1995–1996	14	48	11	3	10	3.4	0.8	0.2	0.7	

=== D to E ===
All-time roster
Player	Pos.	Pre-draft team	Yrs	Seasons	Statistics									Ref.
Player	Pos.	Pre-draft team	Yrs	Seasons	GP	MP	REB	AST	PTS	MPG	RPG	APG	PPG	Ref.
Troy Daniels	G	VCU	1	2019–2020	6	76	6	3	26	12.7	1.0	.5	4.3	
Terry Davis	F/C	Virginia Union	1	2000–2001	19	228	53	7	33	12.0	2.8	0.4	1.7	
Walter Davis^	G/F	North Carolina	4	1988–1992	235	5,277	523	497	3,659	22.5	2.2	2.1	15.6	
Kenny Dennard	F	Duke	1	1983–1984	43	413	101	45	90	9.6	2.3	1.0	2.1	
Yakhouba Diawara	G/F	Pepperdine	2	2006–2008	118	1,719	172	92	437	14.6	1.5	0.8	3.7	
Michael Doleac	C	Utah	1	2003–2004	26	344	76	14	94	13.2	2.9	0.5	3.6	
Jacky Dorsey	F	Georgia	1	1977–1978	7	37	20	2	9	5.3	2.9	0.3	1.3	
PJ Dozier	G/F	South Carolina	2	2019–2021	97	1,840	300	184	650	19.0	3.1	1.9	6.7	
T. R. Dunn	G/F	Alabama	10	1980–1988; 1989–1991	734	18,322	3,496	1,311	3,585	25.0	4.8	1.8	4.9	
Keith Edmonson	G	Purdue	1	1983–1984	15	101	18	7	64	6.7	1.2	0.5	4.3	
Howard Eisley	G	Boston College	1	2005–2006	19	282	19	44	92	14.8	1.0	2.3	4.8	
Bo Ellis	F	Marquette	3	1977–1980	168	1,984	482	113	613	11.8	2.9	0.7	3.6	
Dale Ellis	G/F	Tennessee	3	1994–1997	244	7,562	830	361	3,483	31.0	3.4	1.5	14.3	
Harold Ellis	G	Morehouse	1	1997–1998	27	344	50	18	164	12.7	1.9	0.7	6.1	
LaPhonso Ellis	F	Notre Dame	6	1992–1998	343	11,352	2,695	740	5,201	33.1	7.9	2.2	15.2	
Francisco Elson	C	California	3	2003–2006	201	3,393	743	113	818	16.9	3.7	0.6	4.1	
Melvin Ely	C	Fresno State	1	2010–2011	30	366	74	14	69	12.2	2.5	0.5	2.3	
Wayne Engelstad	F	UC Irvine	1	1988–1989	11	50	16	7	28	4.5	1.5	0.6	2.5	
Alex English^ (#2)	F	South Carolina	11	1979–1990	837	29,893	4,686	3,679	21,645	35.7	5.6	4.4	25.9	
James Ennis III	F	Long Beach State	1	2021–2022	3	14	2	3	4	4.7	0.7	1.0	1.3	
Mike Evans	G	Kansas State	6	1982–1988	419	7,431	592	1,075	3,642	17.7	1.4	2.6	8.7	
Reggie Evans	F	Iowa	2	2005–2007	92	1,732	686	60	460	18.8	7.5	0.7	5.0	

=== F to G ===
All-time roster
Player	Pos.	Pre-draft team	Yrs	Seasons	Statistics									Ref.
Player	Pos.	Pre-draft team	Yrs	Seasons	GP	MP	REB	AST	PTS	MPG	RPG	APG	PPG	Ref.
John Fairchild	F	BYU	1	1968–1969	11	135	18	9	40	12.3	1.6	0.8	3.6	
Kenneth Faried	F	Morehead State	7	2011–2018	441	11,000	3,634	450	5,046	24.9	8.2	1.0	11.4	
Jim Farmer	G	Alabama	2	1990–1991; 1993–1994	29	472	65	42	253	16.3	2.2	1.4	8.7	
Raymond Felton	G	North Carolina	1	2010–2011	21	663	75	137	241	31.6	3.6	6.5	11.5	
Rudy Fernández	G	(Spain) Joventut	1	2011–2012	31	710	65	75	268	22.9	2.1	2.4	8.6	
Matt Fish	C	UNC Wilmington	1	1995–1996	16	117	18	7	40	7.3	1.1	0.4	2.5	
Luis Flores	G	Manhattan	1	2004–2005	1	4	1	0	3	4.0	1.0	0.0	3.0	
Bryn Forbes	G	Michigan State	1	2021–2022	35	610	30	34	300	17.4	0.9	1.0	8.0	
Gary Forbes	F	UMass	1	2010–2011	63	791	116	49	326	12.6	1.8	0.8	5.2	
Danny Fortson	F	Cincinnati	2	1997–1999	130	3,228	1,029	108	1,366	24.8	7.9	0.8	10.5	
Jimmy Foster	G	UConn	1	1975–1976	48	352	42	47	148	7.3	0.9	1.0	3.1	
Evan Fournier	G/F	(France) Poitiers Basket 86	2	2012–2014	114	1,931	237	156	840	16.9	2.1	1.4	7.4	
Randy Foye	G	Villanova	3	2013–2016	185	4,642	422	518	1,826	25.1	2.3	2.8	9.9	
Jamaal Franklin	G	San Diego State	1	2014–2015	3	13	2	3	3	4.3	0.7	1.0	1.0	
Corey Gaines	G	Loyola Marymount	1	1990–1991	10	226	14	91	83	22.6	1.4	9.1	8.3	
Danilo Gallinari	F	(Italy) Olimpia Milano	6	2010–2013; 2014–2017	303	9,492	1,469	667	4,898	31.3	4.8	2.2	16.2	
Chuck Gardner	F	Colorado	1	1967–1968	42	487	136	13	197	11.6	3.2	0.3	4.7	
Gary Garland	G	DePaul	1	1979–1980	78	1,106	138	145	334	14.2	1.8	1.9	4.3	
Winston Garland	G	Missouri State	1	1991–1992	78	2,209	190	411	846	28.3	2.4	5.3	10.8	
Dean Garrett	C	Indiana	1	1997–1998	82	2,632	644	90	598	32.1	7.9	1.1	7.3	
Kiwane Garris	G	Illinois	1	1997–1998	28	225	19	28	68	8.0	0.7	1.0	2.4	
Chris Gatling	F/C	Old Dominion	1	1999–2000	40	770	205	31	416	19.3	5.1	0.8	10.4	
Alonzo Gee	G	Alabama	2	2014–2015; 2016–2017	52	600	85	25	201	11.5	1.6	0.5	3.9	
Gus Gerard	G/F	Virginia	2	1975–1977	84	1,641	401	171	834	19.5	4.8	2.0	9.9	
Collin Gillespie	G	Villanova	1	2023–2024	24	225	21	27	87	9.4	0.9	1.1	3.6	
Anthony Goldwire	G	Houston	3	1996–1998; 2000–2001	129	3,025	205	436	1,030	23.4	1.6	3.4	8.0	
Glen Gondrezick	G/F	UNLV	4	1979–1983	288	4,926	1,290	416	1,822	17.1	4.5	1.4	6.3	
Brandon Goodwin	G	Florida Gulf Coast	1	2018–2019	16	57	3	14	23	3.6	0.2	0.9	1.4	
Aaron Gordon^{x}	F	Arizona	6	2020–2026	328	9,828	1,930	966	4,832	30.9	5.9	2.9	14.7	
Joey Graham	F	Oklahoma State	1	2009–2010	63	759	123	22	266	12.0	2.0	0.3	4.2	
Greg Grant	G	TCNJ	2	1994–1996	24	260	16	57	45	10.8	0.7	2.4	1.9	
Jerami Grant	F	Syracuse	1	2019–2020	71	1,892	248	88	851	26.6	3.5	1.2	12.0	
Erick Green	G	Virginia Tech	2	2014–2016	46	417	32	40	146	9.1	0.7	0.9	3.2	
JaMychal Green	F/C	Alabama	2	2020–2022	125	2,205	558	112	903	17.6	4.5	0.9	7.2	
Jeff Green	F	Georgetown	2	2021–2023	131	2,940	375	165	1,209	22.4	2.9	1.3	9.2	
Mike Green	F/C	Louisiana Tech	2	1973–1975	160	4,205	1,333	165	2,315	26.3	8.3	1.0	14.5	
Taurean Green	G	Florida	1	2007–2008	9	30	6	3	10	3.3	0.7	0.3	1.1	
David Greenwood	F/C	UCLA	1	1988–1989	29	491	164	41	172	16.9	5.7	1.4	5.9	

=== H ===
All-time roster
Player	Pos.	Pre-draft team	Yrs	Seasons	Statistics									Ref.
Player	Pos.	Pre-draft team	Yrs	Seasons	GP	MP	REB	AST	PTS	MPG	RPG	APG	PPG	Ref.
PJ Hall	C	Clemson	1	2024–2025	19	66	22	4	33	3.5	1.2	0.2	1.7	
Darvin Ham	F	Texas Tech	1	1996–1997	35	313	56	14	80	8.9	1.6	0.4	2.3	
Jordan Hamilton	G/F	Texas	3	2011–2014	105	1,325	290	77	589	12.6	2.8	0.7	5.6	
Zendon Hamilton	F/C	St. John's	1	2001–2002	54	848	253	14	324	15.7	4.7	0.3	6.0	
Julian Hammond	F	Tulsa	5	1967–1972	329	8,039	2,036	421	3,547	24.4	6.2	1.3	10.8	
Tom Hammonds	F	Georgia Tech	5	1992–1997	331	5,207	1,141	173	1,764	15.7	3.4	0.5	5.3	
R. J. Hampton	G	New Zealand Breakers	1	2020–2021	25	233	50	14	64	9.3	2.0	0.6	2.6	
Bill Hanzlik	G/F	Notre Dame	8	1982–1990	593	12,301	1,639	1,764	4,546	20.7	2.8	3.0	7.7	
Tim Hardaway^	G	UTEP	1	2001–2002	14	325	27	77	134	23.2	1.9	5.5	9.6	
Tim Hardaway Jr.^{x}	G	Michigan	1	2025–2026	80	2,127	206	108	1,079	26.6	2.6	1.4	13.5	
Adam Harrington	G	Auburn	1	2002–2003	6	74	6	10	19	12.3	1.0	1.7	3.2	
Al Harrington	F	St. Patrick HS (NJ)	2	2010–2012	137	3,426	722	189	1,675	25.0	5.3	1.4	12.2	
Lorinza Harrington	G	Wingate	1	2002–2003	82	2,003	250	277	418	24.4	3.0	3.4	5.1	
Devin Harris	G	Wisconsin	1	2017–2018	27	533	42	67	222	19.7	1.6	2.5	8.2	
Gary Harris	G	Michigan State	7	2014–2021	387	11,244	1,008	811	4,643	29.1	2.6	2.1	12.0	
Shaquille Harrison	G	Tulsa	1	2020–2021	17	277	39	16	56	16.3	2.3	0.9	3.3	
Jason Hart	G	Syracuse	1	2008–2009	11	36	4	5	13	3.3	0.4	0.5	1.2	
Isaiah Hartenstein	C	(Lithuania) Žalgiris Kaunas	1	2020–2021	30	272	85	15	104	9.1	2.8	0.5	3.5	
Donnell Harvey	F	Florida	2	2001–2003	106	2,292	590	132	843	21.6	5.6	1.2	8.0	
Scott Hastings	F/C	Arkansas	2	1991–1993	116	1,091	235	60	214	9.4	2.0	0.5	1.8	
Spencer Haywood^	F/C	Detroit Mercy	1	1969–1970	84	3,808	1,637	190	2,519	45.3	19.5	2.3	30.0	
Juancho Hernangómez	F	(Spain) Estudiantes	4	2016–2020	191	2,899	601	118	902	15.2	3.1	0.6	4.7	
Chris Herren	G	Fresno State	1	1999–2000	45	597	52	111	141	13.3	1.2	2.5	3.1	
Carl Herrera	F	Houston	1	1998–1999	24	265	54	1	59	11.0	2.3	0.0	2.5	
Dan Hester	F	LSU	1	1970–1971	35	462	198	30	205	13.2	5.7	0.9	5.9	
Roy Hibbert	C	Georgetown	1	2016–2017	6	11	2	1	4	1.8	0.3	0.2	0.7	
Phil Hicks	F	Tulane	1	1978–1979	20	128	28	8	39	6.4	1.4	0.4	2.0	
JJ Hickson	F/C	NC State	3	2013–2016	162	3,575	1,171	169	1,503	22.1	7.2	1.0	9.3	
Mike Higgins	F	Northern Colorado	1	1989–1990	5	32	3	2	13	6.4	0.6	0.4	2.6	
Kenny Higgs	G	LSU	2	1980–1982	148	3,385	289	803	1,131	22.9	2.0	5.4	7.6	
Wayne Hightower	F/C	Kansas	2	1967–1969	141	4,777	1,177	346	2,215	33.9	8.3	2.5	15.7	
Darnell Hillman	F/C	San Jose State	1	1977–1978	33	746	239	53	257	22.6	7.2	1.6	7.8	
Julius Hodge	G	NC State	2	2005–2007	18	70	10	16	19	3.9	0.6	0.9	1.1	
Justin Holiday	G/F	Washington	1	2023–2024	58	862	71	67	234	14.9	1.2	1.2	4.0	
DaRon Holmes II^{x}	F	Dayton	1	2025–2026	25	210	35	16	93	8.4	1.4	0.6	3.7	
Tom Hoover	C	Villanova	1	1967–1968	70	1,588	491	64	454	22.7	7.0	0.9	6.5	
Cedrick Hordges	F/C	South Carolina	2	1980–1982	145	2,971	853	169	1,099	20.5	5.9	1.2	7.6	
Ron Horn	F	Indiana	1	1967–1968	1	6	1	0	2	6.0	1.0	0.0	2.0	
Juwan Howard	F	Michigan	3	2001–2003; 2008–2009	108	3,728	811	312	1,921	34.5	7.5	2.9	17.8	
Markus Howard	G	Marquette	2	2020–2022	68	381	33	25	231	5.6	0.5	0.4	3.4	
Jay Huff	C	Virginia	1	2023–2024	20	49	11	2	23	2.5	0.6	0.1	1.2	
Eddie Hughes	G	Colorado State	2	1988–1990	86	1,116	89	151	279	13.0	1.0	1.8	3.2	
Kim Hughes	C	Wisconsin	3	1978–1981	159	2,453	711	159	456	15.4	4.5	1.0	2.9	
Steven Hunter	C	DePaul	1	2007–2008	19	120	29	0	39	6.3	1.5	0.0	2.1	
Bones Hyland	G	VCU	2	2021–2023	111	2,130	274	316	1,206	19.2	2.5	2.8	10.9	

=== I to J ===
All-time roster
Player	Pos.	Pre-draft team	Yrs	Seasons	Statistics									Ref.
Player	Pos.	Pre-draft team	Yrs	Seasons	GP	MP	REB	AST	PTS	MPG	RPG	APG	PPG	Ref.
Andre Iguodala	G/F	Arizona	1	2012–2013	80	2,779	423	433	1,038	34.7	5.3	5.4	13.0	
George Irvine	G/F	Washington	1	1975–1976	3	14	1	0	4	4.7	0.3	0.0	1.3	
Dan Issel^ (#44)	F/C	Kentucky	10	1975–1985	802	25,198	6,630	2,005	16,589	31.4	8.3	2.5	20.7	
Allen Iverson^	G	Georgetown	3	2006–2009	135	5,668	403	965	3,461	42.0	3.0	7.1	25.6	
Warren Jabali	G/F	Wichita State	2	1972–1974	131	4,449	670	897	2,177	34.0	5.1	6.8	16.6	
Bobby Jackson	G	Minnesota	1	1997–1998	68	2,042	302	317	790	30.0	4.4	4.7	11.6	
Mark Jackson	G	St. John's	1	1996–1997	52	2,001	271	641	541	38.5	5.2	12.3	10.4	
Reggie Jackson	G	Boston College	2	2022–2024	98	2,136	183	358	960	21.8	1.9	3.7	9.8	
Richard Jefferson	F	Arizona	1	2017–2018	20	163	17	15	30	8.2	0.9	0.8	1.5	
Avery Johnson	G	Southern	2	1990–1991; 2001–2002	72	1,417	85	335	560	19.7	1.2	4.7	7.8	
Cameron Johnson^{x}	F	North Carolina	1	2025–2026	54	1,647	206	132	660	30.5	3.8	2.4	12.2	
DerMarr Johnson	F	Cincinnati	3	2004–2007	168	2,575	304	147	992	15.3	1.8	0.9	5.9	
Ervin Johnson	C	New Orleans	1	1996–1997	82	2,599	913	71	582	31.7	11.1	0.9	7.1	
George Johnson	F/C	St. John's	1	1979–1980	75	1,938	584	157	768	25.8	7.8	2.1	10.2	
Nikola Jokić*	C	(Serbia) Mega Basket	11	2015–2026	810	25,914	8,977	6,080	18,009	32.0	11.1	7.5	22.2	
Bobby Jones^	F	North Carolina	4	1974–1978	324	10,410	2,797	1,150	4,806	32.1	8.6	3.5	14.8	
Bobby Jones	F	Washington	1	2007–2008	25	222	38	11	84	8.9	1.5	0.4	3.4	
Carlik Jones	G	Louisville	1	2021–2022	2	4	0	0	2	2.0	0.0	0.0	1.0	
Curtis Jones^{x}	G	Iowa State	1	2025–2026	10	88	11	10	29	8.8	1.1	1.0	2.9	
Dahntay Jones	G/F	Duke	1	2008–2009	79	1,426	168	78	429	18.1	2.1	1.0	5.4	
Larry Jones	G/F	Toledo	3	1967–1970	226	9,154	1,483	954	5,745	40.5	6.6	4.2	25.4	
Popeye Jones	F	Murray State	1	1999–2000	40	330	103	19	104	8.3	2.6	0.5	2.6	
Spencer Jones^{x}	F	Stanford	2	2024–2026	84	1,542	226	56	378	18.4	2.7	0.7	4.5	
Steve Jones	G/F	Oregon	1	1973–1974	42	1,157	139	128	575	27.5	3.3	3.0	13.7	
Tyus Jones^{x}	G	Iowa State	1	2025–2026	11	92	14	13	24	8.4	1.3	1.2	2.2	
Adonis Jordan	G	Kansas	1	1993–1994	6	79	6	19	15	13.2	1.0	3.2	2.5	
DeAndre Jordan	C	Texas A&M	3	2022–2025	131	1,673	643	113	550	12.8	4.9	0.9	4.2	
Garth Joseph	C	Saint Rose	1	2000–2001	2	8	0	0	0	4.0	0.0	0.0	0.0	

=== K to L ===
All-time roster
Player	Pos.	Pre-draft team	Yrs	Seasons	Statistics									Ref.
Player	Pos.	Pre-draft team	Yrs	Seasons	GP	MP	REB	AST	PTS	MPG	RPG	APG	PPG	Ref.
Rich Kelley	F/C	Stanford	1	1982–1983	38	565	172	59	173	14.9	4.5	1.6	4.6	
Tim Kempton	F/C	Notre Dame	1	1989–1990	71	1,061	218	118	383	14.9	3.1	1.7	5.4	
Braxton Key	F	Virginia	1	2023–2024	20	60	18	9	22	3.0	0.9	0.5	1.1	
Julius Keye	F/C	Alcorn State	5	1969–1974	406	13,443	4,547	655	3,131	33.1	11.2	1.6	7.7	
Sean Kilpatrick	G	Cincinnati	1	2015–2016	8	82	6	3	27	10.3	0.8	0.4	3.4	
Jimmy King	G	Michigan	1	1996–1997	2	22	2	2	6	11.0	1.0	1.0	3.0	
Linas Kleiza	F	Missouri	4	2005–2009	301	5,720	1,042	219	2,504	19.0	3.5	0.7	8.3	
Joe Kopicki	F	Detroit Mercy	1	1984–1985	42	308	86	29	145	7.3	2.0	0.7	3.5	
Kosta Koufos	C	Ohio State	3	2010–2013	140	2,707	853	47	965	19.3	6.1	0.3	6.9	
Arvid Kramer	C	Augustana University	1	1979–1980	8	45	12	3	16	5.6	1.5	0.4	2.0	
John Kuester	G	North Carolina	1	1978–1979	33	212	13	37	45	6.4	0.4	1.1	1.4	
Raef LaFrentz	F/C	Kansas	4	1998–2002	222	6,947	1,718	272	2,939	31.3	7.7	1.2	13.2	
Tom LaGarde	F/C	North Carolina	1	1977–1978	77	868	214	47	306	11.3	2.8	0.6	4.0	
Jerome Lane	F	Pittsburgh	4	1988–1992	192	3,030	1,183	301	1,086	15.8	6.2	1.6	5.7	
Priest Lauderdale	C	Central State	1	1997–1998	39	345	100	21	144	8.8	2.6	0.5	3.7	
Joffrey Lauvergne	F/C	(Serbia) Partizan	2	2014–2016	83	1,309	367	69	558	15.8	4.4	0.8	6.7	
Ty Lawson	G	North Carolina	6	2009–2015	416	12,945	1,207	2,745	5,923	31.1	2.9	6.6	14.2	
Tim Legler	G	La Salle	1	1990–1991	10	148	18	12	58	14.8	1.8	1.2	5.8	
Voshon Lenard	G	Minnesota	5	2000–2002; 2003–2006	239	6,521	648	495	2,951	27.3	2.7	2.1	12.3	
Fat Lever^{+} (#12)	G	Arizona State	6	1984–1990	474	16,867	3,621	3,566	8,081	35.6	7.6	7.5	17.0	
Cliff Levingston	F	Wichita State	1	1994–1995	57	469	124	27	129	8.2	2.2	0.5	2.3	
Marcus Liberty	F	Illinois	4	1990–1994	232	4,294	869	229	1,842	18.5	3.7	1.0	7.9	
Todd Lichti	G/F	Stanford	4	1989–1993	224	4,114	483	314	1,812	18.4	2.2	1.4	8.1	
Willie Long	F/C	New Mexico	2	1972–1974	138	3,108	756	143	1,540	22.5	5.5	1.0	11.2	
Tyler Lydon	F	Syracuse	2	2017–2019	26	96	18	6	23	3.7	0.7	0.2	0.9	
Trey Lyles	F	Kentucky	2	2017–2019	137	2,511	593	178	1,270	18.3	4.3	1.3	9.3	
R. B. Lynam	G	Oklahoma Baptist	1	1967–1968	7	39	5	0	17	5.6	0.7	0.0	2.4	
Lonnie Lynn	F	Wilberforce	1	1969–1970	12	140	50	4	48	11.7	4.2	0.3	4.0	

=== M ===
All-time roster
Player	Pos.	Pre-draft team	Yrs	Seasons	Statistics									Ref.
Player	Pos.	Pre-draft team	Yrs	Seasons	GP	MP	REB	AST	PTS	MPG	RPG	APG	PPG	Ref.
Don MacLean	F	UCLA	1	1995–1996	56	1,107	205	89	625	19.8	3.7	1.6	11.2	
Mark Macon	G	Temple	3	1991–1994	131	3,571	330	305	1,199	27.3	2.5	2.3	9.2	
Roy Marble	G/F	Iowa	1	1993–1994	5	32	8	1	4	6.4	1.6	0.2	0.8	
Šarūnas Marčiulionis^	G	(Soviet Union) Statyba	1	1996–1997	17	255	30	25	116	15.0	1.8	1.5	6.8	
Kenyon Martin	F	Cincinnati	7	2004–2011	371	11,370	2,583	690	4,553	30.6	7.0	1.9	12.3	
Maurice Martin	G/F	Saint Joseph's	2	1986–1988	69	422	65	49	204	6.1	0.9	0.7	3.0	
Anthony Mason	F	Tennessee State	1	1990–1991	3	21	5	0	10	7.0	1.7	0.0	3.3	
Kelly McCarty	G/F	Southern Miss	1	1998–1999	2	4	3	0	4	2.0	1.5	0.0	2.0	
Ted McClain	G	Tennessee State	1	1976–1977	72	2,002	229	324	589	27.8	3.2	4.5	8.2	
Dan McClintock	C	Northern Arizona	1	2000–2001	6	58	17	1	18	9.7	2.8	0.2	3.0	
George McCloud	G/F	Florida State	3	1999–2002	223	5,955	760	729	2,120	26.7	3.4	3.3	9.5	
Jelani McCoy	C	UCLA	1	2007–2008	6	33	7	0	3	5.5	1.2	0.0	0.5	
Antonio McDyess^{+}	F/C	Alabama	6	1995–1997; 1998–2002	361	12,271	3,231	586	6,555	34.0	9.0	1.6	18.2	
Patrick McFarland	G/F	Saint Joseph's	2	1973–1975	137	1,702	254	180	815	12.4	1.9	1.3	5.9	
JaVale McGee	C	Nevada	4	2011–2015; 2020–21	134	2,293	630	46	1,117	17.1	4.7	0.3	8.3	
Bill McGill	F/C	Utah	1	1968–1969	78	1,760	460	102	1,002	22.6	5.9	1.3	12.8	
George McGinnis^	F/C	Indiana	2	1978–1980	121	3,976	1,326	504	2,418	32.9	11.0	4.2	20.0	
Jeff McInnis	G	North Carolina	1	1996–1997	13	117	6	18	65	9.0	0.5	1.4	5.0	
Billy McKinney	G	Northwestern	3	1980–1983	198	4,656	373	829	2,068	23.5	1.9	4.2	10.4	
Jordan McRae	G/F	Tennessee	1	2019–2020	4	32	5	4	9	8.0	1.3	1.0	2.3	
Darnell Mee	G	Western Kentucky	2	1993–1995	40	293	36	18	76	7.3	0.9	0.5	1.9	
Ron Mercer	G/F	Kentucky	1	1999–2000	37	1,408	152	104	678	38.1	4.1	2.8	18.3	
Loren Meyer	C	Iowa State	1	1998–1999	14	70	16	1	16	5.0	1.1	0.1	1.1	
Andre Miller	G	Utah	7	2003–2007; 2011–2014	447	13,979	1,691	2,978	5,354	31.3	3.8	6.7	12.0	
Mike Miller	G/F	Florida	2	2015–2017	67	524	91	62	91	7.8	1.4	0.9	1.4	
Quincy Miller	F	Baylor	2	2012–2014	59	815	149	29	266	13.8	2.5	0.5	4.5	
Terry Mills	F	Michigan	1	1990–1991	17	279	88	16	128	16.4	5.2	0.9	7.5	
Paul Millsap	F	Louisiana Tech	4	2017–2021	215	5,440	1,305	427	2,531	25.3	6.1	2.0	11.8	
Steve Mix	F	Toledo	1	1971–1972	1	4	1	0	2	4.0	1.0	0.0	2.0	
Andre Moore	F	Loyola (IL)	1	1987–1988	7	34	12	5	20	4.9	1.7	0.7	2.9	
Richie Moore	G	Hiram Scott	1	1967–1968	18	211	19	8	69	11.7	1.1	0.4	3.8	
Monté Morris	G	Iowa State	5	2017–2022	280	7,066	655	1,042	2,947	25.2	2.3	3.7	10.5	
John Morrison	G	Canisius	1	1967–1968	9	76	9	7	27	8.4	1.0	0.8	3.0	
Timofey Mozgov	C	(Russia) Khimki	5	2010–2015	213	3,786	1,103	109	1,444	17.8	5.2	0.5	6.8	
Emmanuel Mudiay	G	(China) Guangdong Southern Tigers	3	2015–2018	165	4,226	504	710	1,834	25.6	3.1	4.3	11.1	
Eric Murdock	G	Providence	1	1996–1997	12	114	11	24	45	9.5	0.9	2.0	3.8	
Jamal Murray*	G	Kentucky	9	2016–2021; 2022–2026	611	19,448	2,348	3,044	11,528	31.8	3.8	5.0	18.9	
Tracy Murray	F	UCLA	1	2000–2001	13	135	22	9	50	10.4	1.7	0.7	3.8	
Willie Murrell	F	Kansas State	1	1967–1968	71	2,495	637	64	1,165	35.1	9.0	0.9	16.4	
Dikembe Mutombo^ (#55)	C	Georgetown	5	1991–1996	391	14,411	4,811	651	5,054	36.9	12.3	1.7	12.9	

=== N to P ===
All-time roster
Player	Pos.	Pre-draft team	Yrs	Seasons	Statistics									Ref.
Player	Pos.	Pre-draft team	Yrs	Seasons	GP	MP	REB	AST	PTS	MPG	RPG	APG	PPG	Ref.
Eduardo Nájera	F	Oklahoma	4	2004–2008	243	5,346	1,097	239	1,487	22.0	4.5	1.0	6.1	
Calvin Natt^{+}	F	Louisiana-Monroe	5	1984–1989	189	5,385	1,193	458	3,369	28.5	6.3	2.4	17.8	
Craig Neal	G	Georgia Tech	1	1990–1991	10	125	16	37	44	12.5	1.6	3.7	4.4	
Jameer Nelson	G	Saint Joseph's	3	2014–2017	148	3,783	373	700	1,313	25.6	2.5	4.7	8.9	
Nenê	F/C	(Brazil) Vasco da Gama	10	2002–2012	555	16,445	3,859	1,014	6,868	29.6	7.0	1.8	12.4	
Johnny Newman	G/F	Richmond	1	1997–1998	74	2,176	141	138	1,089	29.4	1.9	1.9	14.7	
Carl Nicks	G	Indiana State	1	1980–1981	27	493	49	80	165	18.3	1.8	3.0	6.1	
Zeke Nnaji^{x}	F	Arizona	6	2020–2026	303	3,633	702	129	1,243	12.0	2.3	0.4	4.1	
Jusuf Nurkić	C	(Croatia) Cedevita	3	2014–2017	139	2,457	817	150	1,047	17.7	5.9	1.1	7.5	
Johnny O'Bryant III	F/C	LSU	1	2016–2017	7	46	11	2	20	6.6	1.6	0.3	2.9	
Jawann Oldham	C	Seattle	1	1980–1981	4	21	5	0	4	5.3	1.3	0.0	1.0	
Doug Overton	G	La Salle	1	1995–1996	55	607	63	106	182	11.0	1.1	1.9	3.3	
Robert Pack	G	USC	4	1992–1995; 2000–2001	259	5,365	533	1,274	2,427	20.7	2.1	4.9	9.4	
Kostas Papanikolaou	F	(Greece) Olympiacos	1	2015–2016	26	294	40	16	67	11.3	1.5	0.6	2.6	
Charles Parks	F	Idaho State	1	1968–1969	2	5	0	0	0	2.5	0.0	0.0	0.0	
Ruben Patterson	F	Cincinnati	1	2005–2006	26	736	90	67	344	28.3	3.5	2.6	13.2	
Wesley Person	G	Auburn	1	2004–2005	25	461	61	28	202	18.4	2.4	1.1	8.1	
Johan Petro	C	(France) Élan Béarnais Pau-Orthez	2	2008–2010	63	653	192	24	182	10.4	3.0	0.4	2.9	
Walt Piatkowski	F	Bowling Green	2	1968–1970	151	3,121	615	87	1,459	20.7	4.1	0.6	9.7	
Jalen Pickett^{x}	G	Penn State	3	2023–2026	126	1,595	199	243	502	12.7	1.6	1.9	4.0	
Ricky Pierce	G	Rice	1	1996–1997	33	600	53	31	335	18.2	1.6	0.9	10.2	
Mason Plumlee	F/C	Duke	4	2016–2020	244	4,859	1,414	609	1,843	19.9	5.8	2.5	7.6	
Gary Plummer	F/C	Boston University	1	1992–1993	60	737	173	40	281	12.3	2.9	0.7	4.7	
Mark Pope	F	Kentucky	2	2003–2005	13	47	11	1	6	3.6	0.8	0.1	0.5	
Michael Porter Jr.	F	Missouri	6	2019–2025	345	10,036	2,209	485	5,597	29.1	6.4	1.4	16.2	
James Posey	G/F	Xavier	4	1999–2003	261	7,417	1,322	567	2,462	28.4	5.1	2.2	9.4	
Jim Price	G	Louisville	2	1976–1978	104	2,474	343	366	768	23.8	3.3	3.5	7.4	

=== R to S ===
All-time roster
Player	Pos.	Pre-draft team	Yrs	Seasons	Statistics									Ref.
Player	Pos.	Pre-draft team	Yrs	Seasons	GP	MP	REB	AST	PTS	MPG	RPG	APG	PPG	Ref.
Mark Randall	F	Kansas	2	1993–1995	36	194	34	12	64	5.4	0.9	0.3	1.8	
Anthony Randolph	F	LSU	2	2012–2014	82	856	217	44	349	10.4	2.6	0.5	4.3	
Blair Rasmussen	C	Oregon	6	1985–1991	429	9,158	2,558	355	4,319	21.3	6.0	0.8	10.1	
James Ray	F	Jacksonville	3	1980–1983	103	843	228	76	334	8.2	2.2	0.7	3.2	
Eldridge Recasner	G	Washington	1	1994–1995	3	13	2	1	6	4.3	0.7	0.3	2.0	
Davon Reed	G	Miami (FL)	2	2021–2023	83	983	163	72	290	11.8	2.0	0.9	3.5	
Isaiah Rider	G	UNLV	1	2001–2002	10	173	33	12	93	17.3	3.3	1.2	9.3	
Austin Rivers	G	Duke	2	2020–2022	82	1,883	149	129	534	23.0	1.8	1.6	6.5	
Anthony Roberts	G/F	Oral Roberts	4	1977–1981; 1983–1984	187	3,517	769	245	1,531	18.8	4.1	1.3	8.2	
Marv Roberts	F/C	Utah State	3	1971–1974	180	3,651	823	200	1,732	20.3	4.6	1.1	9.6	
Nate Robinson	G	Washington	2	2013–2015	77	1,331	120	189	649	17.3	1.6	2.5	8.4	
Dave Robisch	F/C	Kansas	8	1971–1975; 1981–1984	500	12,288	3,408	903	6,181	24.6	6.8	1.8	12.4	
John Roche	G	South Carolina	3	1979–1982	147	3,398	175	634	1,350	23.1	1.2	4.3	9.2	
David Roddy^{x}	F	Colorado State	1	2025–2026	5	73	20	4	40	14.6	4.0	0.8	8.0	
Rodney Rogers	F	Wake Forest	2	1993–1995	159	3,548	611	262	1,619	22.3	3.8	1.6	10.2	
Roy Rogers	F	Alabama	1	1999–2000	40	355	80	9	89	8.9	2.0	0.2	2.2	
Willie Rogers	G/F	Oklahoma	1	1968–1969	40	294	47	16	85	7.4	1.2	0.4	2.1	
Jalen Rose	G/F	Michigan	2	1994–1996	161	3,932	477	884	1,466	24.4	3.0	5.5	9.1	
Bryon Russell	F	Long Beach State	2	2004–2006	71	1,029	173	73	307	14.5	2.4	1.0	4.3	
Cheikh Samb	C	(Spain) WTC Cornellá	1	2008–2009	6	24	9	1	4	4.0	1.5	0.2	0.7	
JaKarr Sampson	G/F	St. John's	1	2015–2016	26	469	61	16	134	18.0	2.3	0.6	5.2	
Jamal Sampson	F/C	California	1	2006–2007	22	125	48	5	24	5.7	2.2	0.2	1.1	
Dario Šarić	C	[ (Croatia) Cibona	1	2024–2025	16	210	50	23	56	13.1	3.1	1.4	3.5	
Kenny Satterfield	G	Cincinnati	2	2001–2003	58	980	87	161	312	16.9	1.5	2.8	5.4	
Predrag Savović	G	Hawaii	1	2002–2003	27	256	25	22	83	9.5	0.9	0.8	3.1	
Danny Schayes	F/C	Syracuse	8	1982–1990	536	11,096	3,086	605	5,029	20.7	5.8	1.1	9.4	
Steve Scheffler	F/C	Purdue	1	1991–1992	7	46	11	0	12	6.6	1.6	0.0	1.7	
Charlie Scott^	G/F	North Carolina	2	1978–1980	148	4,477	376	678	1,586	30.3	2.5	4.6	10.7	
Shawnelle Scott	C	St. John's	1	2001–2002	21	252	103	8	82	12.0	4.9	0.4	3.9	
Don Sidle	F/C	Oklahoma	1	1970–1971	54	1,623	488	66	870	30.1	9.0	1.2	16.1	
Paul Silas	F/C	Creighton	1	1976–1977	81	1,959	606	132	582	24.2	7.5	1.6	7.2	
Grant Simmons	G	Nebraska	2	1967–1969	95	2,516	266	197	858	26.5	2.8	2.1	9.0	
KJ Simpson^{x}	G	Colorado	1	2025–2026	6	34	8	8	7	5.7	1.3	1.3	1.2	
Ralph Simpson	G/F	Michigan State	7	1970–1976; 1977–1978	519	16,227	2,246	1,950	10,130	31.3	4.3	3.8	19.5	
Reggie Slater	F	Wyoming	2	1994–1996	29	262	64	14	134	9.0	2.2	0.5	4.6	
Al Smith	G	Bradley	3	1971–1974	242	6,542	681	1,345	2,519	27.0	2.8	5.6	10.4	
Charles Smith	G	New Mexico	1	2005–2006	1	2	0	0	0	2.0	0.0	0.0	0.0	
Ish Smith	G	Wake Forest	1	2022–2023	43	398	54	100	108	9.3	2.5	1.3	2.3	
J. R. Smith	G/F	Saint Benedict's Prep. (NJ)	5	2006–2011	372	9,187	1,148	804	5,084	24.7	3.1	2.2	13.7	
Joe Smith	F	Maryland	1	2006–2007	11	148	40	3	56	13.5	3.6	0.3	5.1	
Kenny Smith	G	North Carolina	1	1996–1997	33	654	37	102	260	19.8	1.1	3.1	7.9	
Otis Smith	G/F	Jacksonville	2	1986–1988	43	359	64	33	173	8.3	1.5	0.8	4.0	
Robert Smith	G	UNLV	2	1977–1979	127	1,857	182	247	648	14.6	1.4	1.9	5.1	
Elmore Spencer	C	UNLV	1	1995–1996	6	21	4	0	0	3.5	0.7	0.0	0.0	
Bryant Stith	G	Virginia	8	1992–2000	458	13,248	1,614	968	4,982	28.9	3.5	2.1	10.9	
Jarnell Stokes	F/C	Tennessee	1	2016–2017	2	7	2	2	3	3.5	1.0	1.0	1.5	
Julyan Stone	G	UTEP	2	2011–2013	26	207	28	39	43	8.0	1.1	1.5	1.7	
Julian Strawther^{x}	G/F	Gonzaga	3	2023–2026	172	2,790	317	191	1,228	16.2	1.8	1.1	7.1	
Mark Strickland	F	Temple	1	2000–2001	46	517	120	17	201	11.2	2.6	0.4	4.4	

=== T to V ===
All-time roster
Player	Pos.	Pre-draft team	Yrs	Seasons	Statistics									Ref.
Player	Pos.	Pre-draft team	Yrs	Seasons	GP	MP	REB	AST	PTS	MPG	RPG	APG	PPG	Ref.
Levern Tart	G/F	Bradley	1	1968–1969	20	345	51	44	154	17.3	2.6	2.2	7.7	
Brian Taylor	G	Princeton	1	1977–1978	39	1,222	98	132	452	31.3	2.5	3.4	11.6	
Fatty Taylor	G	La Salle	2	1974–1975; 1976–1977	155	3,566	432	625	938	23.0	2.8	4.0	6.1	
Johnny Taylor	F	Chattanooga	2	1998–2000	37	729	102	24	207	19.7	2.8	0.6	5.6	
Claude Terry	G/F	Stanford	4	1972–1976	277	3,592	438	392	1,647	13.0	1.6	1.4	5.9	
Floyd Theard	G	Kentucky State	1	1969–1970	25	406	51	44	96	16.2	2.0	1.8	3.8	
Isaiah Thomas	G	Washington	1	2018–2019	12	181	13	23	97	15.1	1.1	1.9	8.1	
Willis Thomas	G	Tennessee State	1	1967–1968	24	542	58	25	294	22.6	2.4	1.0	12.3	
Brooks Thompson	G	Oklahoma State	1	1996–1997	65	1,047	96	179	445	16.1	1.5	2.8	6.8	
David Thompson^ (#33)	G/F	NC State	7	1975–1982	498	16,902	2,132	1,704	11,992	33.9	4.3	3.4	24.1	
LaSalle Thompson	F/C	Texas	1	1996–1997	17	105	26	0	7	6.2	1.5	0.0	0.4	
Axel Toupane	G/F	(France) SIG Strasbourg	1	2015–2016	21	305	31	15	76	14.5	1.5	0.7	3.6	
Monte Towe	G	NC State	2	1975–1977	115	985	89	223	319	8.6	0.8	1.9	2.8	
John Trapp	F	UNLV	1	1972–1973	24	342	72	20	127	14.3	3.0	0.8	5.3	
Jeff Trepagnier	G	USC	2	2002–2004	19	193	31	10	70	10.2	1.6	0.5	3.7	
Nikoloz Tskitishvili	F	(Italy) Benetton Treviso	3	2002–2005	143	1,785	273	105	455	12.5	1.9	0.7	3.2	
Rayjon Tucker	G	Little Rock	1	2021–2022	3	29	4	4	6	9.7	1.3	1.3	2.0	
Elston Turner	G/F	Ole Miss	3	1984–1986; 1988–1989	232	4,561	704	467	1,120	19.7	3.0	2.0	4.8	
Hunter Tyson	F	Clemson	3	2023–2026	90	610	123	39	200	6.8	1.4	0.4	2.2	
Jonas Valančiūnas^{x}	C	(Lithuania) Rytas	1	2025–2026	65	871	329	78	567	13.4	5.1	1.2	8.7	
Ronnie Valentine	F	Old Dominion	1	1980–1981	24	123	30	7	84	5.1	1.3	0.3	3.5	
Jan van Breda Kolff	G/F	Vanderbilt	1	1974–1975	84	1,639	358	181	487	19.5	4.3	2.2	5.8	
Nick Van Exel	G	Cincinnati	4	1998–2002	245	9,179	834	2,047	4,325	37.5	3.4	8.4	17.7	
Jarred Vanderbilt	F	Kentucky	2	2018–2021	26	110	31	9	34	4.2	1.2	0.2	1.3	
Kiki VanDeWeghe^{+}	F	UCLA	4	1980–1984	293	9,794	1,541	782	6,829	33.4	5.3	2.7	23.3	
Bob Verga	G	Duke	1	1968–1969	6	150	21	11	67	25.0	3.5	1.8	11.2	
Jan Veselý	F	(Serbia) Partizan	1	2013–2014	21	306	78	11	93	14.6	3.7	0.5	4.4	
Jay Vincent	F	Michigan State	2	1987–1989	78	1,850	327	148	1,156	23.7	4.2	1.9	14.8	
Noah Vonleh	F/C	Indiana	1	2019–2020	7	30	8	2	13	4.3	1.1	0.3	1.9	

=== W to Z ===
All-time roster
Player	Pos.	Pre-draft team	Yrs	Seasons	Statistics									Ref.
Player	Pos.	Pre-draft team	Yrs	Seasons	GP	MP	REB	AST	PTS	MPG	RPG	APG	PPG	Ref.
Von Wafer	G	Florida State	1	2007–2008	21	90	10	5	27	4.3	0.5	0.2	1.3	
Darrell Walker	G	Arkansas	1	1986–1987	81	2,020	327	282	988	24.9	4.0	3.5	12.2	
Dwight Waller	F	Tennessee State	2	1969–1970; 1971–1972	9	97	43	5	33	10.8	4.8	0.6	3.7	
Ben Warley	G/F	Tennessee State	1	1969–1970	42	475	110	30	193	11.3	2.6	0.7	4.6	
Donald Washington	F	North Carolina	1	1974–1975	50	438	89	30	196	8.8	1.8	0.6	3.9	
Eric Washington	G	Alabama	2	1997–1999	104	2,300	216	108	716	22.1	2.1	1.0	6.9	
Earl Watson	G	UCLA	1	2005–2006	46	975	86	160	347	21.2	1.9	3.5	7.5	
Peyton Watson^{x}	G/F	UCLA	4	2022–2026	225	4,928	792	302	1,947	21.9	3.5	1.3	8.7	
Marvin Webster	C	Morgan State	2	1975–1977	118	1,674	658	92	704	14.2	5.6	0.8	6.0	
Sonny Weems	G/F	Arkansas	1	2008–2009	12	55	4	3	19	4.6	0.3	0.3	1.6	
Thomas Welsh	C	UCLA	1	2018–2019	11	36	4	5	18	3.3	0.4	0.5	1.6	
Robert Werdann	C	St. John's	1	1992–1993	28	149	52	7	53	5.3	1.9	0.3	1.9	
Russell Westbrook	G	UCLA	1	2024–2025	75	2,092	370	457	994	27.9	4.9	6.1	13.3	
Tyson Wheeler	G	Rhode Island	1	1998–1999	1	3	0	2	4	3.0	0.0	2.0	4.0	
Jack White	G	Duke	1	2022–2023	17	66	17	4	21	3.9	1.2	1.0	0.2	
Rodney White	F	Charlotte	3	2002–2005	186	3,079	452	217	1,427	16.6	2.4	1.2	7.7	
Willie White	G	Chattanooga	2	1984–1986	82	577	80	82	302	7.0	1.0	1.0	3.7	
Chris Whitney	G	Clemson	1	2002–2003	29	762	46	124	277	26.3	1.6	4.3	9.6	
Greg Whittington	F	Georgetown	1	2020–2021	4	12	0	0	0	3.0	0.0	0.0	0.0	
Ken Wilburn	F	Central State	1	1968–1969	37	409	177	22	174	11.1	4.8	0.6	4.7	
Bob Wilkerson	G/F	Indiana	3	1977–1980	236	7,586	1,204	966	2,865	32.1	5.1	4.1	12.1	
Mike Wilks	G	Rice	1	2007–2008	8	122	12	6	24	15.3	1.5	0.8	3.0	
Aaron Williams	F/C	Xavier	1	1996–1997	1	10	5	0	6	10.0	5.0	0.0	6.0	
Brian Williams	F/C	Arizona	2	1993–1995	143	2,768	744	103	1,137	19.4	5.2	0.7	8.0	
Chuck Williams	G	Colorado	3	1971–1972; 1975–1977	184	4,420	401	579	1,697	24.0	2.2	3.1	9.2	
Eric Williams	F	Providence	2	1997–1999	42	925	102	49	356	22.0	2.4	1.2	8.5	
Monty Williams	F	Notre Dame	1	1998–1999	1	6	0	0	1	6.0	0.0	0.0	1.0	
Pete Williams	F	Arizona	2	1985–1987	58	583	147	15	153	10.1	2.5	0.3	2.6	
Reggie Williams	G/F	Georgetown	6	1990–1996	419	12,556	1,923	1,222	5,934	30.0	4.6	2.9	14.2	
Rob Williams	G	Houston	2	1982–1984	153	3,367	330	825	1,319	22.0	2.2	5.4	8.6	
Scott Williams	F/C	North Carolina	1	2001–2002	41	737	209	13	202	18.0	5.1	0.3	4.9	
Shammond Williams	G	North Carolina	1	2002–2003	27	712	61	138	255	26.4	2.3	5.1	9.4	
Shelden Williams	F	Duke	1	2010–2011	42	713	223	19	198	17.0	5.3	0.5	4.7	
Kevin Willis	F/C	Michigan State	1	2000–2001	43	1,059	309	29	413	24.6	7.2	0.7	9.6	
Steve Wilson	G	Hanover	2	1970–1972	48	297	52	35	148	6.2	1.1	0.7	3.1	
Willie Wise	F	Drake	1	1976–1977	75	1,403	253	142	616	18.7	3.4	1.9	8.2	
Greg Wittman	F	Western Carolina	1	1969–1970	50	453	98	15	196	9.1	2.0	0.3	3.9	
Joe Wolf	F/C	North Carolina	3	1990–1992; 1997–1998	198	3,374	766	198	880	17.0	3.9	1.0	4.4	
Randy Woods	G	La Salle	1	1995–1996	8	72	6	12	19	9.0	0.8	1.5	2.4	
Orlando Woolridge	F	Notre Dame	1	1990–1991	53	1,823	361	119	1,330	34.4	6.8	2.2	25.1	
Tom Workman	F/C	Seattle	1	1970–1971	39	489	133	37	236	12.5	3.4	0.9	6.1	
Brad Wright	F	UCLA	1	1987–1988	2	7	1	0	2	3.5	0.5	0.0	1.0	
Lonnie Wright	G	Colorado State	4	1967–1971	227	6,440	691	453	2,728	28.4	3.0	2.0	12.0	
Vincent Yarbrough	G/F	Tennessee	1	2002–2003	59	1,381	162	130	406	23.4	2.7	2.2	6.9	
Nick Young	G/F	USC	1	2018–2019	4	37	1	2	9	9.3	0.3	0.5	2.3	
George Zidek	C	UCLA	2	1996–1998	22	130	36	6	70	5.9	1.6	0.3	3.2	
