= 1967–68 Denver Rockets season =

ABA professional basketball team season

- Head coach: Bob Bass
- Owners: J. William Ringsby; Donald W. Ringsby
- Arena: Denver Auditorium Arena

Results
- Record: 45–33 (.577)
- Place: Division: 3rd (Western)
- Playoff finish: Western Division semifinals (lost to Buccaneers 2–3)

The 1967–68 ABA season marked the inaugural season of both the American Basketball Association and the Denver Rockets. Initially, the team was meant to play in Kansas City out in Missouri, but was able to relocate themselves to Denver in time for the start of the 1967 ABA draft due to a lack of suitable playing arenas; they then also considered the ideas of Denver Larks and Denver Lark Buntings as team names for the franchise at first before an eleventh hour purchase by Bill Ringsby and his son Don Ringsby (who had owned the local Ringsby Rocket Truck Lines business at that point in time) that helped save the franchise before they even had a chance to play a single game caused the team to change their team name to the Denver Rockets (primarily as a promotion to the Ringsby Rocket Truck Lines business at hand) before the season officially began. This was the first time that professional basketball was officially played in the city of Denver since the original Denver Nuggets left the NBA in 1950 after the season it was created through the merger of the Basketball Association of America and National Basketball League (which the original Nuggets were first a part of) and then since the rebranded Denver Frontier Refiners of the short-lived National Professional Basketball League left Denver in January 1951 to briefly become the Evansville Agogans. The Rockets finished the season with a 45–33 record, which was good enough to qualify for a playoff spot as the third seed out of four playoff teams in the Western Division. However, they would lose to the New Orleans Buccaneers in the first round, with the Buccaneers later reaching the first ABA Finals in league history before losing the championship match-up to the Pittsburgh Pipers. Still, this was their first of three consecutive playoff appearances and first of ten playoff appearances in the franchise's first twelve years of existence.

== Roster ==
1967–68 Denver Rockets roster
Players

Pos.	No.	Player	Height	Weight	DOB	From
C	40	Byron Beck	6 ft 9 in (2.06 m)	225 lb (102 kg)	January 25, 1945	Denver
PF	50	Tommie Bowens	6 ft 8 in (2.03 m)	220 lb (100 kg)	July 7, 1940	Grambling State
PG	14, 23	Jeffrey Congdon	6 ft 1 in (1.85 m)	180 lb (82 kg)	October 17, 1943	BYU
PF	12	Chuck Gardner	6 ft 8 in (2.03 m)	205 lb (93 kg)	September 30, 1944	Colorado
SF	22	Julian Hammond	6 ft 5 in (1.96 m)	205 lb (93 kg)	May 27, 1943	Tulsa
PF	54	Wayne Hightower	6 ft 8 in (2.03 m)	192 lb (87 kg)	January 14, 1940	Kansas
C	24	Tom Hoover	6 ft 9 in (2.06 m)	230 lb (104 kg)	January 23, 1941	Villanova
SF	30	Ron Horn	6 ft 7 in (2.01 m)	220 lb (100 kg)	May 24, 1938	Indiana
PG	32	Larry Jones	6 ft 2 in (1.88 m)	180 lb (82 kg)	September 22, 1942	Toledo
G	30	R.B. Lynam	6 ft 1 in (1.85 m)	190 lb (86 kg)	1944	Oklahoma Baptist
SG	30	Richie Moore	6 ft 2 in (1.88 m)	190 lb (86 kg)	1945	Hiram Scott College
G	14	John Morrison	6 ft 2 in (1.88 m)	190 lb (86 kg)	May 2, 1945	Canisius
SF	44	Willie Murrell	6 ft 6 in (1.98 m)	225 lb (102 kg)	September 13, 1941	Kansas State
PG	10	Grant Simmons	6 ft 3 in (1.91 m)	190 lb (86 kg)	March 7, 1943	Nebraska
SG	20	Willis Thomas	6 ft 2 in (1.88 m)	185 lb (84 kg)	1937	Tennessee State
SG	42	Lonnie Wright	6 ft 2 in (1.88 m)	205 lb (93 kg)	January 23, 1944	Colorado State

Coaches
Head coach
- Bob Bass

Legend
- (DP) Unsigned draft pick
- (FA) Free agent
- (S) Suspended
- Injured

Roster

== Season standings ==
=== Eastern Division ===
Team	Wins	Loses	Pct.
Pittsburgh Pipers	54	24	.692
Minnesota Muskies	50	28	.641
Indiana Pacers	38	40	.487
Kentucky Colonels	36	42	.462
New Jersey Americans	36	42	.462

=== Western Division ===
Team	Wins	Loses	Pct.
New Orleans Buccaneers	48	30	.615
Dallas Chaparrals	46	32	.590
Denver Rockets	45	33	.577
Houston Mavericks	29	49	.372
Anaheim Amigos	25	53	.321
Oakland Oaks	22	56	.282

== ABA Playoffs ==
1968 playoff game log
ABA Western Division Semifinals: 2–3 (home: 2–0; road: 0–3)

Game	Date	Team	Score	High points	High rebounds	High assists	Location Attendance	Series
1	March 26	@ New Orleans	L 104–130	Larry Jones (29)	Wayne Hightower (12)		Loyola Field House; 3,111	0–1
2	March 27	@ New Orleans	L 93–105	Willie Murrell (21)	Byron Beck (15)		Loyola Field House; 3,622	0–2
3	March 30	New Orleans	W 105–98	Wayne Hightower (28)	Willie Murrell (11)		Denver Auditorium Arena; 13,359	1–2
4	March 31	New Orleans	W 108–100	Willie Murrell (28)	Byron Beck (18)		Denver Auditorium Arena; 3,485	2–2
5	April 3	@ New Orleans	L 97–102	Willie Murrell (26)	Murrel, Beck, Hammond (9 each)		Loyola Field House; 6,500	2–3

1968 schedule

Rockets lose series, 3–2

== Game log ==
- 1967-68 Denver Rockets Schedule and Results | Basketball-Reference.com

== Statistics ==
Num	Name	University	Pos	GP	Reb	Asts	Pts	RPG	APG	PPG
10	Grant Simmons	Nebraska	G	78	240	182	793	3.1	2.3	10.2
12	Charles Gardner	Colorado	F	42	136	13	197	3.2	0.3	4.7
14	Jeff Congdon	Brigham Young	G	41	34	59	159	0.8	1.4	3.9
14	John Morrison	Canisius	G	9	9	7	27	1.0	0.8	3.0
20	Willis Thomas	Tennessee State	G	24	58	25	294	2.4	1.0	12.3
22	Julian Hammond	Tulsa	C/F	74	327	62	591	4.4	0.8	8.0
24	Tom Hoover	Villanova	C	70	491	64	454	7.0	0.9	6.5
30	R. B. Lynam	Oklahoma Baptist	G	7	5	0	17	0.7	0.0	2.4
30	Ron Horn	Indiana	F	1	1	0	2	1.0	0.0	2.0
30	Richard Moore	Hiram Scott	18	19	8	69	1.1	0.4	3.8	6.4
32	Larry Jones	Toledo	G	76	599	270	1742	7.9	3.6	22.9
40	Byron Beck	Denver	C/F	71	559	38	669	7.9	0.5	9.4
42	Lonnie Wright	Colorado State	G	38	96	68	373	2.5	1.8	9.8
44	Willie Murrell	Kansas State	F	71	637	164	1165	9.0	0.9	16.4
50	Tom Bowens	Grambling	F/C	67	374	41	410	5.6	0.6	6.1
54	Wayne Hightower	Kansas	F	74	536	143	1282	7.2	1.9	17.3

== Awards and records ==
- ABA All-Star: Larry Jones
- ABA All-League Team: Larry Jones
