= 1968–69 Denver Rockets season =

ABA professional basketball team season

- Head coach: Bob Bass
- Owners: J. William Ringsby; Donald W. Ringsby
- Arena: Denver Auditorium Arena

Results
- Record: 44–34 (.564)
- Place: Division: 3rd (Western)
- Playoff finish: ABA Western Division Semifinals (lost to Oaks 3–4)
- Stats at Basketball Reference
- Radio: KTLN

The 1968–69 ABA season was the second season of the Denver Rockets franchise. They ended their season with one less win compared to last season, but still ended up in the playoffs once again as a third place team. Out of the 11 ABA teams that season, the Rockets were ranked second in offensive rating.

== Roster ==
1968–69 Denver Rockets roster
Players

Pos.	No.	Player	Height	Weight	DOB	From
C	40	Byron Beck	6 ft 9 in (2.06 m)	225 lb (102 kg)	January 25, 1945	Denver
C	52	Larry Bunce	7 ft 0 in (2.13 m)	240 lb (109 kg)	July 29, 1945	Utah State
PG	14	Jeffrey Congdon	6 ft 1 in (1.85 m)	180 lb (82 kg)	October 17, 1943	BYU
SF	12	John Fairchild	6 ft 8 in (2.03 m)	205 lb (93 kg)	April 28, 1943	BYU
SF	22	Julian Hammond	6 ft 5 in (1.96 m)	205 lb (93 kg)	May 27, 1943	Tulsa
PF	54	Wayne Hightower	6 ft 8 in (2.03 m)	192 lb (87 kg)	January 14, 1940	Kansas
PG	32	Larry Jones	6 ft 2 in (1.88 m)	180 lb (82 kg)	September 22, 1942	Toledo
C	24	Bill McGill	6 ft 9 in (2.06 m)	225 lb (102 kg)	September 16, 1939	Utah
F	50	Charles Parks	6 ft 5 in (1.96 m)	210 lb (95 kg)	1946	Idaho State
PF	34	Walter Piatkowski	6 ft 8 in (2.03 m)	220 lb (100 kg)	June 11, 1945	Bowling Green
SG	44	Willie Rogers	6 ft 3 in (1.91 m)	185 lb (84 kg)	September 11, 1945	Oklahoma
PG	10	Grant Simmons	6 ft 3 in (1.91 m)	190 lb (86 kg)	March 7, 1943	Nebraska
SG	12	Levern Tart	6 ft 2 in (1.88 m)	195 lb (88 kg)	June 1, 1942	Bradley
SG	11	Bob Verga	6 ft 1 in (1.85 m)	190 lb (86 kg)	September 7, 1945	Duke
SF	30	Ken Wilburn	6 ft 6 in (1.98 m)	195 lb (88 kg)	June 8, 1944	Central State
SG	42	Lonnie Wright	6 ft 2 in (1.88 m)	205 lb (93 kg)	January 23, 1944	Colorado State

Coaches
Head coach
- Bob Bass

Legend
- (DP) Unsigned draft pick
- (FA) Free agent
- (S) Suspended
- Injured

Roster

== Season standings ==
=== Western Division ===
Team	W	L	PCT.	GB
Oakland Oaks	60	18	.769	-
New Orleans Buccaneers	46	32	.590	14
Denver Rockets	44	34	.564	16
Dallas Chaparrals	41	37	.526	19
Los Angeles Stars	33	45	.423	27
Houston Mavericks	23	55	.295	37

== Game log ==
- 1968-69 Denver Rockets Schedule and Results | Basketball-Reference.com

== Statistics ==
Rk	Player	Age	G	MP	FG	FGA	FG%	3P	3PA	3P%	2P	2PA	2P%	FT	FTA	FT%	ORB	DRB	TRB	AST	TOV	PF	PTS
1	Larry Jones	26	75	40.6	10.1	21.7	.465	0.3	1.3	.240	9.8	20.4	.480	7.9	10.1	.778	2.2	4.4	6.6	3.4	2.9	3.6	28.4
2	Lonnie Wright	25	69	36.8	6.6	15.8	.416	0.3	1.2	.221	6.3	14.5	.433	3.0	4.0	.743	0.7	3.5	4.2	2.5	2.3	3.6	16.4
3	Wayne Hightower	29	67	34.6	4.6	11.4	.408	0.0	0.0	.000	4.6	11.3	.409	4.6	6.4	.730	2.3	7.3	9.6	3.0	2.6	3.6	13.9
4	Byron Beck	24	71	32.2	6.0	11.9	.502	0.0	0.0	.667	5.9	11.8	.501	2.6	3.4	.765	3.8	7.1	11.0	1.1	1.3	3.5	14.5
5	Julian Hammond	25	78	29.9	4.2	7.7	.547	0.0	0.0		4.2	7.7	.547	2.1	3.2	.652	3.4	4.3	7.7	1.6	1.9	2.7	10.6
6	Bob Verga	23	6	25.0	4.0	12.8	.312	0.2	0.5	.333	3.8	12.3	.311	3.0	4.7	.643	1.7	1.8	3.5	1.8	4.2	2.7	11.2
7	Walter Piatkowski	23	77	23.6	5.2	12.4	.417	0.4	1.1	.329	4.8	11.4	.426	1.5	2.0	.775	1.9	2.8	4.7	0.6	1.3	2.9	12.2
8	Bill McGill	29	78	22.6	5.3	9.6	.552	0.0	0.0		5.3	9.6	.552	2.3	3.4	.682	1.9	4.0	5.9	1.3	1.9	3.7	12.8
9	Levern Tart	26	20	17.3	2.8	8.0	.352	0.0	0.1	.000	2.8	7.9	.357	2.1	2.8	.750	1.3	1.3	2.6	2.2	2.1	2.0	7.7
10	Jeffrey Congdon	25	59	16.6	1.8	4.7	.386	0.1	0.5	.161	1.7	4.2	.415	1.2	1.4	.812	0.2	1.3	1.6	2.3	1.6	1.8	4.9
11	Grant Simmons	25	17	14.8	1.3	3.5	.373	0.1	0.1	.500	1.2	3.4	.368	1.2	1.7	.690	0.4	1.2	1.5	0.9	1.0	2.5	3.8
12	John Fairchild	25	11	12.3	1.1	3.1	.353	0.0	0.0		1.1	3.1	.353	1.5	2.2	.667	0.6	1.0	1.6	0.8	1.4	0.7	3.6
13	Ken Wilburn	24	37	11.1	1.9	4.9	.398	0.0	0.0		1.9	4.9	.398	0.8	1.5	.526	2.2	2.6	4.8	0.6	1.0	1.5	4.7
14	Larry Bunce	23	23	9.8	1.0	2.6	.373	0.0	0.0		1.0	2.6	.373	2.1	3.0	.700	0.7	1.8	2.5	0.1	0.9	1.9	4.0
15	Willie Rogers	23	40	7.4	0.7	2.0	.338	0.0	0.1	.000	0.7	1.9	.351	0.8	1.3	.596	0.4	0.8	1.2	0.4	0.8	1.3	2.1
16	Charles Parks		2	2.5	0.0	0.5	.000	0.0	0.0		0.0	0.5	.000	0.0	0.0		0.0	0.0	0.0	0.0	0.0	0.5	0.0

== ABA Playoffs ==
ABA Western Division Semifinals

Game	Date	Location	Score	Record	Attendance
1	April 5	Oakland	99–129	0–1	2,358
2	April 6	Oakland	122–119	1–1	1,580
3	April 8	Denver	99–121	1–2	5,062
4	April 10	Denver	109–108	2–2	5,431
5	April 12	Oakland	118–128	2–3	3,156
6	April 13	Denver	126–115	3–3	6,481
7	April 16	Oakland	102-115	3–4	5,123

Rockets lose series, 4–3

== Awards and records ==
- ABA All-Stars: Larry Jones, Byron Beck, Wayne Hightower
- ABA All-League Team: Larry Jones
- League-leading scorer: Larry Jones
