= Jerry Lee (disambiguation) =

Jerry Lee (born 1936) is an American businessman in the radio industry.

Jerry Lee may also refer to:

- Jerry C. Lee, academic
- Jerry Lee, character in K-9 (film)

== See also ==
- Jerry Lee Lewis (1935–2022), American singer, songwriter and pianist
- Jerry Lee Wells (1944–2014), American basketball player
- Gerry Lee, animal impersonator
- Jerry Leigh, musician in Dear Enemy
- Jeremy Lee (disambiguation)
- Gerald Lee (disambiguation)
- Gerard Lee, screenwriter
- Jeremiah Lee, owner of Jeremiah Lee Mansion
