= 1967–68 New Orleans Buccaneers season =

- Division champions
- Head coach: Babe McCarthy
- Arena: Loyola Field House

Results
- Record: 48–30 (.615)
- Place: Division: 1st
- Playoff finish: Lost in ABA Finals

The 1967–68 New Orleans Buccaneers season was the 1st season of the ABA and of the Buccaneers. The Pipers finished first in the Western Division, going all the way to the ABA Finals.

In the Western Division semifinals, the Bucs beat the Denver Rockets in five games. In the Division Finals, they won three straight over the Dallas Chaparrals to win the series in five games. In the ABA Finals, the Bucs and the Pittsburgh Pipers split the six games of the series (with a Game 6 loss at home) that set up a pivotal Game 7 in Pittsburgh. The Pipers won the game and the Finals 122–113.

== Roster ==
1967–68 New Orleans Buccaneers roster
Players

Pos.	No.	Player	Height	Weight	DOB	From
SF	24	Jesse Branson	6 ft 7 in (2.01 m)	195 lb (88 kg)	January 7, 1942	Elon
PG	11	Larry Brown	5 ft 9 in (1.75 m)	160 lb (73 kg)	September 14, 1940	North Carolina
F	23	John Comeaux	6 ft 5 in (1.96 m)	193 lb (88 kg)	September 15, 1943	Grambling State
C	31	John Dickson	6 ft 10 in (2.08 m)	240 lb (109 kg)	November 18, 1945	Arkansas State
C	25	Gerald Govan	6 ft 10 in (2.08 m)	220 lb (100 kg)	January 2, 1942	Saint Mary of the Plains College
SG	15	Jimmy Jones	6 ft 4 in (1.93 m)	188 lb (85 kg)	January 1, 1945	Grambling State
SG	22	Leland Mitchell	6 ft 4 in (1.93 m)	210 lb (95 kg)	February 22, 1941	Mississippi State
SF	34	Doug Moe	6 ft 5 in (1.96 m)	215 lb (98 kg)	September 21, 1938	North Carolina
PF	32	Jackie Moreland	6 ft 7 in (2.01 m)	215 lb (98 kg)	March 11, 1938	Louisiana Tech
SG	12	Marlbert Pradd	6 ft 3 in (1.91 m)	170 lb (77 kg)	November 17, 1944	Dillard
C	21	Red Robbins	6 ft 8 in (2.03 m)	190 lb (86 kg)	September 30, 1944	Tennessee
G	14	Red Stroud	6 ft 0 in (1.83 m)	160 lb (73 kg)	May 2, 1941	Mississippi State
F	23	Ron Widby	6 ft 4 in (1.93 m)	210 lb (95 kg)	March 9, 1945	Tennessee

Coaches
Head coach
- Babe McCarthy

Legend
- (DP) Unsigned draft pick
- (FA) Free agent
- (S) Suspended
- Injured

Roster

== Final standings ==
=== Western Division ===
Team	W	L	PCT.	GB
New Orleans Buccaneers	48	30	.615	–
Dallas Chaparrals	46	32	.590	2
Denver Rockets	45	33	.577	3
Houston Mavericks	29	49	.372	19
Anaheim Amigos	25	53	.321	23
Oakland Oaks	22	56	.282	26

== ABA Playoffs ==
ABA Western Division Semifinals

Game	Date	Opponent	Score	Record	Attendance
1	March 26	Denver	W 130–104	1–0	3,111
2	March 27	Denver	W 105–93	2–0	3,622
3	March 30	@ Denver	L 98–105	1–2	3,678
4	March 31	@ Denver	L 100–108	2–2	3,485
5	April 3	Denver	W 102–97	3–2	4,500

Buccaneers win series, 3–2

ABA Western Division Finals

Game	Date	Opponent	Score	Record	Attendance
1	April 5	Dallas	W 104–99	1–0	3,332
2	April 9	Dallas	L 109–112	1–1	5,287
3	April 10	@ Dallas	W 110–107	2–1	4,825
4	April 11	@ Dallas	W 119–103	3–1	3,623
5	April 13	Dallas	W 108–107	4–1	4,614

Buccaneers win series, 4–1

ABA Finals

Game	Date	Opponent	Score	Record	Attendance
1	April 18	@ Pittsburgh	L 112–120	0–1	2,665
2	April 20	@ Pittsburgh	W 109–100	1–1	3,877
3	April 24	Pittsburgh	W 109–101	2–1	6,300
4	April 25	Pittsburgh	L 105–106 (OT)	2–2	7,000
5	April 27	@ Pittsburgh	W 111–108	3–2	3,347
6	May 1	Pittsburgh	L 112–118	3–3	7,200
7	May 4	@ Pittsburgh	L 113–122	3–4	11,457

Buccaneers lose series, 4–3

== Awards, records, and honors ==
1968 ABA All-Star Game played on January 9, 1968

- Doug Moe
- Larry Brown
- Jimmy Jones
- Red Robbins

Brown (7-of-9 for 17 points) was named the ABA All–Star MVP.
