= Robert Lynam =

Robert Lynam may refer to:

- R. B. Lynam (born 1944), basketball player
- Robert Lynam (writer) (1796–1845), English cleric, schoolteacher, writer and editor
