= Jeremy Lee =

Jeremy Lee or Leigh may refer to:

- Jeremy Lee (chef), British celebrity chef
- Jeremy Lee (singer), member of Hong Kong boy group Mirror
- Jeremy Leigh, character in The Gingerdead Man

== See also ==
- Jerry Lee (disambiguation)
