= Gerald Lee =

Gerald Lee may refer to:

- Gerald Bruce Lee (born 1952), judge on the United States District Court
- Gerald Lee (basketball) (born 1987), Finnish basketball player
- Gerald Stanley Lee (1862–1944), American Congregational clergyman and author

== See also ==
- Jerry Lee (disambiguation)
