= 1966 NBA draft =

Basketball player selection

General information
- Sport: Basketball
- Dates: May 11, 1966 (Rounds 1–8); May 12, 1966 (Rounds 9–19)
- Location: Plaza Hotel (New York City, New York)

Overview
- 112 total selections in 19 rounds
- League: NBA
- First selection: Cazzie Russell, New York Knicks
- Hall of Famers: 2: G Dave Bing; G Lou Hudson

The 1966 NBA draft was the 20th annual draft of the National Basketball Association (NBA). The draft was held on May 11 and 12, 1966, before the 1966–67 season. In this draft, ten NBA teams took turns selecting amateur U.S. college basketball players. A player who had finished his four-year college eligibility was eligible for selection. If a player left college early, he would not be eligible for selection until his college class graduated. The first two picks in the draft belonged to the teams that finished last in each division, with the order determined by a coin flip. The New York Knicks won the coin flip and were awarded the first overall pick, while the Detroit Pistons were awarded the second pick. This draft was the first to use the coin flip method, which replaced the territorial pick rule. The remaining first-round picks and the subsequent rounds were assigned to teams in reverse order of their win–loss record in the previous season. An expansion franchise, the Chicago Bulls, took part in the NBA Draft for the first time and were assigned the last pick of each round. The draft consisted of 19 rounds comprising 112 players selected.

With the elimination of territorial picks and incorporation of a coin flip for the No. 1 overall pick, 1966 is considered the first modern NBA draft.

== Draft selections and draftee career notes ==
Cazzie Russell from the University of Michigan was selected first overall by the New York Knicks. Dave Bing from Syracuse University, who went on to win the Rookie of the Year Award in his first season, was drafted second by the Detroit Pistons. He was named in the 50 Greatest Players in NBA History list announced at the league's 50th anniversary in 1996 and has also been inducted to the Basketball Hall of Fame. He was selected to three All-NBA Teams and seven All-Star Games. He became a politician after ending his playing career and won the election to become the mayor of Detroit in 2009.

Russell won the NBA championship with the New York Knicks 1970. He later was named to the All-Star Game in 1972. Lou Hudson, the 4th pick, and Archie Clark, the 37th pick, have also been selected to both All-NBA Team and All-Star Game. Hudson was selected to six All-Star Games and one All-NBA Team while Clark was selected to two All-Star Games and one All-NBA Team. Three other players from this draft, 3rd pick Clyde Lee, 5th pick Jack Marin and 27th pick John Block, have also been selected to at least one All-Star Game. Matt Guokas, the 9th pick, won the NBA championship with the Philadelphia 76ers in his rookie season. He and his father, Matt Guokas, Sr., became the first father and son duo to win the NBA championships. Matt Guokas, Sr. won the inaugural championship with the Philadelphia Warriors in 1947. The younger Guokas became a head coach after ending his playing career. He coached the 76ers for three seasons and the Orlando Magic for four seasons. John Wetzel, the 75th pick, also became a head coach; he coached the Phoenix Suns for one season.

== Key ==
Pos.	G	F	C
Position	Guard	Forward	Center

^	Denotes player who has been inducted to the Naismith Memorial Basketball Hall of Fame
*	Denotes player who has been selected for at least one All-Star Game and All-NBA Team
^{+}	Denotes player who has been selected for at least one All-Star Game
^{#}	Denotes player who has never appeared in an NBA regular-season or playoff game
^{~}	Denotes player who has been selected as Rookie of the Year

== Draft ==
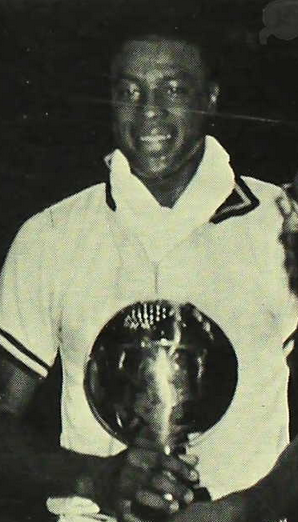
Cazzie Russell was selected first overall by the New York Knicks.

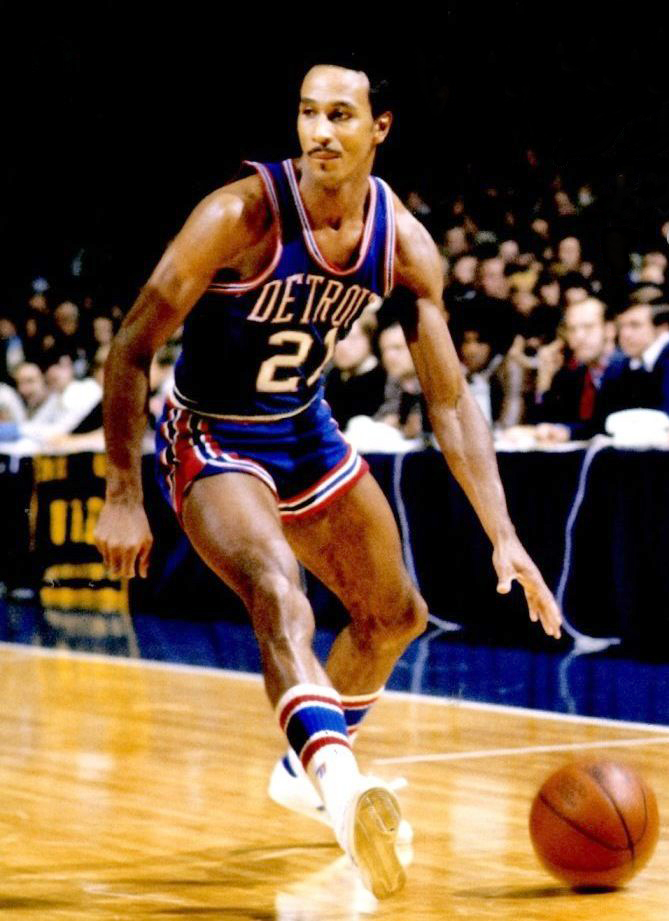
Dave Bing was selected second overall by the Detroit Pistons.

Rnd.	Pick	Player	Pos.	Nationality (Note: Nationality indicates the player's national team or representative nationality. If a player has not competed at the international level, then the nationality indicates the national team which the player is eligible to represent according to FIBA rules.)	Team	School / club team
1	1	Cazzie Russell^{+}	G/F	United States	New York Knicks	Michigan (Sr.)
1	2	Dave Bing^^{~}	G	United States	Detroit Pistons	Syracuse (Sr.)
1	3	Clyde Lee^{+}	F/C	United States	San Francisco Warriors	Vanderbilt (Sr.)
1	4	Lou Hudson^	G/F	United States	St. Louis Hawks	Minnesota (Sr.)
1	5	Jack Marin^{+}	G/F	United States	Baltimore Bullets	Duke (Sr.)
1	6	Walt Wesley	C	United States	Cincinnati Royals	Kansas (Sr.)
1	7	Jerry Chambers	F	United States	Los Angeles Lakers	Utah (Sr.)
1	8	Jim Barnett	G/F	United States	Boston Celtics	Oregon (Sr.)
1	9	Matt Guokas	G/F	United States	Philadelphia 76ers	Saint Joseph's (Sr.)
1	10	Dave Schellhase	G	United States	Chicago Bulls	Purdue (Sr.)
2	11	Henry Akin	F/C	United States	New York Knicks	Morehead State (Jr.)
2	12	Dorie Murrey	F/C	United States	Detroit Pistons	Detroit (Sr.)
2	13	Joe Ellis	G/F	United States	San Francisco Warriors	San Francisco (Sr.)
2	14	Dick Snyder	G/F	United States	St. Louis Hawks	Davidson (Sr.)
2	15	Neil Johnson	F/C	United States	Baltimore Bullets	Creighton (Sr.)
2	16	Jerry Lee Wells^{#}	G	United States	Cincinnati Royals	Oklahoma City (Sr.)
2	17	Hank Finkel	C	United States	Los Angeles Lakers	Dayton (Sr.)
2	18	Leon Clark^{#}	F	United States	Boston Celtics	Wyoming (Sr.)
2	19	Bill Melchionni	G	United States	Philadelphia 76ers	Villanova (Sr.)
2	20	Erwin Mueller	F/C	United States	Chicago Bulls	San Francisco (Sr.)
3	21	Stew Johnson^{#}	F	United States	New York Knicks	Murray State (Sr.)
3	22	Ollie Darden^{#}	F	United States	Detroit Pistons	Michigan (Sr.)
3	23	Steve Chubin^{#}	G	United States	San Francisco Warriors	Rhode Island (Sr.)
3	24	Tommy Kron	G	United States	St. Louis Hawks	Kentucky (Sr.)
3	25	Dave Wagnon^{#}	G	United States	Baltimore Bullets	Idaho State (Sr.)
3	26	Jim Ware	F	United States	Cincinnati Royals	Oklahoma City (Sr.)
3	27	John Block^{+}	F/C	United States	Los Angeles Lakers	USC (Sr.)
3	28	Gary Turner^{#}	F	United States	Boston Celtics	TCU (Sr.)
3	29	Donnie Freeman	G	United States	Philadelphia 76ers	Illinois (Sr.)
3	30	Ed Bodkin^{#}	F	United States	Chicago Bulls	Eastern Kentucky (Sr.)
4	31	Lee DeFore^{#}	F	United States	New York Knicks	Auburn (Sr.)
4	32	Jeff Congdon^{#}	G	United States	Detroit Pistons	BYU (Sr.)
4	33	Steve Vacendak^{#}	G	United States	San Francisco Warriors	Duke (Sr.)
4	34	Bob McIntyre^{#}	F	United States	St. Louis Hawks	St. John's (Sr.)
4	35	George Peeples^{#}	C	United States	Baltimore Bullets	Iowa (Sr.)
4	36	Charles Schmaus^{#}	G	United States	Cincinnati Royals	VMI (Sr.)
4	37	Archie Clark*	G	United States	Los Angeles Lakers	Minnesota (Sr.)
4	38	Johnny Austin	G	United States	Boston Celtics	Boston College (Sr.)
4	39	Ken Wilburn	F	United States	Philadelphia 76ers	Central State (Sr.)
4	40	Jim Williams^{#}	C	United States	Chicago Bulls	Temple (Sr.)
5	41	Ron Jackson^{#}	F	United States	New York Knicks	Clark (Sr.)
5	42	William Pickens^{#}	C	United States	Detroit Pistons	Georgia Southern (Sr.)
5	43	Tom Kerwin^{#}	F	United States	San Francisco Warriors	Centenary (Sr.)
5	44	Dick Nemelka^{#}	G	United States	St. Louis Hawks	BYU (Sr.)
5	45	John Beasley^{#}	F/C	United States	Baltimore Bullets	Texas A&M (Sr.)
5	46	Johnny Jones	F	United States	Baltimore Bullets	Allentown Jets (EPBL)
5	47	Rich Parks^{#}	F	United States	Cincinnati Royals	Saint Louis (Sr.)
5	48	Stan Washington^{#}	G	United States	Los Angeles Lakers	Michigan State (Sr.)
5	49	Tom Duff^{#}	F	United States	Philadelphia 76ers	Saint Joseph's (Sr.)
5	50	Larry Humes^{#}	G	United States	Chicago Bulls	Evansville (Sr.)
6	51	George Fisher^{#}	F	United States	New York Knicks	Utah (Sr.)
6	52	Carroll Hooser^{#}	F	United States	Detroit Pistons	SMU (Sr.)
6	53	Jim Pitts^{#}	F	United States	San Francisco Warriors	Northwestern (Sr.)
6	54	Lonnie Wright^{#}	G	United States	St. Louis Hawks	Colorado State (Sr.)
6	55	Jeff Neuman^{#}	G	United States	Baltimore Bullets	Penn (Sr.)
6	56	Steve Cunningham^{#}	F	United States	Cincinnati Royals	Western Kentucky (Sr.)
6	57	Keith Thomas^{#}	G	United States	Los Angeles Lakers	Vanderbilt (Sr.)
6	58	Charlie Hunter^{#}	G	United States	Boston Celtics	Oklahoma City (Sr.)
6	59	Red Robbins^{#}	C/F	United States	Philadelphia 76ers	Tennessee (Sr.)
7	60	Mike Dabich^{#}	C	United States	New York Knicks	New Mexico State (Sr.)
7	61	Ted Manning^{#}	F	United States	Detroit Pistons	North Carolina Central (Sr.)
7	62	Lon Hughey^{#}	F	United States	San Francisco Warriors	Fresno State (Sr.)
7	63	Jay Neary^{#}	G	United States	St. Louis Hawks	UNC Wilmington (Sr.)
7	64	Dave Mills^{#}	F	United States	Baltimore Bullets	DePaul (Sr.)
7	65	Gary Schull^{#}	F	United States	Cincinnati Royals	Florida State (Sr.)
7	66	Taft Jackson^{#}	F	United States	Los Angeles Lakers	College of Idaho (Sr.)
7	67	Gary Ward^{#}	F	United States	Boston Celtics	Maryland (Sr.)
7	68	John Comeaux^{#}	F	United States	Chicago Bulls	Grambling (Sr.)
8	69	Mike Silliman	F	United States	New York Knicks	Army (Sr.)
8	70	George McNeil^{#}	G	United States	Detroit Pistons	Southern Illinois (Sr.)
8	71	Kenny Washington^{#}	G	United States	San Francisco Warriors	UCLA (Sr.)
8	72	Bryan Williams^{#}	F	United States	St. Louis Hawks	Xavier (Sr.)
8	73	Roland West	G	United States	Baltimore Bullets	Cincinnati (Jr.)
8	74	Ron Krick^{#}	F	United States	Cincinnati Royals	Cincinnati (Sr.)
8	75	John Wetzel	G/F	United States	Los Angeles Lakers	Virginia Tech (Sr.)
8	76	Russ Gumina^{#}	G	United States	Boston Celtics	San Francisco (Sr.)
8	77	Stan Curtis^{#}	G	United States	Chicago Bulls	Michigan State (Sr.)
9	78	Bill Turner	F	United States	New York Knicks	Akron (Jr.)
9	79	Al Grant^{#}	F	United States	St. Louis Hawks	Long Island (Sr.)
9	80	Chuck Gardner^{#}	F	United States	Baltimore Bullets	Colorado (Sr.)
9	81	Billy Smith^{#}	F	United States	Cincinnati Royals	Loyola Chicago (Sr.)
9	82	Julian Hammond^{#}	F	United States	Los Angeles Lakers	Tulsa (Sr.)
9	83	Pat Caldwell^{#}	F	United States	Philadelphia 76ers	Rockhurst (Sr.)
9	84	Gene Summers^{#}	F	United States	Chicago Bulls	Northern Michigan (Sr.)
10	85	Richie Moore^{#}	G	United States	New York Knicks	Hiram Scott (Sr.)
10	86	Don Yates^{#}	G	United States	St. Louis Hawks	Minnesota (Sr.)
10	87	Guy Manning^{#}	F	United States	Baltimore Bullets	Prairie View A&M (Sr.)
10	88	Freddie Lewis	G	United States	Cincinnati Royals	Arizona State (Sr.)
10	89	Mike Rooney^{#}	G	United States	Los Angeles Lakers	Oklahoma (Sr.)
10	90	Bob Bedell^{#}	F	United States	Philadelphia 76ers	Stanford (Sr.)
10	91	Don Swanson^{#}	G	United States	Chicago Bulls	DePaul (Sr.)
11	92	Rich Dyer^{#}	G	United States	New York Knicks	NYU (Sr.)
11	93	Curt Gammell^{#}	F	United States	St. Louis Hawks	Pacific Lutheran (Sr.)
11	94	Stan McKenzie	G/F	United States	Baltimore Bullets	NYU (Sr.)
11	95	R. B. Lynam^{#}	G	United States	Cincinnati Royals	Oklahoma Baptist (Sr.)
11	96	George Grams^{#}	C	United States	Los Angeles Lakers	Purdue (Sr.)
11	97	Carver Clinton^{#}	G	United States	Chicago Bulls	Penn State (Sr.)
12	98	Dave Deutsch	G	United States	New York Knicks	Rochester (Sr.)
12	99	Lonnie Lynn^{#}	F	United States	St. Louis Hawks	Wilberforce (Sr.)
12	100	Grant Simmons^{#}	G	United States	Baltimore Bullets	Nebraska (Sr.)
13	101	Bob Bennett^{#}	F	United States	New York Knicks	North Carolina (Sr.)
13	102	Nick Aloi^{#}	G	United States	St. Louis Hawks	Bowling Green (Sr.)
13	103	Al Lopes^{#}	F	United States	Baltimore Bullets	Kansas (Sr.)
14	104	Ollie Carter^{#}	G	United States	St. Louis Hawks	San Fernando Valley State (Sr.)
14	105	Jim Harter^{#}	F	United States	Baltimore Bullets	Pan American (Sr.)
15	106	Paul Long	G	United States	St. Louis Hawks	Wake Forest (Sr.)
15	107	Howard Bayne^{#}	F	United States	Baltimore Bullets	Tennessee (Sr.)
16	108	Eddie Jackson^{#}	F	United States	St. Louis Hawks	Bradley (Sr.)
16	109	Ken Barnes^{#}	G	United States	Baltimore Bullets	Wisconsin (Sr.)
17	110	Chris Pervall^{#}	G	United States	Baltimore Bullets	Iowa (Sr.)
18	111	Jerry Trice^{#}	G	United States	Baltimore Bullets	Weber State (Sr.)
19	112	Gene Visscher^{#}	F	United States	Baltimore Bullets	Weber State (Sr.)

== Notable undrafted players ==
These players were not selected in the 1966 draft but played at least one game in the NBA.

Player	Pos.	Nationality	School/club team
Bud Acton	F	United States	Hillsdale (Sr.)
Bill Dinwiddie	F	United States	New Mexico Highlands (Sr.)
Dennis Hamilton	F	United States	Arizona State (Sr.)
Bob Hogsett	F	United States	Tennessee (Sr.)

== See also ==
- List of first overall NBA draft picks
