= Mike Dabich =

American basketball player

Personal information
- Born: December 27, 1942 (age 83) Lander, Wyoming, U.S.
- Listed height: 7 ft 0 in (2.13 m)
- Listed weight: 242 lb (110 kg)

Career information
- High school: Lander (Lander, Wyoming)
- College: Sheridan College (1962–1964); New Mexico State (1964–1966)
- NBA draft: 1966: 7th round, 60th overall pick
- Drafted by: New York Knicks
- Position: Center
- Number: 55

Career history
- 1966–1967: Akron Goodyear Wingfoots
- 1967: Oakland Oaks
- 1968: Dallas Chaparrals
- Stats at Basketball Reference

Michael Lee Dabich (born December 27, 1942) is an American former professional basketball center who played one season in the American Basketball Association (ABA) with the Oakland Oaks and the Dallas Chaparrals during the 1967–68 season. He played college basketball for New Mexico State University. He was drafted during the seventh round of the 1966 NBA draft by the New York Knicks, but did not play for them.
