= Ken Wilburn =

American basketball player (1944–2016)

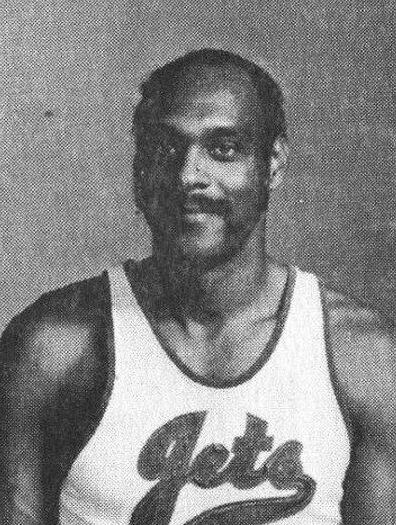
- Wilburn with the Allentown Jets in 1973

Personal information
- Born: June 8, 1944 River Rouge, Michigan, U.S.
- Died: October 6, 2016 (aged 72) Ecorse, Michigan, U.S.
- Listed height: 6 ft 6 in (1.98 m)
- Listed weight: 195 lb (88 kg)

Career information
- High school: River Rouge (River Rouge, Michigan)
- College: Central State (1962–1966)
- NBA draft: 1966: 4th round, 39th overall pick
- Drafted by: Philadelphia 76ers
- Playing career: 1966–1981
- Position: Small forward
- Number: 6, 9, 10, 30, 12

Career history

Playing
- 1966–1968: Trenton Colonials
- 1967–1968: Chicago Bulls
- 1968: New York Nets
- 1968–1969: Denver Rockets
- 1969: Minnesota Pipers
- 1969–1975: Allentown Jets
- 1978–1979: Lancaster Red Roses
- 1980–1981: Atlantic City Hi-Rollers

Coaching
- 1972–1973: Allentown Jets

Career highlights
- 3× EPBL/EBA champion (1970, 1972, 1975); 2× EPBL/EBA Most Valuable Player (1968, 1974); 4× All-EPBL/EBA First Team (1968, 1970, 1972, 1974); All-EBA Second Team (1973); EPBL Rookie of the Year (1967); NAIA tournament MVP (1965)

Career NBA and ABA statistics
- Points: 208 (3.9 ppg)
- Rebounds: 212 (3.9 ppg)
- Assists: 29 (0.5 apg)
- Stats at NBA.com
- Stats at Basketball Reference

Kenneth Eugene Wilburn (June 8, 1944 – October 6, 2016) was an American professional basketball player. He played college basketball for the Central State Marauders from 1962 to 1966 and set a career scoring record. He led the team to an National Association of Intercollegiate Athletics (NAIA) championship in 1965. Wilburn played professionally in the National Basketball Association (NBA), American Basketball Association (ABA), and the Eastern Professional Basketball League (EPBL)/Eastern Basketball Association (EBA). Wilburn was a three-time EPBL/EBA champion with the Allentown Jets. He won the EPBL Most Valuable Player award in 1968 with the Trenton Colonials and the EBA Most Valuable Player award with the Allentown Jets in 1974. Wilburn served as head coach of the Jets during the 1972–73 season.

Wilburn joined the NBA's Chicago Bulls in November 1967 to provide reinforcement after the team had lost several players to injuries. He returned to the team for the 1968–69 season, but was waived in November 1968.

Wilburn became a school teacher after his retirement from playing and taught at Chelsea Heights Elementary School in Atlantic City, New Jersey. He was indicted on December 21, 1996, on charges that he sexually assaulted six students on school field trips and in his home between September 1990 and June 1995.

== Career statistics ==
Legend
GP	Games played	GS	Games started	MPG	Minutes per game
FG%	Field goal percentage	3P%	3-point field goal percentage	FT%	Free throw percentage
RPG	Rebounds per game	APG	Assists per game	SPG	Steals per game
BPG	Blocks per game	PPG	Points per game	**Bold**	Career high

=== NBA/ABA ===
==== Regular season ====
Year	Team	GP	MPG	FG%	3P%	FT%	RPG	APG	PPG
1967–68	Chicago	3	8.7	**.556**		.250	3.3	**.7**	3.7
1968–69	Chicago	4	3.5	.375		.250	.8	.3	1.8
1968–69	N.Y. Nets (ABA)	4	5.5	.250	–	**.667**	1.0	.5	2.5
1968–69	Denver (ABA)	**37**	**11.1**	.298	–	.526	**4.8**	.6	**4.7**
1968–69	Minnesota (ABA)	6	5.7	.222	–	.400	3.0	.3	1.0
Career (NBA)		7	5.7	.471		.250	1.9	.4	2.6
Career (ABA)		47	9.9	.384	–	.535	4.2	.6	4.0
Career (overall)		54	9.4	.391	–	.506	3.9	.5	3.9

==== Playoffs ====
Year	Team	GP	MPG	FG%	3P%	FT%	RPG	APG	PPG
1969	Denver (ABA)	7	13.3	.485	–	.250	4.6	.7	5.1
