= Tom Bowens =

American basketball player (born 1940)

Personal information
- Born: July 7, 1940 (age 86) Okolona, Mississippi
- Listed height: 6 ft 8 in (2.03 m)
- Listed weight: 220 lb (100 kg)

Career information
- High school: Fannie Carter (Okolona, Mississippi)
- College: Grambling State
- Playing career: 1967–1974
- Position: Power forward / center
- Number: 50, 32, 14

Career history
- 1967–1968: Denver Rockets
- 1968–1969: New York Nets
- 1969–1970: New Orleans Buccaneers
- 1973–1974: Hazleton Bullets

Career ABA statistics
- Points: 1,132
- Rebounds: 1,007
- Assists: 134
- Stats at Basketball Reference

Tommie Lee Bowens Jr. (born July 7, 1940) is a retired American basketball player. A 6-foot-8-inch (2.03 m) and 220 pounds (100 kg) forward/center from Okolona, Mississippi, he played collegiately for the Grambling State University Tigers.

He played for the Denver Rockets (1967–68), New York Nets (1968–69) and New Orleans Buccaneers (1969–70) in the ABA for 211 games.

== Career statistics ==
Legend
GP	Games played	GS	Games started	MPG	Minutes per game
FG%	Field goal percentage	3P%	3-point field goal percentage	FT%	Free throw percentage
RPG	Rebounds per game	APG	Assists per game	SPG	Steals per game
BPG	Blocks per game	PPG	Points per game	**Bold**	Career high

=== ABA ===
==== Regular season ====
Year	Team	GP	MPG	FG%	3P%	FT%	RPG	APG	PPG
1967–68	Denver	67	19.2	.391	**.500**	.611	5.6	.6	**6.1**
1968–69	New York	**76**	**20.4**	.411	.000	.648	**6.0**	**.7**	6.0
1969–70	New Orleans	68	11.1	**.438**	–	**.758**	2.6	.6	3.9
Career		211	17.0	.409	.200	.661	4.8	.6	5.4

==== Playoffs ====
Year	Team	GP	MPG	FG%	3P%	FT%	RPG	APG	PPG
1968	Denver	5	18.8	.452	.000	1.000	5.0	1.0	6.0
