= Gerry Lee =

Gerry Lee was an animal impersonator.

He appeared as a castaway on the BBC Radio programme Desert Island Discs on 19 January 1963.
