= Jerry Lee Wells =

American basketball player

Personal information
- Born: January 18, 1944 Glasgow, Kentucky, U.S.
- Died: May 26, 2014 (aged 70) Glasgow, Kentucky, U.S.
- Listed height: 6 ft 1 in (1.85 m)

Career information
- High school: Ralph Bunche (Glasgow, Kentucky)
- College: Oklahoma City (1963–1966)
- NBA draft: 1966: 2nd round, 16th overall pick
- Drafted by: Cincinnati Royals
- Position: Guard

Career history
- 1966–1967: Muskegon Panthers
- Stats at Basketball Reference

Jerry Lee Wells (January 18, 1944 – May 26, 2014) was an American professional basketball player. He played at Ralph Bunche High School in his hometown of Glasgow, Kentucky, and committed to play for the Oklahoma City Chiefs alongside high school teammate Charlie Hunter as the first two African-Americans to play for the Chiefs basketball team. Wells' scoring ability helped take the Stars to three consecutive NCAA tournament appearances. He led the Chiefs in scoring during his junior and senior seasons. Chiefs head coach Abe Lemons stated that, "for his size, [Wells was] as good as a player I've had in 10 years at OCU" and "an All-American if there ever was one".

Wells was selected by the Cincinnati Royals as the 16th overall pick in the 1966 NBA draft but he never played in the National Basketball Association (NBA). He was drafted into the U.S. Army in 1966. Wells played for the Muskegon Panthers of the North American Basketball League (NABL) from 1966 until the team folded five games into the 1967–68 season.

Wells was inducted into the Oklahoma City Stars Hall of Fame in 1986.
