= Richie Moore =

American professional basketball player (born 1945)

Personal information
- Born: 1945 (age 80–81) Philadelphia, Pennsylvania, U.S.
- Listed height: 6 ft 4 in (1.93 m)
- Listed weight: 190 lb (86 kg)

Career information
- High school: Bartram (Philadelphia, Pennsylvania)
- College: Villanova (1963–1964); Hiram Scott (1965–1967)
- NBA draft: 1967: 3rd round, 29th overall pick
- Drafted by: San Diego Rockets
- Position: Shooting guard
- Number: 30

Career history
- 1967: Denver Rockets
- Stats at Basketball Reference

Richard L. Moore (born 1945) is an American former professional basketball player.

A 6'4" guard, he played college basketball for one season at Villanova before becoming academically ineligible and transferring to Hiram Scott College for his final two years. During his senior season he averaged 38.8 points per game. Following his college career, he worked out several times with the Philadelphia 76ers before signing with the San Diego Rockets in May 1967. After being released by San Diego in the fall, he signed with the Denver Rockets of the American Basketball Association. He played for Denver during the 1967–68 season, where he averaged 3.8 and 1.1 rebounds points per game before being released in December 1967.

Moore has the distinction of being drafted by three different NBA teams in three consecutive years:

- 1965 – 5th round (5th pick, 43rd overall) by the Philadelphia 76ers
- 1966 – 10th round (1st pick, 85th overall) by the New York Knicks
- 1967 – 3rd round (10th pick, 29th overall) by the San Diego Rockets

He was also drafted by the Oakland Oaks in the inaugural 1967 American Basketball Association draft.

== Career statistics ==
Legend
GP	Games played	GS	Games started	MPG	Minutes per game
FG%	Field goal percentage	3P%	3-point field goal percentage	FT%	Free throw percentage
RPG	Rebounds per game	APG	Assists per game	SPG	Steals per game
BPG	Blocks per game	PPG	Points per game	**Bold**	Career high

=== ABA ===
==== Regular season ====
Year	Team	GP	MPG	FG%	3P%	FT%	RPG	APG	PPG
1967–68	Denver	18	11.7	.338	.000	.750	1.1	.4	3.8
