= Grant Simmons (basketball) =

American basketball player

Personal information
- Born: March 7, 1943 (age 83) New Orleans, Louisiana, U.S.
- Listed height: 6 ft 3 in (1.91 m)
- Listed weight: 190 lb (86 kg)

Career information
- High school: Benson (Omaha, Nebraska)
- College: Nebraska (1963–1966)
- NBA draft: 1966: 12th round, 100th overall pick
- Drafted by: Baltimore Bullets
- Position: Point guard
- Number: 10

Career history
- 1967–1969: Denver Rockets

Career highlights
- First-team All-Big Eight (1966)
- Stats at Basketball Reference

Grant M. Simmons (born March 7, 1943) is an American former professional basketball player.

== Early life ==
Benson attended Benson High School in Omaha, Nebraska, where he was named to the Omaha World-Herald All-Intercity team in both basketball and football as a senior.

== College career ==
After ininitally attending Tulsa, he switched after two weeks to the University of Nebraska in September 1962. where he played college basketball for the Nebraska Cornhuskers. As a senior in 1965–66 he was named to the Big Eight Conference's First Team.

== Professional career ==
Simmons was drafted by the Baltimore Bullets in the 12th round of the 1966 NBA draft but turned down their contract offer to work towards his Master's Degree at Nebraska while also joining the coaching staff at Lincoln High School. He later played in the American Basketball Association for the Denver Nuggets during the 1967–68 and 1968–69 seasons.

== Career statistics ==
Legend
GP	Games played	GS	Games started	MPG	Minutes per game
FG%	Field goal percentage	3P%	3-point field goal percentage	FT%	Free throw percentage
RPG	Rebounds per game	APG	Assists per game	SPG	Steals per game
BPG	Blocks per game	PPG	Points per game	**Bold**	Career high

=== ABA ===
==== Regular season ====
Year	Team	GP	MPG	FG%	3P%	FT%	RPG	APG	PPG
1967–68	Denver	**78**	**29.0**	**.424**	.045	**.705**	**3.1**	**2.3**	**10.2**
1968–69	Denver	17	14.8	.373	**.500**	.690	1.5	.9	3.8
Career		95	26.5	.420	.083	.704	2.8	2.1	9.0

==== Playoffs ====
Year	Team	GP	MPG	FG%	3P%	FT%	RPG	APG	PPG
1968	Denver	**5**	**29.0**	**.361**	.000	**.750**	**4.4**	**3.0**	**7.6**
1969	Denver	2	4.5	.000	–	–	.0	.0	.0
Career		7	22.0	.351	.000	.750	3.1	2.1	5.4
