= Ron Horn =

American basketball player (1938–2002)

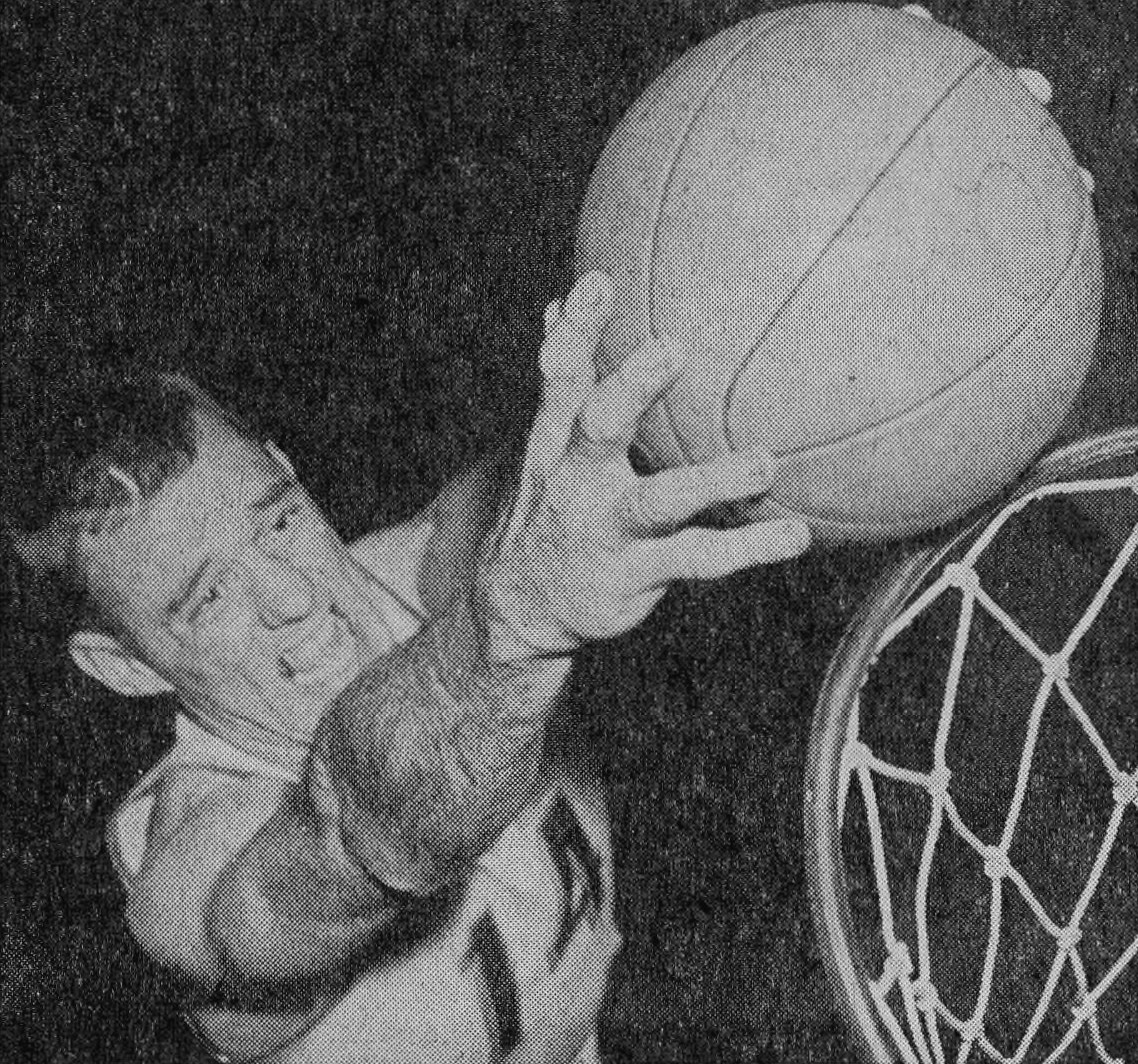
- Horn, circa 1960

Personal information
- Born: May 24, 1938 Marion, Indiana, U.S.
- Died: October 5, 2002 (aged 64)
- Listed height: 6 ft 7 in (2.01 m)
- Listed weight: 220 lb (100 kg)

Career information
- High school: Mississinewa (Gas City, Indiana)
- College: Indiana (1957–1959)
- NBA draft: 1961: 2nd round, 16th overall pick
- Drafted by: St. Louis Hawks
- Playing career: 1961–1971
- Position: Small forward
- Number: 12, 24, 30

Career history
- 1961–1962: St. Louis Hawks
- 1962–1963: Los Angeles Lakers
- 1963–1964: Trenton Colonials
- 1967–1968: Denver Rockets
- 1970–1971: Binghamton Flyers / Trenton Pat Pavers
- Stats at NBA.com
- Stats at Basketball Reference

Ronnie Leroy Horn (May 24, 1938 – October 5, 2002) was an American professional basketball player who played in the NBA and ABA. Ron was drafted with the seventh pick in the second round of the 1961 NBA draft by the St. Louis Hawks. After playing one season with the Hawks, Ron played with the Los Angeles Lakers for a season. He played with the Trenton Colonials in the Eastern Professional Basketball League (EPBL) during the 1963–64 season. Horn also played in 1967–68 for the Denver Rockets of the ABA. He played three games for the Binghamton Flyers / Trenton Pat Pavers in the Eastern Basketball Association during the 1970–71 season.

Horn played college basketball for Indiana University, spending one season (1958–59) on the varsity squad with future NBA star Walt Bellamy and collegiate coach Bob Reinhart. Following his sophomore season, Horn entered the U.S. Military and spent two years (1959–60, 1960–61) playing AAU Men's Basketball on the U.S. Armed Forces team.

Horn played scholastically for the Mississinewa High School Indians; leading them to an IHSAA Sectional and Regional titles in 1954. To date, the 1953–54 season remains the deepest IHSAA-tournament run for the Indians.

== Career statistics ==
Legend
GP	Games played	GS	Games started	MPG	Minutes per game
FG%	Field goal percentage	3P%	3-point field goal percentage	FT%	Free throw percentage
RPG	Rebounds per game	APG	Assists per game	SPG	Steals per game
BPG	Blocks per game	PPG	Points per game	**Bold**	Career high

=== NBA/ABA ===
==== Regular season ====
Year	Team	GP	MPG	FG%	3P%	FT%	RPG	APG	PPG
1961–62	St. Louis	3	8.3	.083		.500	2.0	.3	1.0
1962–63	L.A. Lakers	**28**	**10.3**	**.329**		.690	**2.5**	**.4**	**2.6**
1967–68	Denver (ABA)	1	6.0	.000	–	**1.000**	1.0	.0	2.0
Career (NBA)		31	10.1	.298		.677	2.5	.4	2.5
Career (overall)		32	10.0	.292	–	.697	2.4	.3	2.5

==== Playoffs ====
Year	Team	GP	MPG	FG%	FT%	RPG	APG	PPG
1962	L.A. Lakers	7	7.9	.333	.800	1.6	.3	1.7
