= John Comeaux =

American basketball player

Personal information
- Born: September 15, 1943 (age 82) Lafayette, Louisiana, U.S.
- Listed height: 6 ft 5 in (1.96 m)
- Listed weight: 193 lb (88 kg)

Career information
- High school: Mossville (Lake, Louisiana)
- College: Grambling State (1962–1966)
- NBA draft: 1966: 7th round, 68th overall pick
- Drafted by: Chicago Bulls
- Position: Forward
- Number: 23

Career history
- 1967–1968: New Orleans Buccaneers
- Stats at Basketball Reference

John Roosevelt Comeaux (September 15, 1943 in Lafayette, Louisiana) is an American former professional basketball player who spent one season in the American Basketball Association (ABA) as a member of the New Orleans Buccaneers during the 1967–68 season. He attended Grambling State University where he was selected during the seventh round of the 1966 NBA draft by the Chicago Bulls, but he did not sign.
