= Chuck Gardner =

American basketball player

Personal information
- Born: September 30, 1944 (age 82) Lincoln, Nebraska, U.S.
- Listed height: 6 ft 8 in (2.03 m)
- Listed weight: 205 lb (93 kg)

Career information
- High school: Pennsbury (Fairless Hills, Pennsylvania)
- College: Colorado (1963–1966)
- NBA draft: 1966: 9th round, 80th overall pick
- Drafted by: Baltimore Bullets
- Position: Power forward
- Number: 12

Career history
- 1967–1968: Denver Rockets
- Stats at Basketball Reference

Charles Rutland Gardner (born September 30, 1944) is an American former professional basketball power forward who played one season in the American Basketball Association (ABA) as a member of the Denver Rockets during the 1967–68 season. Born in Lincoln, Nebraska, he attended the University of Colorado where he was drafted in the ninth round of the 1966 NBA draft by the Baltimore Bullets.
