= R. B. Lynam =

American basketball player (born 1944)

Personal information
- Born: December 22, 1944 (age 81) U.S.
- Listed height: 6 ft 1 in (1.85 m)
- Listed weight: 190 lb (86 kg)

Career information
- High school: Shawnee (Shawnee, Oklahoma)
- College: Oklahoma Baptist (1962–1966)
- NBA draft: 1966: 11th round, 95th overall pick
- Drafted by: Cincinnati Royals
- Position: Guard
- Number: 30

Career history
- 1967: Denver Rockets

Career highlights
- Second-team All-OCC (1965)
- Stats at Basketball Reference

Robert Bracey Lynam (born December 22, 1944) is a retired professional basketball guard who played one season in the American Basketball Association (ABA) as a member of the Denver Rockets during the 1967–68 season. He attended Oklahoma Baptist University where he was selected by the Cincinnati Royals in the 11^{th} round of the 1966 NBA draft. He never signed with the Royals.

== Career statistics ==
Legend
GP	Games played	GS	Games started	MPG	Minutes per game
FG%	Field goal percentage	3P%	3-point field goal percentage	FT%	Free throw percentage
RPG	Rebounds per game	APG	Assists per game	SPG	Steals per game
BPG	Blocks per game	PPG	Points per game	**Bold**	Career high

=== ABA ===
==== Regular season ====
Year	Team	GP	MPG	FG%	3P%	FT%	RPG	APG	PPG
1967–68	Denver	7	5.6	.294	.000	.875	.7	.0	2.4
