= John Morrison (basketball) =

American basketball player and coach (born 1945)

Personal information
- Born: May 2, 1945 (age 81)
- Listed height: 6 ft 2 in (1.88 m)
- Listed weight: 190 lb (86 kg)

Career information
- High school: Seton Hall Prep (West Orange, New Jersey)
- College: Canisius (1963–1967)
- NBA draft: 1967: 6th round, 61st overall pick
- Drafted by: St. Louis Hawks
- Position: Guard
- Number: 14
- Coaching career: 1971–1976

Career history

Playing
- 1967: Denver Rockets

Coaching
- 1971–1972: Canisius (assistant)
- 1972–1974: Canisius
- 1974–1976: Spirits of St. Louis (assistant)
- Stats at Basketball Reference

John Russell Morrison (born May 2, 1945) is an American former professional basketball player. He played in the American Basketball Association for the Denver Rockets at the beginning of the 1967–68 season.

Raised in Roselle Park, New Jersey, Morrison decided to attend Seton Hall Preparatory School in West Orange, New Jersey, rather than the newly opened Roselle Catholic High School.

After the NBA, Morrison became a head coach for Canisius College (1972–74) and an assistant for the ABA's Spirits of St. Louis (1974–76).
