= Willie Rogers (basketball) =

American basketball player

Personal information
- Born: November 11, 1945 (age 81) Nacogdoches, Texas, U.S.
- Listed height: 6 ft 3 in (1.91 m)
- Listed weight: 185 lb (84 kg)

Career information
- High school: James Madison (Dallas, Texas)
- College: Oklahoma (1965–1968)
- NBA draft: 1968: 8th round, 94th overall pick
- Drafted by: Seattle SuperSonics
- Position: Shooting guard
- Number: 44

Career history
- 1968–1969: Denver Rockets
- Stats at Basketball Reference

Willie Daniel Rogers (born September 11, 1945) is an American former professional basketball player who was selected by the Seattle SuperSonics in the 8th round (94th pick overall) of the 1968 NBA draft.

A 6'3" guard from the University of Oklahoma, Rogers played one season in the American Basketball Association (ABA). That year, he played in 40 games and scored 85 points. While at Oklahoma, Rogers scored 1,153 points to become the fourth leading scorer at the time. He remains among only 33 Sooners to have scored over 1,000 points at the university. Rogers was also the third-leading rebounder.
