= Larry Jones (basketball) =

American basketball player (1941–2025)

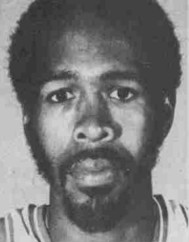
- Jones, c. 1973

Personal information
- Born: September 22, 1941 Columbus, Ohio, U.S.
- Died: August 16, 2025 (aged 83)
- Listed height: 6 ft 2 in (1.88 m)
- Listed weight: 180 lb (82 kg)

Career information
- High school: East (Columbus, Ohio)
- College: Toledo (1960–1964)
- NBA draft: 1964: 3rd round, 20th overall pick
- Drafted by: Philadelphia 76ers
- Playing career: 1964–1976
- Position: Point guard / shooting guard
- Number: 12, 32, 23, 22
- Coaching career: 1976–1984

Career history

Playing
- 1964–1965: Philadelphia 76ers
- 1965: →Wilkes-Barre Barons
- 1965–1967: Wilkes-Barre Barons
- 1967–1970: Denver Rockets
- 1970–1972: Floridians
- 1972: Utah Stars
- 1972–1973: Dallas Chaparrals
- 1973–1974: Philadelphia 76ers
- 1975: Munich Eagles
- 1975–1976: Wilkes-Barre Barons

Coaching
- 1976–1978: Detroit Pistons (assistant)
- 1978–1979: Las Vegas Dealers
- 1982–1983: Franklin (Ohio)
- 1984: Columbus Minks

Career highlights
- 4× ABA All-Star (1968–1971); 3× All-ABA First Team (1968–1970); All-EPBL Second Team (1966); First-team All-MAC (1962); Second-team All-MAC (1961)

Career NBA and ABA statistics
- Points: 10,505 (19.1 ppg)
- Rebounds: 2,725 (4.9 rpg)
- Assists: 2,030 (3.7 apg)
- Stats at NBA.com
- Stats at Basketball Reference

Larry Richard Jones (September 22, 1941 – August 16, 2025) was an American professional basketball player. He most notably played in the American Basketball Association (ABA), where he was the first player to reach 5,000 career points. He also had shorter stints in the rival National Basketball Association (NBA).

== Early life and college career ==
Jones was born on September 22, 1941, as the only child of parents Richard and Helen Jones. He attended East High School in Columbus, Ohio, where he played basketball. Jones only started playing regularly in high school during his senior year. As a 6 ft 2 in (1.88 m) forward he was not considered big enough by major colleges and was recruited by the University of Toledo for whom he played in the Mid-American Conference (MAC) from 1960. (Note: Freshmen were ineligible until 1972) He was repositioned as a guard by Toledo coach Ed Melvin and became a major player for the Rockets.

Jones was a unanimous selection in the 1962 All-MAC First Team chosen by the conference's coaches, having made the Second Team a year earlier. He injured his wrist in Toledo's season opener against Butler on December 1, 1962, after a heavy fall where he also hit his head. Jones, who scored 35 points in the game, managed to play the last five minutes of the game with what was thought to be a sprained wrist. It later emerged the wrist was fractured and he had to redshirt the rest of the 1962–63 season. His eligibility was then extended for another season.

One year later, in December 1963, he helped Toledo score a "monumental upset" over New York University (at the time ranked second nationally). His coach Melvin described him as a "tremendous total player – rebounder, playmaker, scorer and defender" for his form that season after he averaged over 27 points the four previous games. Jones, the Toledo captain and all-time second highest scorer, suffered a fractured knuckle on January 13, 1964, when he fell on ice after a practice. Before he could return from injury, he was suspended in early February for undisclosed disciplinary reasons. It later emerged that he had been involved in a paternity suit. However all charges were dropped, his name was cleared and he was reinstated in early March, allowing him to play the final two games of the season. He was an honorable mention All-American in the 1964 Newspaper Enterprise Association selection.

== Professional career ==
=== Early career (1964–1967) ===
Jones was first drafted by the NBA's Los Angeles Lakers with a fifth round pick (43rd overall) in the 1963 NBA draft, however he played another college season instead of turning professional.(see College career). He then re-entered the 1964 NBA draft where he was chosen in the third round (20th overall pick) by the Philadelphia 76ers. During the 1964–65 season he was sent by the Sixers to the Wilkes-Barre Barons of the Eastern Professional Basketball League (EPBL) where he averaged 20 points per game. He was recalled to Philadelphia on March 2, 1965, due to injuries to backcourt players. At the end of an NBA season where he had averaged 5.7 points in 23 games, Jones was released.

Following his release, Jones played from 1965 to 1967 in the EPBL, again with Wilkes-Barre. He was selected to the All-EPBL Second Team in 1966. He was part of the Baltimore Bullets pre-season squad but was released in October 1966 and returned to the Barons.

=== Denver Rockets (1967–1970) ===
When the American Basketball Association was created in 1967, Jones called and wrote to every team in the league, the Denver Rockets were the only one to answer. He signed a $10,000 contract with the Rockets, the Eastern League disputed it and he had to stay in the team plane during his first game in Pittsburgh to avoid a subpoena.

Thanks to his excellent jump-shooting, Jones became a major player for Denver and the ABA in general, making three consecutive All-ABA First Teams from 1967 to 1970. He scored 30 points or more in 23 consecutive games during the 1968–69 ABA season. This included 52 points in a 133–123 win over the Houston Mavericks on March 21, 1969, which equaled his own club record. During this match he became the first ABA player to score over 2,000 points in a season. He finished the regular season with a league-leading 2,133 points as Denver lost in the playoffs first round to the Oakland Oaks.

Jones reached 5,000 career ABA points on January 15, 1970, becoming the first player in the league to do so. He scored 23 points against the Dallas Chaparrals to reach the mark, including two free-throws at the end of the game to secure the win for Denver. During the 1969–70 season he averaged 24.9 points in the regular season and 26.6 during the playoffs as the Rockets lost in the West finals. He was the top scorer of the 1970 ABA All-Star Game with 30 points, adding 6 rebounds and 5 assists. As the ABA Players' Association (ABAPA) President, Jones and the ABAPA threatened to sit out the game if the association was not recognized by ABA owners. They eventually arrived at the Indiana State Fairgrounds Coliseum at 1:39 pm, only twenty minutes before the game start.

Despite his tally, Jones was pipped to the All-Star Game MVP award (and assorted prizes such as a one-year Dodge Challenger lease) by Denver teammate Spencer Haywood. This reflected Denver's payroll where Jones was replaced as the Rockets' highest-paid player by Haywood, a rookie, when he signed in 1969. In fact Haywood's $1.9 million contract (which included a $50,000 signing bonus) dwarfed Jones's $23,000 per year. Though Haywood left for the NBA after one season (as his contract deferred most of his salary for decades), Jones wasn't offered a revalued contract. He protested (once wearing a "railroad suit, claiming that was all he could afford") and obtained a trade to another team. Jones was traded to the Floridians in June 1970 when Denver sent him, Greg Wittman and a No. 2 draft pick to the Floridians in exchange for Don Sidle, Larry Cannon and a No. 1 draft pick. His Denver career ended with averages of 25.4 points and 4.2 assists in 226 regular-season games and 25.1 points and 5.6 assists in 20 playoff games.

=== Later ABA career (1970–1973) ===
Jones joined the Floridians as they replaced their entire squad after finishing the 1969–70 season with a 23–61 record. Jones and teammate Mack Calvin contributed a 51.5 point average during the 1970–71 season which was the highest scoring backcourt ever in professional basketball. He averaged over 20 points for the Floridians over two seasons in which they reached the playoffs. However the club struggled with attendances and the first round playoff loss to the Virginia Squires on April 6, 1972, was their final game. The ABA bought the club and folded it, organizing a dispersal draft in June where the four worst ABA teams had the first picks on Floridians and Pittsburgh Condors players. The Utah Stars selected Jones with the third pick.

Jones did not fit in at Utah, where he was the No. 4 guard as the team had many shooters and he was said to be weak on defense and team play. He left the team in December as he was exchanged for Bob Warren in a straight swap with the Dallas Chaparrals. He reached 10,000 career ABA points during a February 11, 1973, game against the San Diego Conquistadors, becoming the fourth ABA player to reach the milestone during the season. (Note: His NBA points were included in the tally) He contributed a season-best 30 points, including a layup six seconds from time that helped claim an overtime 115–113 win for the Chaparrals.

At the end of the season Jones was placed on waivers by the Chaparrals and was not claimed by another club. It was speculated that his tenure of the head of the Players' Association discouraged clubs from signing the former all-time ABA scoring leader. He claimed no ABA team even called him to make a lower salary offer.

=== NBA return and retirement (1973–1975) ===
Having considered ending his professional career to finish a doctorate in counseling, Jones was offered a lifeline by Gene Shue, coach of his former NBA team Philadelphia, who signed him for the Sixers. The Sixers had finished the previous season with a 9–73 record, the worst in the history of the NBA. Hoping to prove those who considered him "over the hill" wrong, Jones contributed double figure scoring while starting eight of ten games between November and December as the Sixers won five times to reach a 9–15 record. This included 20 points in a 108–106 overtime win over the Houston Rockets and an NBA career-best 22 in a November 20 win over the Kansas City-Omaha Kings. He finished the 1973–74 NBA season averaging 10 points per game, following which he was released by the Sixers in October 1974.

In November, he participated in the European Professional Basketball League draft with other free agents. He was signed by the Munich Eagles to both play for and coach the Germany-based club. He was one of the best players in the league, averaging 23 points (second best for the league) and a league-topping 7 assists per game when the season prematurely ended in March after 30 games.

Jones played one game for the Wilkes-Barre Barons of the renamed Eastern Basketball Association during the 1975–76 season.

== Coaching career ==
After his first coaching experience in the European Professional Basketball League, Jones was hired by another former European coach, Herb Brown, when he joined the Detroit Pistons in 1976. He served as assistant coach with the Pistons for two NBA seasons, keeping his post when Brown was fired in 1977. He was not retained for the 1978–79 season after incoming coach Dick Vitale hired other assistants such as long-time friend Richie Adubato.

Jones was then the head coach of the Las Vegas Dealers of the Western Basketball Association during its inaugural 1978–79 season following which the unstable league folded.

Jones next served as director of player personnel for the Women's Professional Basketball League until the league folded in 1981. He served as the coach at Franklin University during the 1982–83 season. His following position was in women's basketball, coaching his hometown team, the Columbus Minks, in the Women's American Basketball Association (WABA). The WABA played its only season from October to November 1984, its last game before folding was the All-Star Game on December 16 where Jones coached the All-Star team against champions Dallas Diamonds.

== Personal life and death ==
After his playing career, Jones worked as a state corrections official in Columbus. Married with two daughters and one son, he conducted free summer basketball camps for youngsters in his hometown. He credited his high school coach Jackie Moore with helping him "go from a poor student to an honor student" and wanted to follow his example in helping youths.

Additionally, Jones worked as a substitute teacher and earned a master’s degree in education from Ohio State.

In 2011, Jones was inducted into the Ohio Basketball Hall of Fame.

Jones was married to his wife, Wanda Harewood-Jones, for 38 years and had two children. He also had a stepdaughter, Twala, who died in 2014.

Jones died on August 16, 2025, at the age of 83.

== Career statistics ==
Legend
| GP | Games played | GS | Games started | MPG | Minutes per game |
| FG% | Field goal percentage | 3P% | 3-point field goal percentage | FT% | Free throw percentage |
| RPG | Rebounds per game | APG | Assists per game | SPG | Steals per game |
| BPG | Blocks per game | PPG | Points per game | **Bold** | Career high |

=== NBA/ABA ===
==== Regular season ====
| Year | Team | GP | GS | MPG | FG% | 3P% | FT% | RPG | APG | SPG | BPG | PPG |
|---|---|---|---|---|---|---|---|---|---|---|---|---|
| 1964–65 | Philadelphia | 23 | | 15.6 | .307 | | .712 | 2.5 | 1.7 | | | 5.7 |
| 1967–68 | Denver (ABA) | 76 | | 40.6 | .427 | .190 | .776 | **7.9** | 3.6 | | | 22.9 |
| 1968–69 | Denver (ABA) | 75 | | 40.6 | .465 | .240 | .778 | 6.6 | 3.4 | | | **28.4** |
| 1969–70 | Denver (ABA) | 75 | | 40.4 | .434 | .248 | .791 | 5.2 | **5.7** | | | 24.9 |
| 1970–71 | Florida (ABA) | **84** | | **43.0** | .467 | .363 | .802 | 5.4 | 4.6 | | | 24.3 |
| 1971–72 | Florida (ABA) | 66 | | 34.2 | **.531** | .300 | .804 | 4.7 | 3.2 | | | 17.6 |
| 1972–73 | Utah (ABA) | 27 | | 16.6 | .438 | **.364** | .817 | 2.3 | 1.6 | | | 6.2 |
| 1972–73 | Dallas (ABA) | 53 | | 23.7 | .468 | .261 | .832 | 3.4 | 3.1 | | | 10.0 |
| 1973–74 | Philadelphia | 72 | 60 | 26.1 | .423 | | **.838** | 2.6 | 3.2 | 1.2 | .3 | 10.0 |
| Career (NBA) | | 95 | 60 | 23.5 | .400 | | .815 | 2.5 | 2.8 | 1.2 | .3 | 9.0 |
| Career (ABA) | | 456 | | 36.7 | .459 | .277 | .791 | 5.4 | 3.9 | | | 21.2 |
| Career (overall) | | 551 | 60 | 34.4 | .453 | .277 | .793 | 4.9 | 3.7 | 1.2 | .3 | 19.1 |
| All-Star (ABA) | | 4 | 2 | 26.8 | .524 | .333 | .731 | 6.5 | 4.3 | | | 16.0 |

==== Playoffs ====
| Year | Team | GP | MPG | FG% | 3P% | FT% | RPG | APG | PPG |
|---|---|---|---|---|---|---|---|---|---|
| 1965 | Philadelphia | 5 | 5.0 | .417 | | .636 | .8 | .4 | 3.4 |
| 1968 | Denver (ABA) | 1 | 41.0 | **.600** | – | .625 | 4.0 | 4.0 | **29.0** |
| 1969 | Denver (ABA) | 7 | 40.3 | .358 | **.375** | .724 | **7.7** | 4.6 | 22.0 |
| 1970 | Denver (ABA) | **12** | **44.6** | .546 | .250 | .871 | 5.3 | **6.3** | 26.6 |
| 1971 | Florida (ABA) | 6 | 36.0 | .395 | .250 | **.917** | 4.2 | 6.2 | 17.2 |
| 1972 | Florida (ABA) | 4 | 28.8 | .342 | .000 | .824 | 3.3 | 2.3 | 10.0 |
| Career (ABA) | | 30 | 39.6 | .454 | .270 | .819 | 5.3 | 5.3 | 21.5 |
| Career (overall) | | 35 | 34.7 | .453 | .270 | .811 | 4.7 | 4.6 | 18.9 |
