= Lonnie Wright =

American basketball and football player (1945–2012)

Personal information
- Born: January 23, 1945 Newark, New Jersey, U.S.
- Died: March 23, 2012 (aged 67) South Orange, New Jersey, U.S.
- Listed height: 6 ft 2 in (1.88 m)
- Listed weight: 205 lb (93 kg)

Career information
- High school: South Side (Newark, New Jersey)
- College: Colorado State (1963–1966)
- NBA draft: 1966: 6th round, 54th overall pick
- Drafted by: St. Louis Hawks
- Position: Shooting guard / point guard
- Number: 42, 20

Career history
- 1967–1971: Denver Rockets
- 1971–1972: The Floridians
- Stats at Basketball Reference

Lonnie Wright (January 23, 1945 – March 23, 2012) was an American professional basketball and football player who played in the same season for the Denver Rockets of the American Basketball Association and the Denver Broncos of the American Football League before switching to basketball on a full-time basis.

== Education ==
Wright was born in Newark, New Jersey and attended South Side High School (since renamed Malcolm X Shabazz High School), where he earned All-City, All-County, All-State, and All-American honors in both football and basketball. He was inducted into the New Jersey State Interscholastic Athletic Association Hall of Fame in 1997.

Wright attended Colorado State University, where he played basketball and set the school's shot put record of 52 feet, 9 inches. He scored 1,246 points in his college basketball career, and was part of the Rams team that made it to the 22-team 1966 NCAA Tournament, losing in the first round to the University of Houston team led by Elvin Hayes and Don Chaney.

== Professional careers ==
Wright was drafted in the sixth round of the 1966 NBA draft by the St. Louis Hawks (now the Atlanta Hawks), but did not sign with the team. His NBA draft rights were sent from the Hawks to the Cincinnati Royals in a three-team trade that also involved the Chicago Bulls on 12 October 1969. Despite the fact Wright never played football in college, the Dallas Cowboys of the NFL also showed interest in acquiring him. He later signed with the Denver Broncos of the American Football League on April 16, 1966, playing for the team in 1966 and 1967. As a safety, he intercepted one pass in the 1966 season and four more the following year. He caught a single pass in his career, losing two yards on the reception.

Switching sports, Wright signed with the Denver Rockets (predecessor to the Denver Nuggets) on January 5, 1968, starting play with the Rockets just weeks after the end of the football season.

A 6-foot 2 inch (1.88 m), 205 pound (93 kg) guard, he played for five seasons in the American Basketball Association, four seasons with the Rockets (1967–1971) and a single season with The Floridians (1971–1972). He scored 3,590 points and averaged 10.7 points per game over his career, with the 1968–69 season marking his career bests, scoring 1,130 points and 16.4 points per game, second on the team in both statistics behind Larry Jones.

While Otto Graham and Bud Grant had done the basketball-football double in the 1940s, only Ron Widby had done it since, through 1999.

Wright was inducted into the Newark Athletic Hall of Fame in 1988 and into the Colorado State University Sports Hall of Fame the following year.

== Personal ==
Wright served as the Director of Students at the New Jersey Medical School of the University of Medicine and Dentistry of New Jersey in Newark.

Wright's wife Johanna was head coach of the girls' basketball team at Columbia High School in Maplewood, New Jersey until 2014.

A resident of South Orange, New Jersey, Wright died at the age of 67 at his home there on March 23, 2012, due to congestive heart failure.
