= Julian Hammond =

American basketball player (1943–2022)

Personal information
- Born: May 27, 1943 Chicago, Illinois, U.S.
- Died: October 8, 2022 (aged 79) Centennial, Colorado, U.S.
- Listed height: 6 ft 5 in (1.96 m)
- Listed weight: 205 lb (93 kg)

Career information
- High school: DuSable (Chicago, Illinois)
- College: Tulsa (1964–1966)
- NBA draft: 1966: 9th round, 82nd overall pick
- Drafted by: Los Angeles Lakers
- Playing career: 1967–1971
- Position: Small forward
- Number: 22

Career history
- 1967–1971: Denver Rockets
- Stats at Basketball Reference

Julian Clifton Hammond (May 27, 1943 – October 8, 2022) was an American professional basketball player. A small forward, Hammond played for the Denver Rockets of the American Basketball Association from 1967 to 1971.

== Career ==
Hammond graduated from DuSable High School in Chicago, Illinois. He played for the school's basketball team, but was a bench player throughout his four years at DuSable. A 6-foot-5-inch (1.96 m) small forward, Hammond began his college basketball career at Parsons Junior College. After two years at Parsons, he transferred to the University of Tulsa to continue his college basketball career with the Tulsa Golden Hurricane. He was among the first group of black basketball players at Tulsa. During the 1965–66 season, Hammond led the National Collegiate Athletic Association in field goal percentage by making 65.9 percent (172 for 261) of his shot attempts, missing the record of 66.0 percent.

The Los Angeles Lakers of the National Basketball Association (NBA) selected Hammond in the 1966 NBA draft. Hammond did not sign with the Lakers, instead signing with the Denver Rockets of the American Basketball Association (ABA) in September 1967 as one of the franchise's first free agent signings. After three seasons with Denver, Hammond became a free agent, and he signed a two-year contract to stay with the Rockets. The Rockets waived Hammond in December 1971. Playing with the Rockets from the 1967–68 to 1971–72 seasons, Hammond averaged 10.8 points and 6.2 rebounds per game on 51 percent shooting in 329 games played.

== Personal life ==
After retiring from the ABA, Hammond settled in Denver. He worked for Mountain Bell for 31 years. He then worked as an usher at the Pepsi Center during Denver Nuggets games for 14 years.

Hammond's son, Julian II, played college basketball for the Loyola Marymount Lions. His grandson, Julian III, plays college basketball for the Colorado Buffaloes.

Hammond died in Centennial, Colorado, on October 8, 2022, at age 79.
