= List of Denver Nuggets seasons =

This is a list of seasons completed by the Denver Nuggets of the National Basketball Association (NBA). They have played for 56 seasons, 47 in the NBA and nine in the American Basketball Association (ABA). As of the 2022–23 season, they have reached the NBA Finals and won the NBA championship once (2023).

== Seasons ==
League champions	Conference champions	Division champions	Playoff berth	Play-in berth

Season	League	Conference	Finish	Division	Finish	Wins	Losses	Win%	GB	Playoffs	Awards	Head coach
Denver Rockets
1967–68	ABA	—	—	Western	3rd	45	33	.577	3	Lost Division semifinals (Buccaneers) 3–2	—	Bob Bass
1968–69	ABA	—	—	Western	3rd	44	34	.564	16	Lost Division semifinals (Oaks) 4–3	—	Bob Bass
1969–70	ABA	—	—	Western	1st	51	33	.607	—	Won Division semifinals (Caps) 4–3; Lost Division finals (Stars) 4–1	Spencer Haywood (MVP, ROY, ASG MVP); Joe Belmont (COY)	John McLendon; Joe Belmont
1970–71	ABA	—	—	Western	4th	30	54	.357	28	(Note: Due to finishing with the same record as the San Diego Conquistadors, the two teams had to play a tiebreaker game to determine the playoff spot, one of only two ABA Tiebreaker Games ever played to determine a playoff team. On April 1 in Denver, the Chaparrals won 115–109 to clinch the spot and eliminate Denver.)	—	Joe Belmont; Stan Albeck
1971–72	ABA	—	—	Western	4th	34	50	.405	26	Lost Division semifinals (Pacers) 4–3	—	Alex Hannum
1972–73	ABA	—	—	Western	3rd	47	37	.560	8	Lost Division semifinals (Pacers) 4–1	Warren Jabali (ASG MVP)	Alex Hannum
1973–74	ABA	—	—	Western	5th	37	47	.440	14	(Note: Due to finishing with the same record as the San Diego Conquistadors, the two teams had to play a tiebreaker game to determine the playoff spot, On March 29 in Denver, the Conquistadors won 131–111 to clinch the spot and eliminate Denver.)	—	Alex Hannum
Denver Nuggets
1974–75	ABA	—	—	Western	1st	65	19	.774	—	Won Division semifinals (Stars) 4–2; Lost Division finals (Pacers) 4–3	Larry Brown (COY); Carl Scheer (EOY)	Larry Brown
1975–76	ABA	—	—	— (Note: The league abolished division play during the season.)	1st	60	24	.714	—	Won Semifinals (Colonels) 4–3; Lost ABA Finals (Nets) 4–2	David Thompson (ROY, ASG MVP); Larry Brown (COY); Carl Scheer (EOY)	Larry Brown
1976–77	NBA	Western	2nd	Midwest	1st	50	32	.610	—	Lost conference semifinals (Trail Blazers) 4–2	—	Larry Brown
1977–78	NBA	Western	2nd	Midwest	1st	48	34	.585	—	Won conference semifinals (Bucks) 4–3; Lost conference finals (SuperSonics) 4–2	—	Larry Brown
1978–79	NBA	Western	4th	Midwest	2nd	47	35	.573	1	Lost First round (Lakers) 2–1	David Thompson (ASG MVP)	Larry Brown; Donnie Walsh
1979–80	NBA	Western	9th	Midwest	4th	30	52	.366	19	—	—	Donnie Walsh
1980–81	NBA	Western	8th	Midwest	4th	37	45	.451	15	—	—	Donnie Walsh; Doug Moe
1981–82	NBA	Western	4th	Midwest	2nd	46	36	.561	2	Lost First round (Suns) 2–1	—	Doug Moe
1982–83	NBA	Western	6th	Midwest	2nd	45	37	.549	8	Won First round (Suns) 2–1; Lost conference semifinals (Spurs) 4–1	—	Doug Moe
1983–84	NBA	Western	7th	Midwest	3rd	38	44	.463	7	Lost First round (Jazz) 3–2	—	Doug Moe
1984–85	NBA	Western	2nd	Midwest	1st	52	30	.634	—	Won First round (Spurs) 3–2; Won conference semifinals (Jazz) 4–1; Lost conference finals (Lakers) 4–1	Vince Boryla (EOY); Dan Issel (JWKC)	Doug Moe
1985–86	NBA	Western	3rd	Midwest	2nd	47	35	.573	4	Won First round (Trail Blazers) 3–1; Lost conference semifinals (Rockets) 4–2	—	Doug Moe
1986–87	NBA	Western	8th	Midwest	4th	37	45	.451	18	Lost First round (Lakers) 3–0	—	Doug Moe
1987–88	NBA	Western	2nd	Midwest	1st	54	28	.659	—	Won First round (SuperSonics) 3–2; Lost conference semifinals (Mavericks) 4–2	Doug Moe (COY); Alex English (JWKC)	Doug Moe
1988–89	NBA	Western	6th	Midwest	3rd	44	38	.537	7	Lost First round (Suns) 3–0	—	Doug Moe
1989–90	NBA	Western	7th	Midwest	4th	43	39	.524	13	Lost First round (Spurs) 3–0	—	Doug Moe
1990–91	NBA	Western	14th	Midwest	7th	20	62	.244	35	—	—	Paul Westhead
1991–92	NBA	Western	11th	Midwest	4th	24	58	.293	31	—	—	Paul Westhead
1992–93	NBA	Western	9th	Midwest	4th	36	46	.439	19	—	Mahmoud Abdul-Rauf (MIP)	Dan Issel
1993–94	NBA	Western	8th	Midwest	4th	42	40	.512	16	Won First round (SuperSonics) 3–2; Lost conference semifinals (Jazz) 4–3	—	Dan Issel
1994–95	NBA	Western	8th	Midwest	4th	41	41	.500	21	Lost First round (Spurs) 3–0	Dikembe Mutombo (DPOY)	Dan Issel; Gene Littles; Bernie Bickerstaff
1995–96	NBA	Western	10th	Midwest	4th	35	47	.427	24	—	—	Bernie Bickerstaff
1996–97	NBA	Western	12th	Midwest	5th	21	61	.256	43	—	—	Bernie Bickerstaff; Dick Motta
1997–98	NBA	Western	14th	Midwest	7th	11	71	.134	51	—	—	Bill Hanzlik
1998–99	NBA	Western	12th	Midwest	6th	14	36	.280	23	—	—	Mike D'Antoni
1999–00	NBA	Western	10th	Midwest	5th	35	47	.427	20	—	—	Dan Issel
2000–01	NBA	Western	11th	Midwest	6th	40	42	.488	18	—	—	Dan Issel
2001–02	NBA	Western	12th	Midwest	6th	27	55	.329	31	—	—	Dan Issel; Mike Evans
2002–03	NBA	Western	14th	Midwest	7th	17	65	.207	43	—	—	Jeff Bzdelik
2003–04	NBA	Western	8th	Midwest	6th	43	39	.524	15	Lost First round (Timberwolves) 4–1	—	Jeff Bzdelik
2004–05	NBA	Western	7th	Northwest	2nd	49	33	.598	3	Lost First round (Spurs) 4–1	—	Jeff Bzdelik; Michael Cooper; George Karl
2005–06	NBA	Western	3rd	Northwest	1st	44	38	.537	—	Lost First round (Clippers) 4–1	—	George Karl
2006–07	NBA	Western	6th	Northwest	2nd	45	37	.549	6	Lost First round (Spurs) 4–1	Marcus Camby (DPOY)	George Karl
2007–08	NBA	Western	8th	Northwest	2nd	50	32	.610	4	Lost First round (Lakers) 4–0	—	George Karl
2008–09	NBA	Western	2nd	Northwest	1st	54	28	.659	—	Won First round (Hornets) 4–1; Won conference semifinals (Mavericks) 4–1; Lost conference finals (Lakers) 4–2	Mark Warkentien (EOY); Chauncey Billups (SPOR)	George Karl
2009–10	NBA	Western	4th	Northwest	1st	53	29	.646	—	Lost First round (Jazz) 4–2	—	George Karl
2010–11	NBA	Western	5th	Northwest	2nd	50	32	.610	5	Lost First round (Thunder) 4–1	—	George Karl
2011–12	NBA	Western	6th	Northwest	2nd	38	28	.576	9	Lost First round (Lakers) 4–3	—	George Karl
2012–13	NBA	Western	3rd	Northwest	2nd	57	25	.695	3	Lost First round (Warriors) 4–2	George Karl (COY); Masai Ujiri (EOY); Kenneth Faried (JWKC)	George Karl
2013–14	NBA	Western	11th	Northwest	4th	36	46	.439	23	—	—	Brian Shaw
2014–15	NBA	Western	12th	Northwest	4th	30	52	.366	21	—	—	Brian Shaw; Melvin Hunt
2015–16	NBA	Western	11th	Northwest	4th	33	49	.402	22	—	—	Michael Malone
2016–17	NBA	Western	9th	Northwest	4th	40	42	.488	11	—	—	Michael Malone
2017–18	NBA	Western	9th	Northwest	5th	46	36	.561	3	—	—	Michael Malone
2018–19	NBA	Western	2nd	Northwest	1st	54	28	.659	—	Won First round (Spurs) 4–3; Lost conference semifinals (Trail Blazers) 4–3	—	Michael Malone
2019–20	NBA	Western	3rd	Northwest	1st	46	27	.630	—	Won First round (Jazz) 4–3; Won conference semifinals (Clippers) 4–3; Lost conference finals (Lakers) 4–1	—	Michael Malone
2020–21	NBA	Western	3rd	Northwest	2nd	47	25	.653	5	Won First round (Trail Blazers) 4–2; Lost conference semifinals (Suns) 4–0	Nikola Jokić (MVP)	Michael Malone
2021–22	NBA	Western	6th	Northwest	2nd	48	34	.585	1	Lost First round (Warriors) 4–1	Nikola Jokić (MVP)	Michael Malone
2022–23	NBA	Western	1st	Northwest	1st	53	29	.646	—	Won First round (Timberwolves) 4–1; Won conference semifinals (Suns) 4–2; Won conference finals (Lakers) 4–0; Won NBA Finals (Heat) 4–1	Nikola Jokić (FMVP)	Michael Malone
2023–24	NBA	Western	2nd	Northwest	2nd	57	25	.695	—	Won First round (Lakers) 4–1; Lost conference semifinals (Timberwolves) 4–3	Nikola Jokić (MVP)	Michael Malone
2024–25	NBA	Western	4th	Northwest	2nd	50	32	.610	18	Won First round (Clippers) 4–3; Lost conference semifinals (Thunder) 4–3		Michael Malone; David Adelman
2025–26	NBA	Western	3rd	Northwest	2nd	54	28	.659	10	Lost First round (Timberwolves) 4–2		David Adelman
Denver Rockets regular-season record (1967–1976)						413	331	.555				
Denver Nuggets regular-season record (1976–present)						2,058	1,975	.510				
All-time regular season (1967–present)						2,471	2,306	.517				
Denver Rockets playoffs record (1967–1976)						27	35	.435				
Denver Nuggets playoffs record (1976–present)						114	148	.435				
All-time playoff record (1967–present)						141	183	.435				
All-time playoff & regular-season record						2,612	2,489	.512				
