= 1972–73 Denver Rockets season =

ABA professional basketball team season

- Head coach: Alex Hannum
- Owners: Frank Goldberg; Bud Fischer; Alex Hannum; J. William Ringsby (minority owner)
- Arena: Denver Auditorium Arena

Results
- Record: 47–37 (.560)
- Place: Division: 3rd (Western)
- Playoff finish: Division Semifinals (lost to Pacers 1–4)
- Stats at Basketball Reference
- Radio: KOA

The 1972–73 ABA season was the sixth season of the Denver Rockets as a franchise. It was also the first season where the team was no longer owned by J. William Ringsby and his son Donald W. Ringsby (who both had to sell the Rockets team due to trouble related to their local Ringsby Rocket Truck Lines business, though William still maintained minority ownership rights by this time), with San Diego-based businessmen Frank Goldberg and Bud Fischer further rebranding the Rockets team this season to help distance themselves away from the original Ringsby Rocket Truck Lines business association at hand for the team's own sake. Early on in the regular season, Denver was actually forced to forfeit a game against the Virginia Squires on October 26 (with official statistics for that game expunged from the record books) due to head coach Alex Hannum having his Rockets players foul the Squires' players under the pretense of a "pressure defense experiment"; the experimental pressure defensive plan in question that they played throughout the second half of that specific game resulted in the Rockets committing 56 fouls, which resulted in seven of the Rockets' own players fouling out of the game entirely, and it subsequently led to the Squires shooting 56 free-throws throughout the entire fourth quarter of that game for unofficial records of 53 points scored by Virginia in the fourth quarter and a total of 72/94 free-throws made by the Squires. It marked the second time in ABA history that a game would be declared as forfeited by someone (the first time happening in the inaugural season when a one-game playoff match to determine the final playoff spot in the Eastern Division for the 1968 ABA Playoffs led to the New Jersey Americans forfeiting their game to the Kentucky Colonels due to the arena that they were forced to use that night being declared unplayable on their ends), as well as the only time it would occur during the regular season in the ABA. Even with that in mind, however, the Rockets would have still lost their match to the Squires that night had the results stood firm like any other regular season match would have, with the unofficial final score being 155–111 in favor of Virginia instead as a blowout match. Despite the forfeited game they had, the Rockets still ended up with a 47–37 record, which was good enough for a third place finish in the Western Division. However, they would lose in the Division semifinals to the Indiana Pacers.

== ABA Draft ==
Weirdly enough, as of 2025, there has been no official draft records for the first five rounds of the 1972 ABA draft specifically, while every other round after that point has been properly recorded by basketball historians otherwise. Because of the strange dispersity of draft picks not being properly recorded this year after previously being fully recorded in the previous year's draft and the number of rounds potentially being off for even the players being selected this year, the recorded players selected in this year's draft will be marked with a ? for the pick number in particular (as well as certain round numbers, if necessary) in order to showcase the awkward display currently going on with the 1972 ABA draft year in particular (though what is known is that the Denver Rockets did pick up what can be considered as the official #3 pick of the ABA draft this year due to the Memphis Pros (as they were known as during that point in time) forfeited what would officially be considered as the #2 pick of the draft had it been kept properly due to Memphis signing away Larry Cannon from Denver sometime after the 1971 ABA draft period, as well as what can be considered as the official #6 pick of the ABA draft by a trade involving multiple players with the Indiana Pacers after the New York Nets also forfeited what would have been the official #5 pick had both the Pros and the Nets kept their picks due to the Nets signing Virginia Squires junior draft pick Jim Chones sometime after the 1971 ABA draft as well). However, if any changes come up to where a proper, official recording of the 1972 ABA draft gets released displaying both pick numbers and round numbers for where certain players got selected, please provide the updated (potential) draft ordering with a source confirming the round and pick numbers included here.

Round	Pick	Player	Position(s)	Nationality	College
1	3	Bud Stallworth	SG/SF	United States	Kansas
1	6	Paul Stovall	SF	United States	Arizona State
2	11	Claude Terry	SG/SF	United States	Stanford
3?	20?	Paul Westphal	PG/SG	United States	USC
4	30?	Doug Collins	SG	United States	Illinois State
5?	37?	Dave Bustion	PF	United States	Denver
6	46?	Sam Sibert	SF	United States	Kentucky State
7	57?	Ron Riley	PF	United States	USC
8	68?	Ted Martiniuk	F	United States	Saint Peter's College
9	79?	Bernie Fryer	SG	United States	Brigham Young
10	90?	Jerry Pender	SG	United States	Fresno State
11	101?	Gary Stewart	F	United States	Canisius College
12	112?	Michael Reid	G	United States	UC Riverside
13	123?	John Burks	F	United States	San Francisco
14	134?	John Tschogl	SF	United States	UC Santa Barbara
15	145?	Leon Huff	G	United States	Drake
16	154?	Phillip Sisk	G	United States	Georgia Southern
17	163?	Dave Hullman	PF	United States	Arizona State
18	171?	Harold Little	SG/SF	United States	New Mexico
19	175?	Andy Knowles	PG	United States	Louisiana Tech
20	178?	Al Davis	F	United States	Hawaii

This draft would be notable for a few things that the Rockets did. First, they would be the only ABA team to have multiple first round picks selected after some teams ended up forfeiting their first round picks in this draft for various reasons (some of which relate to things the franchise themselves previously did with regards to Spencer Haywood and Ralph Simpson in earlier ABA drafts). Second, the selection of Claude Terry marks the oldest one-time ABA All-Star Denver draft pick to stay with the franchise that later played in the final ABA All-Star Game with the Denver franchise that first selected him in the second round as the 11th pick of that draft. Third, the franchise would select Paul Westphal, a future Naismith Basketball Hall of Fame guard, in arguably the third round of the draft despite him never playing for the franchise whatsoever, instead having his best years with the Boston Celtics and Phoenix Suns in the NBA. Fourth, Doug Collins would end up later becoming the #1 pick of the 1973 NBA draft instead of playing with the Rockets as a fourth round pick in Denver. Finally, the Rockets would (supposedly) be the only ABA team to utilize all 20 rounds of the 1972 ABA draft since not only did they not lose any draft picks through measures that would have resulted in them forfeiting any draft picks like they previously had done in the last two draft years beforehand after previously acquiring Spencer Haywood and Ralph Simpson as undrafted college underclassmen on their ends, but they also picked up at least one extra first round draft pick from the Indiana Pacers for good measure, as well as not skipped out on using up any of their later round draft picks this year.

=== ABA Dispersal Draft ===
Months after the original ABA draft for this year concluded, the ABA held their first ever dispersal draft on July 13, 1972 after it was found out by the ABA itself that neither "The Floridians" nor the Pittsburgh Condors would be able to continue operations either in their original locations or elsewhere in the U.S.A. (or even Canada in the case of "The Floridians"). Unlike the main draft they did during the months of March and April, this draft would last for only six rounds as a one day deal and would have the nine remaining inaugural ABA teams selecting players that were left over at the time from both "The Floridians" and Pittsburgh Condors franchises (including draft picks from both teams there) and obtain their player rights from there. Any players from either franchise that wouldn't be selected during this draft would be placed on waivers and enter free agency afterward. Interestingly, only 42 total players were selected by the nine remaining ABA teams at the time of the dispersal draft, meaning everyone else that was available from both teams was considered a free agent to the ABA not long afterward. Not only that, but the Rockets were also the only ABA team to select players from only one of the teams involved with the dispersal draft in terms of selectable options, with Denver choosing players from "The Floridians" franchise (ignoring the Pittsburgh Condors' players entirely there), meaning they'll be the only team to not require an ABA Team section for their dispersal draft section. With that said, the following players from "The Floridians" franchise were acquired by the Denver Rockets during this dispersal draft.

Round	Pick	Player	Position(s)	Nationality	College
1	2	Warren Jabali	PG/SG	United States	Wichita State
1	7	Willie Long	SF/PF	United States	New Mexico
2	15	Scott English	SF	United States	UTEP
3	23	Al Tucker	SF	United States	Oklahoma Baptist

Interestingly, the Denver Rockets would be one of four ABA teams to acquire two first round picks in the dispersal draft instead of the usual one total first round pick that most teams had there, joining the likes of the Carolina Cougars, Dallas Chaparrals, and Memphis Pros turned Memphis Tams as the other three teams to have multiple first round picks there. The Rockets' first pick of Warren Jabali was one of two selections from that draft to later become future members of the ABA All-Time Team (the other being Mack Calvin, who also previously played for "The Floridians" alongside Warren Jabali). As for their last pick from that draft, Al Tucker, he would ultimately retire from play following his selection with Denver after last playing professionally for "The Floridians" franchise.

== Roster ==
1972–73 Denver Rockets roster
Players

Pos.	No.	Player	Height	Weight	DOB	From
PF	40	Byron Beck	6 ft 9 in (2.06 m)	225 lb (102 kg)	January 25, 1945	Denver
PF	14	David Bustion	6 ft 8 in (2.03 m)	215 lb (98 kg)	August 30, 1949	Denver
SF	20	Frank Card	6 ft 7 in (2.01 m)	195 lb (88 kg)	December 28, 1944	South Carolina State
SG	12	Warren Jabali	6 ft 2 in (1.88 m)	200 lb (91 kg)	August 29, 1946	Wichita State
PF	13	Julius Keye	6 ft 10 in (2.08 m)	200 lb (91 kg)	September 5, 1946	Alcorn State
SF	30	Willie Long	6 ft 8 in (2.03 m)	225 lb (102 kg)	March 1, 1950	New Mexico
PF	31	Marv Roberts	6 ft 8 in (2.03 m)	200 lb (91 kg)	January 29, 1950	Utah State
C	25	Dave Robisch	6 ft 10 in (2.08 m)	235 lb (107 kg)	December 22, 1949	Kansas
SG	44	Ralph Simpson	6 ft 5 in (1.96 m)	200 lb (91 kg)	August 10, 1949	Michigan State
PG	10	Al Smith	6 ft 1 in (1.85 m)	185 lb (84 kg)	January 15, 1947	Bradley
SF	21	Claude Terry	6 ft 4 in (1.93 m)	195 lb (88 kg)	January 12, 1950	Stanford
SF	24	John Trapp	6 ft 7 in (2.01 m)	210 lb (95 kg)	October 2, 1945	UNLV

Coaches
Head coach
- Alex Hannum

Legend
- (DP) Unsigned draft pick
- (FA) Free agent
- (S) Suspended
- Injured

Roster

== Season standings ==
=== Eastern Division ===
Team	W	L	%	GB
Carolina Cougars	57	27	.679	-
Kentucky Colonels	56	28	.667	1
Virginia Squires	42	42	.500	15
New York Nets	30	54	.357	27
Memphis Tams	24	60	.286	33

=== Western Division ===
Team	W	L	%	GB
Utah Stars	55	29	.655	-
Indiana Pacers	51	33	.607	4
Denver Rockets	47	37	.560	8
San Diego Conquistadors	30	54	.357	25
Dallas Chaparrals	28	56	.333	27

== Game log ==
- 1972-73 Denver Rockets Schedule and Results | Basketball-Reference.com

== Statistics ==
Rk	Player	Age	G	MP	FG	FGA	FG%	3P	3PA	3P%	2P	2PA	2P%	FT	FTA	FT%	ORB	DRB	TRB	AST	TOV	PF	PTS
1	Julius Keye	26	83	36.3	2.0	4.5	.435	0.0	0.1	.375	1.9	4.4	.436	1.6	2.8	.558	3.3	7.4	10.7	2.2	1.6	3.2	5.5
2	Warren Jabali	26	82	33.4	5.4	11.9	.453	0.4	1.7	.257	4.9	10.2	.486	5.9	7.3	.805	1.6	3.6	5.2	6.6	3.7	3.4	17.0
3	Ralph Simpson	23	81	32.0	9.0	20.6	.438	0.1	0.3	.208	9.0	20.3	.442	5.2	6.9	.757	1.7	2.9	4.6	2.7	3.5	3.0	23.3
4	Dave Robisch	23	83	31.9	6.3	12.2	.516	0.0	0.0	.000	6.3	12.2	.516	3.7	4.9	.756	3.0	6.0	9.0	2.0	1.6	3.3	16.3
5	Byron Beck	28	77	29.9	6.1	11.4	.530	0.0	0.1	.286	6.0	11.3	.532	2.1	2.6	.798	2.6	4.3	7.0	1.4	1.6	3.5	14.2
6	Al Smith	26	83	28.2	3.8	9.2	.411	0.2	1.1	.189	3.6	8.2	.440	3.3	4.2	.773	0.8	1.8	2.6	5.7	3.1	3.6	11.1
7	Marv Roberts	23	77	25.4	4.9	10.5	.463	0.0	0.0	.333	4.8	10.4	.464	2.6	3.3	.788	2.3	2.8	5.2	1.2	1.4	2.5	12.3
8	Willie Long	22	56	18.8	3.3	8.2	.400	0.0	0.0	.000	3.3	8.1	.401	2.5	3.2	.780	1.8	3.4	5.2	0.8	1.7	2.6	9.0
9	John Trapp	27	24	14.3	2.3	5.3	.422	0.0	0.1	.000	2.3	5.3	.429	0.8	1.3	.594	1.1	1.9	3.0	0.8	1.0	3.2	5.3
10	Claude Terry	23	68	9.8	1.8	4.2	.421	0.1	0.4	.417	1.6	3.8	.421	1.1	1.7	.649	0.7	0.4	1.1	0.9	1.0	1.6	4.8
11	Frank Card	28	4	9.0	1.5	3.8	.400	0.0	0.0		1.5	3.8	.400	2.3	3.3	.692	1.0	0.8	1.8	0.0	0.8	1.0	5.3
12	David Bustion	23	47	7.6	1.2	2.8	.436	0.0	0.0		1.2	2.8	.436	0.9	1.3	.712	0.8	1.3	2.1	0.4	1.1	1.7	3.4

== ABA Playoffs ==
ABA Western Division Semifinals

Game	Date	Location	Score	Record	Attendance
1	March 31	Indiana	91–114	0–1	7,051
2	April 1	Denver	93–106	0–2	7,235
3	April 3	Denver	105–94	1–2	5,335
4	April 5	Denver	95–97	1–3	6,904
5	April 7	Indiana	107–121	1–4	9,816

Rockets lose series, 4–1

== Awards and honors ==
- All-ABA 1st Team: Warren Jabali
- All-ABA 2nd Team: Ralph Simpson
- All-Defensive 1st Team: Julius Keye
- ABA All-Stars: Warren Jabali, Ralph Simpson
