= 1973–74 Denver Rockets season =

ABA professional basketball team season

- Head coach: Alex Hannum
- Owners: Frank Goldberg; Bud Fischer; Alex Hannum; J. William Ringsby (minority owner)
- Arena: Denver Auditorium Arena

Results
- Record: 37–47 (.440)
- Place: Division: 5th (Western)
- Playoff finish: Did not qualify
- Stats at Basketball Reference

The 1973–74 Denver Rockets season was the seventh season of the franchise and their last under their original Denver Rockets name. The Rockets ended up with a 37–47 record, which was tied for fourth in the Western Division, which necessitated a one-game playoff match at home versus the San Diego Conquistadors on March 29, 1974. Despite having the home-court advantage on display and the Rockets beating the Conquistadors throughout the majority of the regular season, the Rockets lost the game 131–111, which would have sent the Rockets up into the 1974 ABA Playoffs properly. Instead, it ended up becoming the second season in franchise history behind the 1970–71 season where the Rockets would miss the ABA Playoffs, which would also be the final season they'd miss the playoffs while using that particular team name. On August 7, 1974, in anticipation of a move to the National Basketball Association that already had a team christened the "Rockets" around in the NBA during the same season the Denver franchise was first created, the team was renamed as the Denver Nuggets, partially in tribute to the former original Denver Nuggets team of the same name that played in the National Basketball League and NBA before leaving the latter league in 1950 and renaming themselves as the Denver Refiners during their brief time in the short-lived National Professional Basketball League, which they still use to this day.

== ABA Draft ==
Interestingly, this year's ABA draft would involve four different types of drafts throughout the early 1973 year: a "Special Circumstances Draft" on January 15, a "Senior Draft" on April 25, an "Undergraduate Draft" also on April 25, and a "Supplemental Draft" on May 18. As such, the following selections were made in these respective drafts by the Rockets, which could be considered the last official drafts the Denver franchise would do in the ABA while using the Rockets name if you don't include them using that team name during the 1974 ABA draft period.

=== ABA Special Circumstances Draft ===
Round	Pick	Player	Position(s)	Nationality	College
1	1	Mike Bantom	SF/PF	United States	St. Joseph's
2	13	Clyde Turner	F	United States	Minnesota

Due to the "Special Circumstances Draft" being held in January, this draft was the only draft where the Rockets held the #1 pick for that specific draft. Every other draft that was done later in the year had the San Diego Conquistadors selecting first in each draft instead.

=== ABA Senior Draft ===
Round	Pick	Player	Position(s)	Nationality	College
1	6	Ed Ratleff	SG/SF	United States	Long Beach State
2	16	Steve Mitchell	F	United States	Kansas State
3	26	Kevin Stacom	SG	United States	Providence
4	36	Patrick McFarland	SG	United States	St. Joseph's
5	46	Larry Farmer	F	United States	UCLA
6	56	Martinez Denmon	F	United States	Iowa State
7	66	James Brown	F	United States	Harvard
8	76	Gary Rhoades	G	United States	Colorado State
9	86	Connie Warren	F	United States	Xavier University (Ohio)
10	96	Jeff Dawson	G	United States	Illinois (redshirt)

The "Senior Draft" done in April is often considered the official, main draft period of the 1973 ABA draft by basketball historians.

=== ABA Undergraduate Draft ===
Round	Pick	Player	Position(s)	Nationality	College
11 (1)	106 (6)	Marvin Barnes	PF/C	United States	Providence
12 (2)	116) (16)	Dennis DuVal	G	United States	Syracuse

The "Undergraduate Draft" is considered a continuation of the "Senior Draft" that was done earlier that same day, hence the numbering of the rounds and draft picks here.

=== ABA Supplemental Draft ===
Round	Pick	Player	Position(s)	Nationality	College
1	4	Lamont King	G	United States	Long Beach State
2	12	Tom Peck	F	United States	Wisconsin–Eau Claire
3	20	Lindell Reason	G	United States	Eastern Michigan

Of the eight teams that participated in this specific draft, the Rockets would be the team to utilize the least amount of selections from this draft with three total selections here when most of the other teams would at least have eight overall selections in mind for this draft. That being said, none of the three players selected in the "Supplemental Draft" would ever play for Denver (either as the Rockets or as the future Nuggets) once this draft concluded in May.

== Roster ==
1973–74 Denver Rockets roster
Players

Pos.	No.	Player	Height	Weight	DOB	From
PF	40	Byron Beck	6 ft 9 in (2.06 m)	225 lb (102 kg)	January 25, 1945	Denver
C	22	Mike Green	6 ft 10 in (2.08 m)	200 lb (91 kg)	August 6, 1951	Louisiana Tech
SG	12	Warren Jabali	6 ft 2 in (1.88 m)	200 lb (91 kg)	August 29, 1946	Wichita State
SG	23	Steve Jones	6 ft 5 in (1.96 m)	205 lb (93 kg)	October 17, 1942	Oregon
PF	13	Julius Keye	6 ft 10 in (2.08 m)	200 lb (91 kg)	September 5, 1946	Alcorn State
SF	30	Willie Long	6 ft 8 in (2.03 m)	225 lb (102 kg)	March 1, 1950	New Mexico
SG	15	Patrick McFarland	6 ft 5 in (1.96 m)	185 lb (84 kg)	December 7, 1951	Saint Joseph's
PF	31	Marv Roberts	6 ft 8 in (2.03 m)	200 lb (91 kg)	January 29, 1950	Utah State
C	25	Dave Robisch	6 ft 10 in (2.08 m)	235 lb (107 kg)	December 22, 1949	Kansas
SG	44	Ralph Simpson	6 ft 5 in (1.96 m)	200 lb (91 kg)	August 10, 1949	Michigan State
PG	10	Al Smith	6 ft 1 in (1.85 m)	185 lb (84 kg)	January 15, 1947	Bradley
SF	21	Claude Terry	6 ft 4 in (1.93 m)	195 lb (88 kg)	January 12, 1950	Stanford

Coaches
Head coach
- Alex Hannum

Legend
- (DP) Unsigned draft pick
- (FA) Free agent
- (S) Suspended
- Injured

Roster

== Season standings ==
=== Eastern Division ===
Team	W	L	%	GB
New York Nets	55	29	.655	-
Kentucky Colonels	53	31	.631	2
Carolina Cougars	47	37	.560	8
Virginia Squires	28	56	.333	27
Memphis Tams	21	63	.250	34

=== Western Division ===
Team	W	L	%	GB
Utah Stars	51	33	.607	-
Indiana Pacers	46	38	.548	5
San Antonio Spurs	45	39	.536	6
San Diego Conquistadors	37	47	.440	14
Denver Rockets	37	47	.440	14

== Game log ==
- 1973-74 Denver Rockets Schedule and Results | Basketball-Reference.com

== Statistics ==
Rk	Player	Age	G	MP	FG	FGA	FG%	3P	3PA	3P%	2P	2PA	2P%	FT	FTA	FT%	ORB	DRB	TRB	AST	STL	BLK	TOV	PF	PTS
1	Warren Jabali	27	49	34.9	5.2	13.4	.391	0.9	2.5	.366	4.3	10.9	.397	4.5	5.6	.803	1.7	3.3	5.0	7.3	2.0	0.2	4.0	3.4	15.9
2	Julius Keye	27	79	32.8	1.9	4.2	.447	0.0	0.1	.200	1.8	4.1	.451	0.7	1.1	.679	2.8	5.9	8.7	1.7	0.5	1.9	1.1	3.0	4.5
3	Al Smith	27	76	32.0	4.1	10.3	.399	0.3	0.9	.306	3.8	9.3	.409	2.5	3.2	.773	0.7	2.4	3.2	8.1	1.3	0.1	3.6	3.4	10.9
4	Ralph Simpson	24	75	29.9	8.0	18.6	.428	0.0	0.3	.083	7.9	18.3	.434	2.8	3.7	.754	1.5	2.8	4.3	2.5	1.4	0.2	2.6	2.5	18.7
5	Dave Robisch	24	84	29.4	5.3	11.3	.473	0.0	0.0		5.3	11.3	.473	3.8	4.9	.774	2.6	5.8	8.4	1.8	0.5	0.8	1.2	2.7	14.5
6	Steve Jones	31	42	27.5	5.7	12.7	.448	0.3	0.9	.361	5.4	11.9	.454	2.0	2.6	.771	0.8	2.5	3.3	3.0	0.3	0.1	2.6	3.0	13.7
7	Willie Long	23	82	25.1	4.7	11.3	.414	0.0	0.0	.000	4.7	11.3	.415	3.3	4.0	.831	2.4	3.3	5.7	1.2	0.7	0.2	1.9	3.0	12.6
8	Byron Beck	29	82	24.1	5.2	10.0	.516	0.0	0.0	.000	5.2	10.0	.517	1.5	1.7	.851	2.0	3.1	5.1	0.9	0.6	0.1	1.0	2.8	11.8
9	Mike Green	22	79	20.9	4.6	10.1	.459	0.0	0.0	.500	4.6	10.1	.459	2.1	2.9	.748	2.8	4.5	7.4	0.8	0.6	1.6	1.6	2.4	11.4
10	Marv Roberts	24	35	18.4	3.0	6.8	.447	0.0	0.0	1.000	3.0	6.7	.445	1.4	1.8	.774	1.7	2.1	3.7	1.3	0.4	0.1	1.4	2.1	7.5
11	Patrick McFarland	22	67	11.3	2.4	5.4	.443	0.1	0.4	.333	2.3	5.0	.451	0.5	0.8	.673	0.9	1.1	2.0	1.0	0.3	0.1	0.6	1.0	5.4
12	Claude Terry	24	60	9.8	1.9	4.3	.443	0.2	0.6	.400	1.7	3.7	.450	1.0	1.2	.870	0.4	0.8	1.2	1.2	0.2	0.1	1.0	1.1	5.0

== Awards and honors ==
- Assist per game leader: Al Smith (8.1)
- Total assists: Al Smith (619)
- All-Defensive 1st team: Julius Keye
- All-Rookie Team: Mike Green
- All-Stars: Warren Jabali, Ralph Simpson,
