= 1971–72 Denver Rockets season =

ABA professional basketball team season

- Head coach: Alex Hannum
- Owners: J. William Ringsby; Donald W. Ringsby
- Arena: Denver Auditorium Arena

Results
- Record: 34–50 (.405)
- Place: Division: 4th (Western)
- Playoff finish: Division Semifinals (lost to Pacers 3–4)
- Stats at Basketball Reference

The 1971–72 ABA season was the fifth season of the Denver Rockets. It would also be the final season where the team was owned by J. William Ringsby and his son Donald W. Ringsby, who both decided to help rebrand the Rockets franchise in order to separate themselves from the local Ringsby Rocket Truck Lines business association (which was starting to struggle financially by this point in time) by replacing the original team logo (which was a modification of the Ringsby Rocket Truck Lines logo) with that of a cartoony-looking rocket and changing their team colors entirely. The team finished the season with a 34–50 record, but still managed to qualify for the fourth and final playoff spot in the five-team Western Division by eight games over the Memphis Pros in what later became their final season under that team name. Denver would go the distance with the Pacers before ultimately falling short against them, with the Pacers going on to be the eventual ABA champions for the second time in three seasons. After the season ended, the father-son Ringsby duo would end up selling the Denver Rockets franchise to San Diego businessmen Frank Goldberg (who would only own the team for a few seasons following a further transformation from the original Denver Rockets team name to the modern-day Denver Nuggets namesake before leaving to purchase the San Diego Conquistadors in 1975 to have them briefly become the San Diego Sails) and Bud Fischer to help further distance the team from the original association with the Ringsby Rocket Truck Lines business in mind.

== ABA Draft ==
This draft was the first ABA draft to have a properly recorded historical note of every round in their draft available.

Round	Pick	Player	Position(s)	Nationality	College
1	4	Cliff Meely	PF	United States	Colorado
1	5	Ken Durrett	PF	United States	La Salle College
2	14	Marv Roberts	PF/C	United States	Utah State
3	26	Mike Newlin	SG	United States	Utah
4	34	Al Smith	PG	United States	Bradley
5	45	Dave Robisch	PF/C	United States	Kansas
6	56	William Graham	F	United States	Kentucky State College
7	67	Ken Gardner	SF	United States	Utah
8	78	Tyrone Marioneaux	C	United States	Loyola University (New Orleans)
9	89	Mike Childress	C	United States	Colorado State
10	100	George Faerber	F	United States	Purdue
11	111	John Ribock	F	United States	South Carolina
12	121	Gary Brell	F	United States	Marquette
13	131	Glen Richgels	C	United States	Wisconsin
14	140	Jerry Hyder	G	United States	Eastern New Mexico
15	149	David Hall	PF/C	United States	Kansas State
16	158	Richard Dixon	G	United States	Loyola University of Los Angeles
17	166	David Walls Jr.	PF/C	United States	Jackson State College
18	173	Paul Botts	G	United States	Central Michigan
19	180	Ron Smith	C	United States	Wichita State
20	186	Bobby Jones	G	United States	Drake

The Denver Rockets would join the Memphis Pros as one of only two ABA teams to use all 20 rounds of this year's ABA draft, with both teams also having an extra draft pick in an early round for good measure (in Denver's case, they would have two first round picks). The Rockets would originally have had three first round draft picks in a row going from picks 4-6 due to them previously having trades with The Floridians and the Virginia Squires respectively to go with their own first round pick at #4, but their own first round pick was considered forfeited for the second straight year in a row due to them acquiring another college underclassman after an ABA draft period concluded (in this case, acquiring Ralph Simpson from Michigan State University after previously acquiring Spencer Haywood from the University of Detroit), leaving them with only picks #4 & #5 (with pick #4 being from "The Floridians" franchise and pick #5 belonging to the New York Nets by the Virginia Squires respectively) in the first round instead.

=== ABA Special Circumstances Draft ===
Before the regular season began for the ABA, they would host a unique little draft held in Memphis, Tennessee (home of the Memphis Pros) called the "Special Circumstances Draft" that was done in response to the NBA implementing a new mini-draft of theirs for college undergraduate players called the "Hardship Draft" during the 1971 NBA draft period. Similar to the "Hardship Draft" in the NBA, only a select few teams would actually end up participating in this specific draft (in this case, the Denver Rockets, Carolina Cougars, and New York Nets). Unlike the "Hardship Draft" for the NBA (which saw five players get selected in that specific draft), however, the "Special Circumstances Draft" that the ABA held on September 10, 1971 (the same day as the NBA's own "Hardship Draft") had only three total players (all junior players while in college) get selected in this draft, with two players get selected in the second round and one player selected in the fourth round (meaning no first round or third round draft picks were made in that draft and the second round actually held the #1 pick in this particular draft). Because of the unusual formatting done there, the Denver Rockets would technically get the #1 pick in this specific draft, with this pick below being their only selection there.

Round	Pick	Player	Position(s)	Nationality	College
2	1	Mickey Davis	SG/SF	United States	Duquesne

Mickey Davis would be the #1 pick of the "Special Circumstances Draft" in the unusual sense that he was the very first selection from that draft, but wasn't selected in the first round of this particular draft. That being said, despite Davis being selected by the Rockets and Davis accepting his selection in the "Special Circumstances Draft" while denying his entry into the NBA's "Hardship Draft", he would actually end up playing for the Pittsburgh Condors during what ended up becoming their final season of play as a franchise before later playing for the Milwaukee Bucks in the NBA for the rest of his career instead.

== Roster ==
1971–72 Denver Rockets roster
Players

Pos.	No.	Player	Height	Weight	DOB	From
PF	40	Byron Beck	6 ft 9 in (2.06 m)	225 lb (102 kg)	January 25, 1945	Denver
PF	14	Art Becker	6 ft 7 in (2.01 m)	205 lb (93 kg)	January 12, 1942	Arizona State
PG	11	Larry Brown	5 ft 9 in (1.75 m)	160 lb (73 kg)	September 14, 1940	North Carolina
SF	20	Frank Card	6 ft 7 in (2.01 m)	195 lb (88 kg)	December 28, 1944	South Carolina State
SF	22	Julian Hammond	6 ft 5 in (1.96 m)	205 lb (93 kg)	May 27, 1943	Tulsa
PF	13	Julius Keye	6 ft 10 in (2.08 m)	200 lb (91 kg)	September 5, 1946	Alcorn State
F	23	Steve Mix	6 ft 7 in (2.01 m)	215 lb (98 kg)	December 30, 1947	Toledo
PF	31	Marv Roberts	6 ft 8 in (2.03 m)	200 lb (91 kg)	January 29, 1950	Utah State
C	25	Dave Robisch	6 ft 10 in (2.08 m)	235 lb (107 kg)	December 22, 1949	Kansas
SG	44	Ralph Simpson	6 ft 5 in (1.96 m)	200 lb (91 kg)	August 10, 1949	Michigan State
PG	10	Al Smith	6 ft 1 in (1.85 m)	185 lb (84 kg)	January 15, 1947	Bradley
F	24	Dwight Waller	6 ft 6 in (1.98 m)	220 lb (100 kg)	October 5, 1945	Tennessee State
PG	21	Chuck Williams	6 ft 2 in (1.88 m)	175 lb (79 kg)	June 6, 1946	Colorado
SG	12	Steve Wilson	6 ft 5 in (1.96 m)	185 lb (84 kg)	October 16, 1948	Hanover

Coaches
Head coach
- Alex Hannum

Legend
- (DP) Unsigned draft pick
- (FA) Free agent
- (S) Suspended
- Injured

Roster

== Season standings ==
=== Eastern Division ===
Team	W	L	%	GB
Kentucky Colonels	68	16	.810	-
Virginia Squires	45	39	.536	23
New York Nets	44	40	.524	24
The Floridians	36	48	.429	32
Carolina Cougars	35	49	.417	33
Pittsburgh Condors	25	59	.298	43

=== Western Division ===
Team	W	L	%	GB
Utah Stars	60	24	.714	-
Indiana Pacers	47	37	.560	13
Dallas Chaparrals	42	42	.500	18
Denver Rockets	34	50	.405	26
Memphis Pros	26	58	.310	34

== ABA Playoffs ==
ABA Western Division Semifinals

Game	Date	Location	Score	Record	Attendance
1	March 31	Indiana	95-102	0-1	6,103
2	April 1	Indiana	106-105	1-1	6,521
3	April 4	Denver	120-122 (OT)	1-2	5,304
4	April 6	Denver	112-96	2-2	6,109
5	April 8	Indiana	79-91	2-3	9,428
6	April 9	Denver	106-99	3-3	5,815
7	April 13	Indiana	89-91	3-4	8,643

Rockets lose series, 4–3

== Game log ==
- 1971-72 Denver Rockets Schedule and Results | Basketball-Reference.com

== Statistics ==
Rk	Player	Age	G	MP	FG	FGA	FG%	3P	3PA	3P%	2P	2PA	2P%	FT	FTA	FT%	ORB	DRB	TRB	AST	TOV	PF	PTS
1	Ralph Simpson	22	84	35.8	11.0	23.8	.460	0.0	0.3	.136	10.9	23.5	.464	5.4	6.8	.805	2.0	2.7	4.7	3.1	3.2	2.9	27.4
2	Julius Keye	25	84	30.4	2.3	5.7	.403	0.0	0.0	.000	2.3	5.6	.405	1.3	2.1	.621	3.8	7.9	11.7	1.8	1.7	4.1	5.9
3	Dave Robisch	22	84	28.8	6.0	13.5	.444	0.0	0.1	.000	6.0	13.5	.446	3.5	5.0	.702	3.4	6.2	9.6	2.4	1.3	3.0	15.5
4	Byron Beck	27	66	27.5	5.1	10.1	.504	0.0	0.0	.000	5.1	10.1	.506	2.1	2.5	.843	2.6	5.4	8.0	2.1	1.5	3.2	12.3
5	Larry Brown	31	76	26.5	3.2	7.3	.437	0.1	0.3	.200	3.1	7.0	.448	2.6	3.2	.811	0.7	1.5	2.2	7.2	2.9	2.7	9.1
6	Arthur Becker	30	84	26.1	5.2	11.4	.456	0.0	0.0	.000	5.2	11.3	.457	2.0	2.3	.846	2.0	3.6	5.6	1.3	1.6	3.2	12.3
7	Al Smith	25	83	21.3	3.5	8.1	.433	0.4	1.3	.299	3.1	6.8	.458	1.8	2.5	.725	1.0	1.7	2.7	3.0	2.0	2.9	9.3
8	Frank Card	27	73	19.8	3.1	6.8	.455	0.0	0.0	.000	3.1	6.8	.455	1.5	2.4	.651	1.9	2.6	4.5	1.1	1.6	2.8	7.7
9	Chuck Williams	25	84	18.8	3.1	6.9	.451	0.0	0.0	.000	3.1	6.9	.454	2.4	3.3	.745	0.7	1.1	1.9	1.9	1.2	1.7	8.7
10	Julian Hammond	28	25	16.4	2.6	5.6	.471	0.0	0.0		2.6	5.6	.471	1.2	2.0	.620	1.9	2.7	4.6	1.2	1.2	1.9	6.5
11	Marv Roberts	22	68	15.4	3.2	7.8	.407	0.0	0.1	.250	3.2	7.8	.408	1.3	1.8	.717	1.8	2.5	4.3	0.9	1.1	2.2	7.7
12	Dwight Waller	26	2	5.0	1.0	2.0	.500	0.0	0.0		1.0	2.0	.500	0.0	0.0		0.5	2.0	2.5	0.5	0.5	1.5	2.0
13	Steve Mix	24	1	4.0	1.0	1.0	1.000	0.0	0.0		1.0	1.0	1.000	0.0	0.0		1.0	0.0	1.0	0.0	0.0	1.0	2.0
14	Stephen Wilson	23	9	4.0	0.6	2.6	.217	0.0	0.2	.000	0.6	2.3	.238	0.4	0.8	.571	0.3	0.1	0.4	0.7	0.3	1.0	1.6

== Awards and honors ==
- All-ABA 2nd Team: Ralph Simpson
- ABA All-Stars: Ralph Simpson, Arthur Becker
