= John Q. Trapp =

American basketball player

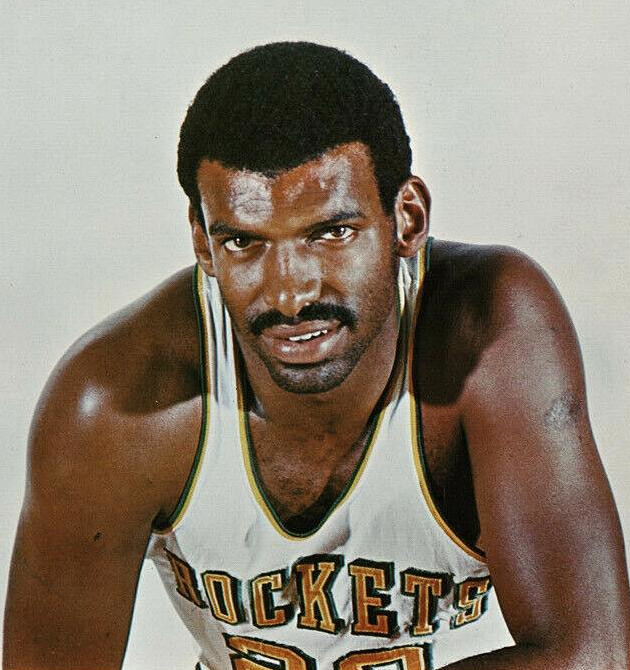
- Trapp, circa 1969
- Born: October 2, 1945; Detroit, Michigan, U.S.
- Disappeared: c. 1995 (aged 49–50)
- Basketball career

Personal information
- Listed height: 6 ft 7 in (2.01 m)
- Listed weight: 210 lb (95 kg)

Career information
- High school: Highland Park (Highland Park, Michigan)
- College: Voorhees (1963–1964); Pasadena CC (1966–1967); UNLV (1967–1968)
- NBA draft: 1968: 2nd round, 15th overall pick
- Drafted by: San Diego Rockets
- Playing career: 1968–1973
- Position: Power forward
- Number: 31, 24

Career history
- 1968–1971: San Diego Rockets
- 1971–1972: Los Angeles Lakers
- 1972–1973: Philadelphia 76ers
- 1973: Denver Rockets

Career highlights
- NBA champion (1972)

Career statistics
- Points: 2,193 (7.2 ppg)
- Rebounds: 1,320 (4.4 rpg)
- Assists: 303 (1.0 apg)
- Stats at NBA.com
- Stats at Basketball Reference

John Quincy Trapp (October 2, 1945 – disappeared c. 1995) was an American professional basketball player. A 6 ft 7 in (2.01 m) power forward from the University of Nevada, Las Vegas (then known as Nevada Southern University), Trapp played five seasons (1968–1973) in the National Basketball Association (NBA) as a member of the San Diego Rockets, Los Angeles Lakers, and Philadelphia 76ers. He averaged 7.4 points per game in his NBA career and won a league championship with the Lakers in 1972. He finished his professional career in the United States with the Denver Rockets of the American Basketball Association (ABA) in 1973.

Trapp helped lead Nevada Southern to the 1968 NCCA College Division basketball tournament, after winning the Pacific Coast Regional Tournament where he was on the all-tournament team. Trapp played under Naismith Basketball Hall of Fame coach Jerry Tarkanian at Pasadena City College (PCC), leading the 35–1 PCC team to the California Junior College tournament championship in 1967, while being named the tournament's most valuable player. He was inducted into PCC's Sports Hall of Fame in 2002, and his 1967–68 Nevada Southern team was inducted into the UNLV Athletics Hall of Fame in 1989.

== Early life ==
Trapp was born on October 2, 1945, in Detroit. He attended Highland Park High School, in Highland Park, Michigan, where he was a member of the Highland Park Polar Bears basketball team. As a junior, he was a 6 ft 4 in (1.93 m) or 6 ft 5 in (1.96 m) center on the 1961–62 team. He was a 6 ft 5 in center as a senior on the 1962–63 team.

== College career ==
Trapp attended Voorhees Junior College (now Voorhees University), in Denmark, South Carolina. He played on the basketball team during the 1963–64 season. He had 40 points in a mid-February 1964 game against Morris College, in Sumter, South Carolina. He next attended Riverside City College in California, but was not eligible to play basketball there. He did come to know future Naismith Basketball Hall of Fame head basketball coach Jerry Tarkanian, who was then coaching at Riverside. Trapp became close to Tarkanian, his wife Lois, and their four children, even babysitting the Tarkanian children.

When Tarkanian took a new job coaching with the Pasadena City College (PCC) basketball team starting in the Fall of 1966, Trapp transferred to PCC (being considered a sophomore transfer at that time). Trapp had some difficulties in his past and Tarkanian knew bringing Trapp to PCC could result in criticism for Tarkanian; but the Tarkanians had discussed at length whether they should bring Trapp to Pasadena with them, and believed he would only fall into more problems if he stayed at Riverside; most likely leaving school before graduating.

The 6 ft 7 in (2.01 m) Trapp played for PCC's basketball team in the 1966–67 season. He was one of the team's top scorers, was its leading rebounder, and was considered the team leader. By early December he was averaging nearly 20 points per game, and had two games when he scored over 30 points. He was named the most valuable player in both the Norm Verry Tournament and the Sam Barry Tournament during the season, both of which tournaments PCC won. The 1966–67 PCC team was 35–1, and won the California Junior College championship under Tarkanian that season, winning the state tournament. Trapp had 21 points in the championship game, and was named the tournament's most valuable player. In 2002, he was inducted into the PCC Sports Hall of Fame.

After one year at PCC, Trapp transferred to the University of Nevada, Las Vegas (then known as Nevada Southern University) for the 1967–68 season, under head coach Rolland Todd. Trapp played center on the 22–7 Rebels team, averaging 21 points and 11 rebounds per game. He helped lead the team to the NCAA College Division Pacific Coast Regional Championship in March 1968; also being named to the All-Tournament Team. The No. 10 ranked Rebels reached the national 1968 NCAA College Division basketball tournament in Evansville, Indiana; losing to No. 9 ranked Indiana State, 94–75. Trapp had 25 points in that game. The 1967–68 team was inducted into the UNLV Athletics Hall of Fame in 1989.

== Professional career ==
=== San Diego Rockets ===
The San Diego Rockets selected Trapp with the first pick in the second round of the 1968 NBA draft, 15th overall. The Rockets' first round pick (and the No. 1 selection in the entire draft) was future NBA Hall of Fame center Elvin Hayes. Hayes said that Trapp was the toughest player he faced in college. As a rookie, Trapp played in only 25 games, averaging 5.7 minutes, 3.1 points and two rebounds per game. The following season, Trapp played in 70 games, averaging 6.3 points and 4.4 rebounds per game. Trapp's best NBA season came during the 1970–71 Rockets' season. He played in all 82 games for the only time in his career, and averaged career highs in minutes per game (25.4), points per game (9.6), rebounds per game (6.2) and assists per game (1.7).

The Rockets franchise moved to Houston, Texas in August 1971. Before the start of the Houston Rockets' 1971–72 season, teammate Larry Siegfried said he saw Trapp as the key to the team's success or failure in the coming season. The Rockets waived Trapp less than one month later.

=== Los Angeles Lakers ===
Two days after the Rockets waived Trapp, he was signed by the Los Angeles Lakers. The 1971–72 Lakers team, led by Wilt Chamberlain, Jerry West, and Gail Goodrich went on to win the NBA championship, setting an NBA record 33 consecutive wins between November 1971 and January 1972. On March 19, 1972, the Lakers set the record for largest margin of victory in an NBA game, 162–99, over the Golden State Warriors; with Trapp scoring 19 points in that game. He played in 58 games for the Lakers that season, averaging 13.1 minutes, 5.7 points, and 3.1 rebounds per game.

Trapp began the 1972–73 season with the Lakers. He only played in five games, averaging seven minutes per game. On November 2, the Lakers traded Trapp and LeRoy Ellis to the Philadelphia 76ers for Bill Bridges and Mel Counts.

=== Philadelphia 76ers and Denver Rockets ===
Trapp went from one of the best teams in NBA history (Lakers, 69–13) to arguably the worst team in NBA history, the 1972–73 Philadelphia 76ers. The 76ers team record was 9–73 that season, recording the most losses in a single season of any team in NBA history. Trapp played in 39 games for the 76ers, starting 11 games. In nearly 22 minutes per game, he averaged 10.7 points, 4.8 rebounds and 1.2 assists per game. These were the only 11 starts of his entire 303 game career. In a rare 76ers victory, on December 6, Trapp scored a career-high 35 points in a 122–117 win over the Kansas City-Omaha Kings. During a game against the Boston Celtics while with the 76ers, he defended future Hall of Famer John Havlicek so well that Celtics' coach Tom Heinsohn (also a Hall of Fame player) made it a point to praise Trapp after the game.

76ers coach Roy Rubin was fired with a 4–47 record on January 23, and replaced by 76ers guard (and Trapp teammate) Kevin Loughery as player-coach. Loughery said he would give Trapp a reasonable opportunity to prove himself capable of playing the style of basketball Loughery intended to implement for the 76ers. In his first game under Loughery (January 26), Trapp played 27 minutes, with 13 points, seven rebounds and three assists. By his fourth game under Loughery (January 31), Trapp played only six minutes. The 76ers waived Trapp the next day, upon acquiring Don May. These were Trapp's final NBA games. Over his five year NBA career, Trapp had played in 279 games, averaging 17.3 minutes, 7.2 points, 4.4 rebounds, and one assist per game.

When the 76ers originally traded for Trapp, he was considered a "capable reserve". Trapp was known as a strong defender and rebounder, willing to do the "dirty work" in a game. He had career-averages of 15.1 points and 9.1 rebounds per 36 minutes. However, his behavior during the three months he was with the 76ers was viewed unfavorably at the time. As teammate Fred Carter said of Trapp years later, "Trapp played with a chip on his shoulder, but the chip was too big".

He was not well liked in the Sixers locker room. It is reported that when Loughery announced to the team he had released Trapp, they applauded. During his first game after coming to Philadelphia, when he was subbed out after only two minutes (out of five total) against the Kansas City-Omaha Kings; he cursed loudly enough to be heard in the cheap seats of The Spectrum. Later, after being suspended for skipping practice, Trapp was seen drinking Coke spiked with bourbon whiskey on the bench. In a December game against Detroit, Trapp reportedly told head coach Roy Rubin to look at one of Trapp's friends sitting behind the bench at Cobo Arena when Rubin tried to send in a player to substitute for Trapp. The friend opened his jacket to show a gun; Trapp stayed in the game. 76ers’ athletic trainer Al Domenico recalled Trapp was having a good game at the time and the team laughed at the gun incident. Domenico said on another occasion the team plane had been delayed by a bomb threat, and Trapp later told some of them he had called in the threat so he would not miss the plane and be fined. Philadelphia sportswriter Alan Richman, who had been a captain in the military during the Vietnam War and received a bronze star, said he was scared of Trapp during the time he was covering the team.

Trapp finished out the 1972–73 season with the American Basketball Association's Denver Rockets, joining the team on February 8, 1973. He played in 24 games with Denver, averaging 14.3 minutes, 5.3 points and .8 rebounds per game. The Rockets waived him in July 1973, coach Alex Hannum stating he did not fit in with the team's future plans.

Trapp had signed with the Atlanta Hawks and then was acquired by the Detroit Pistons prior to the start of the 1973–74 season began; but did not make either team. Trapp's younger brother George Trapp played as a reserve power forward for the Pistons that season. Trapp also played in the 1975 preseason with the Pistons.

He played in the Philippine Basketball Association, with Tanduay, in 1975.

== Personal life and death ==
Trapp's brother George also played at Pasadena City College (PCC) and for six seasons in the NBA, before dying in 2002 at the age of 53, after being stabbed with a knife during an altercation with his roommate. Both of the Trapp brothers are in the PCC Athletics Hall of Fame, with John honored in 2002. When Trapp transferred to Nevada Southern from PCC for the 1967–68 season, his brother George entered PCC that season and played basketball for PCC under Tarkanian that season.

According to ESPN, Trapp has not been heard from since at least 1995, when he was reported to be living in Detroit. A 2012 obituary for his aunt, Velonia Browning, mentioned Trapp as being deceased, but did not provide a date nor circumstantial details of his death. Several other public data sets list him as being deceased, but likewise do not provide a date.

== Career statistics ==
Legend
GP	Games played	GS	Games started	MPG	Minutes per game
FG%	Field goal percentage	3P%	3-point field goal percentage	FT%	Free throw percentage
RPG	Rebounds per game	APG	Assists per game	SPG	Steals per game
BPG	Blocks per game	PPG	Points per game	**Bold**	Career high
†	Won an NBA championship

=== NBA/ABA ===
==== Regular season ====
Year	Team	GP	GS	MPG	FG%	3P%	FT%	RPG	APG	PPG
1968–69	San Diego	25		5.7	.363		.655	2.0	.2	3.1
1969–70	San Diego	70		14.6	.426		.692	4.4	.7	6.3
1970–71	San Diego	**82**		**25.4**	.420		**.755**	**6.2**	**1.7**	9.6
1971–72†	L.A. Lakers	58		13.1	**.443**		.669	3.1	.7	5.7
1972–73	L.A. Lakers	5		7.0	.250		.700	2.8	.4	2.6
1972–73	Philadelphia	39	11	21.9	.412		.741	4.8	1.2	**10.7**
1972–73	Denver (ABA)	24		14.3	.422	.000	.594	3.0	.8	5.3
Career (NBA)		279	11	17.5	.420		.725	4.5	1.0	7.4
Career (overall)		303	11	17.3	.420	.000	.717	4.4	1.0	7.2

==== Playoffs ====
Year	Team	GP	MPG	FG%	3P%	FT%	RPG	APG	PPG
1972†	L.A. Lakers	**10**	7.1	.242		.571	**1.6**	**.5**	2.0
1973	Denver (ABA)	5	**10.2**	**.438**	–	**.667**	1.4	.4	**4.4**
Career		15	8.1	.306	–	.632	1.5	.5	2.8
