= Byron Beck =

American basketball player (born 1945)

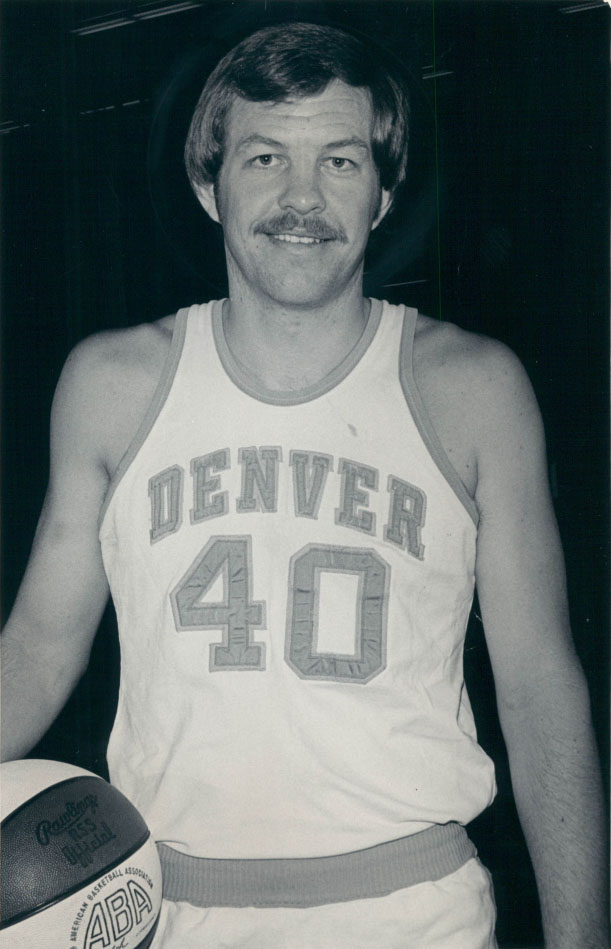

Personal information
- Born: January 25, 1945 (age 81) Ellensburg, Washington, U.S.
- Listed height: 6 ft 9 in (2.06 m)
- Listed weight: 225 lb (102 kg)

Career information
- High school: Kittitas (Kittitas, Washington)
- College: Columbia Basin (1963–1965); Denver (1965–1967)
- NBA draft: 1967: 2nd round, 15th overall pick
- Drafted by: Chicago Bulls
- Playing career: 1967–1977
- Position: Power forward / center
- Number: 40

Career history
- 1967–1977: Denver Rockets / Nuggets

Career highlights
- 2× ABA All-Star (1969, 1976); No. 40 retired by Denver Nuggets

Career ABA and NBA statistics
- Points: 8,603 (11.5 ppg)
- Rebounds: 5,261 (7.0 rpg)
- Assists: 978 (1.3 apg)
- Stats at NBA.com
- Stats at Basketball Reference

Byron Beck (born January 25, 1945) is an American former professional basketball player. He played nine combined seasons in the American Basketball Association (ABA) and National Basketball Association (NBA), all for the Denver Nuggets.

A 6 foot 9 inch forward/center from the University of Denver, Beck was one of six players (along with Louie Dampier, Gerald Govan, Bob Netolicky, Stew Johnson, and Freddie Lewis) who participated in all nine seasons (1967–1976) of the original American Basketball Association (ABA). Beck and Dampier would also be the only two players who would stay with the franchise that originally drafted them throughout the entire existence of the ABA before the ABA–NBA merger occurred, with Beck being the only player to stay with the team in question following the completed merger into the NBA. He played for the Denver Rockets, who later became the Denver Nuggets. Beck was not blessed with superior athleticism, but he was a hard worker known for his tenacious rebounding and efficient hook shot. He represented Denver in two ABA All-Star Games (1969 and 1976, the latter year having the Denver Nuggets franchise going up against the rest of the ABA's All-Stars that year).

Beck also played one season in the National Basketball Association (NBA) after the Nuggets joined the NBA through the ABA–NBA merger in 1976, and he retired in 1977 with 8,603 career ABA/NBA points and 5,261 career rebounds. On December 16, 1977, he became the first player in the Denver franchise to have his jersey number (#40) retired. In 1981, Beck was inducted into the Colorado Sports Hall of Fame.

After retiring from professional basketball, Beck moved to Kennewick, Washington where he worked as an engineer.

== Career statistics ==
Legend
GP	Games played	GS	Games started	MPG	Minutes per game
FG%	Field goal percentage	3P%	3-point field goal percentage	FT%	Free throw percentage
RPG	Rebounds per game	APG	Assists per game	SPG	Steals per game
BPG	Blocks per game	PPG	Points per game	**Bold**	Career high

=== ABA/NBA ===
==== Regular season ====
Year	Team	GP	GS	MPG	FG%	3P%	FT%	RPG	APG	SPG	BPG	PPG
1967–68	Denver (ABA)	71		22.9	.482	.000	.748	7.9	.5			9.4
1968–69	Denver (ABA)	71		32.2	.502	**.667**	.765	**11.0**	1.1			**14.5**
1969–70	Denver (ABA)	79		31.1	.523	.000	.787	9.7	1.4			12.9
1970–71	Denver (ABA)	**84**		**33.9**	.474	.286	**.868**	10.5	**2.1**			13.6
1971–72	Denver (ABA)	66		27.5	.504	.000	.843	8.0	**2.1**			12.3
1972–73	Denver (ABA)	77		29.9	**.530**	.286	.798	7.0	1.4	.6	.2	14.2
1973–74	Denver (ABA)	82		24.1	.516	.000	.851	5.1	.9	.6	.1	11.8
1974–75	Denver (ABA)	**84***		21.6	.515	.000	.835	4.1	1.3	**.7**	.2	10.1
1975–76	Denver (ABA)	80		19.8	.517	.455	.836	4.4	1.5	.6	**.3**	9.6
1976–77	Denver (NBA)	53		9.1	.435	–	.818	1.8	.6	.3	.0	4.7
Career (ABA)		694		27.0	.507	.295	.810	7.4	1.4	.6	.2	12.0
Career (overall)		747		25.7	.505	.295	.811	7.0	1.3	.6	.1	11.5
All-Star (ABA)		2	1	23.5	.542	–	1.000	7.0	.5			14.0

==== Playoffs ====
Year	Team	GP	MPG	FG%	3P%	FT%	RPG	APG	SPG	BPG	PPG
1968	Denver (ABA)	5	32.0	.460	–	.733	11.0	1.0			11.4
1969	Denver (ABA)	7	30.6	.505	.000	.824	9.0	1.3			15.7
1970	Denver (ABA)	12	36.6	.438	**.250**	.766	**12.0**	1.6			15.9
1972	Denver (ABA)	7	**37.7**	.487	**.250**	.929	10.3	**2.0**			**19.9**
1973	Denver (ABA)	4	32.5	.444	–	.765	9.8	1.3			17.3
1975	Denver (ABA)	**13**	21.4	**.515**	–	.857	3.8	1.4	**.3**	**.2**	12.5
1976	Denver (ABA)	**13**	21.2	.442	.000	.824	4.4	.8	**.3**	.1	8.6
1977	Denver (NBA)	5	5.8	.333		**1.000**	1.2	.2	.0	.0	1.6
Career (ABA)		61	28.9	.471	.200	.817	7.9	1.3	.3	.2	13.8
Career (overall)		66	27.1	.469	.200	.819	7.4	1.2	.3	.1	12.8
