= 1969–70 Denver Rockets season =

ABA professional basketball team season

- Division champions
- Head coach: John McLendon; Joe Belmont
- Owners: J. William Ringsby; Donald W. Ringsby
- Arena: Denver Auditorium Arena

Results
- Record: 51–33 (.607)
- Place: Division: 1st (Western)
- Playoff finish: ABA Western Division finals (lost to Stars 1–4)
- Stats at Basketball Reference
- Radio: KOA

The 1969–70 ABA season was the Rockets' third season. They ended up with a 51–33 record. Out of the 11 teams that played in the ABA that season the Rockets had the highest rating in simple rating system and offensive rating. Their 4-3 first round series win over the short-lived Washington Caps franchise would be their first playoff series win in franchise history, as well as their only playoff series win that they had while under their original Rockets name. They would also have a shot of making it to their first ABA Finals Championship series later that year, but they would surprisingly falter to the Los Angeles Stars (who had not only anticipated another losing season on their ends, but also entered the 1970 ABA Playoffs rather unexpectedly on their ends and had surprisingly upset the Dallas Chaparrals earlier on in the first round) in five games there. They would not win another playoff series until 1975, by which time they would change their team name from the Rockets to the modern-day iteration of the Denver Nuggets, which they still remain as to this very day.

== Roster ==
1969–70 Denver Rockets roster
Players

Pos.	No.	Player	Height	Weight	DOB	From
SG	14	Cliff Anderson	6 ft 2 in (1.88 m)	200 lb (91 kg)	September 7, 1944	Saint Joseph's
C	40	Byron Beck	6 ft 9 in (2.06 m)	225 lb (102 kg)	January 25, 1945	Denver
PG	14	Jeffrey Congdon	6 ft 1 in (1.85 m)	180 lb (82 kg)	October 17, 1943	BYU
SF	22	Julian Hammond	6 ft 5 in (1.96 m)	205 lb (93 kg)	May 27, 1943	Tulsa
PF	24	Spencer Haywood	6 ft 8 in (2.03 m)	225 lb (102 kg)	April 22, 1949	Detroit Mercy
PG	32	Larry Jones	6 ft 2 in (1.88 m)	180 lb (82 kg)	September 22, 1942	Toledo
C	52	Julius Keye	6 ft 10 in (2.08 m)	200 lb (91 kg)	September 5, 1946	Alcorn State
SF	19	Lonnie Lynn	6 ft 7 in (2.01 m)	215 lb (98 kg)	May 24, 1943	Wilberforce
PF	34	Walter Piatkowski	6 ft 8 in (2.03 m)	220 lb (100 kg)	June 11, 1945	Bowling Green
PG	11	Floyd Theard	6 ft 1 in (1.85 m)	170 lb (77 kg)	September 5, 1944	Kentucky State
F	50	Dwight Waller	6 ft 6 in (1.98 m)	220 lb (100 kg)	October 5, 1945	Tennessee State
SF	44	Ben Warley	6 ft 5 in (1.96 m)	200 lb (91 kg)	September 4, 1936	Tennessee State
PF	54	Greg Wittman	6 ft 8 in (2.03 m)	210 lb (95 kg)	May 10, 1947	Western Carolina
SG	42	Lonnie Wright	6 ft 2 in (1.88 m)	205 lb (93 kg)	January 23, 1944	Colorado State

Coaches
Head coach
- John McLendon / Joe Belmont

Legend
- (DP) Unsigned draft pick
- (FA) Free agent
- (S) Suspended
- Injured

Roster

== Season standings ==
=== Eastern Division ===
Eastern Division	W	L	PCT	GB
Indiana Pacers *	59	25	.702	-
Kentucky Colonels *	45	39	.536	14.0
Carolina Cougars *	42	42	.500	17.0
New York Nets *	39	45	.464	20.0
Pittsburgh Pipers	29	55	.345	30.0
Miami Floridians	23	61	.274	36.0

=== Western Division ===
Western Division	W	L	PCT	GB
Denver Rockets *	51	33	.607	-
Dallas Chaparrals *	45	39	.536	6.0
Washington Caps *	44	40	.524	7.0
Los Angeles Stars *	43	41	.512	8.0
New Orleans Buccaneers	42	42	.500	9.0

Asterisk Denotes playoff team

== Game log ==
- 1969-70 Denver Rockets Schedule and Results | Basketball-Reference.com

== Statistics ==
Rk	Player	Age	G	MP	FG	FGA	FG%	3P	3PA	3P%	2P	2PA	2P%	FT	FTA	FT%	ORB	DRB	TRB	AST	TOV	PF	PTS
1	Spencer Haywood	20	84	45.3	11.7	23.8	.493	0.0	0.1	.000	11.7	23.7	.496	6.5	8.4	.776	6.3	13.1	19.5	2.3	3.0	2.6	30.0
2	Larry Jones	27	75	40.4	8.3	19.2	.434	0.5	2.2	.248	7.8	17.0	.458	7.7	9.8	.791	1.9	3.3	5.2	5.7	3.2	3.0	24.9
3	Byron Beck	25	79	31.1	5.6	10.6	.523	0.0	0.0	.000	5.6	10.6	.524	1.7	2.2	.787	3.2	6.5	9.7	1.4	1.7	3.7	12.9
4	Jeffrey Congdon	26	83	29.7	3.6	9.3	.386	0.8	2.1	.354	2.8	7.2	.395	1.8	2.3	.786	0.6	2.2	2.8	5.4	2.5	2.5	9.8
5	Lonnie Wright	26	79	28.3	5.0	12.1	.413	0.7	2.4	.280	4.3	9.6	.447	1.5	2.2	.691	0.6	2.1	2.7	1.9	1.2	3.5	12.2
6	Julian Hammond	26	69	26.8	4.8	9.6	.498	0.0	0.0	.000	4.8	9.6	.499	2.4	3.5	.695	3.0	3.9	6.8	1.6	2.3	2.7	12.0
7	Julius Keye	23	77	21.3	3.2	8.0	.396	0.0	0.1	.000	3.2	7.9	.401	1.5	2.5	.601	2.4	4.4	6.9	0.6	1.3	2.7	7.9
8	Walter Piatkowski	24	74	17.6	2.9	7.2	.402	0.1	0.7	.220	2.8	6.6	.421	1.0	1.3	.768	1.4	2.0	3.4	0.6	1.0	2.4	7.0
9	Floyd Theard	25	25	16.2	1.6	4.5	.345	0.0	0.0	.000	1.6	4.5	.348	0.7	1.1	.643	0.3	1.7	2.0	1.8	1.8	2.0	3.8
10	Dwight Waller	24	7	12.4	1.4	3.4	.417	0.0	0.1	.000	1.4	3.3	.435	1.3	2.7	.474	2.3	3.1	5.4	0.6	2.3	1.7	4.1
11	Lonnie Lynn	26	12	11.7	1.7	3.8	.435	0.0	0.0		1.7	3.8	.435	0.7	1.0	.667	1.3	2.9	4.2	0.3	0.6	1.5	4.0
12	Ben Warley	33	42	11.3	1.4	4.0	.353	0.4	1.4	.259	1.1	2.7	.402	1.4	1.8	.763	0.6	2.0	2.6	0.7	0.9	2.3	4.6
13	Greg Wittman	22	50	9.1	1.6	4.1	.392	0.1	0.3	.235	1.5	3.7	.406	0.6	1.2	.542	0.6	1.4	2.0	0.3	0.7	1.7	3.9
14	Cliff Anderson	25	3	7.3	0.7	1.3	.500	0.0	0.0		0.7	1.3	.500	0.7	2.0	.333	0.3	1.0	1.3	1.3	1.0	1.0	2.0

== ABA Playoffs ==
ABA Western Division Semifinals vs. Washington Capitals

Game	Date	Location	Score	Record	Attendance
1	April 17	Denver	130–111	1–0	9,822
2	April 18	Denver	143–133	2–0	9,889
3	April 19	Washington	120–125	2–1	1,748
4	April 22	Washington	114–131	2–2	5,497
5	April 23	Denver	132–110	3–2	7,141
6	April 25	Washington	111–116	3–3	3,186
7	April 28	Denver	143–119	4–3	9,893

Rockets win series, 4–3

ABA Division Finals

Game	Date	Location	Score	Record	Attendance
1	April 30	Denver	123–113 (OT)	1–0	7,071
2	May 1	Denver	105–114	1–1	7,187
3	May 4	Los Angeles	113–119	1–2	4,468
4	May 5	Los Angeles	110–114	1–3	3,432
5	May 9	Denver	107–109	1–4	6,401

Rockets lose series, 4–1

== Awards and records ==
- ABA All-Star: Larry Jones, Spencer Haywood
- ABA All-Star Game Most Valuable Player: Spencer Haywood
- ABA Most Valuable Player: Spencer Haywood
- ABA Coach of the Year Award: Joe Belmont
- ABA All-League Team: Spencer Haywood, Larry Jones
- Spencer Haywood: 986 field goals (Nuggets single-season franchise record)
