= Cliff Anderson =

American basketball player (1944–2021)

Personal information
- Born: September 7, 1944 Philadelphia, Pennsylvania, U.S.
- Died: July 26, 2021 (aged 76) Philadelphia, Pennsylvania, U.S.
- Listed height: 6 ft 2 in (1.88 m)
- Listed weight: 200 lb (91 kg)

Career information
- High school: Thomas Edison (Philadelphia, Pennsylvania)
- College: Saint Joseph's (1964–1967)
- NBA draft: 1967: 4th round, 35th overall pick
- Drafted by: Los Angeles Lakers
- Playing career: 1967–1972
- Position: Shooting guard
- Number: 30, 40, 14, 22, 26

Career history
- 1967: Wilmington Blue Bombers
- 1967–1969: Los Angeles Lakers
- 1969: Wilmington Blue Bombers
- 1969–1970: Denver Rockets
- 1970: Cleveland Cavaliers
- 1970–1971: Philadelphia 76ers
- 1971–1972: Scranton Apollos

Career highlights
- Third-team All-American – NABC (1967); Robert V. Geasey Trophy (1967); No. 30 retired by Saint Joseph's Hawks

Career NBA and ABA statistics
- Points: 253 (3.0 ppg)
- Rebounds: 107 (1.3 rpg)
- Assists: 72 (0.9 apg)
- Stats at NBA.com
- Stats at Basketball Reference

Clifford V. Anderson (September 7, 1944 – July 26, 2021) was an American professional basketball player. He played collegiately for Saint Joseph's University.

He was selected by the Los Angeles Lakers in the 4th round (35th pick overall) of the 1967 NBA draft.

He played for the Lakers (1967–69), Cleveland Cavaliers and Philadelphia 76ers (1970–71) in the NBA and for the Denver Rockets (1969–70) in the ABA for 84 games.

Anderson died on July 26, 2021.

== Career playing statistics ==
Legend
GP	Games played	GS	Games started	MPG	Minutes per game
FG%	Field goal percentage	3P%	3-point field goal percentage	FT%	Free throw percentage
RPG	Rebounds per game	APG	Assists per game	SPG	Steals per game
BPG	Blocks per game	PPG	Points per game	**Bold**	Career high

=== NBA/ABA ===
==== Regular season ====
Year	Team	GP	MPG	FG%	3P%	FT%	RPG	APG	PPG
1967–68	L.A. Lakers (NBA)	18	5.2	.241		.429	.6	.9	1.4
1968–69	L.A. Lakers (NBA)	**35**	**8.3**	.407		.573	1.3	.9	**3.9**
1969–70	Denver (ABA)	3	7.3	**.500**	–	.333	1.3	**1.3**	2.0
1970–71	Cleveland (NBA)	23	7.4	.322		.683	1.6	.7	3.4
1970–71	Philadelphia (NBA)	5	5.7	.167		**.714**	**2.2**	.8	1.4
Career (NBA)		81	7.2	.351		.593	1.3	.8	3.0
Career (overall)		84	7.2	.354	–	.585	1.3	.9	3.0

==== Playoffs ====
Year	Team	GP	MPG	FG%	3P%	FT%	RPG	APG	PPG
1969	L.A. Lakers (NBA)	3	3.3	.400		–	.3	.0	1.3
