= Walt Piatkowski =

American basketball player (1945–2025)

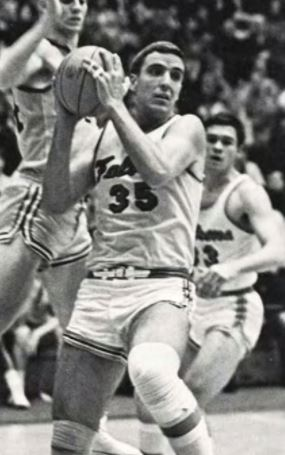
- Piatkowski as a junior at Bowling Green

Personal information
- Born: June 11, 1945 Toledo, Ohio, U.S.
- Died: August 18, 2025 (aged 80)
- Listed height: 6 ft 8 in (2.03 m)
- Listed weight: 220 lb (100 kg)

Career information
- High school: Woodward (Toledo, Ohio)
- College: Bowling Green (1965–1968)
- NBA draft: 1968: 8th round, 99th overall pick
- Drafted by: San Francisco Warriors
- Position: Power forward
- Number: 34, 43

Career history
- 1968–1970: Denver Rockets
- 1971–1972: The Floridians

Career highlights
- ABA All-Rookie (1969); 2× First-team All-MAC (1966, 1968); Second-team All-MAC (1967)
- Stats at Basketball Reference

Walter Piatkowski Jr. (June 11, 1945 – August 18, 2025) was an American professional basketball player in the American Basketball Association (ABA). He played college basketball for the Bowling Green Falcons.

A 6'8" forward, Piatkowski began his career at Toledo Woodward High School then starred at Bowling Green State University, where he was a Converse Honorable Mention All-American in 1968. He then played in the American Basketball Association from 1968 to 1970 as a member of the Denver Rockets. He received ABA All-Rookie Team honors with the Rockets in 1969 after averaging 12.2 points per game. When the Rockets acquired Spencer Haywood the next season, Piatkowski saw his playing time drop, and in 1970, he briefly retired to work as a teacher. He returned to the ABA in the fall of 1971 as a member of The Floridians, but he was waived just a month into that season. He later became a salesman with a paper company. He was Polish American.

Piatkowski's son Eric played basketball at the University of Nebraska–Lincoln; was drafted into the National Basketball Association (NBA) in 1994 as the 15th overall pick by the Indiana Pacers; and played 14 years in the NBA, mostly with the Los Angeles Clippers.

Walt Piatkowski died on August 18, 2025, at the age of 80.

== Career statistics ==
Legend
GP	Games played	GS	Games started	MPG	Minutes per game
FG%	Field goal percentage	3P%	3-point field goal percentage	FT%	Free throw percentage
RPG	Rebounds per game	APG	Assists per game	SPG	Steals per game
BPG	Blocks per game	PPG	Points per game	**Bold**	Career high

=== ABA ===
==== Regular season ====
Year	Team	GP	MPG	FG%	3P%	FT%	RPG	APG	PPG
1968–69	Denver	**77**	**23.6**	**.417**	**.329**	**.775**	**4.7**	**.6**	**12.2**
1969–70	Denver	74	17.6	.402	.220	.768	3.4	**.6**	7.0
1971–72	Florida	6	4.7	.188	–	–	.3	.3	1.0
Career		157	20.1	.409	.288	.772	3.9	.6	9.3

==== Playoffs ====
Year	Team	GP	MPG	FG%	3P%	FT%	RPG	APG	PPG
1969	Denver	**7**	**28.7**	.432	.111	**.909**	**4.1**	**.9**	**15.3**
1970	Denver	6	8.3	**.500**	**.250**	.500	1.8	.7	4.5
Career		13	19.3	.444	.154	.800	3.1	.8	10.3
