= 1970–71 Denver Rockets season =

ABA professional basketball team season

- Head coach: Joe Belmont; Stan Albeck
- Owners: J. William Ringsby; Donald W. Ringsby
- Arena: Denver Auditorium Arena

Results
- Record: 30–54 (.357)
- Place: Division: 5th (Western)
- Playoff finish: Did not qualify
- Stats at Basketball Reference

The 1970–71 ABA season was the fourth season of the Denver Rockets. They finished 30–54, but finished in a tie for the fourth and final playoff spot. However, they lost the tiebreaker 115–109 to the Texas Chaparrals.

== Roster ==
1970–71 Denver Rockets roster
Players

Pos.	No.	Player	Height	Weight	DOB	From
SG	23	John Barnhill	6 ft 1 in (1.85 m)	180 lb (82 kg)	March 20, 1938	Tennessee State
PF	40	Byron Beck	6 ft 9 in (2.06 m)	225 lb (102 kg)	January 25, 1945	Denver
PF	14	Arthur Becker	6 ft 7 in (2.01 m)	205 lb (93 kg)	January 12, 1942	Arizona State
PG	11	Larry Brown	5 ft 9 in (1.75 m)	160 lb (73 kg)	September 14, 1940	North Carolina
SG	35	Larry Cannon	6 ft 4 in (1.93 m)	195 lb (88 kg)	April 12, 1947	La Salle
SF	10	Wayne Chapman	6 ft 6 in (1.98 m)	190 lb (86 kg)	June 15, 1945	Western Kentucky
SF	22	Julian Hammond	6 ft 5 in (1.96 m)	205 lb (93 kg)	May 27, 1943	Tulsa
C	14	Dan Hester	6 ft 8 in (2.03 m)	210 lb (95 kg)	November 8, 1948	LSU
PF	13, 50	Julius Keye	6 ft 10 in (2.08 m)	200 lb (91 kg)	September 5, 1946	Alcorn State
PF	33	Don Sidle	6 ft 8 in (2.03 m)	215 lb (98 kg)	June 21, 1946	Oklahoma
SG	44	Ralph Simpson	6 ft 5 in (1.96 m)	200 lb (91 kg)	August 10, 1949	Michigan State
SG	12	Steve Wilson	6 ft 5 in (1.96 m)	185 lb (84 kg)	October 16, 1948	Hanover
F/C	30	Tom Workman	6 ft 7 in (2.01 m)	218 lb (99 kg)	1944-11-14	Seattle
SG	42	Lonnie Wright	6 ft 2 in (1.88 m)	205 lb (93 kg)	January 23, 1944	Colorado State

Coaches
Head coach
- Joe Belmont / Stan Albeck

Legend
- (DP) Unsigned draft pick
- (FA) Free agent
- (S) Suspended
- Injured

Roster

== Season standings ==
=== Eastern Division ===
Eastern Division	W	L	PCT	GB
Virginia Squires	55	29	.655	—
Kentucky Colonels	44	40	.524	11.0
New York Nets	40	44	.476	15.0
The Floridians	37	47	.440	18.0
Pittsburgh Condors	36	48	.429	19.0
Carolina Cougars	34	50	.405	21.0

=== Western Division ===
Western Division	W	L	PCT	GB
Indiana Pacers	58	26	.690	—
Utah Stars	57	27	.679	1.0
Memphis Pros	41	43	.488	17.0
Texas Chaparrals	30	54	.357	28.0
Denver Rockets	30	54	.357	28.0

== Game log ==
- 1970-71 Denver Rockets Schedule and Results | Basketball-Reference.com

== Statistics ==
Rk	Player	Age	G	MP	FG	FGA	FG%	3P	3PA	3P%	2P	2PA	2P%	FT	FTA	FT%	ORB	DRB	TRB	AST	TOV	PF	PTS
1	Julius Keye	24	83	43.8	6.1	14.2	.427	0.0	0.0		6.1	14.2	.427	2.6	3.8	.669	4.5	13.1	17.5	1.7	2.6	3.8	14.7
2	Larry Cannon	23	80	38.7	9.4	21.5	.436	0.2	0.9	.261	9.2	20.7	.443	7.6	9.5	.794	2.6	1.6	4.2	5.2	4.3	3.0	26.6
3	Byron Beck	26	84	33.9	5.8	12.3	.474	0.0	0.2	.286	5.8	12.1	.477	1.9	2.2	.868	3.3	7.2	10.5	2.1	1.9	3.3	13.6
4	Don Sidle	24	54	30.1	6.3	12.9	.488	0.0	0.1	.000	6.3	12.8	.492	3.6	4.8	.747	3.9	5.1	9.0	1.2	2.3	3.1	16.1
5	John Barnhill	32	24	28.5	4.2	10.6	.396	0.8	3.0	.250	3.5	7.6	.454	2.3	3.0	.740	0.8	1.4	2.3	3.2	1.7	2.3	11.4
6	Arthur Becker	29	29	27.7	6.3	12.6	.501	0.0	0.1	.500	6.3	12.5	.501	2.5	3.0	.839	2.8	4.4	7.2	1.1	1.2	3.7	15.2
7	Julian Hammond	27	83	25.1	5.2	10.0	.522	0.0	0.0		5.2	10.0	.522	3.3	4.5	.728	2.9	3.4	6.3	1.2	2.2	2.3	13.8
8	Larry Brown	30	34	23.9	2.5	6.9	.360	0.1	0.6	.263	2.4	6.4	.369	3.3	4.0	.824	0.3	1.5	1.8	6.1	3.4	2.8	8.4
9	Ralph Simpson	21	81	22.5	5.7	13.7	.415	0.2	0.7	.283	5.5	12.9	.423	2.7	3.5	.754	1.5	1.3	2.9	2.1	2.3	1.9	14.2
10	Wayne Chapman	25	47	22.3	3.9	10.3	.380	0.2	1.0	.229	3.7	9.3	.397	1.9	2.7	.690	0.9	2.1	3.0	2.3	2.1	2.7	10.0
11	Lonnie Wright	27	41	18.8	2.4	8.0	.299	0.4	1.4	.268	2.0	6.6	.305	1.3	1.9	.688	0.9	1.3	2.2	1.5	1.0	2.1	6.4
12	Dan Hester	22	35	13.2	2.3	5.9	.382	0.1	0.3	.455	2.1	5.6	.378	1.2	1.5	.824	2.1	3.5	5.7	0.9	0.9	1.9	5.9
13	Tom Workman	26	39	12.5	2.3	5.1	.447	0.0	0.3	.091	2.3	4.8	.468	1.5	1.7	.838	1.0	2.4	3.4	0.9	1.3	2.1	6.1
14	Stephen Wilson	22	39	6.7	1.3	3.4	.394	0.2	0.8	.242	1.1	2.5	.444	0.6	1.1	.537	0.6	0.7	1.2	0.7	0.8	1.1	3.4

== Awards and records ==
- ABA All-League Team: Larry Cannon
