= Floyd Theard =

American basketball player

Personal information
- Born: September 5, 1944 Chicago, Illinois, U.S.
- Died: April 12, 1985 (aged 40) Denver, Colorado, U.S.
- Listed height: 6 ft 1 in (1.85 m)
- Listed weight: 170 lb (77 kg)

Career information
- High school: St. Elizabeth, Chicago, Illinois
- College: Kentucky State (1963–1967)
- NBA draft: 1967: undrafted
- Position: Point guard
- Number: 11

Career history

Playing
- 1969–1970: Denver Rockets

Coaching
- 1972–1974: Manual HS
- 1974–1978: Iowa (assistant)
- 1978–1980: Kentucky State
- 1980–1985: Denver
- Stats at Basketball Reference
Medals
Men's basketball
Representing the United States
Universiade
Gold medal – first place	1965 Budapest	Team competition
Gold medal – first place	1967 Tokyo	Team competition

Floyd M. Theard Jr. (September 5, 1944 – April 12, 1985) was a professional basketball point guard and collegiate coach who played one season in the American Basketball Association (ABA) with the Denver Rockets during the 1969–70 season. He attended Kentucky State University, where he later returned to coach.

== Basketball career ==
After graduating from St. Elizabeth High School in, Chicago, Illinois, Theard attended Kentucky State University, where he played basketball and graduated in 1967. Theard represented the US, playing in two World University Games under coaches John Kundla, John Bennington and John McLendon, helping the team to gold medals in both occasions. Floyd then played one professional season for the Denver Rockets, averaging 3.8 points 2.0 rebounds and 1.8 assists in 25 games.

After beginning his coaching career at the high school level in Colorado, Thread became an assistant coach under Coach Lute Olson at Iowa, before accepting the head coaching position at Kentucky State, his alma mater, in 1978. Theard compiled a 36–22 record in two seasons at Kentucky State, with his teams finishing with 18–11 records in both seasons.

In 1980, Theard became the head basketball coach at the University of Denver. During his five seasons, the Denver Pioneers compiled a 107–38 record, which included a home–court winning streak of 79 consecutive games. In April 1985, while serving as the head basketball coach at Denver, Theard suffered a fatal heart attack at age 40.

== Honors ==
Floyd Theard was elected to the Kentucky State University Athletics Hall of Fame in 1987.

The Floyd M. Theard Jr. Memorial Award is given annually to the "University of Denver men's basketball player who best displays the qualities of leadership, scholarship and sportsmanship as demonstrated by Coach Theard during his lifetime."

Kentucky State University sponsors a Floyd M. Theard Jr. Memorial Basketball Scholarship.

The University of Denver hosts an annual Floyd M. Theard Jr. Memorial Golf Tournament, which raises money for scholarships. Alumni gather at the tournament. Speaking of Coach Thread, one former player shared memories. "Coach Theard was a man who believed in helping his student-athletes aspire to grow as human-beings," said Denver basketball alum Dr. Herb Parris. "I remember him saying so often 'If you are late for practice, you will be late for life.' That is a saying I will never forget, from an unforgettable person."
