= Joe Belmont =

American basketball player and coach (1934–2019)

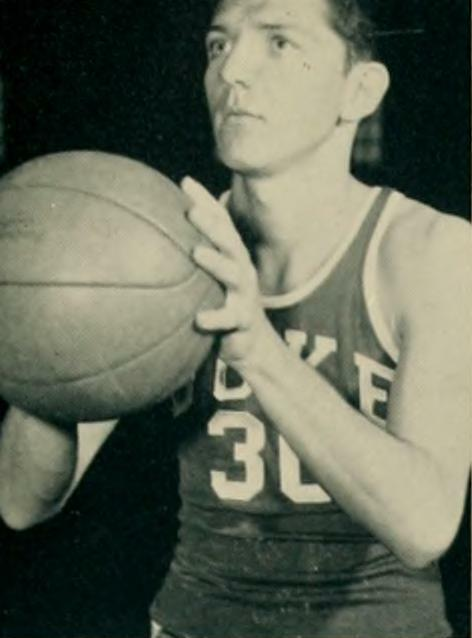
Belmont with Duke, 1953–54

Joseph Elliott Belmont (July 12, 1934 – January 6, 2019) was an American basketball player and coach. He played college basketball at Duke University, and was selected in the 1956 NBA Draft by the Philadelphia Warriors. He never played in the NBA, however. He had a long playing career with the Denver-Chicago Truckers of the National Industrial Basketball League.

In 1970, he was hired as the head coach of the American Basketball Association's Denver Rockets, a position he held for as season and a half. He shared ABA Coach of the Year honors in 1970 with Bill Sharman of the Utah Stars.

In 2005 Belmont was inducted into the Colorado Sports Hall of Fame.

== Personal life ==
In 1959 Belmont married Helen Sanquist and then had two kids. He died on January 6, 2019.

== Coaching career ==
=== ABA ===
Legend
Regular season	G	Games coached	W	Games won	L	Games lost	W–L %	Win–loss %
Playoffs	PG	Playoff games	PW	Playoff wins	PL	Playoff losses	PW–L %	Playoff win–loss %

Team	Year	G	W	L	W–L%	Finish	PG	PW	PL	PW–L%	Result
DEN	1969–70	56	42	14	.750	1st in Western	12	5	7	.000	Lost in Division finals
DEN	1970–71	13	3	10	.231	(fired)	-	-	-	-	(fired)
Career		69	45	24	.652		12	5	7	.417	
