= Claude Terry =

American basketball player

Personal information
- Born: January 12, 1950 (age 76) Salida, California, U.S.
- Listed height: 6 ft 4 in (1.93 m)
- Listed weight: 195 lb (88 kg)

Career information
- High school: Modesto (Modesto, California)
- College: Stanford (1969–1972)
- NBA draft: 1972: 3rd round, 42nd overall pick
- Drafted by: Phoenix Suns
- Position: Shooting guard / small forward
- Number: 21, 12

Career history
- 1972–1976: Denver Rockets / Nuggets
- 1976–1977: Buffalo Braves
- 1977–1978: Atlanta Hawks

Career highlights
- ABA All-Star (1976); First-team All-Pac-8 (1972); 2× Second-team All-Pac-8 (1970, 1971)
- Stats at NBA.com
- Stats at Basketball Reference

Claude Lewis Terry (born January 12, 1950) is an American former basketball player and coach. He played professionally in the American Basketball Association (ABA) and the National Basketball Association (NBA). Terry played four seasons with the ABA (1972–1976) followed by two seasons in the NBA (1976–1978). He played college basketball for the Stanford Indians (now known as the Cardinal), where he was an All-Pac-8 first team selection in 1972.

Terry was born in Modesto, California, and grew up in Salida. He attended Modesto High School. At Stanford University, he averaged 20.6 points per game over his three-year career. He began his pro career with the Denver Rockets, who selected him with their first pick of the ABA draft in 1972. He was selected in the 1972 NBA draft in the third round with the 42nd overall pick by the Phoenix Suns. Terry later played in the NBA for the Buffalo Braves and Atlanta Hawks.

After his playing career, Terry became a college head coach for the Stanislaus State Warriors and Seattle Pacific Falcons.
