= Steve Wilson (basketball) =

American basketball player

Personal information
- Born: January 23, 1945 (age 80); Richmond, Indiana, U.S.
- Listed height: 6 ft 5 in (1.96 m)
- Listed weight: 185 lb (84 kg)

Career information
- High school: Brookville (Brookville, Indiana)
- College: Hanover (1966–1970)
- NBA draft: 1970: 16th round, 227th overall pick
- Drafted by: Cleveland Cavaliers
- Position: Shooting guard
- Number: 12

Career history
- 1970–1972: Denver Rockets

Career highlights
- First-team All-Hoosier Conference (1970)
- Stats at Basketball Reference

Stephen Earl Wilson (born October 16, 1948) is an American former basketball player who played the shooting guard position. He played college basketball for Hanover before playing in the American Basketball Association (ABA) as a member of the Denver Rockets from 1970 to 1972.

Wilson attended Brookville High School before joining Hanover College in Hanover, Indiana. During his senior year, he averaged 20.3 points and 6.9 rebounds per game. He left the school as its fourth-leading scorer with a career total of 1,641 points for an average of 15.2 points per game and was drafted by the Cleveland Cavaliers in the sixteenth round (227th overall pick) of the 1970 NBA draft.
