= Alex Hannum =

American basketball player and coach (1923–2002)

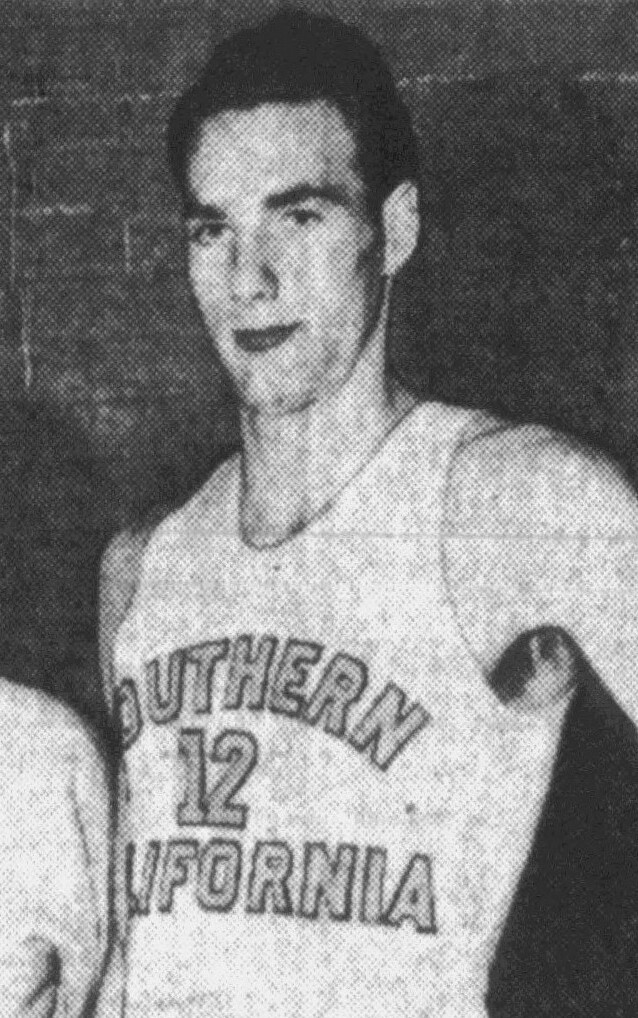
- Hannum, circa 1947

Personal information
- Born: July 19, 1923 Los Angeles, California, U.S.
- Died: January 18, 2002 (aged 78) San Diego, California, U.S.
- Listed height: 6 ft 7 in (2.01 m)
- Listed weight: 210 lb (95 kg)

Career information
- High school: Alexander Hamilton (Los Angeles, California)
- College: USC (1942–1943; 1946–1948)
- NBA draft: 1948: – round, –
- Drafted by: Indianapolis Jets
- Playing career: 1948–1957
- Position: Power forward / center
- Number: 10, 11, 20, 4, 6, 33, 18
- Coaching career: 1956–1974

Career history

Playing
- 1948–1949: Oshkosh All-Stars
- 1949–1951: Syracuse Nationals
- 1951–1952: Baltimore Bullets
- 1952–1954: Rochester Royals
- 1954–1956: Milwaukee / St. Louis Hawks
- 1956: Fort Wayne Pistons
- 1956–1957: St. Louis Hawks

Coaching
- 1956–1958: St. Louis Hawks
- 1960–1963: Syracuse Nationals
- 1963–1966: San Francisco Warriors
- 1966–1968: Philadelphia 76ers
- 1968–1969: Oakland Oaks
- 1969–1971: San Diego Rockets
- 1971–1974: Denver Rockets

Career highlights
- As player: First-team All-PCC (1948); As coach: 2× NBA champion (1958, 1967); NBA Coach of the Year (1964); 3× NBA All-Star Game head coach (1958, 1965, 1968); ABA All-Star Game head coach (1969); ABA champion (1969); ABA Coach of the Year (1969)

Career NBA playing statistics
- Points: 3,078 (6.0 ppg)
- Rebound: 2,013 (4.5 rpg)
- Assists: 857 (1.7 apg)
- Stats at NBA.com
- Stats at Basketball Reference

Career coaching record
- ABA & NBA: 649–564 (.535)
- Record at Basketball Reference
- Basketball Hall of Fame

Alexander Murray Hannum (July 19, 1923 – January 18, 2002) was an American professional basketball player and coach. Known as Sarge because of his military background, Hannum played center for six different teams, most notably the Milwaukee (later St. Louis) Hawks in the National Basketball Association (NBA), where he spent three seasons.

Hannum went on to coach for 12 seasons in the NBA, where his Hawks captured the 1958 league championship and his Philadelphia 76ers did likewise nine years later. In that span, Hannum became known as something of a Boston Celtics killer, as his were the only teams to interrupt their 13-year dynasty.

After Hannum moved on to the rival American Basketball Association (ABA), he guided the Oakland Oaks to the 1968-69 championship to become the first coach to win NBA and ABA titles. Bill Sharman was the only other coach to achieve the feat.

Hannum was inducted into the Naismith Memorial Basketball Hall of Fame in 1998.

== Early life ==
Alexander Murray Hannum was born on July 19, 1923, in Los Angeles, California. He attended Hamilton High School, where he excelled in basketball.

== College career ==
Hannum attended the University of Southern California (USC). He played basketball at USC in 1942 and 1943, but his time at USC was interrupted when he was called into military service during World War II in 1943. After three years in the military, he returned to USC for the 1946–47 and 1947–48 school years. During his senior year, he was captain of the 1948 team, and was an All-Conference selection.

He played basketball at USC under Naismith Memorial Basketball Hall of Fame coach Sam Barry. In addition to Hannum, Barry coached two other future Hall of Fame coaches in college, Tex Winter and Bill Sharman. Sharman was Hannum's teammate from 1946 to 1948 at USC. Both played with Winter at USC during the 1946-47 season.

== Professional career ==
On May 10, 1948, Hannum was drafted by the Indianapolis Jets in the 4th round of the 1948 BAA Draft.

=== Oshkosh All-Stars (1948–1949) ===
Hannum played three seasons of Amateur Athletic Union (AAU) basketball for the Los Angeles Shamrocks, before signing with the National Basketball League's (NBL) Oshkosh All-Stars. He played for Oshkosh during the 1948–49 season, averaging 5.7 points per game during the regular season and playoffs. Oshkosh lost in the NBL finals (which was also the team's final year in existence).

=== Syracuse Nationals (1949–1951) ===
Hannum played sparingly for the Syracuse Nationals from 1949 to 1951. Hannum is one of only three NBA players to receive more than six personal fouls in a single game (Don Otten and Cal Bowdler are the others). On December 26, 1950, Hannum received seven personal fouls in a game against the Boston Celtics.

=== Baltimore Bullets (1951–1952) ===
On July 14, 1951, Hannum was traded by the Syracuse Nationals with Fred Scolari to the Baltimore Bullets for Red Rocha. Hannum played in 35 games for the Bullets during the 1951–1952 season. His 27.4 minutes per game and 7.7 points per game were career highs.

=== Rochester Royals (1952–1954) ===
On January 18, 1952, Hannum's player rights were sold by the Bullets to the Rochester Royals. Hannum finished the 1951–52 season with the Royals, and played for them through the 1953–54 season.

=== Milwaukee / St. Louis Hawks (1954–1956) ===
On December 10, 1954, Hannum's player rights were sold by the Rochester Royals to the Milwaukee Hawks. Hannum played for the Milwaukee / St. Louis Hawks from 1954 to 1956. The Hawks had moved from Milwaukee to St. Louis after the 1954–55 season.

=== Fort Wayne Pistons (1956) ===
Hannum signed and played for the Fort Wayne Pistons in 1956, but was released by the team on December 12, 1956.

=== Return to St. Louis Hawks (1956–1957) ===
On December 17, 1956, Hannum signed as a free agent with the St. Louis Hawks. Hannum played for the St. Louis Hawks from 1956 to 1957, his last season as a player.

== Coaching career ==
=== St. Louis Hawks (1956–1958) ===
Midway through the 1956–57 season, Hannum was named player-coach of the St. Louis Hawks. He was actually the Hawks' third head coach that year. Red Holzman had been fired on January 7, 1957, in favor of Hannum's teammate, Slater Martin. However, Martin did not want to be a coach and a player, and delegated coaching authority to Hannum (his roommate) after one game, and gave up the reins after only eight games. Hannum was hired as head coach on January 21, 1957.

Hannum led the team to a 15–16 record for the rest of the season. Despite a losing overall record, the West was so weak that year (no team finished with a winning record) that the Hawks actually won the division title. They advanced all the way to the NBA Finals and lost to the Boston Celtics in seven games, losing by only two points in Game 7, in double overtime.

Hannum retired as a player after that season. A year later, led by Bob Pettit (a Hall of Famer and member of the NBA 75th Anniversary Team), Cliff Hagan, and Martin, the Hawks went 41–31 and won another division title before advancing to the 1958 NBA Finals to play the Boston Celtics. They upset the Celtics by two points in Boston for Game 1. Boston evened the series in Game 2, before going back to St. Louis.

In Game 3, Celtics star Bill Russell severely sprained his ankle as the Hawks prevailed 111–108. Boston evened the series in Game 4, but the Hawks won a narrow Game 5 to force a clinching game back home. Pettit scored 50 points, with 19 of them being among the final 21 scored by the Hawks, who won 110–109. Between the 1956–57 season and the 1965–66 season, this was the only NBA championship the Celtics lost. Coincidentally, the only two seasons in Russell's 13-year career in which the Celtics' center did not win an NBA championship were the direct result of losing to a team coached by Hannum (the 1957–58 Hawks and the 1966–67 Philadelphia 76ers).

It currently (as of 2024) is the only NBA Championship for the Hawks and it was also the last game coached by Hannum, who was not retained by owner Ben Kerner, whose interference irked Hannum. When he wanted a two-year deal, Kerner did not budge from wanting a one-year deal. Kerner replaced Hannun with Andy Phillip for the 1958–59 season (who in turn was replaced by Ed Macauley early in the season).

=== National Industrial Basketball League ===
Hannum coached the Wichita Vickers of the AAU National Industrial Basketball League in the 1958–59 and 1959–60 season.

=== Syracuse Nationals (1960–1963) ===
Hannum returned to the NBA in 1960 with the Syracuse Nationals, advancing to the Eastern Finals in his first season and losing in the first round two years in a row. He then left the team after the 1962–1963 season, the final one played in Syracuse prior to the relocation of the team to Philadelphia, which would be coached by Dolph Schayes, who was a future hall of fame player under Hannum for the Nationals.

=== San Francisco Warriors (1963–1966) ===
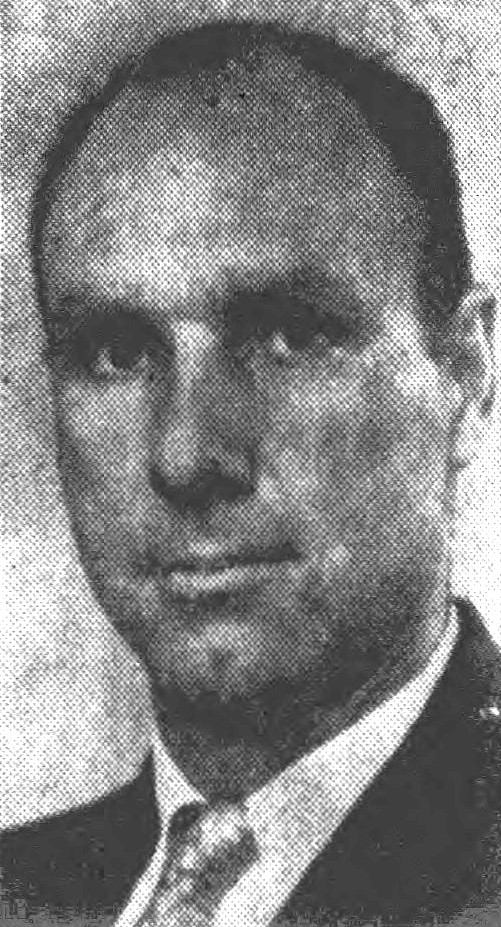
Hannum, circa 1963

Hannum had expressed interest in coaching the San Francisco Warriors when the team had moved to the region from Philadelphia in 1962. Eddie Gottlieb, the operator of the team before selling to Franklin Mieuli (prior to departing fully in 1964), had stated that Hannum was his third choice in mind next to Frank McGuire (who had coached the team the previous season in Philadelphia) and Bob Feerick. McGuire elected to resign rather than move to the West Coast and Feerick went 31–49 in the 1962–63 season before being fired. As such, Hannum was hired to coach the team for the 1963–1964 season.

That year, the Warriors, bolstered by rookie Nate Thurmond to go with Wilt Chamberlain, went 48–32 and advanced all the way to the NBA Finals, losing to the Boston Celtics. Hannum was named NBA Coach of the Year after the season ended. The following year was a disaster, as the Warriors won just 17 games while trading Chamberlain to the Philadelphia 76ers at the All-Star break. Despite the arrival of draft pick Rick Barry in 1965, the Warriors went 35–45 and missed the playoffs by one game. Hannum was fired after the season ended.

=== Philadelphia 76ers (1966–1968) ===
In 1966, Hannum was named the head coach of the Philadelphia 76ers. That team had moved from Syracuse three years earlier. He succeeded Dolph Schayes, who had been named coach after the move from Central New York. Despite winning NBA Coach of the Year, Schayes was still fired because of his strained relationship with Chamberlain. Hannum, now with a team that had players who had played under him in Syracuse such as Hal Greer and Chet Walker, and Chamberlain who he coached with the Warriors, were receptive to Hannum when he addressed the team's strengths and weaknesses. Hannum placed emphasis on changing the offense to rely on scoring in movement, while slowing the game down and playing half court. He wanted Chamberlain to facilitate the other players on offense instead of being the central scorer. This would see the reigning MVP Wilt Chamberlain score a career-low 24.1 points per game but also shoot 68.3% on his field goal attempts.

Hannum had convinced Chamberlain that focusing more on defense and passing would bring the team greater success. Chamberlain was third in the league with 7.8 assists per game (behind only Hall of Fame point guards Guy Rodgers and Oscar Robertson), and it was the first year he averaged less than 33 points per game. Under Hannum the following season, Chamberlain averaged 8.6 assists per game (second behind Robertson), with the most total assists.

During his first season as coach, the 76ers had a record setting season as they started 46–4, en route to a record of 68–13, the best record in league history at the time. After a 129–103 win over the Pistons on March 3, 1967, he joined Red Auerbach as the only coaches to have won 60 games in a season at that period. Hannum led the Sixers towards the 63rd victory, breaking the NBA-record for most wins in a single season, in an overtime win over the Boston Celtics. On March 14, 1967, he became the first coach to have won 65 games in a season. Chamberlain would be awarded the MVP for the second straight season. Hannum then coached the Wilt Chamberlain-led Philadelphia 76ers to the NBA championship, ending the eight-year title streak of the Boston Celtics.

The 1967 Championship made him the first of only three head coaches in NBA history to win championships with two different teams (the other two are Phil Jackson and Pat Riley). The following year, the 76ers won 62 games for another division title and advanced all the way to the Eastern Division Finals, but the loss of Billy Cunningham, due to a broken wrist in the Eastern Division Semifinals victory, came to hinder the team. The 76ers lost to the Celtics in seven games after having won three of the first four games. It was the first time in NBA playoff history that a team had lost a playoff series after being up 3-1. Hannum left the team after the season to coach the Oakland Oaks in the newly created American Basketball Association.

=== Oakland Oaks (1968–1969) ===
On May 3, 1968, Hannum signed a deal to become the head coach and executive vice president of the Oakland Oaks of the American Basketball Association, as owned by singer Pat Boone along with S. Kenneth Davidson and Dennis A. Murphy. He took the offer over coaching the Warriors because of the offer of an ownership stake and a "special relish to competing against Mieuli", who he called a promoter of himself first. The team would have the services of Rick Barry, who sat out a year rather than play it out with the Warriors when he tried to jump to the Oaks (who also offered Barry a stake in the team just like Hannum) the previous year.

Tasked with improving the worst team in the ABA the previous season, Hannum coached the Oaks to 60 wins (jumping out to a 25–4 start) even with the loss of Barry to a knee injury that saw him play 35 games. While fans were not particularly plentiful in Oakland, the Oaks had a 16-game winning streak occur at one point during the year. He was selected to coach the Western Division in the ABA All-Star Game that year. Having previously coached the NBA All-Star Game in 1968, Hannum became the first person to coach the All-Star Game in two different basketball leagues. Warren Jabali (the ABA Rookie of the Year that season) delivered the 1969 ABA Championship over the Indiana Pacers with a performance that saw him named Playoffs MVP, which he closed out with a 39-point performance in clinching Game 5. The Oaks point guard was Larry Brown and backup small forward Doug Moe (who started in the finals), both of whom would go on to long coaching careers, and the Hall of Fame in Brown's case.

With the win (the first basketball championship by a West Coast team), Hannum became the first of two coaches to win championships in both the NBA and ABA, the other being his USC teammate Bill Sharman. Hannum won the ABA Coach of the Year honors the same season. Hannum left after the season ended as the Oaks relocated to become the Washington Caps under new management by Earl Foreman.

=== San Diego Rockets (1969–1971) ===
Hannum was hired to be the head coach of the San Diego Rockets 26 gamed into the 1969–1970 season to replace Jack McMahon. The third-year franchise won 27 games that year before improving to 40 the following year, but a seven-game winning streak at the end of the season was all for naught as they narrowly finished one game behind San Francisco for second place in the Pacific Division, which would have meant a playoff spot. One of Hannum's players in San Diego was future Hall of Fame coach Pat Riley. On April 8, 1971, less than three weeks after the end of season, Hannum left the team, which soon relocated to Houston, Texas. The Rockets first coach in Houston, succeeding Hannum, was Tex Winter, Hannum's old USC teammate.

=== Denver Rockets (1971–1974) ===
Hannum left his position as head coach of the San Diego Rockets of the NBA to become president, general manager and head coach of the ABA's Denver Rockets (later the Denver Nuggets) on April 8, 1971. It was Hannum who instituted changes to the color scheme of the team from orange and black to columbine blue and yellow. In his first season, 1971–1972, the Rockets lost their opening playoff match to the Indiana Pacers in a seven-game series. Once again, Larry Brown was Hannum's point guard.

On June 13, 1972, Hannum bought control of the Rockets with A.G. "Bud" Fischer and Frank M. Goldberg. On October 26, 1972, Hannum engaged in an unusual strategy. He instructed his players to foul any player of the Virginia Squires that was taking a shot in the fourth quarter. The result was a 155–111 victory that saw Virginia score 74 free throws while Denver had seven players foul out. The records for that quarter were later expunged and the game was declared a forfeit. Hannum said he was conducting an experiment because of “the trend of pressure defense...I wanted to see how far you could go without hurting your team's chances."

In the 1972–73 season, Hannum coached the Rockets to the 1973 ABA Playoffs where they again lost in the first round of the Western Division playoffs to the Indiana Pacers, four games to one. Hannum returned the Rockets to the 1974 ABA Playoffs where they lost to the San Diego Conquistadors in a one-game tie-breaker playoff. On April 30, 1974, Hannum was dismissed as president, general manager and head coach of the Rockets (rebranded to Nuggets after the season ended) for Larry Brown, who had played for Denver in the 1971–72 season before being a head coach with Carolina. Hannum never coached again.

Hannum's combined record (NBA and ABA), was 649–564 (.535) with a 61–46 record (.570) in the playoffs on 11 trips in 16 seasons.

== Honors ==
Hannum was inducted into the Naismith Memorial Basketball Hall of Fame in 1998.

At least fourteen Hall-of-Famer players played for Hannum. In addition to Pettit, Chamberlain and Barry, he had also coached Cliff Hagan, Ed Macauley, Slater Martin, Dolph Schayes, Nate Thurmond, Billy Cunningham, Hal Greer, Elvin Hayes, Calvin Murphy, Chet Walker, and Guy Rodgers (for the Warriors). In addition, future Hall of Fame coaches Pat Riley and Larry Brown played under Hannum, as did Hall-of-Famer Al Attles (for the Warriors), who contributed to the team as a player, coach and executive over six decades.

== Personal life ==
Hannum, a native of Los Angeles, and graduate of the University of Southern California, died at the age of 78 in San Diego.

== Career statistics ==
Legend
GP	Games played	GS	Games started	MPG	Minutes per game
FG%	Field goal percentage	3P%	3-point field goal percentage	FT%	Free throw percentage
RPG	Rebounds per game	APG	Assists per game	SPG	Steals per game
BPG	Blocks per game	PPG	Points per game	**Bold**	Career high

=== Playing ===
==== NBA ====
===== Regular season =====
Year	Team	GP	MPG	FG%	FT%	RPG	APG	PPG
1949–50	Syracuse	64	–	.363	.688	–	2.0	7.5
1950–51	Syracuse	63	–	.368	.543	4.8	1.9	7.5
1951–52	Baltimore	35*	**27.4**	.353	.683	**5.5**	2.1	**7.7**
1951–52	Rochester	31*	17.7	**.395**	**.750**	4.6	1.9	5.5
1952–53	Rochester	68	18.9	.358	.662	4.1	1.2	5.1
1953–54	Rochester	**72**	23.7	.348	.622	4.9	1.5	6.3
1954–55	Milwaukee	53	20.5	.352	.570	4.6	2.0	5.9
1955–56	St. Louis	71	20.8	.322	.604	4.8	**2.2**	5.4
1956–57	Fort Wayne	22	10.0	.382	.600	2.5	.5	3.2
1956–57	St. Louis	37	11.4	.327	.694	2.8	.5	3.3
Career		516	19.8	.354	.629	4.5	1.7	6.0

===== Playoffs =====
Year	Team	GP	MPG	FG%	FT%	RPG	APG	PPG
1950	Syracuse	**11**	–	**.442**	.500	–	.9	**8.5**
1951	Syracuse	7	–	.436	**.800**	**6.7**	**2.4**	6.0
1952	Rochester	6	**24.3**	.381	.615	4.3	1.3	6.7
1953	Rochester	3	17.3	.400	.375	1.3	.7	3.7
1954	Rochester	6	17.8	.414	.625	3.7	.8	6.5
1956	St. Louis	8	19.9	.318	.543	3.6	1.3	7.6
1957	St. Louis	2	3.0	.000	–	.0	.0	.0
Career		43	18.8	.394	.565	4.0	1.2	6.7

=== Head coaching record ===
Legend
Regular season	G	Games coached	W	Games won	L	Games lost	W–L %	Win–loss %
Playoffs	PG	Playoff games	PW	Playoff wins	PL	Playoff losses	PW–L %	Playoff win–loss %

Team	Year	G	W	L	W–L%	Finish	PG	PW	PL	PW–L%	Result
St. Louis	1956–57	31	15	16	.484	1st in Western	10	6	4	.600	Lost in NBA Finals
St. Louis	1957–58	72	41	31	.569	1st in Western	11	8	3	.727	**Won NBA Finals**
Syracuse	1960–61	79	38	41	.481	3rd in Eastern	8	4	4	.500	Lost Division finals
Syracuse	1961–62	80	41	39	.513	3rd in Eastern	5	2	3	.400	Lost Division semifinals
Syracuse	1962–63	80	48	32	.600	2nd in Eastern	8	4	4	.500	Lost Division semifinals
San Francisco	1963–64	80	48	32	.600	1st in Western	8	4	4	.500	Lost in NBA Finals
San Francisco	1964–65	80	17	63	.213	5th in Western	—	—	—	—	Missed playoffs
San Francisco	1965–66	80	35	45	.438	4th in Western	—	—	—	—	Missed playoffs
Philadelphia	1966–67	81	68	13	.745	1st in Eastern	15	11	4	.733	**Won NBA Finals**
Philadelphia	1967–68	82	62	20	.756	1st in Eastern	13	7	6	.538	Lost Division finals
Oakland	1968–69	78	60	18	.769	1st in Western	16	12	4	.750	**Won ABA Finals**
San Diego	1969–70	56	18	38	.321	7th in Western	—	—	—	—	Missed playoffs
San Diego	1970–71	82	40	42	.488	3rd in Pacific	—	—	—	—	Missed playoffs
Denver	1971–72	84	34	50	.405	4th in Western	7	3	4	.429	Lost Division semifinals
Denver	1972–73	84	47	37	.565	3rd in Western	5	1	4	.200	Lost Division semifinals
Denver	1973–74	84	37	47	.440	4th in Western	—	—	—	—	Missed playoffs
Career		1,213	649	564	.535		107	61	46	.570	

Sporting positions
Preceded by Bruce Hale	Oakland Oaks head coach 1968–1969	Succeeded by Al Bianchi
