= Frank Card =

American basketball player

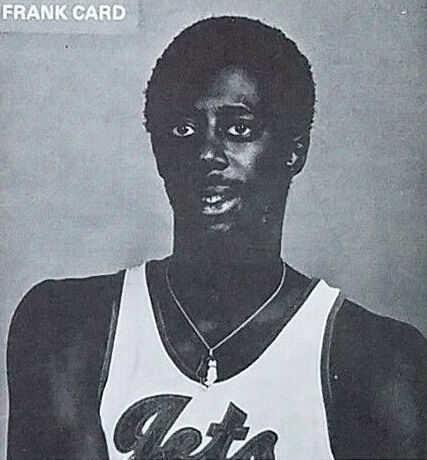
- Card with the Allentown Jets in 1973

Personal information
- Born: December 28, 1944 Philadelphia, Pennsylvania, U.S.
- Died: April 14, 2021 (aged 76)
- Listed height: 6 ft 7 in (2.01 m)
- Listed weight: 195 lb (88 kg)

Career information
- High school: West Philadelphia (Philadelphia, Pennsylvania)
- College: South Carolina State (1962–1964)
- NBA draft: 1967: 7th round, 77th overall pick
- Drafted by: Philadelphia 76ers
- Playing career: 1965–1974
- Position: Power forward / small forward
- Number: 35, 34, 13, 20

Career history
- 1965–1966: Camden Bullets
- 1966–1968: Allentown Jets
- 1968–1969: Minnesota Pipers
- 1969–1970: Washington Caps / Virginia Squires
- 1970–1971: Carolina Cougars
- 1971–1973: Denver Rockets
- 1972–1974: Allentown Jets

Career highlights
- EPBL champion (1968)
- Stats at Basketball Reference

Frank Howard Card (December 28, 1944 – April 14, 2021) was an American basketball player who played five seasons in the American Basketball Association (ABA).

Born in Philadelphia, Pennsylvania, he played collegiately for the South Carolina State University.

He was selected by the Philadelphia 76ers in the 7th round (77th pick overall) of the 1967 NBA draft.

He played for the Minnesota Pipers (1968–69), Washington Caps (1969–70), Virginia Squires (1970–71), Carolina Cougars (1970–71) and Denver Rockets (1971–73) in the ABA for 306 games.

Card played for the Allentown Jets of the Eastern Professional Basketball League (EPBL) / Eastern Basketball Association (EBA) from 1966 to 1968 and 1972 to 1974. He won an EPBL championship with the Jets in 1968.

Following his retirement from basketball, Card worked for the Southeastern Pennsylvania Transit Authority for nearly 25 years. He died on April 14, 2021.

== Early life and education ==
Frank Howard Card was born to Catherine Cheers and Frank Card on December 28, 1944, in Philadelphia, PA. Card graduated from West Philadelphia High School and earned a scholarship to South Carolina State University. His passion in life at that time was to play basketball, and growing up he honed his skills on the playgrounds of his West Philly neighborhood.

== Work and career ==
Card served in the Army from April 1965 for three years.

During this time Card started playing for the Baker League, where he became known for his jumping ability and earned the nickname “Watusi”. He went on to be selected by the 76ers in the 7th round of the 1967 NBA draft. He played for the Minnesota Pipers, Washington Caps, Virginia Squires, Carolina Cougars and Denver Rockets. Card also played pro ball in Europe for several years. During that time he also served in the Army from April 1965 to April 1968.

Following his retirement from basketball, Card worked for the Southeastern Pennsylvania Transit Authority (SEPTA) for nearly 25 years.

== Death and legacy ==
Card was known for socializing and making friends. His smile, energy and sense of humor was as big as he was. He mentored many of his younger male coworkers who often called him “Mr. Frank”. He showed respect to everyone he met and felt one of the most important jobs he ever had was being a positive role model and father to his two stepsons.

Card was honored at the ABA's 50th Anniversary for his professional achievements and a proud supporter of the Dropping Dimes Foundation.
