= Marv Roberts =

American basketball player (born 1950)

Personal information
- Born: January 29, 1950 (age 76) Brooklyn, New York, U.S.
- Listed height: 6 ft 8 in (2.03 m)
- Listed weight: 200 lb (91 kg)

Career information
- High school: George W. Wingate (Brooklyn, New York)
- College: Utah State (1968–1971)
- NBA draft: 1971: 3rd round, 45th overall pick
- Drafted by: Detroit Pistons
- Playing career: 1971–1979
- Position: Power forward / center
- Number: 31, 14, 30

Career history
- 1971–1974: Denver Rockets
- 1974: Carolina Cougars
- 1974–1976: Kentucky Colonels
- 1976: Virginia Squires
- 1976–1977: Los Angeles Lakers
- 1978–1979: Sporting Club Gira

Career highlights
- ABA champion (1975); No. 31 retired by Utah State Aggies

Career ABA and NBA statistics
- Points: 3,345 (8.3 ppg)
- Rebounds: 1,570 (3.9 rpg)
- Assists: 517 (1.3 apg)
- Stats at NBA.com
- Stats at Basketball Reference

Marvin Roberts (born January 29, 1950) is an American former basketball player. He played in American Basketball Association (ABA) for five seasons, followed by one season in the National Basketball Association (NBA). He played college basketball for the Utah State Aggies.

== College basketball career ==
Roberts, a native of Brooklyn, New York, was given a scholarship to play at Utah State University after being named to the 1967 All-Brooklyn First Team by the New York Daily News, alongside being named as an All-New York City honorable mention by the New York Post and a "Sleeper of the Year" of New York City from High School Basketball Illustrated (HSBI). He played with the Aggies from 1969 to 1971. He was selected to the All-America team by the Helm's Foundation three times along with being named as an All-American honorable mention by the AP and UPI during those seasons. During his time with the Aggies, he scored 1,844 points, had 997 rebounds (with a 12.8 average per game), and 228 assists. He holds the school record in double-double games with 54, games with double-figure rebounds at 55, with two instances of double-double streaks that rank one and two in school history at 17, and 13, respectively. His highest scoring game was 43, which he did twice. At the time of his induction into the Aggie All Century Basketball Team in 2005, he ranked 3rd in school history in rebounds. He was inducted into the USU Athletics Hall of Fame in 2006.

== Pro basketball career ==
Roberts was drafted by the Detroit Pistons in the third round of the 1971 NBA draft. He signed with the Denver Rockets of the ABA. Roberts played for the Rockets beginning in 1971 and was traded to the Carolina Cougars during the 1973–74 season. Roberts joined the Kentucky Colonels for the 1974–75 season and was part of the Colonels team that won the 1975 ABA Championship. Following Kentucky's championship season Roberts was traded to the Virginia Squires. The Squires folded at the conclusion of the 1975–76 ABA season, just before the ABA–NBA merger. As a result, Roberts ended up with the Los Angeles Lakers for the 1976–77 season.

Roberts scored 3,345 points in his six NBA/ABA seasons.

== Life after Basketball ==
After his professional basketball career Roberts earned a Bachelor of Science degree in Business Administration as well as a Master of Science degree in Career Counseling from California State University, Los Angeles. Roberts then began a corporate career in Human Resources; nine years with the McDonald's Corporation, followed by 17 years with FedEx Freight.

Roberts held the position of Assistant Vice President for Student Engagement and Diversity at Utah State University. He served on several Boards including Utah State University's Foundation, the Logan Regional Hospital and the English Language Center of Cache Valley.

Roberts also served two consecutive, three year terms as a director and the treasurer on the Board of the National Basketball Retired Players Association.

In the summer of 2012, Roberts joined a group of former NBA players on a trip to Israel, sponsored by the American Israel Public Affairs Committee (AIPAC). While there, the group became well informed of the history of the Israeli-Palestinian conflict. Roberts was chosen to represent the group at the AIPAC Summit meeting in which he shared, with a select group AIPAC supporters, the highlights of the group's visit to Israel. He also was invited to attended the AIPAC Policy Conference in Washington, D.C., on separate occasions.

He is currently a volunteer at INROADS, a non-profit organization providing internships at participating corporations for talented, underserved college students. He serves as a facilitator of business case studies and conducts mock interviews for the interns.
