= Dave Robisch =

American basketball player (born 1949)

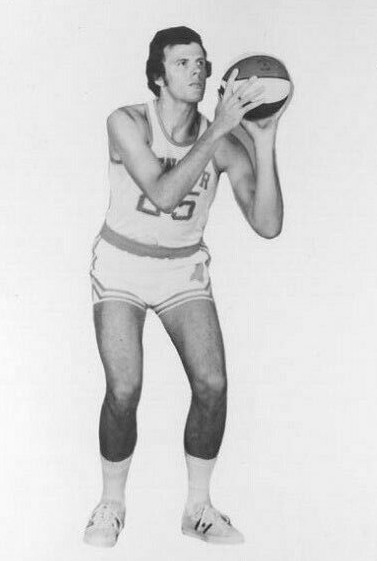
- Robisch, circa 1973

Personal information
- Born: December 22, 1949 (age 76) Cincinnati, Ohio, U.S.
- Listed height: 6 ft 10 in (2.08 m)
- Listed weight: 235 lb (107 kg)

Career information
- High school: Springfield (Springfield, Illinois)
- College: Kansas (1968–1971)
- NBA draft: 1971: 3rd round, 44th overall pick
- Drafted by: Boston Celtics
- Playing career: 1971–1984
- Position: Center / power forward
- Number: 25, 12, 24, 40, 35

Career history
- 1971–1975: Denver Rockets / Nuggets
- 1975: San Diego Sails
- 1975–1977: Indiana Pacers
- 1977–1979: Los Angeles Lakers
- 1979–1980: Cleveland Cavaliers
- 1980–1983: Denver Nuggets
- 1984: San Antonio Spurs
- 1984: Kansas City Kings

Career highlights
- Second-team All-American – AP (1971); Third-team All-American – NABC, UPI (1971); Big Eight Player of the Year (1970); 3× First-team All-Big Eight (1969–1971); No. 40 jersey retired by Kansas Jayhawks

Career ABA and NBA statistics
- Points: 10,581 (11.4 ppg)
- Rebounds: 6,173 (6.6 rpg)
- Assists: 1,655 (1.8 apg)
- Stats at NBA.com
- Stats at Basketball Reference

David George Robisch (born December 22, 1949) is an American former professional basketball player in the American Basketball Association (ABA) and National Basketball Association (NBA). Robisch played at the University of Kansas, where he was initiated into the Sigma Nu fraternity. He was positioned at center and forward for the Denver Rockets / Nuggets (1971–75, 1980–83), Indiana Pacers (1975–77), San Diego Sails (1975), Los Angeles Lakers (1977–79), Cleveland Cavaliers (1979–80), San Antonio Spurs (1983) and Kansas City Kings (1984).

He contributed to the Nuggets' victory in the 1974–75 ABA Western Division.

On October 8, 1975, Robisch was part of one of the more infamous trades in ABA history. The Baltimore Claws, despite financial problems, had obtained the rights to star Dan Issel from the Kentucky Colonels. The Claws were unable to come through with the $500,000 they owed the Colonels for Issel. Under pressure from the league, the Claws traded Issel to the Denver Nuggets in exchange for Robisch and $500,000 (which was used to pay the Kentucky Colonels the money owed for Issel). The Baltimore Claws would soon fold as a franchise before the final ABA season began, which led to his player rights being acquired by the San Diego Sails. However, the Sails would soon fold as a franchise 11 games after rebranding from their previous San Diego Conquistadors name, which led to Robisch's player rights going to the Indiana Pacers for the rest of the season instead.

== Achievements ==
- Ranks 1st on ABA Career Turnover Ratio List (7.9).
- Ranks 9th on ABA Career Blocks Per Game List (.7).
- Ranks 15th on ABA Career Rebound Rate List (14.2).

In 13 seasons he played in 930 games and played 22,780 minutes, having a 46.4% field goal percentage (3,997 for 8,620), a 79.8% free throw percentage (2,587 for 3,241), 6,173 total rebounds (1,992 offensive, 4,181 defensive), 1,656 assists, 986 turnovers, 2,069 personal fouls and 10,581 points.

Robisch is currently an elected official in Springfield, Illinois, serving as a Trustee of Capital Township. His wife, Lou, is an administrator for Sangamon County, and their sons Scott and Brett both played college basketball.

Robisch is a 1967 graduate of Springfield High School.

In 2006, Robisch was voted as one of the 100 Legends of the IHSA Boys Basketball Tournament, a group of former players and coaches in honor of the 100 anniversary of the IHSA boys basketball tournament.
