= List of San Antonio Spurs seasons =

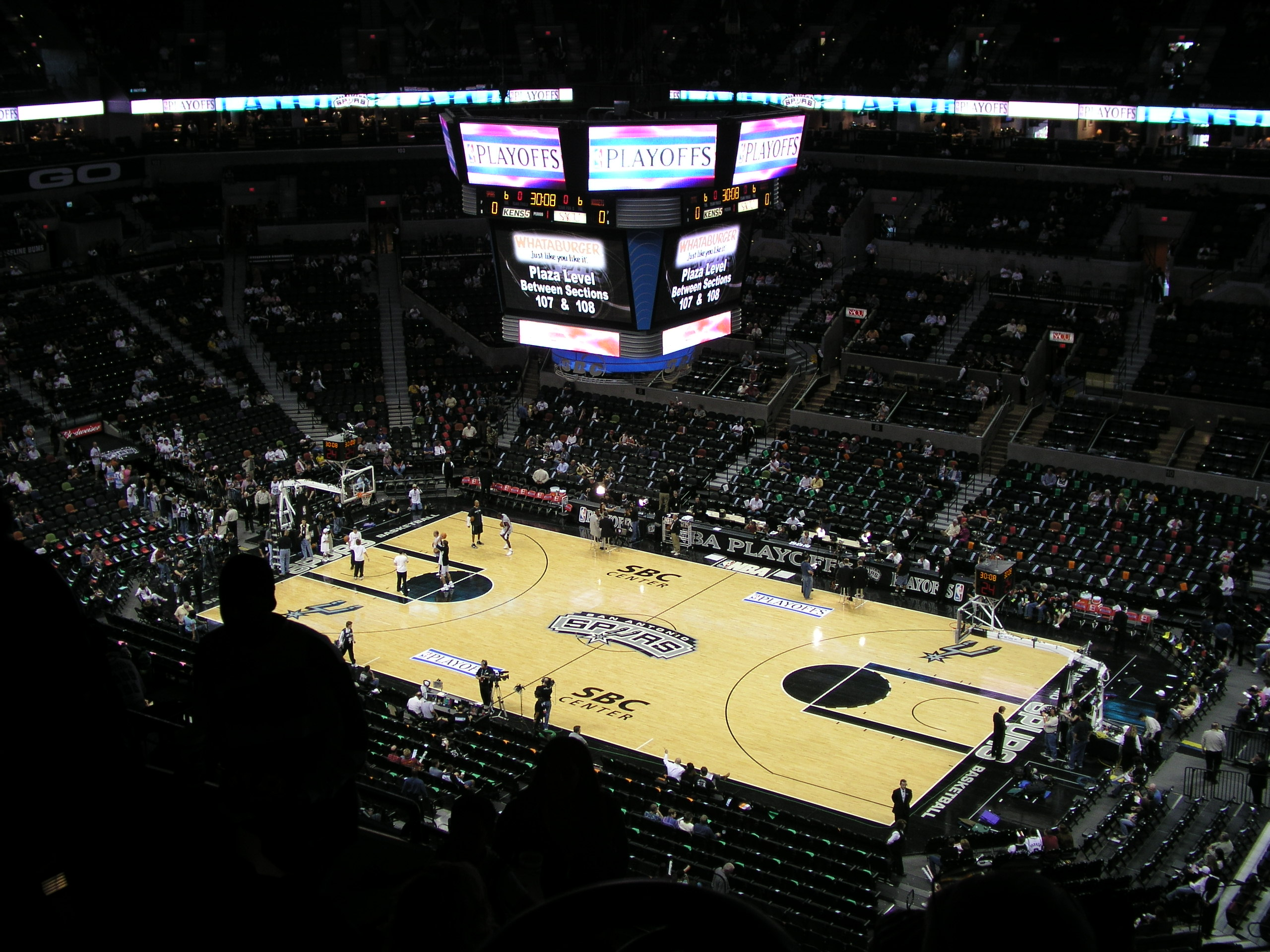
Frost Bank Center (formerly known as the SBC Center and the AT&T Center) has been the home arena of the Spurs since the 2002–03 NBA season.

The San Antonio Spurs are a professional basketball team based in San Antonio, Texas that competes in the National Basketball Association (NBA). In 1967, the franchise was founded in Dallas, Texas as the Dallas Chaparrals—one of the eleven charter franchises of the American Basketball Association (ABA). During the 1970–71 season, in an attempt to make the team a regional one, the franchise renamed itself the Texas Chaparrals; also, some home games were played in Fort Worth and Lubbock. However, low attendance figures prompted the team to return full-time to Dallas the following season. In 1973, the franchise relocated to San Antonio and was renamed the San Antonio Spurs. Three years later, the Spurs were one of four ABA franchises that joined the NBA as a result of the ABA–NBA merger.

In 49 seasons since joining the NBA, the Spurs have achieved a winning record 36 times, have appeared in the NBA playoffs 38 times, and have won five NBA championships. The team won its most recent NBA championship in 2014. The only NBA franchises that have won more championships than the Spurs are the Boston Celtics (18 championships), the Los Angeles Lakers (17), the Golden State Warriors (7), and the Chicago Bulls (6).

As of the end of the 2020–21 season, the Spurs owned the NBA's all-time best win percentage; the team had won 62.2 percent of its games since joining the NBA, placing it ahead of the Minneapolis/Los Angeles Lakers (.593), the Boston Celtics (.590), the Seattle SuperSonics/Oklahoma City Thunder (.541), and the Utah Jazz (.539). The 2017–18 season is the first time the Spurs have won fewer than 50 games in a non-lockout season since the 1996–97 season. This was the longest such streak in the NBA. The 2019–20 season was the first season since 1996–97 in which the Spurs missed the playoffs, an NBA record. The Spurs missed out on the playoffs again the following year, marking the first time in franchise history that the Spurs went consecutive seasons without making the playoffs.

== Table key ==
League champions	Conference champions	Division champions	Playoff berth	Play-in berth

ASG MVP	All-Star Game Most Valuable Player
CIT	J. Walter Kennedy Citizenship Award
COY	Coach of the Year
DPOY	Defensive Player of the Year
EOY	Executive of the Year
FMVP	Finals Most Valuable Player
MIP	Most Improved Player
MVP	Most Valuable Player
ROY	Rookie of the Year
SIX	Sixth Man of the Year
SPOR	Sportsmanship Award

== Seasons ==
Season	League	Conference	Finish	Division	Finish	Wins	Losses	Win%	GB	Playoffs	Awards	Head coach
Dallas Chaparrals
1967–68	ABA	—	—	Western	2nd	46	32	.590	2	Won Division Semifinals (Mavericks) 3–0; Lost Division Finals (Buccaneers) 4–1	—	Cliff Hagan
1968–69	ABA	—	—	Western	4th	41	37	.526	19	Lost Division Semifinals (Buccaneers) 4–3	John Beasley (ASG MVP)	Cliff Hagan
1969–70	ABA	—	—	Western	2nd	45	39	.536	6	Lost Division Semifinals (Stars) 4–2	—	Cliff Hagan; Max Williams
Texas Chaparrals
1970–71	ABA	—	—	Western	4th	30	54	.357	28	Lost Division Semifinals (Stars) 4–0	—	Max Williams; Bill Blakeley
Dallas Chaparrals
1971–72	ABA	—	—	Western	3rd	42	42	.500	18	Lost Division Semifinals (Stars) 4–0	Tom Nissalke (COY)	Tom Nissalke
1972–73	ABA	—	—	Western	5th	28	56	.333	27	—	—	Babe McCarthy; Dave Brown
San Antonio Spurs
1973–74	ABA	—	—	Western	3rd	45	39	.536	6	Lost Division Semifinals (Pacers) 4–3	Swen Nater (ROY); Jack Ankerson (EOY)	Tom Nissalke
1974–75	ABA	—	—	Western	2nd	51	33	.607	14	Lost Division Semifinals (Pacers) 4–2	—	Tom Nissalke; Bob Bass
1975–76	ABA	—	—	— (Note: The league abolished division play during the season.)	3rd	50	34	.595	10	Lost Semifinals (Nets) 4–3	—	Bob Bass
1976–77	NBA	Eastern	5th	Central	3rd	44	38	.537	5	Lost First round (Celtics) 2–0	—	Doug Moe
1977–78	NBA	Eastern	2nd	Central	1st	52	30	.634	—	Lost conference semifinals (Bullets) 4–2	Angelo Drossos (EOY)	Doug Moe
1978–79	NBA	Eastern	2nd	Central	1st	48	34	.585	—	Won conference semifinals (76ers) 4–3; Lost conference finals (Bullets) 4–3	—	Doug Moe
1979–80	NBA	Eastern	5th	Central	3rd	41	41	.500	9	Lost First round (Rockets) 2–1	George Gervin (ASG MVP)	Doug Moe; Bob Bass
1980–81	NBA	Western	2nd	Midwest	1st	52	30	.634	—	Lost conference semifinals (Rockets) 4–3	—	Stan Albeck
1981–82	NBA	Western	2nd	Midwest	1st	48	34	.585	—	Won conference semifinals (SuperSonics) 4–1; Lost conference finals (Lakers) 4–0	—	Stan Albeck
1982–83	NBA	Western	2nd	Midwest	1st	53	29	.646	—	Won conference semifinals (Nuggets) 4–1; Lost conference finals (Lakers) 4–2	—	Stan Albeck
1983–84	NBA	Western	10th	Midwest	5th	37	45	.451	8	—	—	Morris McHone; Bob Bass
1984–85	NBA	Western	7th	Midwest	5th	41	41	.500	11	Lost First round (Nuggets) 3–2	—	Cotton Fitzsimmons
1985–86	NBA	Western	8th	Midwest	6th	35	47	.427	16	Lost First round (Lakers) 3–0	Alvin Robertson (DPOY, MIP)	Cotton Fitzsimmons
1986–87	NBA	Western	11th	Midwest	6th	28	54	.341	27	—	—	Bob Weiss
1987–88	NBA	Western	8th	Midwest	5th	31	51	.378	23	Lost First round (Lakers) 3–0	—	Bob Weiss
1988–89	NBA	Western	12th	Midwest	5th	21	61	.256	30	—	—	Larry Brown
1989–90	NBA	Western	2nd	Midwest	1st	56	26	.683	—	Won First round (Nuggets) 3–0; Lost conference semifinals (Trail Blazers) 4–3	David Robinson (ROY); Bob Bass (EOY)	Larry Brown
1990–91	NBA	Western	2nd	Midwest	1st	55	27	.671	—	Lost First round (Warriors) 3–1	—	Larry Brown
1991–92	NBA	Western	5th	Midwest	2nd	47	35	.573	8	Lost First round (Suns) 3–0	David Robinson (DPOY)	Larry Brown; Bob Bass
1992–93	NBA	Western	5th	Midwest	2nd	49	33	.598	6	Won First round (Trail Blazers) 3–1; Lost conference semifinals (Suns) 4–2	—	Jerry Tarkanian; Rex Hughes; John Lucas II
1993–94	NBA	Western	4th	Midwest	2nd	55	27	.671	3	Lost First round (Jazz) 3–1	—	John Lucas II
1994–95	NBA	Western	1st	Midwest	1st	62	20	.756	—	Won First round (Nuggets) 3–0; Won conference semifinals (Lakers) 4–2; Lost conference finals (Rockets) 4–2	David Robinson (MVP)	Bob Hill
1995–96	NBA	Western	2nd	Midwest	1st	59	23	.720	—	Won First round (Suns) 3–1; Lost conference semifinals (Jazz) 4–2	—	Bob Hill
1996–97	NBA	Western	13th	Midwest	6th	20	62	.244	44	—	—	Bob Hill; Gregg Popovich
1997–98	NBA	Western	5th	Midwest	2nd	56	26	.683	6	Won First round (Suns) 3–1; Lost conference semifinals (Jazz) 4–1	Tim Duncan (ROY); Avery Johnson (SPOR)	Gregg Popovich
1998–99	NBA	Western	1st	Midwest	1st	37	13	.740	—	Won First round (Timberwolves) 3–1; Won conference semifinals (Lakers) 4–0; Won conference finals (Trail Blazers) 4–0; Won NBA Finals (Knicks) 4–1	Tim Duncan (FMVP)	Gregg Popovich
1999–00	NBA	Western	4th	Midwest	2nd	53	29	.646	2	Lost First round (Suns) 3–1	Tim Duncan (ASG MVP)	Gregg Popovich
2000–01	NBA	Western	1st	Midwest	1st	58	24	.707	—	Won First round (Timberwolves) 3–1; Won conference semifinals (Mavericks) 4–1; Lost conference finals (Lakers) 4–0	David Robinson (SPOR)	Gregg Popovich
2001–02	NBA	Western	2nd	Midwest	1st	58	24	.707	—	Won First round (SuperSonics) 3–2; Lost conference semifinals (Lakers) 4–1	Tim Duncan (MVP); Steve Smith (SPOR)	Gregg Popovich
2002–03	NBA	Western	1st	Midwest	1st	60	22	.732	—	Won First round (Suns) 4–2; Won conference semifinals (Lakers) 4–2; Won conference finals (Mavericks) 4–2; Won NBA Finals (Nets) 4–2	Tim Duncan (MVP, FMVP); Gregg Popovich (COY); David Robinson (JWKC)	Gregg Popovich
2003–04	NBA	Western	3rd	Midwest	2nd	57	25	.695	1	Won First round (Grizzlies) 4–0; Lost conference semifinals (Lakers) 4–2	—	Gregg Popovich
2004–05	NBA	Western	2nd	Southwest	1st	59	23	.720	—	Won First round (Nuggets) 4–1; Won conference semifinals (SuperSonics) 4–2; Won conference finals (Suns) 4–1; Won NBA Finals (Pistons) 4–3	Tim Duncan (FMVP)	Gregg Popovich
2005–06	NBA	Western	1st	Southwest	1st	63	19	.768	—	Won First round (Kings) 4–2; Lost conference semifinals (Mavericks) 4–3	—	Gregg Popovich
2006–07	NBA	Western	3rd	Southwest	2nd	58	24	.707	9	Won First round (Nuggets) 4–1; Won conference semifinals (Suns) 4–2; Won conference finals (Jazz) 4–1; Won NBA Finals (Cavaliers) 4–0	Tony Parker (FMVP)	Gregg Popovich
2007–08	NBA	Western	3rd	Southwest	2nd	56	26	.683	—	Won First round (Suns) 4–1; Won conference semifinals (Hornets) 4–3; Lost conference finals (Lakers) 4–1	Manu Ginóbili (SIX)	Gregg Popovich
2008–09	NBA	Western	3rd	Southwest	1st	54	28	.659	—	Lost First round (Mavericks) 4–1	—	Gregg Popovich
2009–10	NBA	Western	7th	Southwest	2nd	50	32	.610	5	Won First round (Mavericks) 4–2; Lost conference semifinals (Suns) 4–0	—	Gregg Popovich
2010–11	NBA	Western	1st	Southwest	1st	61	21	.744	—	Lost First round (Grizzlies) 4–2	—	Gregg Popovich
2011–12	NBA	Western	1st	Southwest	1st	50	16	.758	—	Won First round (Jazz) 4–0; Won conference semifinals (Clippers) 4–0; Lost conference finals (Thunder) 4–2	Gregg Popovich (COY)	Gregg Popovich
2012–13	NBA	Western	2nd	Southwest	1st	58	24	.707	—	Won First round (Lakers) 4–0; Won conference semifinals (Warriors) 4–2; Won conference finals (Grizzlies) 4–0; Lost NBA Finals (Heat) 4–3	—	Gregg Popovich
2013–14	NBA	Western	1st	Southwest	1st	62	20	.756	—	Won First round (Mavericks) 4–3; Won conference semifinals (Trail Blazers) 4–1; Won conference finals (Thunder) 4–2; Won NBA Finals (Heat) 4–1	Kawhi Leonard (FMVP); Gregg Popovich (COY); R.C. Buford (EOY)	Gregg Popovich
2014–15	NBA	Western	6th	Southwest	3rd	55	27	.671	1	Lost First round (Clippers) 4–3	Kawhi Leonard (DPOY)	Gregg Popovich
2015–16	NBA	Western	2nd	Southwest	1st	67	15	.817	—	Won First round (Grizzlies) 4–0; Lost conference semifinals (Thunder) 4–2	Kawhi Leonard (DPOY); R.C. Buford (EOY)	Gregg Popovich
2016–17	NBA	Western	2nd	Southwest	1st	61	21	.744	—	Won First round (Grizzlies) 4–2; Won conference semifinals (Rockets) 4–2; Lost conference finals (Warriors) 4–0	—	Gregg Popovich
2017–18	NBA	Western	7th	Southwest	3rd	47	35	.573	18	Lost First round (Warriors) 4–1	—	Gregg Popovich
2018–19	NBA	Western	7th	Southwest	2nd	48	34	.585	5	Lost First round (Nuggets) 4–3	—	Gregg Popovich
2019–20	NBA	Western	11th	Southwest	4th	32	39	.451	12	—	—	Gregg Popovich
2020–21	NBA	Western	10th	Southwest	3rd	33	39	.458	19	—	—	Gregg Popovich
2021–22	NBA	Western	10th	Southwest	4th	34	48	.415	30	—	—	Gregg Popovich
2022–23	NBA	Western	15th	Southwest	5th	22	60	.268	31	—	—	Gregg Popovich
2023–24	NBA	Western	14th	Southwest	5th	22	60	.268	28	—	Victor Wembanyama (ROY)	Gregg Popovich
2024–25	NBA	Western	13th	Southwest	4th	34	48	.415	18	—	Stephon Castle (ROY)	Gregg Popovich; Mitch Johnson
2025–26	NBA	Western	2nd	Southwest	1st	62	20	.756	—	Won First round (Trail Blazers) 4–1; Won conference semifinals (Timberwolves) 4–2; Won conference finals (Thunder) 4–3; Lost NBA Finals (Knicks) 4–1	Victor Wembanyama (DPOY); Keldon Johnson (SIX)	Mitch Johnson

== Statistics ==
Statistics are correct as of the end of the 2025–26 season.

	Regular season			Playoffs			Total		
	Wins	Losses	Win%	Wins	Losses	Win%	Wins	Losses	Win%
Dallas/Texas Chaparrals ABA record (1967–1973)	232	260	.472	9	20	.310	241	280	.463
San Antonio Spurs ABA record (1973–1976)	146	106	.579	8	12	.400	154	118	.566
All-time ABA record	378	366	.508	17	32	.347	395	398	.498
San Antonio Spurs NBA record (1976–present)	2,401	1,630	.596	222	181	.551	2,623	1,811	.592
All-time franchise record	2,779	1,996	.582	252	223	.531	3,031	2,219	.577
