= List of American Basketball Association broadcasters =

In early-1970s, the CBS television network aired American Basketball Association (ABA) games, specifically league's annual All-Star Game/selected playoff games. Pat Summerall served as the CBS analyst on some ABA games alongside Don Criqui on play-by-play. Game 5 of the 1970 ABA Finals (Indiana vs. Los Angeles) was nationally televised by CBS on Saturday, May 23 at 3 p.m Eastern Time. The broadcast, however, was blacked out within the state of Indiana. After that league's 1972-73 season, CBS lost its TV airing rights as they started airing National Basketball Association (NBA) games in its 1973-74 season onward.

The 1973 ABA All-Star Game was a syndicated telecast with Andy Musser and Alex Hannum providing the play–by–play and color commentary respectively.

For the 1973–74 season, the ABA signed a television contract with the Hughes Television Network. The first game under Hughes' contract was the 1974 ABA All-Star Game on January 30. Ray Scott and Wilt Chamberlain provided the play–by–play and color commentary for the All-Star Game respectively.

Had there been a seventh game of the 1975-76 season's championship playoff series, it would havve been televised by NBC because that network signed a contract to air a potential seventh game on Sunday, which would have been on May 16, 1976. However, since the final ABA Finals the league ever did ultimately ended in six games, with the New York Nets triumphing over the Denver Nuggets in what would become the ABA's final game of its nine year existence, NBC's contract was ultimately considered voided by that time.

== 1960s ==
=== 1967–68 ===
Local broadcasters for the 1967–68 ABA season
Team	Radio	Radio announcers	Television	Television announcers
Anaheim	KEZY		KTTV	Dick Schad
Dallas	KRLD	Terry Stembridge		
Denver	KTLN	Dick Carlson	KWGN-TV	
Houston	KXYZ	Gary DeLaune		
Indiana	WIRE	Jerry Baker	WLWI	Brian Madden
Kentucky	WAVE		WLKY	Charlie Mastin
Minnesota	WLOL	Rod Trongard		
New Jersey	WJRZ-FM	Spencer Ross		
New Orleans	WDSU		WWOM-TV (Note: Game 7 championship series only.)	
Oakland	KPAT	Chuck Hinkle and Rick Barry		
Pittsburgh	WEEP	Jack Fleming		

When the American Basketball Association began play in 1967, Terry Stembridge broadcast the Dallas Chaparrals games on radio. Stembridge continued as the team's announcer after it became the San Antonio Spurs and when the Spurs moved into the NBA as part of the ABA-NBA merger. Stembridge broadcast 1,252 consecutive Chaparrals/Spurs games and served as their announcer for fifteen years.

=== 1968–69 ===
Local broadcasters for the 1968–69 ABA season
Team	Radio	Radio announcers	Television	Television announcers
Dallas	KRLD	Terry Stembridge	KDTV 39	Frank Filesi
Denver	KTLN	Bob Martin and Dick Carlson		
Houston				
Indiana	WIRE	Jerry Baker	WLWI	Brian Madden
Kentucky	WHAS		WLKY	Ed Kallay
Los Angeles	KBIG	Bob Rhodes	KTTV	Chuck Benedict
Miami	WOCN	Dick Kumble		
Minnesota	KSTP	Rod Trongard	WTCN-TV	Ray Scott
New York	WBAB	Spencer Ross		
New Orleans	WDSU		WYES-TV (Note: Opener only.); WWOM-TV	Bruce Miller and Lynn Cole
Oakland	KEEN (Note: Playoffs only.)		KEMO-TV	Hal Peterson

=== 1969–70 ===
Local broadcasters for the 1969–70 ABA season
Team	Radio	Radio announcers	Television	Television announcers
Carolina	WSOC	Bill Currie and Bob Lamey		
Dallas	KRLD	Terry Stembridge		
Denver	KOA	Bob Martin and Dick Carlson	KOA-TV	
Indiana	WIRE	Jerry Baker	WLWI	Don Hein
Kentucky	WAVE	Ed Kallay and Joe Knight	WLKY (Note: Away games in semifinals.)	
Los Angeles	XERB	Sam Balter		
Miami	WGBS	Bob Martin		
New Orleans	WDSU	Bruce Miller and Lynn Cole		
New York	WGBB	Spencer Ross		
Pittsburgh				
Washington			WTTG (Note: Opening day only.)	Maury Povich and Sam Jones

WGBS broadcast the Miami Floridians of the American Basketball Association for three of their four seasons of existence, taking over from WOCN (1450 AM) in 1969.

During the New York Nets' ABA years, announcers included Marty Glickman, Marv Albert's brothers Al Albert and Steve Albert, baseball Hall of Fame pitcher Bob Gibson, Bob Goldsholl, as well as John Sterling and Mike DiTomasso. The latter two joined the club's move into the NBA.

WDCA 20 continued to promote itself as a sports station, with plans to air 10 games of the Washington Caps of the American Basketball Association in the 1969–70 season and serving as the originating station for Baltimore Bullets basketball even though the team had not yet moved to Washington. However, that contract would be terminated before Christmas.

The Carolina Cougars announced ambitious plans to broadcast games across the state, but abandoned that plan after repeated technical difficulties at the originating station in Charlotte forced the issue.

== 1970s ==
=== 1970-71 ===
Local broadcasters for the 1970–71 ABA season
Team	Radio	Radio announcers	Television	Television announcers
Carolina	WSOC		WSJS-TV; WTVD; WRET	Bill Currie and Bob Lamey
Denver	KOA	Bob Martin, Dick Carlson, and Bob Rubin		
Floridians	WGBS		WAJA; WTOG	Bob Martin
Indiana	WIRE	Jerry Baker	WLWI	
Kentucky	WHAS	Cawood Ledford and Van Vance	WLKY	Larry Goodridge
Memphis	WREC	Dick Palmer		
New York	WGBB; WGLI		WPIX	Marty Glickman
Pittsburgh				
Texas	KRLD	Terry Stembridge		
Utah	KALL	Bill Howard	KUTV	Bill Howard
Virginia	WTAR		WAVY-TV	Marty Brennaman

WHAS was the original radio home to locally produced coverage of American Basketball Association games involving the Kentucky Colonels during that league's 1967–1976 existence.

Van Vance appeared on WHAS radio as the announcer for the Kentucky Colonels of the American Basketball Association, often with Cawood Ledford. After the Colonels folded as part of the ABA-NBA merger in June 1976, Vance was best known for broadcasting University of Louisville basketball games (including the 1986 NCAA National Championship Team) on the same station. Vance worked on the air for WHAS from 1957 through 1999.

=== 1971–72 ===
Local broadcasters for the 1971–72 ABA season
Team	Radio	Radio announcers	Television	Television announcers
Carolina	WSOC	Bob Lamey and Bones McKinney	WSJS-TV	Gene Overby
Dallas	WRR	Terry Stembridge	KDTV	Terry Stembridge and Brad Sham
Denver	KOA	Bob Martin, Bob Rubin and Larry Zimmer	KOA-TV	Bob Rubin
Floridians	WGBS		WCIX	Sammy Smith
Indiana	WIRE	Jerry Baker	WLWI	Don Hein
Kentucky	WHAS	Van Vance	WLKY	Howard Hoffman, Alex Groza and Bud Olsen
Memphis	WREC	Dick Palmer	WMC-TV	Terry Lee
New York	WHN	Al Albert	WPIX; Teleprompter Cable (Note: Home games, championship series only.)	Marty Glickman and Bob Gibson; Bob Lawrence
Pittsburgh	WEEP	Dick Overdorf		
Utah	KALL	Bill Howard	KUTV	Bill Marcroft
Virginia	WTAR	Marty Brennaman	WAVY-TV	Bud Kaatz

Marty Glickman joined the radio station WHN in 1939 and was its sports director by 1943. Glickman was also the first announcer for the New York Nets before the ABA-NBA merger, when they played in their first home, the Island Garden in Nassau County. Many feel he became the voice of the New York Nets as a favor to Lou Carnesecca, who left a successful stint as the basketball coach of St. John's University to be the first coach of the New York Nets.

=== 1972–73 ===
Local broadcasters for the 1972–73 ABA season
Team	Radio	Radio announcers	Television	Television announcers
Carolina	WSOC	Bob Lamey	WSJS-TV	Gene Overby and Bob Lamey
Dallas	WRR	Terry Stembridge	KDTV	Terry Stembridge and Verne Lundquist
Denver	KOA	Larry Zimmer		
Indiana	WIBC	Joe McConnell	WLWI	Don Hein
Kentucky	WHAS	Van Vance and Cawood Ledford	WLKY	Howard Hoffman
Memphis	WREC	Dick Palmer		
New York	WHN	Al Albert and Bill Mazer	WOR-TV	Al Albert
San Diego	KOGO	Frank Sims		
Utah	KALL	Bill Howard	KUTV	Bill Marcroft
Virginia	WTAR		WTAR-TV	Marty Brennaman

=== 1973–74 ===
Local broadcasters for the 1973–74 ABA season
Team	Radio	Radio announcers	Television	Television announcers
Carolina	WSOC; WBIG; WPTF	Bob Lamey	WCCB; WXII-TV; WRAL-TV	Dave Stockton and Mike Lewis
Denver	KOA	Larry Zimmer	KWGN-TV	
Indiana	WIBC	Joe McConnell	WLWI	
Kentucky	WHAS	Van Vance	WLKY	Dave Conrad and John Dromo
Memphis	WREC	Dick Palmer		
New York	WHN	Al Albert and Bill Mazer	WOR-TV	Andy Musser and Bob Goldsholl
San Antonio	KKYX	Terry Stembridge	WOAI-TV	Terry Stembridge and Brad Sham
San Diego	KOGO	Frank Sims		
Utah	KALL	Bill Howard	KUTV	
Virginia	WTAR		WAVY-TV	

=== 1974–75 ===
Local broadcasters for the 1974–75 ABA season
Team	Radio	Radio announcers	Television	Television announcers
Denver	KHOW	Mike Wolfe		
Indiana	WIBC	Joe McConnell	WTTV	Jerry Baker
Kentucky	WHAS	Van Vance	WHAS-TV	Van Vance
Memphis	WLOK	Dick Palmer		
New York	WMCA	Dom Valentino and Mike DiTomasso	WOR-TV	Al Albert and Bob Goldsholl
St. Louis	KMOX	Bob Costas and Bill Wilkinson (Note: Home games only.)	KPLR-TV	
San Antonio	KKYX	Terry Stembridge and Gary DeLaune	WOAI-TV	Terry Stembridge and Steve Grad
San Diego	KOGO	Frank Sims		
Utah	KALL	Bill Howard		
Virginia	WTAR	Warner Fusselle	WAVY-TV	Dave Sullivan and Bobi Boecker

WTTV served as the television flagship for the Indiana Pacers from the team's days in the original American Basketball Association (except in 1984–85, when those rights were held by present-day sister station WXIN due to Pacers owner Melvin Simon's part-ownership of the station) to 2006. WTTV lost the rights to the Pacers telecasts after the 2005–06 season, when the NBA team moved their local game telecasts to Fox Sports Indiana.

After leaving school in 1974, Bob Costas joined KMOX radio in St. Louis. He covered games of the American Basketball Association (ABA). Costas would call Missouri Tigers basketball and co-host KMOX's Open Line call-in program.

=== 1975–76 ===
Local broadcasters for the 1975–76 ABA season
Team	Radio	Radio announcers	Television	Television announcers
Denver	KOA	Al Albert and Bob Martin	KWGN-TV	Al Albert and Tom Jorgensen
Indiana	WIBC	Joe McConnell	WTTV	Jerry Baker
Kentucky	WHAS	Van Vance	WHAS-TV	Van Vance
New York	WMCA	John Sterling and Mike DiTomasso	WOR-TV	Steve Albert and Bob Goldsholl
St. Louis	WIL	Bob Costas	KPLR-TV	Bob Costas and Arlene Wellman
San Antonio	WOAI	Terry Stembridge and Gary DeLaune	KMOL-TV	Terry Stembridge and Steve Grad
San Diego	KSDO	Ralph Lawler		
Utah	KALL	Jack Briggs	KSL-TV	Jack Briggs
Virginia	WTAR	Warner Fusselle		

During the mid-1970s, HBO aired several basketball games from the National Basketball Association and the American Basketball Association (notably, the last ABA Finals game in 1976, prior to the latter league's merger with the NBA, between the New York Nets and the Denver Nuggets).

In 1976, CBS sought to establish a postseason playoff between the ABA and NBA, and to win the rights to broadcast those games.

== Following the ABA–NBA merger ==
In June 1976, the remaining ABA owners agreed to a merger with the National Basketball Association, in return for the Spirits of St. Louis folding, to pay the St. Louis owners $2.2 million in cash up front in addition to a 1/7 share of the four remaining teams' television revenues in perpetuity. As the NBA's popularity exploded in the 1980s and 1990s, the league's television rights were sold to CBS and then NBC, and additional deals were struck with the TNT and TBS cable networks; league television revenue soared into the hundreds of millions of dollars. Ozzie and Daniel Silna continued to receive millions of dollars in television revenue from the NBA until reaching a revised agreement in April 2014, which included a $500 million payment to the Silnas from the four former ABA teams.

The NBA imposed one of the following terms on the four ABA refugees—the Denver Nuggets, Indiana Pacers, New York Nets and San Antonio Spurs:

- The four ABA teams would receive no television money at all during their first three seasons in the NBA (1976–1979), and were to pay one seventh of their annual television revenues after that to the owners of the defunct Spirits of St. Louis in perpetuity.

During the 1976–77 season, the NBA's first after the ABA–NBA merger brought the American Basketball Association into the league, CBS held a slam dunk contest that ran during halftime of the Game of the Week telecasts. Don Criqui was the host of this particular competition. The final, which pitted Larry McNeill of the Golden State Warriors against eventual winner Darnell "Dr. Dunk" Hillman of the Indiana Pacers, took place during Game 6 of the 1977 NBA Finals. At the time of the final, Hillman's rights had been traded to the New York Nets, but he had not yet signed a contract. Since he was not officially a member of any NBA team, instead of wearing a jersey, he competed in a plain white tank top. Then for the post-competition interview, Hillman donned a shirt with the words "Bottle Shoppe" – the name of an Indianapolis liquor store, which is still in existence, and was the sponsor of a city parks softball league team for which Hillman played left field (and the only team he was a member of at the time). Other players to compete in the slam dunk tournament included Julius Erving, George Gervin, Kareem Abdul-Jabbar and Moses Malone. CBS, anxious for star power, also gave David Thompson the opportunity to be eliminated three times.

== See also ==
- List of historical NBA over-the-air television broadcasters
- List of Brooklyn Nets broadcasters
- List of Indiana Pacers broadcasters
