= List of San Antonio Spurs head coaches =

The San Antonio Spurs are an American professional basketball team based in San Antonio. They are a member of the Southwest Division of the Western Conference in the National Basketball Association (NBA). The franchise was founded as the Dallas Chaparrals of the American Basketball Association (ABA) in 1967. The team suffered from poor attendance and general disinterest by fans in Dallas, and the name "Dallas" was dropped in favor of "Texas" during the 1970–71 season in an attempt to make the team regional. This also proved to be a failure, and the team returned full-time to use "Dallas" for the 1971–72 season. The team was put up for sale after missing the playoffs in the 1972–73 season. The team was acquired by a group of 36 San Antonio businessmen, led by Angelo Drossos and Red McCombs, who relocated the team to San Antonio, Texas and renamed it to Spurs. In 1976, the ABA folded, threatening the future of San Antonio's sole professional sports franchise. The NBA, however, decided to admit four ABA teams into the league, including the Spurs, along with the Denver Nuggets, the Indiana Pacers and the New York Nets.

There have been 18 head coaches for the San Antonio Spurs. The franchise won their first NBA championship in 1999 coached by Gregg Popovich. The Spurs won four additional NBA championships in 2003, 2005, 2007 and 2014 under Popovich. Popovich is the franchise's all-time leader in both regular season and playoff games coached and wins. He also won the NBA Coach of the Year award in 2003, 2012, and 2014. Larry Brown, Jerry Tarkanian, and Popovich are the only members of the franchise that have been inducted into the Basketball Hall of Fame as a coach. Bob Bass, who has coached with the Spurs for four terms, leads the franchise in most terms coached. Cliff Hagan, Max Williams, Bill Blakeley, Dave Brown, Morris McHone, Tarkanian and Popovich spent their entire coaching careers with the Spurs.

== Key ==
GC	Games coached
W	Wins
L	Losses
Win%	Winning percentage
#	Number of coaches^{[a]}
*	Spent entire NBA head coaching career with the Spurs
†	Elected to the Basketball Hall of Fame as a coach
*†	Elected to the Basketball Hall of Fame as a coach and spent entire NBA head coaching career with the Spurs

== Coaches ==
Note: Statistics are correct through the end of the 2025–26 season.

#	Name	Term^{[b]}	GC	W	L	Win%	GC	W	L	Win%	Achievements	Reference
#	Name	Term^{[b]}	Regular season				Playoffs				Achievements	Reference
Dallas/Texas Chaparrals
1	Cliff Hagan*	1967–1970	199	109	90	.548	15	7	8	.467		
2	Max Williams*	1970	60	28	32	.467	6	2	4	.333		
3	Bill Blakeley*	1970–1971	65	25	40	.385	4	0	4	.000		
4	Tom Nissalke	1971–1972	84	42	42	.500	4	0	4	.000		
5	Babe McCarthy	1972–1973	72	24	48	.333	—	—	—	—		
6	Dave Brown*	1973	12	4	8	.333	—	—	—	—		
San Antonio Spurs
—	Tom Nissalke	1973–1974	112	63	49	.563	7	3	4	.428		
7	Bob Bass	1974–1976	140	83	57	.593	13	5	8	.385		
8	Doug Moe	1976–1980	312	177	135	.567	22	9	13	.409		
—	Bob Bass	1980	16	8	8	.500	3	1	2	.333		
9	Stan Albeck	1980–1983	246	153	93	.622	27	13	14	.481		
10	Morris McHone*	1983	31	11	20	.355	—	—	—	—		
—	Bob Bass	1983–1984	51	26	25	.510	—	—	—	—		
11	Cotton Fitzsimmons	1984–1986	164	76	88	.463	8	2	6	.250		
12	Bob Weiss	1986–1988	164	59	105	.360	3	0	3	.000		
13	Larry Brown†	1988–1992	284	153	131	.539	14	7	7	.500		
—	Bob Bass	1992	44	26	18	.591	3	0	3	.000		
14	Jerry Tarkanian*†	1992	20	9	11	.450	—	—	—	—		
15	Rex Hughes	1992	1	1	0	1.000	—	—	—	—		
16	John Lucas II	1992–1994	143	94	49	.657	14	6	8	.428		
17	Bob Hill	1994–1996	182	124	58	.681	25	14	11	.560		
18	Gregg Popovich*†	1996–2025	2,214	1,390	824	.628	284	170	114	.599	2002–03, 2011–12, 2013–14 NBA Coach of the Year; 5 championships (1999, 2003, 2005, 2007, 2014)	
19	Mitch Johnson*	2025–present	159	94	65	.591	23	13	10	.565		

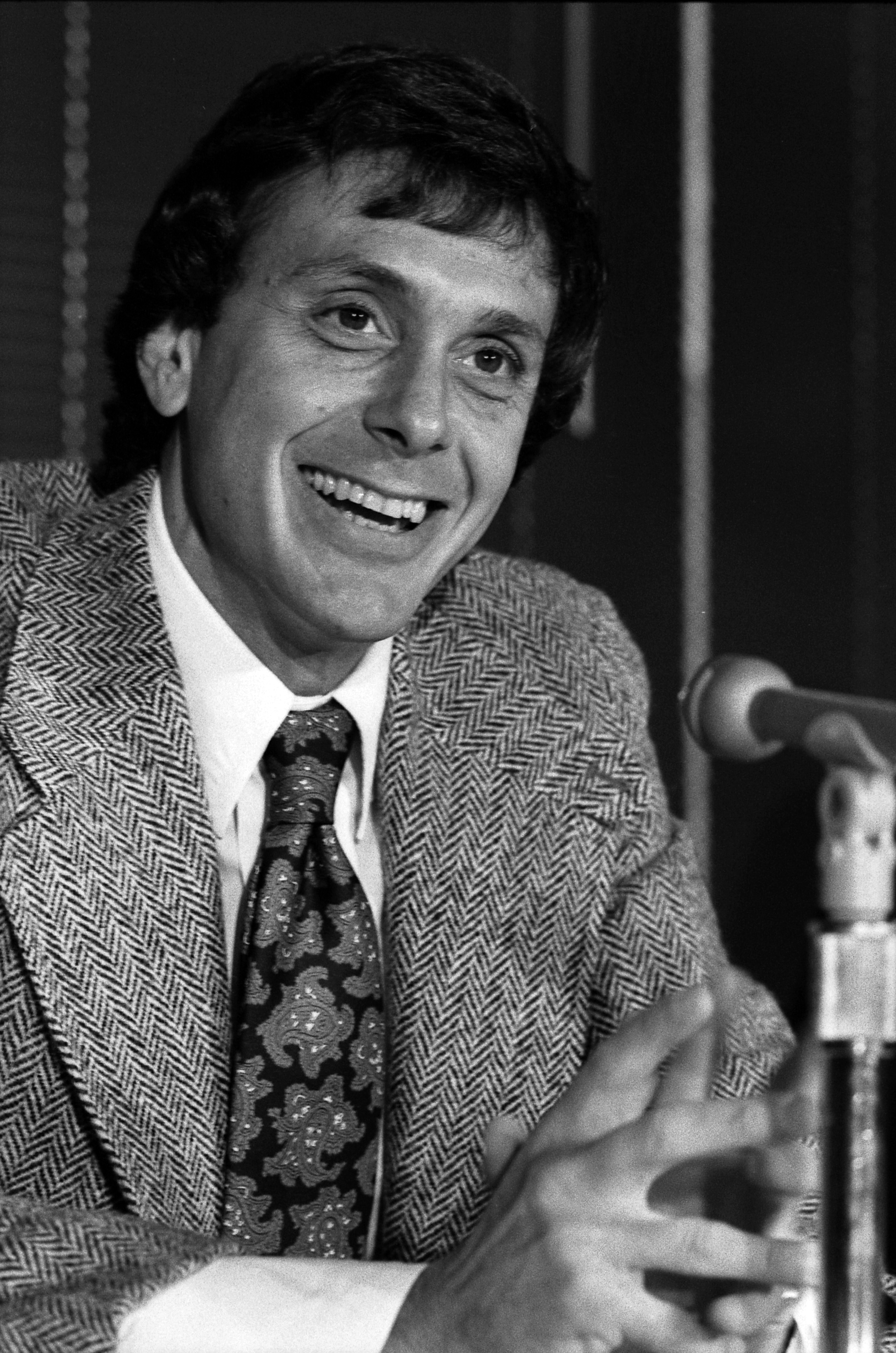
Larry Brown was the Spurs head coach from 1988 to 1992.

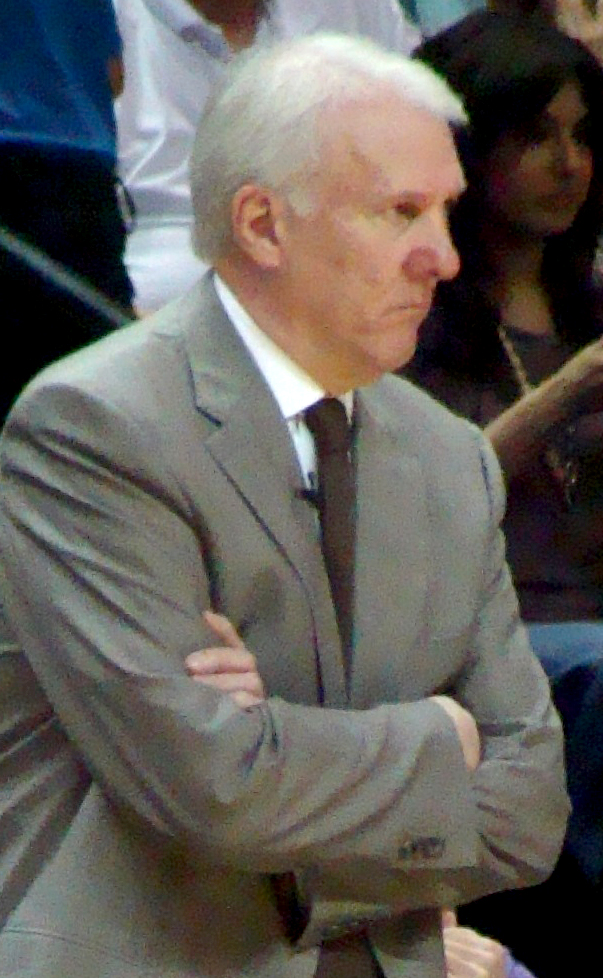
Gregg Popovich was the Spurs head coach from 1996 to 2025.

== Notes ==
- ^{a} A running total of the number of coaches of the Chaparrals/Spurs. Thus, any coach who has two or more separate terms as head coach is only counted once.
- ^{b} Each year is linked to an article about that particular NBA season, except for the seasons spent in the ABA.
