= Spurs seasons =

Spurs seasons may refer to:

- List of San Antonio Spurs seasons
- List of Tottenham Hotspur F.C. seasons
