= Manny Leaks =

American basketball player (born 1945)

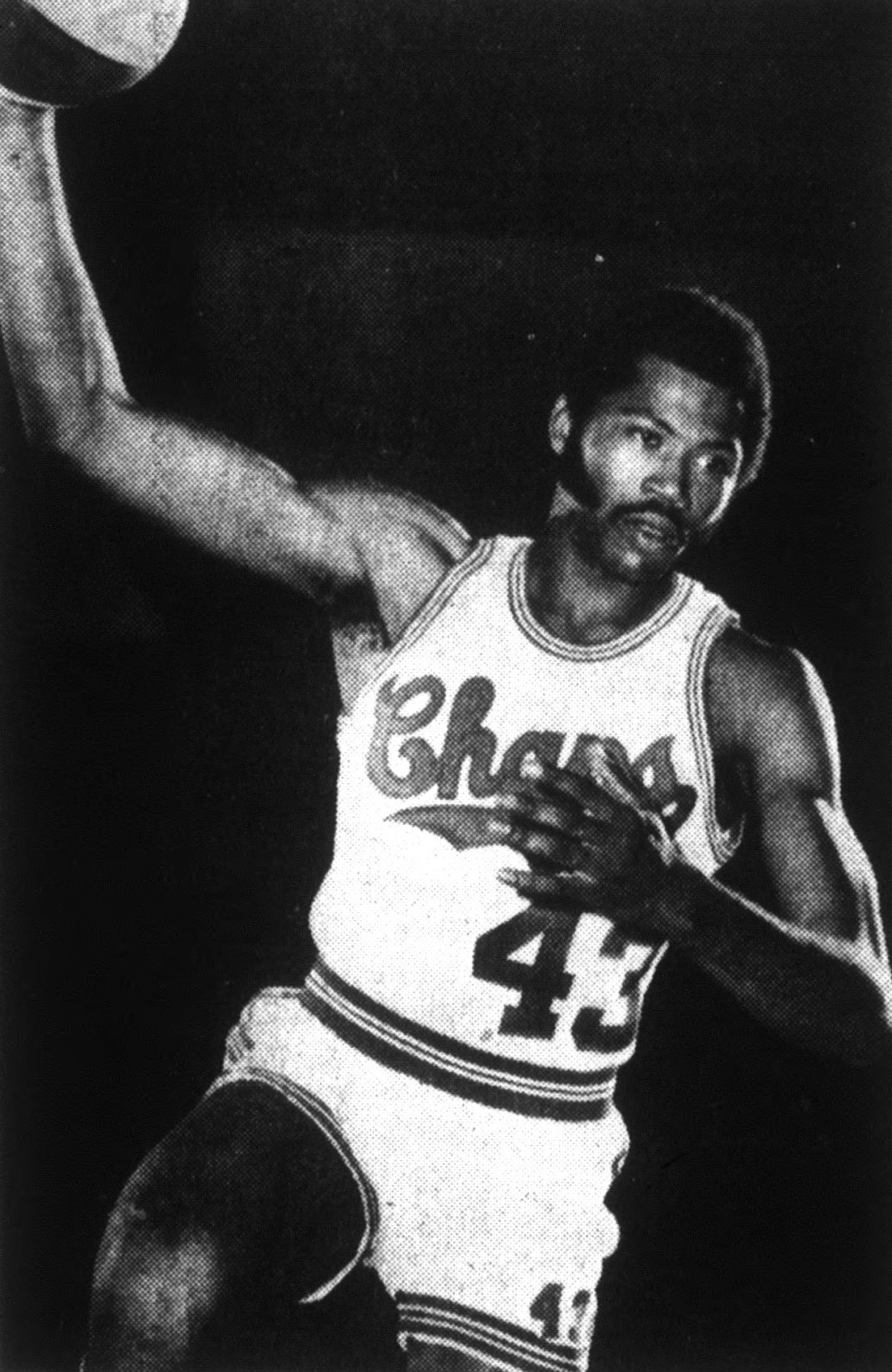
- Leaks, circa 1971

Personal information
- Born: November 27, 1945 (age 80) Cleveland, Ohio, U.S.
- Listed height: 6 ft 8 in (2.03 m)
- Listed weight: 225 lb (102 kg)

Career information
- High school: East (Cleveland, Ohio)
- College: Niagara (1965–1968)
- NBA draft: 1968: 2nd round, 20th overall pick
- Drafted by: Detroit Pistons
- Playing career: 1968–1974
- Position: Power forward / center
- Number: 42, 9, 43, 3, 35, 26, 24

Career history
- 1968–1969: Kentucky Colonels
- 1968–1969: New York Nets
- 1969–1971: Dallas / Texas Chaparrals
- 1971: New York Nets
- 1971–1972: Utah Stars
- 1972: The Floridians
- 1972–1973: Philadelphia 76ers
- 1973–1974: Capital Bullets

Career highlights
- Fourth-team Parade All-American (1964)

Career ABA and NBA statistics
- Points: 5,302 (11.9 ppg)
- Rebounds: 3,998 (9.0 rpg)
- Assists: 471 (1.1 apg)
- Stats at NBA.com
- Stats at Basketball Reference

Emanuel Leaks Jr. (born November 27, 1945) is an American former professional basketball player who played in the American Basketball Association (ABA) and the National Basketball Association (NBA). Leaks was a 6 ft 8 in (2.03 m) forward/center who played at Niagara University from 1965 to 1968. He averaged 17.3 points and 15.1 rebounds per game over his collegiate career.

== Early life ==
Leaks was born on November 27, 1945, in Cleveland, Ohio, to Emanuel Sr. and Sadie Leaks. He was one of four children, with three older sisters. Although the family had little money, all four children graduated from college.

Leaks started playing basketball at 13 years old, having grown to over 5 ft 10 in tall (1.78 m). He attended East High School, and was a star on its basketball team under coach Chuck Lyons. Leaks had to choose between two high schools, and he selected East because of Lyons' persuasiveness and because as a majority white school he would have access to newer books. After a poor performance and demotion by Lyons as a sophomore, Leaks began working assiduously to improve his skills, and played with added defensive intensity during games to prove himself. By the time he was a senior, East was the championship team in Cleveland and he led East to the state finals. Leaks was named an All-State center, and was a national All-American high school selection. The Cleveland Plain Dealer named him as tied for 5th on its 10-player 1960s All-Decade high school team.

== College career ==
Leaks attended Niagara University, and was a 6 ft 8 in (2.03 m) forward/center on the school's varsity basketball team from 1965 to 1968. As a sophomore, he led the team in scoring (17.1 point per game) and rebounding (15.8 rebounds per game). Leaks again led the team in both categories as a junior, with 16.5 points per game and 14 rebounds per game. As a senior, his teammates included future Naismith Memorial Basketball Hall of Fame guard Calvin Murphy. Leaks again led the team in rebounding (16 rebounds per game) and his 17.1 points per game scoring average was second to Murphy's 38.2 points per game.

He averaged 17.3 points and 15.1 rebounds per game over his collegiate career. His rebounds per game average as a senior and sophomore are the top two averages in Niagara basketball history. Leaks scored 24 points and pulled down 30 rebounds in a 1966 game against Syracuse University, playing against future Naismith Hall of Fame guard Dave Bing who had 27 points and 16 rebounds in the Syracuse win. In early January 1967, he was named to the Eastern Collegiate Athletic Association's Weekly All-East Division I Basketball Team. He was in the NCAA's top-20 in total rebounds as a junior and senior, and was 10th in rebounds per game as a sophomore, 12th as a junior and 11th as a senior.

While at Niagara, Leaks raised issues of racial discrimination in the administration and some of the student body.

== Professional career ==
=== ABA ===
Leaks was selected by the Detroit Pistons in the second round of the 1968 NBA draft, with the 20th overall pick. He was taken in the eighth round of the 1968 ABA draft by the Kentucky Colonels, and chose to play for the Colonels. As a rookie, he played in 31 games for the Colonels, averaging 7.2 points and 7.5 rebounds in almost 22 minutes per game. At the end of December 1968, he was traded along with Randy Mahaffey to the New Jersey Nets for Dan Anderson and Oliver Darden.

Leaks became the Nets starting center, averaging 12.5 points and 14.2 rebounds in nearly 36 minutes per game. However, he only played 20 games for the Nets before being traded to the Dallas/Texas Chaparrals in mid-February 1969 for a fourth-round draft choice. In 27 games for the Chaparrals, he averaged 10.6 points and 9.1 rebounds in 26 minutes per game. Overall, playing 78 games for three teams in his rookie year, he averaged 9.7 points and 9.8 rebounds in nearly 27 minutes per game.

Leaks played the entire 1969-70 season with the Chaparrals. As the starting center, he averaged 18.8 points and 12.5 rebounds in nearly 37 minutes per game. The team finished 45–39, second in the ABA's Western Division. Leaks was tied for 14th in the ABA's Most Valuable Player voting. He played 40 games for the Chaparrals in the 1970-71 season, averaging 15.5 points and 11.8 rebounds in nearly 30 minutes per game at center, when he was traded back to the Nets in early February 1971 for Levern Tart and Ed Johnson. He then played in 40 games for the Nets, averaging 17 points and 9.6 rebounds in nearly 36 minutes per game. On the season, in nearly 33 minutes per game, he averaged a double-double in points (16.2) and rebounds (10.7).

In the 1971-72 season, he again played for three different ABA teams, the Nets (nine games), the Utah Stars (42 games), and The Floridians (18 games). In early November 1971, the Stars traded a high draft choice and cash to the Nets for Leaks. Leaks played in a reserve center role behind future Naismith Hall of Fame center Zelmo Beatty. In late January 1972, the Floridians traded their leading rebounder, Ira Harge, to the Stars for Leaks, Rick Fisher and two draft choices. He started 18 games at center for the Floridians, averaging over 40 minutes, 15.4 points and 9.8 rebounds per game.

The 1971-72 season was his last in the ABA. He averaged 13.5 points and 9.9 rebounds per game during his four-year ABA career, which ended in the wake of salary disputes with the Floridians, and the team folding after the season ended. No other ABA team signed Leaks.

=== NBA ===
Leaks decided to join the Philadelphia 76ers for the 1972-73 season, after being approached by his hometown Cleveland Cavaliers. This 76ers team had a 9–73 record and is generally considered the worst team in NBA history. Leaks started over 60 games at center and averaged nearly 31 minutes per game that year. He averaged 11 points and 8.3 rebounds per game. In possibly his best game of the year, Leaks had 20 points, 13 rebounds and five blocked shots, while holding future Hall of Famer Elvin Hayes to nine points defensively. This was in a rare 76ers victory, against the Baltimore Bullets on February 28, 1973. He also blocked two of Kareem Abdul-Jabbar's shots in a single game that year, including a hook shot.

Leaks began the 1973 season in the 76ers training camp as a free agent signing, only one of four players returning from the 1972-73 team. However, the new 76ers coach Gene Shue cut Leaks. Leaks joined Shue's old team, now the Capital Bullets, where he played 53 games, behind Hayes and future Hall of Fame center Wes Unseld. This was his last year in professional basketball.

In his two NBA seasons, Leaks averaged 8.3 points and 6.8 rebounds per game.

== Honors ==
In 1976, he was inducted into the Niagara University Athletics Hall of Honor.

He is a member of the Sports Legends of Cleveland Hall of Fame.

== Personal life ==
After retiring from basketball, Leaks obtained a Master's Degree in Social Work from Case Western Reserve University. He also worked in public relations and in the Cleveland community. Leaks was successfully treated for cancer in 2002. He has served as vice president of the Cleveland chapter of the National Basketball Retired Players Association.

== Career statistics ==
Legend
GP	Games played	GS	Games started	MPG	Minutes per game
FG%	Field goal percentage	3P%	3-point field goal percentage	FT%	Free throw percentage
RPG	Rebounds per game	APG	Assists per game	SPG	Steals per game
BPG	Blocks per game	PPG	Points per game	**Bold**	Career high
*	Led the league

=== ABA/NBA ===
==== Regular season ====
Year	Team	GP	GS	MPG	FG%	3P%	FT%	RPG	APG	SPG	BPG	PPG
1968–69	Kentucky (ABA)	31		21.7	.370	–	.687	7.5	1.0			7.2
1968–69	N.Y. Nets (ABA)	20		35.7	.332	.000	.716	**14.2**	**2.0**			12.5
1968–69	Dallas (ABA)	27		26.7	**.502**	–	.691	9.1	.7			10.6
1969–70	Dallas (ABA)	**84***		36.7	.494	.000	.713	12.5	1.2			**18.8**
1970–71	Texas (ABA)	40		29.7	.448	–	**.738**	11.8	1.4			15.5
1970–71	N.Y. Nets (ABA)	40		35.7	.459	.000	.726	9.6	1.2			17.0
1971–72	N.Y. Nets (ABA)	9		15.8	.338	–	.667	4.8	.4			6.0
1971–72	Utah (ABA)	42		13.7	.367	–	.600	4.6	.6			5.3
1971–72	Florida (ABA)	18		**40.3**	.481	.000	.617	9.8	1.4			15.4
1972–73	Philadelphia (NBA)	82*	63	30.9	.404		.720	8.3	1.2			11.0
1973–74	Capital (NBA)	53		15.9	.341		.699	4.6	.5	.2	.7	4.1
Career (ABA)		311		29.7	.455	.000	.706	9.9	1.1			13.5
Career (NBA)		135	63	25.0	.391		.714	6.8	.9	.2	.7	8.3
Career (overall)		446	63	28.3	.440	.000	.707	9.0	1.1	.2	.7	11.9

==== Playoffs ====
Year	Team	GP	MPG	FG%	3P%	FT%	RPG	APG	SPG	BPG	PPG
1969	Dallas (ABA)	**7**	28.4	.406	–	**.833**	9.0	1.1			10.1
1970	Dallas (ABA)	6	**39.5**	.490	–	.714	**14.3**	**1.5**			**20.2**
1971	N.Y. Nets (ABA)	6	34.0	**.507**	–	.500	7.8	.5			12.7
1974	Capital (NBA)	2	2.5	.500		–	1.0	.0	.0	.0	1.0
Career (ABA)		19	33.7	.470	–	.708	10.3	1.1			14.1
Career (overall)		21	30.7	.471	–	.708	9.4	1.0	.0	.0	12.9
