= Riney Lochmann =

American basketball player

Personal information
- Born: May 26, 1944 (age 82) Wichita, Kansas
- Listed height: 6 ft 6 in (1.98 m)
- Listed weight: 215 lb (98 kg)

Career information
- High school: Wichita North (Wichita, Kansas)
- College: Kansas (1963–1966)
- NBA draft: 1966: undrafted
- Playing career: 1967–1970
- Position: Small forward
- Number: 31

Career history
- 1967–1970: Dallas Chaparrals

Career highlights
- Second-team Parade All-American (1962)
- Stats at Basketball Reference

Reinhold D. Lochmann (born May 26, 1944) is an American former professional basketball player from Wichita, Kansas.

A 6'6" forward from the University of Kansas, Lochmann played three seasons (1967–1970) in the American Basketball Association as a member of the Dallas Chaparrals. He averaged 4.3 points per game in his career.

== Career statistics ==
Legend
GP	Games played	GS	Games started	MPG	Minutes per game
FG%	Field goal percentage	3P%	3-point field goal percentage	FT%	Free throw percentage
RPG	Rebounds per game	APG	Assists per game	SPG	Steals per game
BPG	Blocks per game	PPG	Points per game	**Bold**	Career high

=== ABA ===
==== Regular season ====
Year	Team	GP	MPG	FG%	3P%	FT%	RPG	APG	PPG
1967–68	Dallas	**63**	12.8	.379	.250	**.620**	2.6	.7	4.2
1968–69	Dallas	60	**15.8**	.412	.250	.619	**3.4**	**1.0**	**4.9**
1969–70	Dallas	47	9.5	**.440**	**.375**	.556	2.0	.9	3.7
Career		170	13.0	.405	.313	.606	2.7	.8	4.3

==== Playoffs ====
Year	Team	GP	MPG	FG%	3P%	FT%	RPG	APG	PPG
1968	Dallas	**5**	**6.6**	.333	–	**1.000**	.6	.0	1.4
1969	Dallas	3	6.0	**.375**	–	–	**1.3**	**.3**	**2.0**
Career		8	6.4	.357	–	1.000	.9	.1	1.6
