= Cincy Powell =

American basketball player (1942–2023)

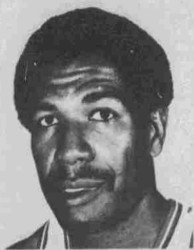

Personal information
- Born: February 25, 1942 Baton Rouge, Louisiana, U.S.
- Died: January 9, 2023 (aged 80) Dallas, Texas, U.S.
- Listed height: 6 ft 7 in (2.01 m)
- Listed weight: 220 lb (100 kg)

Career information
- High school: McKinley (Baton Rouge, Louisiana)
- College: Portland (1962–1965)
- NBA draft: 1965: 8th round, 66th overall pick
- Drafted by: St. Louis Hawks
- Playing career: 1967–1975
- Position: Small forward / power forward
- Number: 35, 24, 9, 5

Career history
- 1967–1970: Dallas Chaparrals
- 1970–1972: Kentucky Colonels
- 1972–1973: Utah Stars
- 1973–1975: Virginia Squires

Career highlights
- 2× ABA All-Star (1970, 1971); All-ABA Second Team (1968)

Career statistics
- Points: 9,746 (16.3 ppg)
- Rebounds: 4,582 (7.6 rpg)
- Assists: 1,330 (2.2 apg)
- Stats at Basketball Reference

Cincinnatus Powell (February 25, 1942 – January 9, 2023) was an American professional basketball player. A 6-foot-7-inch (2.01 m) forward from the University of Portland, Powell was selected by the St. Louis Hawks in the eighth round of the 1965 NBA draft. He did not make the Hawks' roster, but he would soon blossom while playing for the American Basketball Association's Dallas Chaparrals. Powell averaged 18.3 points and nine rebounds in his first season with the Chaparrals, and two years later he represented Dallas in the ABA All-Star Game. Powell also spent time with the Kentucky Colonels, Utah Stars, and Virginia Squires, and he ended his ABA career in 1975 with 9,746 total points. Powell is a first cousin of former United States Secretary of State Colin Powell. Powell's son, Cincy Jr. died in 2004 at age 35, the result of Juvenile Diabetes. Powell is an inductee in the University of Portland Hall of Fame.

Powell died in Dallas, Texas, on January 9, 2023, at the age of 80.

== Career statistics ==
Legend
GP	Games played	GS	Games started	MPG	Minutes per game
FG%	Field goal percentage	3P%	3-point field goal percentage	FT%	Free throw percentage
RPG	Rebounds per game	APG	Assists per game	SPG	Steals per game
BPG	Blocks per game	PPG	Points per game	**Bold**	Career high
*	Led the league

=== ABA ===
==== Regular season ====
Year	Team	GP	GS	MPG	FG%	3P%	FT%	RPG	APG	SPG	BPG	PPG
1967–68	Dallas	77		32.8	.489	.250	.692	9.0	1.4			18.3
1968–69	Dallas	75		34.3	.471	.286	.728	8.9	2.3			19.4
1969–70	Dallas	76		34.5	.468	.167	**.775**	9.0	2.5			**20.1**
1970–71	Kentucky	81		**36.2**	.493	.250	.759	**11.0**	3.1			18.0
1971–72	Kentucky	65		35.2	.474	.308	.723	7.7	**3.6**			16.1
1972–73	Utah	**83**		23.9	**.496**	.231	.696	5.1	1.7			12.2
1973–74	Virginia	82		30.3	.452	**.323**	.706	6.3	1.7	**.6**	**.4**	15.5
1974–75	Virginia	60		20.4	.404	.294	.661	3.4	1.6	.5	.1	9.2
Career		599		31.1	.472	.274	.725	7.6	2.2	.5	.3	16.3
All-Star		2	1	23.5	.600	–	1.000	8.5	.0			11.5

==== Playoffs ====
Year	Team	GP	GS	MPG	FG%	3P%	FT%	RPG	APG	SPG	BPG	PPG
1968	Dallas	8		**41.8**	.438	.000	.836	10.9	2.1			**23.4**
1969	Dallas	7		32.4	.447	**1.000**	**.860**	9.7	1.4			20.0
1970	Dallas	6		36.5	.472	.000	.707	**13.5**	**4.8**			21.8
1971	Kentucky	**19***		36.9	.489	.429	.696	13.1	2.5			18.4
1972	Kentucky	6		28.2	**.538**	.000	.789	4.0	1.5			11.8
1973	Utah	10		19.2	.416	.000	.621	3.7	.6			9.2
1974	Virginia	5		35.2	.440	.333	.786	9.6	1.0	.6	.2	20.0
Career		61		33.1	.463	.278	.754	9.7	2.0	.6	.2	17.6
