= Stembridge =

Stembridge is a surname. Notable people with the surname include:

- Gerard Stembridge (born 1958), Irish writer, director, and actor
- James Stembridge, American prop weapons supplier
- John Stembridge, American mathematician
- Terry Stembridge, American basketball broadcaster
