= Bobby Wilson (basketball, born 1944) =

American basketball player

Personal information
- Born: 1944 (age 81–82)
- Listed height: 6 ft 7 in (2.01 m)
- Listed weight: 215 lb (98 kg)

Career information
- High school: Hadley Tech (St. Louis, Missouri)
- College: Western Michigan (1963–1964); Kansas (1965–1967)
- NBA draft: 1967: undrafted
- Playing career: 1967–1968
- Position: Power forward
- Number: 22

Career history
- 1967–1968: Dallas Chaparrals
- Stats at Basketball Reference

Robert F. Wilson (born 1944) is an American former professional basketball player. He played for the Dallas Chaparrals of the American Basketball Association (ABA) during the 1967–68 ABA season. He played in 69 games and averaged 8.9 points and 6.5 rebounds per game.

Wilson played collegiately at the University of Kansas in 1965–66 and half of the 1966–67 season before leaving the team mid-year due to academic ineligibility. He had transferred to Kansas from Western Michigan University.
