= Ken Ober =

American game show host, comedian, and actor (1957–2009)

- Ken Ober hosting Remote Control
- Born: Kenneth Oberding; July 3, 1957; Brookline, Massachusetts, U.S.
- Died: November 15, 2009 (aged 52); Santa Monica, California, U.S.
- Education: University of Massachusetts Amherst (B.A., 1980)
- Occupations: Game show host, comedian, actor
- Known for: Host of Remote Control

Ken Ober (July 3, 1957 – November 15, 2009) was an American game show host, comedian, and actor.

== Early life and education ==
Born Kenneth David Ober in Brookline, Massachusetts, he was raised in a suburb of Hartford, Connecticut, where his first job was as a bagger at a local Jewish supermarket.

Ober was a substitute teacher in Boston while studying communications and education at the University of Massachusetts Amherst.

He was a founding member of the Theta Mu chapter of the Pi Kappa Alpha International Fraternity.

He graduated in 1980.

== Career ==
Ober performed stand-up comedy at New York City clubs before hosting Remote Control.

Game and talk shows

Ober hosted four game shows over the course of his career. He received his break after appearing as a contestant on Star Search in 1984. He was most widely known for the MTV game show Remote Control, which he hosted for five seasons beginning in 1987. That show also helped launch the careers of Adam Sandler, Denis Leary, Kari Wuhrer, Alicia Coppola and Colin Quinn. Ober was known among 1990s and 2000s audiences for his hosting jobs on Make Me Laugh, Smush, and the ESPN game show Perfect Match.

Ober was the frequent color analyst alongside veteran play by play announcer Steve Albert for the MTV Rock N' Jock celebrity sports specials during the 1990s.

In 1995, Ober hosted a Los Angeles talk radio show with former Brady Bunch star Susan Olsen. The show, known as Ober and Olsen, aired on 97.1 KLSX. (Olsen had previously appeared on an episode of Remote Control that featured Brady Bunch cast members competing.)

Producer

In 2002, Ober served as supervising producer for Colin Quinn's Tough Crowd with Colin Quinn. Ober was also a guest on one episode.

Ober also wrote and produced comedy series such as The New Adventures of Old Christine (2006) and Mind of Mencia (2006–2007).

Acting

In 1988, Ober co-starred on the CBS vigilante action series The Equalizer as a DJ who plays the new single on the air at WZAD and answers call-ins from fans for Beverly Heat, played by guest star Vitamin C, in "Eighteen with a Bullet."

In 1989, Ober left Remote Control to pursue acting. He has made appearances in the television series, Parenthood, Who's the Boss? and The Fresh Prince of Bel-Air.

Ober starred in the Blues Traveler video for the song "Hook". He also had a smaller role in the same band's videos for "Run-Around" and "The Mountains Win Again".

== Personal life and death ==
Ober was single.

Ober died at his home in Santa Monica on November 15, 2009, at the age of 52. According to friends, Ober had been feeling ill and was complaining of headaches, chronic chest pain, and flu-like symptoms the previous afternoon.

It was confirmed by the Los Angeles County Department of Medical Examiner-Coroner that Ober died of natural causes, chiefly ischemic heart disease.

He was survived by his mother, father, stepmother, and a brother.

== Filmography ==
Ken Ober film and television acting credits
| Year | Title | Role | Notes |
|---|---|---|---|
| 1988 | The Equalizer | DJ | Episode: "Eighteen with a Bullet" |
| 1990–1991 | Parenthood | Nathan Merrick | 12 episodes |
| 1992 | Who's the Boss? | Steve | 1 episode |
| 1992 | The Fresh Prince of Bel-Air | Howard | 1 episode |
| 1993 | Loaded Weapon | Dooley | |
| 1993 | Bounty Tracker | Marty Silk | |
