= 1967–68 Dallas Chaparrals season =

- Head coach: Cliff Hagan
- General manager: Max Williams
- Arena: Moody Coliseum; Dallas Memorial Auditorium

Results
- Record: 46–32 (.590)
- Place: Division: 2nd (Western)
- Playoff finish: Division Finals (lost to the Buccaneers 1–4)

The 1967–68 Dallas Chaparrals season was the first season of the Chaparrals in the American Basketball Association. The Chaps fell to the New Orleans Buccaneers in the Division Finals after beating the Houston Mavericks in the Semifinals. That playoff victory would be their only victory for the Chaparrals, as they fell in the Semifinals throughout the next four years before officially moving the team to San Antonio to become the San Antonio Spurs. Their series victory over the Mavericks was also the only ABA Playoff series the franchise had (either as the Chaparrals or the Spurs) before the team survived the ABA-NBA merger that came up in 1976 as the San Antonio Spurs. This season also marked the first of five consecutive playoff appearances for the Chaparrals franchise alongside the first of fifteen playoff appearances in the team's first sixteen seasons of existence when including their seasons as the Spurs alongside the Chaparrals' seasons of play.

== ABA Draft ==
First five rounds:

- #1. Matt Aitch, Michigan State University (Sr.)
- #2. Jim Burns, Northwestern University (Sr.)
- #3. Gary Gray, Oklahoma City University (Sr.)
- #4. Pat Riley, University of Kentucky (Sr.)
- #5. Jamie Thompson, Wichita State University (Sr.)

Extra Rounds:

- #6 Paul Brateris, Tennessee Wesleyan College (Sr.)
- #7 Jeff Fitch, East Texas State College (Sr.)
- #8 Ted Manning, North Carolina A&T State University (Sr.)
- #9 Duane Heckman, Dickinson College (Sr.)
- #10 Gilbert McDowell, Tennessee Wesleyan College (Sr.)
- #11 Jerry Southwood, Vanderbilt University (Sr.)
- #12 Tom Storm, Montana State University (Sr.)

It was later revealed by the Chaparrals' general manager at the time (and later, one-time future head coach) Max Williams that the draft ordering the team did that year was due to the team's original co-owner, Roland Speth (who later became the manager of The Monkees band), mistaking Williams' draft listing that he did in alphabetical order (with last names going from A-Z) as a list for the best possible talents being taken at hand as early as they could have done so.

== Roster ==
1967–68 Dallas Chaparrals roster
Players

| Pos. | No. | Player | Height | Weight | DOB | From |
|---|---|---|---|---|---|---|
| SG | 24 | Charlie Beasley | 6 ft 5 in (1.96 m) | 190 lb (86 kg) | September 23, 1945 | SMU |
| C | 44 | John Beasley | 6 ft 9 in (2.06 m) | 225 lb (102 kg) | February 5, 1944 | Texas A&M |
| SG | 20 | Jim Burns | 6 ft 3 in (1.91 m) | 195 lb (88 kg) | September 21, 1945 | Northwestern |
| C | | Mike Dabich | 7 ft 0 in (2.13 m) | 242 lb (110 kg) | December 27, 1942 | New Mexico State |
| SF | 16 | Cliff Hagan | 6 ft 4 in (1.93 m) | 210 lb (95 kg) | December 9, 1931 | Kentucky |
| PG | 15, 20 | Dennis Holman | 6 ft 3 in (1.91 m) | 175 lb (79 kg) | October 8, 1945 | SMU |
| PF | 25 | Carroll Hooser | 6 ft 7 in (2.01 m) | 230 lb (104 kg) | March 5, 1944 | SMU |
| SF | 31 | Riney Lochmann | 6 ft 6 in (1.98 m) | 215 lb (98 kg) | May 26, 1944 | Kansas |
| C | 43 | Elton McGriff | 6 ft 9 in (2.06 m) | 225 lb (102 kg) | August 21, 1942 | Creighton |
| PG | 12 | Maurice McHartley | 6 ft 3 in (1.91 m) | 185 lb (84 kg) | August 1, 1942 | North Carolina A&T |
| C | 33 | Rich Peek | 6 ft 11 in (2.11 m) | 230 lb (104 kg) | October 28, 1943 | Louisiana Tech |
| SF | 35 | Cincy Powell | 6 ft 7 in (2.01 m) | 220 lb (100 kg) | February 25, 1942 | Portland |
| G | 14 | Rubin Russell | 6 ft 2 in (1.88 m) | 180 lb (82 kg) | November 7, 1944 | North Texas |
| SG | 11 | Bob Verga | 6 ft 1 in (1.85 m) | 190 lb (86 kg) | September 7, 1945 | Duke |
| C | 12 | Gene Wiley | 6 ft 10 in (2.08 m) | 210 lb (95 kg) | November 12, 1937 | Wichita State |
| | 22 | Bobby Wilson | 6 ft 8 in (2.03 m) | 215 lb (98 kg) | 1944 | Kansas |

Coaches
Head coach

Cliff Hagan

Legend
- (DP) Unsigned draft pick
- (FA) Free agent
- (S) Suspended
- Injured

== Final standings ==
=== Western Division ===
| Team | W | L | PCT. | GB |
|---|---|---|---|---|
| New Orleans Buccaneers | 48 | 30 | .615 | – |
| Dallas Chaparrals | 46 | 32 | .590 | 2 |
| Denver Rockets | 45 | 33 | .577 | 3 |
| Houston Mavericks | 29 | 49 | .372 | 19 |
| Anaheim Amigos | 25 | 53 | .321 | 23 |
| Oakland Oaks | 22 | 56 | .282 | 26 |

== ABA Playoffs ==
ABA Western Division Semifinals

| Game | Date | Location | Score | Record | Attendance |
| 1 | March 23 | Dallas | 111–110 | 1–0 | 1,857 |
| 2 | March 25 | Dallas | 115–97 | 2–0 | 891 |
| 3 | March 26 | Houston | 116–103 | 3–0 | 3,117 |

Chaparrals win series 3–0

ABA Western Division Finals

| Game | Date | Location | Score | Record | Attendance |
| 1 | April 5 | New Orleans | 99–104 | 0–1 | 3,332 |
| 2 | April 9 | New Orleans | 112–109 | 1–1 | 5,287 |
| 3 | April 10 | Dallas | 107–110 | 1–2 | 4,825 |
| 4 | April 11 | Dallas | 103–119 | 1–3 | 3,623 |
| 5 | April 13 | New Orleans | 107–108 | 1–4 | 4,614 |

Chaparrals lose series 4–1

== Awards and honors ==
1968 ABA All-Star Game selections (game played on January 9, 1968)

- Cliff Hagan
- John Beasley
