= MTV Rock N' Jock =

Television series

- Created by: Patrick Byrnes
- Starring: Steve Albert, Ken Ober, Dan Cortese, Bill Bellamy, Chris Connelly
- Country of origin: United States

Production
- Running time: 60 – 90 minutes

Original release
- Network: MTV
- Release: April 1, 1990

MTV Rock N' Jock is a television series on MTV featuring actors, musicians, and other entertainers playing sports with professional athletes. The original episode was called The MTV Rock N' Jock Diamond Derby, and was changed to MTV's Rock N' Jock Softball Challenge, in year 2. The concept expanded to include basketball in 1991, football in 1997 and bowling in 1999 The game was an annual feature (with multiple reruns of most episodes) for many years on MTV.

The original announcers were professional sportscaster, Steve Albert and comedian Ken Ober who provided color commentary. Bill Bellamy and MTV Sports host Dan Cortese initially participated as players and then as coaches in later years.

The fourth annual Rock N' Jock B-Ball Jam was nominated for the Daytime Emmy Award for Outstanding Game Show in 1995, losing to Jeopardy!.

== Partial list of shows ==
=== MTV's First Annual Rock N' Jock Diamond Derby (1990) ===
- Location: Dedeaux Field, USC, Los Angeles, CA
- Date: Sunday, January 21, 1990
- Team names: Aardvarks, Salamanders
- Team coaches: Sam Kinison (Aardvarks), Sammy Hagar (Salamanders)
- Announcers: Steve Albert, Ken Ober
- Sideline Reporters: Martha Quinn, Kevin Seal, Downtown Julie Brown, Jim Turner
- National Anthem: Steve Vai

Aardvarks
Eddie Murray (1B) Baseball Player, Baltimore Orioles, 2003 Hall of Fame
Bret Michaels (2B) Musician, Lead Singer of Poison
Barry Larkin (SS) Baseball Player, Cincinnati Reds, 2012 Hall of Fame
Corbin Bernsen (3B) Actor, Major League trilogy
Mark McGwire (RF) Baseball Player, Oakland A's (583 home runs)
Belinda Carlisle (RCF) Musician, Lead Singer, The Go-Go's
Howard Johnson (LCF) Baseball Player, NY Mets
MC Hammer (LF) Rapper/Dancer, 3x Grammy Award winner
Tom Petersson Musician, Bass Player, Cheap Trick
Roger McDowell (P) Baseball Player, NY Mets, 1986 World Series Champion
Lou Gramm (DH) Musician, Foreigner, 2013 Songwriters Hall of Fame
David Faustino Actor, Married... With Children
Brian Robbins Actor, Head of the Class
Keanu Reeves Actor, Bill & Ted's Excellent Adventure

Salamanders
Wally Joyner (1B), Baseball Player, California Angels, All-Star
Tone Loc (2B), Rapper, Wild Thing (Tone Loc song) and Funky Cold Medina
Shawon Dunston (SS), Baseball Player, Chicago Cubs, 2x All-Star
Kevin Costner (3B) Actor, Dances With Wolves 2x Academy Award winner
Darryl Strawberry (RF) Baseball Player, NY Mets, 1986 World Series Champion
Kip Winger (RCF) Musician, Winger (band)
Rafael Palmeiro (LCF) Baseball Player, Texas Rangers
Steven Adler (LF) Musician, Drummer, Guns N' Roses, Rock N Roll Hall of Fame 2012
Bruce Hornsby (C) Musician, 3x Grammy Award winner
Mark Langston (P) Baseball Player, California Angels, 4x All-Star
Robert Wuhl Actor/Writer, Arliss
Holly Robinson Peete Actor, 21 Jump Street
Robin Zander Musician, Lead Singer, Cheap Trick
Mike Lookinland Actor, "Bobby Brady" on The Brady Bunch
Rick Caraballo Contest winner

=== MTV's First Annual Rock N' Jock B-Ball Jam (1991) ===
- Location: Gersten Pavilion, Loyola Marymount University, CA
- Date: Sunday, September 15, 1991
- Team names: Bricklayers, Violators
- Team coaches: Craig T. Nelson (Bricklayers), Magic Johnson (Violators)
- Announcers: Steve Albert, Ken Ober
- PA Announcer: Lawrence Tanner
- Referee: Hue Hollins Officiated 19 NBA Finals & 5 NBA All-Star games
- Sideline Reporters: Kari Wuhrer, Downtown Julie Brown
- Halftime Performer: Marky Mark and the Funky Bunch, Loleatta Holloway, "Good Vibrations"
- Slam Dunk Contest: Mark Wahlberg
- 3pt Contest: Will Smith (5 of 15)
- Mascots: The Hornet, Phoenix Gorilla

Bricklayers
#14 Mark Wahlberg Actor/Rapper, Boogie Nights (28pts)
#5 Morris Chestnut Actor, Boyz n the Hood (Co-MVP/50 points)
#22 John Salley (Center/Power Forward) Detroit Pistons, 4x NBA Champion
#3 Flea Musician/Bass Player, Red Hot Chili Peppers
#9 Dan Majerle (Small Forward) Phoenix Suns, 3x All-Star
#90210 Luke Perry Actor, Beverly Hills 90210
#31 Kurt Rambis (Power Forward) LA Lakers, 4x NBA Champion
#8 Jaleel White Actor, Urkel on Family Matters
Billy Wirth Actor, The Lost Boys
#4 Spud Webb (Point Guard) Atlanta Hawks

Violators
#32 Magic Johnson (Point Guard/Shooting Guard) Los Angeles Lakers, 12x All-Star, Hall of Fame
#31 Reggie Miller (Shooting Guard) Indiana Pacers, 5x All-Star, Hall of Fame (Co-MVP/76pts)
#33 Will Smith Actor/Rapper, The Fresh Prince of Bel-Air, 4x Grammy winner
#12 Vlade Divac (Center) Los Angeles Lakers, Hall of Fame
#23 Donnie Wahlberg Actor/Musician, New Kids On The Block (9pts)
#4 Ron Harper (Point Guard) Los Angeles Clippers, 5x NBA Champion
#10 Michael Bivins Singer/Rapper, New Edition, Bell Biv Devoe
#25 Corin Nemec Actor, Parker Lewis Can't Lose
#21 MC Lyte Rapper/Actor, First solo female rapper to release a full album
#30 Robert Wuhl Actor/Writer, Arliss, Bull Durham

- Score: Bricklayers 180 > Violators 173

=== MTV's Second Annual Rock N' Jock Softball Challenge (1991) ===
- Location: Dedeaux Field, USC, Los Angeles, CA
- Date: Saturday, January 12, 1991

Homeboys

- Anthony Kiedis (#2), Singer/Actor, Red Hot Chili Peppers

Awayboys

- MC Hammer (#17), Rapper
- Dave Winfield (#31), Baseball Player, California Angels, 12-time MLB All-Star streak between 1977 and 1988

=== MTV's Third Annual Rock N' Jock Softball Challenge (1992) ===
Announcer: Steve Albert

Homeboys

- John Corbett (#50), Actor/Singer, Northern Exposure

Awayboys

- Anthony Kiedis (#0.0), Singer/Actor, Red Hot Chili Peppers, Point Break
- MC Hammer (#2), Rapper
- Rafael Palmeiro, Baseball Player, Texas Rangers, 2-time MLB All-Star (1988 and 1991)

=== MTV's Fourth Annual Rock N' Jock Softball Challenge (1994) ===
- Location: Blair Field, Long Beach, CA
- Date: Saturday, January 23, 1993
- Team names: Homeboys, Awayboys
- Team coaches: Corbin Bernsen (Homeboys), Dan Cortese (Awayboys)

Homeboys
Corbin Bernsen (#7, SS), actor
Chuck D (#1, LF), musician, Public Enemy
Ken Griffey Jr. (#24, LCF), Baseball Player
Jose Canseco (#33, 1B), Baseball Player
Jon Bon Jovi (#5, 2B), Musician, Lead Singer, Bon Jovi
Gary Sheffield (#10, 3B), Baseball Player
Treach (#118, C), musician, Naughty By Nature
Brady Anderson (#9, RF), Baseball Player
Scott Ian (#15, RCF), musician, Anthrax
Dwight Gooden (#16, P), Baseball Player
David Bryan (#11, 1B), musician, Bon Jovi
Richie Sambora (#3, OF), musician, Bon Jovi
Flavor Flav (#911, RF/P), musician, Public Enemy

Awayboys
Dan Cortese (#00, SS), MTV Host
Bret Michaels (#58, C), musician, Poison
David Justice (#23, RF), Baseball Player
Michael Richards (#8, LF), actor, Seinfeld
Frank Thomas (#35, 1B), Baseball Player
Barry Bonds (#25, LCF), Baseball Player
Dweezil Zappa (#22, RCF), musician
Robin Ventura (#23, 3B) Baseball Player
Salt (Cheryl James) (#54, 2B), musician, Salt-n-Pepa
Pepa (Sandy Denton) (#68, 2B), musician, Salt-n-Pepa
Spin (Deidre Roper) (#7, 2B), musician, Salt-n-Pepa
Roger McDowell (#31, P), Baseball Player
Billy Ragsdale (#5, IF/OF), actor

=== MTV's Fourth Annual Rock N' Jock B-Ball Jam (1994) ===
- Location: Bren Events Center, Irvine, CA.
- Hosts: Van Earl Wright and David Alan Grier
- Team names: Violators, Bricklayers
- Team coaches: Bill Bellamy (Violators), Dan Cortese (Bricklayers)

Bricklayers

- #00 Dan Cortese
- #X David Duchovny
- #2 Mitch Richmond
- #3 Clifford Robinson
- #7 Kenny Lofton
- #11 Dean Cain
- #15 David Charvet
- #32 Queen Latifah
- #33 Mark Curry
- #34 Isaiah Rider
- #44 Rick Mahorn

Violators

- General Manager: Kareem Abdul-Jabaar
- #4 Chris Webber
- #5 KayGee
- #9 Eric Nies
- #11 Nate Morris (Boyz II Men)
- #20 Gary Payton
- #22 Michael McCary (Boyz II Men)
- #23 Bill Bellamy (player-coach)
- #24 Ken Griffey Jr.
- #31 Reggie Miller
- #34 Joey Lawrence
- #40 Shawn Kemp
- #44 Michael Rapaport

=== MTV's Fifth Annual Rock n' Jock Softball Challenge (1994) ===
- Location: Blair Field, Long Beach, CA
- Date: Saturday, January 15, 1994
- Team names: Homeboys, Awayboys
- Team coaches: Norman Fell (Homeboys), Tom Arnold (Awayboys)

=== MTV's Fifth Annual Rock N' Jock B-Ball Jam (1995) ===
- Team names: Violators, Bricklayers
- Team coaches: Bill Bellamy (Violators), Dan Cortese (Bricklayers)

=== MTV's Sixth Annual Rock N' Jock Softball Challenge (1995) ===
- Team names: Homeboys, Awayboys
- Team coaches: Dan Cortese (Homeboys), Bill Bellamy (Awayboys)

=== MTV's Sixth Annual Rock N' Jock B-Ball Jam (1996) ===
- Team names: Violators, Bricklayers
- Team coaches: Bill Bellamy (Violators), Dean Cain (Bricklayers)

=== MTV's Seventh Annual Rock N' Jock B-Ball Jam (1997) ===
- Hosts: Steve Albert and Chris Connelly
- Team names: Violators, Bricklayers
- Team coaches: Shaquille O'Neal (Violators), Bill Walton (Bricklayers)

Bricklayers

- #3 Stephon Marbury
- #8 David Arquette
- #11 Dean Cain
- #17 Jerry O'Connell
- #21 Kevin Garnett
- #22 Sheryl Swoopes
- #32 Chris Spencer
- #33 Marcus Schenkenberg
- #40 Coolio
- #69 Flea
- #77 Elisa Donovan

Violators

- #00 Method Man
- #6 Judd Nelson
- #7 Michelle Timms
- #8 Bill Bellamy
- #10 Shareef Abdur-Rahim
- #12 Michael Bergin
- #20 Gary Payton
- #23 Brian McKnight
- #31 Brent Barry
- #33 Jonathan Taylor Thomas
- #43 Busta Rhymes

=== MTV's Eighth Annual Rock N' Jock B-Ball Jam (1998) ===
- Date: September 17, 1998
- Hosts: Marlon Wayans and Jayson Wlliams
- Emcee: DJ Funkmaster Flex

This year was a four-team tournament

All-Stars (green)

- #20 Gary Payton (captain)
- #3 Bryon Russell
- #6 David Boreanaz
- #8 David Arquette
- #10 Elise Neal
- #12 Nicholas Brendon
- #33 Marcus Schenkenberg

Players' Club (yellow)

- #21 Kevin Garnett (captain)
- #3 Damon Stoudamire
- #00 Method Man
- #1 Redman
- #87 Erick Sermon
- #357 Cam'ron

NSYNC (blue)

- #13 Mark Jackson
- #33 Antawn Jamison
- #1 1/2 Justin Timberlake (captain)
- #4 Lance Bass
- #7 Chris Kirkpatrick
- #21 JC Chasez
- #28 Joey Fatone

Team MTV (red)

- #2 Derek Fisher
- #42 Chris Mills
- #8 Bill Bellamy (captain)
- #12 Tsianina Joelson
- #13 Syrus Yarbourough
- #22 Carson Daly
- #37 Chadwick Pelletier
- #69 David "Puck" Rainey

=== MTV Rock N' Jock Bowling Ball (1999) ===
- Musical Guests: Method Man & Redman, New Radicals

=== MTV's Tenth Annual Rock N' Jock Softball Challenge (1999) ===
Stars

- Andre Young (aka Dr. Dre), Rapper
- Jeremy London, Actor
- Reginald Noble (aka Redman), Rapper/Actor
- Melissa Joan Hart, Actress
- Rob Van Winkle (aka Vanilla Ice), Rapper/Actor
- Brian McKnight, Singer-Songwriter/Producer
- Michael Bergin, Actor
- Clifford Smith Jr. (aka Method Man), Rapper/Actor
