= Howie Hoffman =

American basketball player (1921–1996)

Personal information
- Born: December 4, 1921 Bridgeport, Indiana, U.S.
- Died: October 22, 1996 (aged 74) Danville, Indiana, U.S.
- Listed height: 6 ft 4 in (1.93 m)
- Listed weight: 195 lb (88 kg)

Career information
- College: Purdue (1940–1943)
- Position: Guard / forward

Career history
- 1943–1946: Indianapolis Pure Oils
- 1944–1945: Oshkosh All-Stars
- 1946: Anderson Duffey Packers

Howard Albert Hoffman (December 4, 1921 – October 22, 1996) was an American professional basketball player. He played in the National Basketball League for the Oshkosh All-Stars and Anderson Duffey Packers and averaged 5.1 points per game. Hoffman also served in World War II and served as a farmer until his retirement.
