= Terry Stembridge =

Terry Stembridge Sr. is an American former basketball broadcaster.

Stembridge was born in Tyler, Texas, and grew up in Kilgore, Texas, but his family moved to Yazoo City, Mississippi for his high school years.

When the American Basketball Association began play in 1967, Stembridge broadcast the Dallas Chaparrals games on radio. Stembridge continued as the team's announcer after it became the San Antonio Spurs and when the Spurs moved into the NBA as part of the ABA-NBA merger. Stembridge broadcast 1,252 consecutive Chaparrals/Spurs games and served as their announcer for fifteen years.

In 1973, Stembridge also became part of the broadcast team for the Texas Rangers baseball team, a role he relinquished in 1974.

Stembridge later co-authored a book on the history of Kilgore, Texas.

His son, Terry Stembridge Jr. is also a sportscaster, who was the Minnesota Vikings play by play announcer in 2001. Stembridge Jr. was hired by Red McCombs, who Stembridge Sr. worked for in San Antonio.
