= Steve Albert =

American sportscaster (born 1952)

Steve Albert (born Stephen Aufrichtig on April 26, 1952, in Brooklyn, New York) is an American former sportscaster. He has served as a play-by-play announcer for the New Jersey Nets, New Orleans Hornets, Golden State Warriors, New York Mets, and Phoenix Suns as well as the Major Indoor Soccer League's New York Arrows. Albert ended his career as the television play-by-play announcer for the Phoenix Suns. He retired following the Suns' 2016–2017 season.

He also served as a broadcaster for the New York Islanders, New York Rangers, Cleveland Crusaders and New York Jets, and as the sports anchor at WCBS-TV, WNBC-TV and WWOR-TV and did morning sports reports on WABC (AM). He covered major boxing fights on Showtime Championship Boxing for 17 years, including the infamous "Bite Fight" between Mike Tyson and Evander Holyfield in 1997. He was inducted in the International Boxing Hall of Fame as a member of the Class of 2018.

Steve was the play-by-play announcer for the "MTV Rock N' Jock" celebrity sports specials, partnered with comedian & game show host, Ken Ober, during the 1990s.

He has also been a co-host on the short-lived syndicated game show The Grudge Match alongside future Minnesota governor Jesse Ventura. He was also the play-by-play announcer for Battle Dome.

== Personal life ==
Albert is the younger brother of broadcasters Marv Albert and Al Albert. He is the uncle of current NFL on Fox and NHL on TNT announcer Kenny Albert.
