= Frank Sims =

American baseball broadcaster (1921–2015)

Sims

Frank J. Sims (February 18, 1921 – January 23, 2015) was an American baseball broadcaster.

Born in 1921, Sims served with the American Army Air Forces during World War II as a B-17 bomber pilot. At one point he was shot down and taken as a prisoner of war by the Germans.

He joined the Philadelphia Phillies broadcasting team in 1960, replacing Gene Kelly alongside Byrum Saam and Claude Haring. He remained there through 1962. With the San Diego Padres, he worked alongside Duke Snider and Jerry Gross. He also worked for the Detroit Tigers, Los Angeles Dodgers, Los Angeles Angels and Albuquerque Dukes.

He died on January 23, 2015, at age 93 and is interred at Miramar National Cemetery in San Diego.
