= Dick Palmer (broadcaster) =

Dick Palmer has been an American radio broadcaster based in Memphis, Tennessee for over fifty years.

Palmer graduated from Middle Tennessee State University in 1960.

Palmer was known as a sports announcer, including as the on air voice of the Memphis Pros, Memphis Tams and Memphis Sounds of the American Basketball Association, the Memphis Southmen (also known as the Memphis Grizzlies) of the World Football League and Middle Tennessee State University sports.

Palmer has broadcast for Memphis stations including WREC, WOWW and WGNS.

== External links and references ==
- Honoring the Distinguished Servicer of Dick Palmer
- WGNS Radio
- Clip of Palmer broadcast of Florida Blazers vs. Memphis Southmen WFL game, October 16, 1974
- RememberTheABA.com Memphis Tams Fan Memories
- Interview with Dick Palmer
