= Max Williams (basketball) =

American basketball coach (1938–2025)

Personal information
- Born: February 28, 1938 Avoca, Texas, U.S.
- Died: January 28, 2025 (aged 86)

Career information
- High school: Avoca (Avoca, Texas)
- College: SMU (1957–1960)

Career history

Coaching
- 1970: Dallas Chaparrals

Clarence Max Williams (February 28, 1938 – January 28, 2025) was an American basketball coach of the Dallas Chaparrals as part of the American Basketball Association in 1970. Apart from his 28 wins and 32 losses, Williams was the general manager of the Chaparrals from 1967 to 1971. Before he joined the ABA, Williams accumulated 3,360 career points as a high school basketball player during the 1950s in Avoca, Texas. With the SMU Mustangs men's basketball team, Williams held the free throw percentage season record for the university in 1958 and 1960. He had 940 career points with SMU after his final season in 1960.

From the 1960s to 1970s, Williams worked in insurance and real estate while in Dallas. After becoming senior vice president for his real estate employer in 1975, Williams started companies in oil and real estate. He continued to work on oil production projects throughout the late 1970s. Williams was inducted into the Texas Sports Hall of Fame in 2009.

== Early life and education ==
Williams was born in Avoca, Texas on February 28, 1938. He grew up in Avoca and Guthrie with his family. During his teens, Williams was raised by his mother after his father's death. As a high school basketball player from 1953 to 1956, Williams accumulated 3,360 career points at Avoca after 140 games. While with Avoca, Williams won the 1955 Texas boys basketball title in the Class B division held by the University Interscholastic League.

In 1956, Williams joined Southern Methodist University on an athletic scholarship. At SMU, Williams started playing basketball as part of their freshmen team that year before joining the SMU Mustangs men's basketball team in 1957. Williams was a co-captain of the SMU team for the 1957–58 and 1958–59 seasons. During his time at SMU, Williams held the free throw percentage season record for the university in 1958 and 1960. After his 73 games with the men's team, Williams accumulated 845 assists and 295 rebounds as part of his 940 points. Williams also joined the Cycen Fjodr while remaining at SMU as a graduate student in 1960.

== Career ==
After college, Williams went to Dallas and worked in insurance. With the American Basketball Association, Williams helped organized the creation of the Dallas Chaparrals. He became the team's general manager upon their establishment in 1967 and held the position until 1971. During his time as general manager, Williams took over as the Chaparrals's head coach when Cliff Hagan resigned in 1970.

As an ABA head coach, Williams had 28 wins and 32 losses. During the 1970 ABA Playoffs, Williams and the Chaparrals reached the semifinals of the Western Division. He remained as both the team's head coach and general manager until Bill Blakely became coach of the Chaparrals in November 1970. While working as their general manager, Williams was fired from the Chaparrals in April 1971. Outside of coaching, Williams was also in charge of tickets.

After leaving the Chaparrals, Williams became a real estate agent for a Dallas company in 1971 and was promoted to senior vice president in 1975. The same year, Williams started up companies in real estate and oil. As an oilman, Williams worked together with Irv Deal and Ray Holifield in oil production projects throughout the late 1970s.

== Personal life and death ==
Williams was married and had two children. He died on January 28, 2025, at the age of 86.

== Awards and honors ==
Williams was inducted into the Texas Sports Hall of Fame in 2009 and the Big Country Athletic Hall of Fame in 2013. He was also selected as one of the best 100 boys basketball players in Texas by the UIL upon the organization's 100th anniversary.

== ABA ==
Legend
Regular season	G	Games coached	W	Games won	L	Games lost	W–L %	Win–loss %
Playoffs	PG	Playoff games	PW	Playoff wins	PL	Playoff losses	PW–L %	Playoff win–loss %

Team	Year	G	W	L	W–L%	Finish	PG	PW	PL	PW–L%	Result
Dallas	1969–70	41	23	18	.561	2nd in Western	6	2	4	.333	Lost division semifinals
Texas	1970–71	19	5	14	.263	(reassigned)	–	–	–	–	–
Career		60	28	32	.467		6	2	4	.333	
