= John Beasley (basketball) =

American basketball player

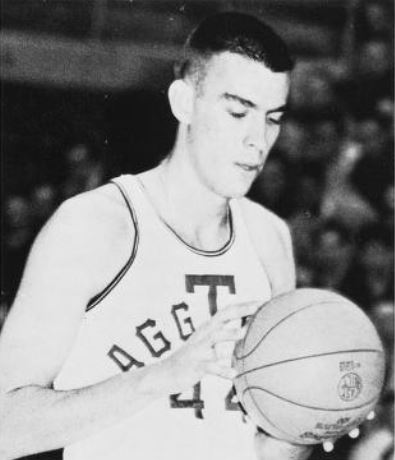

Personal information
- Born: February 5, 1944 Texarkana, Texas, U.S.
- Died: November 23, 2022 (aged 78)
- Listed height: 6 ft 9 in (2.06 m)
- Listed weight: 225 lb (102 kg)

Career information
- High school: Linden-Kildare (Linden, Texas)
- College: Texas A&M (1963–1966)
- NBA draft: 1966: 5th round, 45th overall pick
- Drafted by: Baltimore Bullets
- Playing career: 1966–1974
- Position: Forward / center
- Number: 44

Career history
- 1966–1967: Phillips 66ers
- 1967: Allentown Jets
- 1967–1971: Dallas/Texas Chaparrals
- 1971–1974: Utah Stars

Career highlights
- 3× ABA All-Star (1968–1970); ABA All-Star Game MVP (1969); 2× All-ABA Second Team (1968, 1969); 2× SWC Player of the Year (1965, 1966)

Career ABA statistics
- Points: 6,909
- Rebounds: 4,257
- Assists: 602
- Stats at Basketball Reference

John Michael Beasley (February 5, 1944 – November 23, 2022) was an American professional basketball player born in Texarkana, Texas.

A 6'9" forward/center from Texas A&M University, Beasley was selected in the fifth round of the 1966 NBA draft by the Baltimore Bullets. Beasley never played in the NBA, however, spending most of his career with the rival American Basketball Association.

Beasley played seven seasons (1967–1974) in the ABA as a member of the Dallas Chaparrals and Utah Stars, making ABA All-Star Game appearances in 1968, 1969, and 1970. He was named Most Valuable Player of the 1969 game, following his 19-point and 14 rebound performance for the West squad. Beasley scored 6,909 total points and grabbed 4,257 total rebounds in his ABA career.

== Career statistics ==
Legend
GP	Games played	GS	Games started	MPG	Minutes per game
FG%	Field goal percentage	3P%	3-point field goal percentage	FT%	Free throw percentage
RPG	Rebounds per game	APG	Assists per game	SPG	Steals per game
BPG	Blocks per game	PPG	Points per game	**Bold**	Career high
*	Led the league

=== ABA ===
==== Regular season ====
Year	Team	GP	GS	MPG	FG%	3P%	FT%	RPG	APG	SPG	BPG	PPG
1967–68	Dallas	77		36.9	.492	.000	.842	**12.8**	1.5			**19.7**
1968–69	Dallas	78		**39.1**	.488	.300	.826	10.6	1.4			19.3
1969–70	Dallas	**84***		36.5	.499	**.375**	.818	12.0	1.6			18.3
1970–71	Texas	83		32.4	.497	.276	.828	9.2	**1.8**			15.9
1971–72	Dallas	12		22.3	.494	.000	.828	7.5	1.1			9.0
1971–72	Utah	58		10.6	.452	.348	.804	3.4	.4			3.9
1972–73	Utah	71		13.2	**.513**	.326	.886	3.7	.6			7.3
1973–74	Utah	43		11.2	.414	.344	**.909**	2.8	.4	.2	.2	4.2
Career		506		27.6	.491	.316	.831	8.4	1.2	.2	.2	13.7
All-Star		3	1	23.7	.607	1.000	1.000	8.7	.7			13.0

==== Playoffs ====
Year	Team	GP	MPG	FG%	3P%	FT%	RPG	APG	SPG	BPG	PPG
1968	Dallas	8	**41.5**	.474	**.500**	.843	**12.6**	1.3			**21.3**
1969	Dallas	7	34.3	.489	.000	.882	10.4	1.1			17.4
1970	Dallas	6	36.5	.581	.000	.889	10.7	**3.2**			18.0
1971	Texas	4	28.8	.385	.250	.800	10.5	1.5			11.5
1972	Utah	**9**	18.7	.529	.167	**1.000**	5.8	1.0			4.7
1973	Utah	8	12.8	**.595**	.250	.750	2.9	.6			6.1
1974	Utah	**9**	10.9	.310	.222	.750	2.3	.6	.0	.2	2.6
Career		51	25.0	.490	.222	.857	7.4	1.2	.0	.2	11.0
