= Van Vance =

American sports broadcaster and announcer

- Born: Park City, Kentucky, U.S.
- Occupation: Sports announcer

Van Vance is an American sports broadcaster and announcer.

Vance, a native of Park City, Kentucky, began work at WHAS TV & radio in Louisville in 1957. Vance appeared on WHAS radio as the announcer for the Kentucky Colonels of the American Basketball Association, often with Cawood Ledford. After the Colonels folded as part of the ABA-NBA merger in June 1976, Vance was best known for broadcasting University of Louisville basketball games (including the 1986 NCAA National Championship Team) on the same station. Vance worked on the air for WHAS from 1957 through 1999.

For more than ten years Vance also worked at the American Printing House for the Blind in Louisville, Kentucky recording Sports Illustrated articles in audio format so that they could be 'read' by the blind.

In 2003, Vance was inducted into the Kentucky Athletic Hall of Fame.
