= 1972–73 Dallas Chaparrals season =

ABA basketball team season

- Head coach: Babe McCarthy (24–48); Dave Brown (4–8)
- Arena: Moody Coliseum; Dallas Memorial Auditorium

Results
- Record: 28–56 (.333)
- Place: Division: 5th (Western)

Local media
- Television: KDTV 39
- Radio: WRR

The 1972–73 Dallas Chaparrals season was the sixth and final season of the Chaparrals in the American Basketball Association, including the one and only season where they tried to represent the entire state of Texas as opposed to the city of Dallas on its own. Throughout the majority of the season, former New Orleans Buccaneers/Memphis Pros head coach Babe McCarthy would coach the Chaparrals before being replaced by Dave Brown for the team's final twelve games of the season in a last-ditch effort to make it to the 1973 ABA Playoffs. However, the Chaps failed to make it to the playoffs for the first time in franchise history (as well the only time they failed to make it to the playoffs both while using the Chaparrals team name and while they played in the ABA), finishing dead last in the Western Division, though they surprisingly missed the final playoff spot of the playoffs in the Western Division side by just two games to the San Diego Conquistadors expansion team. Low attendance, which had been a problem for most of the team's tenure, led to an agreement from the Chaparrals owners to sell the team to a San Antonio group called "Professional Sports, Inc.", which was led by Angelo Drossos, John Schaefer and Red McCombs, in what was considered a "lend-lease" deal by both of the ownership groups. Part of this unique "lend-lease" deal of theirs involved the team being leased to play in San Antonio under a new team name (originally planned to have been the San Antonio Gunslingers before later becoming the San Antonio Spurs in time for their first official season in San Antonio to begin) for three years, and if the team was not purchased by the end of the agreement (which would have happened by 1975), it would be returned to Dallas going forward, potentially with the Chaparrals name back at hand. However, their first season in San Antonio turned out to be a roaring success for the franchise while under the new Spurs team name, and the new group decided to buy the team outright from the old owners and keep the team in San Antonio for good, which later resulted in them joining the NBA when the two leagues officially merged in 1976 due to their quickly growing fanbase within the city of San Antonio. Dallas would not have another professional basketball team in their city until 1980, when the Dallas Mavericks (a team completely separate from the original Houston Mavericks ABA franchise) officially began play as an expansion franchise in the NBA, meaning the NBA would have three separate NBA franchises in the state of Texas with the San Antonio Spurs, Dallas Mavericks, and Houston Rockets by the start of the 1980s.

== ABA Draft ==
Weirdly enough, as of 2025, there has been no official draft records for the first five rounds of the 1972 ABA draft specifically, while every other round after that point has been properly recorded by basketball historians otherwise. Because of the strange dispersity of draft picks not being properly recorded this year after previously being fully recorded in the previous year's draft and the number of rounds potentially being off for even the players being selected this year, the recorded players selected in this year's draft will be marked with a ? for the pick number in particular (as well as certain round numbers, if necessary) in order to showcase the awkward display currently going on with the 1972 ABA draft year in particular (though what is known is that the Dallas Chaparrals would have the official #5 pick of the ABA draft this year due to both the Memphis Pros and New York Nets losing their respective picks (which would have been picks #2 & #6 had they both been kept, meaning Dallas would have had the #7 pick in the first round in that case instead) with Memphis signing Larry Cannon from the Denver Rockets sometime after the previous year's ABA draft and the Nets signing Jim Chones, a junior college player previously selected by the Virginia Squires before being considered a disqualified pick by the ABA that year, sometime after the 1971 ABA draft as well). However, if any changes come up to where a proper, official recording of the 1972 ABA draft gets released displaying both pick numbers and round numbers for where certain players got selected, please provide the updated (potential) draft ordering with a source confirming the round and pick numbers included here.

| Round | Pick | Player | Position(s) | Nationality | College |
|---|---|---|---|---|---|
| 1 | 5 | LaRue Martin | C | United States | Loyola University (Chicago) |
| 2 | 14(?) | Mike Ratliff | C | United States | Wisconsin–Eau Claire |
| 3 | 23(?) | Bob Morse | SF/PF | United States | Pennsylvania |
| 4 | 33(?) | Bill Walton | C | United States | UCLA |
| 5 | 39(?) | Steve Hawes | PF/C | United States | Washington |
| 6 | 49(?) | Jim Creighton | PF | United States | Colorado |
| 7 | 60(?) | Frank Schade | PG | United States | Wisconsin–Eau Claire |
| 8 | 71(?) | Ansley Truitt | PF | United States | California |
| 9 | 82(?) | Wayne Grabiec | G | United States | Michigan |
| 10 | 93(?) | Jerry Zielinski | SG/SF | United States | Northern Illinois |
| 11 | 104(?) | Jeff Hickman | SG | United States | Houston |
| 12 | 115(?) | Stan Key | G | United States | Kentucky |
| 13 | 126(?) | Donn Weise | C | United States | Ripon College |
| 14 | 137(?) | Rhea Taylor | SF | United States | Arizona State |
| 15 | 147(?) | Ron Williams | G | United States | Murray State |
| 16 | 156(?) | Rich Walker | G | United States | Bowling Green State |
| 17 | 166(?) | Al Vilcheck | PF/C | United States | Louisville |

This draft was notable for the selection of LaRue Martin, who infamously became the #1 pick of the 1972 NBA draft over Bob McAdoo; Martin would later become one of the biggest #1 pick busts in NBA draft history. It was also notable for them selecting another future #1 pick with Bill Walton, who later became the #1 pick of the 1974 NBA draft; by contrast to LaRue Martin, Bill Walton would end up becoming a member of the Naismith Basketball Hall of Fame, despite them both never playing for the franchise either in the ABA or the NBA once the eventual ABA-NBA merger occurred in 1976. Finally, Dallas was only one of a select few teams to not lose any of their selections during the first five rounds of the draft, though the Chaparrals decided not to utilize all 20 rounds of the ABA draft this year due to them skipping out on using selections in the last three rounds of that draft.

=== ABA Dispersal Draft ===
Months after the original ABA draft for this year concluded, the ABA held their first ever dispersal draft on July 13, 1972 after it was found out by the ABA itself that neither "The Floridians" nor the Pittsburgh Condors would be able to continue operations either in their original locations or elsewhere in the U.S.A. (or even Canada in the case of "The Floridians"). Unlike the main draft they did during the months of March and April, this draft would last for only six rounds as a one day deal and would have the nine remaining inaugural ABA teams selecting players that were left over at the time from both "The Floridians" and Pittsburgh Condors franchises (including draft picks from both teams there) and obtain their player rights from there. Any players from either franchise that wouldn't be selected during this draft would be placed on waivers and enter free agency afterward. Interestingly, only 42 total players were selected by the nine remaining ABA teams at the time of the dispersal draft, meaning everyone else that was available from both teams was considered a free agent to the ABA not long afterward. Not only that, but the Chaparrals joined the Carolina Cougars, Denver Rockets, and Memphis Pros turned Memphis Tams as one of only four ABA teams to gain an extra first round pick due to them being the four worst ABA teams from the previous season to survive into this current season of play. Even so, the following players were either Floridians or Condors players that the Chaparrals acquired during this dispersal draft.

| Round | Pick | Player | Position(s) | Nationality | College | ABA Team |
|---|---|---|---|---|---|---|
| 1 | 4 | John Brisker | SG/SF | United States | Toledo | Pittsburgh Condors |
| 1 | 5 | Skeeter Swift | SG | United States | East Tennessee State | Pittsburgh Condors |
| 2 | 17 | John Gianelli | PF/C | United States | Pacific | Pittsburgh Condors |
| 3 | 25 | Jerry Brucks | C | United States | Wyoming | The Floridians |
| 4 | 33 | Bobby Jack | F | United States | Oklahoma | The Floridians |

Dallas' first pick in the dispersal draft, John Brisker, was notable for him being an undrafted ABA player that ended up becoming a two-time ABA All-Star and an All-ABA Second Team member during his time with the Pittsburgh Condors. Their second pick, Skeeter Swift, ended up becoming the only player from this draft to actually play for the Chaparrals when the dispersal draft was completed. As for the other three selections, all of John Gianelli, Jerry Brucks, and Bobby Jack were draft picks selected by the Pittsburgh Condors and "The Floridians" franchises respectively (with Brucks and Jack both being selected by "The Floridians" in particular), but none of them would sign up with Dallas, with Gianelli notably joining the New York Knicks in the NBA instead. One other notable player that the Chaparrals acquired after the dispersal draft came and went that was previously involved with one of the two now-defunct teams was James Silas of Stephen F. Austin State University that was drafted in the sixth round of the 1972 ABA draft by the Pittsburgh Condors; after being waived by the Houston Rockets of the rivaling NBA during their preseason period, head coach Babe McCarthy would give Silas a chance on joining their roster, with him later being a key member of their roster for not just their final years in the ABA, but also the franchise's first few seasons while in the NBA and being the only former Chaparrals player to have his number retired by the San Antonio Spurs (as well as one of two ABA players to have their number retired by the franchise alongside George Gervin of the Spurs).

== Roster ==
1972–73 Dallas Chaparrals roster
Players

| Pos. | No. | Player | Height | Weight | DOB | From |
|---|---|---|---|---|---|---|
| PF | | Art Becker | 6 ft 7 in (2.01 m) | 205 lb (93 kg) | January 12, 1942 | Arizona State |
| C | 25 | Coby Dietrick | 6 ft 10 in (2.08 m) | 220 lb (100 kg) | July 23, 1948 | San José State |
| SF | 15 | Ron Franz | 6 ft 7 in (2.01 m) | 205 lb (93 kg) | October 20, 1945 | Kansas |
| SF | 15 | Shaler Halimon | 6 ft 5 in (1.96 m) | 199 lb (90 kg) | March 30, 1945 | Utah State |
| PG | 11 | Joe Hamilton | 5 ft 10 in (1.78 m) | 160 lb (73 kg) | July 5, 1948 | North Texas |
| SF | 42 | Collis Jones | 6 ft 7 in (2.01 m) | 203 lb (92 kg) | July 3, 1949 | Notre Dame |
| PG | 23 | Larry Jones | 6 ft 2 in (1.88 m) | 180 lb (82 kg) | September 22, 1942 | Toledo |
| PG | | Nick Jones | 6 ft 2 in (1.88 m) | 190 lb (86 kg) | March 28, 1945 | Oregon |
| SF | 33 | Rich Jones | 6 ft 6 in (1.98 m) | 220 lb (100 kg) | December 27, 1946 | Memphis |
| SG | 23 | Steve Jones | 6 ft 5 in (1.96 m) | 205 lb (93 kg) | October 17, 1942 | Oregon |
| PF | 50 | Goo Kennedy | 6 ft 5 in (1.96 m) | 205 lb (93 kg) | August 23, 1949 | TCU |
| PF | 54 | Mike Maloy | 6 ft 7 in (2.01 m) | 215 lb (98 kg) | May 10, 1949 | Davidson |
| C | 24 | Bob Netolicky | 6 ft 9 in (2.06 m) | 220 lb (100 kg) | August 2, 1942 | Drake |
| SG | 13 | Gene Phillips | 6 ft 4 in (1.93 m) | 175 lb (79 kg) | October 25, 1948 | SMU |
| SG | 13 | James Silas | 6 ft 1 in (1.85 m) | 180 lb (82 kg) | February 11, 1949 | Stephen F. Austin |
| SG | 21 | Skeeter Swift | 6 ft 3 in (1.91 m) | 204 lb (93 kg) | June 19, 1946 | East Tennessee State |
| PF | 40 | Ansley Truitt | 6 ft 9 in (2.06 m) | 215 lb (98 kg) | August 24, 1950 | California |
| SG | 23 | Bob Warren | 6 ft 5 in (1.96 m) | 190 lb (86 kg) | July 17, 1946 | Vanderbilt |

Coaches
Head coach
- Babe McCarthy / Dave Brown

Legend
- (DP) Unsigned draft pick
- (FA) Free agent
- (S) Suspended
- Injured

== Final standings ==
=== Western Division ===
| Team | W | L | % | GB |
|---|---|---|---|---|
| Utah Stars | 55 | 29 | .655 | - |
| Indiana Pacers | 51 | 33 | .607 | 4 |
| Denver Rockets | 47 | 37 | .560 | 8 |
| San Diego Conquistadors | 30 | 54 | .357 | 25 |
| Dallas Chaparrals | 28 | 56 | .333 | 27 |

== Awards and honors ==
1973 ABA All-Star Game selections (game played on February 6, 1973)

- Rich Jones
