= Dave Brown (basketball) =

American basketball coach

David Charles Brown (February 22, 1933 – June 15, 2009) was an American basketball coach who briefly coached the Dallas Chaparrals of the American Basketball Association in 1973. He was born in Green Bay, Wisconsin and graduated from Edgewood High School of the Sacred Heart in Madison, Wisconsin.

== Head coaching record ==
=== ABA ===
Legend
| Regular season | G | Games coached | W | Games won | L | Games lost | W–L % | Win–loss % |
| Playoffs | PG | Playoff games | PW | Playoff wins | PL | Playoff losses | PW–L % | Playoff win–loss % |

| Team | Year | G | W | L | W–L% | Finish | PG | PW | PL | PW–L% | Result |
|---|---|---|---|---|---|---|---|---|---|---|---|
| Dallas | 1972–73 | 12 | 4 | 8 | .333 | (interim) | — | — | — | — | — |
