= 1968–69 Dallas Chaparrals season =

- Head coach: Cliff Hagan
- Arena: Moody Coliseum; Dallas Memorial Auditorium

Results
- Record: 41–37 (.526)
- Place: Division: 4th (Western)
- Playoff finish: Division Semifinals (lost to the Buccaneers 3–4)

Local media
- Television: KDTV 39
- Radio: KRLD

The 1968–69 Dallas Chaparrals season was the second season of the Chaparrals in the American Basketball Association. Once again, the Chaps lost to the New Orleans Buccaneers in the playoffs, this time in the Western Division Semifinals by seven games.

== Roster ==
1968–69 Dallas Chaparrals roster
Players

Pos.	No.	Player	Height	Weight	DOB	From
SG	24	Charles Beasley	6 ft 5 in (1.96 m)	190 lb (86 kg)	1945–09–23	SMU
PF	44	John Beasley	6 ft 9 in (2.06 m)	225 lb (102 kg)	1944–02–05	Texas A&M
PF	22	Bob Bedell	6 ft 7 in (2.01 m)	205 lb (93 kg)	1944–06–26	Stanford
PG	6	Spider Bennett	6 ft 3 in (1.91 m)	190 lb (86 kg)	1943–08–04	Winston-Salem State
SG	12	Ron Boone	6 ft 2 in (1.88 m)	200 lb (91 kg)	1946–09–06	Idaho State
C	25	Larry Bunce	7 ft 0 in (2.13 m)	240 lb (109 kg)	1945–07–29	Utah State
PG	10	Glen Combs	6 ft 2 in (1.88 m)	185 lb (84 kg)	1946–10–30	Virginia Tech
SF	16	Cliff Hagan	6 ft 4 in (1.93 m)	210 lb (95 kg)	1931–12–09	Kentucky
G	11	Nick Jones	6 ft 2 in (1.88 m)	190 lb (86 kg)	1945–03–28	Oregon
C	43	Manny Leaks	6 ft 8 in (2.03 m)	225 lb (102 kg)	1945–11–27	Niagara
SF	31	Riney Lochmann	6 ft 6 in (1.98 m)	215 lb (98 kg)	1944–05–26	Kansas
C	43	Elton McGriff	6 ft 9 in (2.06 m)	225 lb (102 kg)	1942–08–21	Creighton
SF	35	Cincy Powell	6 ft 7 in (2.01 m)	220 lb (100 kg)	1942–02–25	Portland
C	55	John Smith	7 ft 0 in (2.13 m)	235 lb (107 kg)	1944–05–24	CSU Pueblo
PF		Jim Ware	6 ft 7 in (2.01 m)	210 lb (95 kg)	1944–05–02	Oklahoma City

Coaches
Head coach
- Cliff Hagan

Legend
- (DP) Unsigned draft pick
- (FA) Free agent
- (S) Suspended
- Injured

Roster

== Final standings ==
=== Western Division ===
Team	W	L	PCT.	GB
Oakland Oaks C	60	18	.769	-
New Orleans Buccaneers	46	32	.590	14
Denver Rockets	44	34	.564	16
Dallas Chaparrals	41	37	.526	19
Los Angeles Stars	33	45	.423	27
Houston Mavericks	23	55	.295	37

== ABA Playoffs ==
ABA Western Division Semifinals

Game	Date	Location	Score	Record	Attendance
1	April 5	New Orleans	106–129	0–1	3,765
2	April 7	New Orleans	108–122	0–2	3,525
3	April 10	Dallas	130–106	1–2	2,887
4	April 12	Dallas	107–114	1–3	5,482
5	April 14	New Orleans	123–112	2–3	4,517
6	April 15	Dallas	136–118	3–3	4,366
7	April 17	New Orleans	95–101	3–4	5,823

Chaparrals lose series, 4–3

== Awards and honors ==
1969 ABA All-Star Game selections (game played on January 28, 1969)

- John Beasley (named MVP)
