= 1969–70 Dallas Chaparrals season =

- Head coach: Cliff Hagan (22-21); Max Williams (23-18)
- Arena: Moody Coliseum; Dallas Memorial Auditorium

Results
- Record: 45–39 (.536)
- Place: Division: 2nd (Western)
- Playoff finish: Division Semifinals (lost to the Stars 2–4)
- Radio: KRLD

The 1969–70 Dallas Chaparrals season was the third season of the Chaparrals in the American Basketball Association. Hagan (who had been player-coach since the team's inception) was fired halfway through the season, and general manager Max Williams took over as the team's head coach for the rest of the season. The Chaps once again fell in the Western Division Semifinals, this time being upset by the Los Angeles Stars (who had only barely entered the 1970 ABA Playoffs that season despite them expecting another poor season on their ends). After this season ended, the team attempted to gain more fans within the state of Texas since they no longer had the Houston Mavericks as in-state rivals now by playing games in both nearby Fort Worth and Lubbock under the moniker of the Texas Chaparrals in an attempt to gain a more regional fanbase for their sake. This experiment was done for only one season, and the team rebranded themselves back to being the Dallas Chaparrals before the following season after this one started.

== Roster ==
1969-70 Dallas Chaparrals roster
Players

Pos.	No.	Player	Height	Weight	DOB	From
SG	24	Charles Beasley	6 ft 5 in (1.96 m)	190 lb (86 kg)	1945-09-23	SMU
PF	44	John Beasley	6 ft 9 in (2.06 m)	225 lb (102 kg)	1944-02-05	Texas A&M
PF	22	Bob Bedell	6 ft 7 in (2.01 m)	205 lb (93 kg)	1944-06-26	Stanford
SG	12	Ron Boone	6 ft 2 in (1.88 m)	200 lb (91 kg)	1946-09-06	Idaho State
C	50	Bob Christian	6 ft 10 in (2.08 m)	255 lb (116 kg)	1946-05-11	Grambling State
PG	10	Glen Combs	6 ft 2 in (1.88 m)	185 lb (84 kg)	1946-10-30	Virginia Tech
SF	16	Cliff Hagan	6 ft 4 in (1.93 m)	210 lb (95 kg)	1931–12–09	Kentucky
SG	34	Tom Hagan	6 ft 3 in (1.91 m)	185 lb (84 kg)	1947-01-29	Vanderbilt
SF	33	Rich Jones	6 ft 6 in (1.98 m)	220 lb (100 kg)	1946-12-27	Illinois
C	43	Manny Leaks	6 ft 8 in (2.03 m)	225 lb (102 kg)	1945-11-27	Niagara
SF	31	Riney Lochmann	6 ft 6 in (1.98 m)	215 lb (98 kg)	1944-05-26	Kansas
C	25	Bill McGill	6 ft 9 in (2.06 m)	225 lb (102 kg)	1939-09-16	Utah
SG	34	Maurice McHartley	6 ft 3 in (1.91 m)	185 lb (84 kg)	1942-08-01	North Carolina A&T
SF	35	Cincy Powell	6 ft 7 in (2.01 m)	220 lb (100 kg)	1942-02-25	Portland
F	34	Willie Scott	6 ft 5 in (1.96 m)	210 lb (95 kg)	1947-05-22	Alabama State
C	55	John Smith	7 ft 0 in (2.13 m)	235 lb (107 kg)	1944-05-24	CSU Pueblo

Coaches
Head coach
- Cliff Hagan / Max Williams

Legend
- (DP) Unsigned draft pick
- (FA) Free agent
- (S) Suspended
- Injured

Roster

== Final standings ==
=== Western Division ===
Western Division	W	L	PCT	GB
Denver Rockets *	51	33	.607	-
Dallas Chaparrals *	45	39	.536	6.0
Washington Caps *	44	40	.524	7.0
Los Angeles Stars *	43	41	.512	8.0
New Orleans Buccaneers	42	42	.500	9.0

Asterisk Denotes playoff team

== ABA Playoffs ==
ABA Western Division Semifinals

Game	Date	Location	Score	Record	Attendance
1	April 17	Dallas	103–115	0–1	4,513
2	April 18	Dallas	129–121	1–1	4,764
3	April 20	Los Angeles	116–104	2–1	971
4	April 22	Los Angeles	138–144	2–2	2,921
5	April 24	Dallas	139–146	2–3	5,128
6	April 26	Los Angeles	123–124	2–4	2,083

Chaparrals lose series, 4–2

== Awards and honors ==
1970 ABA All-Star Game selections (game played on January 24, 1970)

- Cincy Powell
- John Beasley
- Glen Combs
