= Bill Blakeley =

American basketball coach (1934-2010)

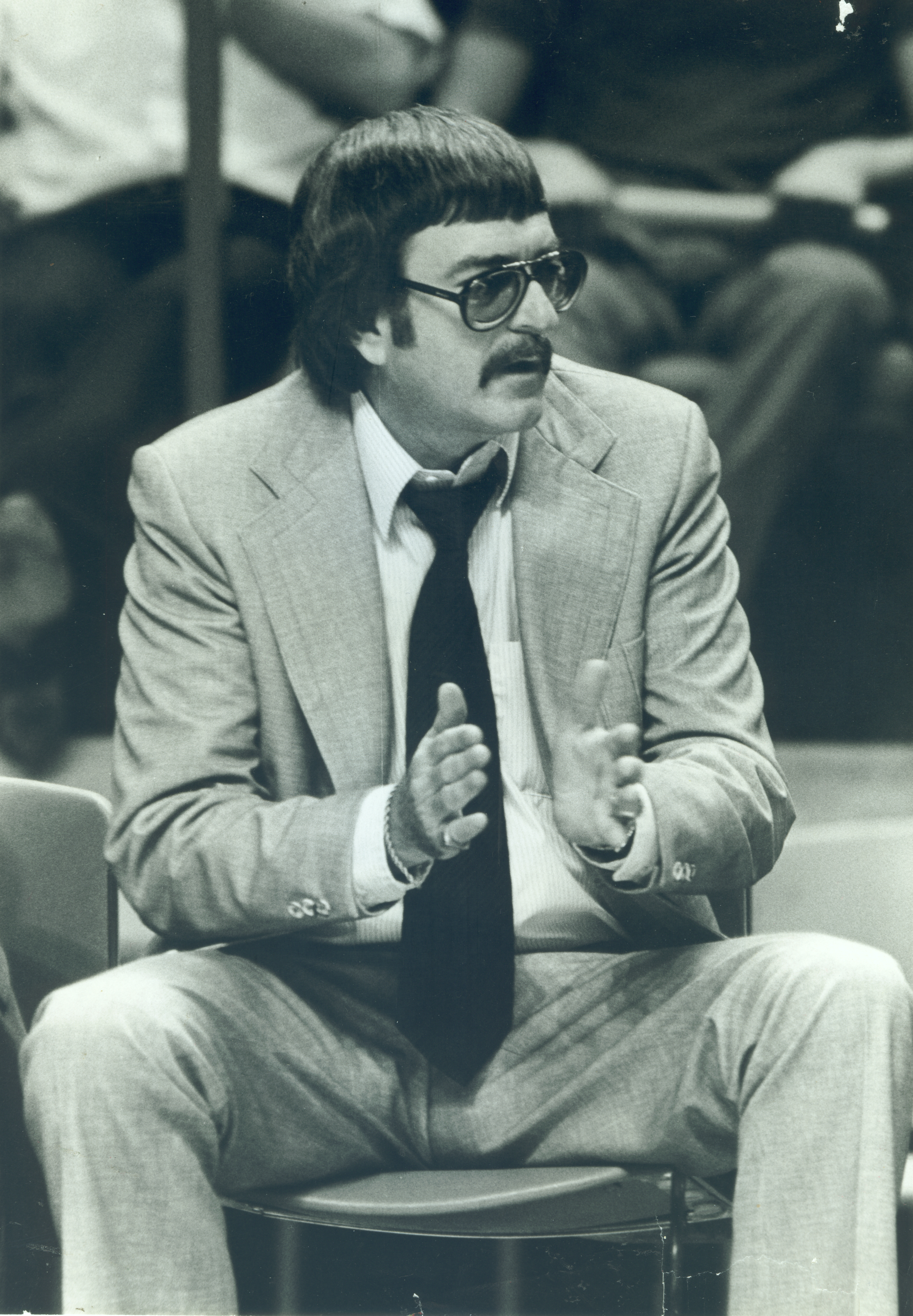
- Blakeley as coach of the North Texas Mean Green

Biographical details
- Born: June 13, 1934; Van Zandt County, Texas, U.S.
- Died: October 27, 2010 (aged 76)

Playing career
- 1955–1956: Abilene Christian
- Position: Forward

Coaching career (HC unless noted)
- 1957–1958: St. Mark's School of Texas (assistant)
- 1958–1966: St. Mark's School of Texas
- 1966–1970: Christian College of the Southwest
- 1970–1971: Dallas Chaparrals
- 1975–1983: North Texas

Accomplishments and honors

Awards
- Texas Sportswriters Association College Coach of the Year for Winter Sports (1977) Abilene Christian University; Sports Hall-of-Fame (1993); University of North Texas; Athletic Hall-of-Fame (2002)

Billy Buie Blakeley (June 13, 1934 – October 27, 2010) was an American basketball coach. He coached at the high school, college, and professional levels.

== Coaching career ==
=== High school (1957–1966) ===
Blakeley served as the head basketball coach for most of the 1957 season at Blackwell High School. Blakeley resigned on January 18, 1957. He worked as an assistant basketball coach at St. Mark's of Texas from 1957 to 1958. He became the head coach at St. Mark's next season and served there until 1966. Blakeley won four State Championships.

He also served as the head tennis coach while at St. Mark's, compiling an unprecedented record of 203–2 over 9 seasons.

=== NJCAA Division I (1967–1970) ===
Blakeley's 1967–68 team (CCSW's first year of varsity basketball), which included standout athlete Joe Hamilton, won the NJCAA Region 5 Tournament, earning the NJCAA Division I team an invitation to the National JUCO Championship in Hutchinson, Kansas. Blakeley talked Hamilton out of joining the Kentucky Wildcats and "put his name in lights" [at CCSW].

CCSW achieved a #1 ranking in the National Junior College Athletic Association poll during its 1970–71 season. During his 6-year tenure, his teams never lost 2 games in a row. His overall win–loss record was 125–24. Due to financial stress, CCSW dropped basketball after its 1969–70 season.

=== ABA (1970–1971) ===
On, April 6, 1970, the Dallas Chaparrals of the American Basketball Association hired Blakeley as Business Manager. The team also put him in charge of Player Relations and Recruiting, made him a designated assistant coach, and assistant to General Manager Max Williams. In November 1970, Williams resigned as coach and Bill Blakeley was named Head Coach as his replacement.

=== NCAA Division I (1975–1983) ===
On March 18, 1975, the sports media announced that Athletic Director Hayden Fry had named Blakeley as the new Head Coach for Men's Basketball at North Texas. The media reported it 10 days after Gene Robbins had resigned the position.

When he was hired, he told the media that, to beat North Texas, opponents will have to score at least 90 points. In his first season, he proceeded to turn around a team that was 6–20 in 1975, to 22–4 in 1976, averaging 96 points a game, the second highest in the nation. North Texas achieved its first and, as of 2010, only top 20 national ranking when the Associated Press Men's Basketball Poll ranked North Texas 20th on February 3, 1976. and 20th on February 10, 1976. The Eagles were invited neither to the NCAA tournament nor the NIT. Frustrated over the politics involved in getting invited to the NCAA Tournament, Blakeley conceded the only concrete argument the NCAA held against North Texas was that six of its games from the 1975–76 season were with teams outside of Division I; so, for the 1976–77 season, Blakeley beefed-up the schedule by dropping all non-Division I teams.

As an independent under Blakeley, North Texas had no conference tournament that entitled a winner an automatic berth to the NCAA Championships. North Texas had difficulty scheduling games with conference schools that did, including teams from the Southwest Conference, particularly nearby rival SMU, which, separated by 35 miles, offered strong attendance possibilities on a home-and-home basis. In 1976, Ken Wilson, then a sports writer for the Denton Record-Chronicle, surveyed schools from the Southwest, Big 8, Big Ten, and Southeastern Conferences and major independents. Most schools were not interested in scheduling North Texas basketball. They, according to Wilson, wanted giveaway games. North Texas, for the 1976 and 1977 seasons, was not a giveaway school. Wilson also inferred that SMU and TCU felt that they would gain little by beating North Texas, but might suffer in recruiting if they lost. In the spring of 1977, a time when North Texas was vying for membership in the Southwest Conference, then SMU Coach Sonny Allen, expressed disinterest in scheduling North Texas, killing the basketball home-and-home series.

In November 1976, Sports Illustrated declared, "The Eagles can fly; there is not a player on the team who can't dunk." "Junior-college transfer Charles McMillian, a 6'3" forward with a 22.5-point average, can perform a 42-inch vertical jump."

Blakeley hired Jimmy Gales, who served as assistant coach from 1975–76 to 1982–83 and kept Billy Tubbs, who had been an assistant coach at North Texas since the 1973–74 season. After his first season coaching with Blakeley, Tubbs won the head coaching job at Lamar University (1976–77 year). Blakeley hired Jim Moffitt in March 1976 to replace Tubbs. Gales went on to serve as the head coach of Mean Green basketball for seven seasons: 1986–87 to 1992–93.

With an overall 134–85 coaching record, as of 2010, Blakeley holds the third most wins and the fourth highest winning percentage of any men's basketball coach in North Texas history. None of five head coaches who have succeeded him (through 2010) have surpassed his overall winning percentage; though, Johnny Jones, a former head coach, surpassed his overall win record on December 31, 2009. Pete Shands, who coached North Texas Men's Basketball from 1935 to 1959, has the most wins with 217 over 22 seasons.

Blakeley also holds the all-time North Texas record for reaching 100 wins the fastest, reaching it in his 6th season (1980–81). Blakeley coached three consecutive 20-win seasons: 1975–76 (22–4); 1976–77 (21–6); 1977–78 (22–6) As of 2010, four players under Blakeley were among the North Texas Top 20 All-Time career scorers and the "North Texas 1000 Point Club." Blakeley established a tradition of draping a cloth sign on the back of his chair at court-side. During his first season, his sign read DON'T EXPECT MIRACLES. The next year it read MIRACLES NEVER CEASE? Other years it read FULL SPEED AHEAD, Phil 4:13 and UNDER CONSTRUCTION.

In 1991, the NCAA published an article that nationally ranked the top 38 most improved year-over-year team records since 1974 (the first year the history was compiled). Two teams tied for the most improved at 16-1/2 games. The third most improved team, at 16 games, was North Texas during Blakeley's first season (1975–76), finishing with a 22–4 record, verses 6–20 from the previous year. He accomplished his first-year feat with only one player added to the previous year's squad. As of 2010, the 16-game year-over-year improvement stands as a North Texas record dating back to the 1957–58 season.

== Head coaching record ==
Legend
Regular season	G	Games coached	W	Games won	L	Games lost	W–L %	Win–loss %
Playoffs	PG	Playoff games	PW	Playoff wins	PL	Playoff losses	PW–L %	Playoff win–loss %

=== High school ===
Blakeley's win–loss record at St. Mark's of Texas as assistant basketball coach (Mose Hale, head)
Season	Conference	Wins	Losses
1957–1958	Southwest Prep Conference	17	9
Blakeley's win–loss record at St. Mark's of Texas as head basketball coach
Season	Conference	Wins	Losses
1958–1959	Southwest Prep Conference	21	9
1959–1960	Southwest Prep Conference	24	9
1960–1961	Southwest Prep Conference	22	15
1961–1962	Southwest Prep Conference	30	7
1962–1963	Southwest Prep Conference	18	19
1963–1964	Southwest Prep Conference	23	11
1964–1965	Southwest Prep Conference	27	9
1965–1966	Southwest Prep Conference	33	1
Total (as head coach)		198	80

=== ABA ===
Team	Year	G	W	L	W–L%	Finish	PG	PW	PL	PW–L%	Result
Texas	1970–71	65	25	40	.385	4th in Western	4	0	4	.000	Lost Division semifinals

== Post-coaching career ==
In 1984 Blakeley stepped out of coaching after 31 years and was named President of Talent Sports International Inc. (the firm is inactive), a sports agency founded in 1984 by his son, Robin Buie Blakeley. As President, Blakeley became a certified sports agent through the National Basketball Players Association, working exclusively with basketball players. Blakeley first identified himself as a Player Agent when, in 1970, he helped Joe Hamilton negotiate a contract with the Dallas Chaparrals. He represented NBA first round draft picks and stars that included Karl Malone, Joe Dumars, Will Perdue, Spud Webb, Mookie Blaylock, Oliver Miller, Akeem Olajuwon, Michael Young, Randy White, Greg Anderson, Lorenzo Charles, Kenneth Lyons, Andrea Patterson and Tom Sewell (the first player he signed).

Blakeley later became a partner with Casterline, Vines, McElroy, Blakeley and Nalley of Dallas, a partnership that included Cecil W. Casterline III, Scott Casterline, son Jeff Blakeley, Vic Vines, W. Vann McElroy, and Jeff Nalley (the firm is inactive).

== Honors ==
It's quite an honor; but it's an honor that was won by the men on the
North Texas basketball team. They're the ones who had the successful
season. I never scored a point all season. They never even let me
shoot a free throw ... I'd trade it for a bid to the NCAA Playoffs.

— Bill Blakeley — commenting on his award, July 17, 1976
- 1976 — Texas Association of Basketball Coaches "Coach of the Year"
- 1976 — Texas Sportswriters Association "Coach of the Year for Winter Sports" (July 17, 1976)
- 1977 — Texas Sportswriters Association "College Coach of the Year for Winter Sports" (March 8, 1977)
- 1993 — Abilene Christian University (his alma mater) Sports Hall-of-Fame; during his junior year (1955–56), at forward, Blakeley was the team co-captain with Bill McGregory (center)
- 2002 — University of North Texas Athletic Hall-of-Fame

== Family ==
When you play in the H.O.T. Coliseum and dribble the ball, there's only
a 50–50 chance it will bounce back up to you." "It's so dark in the place,
the players need to wear those miner caps with lights on 'em"

— Bill Blakeley — two separate comments on
Baylor's Heart of Texas Coliseum
(some coaches really hated to play there)

Born to James Buie Blakeley and Levi Lucile Blakeley (née Williams), Bill Blakeley married Rosemary Harlow (b 1935) in Dallas, Texas, on September 3, 1955, during his senior year (her junior year) while both were attending Abilene Christian University. Blakeley was a graduate of A&M Consolidated High School in College Station, Texas, and had attended Texas A&M and Allen Military Academy in Bryan, Texas. Bill and Rosemary have three grown children Robin, Julie and Jeff.
