= Cliff Hagan =

American basketball player and coach (1931–2026)

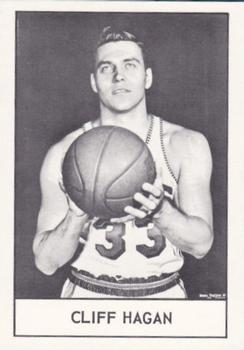
- Hagan in 1961

Personal information
- Born: December 9, 1931 Owensboro, Kentucky, U.S.
- Died: October 15, 2026 (aged 94) Lexington, Kentucky, U.S.
- Listed height: 6 ft 4 in (1.93 m)
- Listed weight: 210 lb (95 kg)

Career information
- High school: Owensboro (Owensboro, Kentucky)
- College: Kentucky (1950–1954)
- NBA draft: 1953: 3rd round, 22nd overall pick
- Drafted by: Boston Celtics
- Playing career: 1956–1969
- Position: Small forward
- Number: 6, 17, 16

Career history

Playing
- 1956–1966: St. Louis Hawks
- 1967–1969: Dallas Chaparrals

Coaching
- 1967–1970: Dallas Chaparrals

Career highlights
- NBA champion (1958); 5× NBA All-Star (1958–1962); 2× All-NBA Second Team (1958, 1959); ABA All-Star (1968); NCAA champion (1951); 2× Consensus first-team All-American (1952, 1954)

Career NBA and ABA statistics
- Points: 14,780 (17.7 ppg)
- Rebounds: 5,555 (6.6 rpg)
- Assists: 2,646 (3.2 apg)
- Stats at NBA.com
- Stats at Basketball Reference
- Basketball Hall of Fame
- Collegiate Basketball Hall of Fame

Clifford Oldham Hagan (December 9, 1931 – October 15, 2026) was an American professional basketball player. A 6 ft 4 in (1.93 m) small forward who excelled with the hook shot, Hagan, nicknamed "Li'l Abner", played his entire ten-year National Basketball Association (NBA) career (1956–1966) with the St. Louis Hawks. He was also a player-coach for the Dallas Chaparrals in the first two-plus years of the American Basketball Association's existence (1967–1970). Hagan was a five-time NBA All-Star and an ABA All-Star. He won an NCAA basketball championship in 1951 as a member of the Kentucky Wildcats and an NBA championship with the Hawks in 1958.

== College and military career ==
=== University of Kentucky ===
Hagan played college basketball at the University of Kentucky under legendary coach Adolph Rupp. As a sophomore in 1951, he helped Kentucky win the NCAA championship with a 68–58 victory over Kansas State.

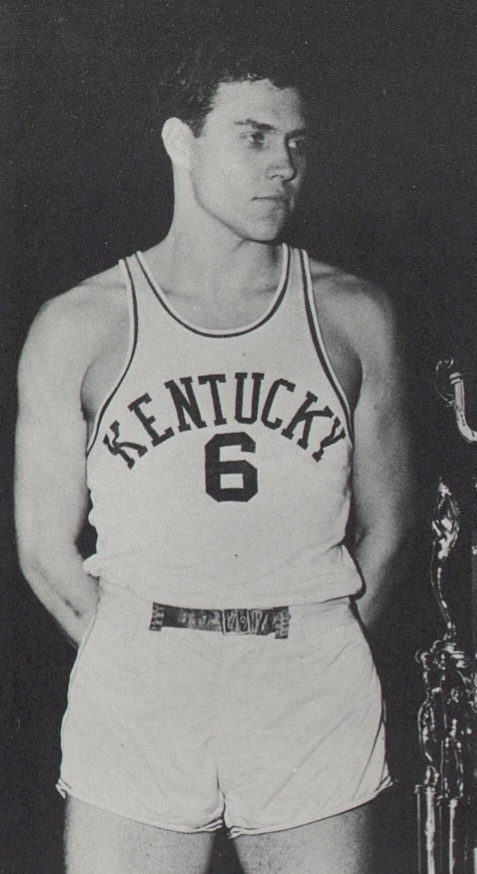
Hagan as a senior at UK.

In the fall of 1952, a point-shaving scandal involving three Kentucky players forced Kentucky to forfeit Hagan's senior season. Hagan graduated from Kentucky in 1953 and, as a result, became eligible for the NBA draft. Despite having graduated, and despite being drafted by the Boston Celtics, he returned to play at Kentucky for the 1953–1954 season. On December 5, 1953, Hagan set a Kentucky single-game record of 51 points; this performance would not be surpassed until 1970. After finishing the regular season with a perfect 25–0 record and a #1 ranking in the Associated Press, Kentucky was offered a bid into the NCAA tournament. However, then-existing NCAA rules prohibited graduate students from participating in post-season play; the Wildcats declined the bid because their participation would have forced them to play without Hagan and two of his teammates. Hagan averaged 24 points per game that season.

At Kentucky, Hagan had scored 1,475 points, which ranked him third in school history. He also grabbed 1,035 rebounds, which placed him second. In 1952 and 1954, he was named an All-American and was named First Team All-Southeastern Conference. His uniform number 6 was retired by the University of Kentucky.

=== U.S. Air Force ===
Hagan served in the U.S. military for two years after being drafted. In both of his years in the military (1954 and 1955), Hagan, stationed at Andrews Air Force Base, won Worldwide Air Force basketball championships.

== Professional career ==
=== National Basketball Association (NBA) ===
After his military service, Hagan and Ed Macauley were traded to the St. Louis Hawks for the draft rights to Bill Russell. In Game 6 of the 1957 NBA Finals on April 11, Hagan hit the game-winning buzzer beater shot to force Game 7 against the Boston Celtics, which is believed to be the first playoff buzzer-beater shot in NBA history.

In 1958, the Hawks won the NBA championship, defeating the Boston Celtics 4–2 in the NBA Finals. The Hawks won four Western Conference titles during Hagan's tenure with them. Hagan was named to five consecutive NBA All-Star Games from 1958 to 1962.

In The Breaks of the Game, David Halberstam wrote that Hagan was the only white star on the Hawks who welcomed African American teammates like Lenny Wilkens to the team and did not treat them with prejudice.

Hagan played 745 games over 10 NBA seasons. He scored 13,447 points for an 18.0 points per game average.

=== American Basketball Association (ABA) ===
In 1967, the Dallas Chaparrals of the newly formed ABA hired Hagan as a player-coach. Hagan became the oldest player in the ABA during that season due to his status with the team, as well as what could technically be considered the oldest undrafted ABA player in the league (in terms of players selected after the 1967 ABA draft came and went) by that time. He scored 40 points in his team's first game. He also played in the first ABA All-Star Game that season, becoming the first player to play in all-star games in both the NBA and ABA. He retired as a player three games into the 1969–70 season and remained as coach of the Chaparrals until midway into the season.

Hagan played in 94 ABA games and scored 1,423 points for a 15.1 points per game average.

=== University of Kentucky ===
In 1972, Hagan returned to the University of Kentucky as the school's assistant athletic director and took over the top job in 1975. He was forced to resign due to recruiting and eligibility violations in November 1988 and was replaced by Hagan's one-time Kentucky teammate C. M. Newton.

=== Legacy ===
Hagan was inducted into the Naismith Memorial Basketball Hall of Fame in 1978. He was the first former University of Kentucky player to be so honored.

In 1993, the University of Kentucky renamed its baseball field in honor of Hagan.

== Personal life and death ==
Hagan married his wife, Martha, on September 4, 1954.

Hagan died on October 15, 2026, at the age of 94.

== Career playing statistics ==
Legend
GP	Games played	GS	Games started	MPG	Minutes per game
FG%	Field goal percentage	3P%	3-point field goal percentage	FT%	Free throw percentage
RPG	Rebounds per game	APG	Assists per game	SPG	Steals per game
BPG	Blocks per game	PPG	Points per game	**Bold**	Career high
†	Won an NBA championship

=== NBA/ABA ===
==== Regular season ====
Year	Team	GP	MPG	FG%	FT%	RPG	APG	PPG
1956–57	St. Louis	67	14.5	.361	.690	3.7	1.3	5.5
1957–58†	St. Louis	70	31.3	.443	.768	10.1	2.5	19.9
1958–59	St. Louis	72	**37.5**	.456	.774	**10.9**	3.4	23.7
1959–60	St. Louis	75	37.3	.464	.803	10.7	4.0	**24.8**
1960–61	St. Louis	77	35.1	.444	.820	9.3	**4.9**	22.1
1961–62	St. Louis	77	36.2	.470	.825	8.2	4.8	22.9
1962–63	St. Louis	**79**	21.7	.465	.800	4.3	2.4	15.5
1963–64	St. Louis	77	29.6	.447	.813	4.9	2.5	18.4
1964–65	St. Louis	77	22.6	.436	.799	3.6	1.8	13.0
1965–66	St. Louis	74	25.0	.445	**.854**	3.2	2.2	13.7
1967–68	Dallas (ABA)	56	31.0	.489	.789	6.0	4.9	18.2
1968–69	Dallas (ABA)	35	16.5	.510	**.854**	2.9	3.5	11.1
1969–70	Dallas (ABA)	3	9.0	**.615**	.500	1.0	2.0	5.7
Career		839	28.7	.454	.799	6.6	3.2	17.7
All-Star		5	17.8	.324	1.000	3.0	2.2	6.2

==== Playoffs ====
Year	Team	GP	MPG	FG%	FT%	RPG	APG	PPG
1957	St. Louis	10	31.9	.361	.730	11.2	2.8	17.0
1958†	St. Louis	11	38.0	.502	.838	10.5	3.4	27.7
1959	St. Louis	6	**43.2**	**.512**	.833	**12.0**	2.7	**28.5**
1960	St. Louis	**14**	38.9	.422	.817	9.9	3.9	24.2
1961	St. Louis	12	37.9	.443	.812	9.8	4.5	22.0
1963	St. Louis	11	23.2	.464	.698	5.0	3.1	18.5
1964	St. Louis	12	32.7	.429	.833	6.2	4.8	16.3
1965	St. Louis	4	30.8	.453	.500	6.5	1.8	18.5
1966	St. Louis	10	20.0	.454	**.926**	3.4	1.8	11.3
1968	Dallas (ABA)	3	23.3	.378	.692	4.3	3.0	12.3
1969	Dallas (ABA)	2	22.5	.357	.800	3.0	**7.0**	9.0
Career		95	32.4	.451	.798	8.0	3.5	19.9

== Head coaching record ==
Legend
Regular season	G	Games coached	W	Games won	L	Games lost	W–L %	Win–loss %
Playoffs	PG	Playoff games	PW	Playoff wins	PL	Playoff losses	PW–L %	Playoff win–loss %

Team	Year	G	W	L	W–L%	Finish	PG	PW	PL	PW–L%	Result
Dallas	1967–68	78	46	32	.590	2nd in Western	8	4	4	.500	Lost in Division Finals
Dallas	1968–69	78	41	37	.526	4th in Western	7	3	4	.429	Lost in Division Semifinals
Dallas	1969–70	43	22	21	.512	(resigned)	—	—	—	—	—
Career		199	109	90	.548		15	7	8	.467	
