= Angelo Drossos =

American basketball executive (1928–1997)

Angelo Drossos (October 31, 1928 – January 9, 1997) was the owner of the San Antonio Spurs basketball team from 1973 to 1988, from its time in the American Basketball Association through the ABA-NBA merger and into its years in the National Basketball Association. Drossos received the NBA Executive of the Year Award in 1978 and was instrumental in bringing the three-point field goal to the NBA. He died at age 68 in 1997 after battling supranuclear palsy.
