= Dallas Chaparrals =

Basketball team in Lubbock, Texas

- Division: Western Division
- Founded: 1967
- History: Dallas Chaparrals (ABA); 1967–1970, 1971–1973; Texas Chaparrals (ABA); 1970–1971; San Antonio Spurs; 1973–present
- Arena: Moody Coliseum; Dallas Memorial Auditorium; Tarrant County Coliseum; Lubbock Municipal Coliseum
- Location: Dallas, Texas; Fort Worth, Texas; Lubbock, Texas
- Team colors: Red, white, blue

The Dallas Chaparrals were a charter member of the American Basketball Association (ABA). The team moved to San Antonio, Texas, for the 1973–74 season and were renamed the San Antonio Spurs. The Spurs joined the National Basketball Association (NBA) for the 1976–77 NBA season as a result of being one of four chosen ABA teams to be absorbed by the elder league following the completion of the ABA–NBA merger.

== Origin ==
The team's founding owners, unable to agree on a name for the franchise during an early organizational meeting at the Sheraton Dallas Hotel, named it for the Chaparral Club in which they met. The primary owner, Robert Folsom, was later the mayor of the City of Dallas. Minority owner, William Cothrum, was later Deputy Mayor Pro Tem of the City of Dallas. The team drew poor attendance and general disinterest in Dallas. They were lucky to attract crowds in the hundreds. During the 1970–71 season, the team became the Texas Chaparrals and an attempt was made to make the team a regional one, playing games in Fort Worth, at the Tarrant County Coliseum, as well as Lubbock, at the Lubbock Municipal Coliseum, but this proved a failure and the team returned full-time to Dallas in time for the 1971–72 season, splitting their games at Moody Coliseum and Dallas Convention Center Arena.

== Decline and the move ==
After missing the playoffs for the first time in their existence in the 1972–73 season, the team was put up for sale. After no credible offers surfaced, the team's original owners leased it to a group of 35 San Antonio businessmen, led by Angelo Drossos and Red McCombs. The deal included a three-year option to buy the team outright, after which it would revert to the Dallas group. The Drossos-McCombs group moved the team to San Antonio for the 1973–74 season and renamed them the San Antonio Spurs. San Antonio embraced its new team with open arms; the Spurs surpassed the Chaparrals' entire 1972–73 attendance in only 16 games. Realizing they had a runaway hit on their hands, Drossos and McCombs tore up the lease and completed the purchase after only one year, and the franchise has stayed in San Antonio to this day. However, Dallas would get its own NBA franchise in the form of the expansion Mavericks, who began play in the 1980–81 season.

== Basketball Hall of Famers ==
Dallas Chaparrals Hall of Famers
Players
| No. | Name | Position | Tenure | Inducted |
|---|---|---|---|---|
| 16 | Cliff Hagan ^{1} | SF | 1967–1969 | 1978 |

Notes:

- ^{1} Also served as head coach (1967–1970).

== Season-by-season ==
| Season | League | Division | Finish | Wins | Losses | Win% | GB | Playoffs | Awards | Head coach |
|---|---|---|---|---|---|---|---|---|---|---|
Dallas Chaparrals
| 1967–68 | ABA | Western | 2nd | 46 | 32 | .590 | 2 | Won Division Semifinals (Mavericks) 3–0; Lost Division Finals (Buccaneers) 4–1 | — | Cliff Hagan |
| 1968–69 | ABA | Western | 4th | 41 | 37 | .526 | 19 | Lost Division Semifinals (Buccaneers) 4–3 | John Beasley (ASG MVP) | Cliff Hagan |
| 1969–70 | ABA | Western | 2nd | 45 | 39 | .536 | 6 | Lost Division Semifinals (Stars) 4–2 | — | Cliff Hagan; Max Williams |
Texas Chaparrals
| 1970–71 | ABA | Western | 4th | 30 | 54 | .357 | 28 | Lost Division Semifinals (Stars) 4–0 | — | Max Williams; Bill Blakeley |
Dallas Chaparrals
| 1971–72 | ABA | Western | 3rd | 42 | 42 | .500 | 18 | Lost Division Semifinals (Stars) 4–0 | Tom Nissalke (COY) | Tom Nissalke |
| 1972–73 | ABA | Western | 5th | 28 | 56 | .333 | 27 | — | — | Babe McCarthy; Dave Brown |

== See also ==
- Bill Blakeley
- San Antonio Spurs
