= List of Kentucky Colonels players =

The following basketball players played with the Kentucky Colonels of the American Basketball Association from the team's founding in 1967 until the ABA-NBA merger in 1976.

- Henry Akin
- Dan Anderson
- Bird Averitt
- Jimmie Baker
- Howard Bayne
- Orbie Bowling
- Bill Bradley
- Jim Bradley
- Jim Caldwell
- M. L. Carr
- Darel Carrier
- Bill Chamberlain
- Wayne Chapman
- Steve Chubin
- Larry Conley
- Jimmy Dan Conner
- Bobby Croft
- Louie Dampier
- Ollie Darden
- Penny Ann Early
- John Fairchild
- David Gaines
- Mike Gale
- Artis Gilmore
- Travis Grant
- Tom Hagan
- Dennis Hamilton
- Joe Hamilton
- Dan Hester
- Les Hunter
- Dan Issel
- Billy James
- Stew Johnson
- Caldwell Jones
- Collis Jones
- Johnny Jones
- Wil Jones
- Kevin Joyce
- Ron King
- Tommy Kron
- Reggie Lacefield
- Wendell Ladner
- Manny Leaks
- Jim Ligon
- Sam Little
- Gene Littles
- Paul Long
- Maurice Lucas
- Randolph Mahaffey
- Ted McClain
- Jim McDaniels
- Eldon McGriff
- Gene Moore
- Rick Mount
- Allen Murphy
- Cotton Nash
- Johnny Neumann
- Jim O'Brien
- Bud Olsen
- Tom Owens
- Cincy Powell
- Mike Pratt
- Bobby Rascoe
- Kendall Rhine
- Red Robbins
- Joe Roberts
- Marv Roberts
- John Roche
- Pierre Russell
- Rubin Russell
- Walt Simon
- Sam Smith
- George Sutor
- Keith Swagerty
- Ron Thomas
- George Tinsley
- Jan van Breda Kolff
- Claude Virden
- Bobby Washington
- Al Williams
- Chuck Williams
- Gene Williams
- Tommy Woods
- Howie Wright
