= List of NBA players (B) =

This is a list of National Basketball Association players whose last names begin with B.

The list also includes players from the American National Basketball League (NBL), the Basketball Association of America (BAA), and the original American Basketball Association (ABA). All of these leagues contributed to the formation of the present-day NBA.

Individuals who played in the NBL prior to its 1949 merger with the BAA are listed in italics, as they are not traditionally listed in the NBA's official player registers.

== B ==
- Chris Babb
- Luke Babbitt
- Milos Babic
- Johnny Bach
- Dwayne Bacon
- Henry Bacon
- Ibou Badji
- Jim Baechtold
- Carl Baer
- Dalibor Bagarić
- John Bagley
- Marcus Bagley
- Marvin Bagley III
- Ace Bailey
- Amari Bailey
- Carl Bailey
- Gus Bailey
- James Bailey
- Thurl Bailey
- Toby Bailey
- Frank Baird
- Cameron Bairstow
- Bob Baker
- Jimmie Baker
- Mark Baker
- Maurice Baker
- Norm Baker
- Ron Baker
- Vin Baker
- Art Bakeraitis
- Adama Bal
- Patrick Baldwin Jr.
- Wade Baldwin IV
- Renaldo Balkman
- Cedric Ball
- Herb Ball
- LaMelo Ball
- Lonzo Ball
- Greg Ballard
- Herschel Baltimore
- Mohamed Bamba
- Paolo Banchero
- Desmond Bane
- Gene Banks
- Marcus Banks
- Walker Banks
- Ken Bannister
- Mike Bantom
- Dalano Banton
- Cat Barber
- John Barber
- Leandro Barbosa
- Steve Bardo
- J. J. Barea
- Andrea Bargnani
- Cliff Barker
- Tom Barker
- Charles Barkley
- Erick Barkley
- Don Barksdale
- Lou Barle
- Dominick Barlow
- Harrison Barnes
- Harry Barnes
- Jim Barnes
- Marvin Barnes
- Matt Barnes
- Scottie Barnes
- Dick Barnett
- Jim Barnett
- Nate Barnett
- Shannie Barnett
- John Barnhill
- Norton Barnhill
- Brooks Barnhizer
- Leo Barnhorst
- John Barr
- Mike Barr
- Moe Barr
- Andre Barrett
- Ernie Barrett
- Mike Barrett
- RJ Barrett
- Earl Barron
- Dana Barros
- Brent Barry
- Drew Barry
- Jon Barry
- Rick Barry
- Edward Bartels
- Vic Bartolome
- Will Barton
- Eddie Basden
- Jerry Baskerville
- Brandon Bass
- Paris Bass
- Tim Bassett
- Charles Bassey
- Maceo Baston
- Billy Ray Bates
- Emoni Bates
- Keita Bates-Diop
- Esteban Batista
- Michael Batiste
- Buck Batterman
- Tony Battie
- Shane Battier
- Jamison Battle
- John Battle
- Kenny Battle
- Dave Batton
- Lloyd Batts
- Nicolas Batum
- Damion Baugh
- Johnny Baum
- Frank Baumholtz
- Lonny Baxter
- Jerryd Bayless
- Elgin Baylor
- Howard Bayne
- Aron Baynes
- Sergei Bazarevich
- Kent Bazemore
- Darius Bazley
- Ed Beach
- Bradley Beal
- Al Beard
- Butch Beard
- Ralph Beard
- Charlie Beasley
- Jerome Beasley
- John Beasley
- Malik Beasley
- Michael Beasley
- Frank Beaty
- Zelmo Beaty
- Rodrigue Beaubois
- MarJon Beauchamp
- Byron Beck
- Corey Beck
- Ernie Beck
- Art Becker
- Moe Becker
- Tom Becker
- Bob Bedell
- William Bedford
- Reece Beekman
- Hank Beenders
- Don Beery
- Ron Behagen
- Elmer Behnke
- Bill Behr
- Marco Belinelli
- Byron Bell
- Charlie Bell
- Dennis Bell
- Jordan Bell
- Raja Bell
- Troy Bell
- Whitey Bell
- Walt Bellamy
- Ray Bellingham
- DeAndre' Bembry
- Irv Bemoras
- Leon Benbow
- Dragan Bender
- Jonathan Bender
- Jerrelle Benimon
- Benoit Benjamin
- Corey Benjamin
- Emil Benko
- Anthony Bennett
- Elmer Bennett
- Mario Bennett
- Mel Bennett
- Spider Bennett
- Tony Bennett
- Wesley Bennett
- Winston Bennett
- David Benoit
- Al Benson
- Keith Benson
- Kent Benson
- Ben Bentil
- Gene Berce
- Beanie Berens
- Fred Beretta
- Gary Bergen
- Larry Bergh
- Joan Beringer
- Jules Bernard
- Connie Mack Berry
- Ricky Berry
- Walter Berry
- Dairis Bertāns
- Dāvis Bertāns
- Del Beshore
- Travis Best
- Don Betourne
- Patrick Beverley
- Saddiq Bey
- Tyler Bey
- Sim Bhullar
- Wes Bialosuknia
- Al Bianchi
- Johnny Bianco
- Hank Biasatti
- Henry Bibby
- Mike Bibby
- Eddie Biedenbach
- Andris Biedriņš
- Don Bielke
- Bob Bigelow
- Max Biggs
- Lionel Billingy
- Chauncey Billups
- Dave Bing
- Joe Binion
- Khem Birch
- Paul Birch
- Jabari Bird
- Jerry Bird
- Larry Bird
- Otis Birdsong
- Emmet Birk
- Jim Birr
- Gale Bishop
- Ralph Bishop
- Goga Bitadze
- Onuralp Bitim
- Bismack Biyombo
- Nemanja Bjelica
- Uwe Blab
- Anthony Black
- Charles Black
- Leaky Black
- Norman Black
- Tarik Black
- Tom Black
- Thermon Blacklidge
- Rolando Blackman
- Alex Blackwell
- Cory Blackwell
- James Blackwell
- Nate Blackwell
- DeJuan Blair
- Steve Blake
- Antonio Blakeney
- Will Blalock
- George Blaney
- Lance Blanks
- Ricky Blanton
- Andray Blatche
- Mookie Blaylock
- Eric Bledsoe
- Keljin Blevins
- Leon Blevins
- John Block
- Chuck Bloedorn
- Mike Bloom
- Jaron Blossomgame
- Corie Blount
- Mark Blount
- Vander Blue
- Ray Blume
- Nelson Bobb
- Tony Bobbitt
- Bucky Bockhorn
- Buddy Boeheim
- Bruce Boehler
- Tom Boerwinkle
- Keith Bogans
- Bogdan Bogdanović
- Bojan Bogdanović
- Ed Bogdanski
- Muggsy Bogues
- Andrew Bogut
- Etdrick Bohannon
- Bol Bol
- Manute Bol
- Jonah Bolden
- Marques Bolden
- Bill Bolger
- Leandro Bolmaro
- Joel Bolomboy
- Doug Bolstorff
- Bob Bolyard
- George Bon Salle
- Adem Bona
- Phil Bond
- Walter Bond
- Jordan Bone
- Dexter Boney
- Isaac Bonga
- Ron Bonham
- Herb Bonn
- Anthony Bonner
- Matt Bonner
- Al Bonniwell
- Butch Booker
- Devin Booker
- Melvin Booker
- Trevor Booker
- Josh Boone
- Ron Boone
- Calvin Booth
- Keith Booth
- Bob Boozer
- Carlos Boozer
- Cameron Boozer
- Curtis Borchardt
- Jake Bornheimer
- Lazaro Borrell
- Wally Borrevik
- Ike Borsavage
- Vince Boryla
- John Bosak
- Chris Bosh
- Jim Bostic
- Brandon Boston Jr.
- Lawrence Boston
- Sonny Boswell
- Tom Boswell
- Chris Boucher
- Lou Boudreau
- James Bouknight
- Ruben Boumtje-Boumtje
- Jamaree Bouyea
- Don Boven
- Cal Bowdler
- Brian Bowen
- Bruce Bowen
- Ryan Bowen
- Tom Bowens
- Harold Bower
- Anthony Bowie
- Sam Bowie
- Orbie Bowling
- Ira Bowman
- Ky Bowman
- Nate Bowman
- Wink Bowman
- Donnie Boyce
- Dennis Boyd
- Fred Boyd
- Ken Boyd
- Earl Boykins
- Harry Boykoff
- Winford Boynes
- Cedric Bozeman
- Steve Bracey
- Craig Brackins
- Gary Bradds
- Alex Bradley
- Alonzo Bradley
- Avery Bradley
- Bill Bradley (b. 1941)
- Bill Bradley (b. 1943)
- Charles Bradley
- Dudley Bradley
- Jaden Bradley
- Jim Bradley
- Joe Bradley
- Michael Bradley
- Shawn Bradley
- Tony Bradley
- Mark Bradtke
- Marques Bragg
- Torraye Braggs
- A. J. Bramlett
- Adrian Branch
- Elton Brand
- Terrell Brandon
- Malaki Branham
- Bob Brannum
- Brad Branson
- Jesse Branson
- Jarrell Brantley
- Jim Brasco
- Mike Bratz
- Carl Braun
- Christian Braun
- Ignas Brazdeikis
- Trevon Brazile
- Koby Brea
- Tim Breaux
- J. R. Bremer
- Pete Brennan
- Tom Brennan
- Irv Brenner
- Randy Breuer
- Corey Brewer
- Jamison Brewer
- Jim Brewer
- Ron Brewer
- Ronnie Brewer
- Primož Brezec
- Frank Brian
- Frank Brickowski
- Junior Bridgeman
- Bill Bridges
- Jalen Bridges
- Mikal Bridges
- Miles Bridges
- Al Brightman
- Amida Brimah
- Aud Brindley
- Isaiah Briscoe
- John Brisker
- Oshae Brissett
- Allan Bristow
- Tyrone Britt
- Wayman Britt
- Mike Brittain
- David Britton
- Izaiah Brockington
- Jon Brockman
- Ryan Broekhoff
- Jim Brogan
- Malcolm Brogdon
- Gary Brokaw
- Price Brookfield
- Clarence Brookins
- Aaron Brooks
- Armoni Brooks
- Dillon Brooks
- Keion Brooks Jr.
- Kevin Brooks
- MarShon Brooks
- Michael Brooks
- Scott Brooks
- Johni Broome
- Andre Brown
- Anthony Brown
- Bill Brown
- Bob Brown (b. 1921)
- Bob Brown (b. 1923)
- Bobby Brown
- Bruce Brown
- Charlie Brown Jr.
- Chaundee Brown
- Chucky Brown
- Damone Brown
- Darius Brown
- Darrel Brown
- Dee Brown (b. 1968)
- Dee Brown (b. 1984)
- Derrick Brown
- Devin Brown
- Ernest Brown
- Fred Brown
- George Brown
- Gerald Brown
- Greg Brown
- Harold Brown
- Hillery Brown
- Jabari Brown
- Jaylen Brown
- Jim Brown
- John Brown
- Kedrick Brown
- Kendall Brown
- Kobe Brown
- Kwame Brown
- Larry Brown
- Leon Brown
- Lewis Brown
- Lorenzo Brown
- Maliq Brown
- Marcus Brown
- Markel Brown
- Marshall Brown
- Mike Brown
- Mikel Brown Jr.
- Moses Brown
- Myron Brown
- P. J. Brown
- Randy Brown
- Raymond Brown
- Rickey Brown
- Roger Brown (b. 1942)
- Roger Brown (b. 1950)
- Rookie Brown
- Shannon Brown
- Stan Brown
- Sterling Brown
- Tierre Brown
- Tony Brown
- Troy Brown Jr.
- Jim Browne
- Bill Brownell
- Stanley Brundy
- Brian Brunkhorst
- George Bruns
- Jalen Brunson
- Rick Brunson
- Nicolás Brussino
- Carter Bryant
- Elijah Bryant
- Em Bryant
- Joe Bryant
- Kobe Bryant
- Mark Bryant
- Thomas Bryant
- Wallace Bryant
- Torgeir Bryn
- George Bucci
- Shaq Buchanan
- Joe Buckhalter
- Steve Bucknall
- Cleveland Buckner
- Greg Buckner
- Quinn Buckner
- Dave Budd
- Chase Budinger
- Walt Budko
- Jud Buechler
- Ken Buehler
- Kobe Bufkin
- Rodney Buford
- Matt Bullard
- Reggie Bullock
- Larry Bunce
- Greg Bunch
- Dick Bunt
- Bill Buntin
- Bill Bunting
- Luther Burden
- Pat Burke
- Trey Burke
- Roger Burkman
- Alec Burks
- Antonio Burks
- Kevin Burleson
- Tommy Burleson
- Jack Burmaster
- David Burns
- Evers Burns
- Jim Burns
- Scott Burrell
- Brayden Burries
- Art Burris
- Junior Burrough
- Bob Burrow
- Deonte Burton
- Ed Burton
- Tyler Burton
- Willie Burton
- Steve Burtt
- Don Buse
- Jerry Bush
- Sam Busich
- Dave Bustion
- Donnie Butcher
- Al Butler
- Caron Butler
- Charlie Butler
- Greg Butler
- Jackie Butler
- Jared Butler
- Jimmy Butler
- John Butler Jr.
- Mike Butler
- Mitchell Butler
- Rasual Butler
- Dwight Buycks
- Matas Buzelis
- Derrick Byars
- Andrew Bynum
- Will Bynum
- Walt Byrd
- Marty Byrnes
- Tommy Byrnes
- Mike Bytzura
