= 1969–70 Kentucky Colonels season =

- Head coach: Gene Rhodes
- Arena: Louisville Convention Center

Results
- Record: 45–39 (.536)
- Place: Division: 2nd (Eastern)
- Playoff finish: Division Finals (lost to the Pacers 1–4)

Local media
- Television: WAVE
- Radio: WHAS

The 1969–70 Kentucky Colonels season was the third season of the Colonels in the American Basketball Association. On April 15, 1969, the Colonels were bought by a group of Louisville investors that included H. Wendell Cherry, Bill DeWitt, J. David Grissom, Stuart P. Jay, David A. Jones, John Y. Brown, Jr., and Mike Storen. The Colonels won their first ever playoff series, beating the New York Nets in a tight seven-game series. In the Eastern Division Finals, with the chance to go to the ABA Finals, they lost to the eventual champion Indiana Pacers in five games

== Roster ==
1969–70 Kentucky Colonels roster
Players

Pos.	No.	Player	Height	Weight	DOB	From
SG	35	Darel Carrier	6 ft 3 in (1.91 m)	185 lb (84 kg)	October 26, 1940	Western Kentucky
SF	32	Wayne Chapman	6 ft 6 in (1.98 m)	190 lb (86 kg)	June 15, 1945	Western Kentucky
SG		Steve Chubin	6 ft 2 in (1.88 m)	200 lb (91 kg)	1944-02-08	Rhode Island
PG	10	Louie Dampier	6 ft 0 in (1.83 m)	170 lb (77 kg)	November 20, 1944	Kentucky
PF	42	Ollie Darden	6 ft 7 in (2.01 m)	235 lb (107 kg)	July 28, 1944	Michigan
SF	25	John Fairchild	6 ft 8 in (2.03 m)	205 lb (93 kg)	1943-04-28	BYU
SG	40	Tommy Kron	6 ft 5 in (1.96 m)	200 lb (91 kg)	February 28, 1943	Kentucky
PF	22	Jim Ligon	6 ft 7 in (2.01 m)	210 lb (95 kg)	February 22, 1944	Kokomo High School
G	40	Sam Little	6 ft 0 in (1.83 m)	180 lb (82 kg)	March 29, 1945	Delta State
C	54	Gene Moore	6 ft 9 in (2.06 m)	225 lb (102 kg)	July 29, 1945	Saint Louis
SF		Willie Murrell	6 ft 6 in (1.98 m)	225 lb (102 kg)	September 13, 1941	Kansas State
PF	24	Bud Olsen	6 ft 8 in (2.03 m)	220 lb (100 kg)	July 25, 1940	Louisville
SG	45	Bobby Rascoe	6 ft 4 in (1.93 m)	205 lb (93 kg)	July 22, 1940	Western Kentucky
SF	52	Sam Smith	6 ft 7 in (2.01 m)	230 lb (104 kg)	January 27, 1944	Kentucky Wesleyan
PF	25	Keith Swagerty	6 ft 7 in (2.01 m)	235 lb (107 kg)	October 30, 1945	Pacific
SF	34	George Tinsley	6 ft 5 in (1.96 m)	205 lb (93 kg)	September 19, 1946	Kentucky Wesleyan
PG	34	Bobby Washington	5 ft 11 in (1.80 m)	175 lb (79 kg)	July 11, 1947	Eastern Kentucky
SF	25	Gene Williams	6 ft 7 in (2.01 m)	235 lb (107 kg)	April 1, 1947	Kansas State

Coaches
Head coach
- Gene Rhodes

Legend
- (DP) Unsigned draft pick
- (FA) Free agent
- (S) Suspended
- Injured

Roster

== Final standings ==
=== Eastern Division ===
Eastern Division	W	L	PCT	GB
Indiana Pacers *	59	25	.702	-
Kentucky Colonels *	45	39	.536	14.0
Carolina Cougars *	42	42	.500	17.0
New York Nets *	39	45	.464	20.0
Pittsburgh Pipers	29	55	.345	30.0
Miami Floridians	23	61	.274	36.0

== ABA Playoffs ==
ABA Eastern Division Semifinals

Game	Date	Location	Score	Record	Attendance
1	April 17	Kentucky	118–122 (OT)	0–1	2,105
2	April 18	Kentucky	113–111	1–1	3,178
3	April 19	New York	99–107	1–2	2,106
4	April 22	New York	128–101	2–2	4,721
5	April 26	Kentucky	112–127	2–3	2,045
6	April 28	New York	116–113	3–3	5,039
7	April 29	Kentucky	112–101	4–3	2,876

Colonels win series, 4–3

ABA Eastern Division Finals

Game	Date	Location	Score	Record	Attendance
1	May 1	Indiana	114–110	1–0	5,939
2	May 2	Indiana	110–121	1–1	7,007
3	May 3	Kentucky	110–114	1–2	3,024
4	May 5	Kentucky	103–111	1–3	3,476
5	May 6	Indiana	103–117	1–4	5,453

Colonels lose series, 4–1

== Awards and honors ==
1970 ABA All-Star Game selections (game played on January 24, 1970)

- Louie Dampier
- Gene Moore
- Darel Carrier
- All-ABA Second Team selection
  - Louie Dampier
