= 1968–69 Kentucky Colonels season =

- Head coach: Gene Rhodes
- Arena: Louisville Convention Center

Results
- Record: 42–36 (.538)
- Place: Division: 3rd (Eastern)
- Playoff finish: Division Semifinals (lost to the Pacers 3–4)

Local media
- Television: WAVE
- Radio: WHAS

The 1968–69 Kentucky Colonels season was the second season of the Colonels in the American Basketball Association. Penny Ann Early became the first female player in the history of professional basketball, playing very briefly (literally one inbound pass by Early before the Colonels called a timeout) on November 27, 1968.

In the Eastern Division Semifinals, they lost to the Indiana Pacers 4 games to 3.

== Roster ==
1968–69 Kentucky Colonels roster
Players

Pos.	No.	Player	Height	Weight	DOB	From
PF		Henry Akin	6 ft 10 in (2.08 m)	225 lb (102 kg)	July 31, 1944	Morehead State
C	25	Dan Anderson	6 ft 10 in (2.08 m)	230 lb (104 kg)	February 15, 1943	Augsburg
C	24	Jim Caldwell	6 ft 10 in (2.08 m)	240 lb (109 kg)	January 28, 1943	Georgia Tech
SG	35	Darel Carrier	6 ft 3 in (1.91 m)	185 lb (84 kg)	October 26, 1940	Western Kentucky
SF	40	Wayne Chapman	6 ft 6 in (1.98 m)	190 lb (86 kg)	June 15, 1945	Western Kentucky
PG	10	Louie Dampier	6 ft 0 in (1.83 m)	170 lb (77 kg)	November 20, 1944	Kentucky
PF	42	Ollie Darden	6 ft 7 in (2.01 m)	235 lb (107 kg)	July 28, 1944	Michigan
PG	3	Penny Early	5 ft 3 in (1.60 m)	114 lb (52 kg)	May 30, 1943	Senn High School
SF	14	Johnny Jones	6 ft 7 in (2.01 m)	205 lb (93 kg)	March 12, 1943	DeMatha Catholic High School
	44	Reggie Lacefield	6 ft 5 in (1.96 m)	230 lb (104 kg)	April 10, 1945	Western Michigan
C	42	Manny Leaks	6 ft 8 in (2.03 m)	225 lb (102 kg)	1945-11-27	Niagara
PF	22	Jim Ligon	6 ft 7 in (2.01 m)	210 lb (95 kg)	February 22, 1944	Kokomo High School
SG	34	Paul Long	6 ft 2 in (1.88 m)	180 lb (82 kg)	February 8, 1944	Wake Forest
SF	25	Randy Mahaffey	6 ft 7 in (2.01 m)	210 lb (95 kg)	September 28, 1945	Clemson
C	25	Elton McGriff	6 ft 9 in (2.06 m)	225 lb (102 kg)	August 21, 1942	Creighton
C	54	Gene Moore	6 ft 9 in (2.06 m)	225 lb (102 kg)	July 29, 1945	Saint Louis
SG	45	Bobby Rascoe	6 ft 4 in (1.93 m)	205 lb (93 kg)	July 22, 1940	Western Kentucky
SF	52	Sam Smith	6 ft 7 in (2.01 m)	230 lb (104 kg)	January 27, 1944	Kentucky Wesleyan

Coaches
Head coach
- Gene Rhodes

Legend
- (DP) Unsigned draft pick
- (FA) Free agent
- (S) Suspended
- Injured

Roster

== Final standings ==
=== Eastern Division ===
Team	W	L	PCT.	GB
Indiana Pacers	44	34	.564	-
Miami Floridians	43	35	.551	1
Kentucky Colonels	42	36	.538	2
Minnesota Pipers	36	42	.462	8
New York Nets	17	61	.218	27

== ABA Playoffs ==
ABA Eastern Division Semifinals

Game	Date	Location	Score	Record	Attendance
1	April 8	Indiana	128–118	1–0	6,319
2	April 9	Indiana	115–120	1–1	6,789
3	April 10	Kentucky	130–111	2–1	4,235
4	April 13	Kentucky	105–104 (OT)	3–1	3,079
5	April 14	Indiana	97–116	3–2	5,612
6	April 15	Kentucky	89–107	3–3	4,633
7	April 17	Indiana	111–120	3–4	11,005

Colonels lose series, 4–3

== Awards and honors ==
1969 ABA All-Star Game selections (game played on January 28, 1969, in Louisville, Kentucky)

- Louie Dampier
- Darel Carrier
- Goose Ligon

Gene Rhodes was selected to coach the Eastern Conference

- All-ABA Second Team selection
  - Louie Dampier
