= Rice Owls men's basketball statistical leaders =

The Rice Owls men's basketball statistical leaders are individual statistical leaders of the Rice Owls men's basketball program in various categories, including points, assists, blocks, rebounds, and steals. Within those areas, the lists identify single-game, single-season, and career leaders. The Owls represent the Rice University in the NCAA Division I American Conference.

Rice began competing in intercollegiate basketball in 1914. However, the school's record book does not generally list records from before the 1950s, as records from before this period are often incomplete and inconsistent. Since scoring was much lower in this era, and teams played much fewer games during a typical season, it is likely that few or no players from this era would appear on these lists anyway.

The NCAA did not officially record assists as a stat until the 1983–84 season, and blocks and steals until the 1985–86 season, but Rice's record books includes players in these stats before these seasons. These lists are updated through the end of the 2020–21 season.

== Scoring ==
Career
Rk	Player	Points	Seasons
1	Michael Harris	2,014	2001–02 2002–03 2003–04 2004–05
2	Brent Scott	1,906	1989–90 1990–91 1991–92 1992–93
3	Travis Evee	1,885	2020–21 2021–22 2022–23 2023–24
4	Ricky Pierce	1,847	1979–80 1980–81 1981–82
5	Morris Almond	1,825	2003–04 2004–05 2005–06 2006–07
6	Elbert Darden	1,727	1975–76 1976–77 1977–78 1978–79
7	Tamir Jackson	1,684	2009–10 2010–11 2011–12 2012–13
8	Greg Hines	1,545	1983–84 1984–85 1985–86 1986–87
9	Torrey Andrews	1,535	1990–91 1991–92 1992–93 1993–94
10	Jason McKrieth	1,500	2001–02 2002–03 2003–04 2004–05

Season
Rk	Player	Points	Season
1	Morris Almond	844	2006–07
2	Ricky Pierce	805	1981–82
3	Marcus Evans	685	2015–16
4	Marcus Evans	665	2016–17
5	Quincy Olivari	654	2022–23
6	Michael Harris	639	2004–05
7	Egor Koulechov	637	2016–17
7	Torrey Andrews	632	1993–94
9	Robert Johnson	617	1998–99
10	Morris Almond	612	2005–06

Single game
Rk	Player	Points	Season	Opponent
1	Doug McKendrick	47	1965–66	Ga. Tech
2	Morris Almond	44	2006–07	Vanderbilt
	Kendall Rhine	44	1962–63	Arkansas
4	Temple Tucker	43	1955–56	Texas A&M
5	Morris Almond	42	2006–07	Utah
	Tom Robitaille	42	1958–59	Texas A&M
7	Bill Henry	41	1943–44	Texas A&M
	Kendall Rhine	41	1962–63	SMU
	Kendall Rhine	41	1963–64	LSU
10	Ricky Pierce	40	1981–82	Hawai'i
	Patrick Britton	40	2007–08	ECU
	Morris Almond	40	2005–06	SMU

== Rebounds ==
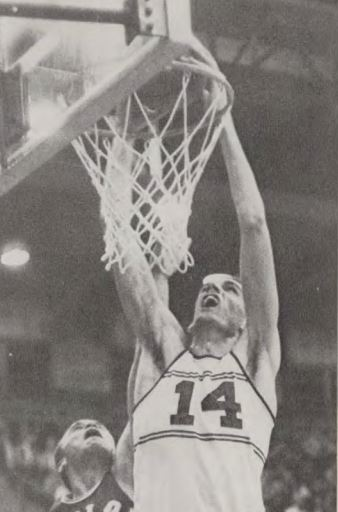
Kendall Rhine graduated as Rice's all-time scoring and rebounding leader in 1964.

Career
Rk	Player	Rebounds	Seasons
1	Max Fiedler	1,144	2019–20 2020–21 2021–22 2022–23 2023–24
2	Michael Harris	1,111	2001–02 2002–03 2003–04 2004–05
3	Brent Scott	1,049	1989–90 1990–91 1991–92 1992–93
4	Arsalan Kazemi	963	2009–10 2010–11 2011–12
5	Kendall Rhine	922	1961–62 1962–63 1963–64
6	Gene Schwinger	810	1951–52 1952–53 1953–54
7	Temple Tucker	768	1955–56 1956–57 1957–58
8	Kenneth Rourke	737	1988–89 1989–90 1990–91 1991–92
9	Adam Peakes	694	1991–92 1992–93 1993–94 1994–95
10	Joe Durrenberger	669	1953–54 1954–55 1955–56
	Tom Robitaille	669	1955–56 1956–57 1957–58 1958–59

Season
Rk	Player	Rebounds	Season
1	Michael Harris	363	2004–05
2	Arsalan Kazemi	351	2010–11
3	Gene Schwinger	344	1953–54
4	Arsalan Kazemi	340	2011–12
5	Kendall Rhine	334	1963–64
6	Kendall Rhine	319	1962–63
7	Egor Koulechov	312	2016–17
8	Temple Tucker	305	1955–56
9	Brent Scott	302	1990–91
10	Max Fiedler	296	2023–24

Single game
Rk	Player	Rebounds	Season	Opponent
1	Joe Durrenberger	30	1954–55	Baylor
2	Kendall Rhine	27	1962–63	Texas Tech
3	Michael Harris	24	2004–05	Hawaii
	Todd Schoettelkotte	24	1993–94	Southern

== Assists ==
Career
Rk	Player	Assists	Seasons
1	Max Fielder	566	2019–20 2020–21 2021–22 2022–23 2023–24
2	Max Guercy	503	2012–13 2013–14 2014–15 2015–16
3	Dana Hardy	502	1988–89 1989–90 1990–91 1991–92
4	Lorenzo Williams	442	2003–04 2004–05 2005–06 2006–07
5	D'Wayne Tanner	426	1986–87 1987–88 1988–89 1989–90
6	Tamir Jackson	387	2009–10 2010–11 2011–12 2012–13
7	Adam Peakes	353	1991–92 1992–93 1993–94 1994–95
	J.J. Polk	353	1994–95 1995–96 1996–97
9	Mike Wilks	348	1997–98 1998–99 1999–00 2000–01
10	Rashid Smith	341	2000–01 2001–02 2002–03 2003–04

Season
Rk	Player	Assists	Season
1	Max Guercy	182	2015–16
2	Max Fielder	174	2022–23
3	Lorenzo Williams	170	2005–06
4	Max Fielder	169	2023–24
5	Rashid Smith	159	2003–04
6	Dana Hardy	152	1991–92
7	Lorenzo Williams	146	2006–07
8	Rodney Foster	145	2008–09
	Max Guercy	145	2014–15
10	Dylan Ennis	144	2011–12

Single game
Rk	Player	Assists	Season	Opponent
1	Max Guercy	13	2014–15	Charlotte
2	Max Fiedler	12	2023–24	Wichita State
	Max Guercy	12	2015–16	Charlotte
	Max Guercy	12	2015–16	Marshall
	Rashid Smith	12	2003–04	Connecticut
	Rashid Smith	12	2003–04	UL-Lafayette
7	Max Fiedler	11	2022–23	UTSA
	Dylan Ennis	11	2011–12	Tulane
	Dylan Ennis	11	2011–12	East Carolina
	Lorenzo Williams	11	2005–06	Texas So.
	Lorenzo Williams	11	2005–06	UAB
	Dana Hardy	11	1990–91	Texas A&M
	Adam Peakes	11	1993–94	Sam Houston St.
	Michael Walton	11	1999–00	TCU

== Steals ==
Career
Rk	Player	Steals	Seasons
1	D'Wayne Tanner	291	1986–87 1987–88 1988–89 1989–90
2	Mike Wilks	186	1997–98 1998–99 1999–00 2000–01
3	Jason McKrieth	162	2001–02 2002–03 2003–04 2004–05
	Tamir Jackson	162	2009–10 2010–11 2011–12 2012–13
5	Arsalan Kazemi	154	2009–10 2010–11 2011–12
6	Max Guercy	146	2012–13 2013–14 2014–15 2015–16
7	Adam Peakes	144	1991–92 1992–93 1993–94 1994–95
8	Travis Evee	139	2020–21 2021–22 2022–23 2023–24
9	Michael Harris	137	2001–02 2002–03 2003–04 2004–05
10	Rashid Smith	133	2000–01 2001–02 2002–03 2003–04
	Bobby Tudor	133	1978–79 1979–80 1980–81 1981–82

Season
Rk	Player	Steals	Season
1	D'Wayne Tanner	95	1989–90
2	D'Wayne Tanner	94	1988–89
3	Marcus Evans	69	2015–16
	Arsalan Kazemi	69	2011–12
5	Tony Barnett	66	1984–85
6	Rashid Smith	64	2003–04
7	D'Wayne Tanner	61	1987–88
8	Jason McKrieth	59	2003–04
	Mike Wilks	59	2000–01
10	Mike Wilks	57	1998–99

Single game
Rk	Player	Steals	Season	Opponent
1	Rashid Smith	8	2003–04	Houston
2	D'Wayne Tanner	7	1986–87	Trinity
	D'Wayne Tanner	7	1988–89	E. New Mexico
	D'Wayne Tanner	7	1988–89	Baylor
	D'Wayne Tanner	7	1989–90	Texas Tech
	Adam Peakes	7	1993–94	Texas
	Arsalan Kazemi	7	2009–10	UCF

== Blocks ==
Career
Rk	Player	Blocks	Seasons
1	Yamar Diene	131	2000–01 2001–02 2002–03 2003–04
2	Max Fielder	125	2019–20 2020–21 2021–22 2022–23 2023–24
3	Michael Harris	119	2001–02 2002–03 2003–04 2004–05
4	Arsalan Kazemi	84	2009–10 2010–11 2011–12
5	Alex Bougaieff	82	1996–97 1997–98 1998–99 1999–00
6	Shaun Igo	79	1993–94 1994–95 1995–96 1996–97
7	Patrick Britton	75	2004–05 2005–06 2006–07 2007–08
8	Marquez Letcher-Ellis	72	2015–16 2016–17
9	Tony Barnett	70	1982–83 1983–84 1984–85
10	Andrew Drone	66	2013–14 2014–15 2015–16 2016–17

Season
Rk	Player	Blocks	Season
1	Omar Oraby	54	2011–12
2	Yamar Diene	45	2002–03
3	Dave Louwerse	40	1974–75
4	Max Fielder	38	2022–23
5	Quentin Millora-Brown	37	2018–19
	Michael Harris	37	2004–05
	Yamar Diene	37	2003–04
8	Marquez Letcher-Ellis	36	2016–17
	Marquez Letcher-Ellis	36	2015–16
	Alex Bougaieff	36	1998–99

Single game
Rk	Player	Blocks	Season	Opponent
1	Omar Oraby	6	2011–12	Marshall
	Michael Harris	6	2004–05	Murray State
	Dave Louwerse	6	1974–75	Texas A&M
