= 1967–68 Kentucky Colonels season =

- Head coach: John Givens (5–12); Gene Rhodes (31–30)
- Arena: Louisville Convention Center

Results
- Record: 36–42 (.462)
- Place: Division: 4th (Eastern)
- Playoff finish: Division Semifinals (lost to the Muskies 2–3)

The 1967–68 Kentucky Colonels season was the first season of the Colonels in the newly created American Basketball Association. The team was created on March 6, 1967, with Don Regan being awarded the team for $30,000. Later in the year, Joseph Gregory, Mamie Gregory and William C. Boone became owners.

The Colonels finished tied for fourth place in the ABA's Eastern Division with the New Jersey Americans, and a one-game playoff was to be played on March 23, the day after the Colonels had won the final game of the season over the Indiana Pacers 119–106. However, the conditions of the arena where the game was to be taken place were deemed to be in poor condition. The Colonels refused to play, and ABA Commissioner George Mikan ruled a forfeit in favor of the Colonels. In the Eastern Division Semifinals, they lost to the Minnesota Muskies 3 games to 2.

== Roster ==
1967–68 Kentucky Colonels roster
Players

Pos.	No.	Player	Height	Weight	DOB	From
PF	50	Howard Bayne	6 ft 6 in (1.98 m)	235 lb (107 kg)	July 28, 1942	Tennessee
C	52	Orbie Bowling	6 ft 10 in (2.08 m)	215 lb (98 kg)	March 21, 1939	Tennessee
SG	34	Bill Bradley	5 ft 11 in (1.80 m)	165 lb (75 kg)	June 16, 1941	Tennessee State
C	24	Jim Caldwell	6 ft 10 in (2.08 m)	240 lb (109 kg)	January 28, 1943	Georgia Tech
SG	35	Darel Carrier	6 ft 3 in (1.91 m)	185 lb (84 kg)	October 26, 1940	Western Kentucky
SG	40	Larry Conley	6 ft 3 in (1.91 m)	175 lb (79 kg)	January 22, 1944	Kentucky
PG	10	Louie Dampier	6 ft 0 in (1.83 m)	170 lb (77 kg)	November 20, 1944	Kentucky
SG	32	Smokey Gaines	6 ft 1 in (1.85 m)	170 lb (77 kg)	February 27, 1940	LeMoyne–Owen
PF	24	Stew Johnson	6 ft 8 in (2.03 m)	220 lb (100 kg)	August 19, 1944	Murray State
PF	22	Jim Ligon	6 ft 7 in (2.01 m)	210 lb (95 kg)	February 22, 1944	Kokomo High School
SF	25	Randy Mahaffey	6 ft 7 in (2.01 m)	210 lb (95 kg)	September 28, 1945	Clemson
SF	44	Cotton Nash	6 ft 5 in (1.96 m)	215 lb (98 kg)	July 24, 1942	Kentucky
SF	45	Bobby Rascoe	6 ft 4 in (1.93 m)	205 lb (93 kg)	July 22, 1940	Western Kentucky
C	14, 41	Kendall Rhine	6 ft 10 in (2.08 m)	230 lb (104 kg)	February 13, 1943	Rice
SF	42	Joe Roberts	6 ft 6 in (1.98 m)	214 lb (97 kg)	May 18, 1936	Ohio State
SG	32	Rubin Russell	6 ft 2 in (1.88 m)	180 lb (82 kg)	November 7, 1944	North Texas
C		George Sutor	6 ft 8 in (2.03 m)	235 lb (107 kg)	September 14, 1943	La Salle
PF	54	Tommy Woods	6 ft 7 in (2.01 m)	210 lb (95 kg)	June 10, 1943	East Tennessee State

Coaches
Head coach
- John Givens / Gene Rhodes

Legend
- (DP) Unsigned draft pick
- (FA) Free agent
- (S) Suspended
- Injured

Roster

== Final standings ==
=== Eastern Division ===
Team	W	L	PCT.	GB
Pittsburgh Pipers C	54	24	.692	–
Minnesota Muskies	50	28	.641	4
Indiana Pacers	38	40	.487	16
Kentucky Colonels	36	42	.462	18
New Jersey Americans	36	42	.462	18

== ABA Playoffs ==
1968 playoff game log
ABA Eastern Division Semifinals: 2–3 (home: 1–1; road: 1–2)

Game	Date	Team	Score	High points	High rebounds	High assists	Location Attendance	Series
1	March 24	@ Minnesota	L 102–115	Darel Carrier (29)	Carrier, Ligon, Rhine (8)		Metropolitan Sports Center	0–1
2	March 26	@ Minnesota	W 100–95	Louie Dampier (24)	Jim Caldwell (21)		Metropolitan Sports Center	1–1
3	March 27	Minnesota	L 107–116	Louie Dampier (32)	Jim Caldwell (9)		Louisville Gardens	1–2
4	March 29	Minnesota	W 94–86	Darel Carrier (29)	Jim Ligon (21)		Louisville Gardens	2–2
5	March 30	@ Minnesota	L 108–114	Louie Dampier (33)	Jim Caldwell (11)		Metropolitan Sports Center	2–3

1968 schedule

== Awards and honors ==
1968 ABA All-Star Game selections (game played on January 9, 1968)

- Louie Dampier
- Darel Carrier
- Randolph Mahaffey
- All-ABA Second Team selection
  - Louie Dampier
- All-ABA Rookie Team selection
  - Louie Dampier
