= Glendale College =

Glendale College may refer to:

- Glendale Community College (disambiguation)
- Glendale Career College
