= Thomas Becker =

Thomas or Tom Becker may refer to:

- Thomas Becker (bobsleigh) (born 1948), American Olympic bobsledder
- Thomas Becker (canoeist born 1967), German slalom canoeist competing in K-1
- Thomas Becker (canoeist born 1990), German slalom canoeist competing in C-2
- Thomas Albert Andrew Becker (1832–1899), American Catholic bishop
- Tom Becker (writer) (born 1981), British children's writer
- Tom Becker (baseball) (born 1975), Australian baseball pitcher
- Tom Becker (basketball) (1923–1991), American basketball player
