= Paul Long =

American basketball player (born 1944)

Personal information
- Born: February 8, 1944 (age 82) Louisville, Kentucky, U.S.
- Listed height: 6 ft 2 in (1.88 m)
- Listed weight: 180 lb (82 kg)

Career information
- High school: Waggener (Louisville, Kentucky)
- College: Virginia Tech (1963–1964); Wake Forest (1965–1967)
- NBA draft: 1967: 5th round, 45th overall pick
- Drafted by: Detroit Pistons
- Playing career: 1967–1971
- Position: Shooting guard
- Number: 10, 34, 36, 26, 5

Career history
- 1967-1968: Detroit Pistons
- 1968–1969: Kentucky Colonels
- 1969-1970: Detroit Pistons
- 1970-1971: Buffalo Braves
- 1980-1981: CVJM Birsfelden

Career highlights
- First-team All-ACC (1967); Second-team All-ACC (1966)
- Stats at NBA.com
- Stats at Basketball Reference

Paul Richard Long (born February 8, 1944) is a former NBA and ABA basketball player. He played professionally for the Detroit Pistons, Kentucky Colonels and the Buffalo Braves.

== Biography ==
Long was born in Louisville, Kentucky, and graduated from Waggener High School in Louisville. He attended Virginia Polytechnic Institute and State University in Blacksburg, Virginia and Wake Forest University in Winston-Salem, North Carolina.

Long was drafted with the second pick in the fifth round of the 1967 NBA draft by the Detroit Pistons. In his first NBA season, he averaged 3.6 points and 0.8 assists per game. Long then played for the Kentucky Colonels of the ABA in his second season, averaging 3.9 points and 1.3 assists per game. He played for the Pistons again in his third season, averaging 3.3 points and 0.7 assists per game. In his final NBA season, Long played for the Buffalo Braves, averaging 4.5 points and 0.8 assists per game.

Following two knee surgeries, Long began his coaching journey as a graduate assistant coach at Arizona State University in 1978. The following year he became an assistant coach at Central Arizona Community College. The desire to play professionally again, led him to Basel, Switzerland where he coached the youth team, the junior team and played on and coached the men's team. Long would eventually coach and play for CVJM Birsfelden in the Swiss LNB during the 1980–81 season.

After returning home, Long was hired as the head coach at Glendale Community College in Glendale, Arizona where he coached for five years. He has also served as the boy's basketball coach for Trevor G. Browne High School (1994–2007), Horizon High School (2007–11), and Tempe High School (2011–12).

Long currently offers private, in-person basketball training sessions focusing ononcentrated repetition, fundamental skills, attacking the rim, pick-and-roll execution, and defense in both Brandenburg and Ekron, Kentucky.

== Career statistics ==
Legend
GP	Games played	GS	Games started	MPG	Minutes per game
FG%	Field goal percentage	3P%	3-point field goal percentage	FT%	Free throw percentage
RPG	Rebounds per game	APG	Assists per game	SPG	Steals per game
BPG	Blocks per game	PPG	Points per game	**Bold**	Career high

=== NBA/ABA ===
==== Regular season ====
Year	Team	GP	MPG	FG%	3P%	FT%	RPG	APG	PPG
1967–68	Detroit	16	5.8	.451		.733	.9	.8	3.6
1968–69	Kentucky (ABA)	9	**9.1**	.225	–	.810	**1.0**	**1.3**	3.9
1969–70	Detroit	25	5.2	.452		.711	.4	.7	3.3
1970–71	Buffalo	**30**	7.1	**.475**		**.833**	**1.0**	.8	**4.5**
Career (NBA)		71	6.1	.464		.753	.8	.8	3.9
Career (overall)		80	6.5	.429	–	.765	.8	.8	3.9

==== Playoffs ====
Year	Team	GP	MPG	FG%	FT%	RPG	APG	PPG
1968	Detroit	1	4.0	1.000	–	.0	1.0	6.0
