= Wendell Bowman =

Wendell Bowman may refer to:

- Wendell P. Bowman (1847–1928), major general in the Pennsylvania National Guard
- Wink Bowman, Wendell "Wink" Bowman (1916–2001), American basketball player
