= Temple Tucker =

American basketball player

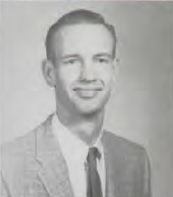
- Tucker's Campanile yearbook photo in 1958

Personal information
- Born: March 28, 1936 Haskell, Texas, U.S.
- Died: December 7, 2024 (aged 88) Houston, Texas, U.S.
- Listed height: 6 ft 10 in (2.08 m)
- Listed weight: 205 lb (93 kg)

Career information
- High school: Bowie (Bowie, Texas)
- College: Rice (1955–1958)
- NBA draft: 1958: 4th round, 29th overall pick
- Drafted by: Philadelphia Warriors
- Position: Center
- Number: 21

Career highlights
- Third-team All-American – NEA (1956); 2× Second-team All-SWC (1956, 1957)
- Stats at Basketball Reference

Temple Lafayette Tucker (March 28, 1936 – December 7, 2024) was an American basketball player, known for his All-American college career at Rice University in the 1950s. At 6'10", Tucker played the center position.

A native of Bowie, Texas, Tucker starred at Bowie High School, winning four state championships in four years while scoring 2,331 points. He then enrolled at Rice in the fall of 1954. Due to NCAA player eligibility rules of the time, Tucker could not play varsity basketball until his sophomore year in 1955–56. He made an immediate impact that season, which saw him average 22.1 points and 12.7 rebounds per game. The 22.1 scoring average was the second best in school history to that point, while his 12.7 rebounds led the Southwest Conference (SWC) for the season. In just his first eligible season, Tucker earned a third-team All-American selection by a major All-American voting body of the time (NEA). He was also named to the All-SWC second team.

Despite his drop in production, Tucker's junior season in 1956–57 saw him repeat in leading Rice in points (15.1) and rebounds (10.5) per game. He earned his second consecutive All-SWC second team honor.

During his senior season, Tucker averaged 13.5 points and 8.8 rebounds and was awarded the Billy Wohn Award as the team's most valuable player. For his career, Tucker scored 1,218 points (including a then school single-game record of 43) and grabbed 768 rebounds (then-second in school history behind Gene Schwinger's 810).

After his collegiate career ended, Tucker was selected in the 1958 NBA draft by the Philadelphia Warriors in the fourth round (29th overall). He opted to pursue a career as a life insurance agent instead, where he earned a lifetime membership into the Million Dollar Round Table.

Tucker died on December 7, 2024 in Houston, Texas.
