= John Givens (basketball) =

American basketball player and coach

John Givens (May 12, 1926 – December 8, 2009) was an American basketball player and coach.

Born and raised in McHenry in Ohio County, Kentucky, Givens played college basketball at Western Kentucky University for coach E.A. Diddle. He was drafted by the NBA's Rochester Royals in the sixth round of the 1950 draft.

Givens was a starting guard on the 1950–51 Sheboygan Red Skins of the National Professional Basketball League. The Red Skins finished with the league's best record at 29–16, after which the league dissolved. Givens was one of the league's most electric performers and finished seventh in NPBL scoring with 569 points in 44 games, a 12.9 per-game average.

Givens became the first head coach of the Kentucky Colonels during the American Basketball Association's first season in 1967–1968. Givens also became the first coach in the history of the ABA to be fired, after a 5–12 start. He was replaced as head coach of the Colonels by Gene Rhodes.

Givens later coached at Thomas Jefferson High School and Fern Creek High School, both in Jefferson County, Kentucky, before he retired.

Givens died on December 8, 2009, at his home in Louisville, Kentucky.

== Head coaching record ==
=== ABA ===
Legend
Regular season	G	Games coached	W	Games won	L	Games lost	W–L %	Win–loss %
Playoffs	PG	Playoff games	PW	Playoff wins	PL	Playoff losses	PW–L %	Playoff win–loss %

Team	Year	G	W	L	W–L%	Finish	PG	PW	PL	PW–L%	Result
Kentucky	1967–68	17	5	12	.294	—	—	—	—	—	(fired)

Preceded by team founded 1967	Kentucky Colonels Head Basketball Coaches; March 1967 – September 1967	Succeeded by Gene Rhodes
