= Penny Ann Early =

American athlete (1943–2023)

Personal information
- Nationality: American
- Born: May 30, 1943 Chicago, Illinois
- Died: June 23, 2023 (aged 80) Shelbyville, Tennessee
- Height: 5 ft 3 in (160 cm)
- Weight: 114 lb (52 kg; 8 st 2 lb)
- Basketball career
- Position: Guard
- Number: 3

Career history
- 1968: Kentucky Colonels
- Stats at Basketball Reference

Penny Ann Early (later Penny Ann Hill; May 30, 1943 – June 23, 2023) was an American athlete who achieved two notable firsts in her lifetime as she was the first female jockey to be licensed to ride parimutuel horse races and was the first woman ever to play in a professional men's basketball league in the United States, both during the 1960s.

== Early life and career ==
Being born and raised in Chicago, Illinois, she would attend Senn High School and graduate from the school in 1961. Once that was done, she would begin her career as a horse trainer, working with race horses early on in her life. Her first notable appearance to the public eye involving her work with horses would occur in 1965 in the show What's My Line?, showing up as the show's first guest for the episode she was on that also featured Barbra Streisand as the mystery guest and Tony Randall as a guest panelist, as well as became one of the last episodes to also feature Dorothy Kilgallen as a regular panelist before her suspicious death later in the year. During the episode, she would get three incorrect guesses from the panel (winning $15 from the show) before getting a correct answer on her occupation at the time, with host John Charles Daly mentioning afterward that she was working for and with a trainer named Tom Jolly and that she one day hopes to become a horse trainer herself in her later years.

Penny Early became notable as one of the first licensed female jockeys in the United States in 1968. In protest, male jockeys unanimously refused to ride in the first few races in which she was slated to compete at the Churchill Downs in Louisville, Kentucky to prevent her from competing.

In the midst of this heated controversy the Kentucky Colonels of the American Basketball Association signed Early to a short-term contract to play basketball for the men's team. Early had not played basketball at any level in life. Standing at just 5'3" tall and weighing a mere 112 pounds, she was also the smallest pro basketball player ever to compete. Management, including Colonels owners Joseph and Mamie Gregory, ordered coach Gene Rhodes to play Early in a game. Rhodes was not overly cooperative and protested to management.

Penny's moment came on Wednesday, November 27, 1968, against the Los Angeles Stars. Wearing a miniskirt and a turtleneck sweater with a number 3 on the back (to represent the three boycotted races at Churchill Downs), Early warmed up with the players during pre-game and sat on the bench with the team.

During the first half of play, during a timeout, Coach Rhodes sent Early to the scorer's table, where she officially checked into the game. In the Kentucky backcourt she took the ball out of bounds and inbounded it to teammate Bobby Rascoe. He then quickly called a timeout and the Colonels removed Early from the game to a mix of cheers and booing from the crowd of 5,345. Afterward, she signed hundreds of autographs to adoring onlookers.

After her brief stint in pro basketball, Early continued her career as a jockey. On April 19, 1969, she won the $10,000 Lady Godiva Handicap race at Suffolk Downs, a race that consisted entirely of seven female riders. Early rode in 12 races in 1969, none in 1970, and one in 1971.

== Later life and death ==
Early was so frustrated with maintaining her weight and getting enough mounts that she quit to become a trainer. In 1974, at the age of 30, she went on a strict diet and worked diligently to get her weight down; however, her comeback was short-lived when she broke her arm, ankle, wrist, and some ribs in a racing spill. Early continued to work with horses in California and later in 2021 in Shelbyville, Tennessee until her death. She died by suicide on June 23, 2023, at the age of 80.

== ABA statistics ==
=== Regular season ===
Year	Team	GP	GS	MPG	FG%	3P%	FT%	RPG	APG	SPG	BPG	PPG
1968–69	Kentucky	1	-	0.0	.000	.000	.000	0.0	0.0	-	-	0.0
