= Jim Caldwell (basketball) =

American basketball player (1943–2023)

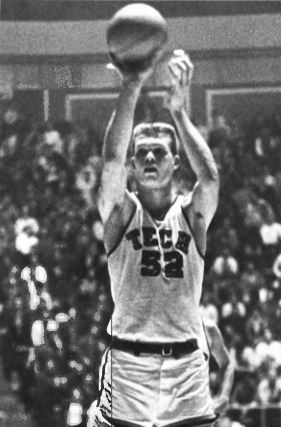
- Caldwell as a sophomore at Georgia Tech

Personal information
- Born: January 28, 1943 Durham, North Carolina, U.S.
- Died: April 6, 2023 (aged 80)
- Listed height: 6 ft 10 in (2.08 m)
- Listed weight: 240 lb (109 kg)

Career information
- High school: Lawrenceburg (Lawrenceburg, Indiana)
- College: Georgia Tech (1962–1965)
- NBA draft: 1965: 3rd round, 25th overall pick
- Drafted by: Los Angeles Lakers
- Playing career: 1965–1969
- Position: Center
- Number: 23, 41, 24

Career history
- 1965–1967: Wilmington Blue Bombers
- 1967: New York Knicks
- 1967: New Jersey Americans
- 1967–1969: Kentucky Colonels

Career highlights
- 2× EPBL champion (1966, 1967); 2× Second-team All-SEC (1963, 1964)

Career NBA and ABA statistics
- Points: 968 (7.1 ppg)
- Rebounds: 1,052 (7.7 rpg)
- Assists: 278 (2.0 apg)
- Stats at NBA.com
- Stats at Basketball Reference

James W. Caldwell (January 28, 1943 – April 6, 2023) was an American professional basketball player. He attended Lawrenceburg high school in Indiana before playing college basketball for the Georgia Institute of Technology.

Caldwell was selected by the Los Angeles Lakers in the third round (28th pick overall) of the 1965 NBA draft. He played for the Wilmington Blue Bombers of the Eastern Professional Basketball League (EPBL) from 1965 to 1967 and won EPBL championships with the Blue Bombers in 1966 and 1967. Caldwell played for the New York Knicks (1967–68) in the NBA for two games and for the New Jersey Americans (1967–68) and Kentucky Colonels (1967–68, 1968–69) in the ABA for 135 games.

Caldwell died from a heart condition on April 6, 2023, at the age of 80.

== Career statistics ==
Legend
GP	Games played	GS	Games started	MPG	Minutes per game
FG%	Field goal percentage	3P%	3-point field goal percentage	FT%	Free throw percentage
RPG	Rebounds per game	APG	Assists per game	SPG	Steals per game
BPG	Blocks per game	PPG	Points per game	**Bold**	Career high

=== NBA/ABA ===
==== Regular season ====
Year	Team	GP	MPG	FG%	3P%	FT%	RPG	APG	PPG
1967–68	New York (NBA)	2	3.5	.000		–	.5	.5	.0
1967–68	New Jersey (ABA)	12	21.8	.348	–	.455	7.1	.9	4.7
1967–68	Kentucky (ABA)	58	**27.3**	.426	**.167**	.618	**9.4**	**2.3**	**8.4**
1968–69	Kentucky (ABA)	**65**	19.0	**.438**	.111	**.674**	6.5	2.0	6.5
Career		137	22.5	.423	.133	.631	7.7	2.0	7.1

==== Playoffs ====
Year	Team	GP	MPG	FG%	3P%	FT%	RPG	APG	PPG
1967–68	Kentucky (ABA)	5	**35.0**	**.431**	–	**.700**	**11.8**	**2.6**	**11.6**
1968–69	Kentucky (ABA)	**7**	9.0	.267	–	.429	3.0	.7	1.6
Career		12	19.8	.394	–	.630	6.7	1.6	5.8
