= Mike Storen =

American sports executive (1935–2020)

Commissioner of the ABA
- In office 1973–1974
- Preceded by: Bob Carlson
- Succeeded by: Tedd Munchak

Personal details
- Born: Mark Storen Jr. September 14, 1935 Michigan City, Indiana, U.S.
- Died: May 7, 2020 (aged 84) Atlanta, Georgia, U.S.
- Spouse: Lynn
- Children: 3, including Hannah Storm
- Education: University of Notre Dame

Mark "Mike" Storen Jr. (September 14, 1935 – May 7, 2020) was an American sports executive in basketball, baseball, and football. After graduating from the University of Notre Dame and a stint in the US Marines, he began his career with the Chicago Zephyrs and became their promotions director after their move to Baltimore. He subsequently served as the first general manager of the Indiana Pacers from 1967 to 1969, before assuming the positions of GM and part-owner of the Kentucky Colonels. He became the commissioner of the American Basketball Association (ABA) in 1973, and played an instrumental role in the league's merger with the National Basketball Association (NBA) three years later.

== Early life ==
Storen was born on September 14, 1935, to Mark Storen and Marion Lois Riley, and grew up in Michigan City, Indiana. He graduated from the University of Notre Dame, where he played defensive back on their football team during his freshman year. He proceeded to serve in the Marine Corps, participating in their Toys for Tots program.

== Career ==
Storen career in sports management began in the early 1960s, when he successfully applied to become a ticket seller for the NBA's Chicago Zephyrs after seeing their job advertisement in a newspaper. He remained with the team after their move to Baltimore in 1963 and subsequently rose to the position of promotions director. Storen then became the business manager and assistant general manager of the NBA's Cincinnati Royals.

Storen became the first vice president and general manager of the Indiana Pacers of the ABA in 1967. He played a key role in selecting the team's name and colors, as well as in creating their first logo. Storen signed the team's first player in Roger Brown and hired the coach for the inaugural season in Larry Staverman; he fired Staverman nine games into the team's second season and replaced him with Bobby Leonard. Storen was also responsible for the trade for Mel Daniels for $75,000. Brown, Leonard, and Daniels would each later be named to the Basketball Hall of Fame. These moves paid off, as the team's nine seasons in the ABA saw them win three championships and reach five Finals.

In April 1969, Storen and others including – future Governor of Kentucky John Y. Brown, Jr. – bought the ABA's Kentucky Colonels franchise. Storen became president and general manager of the Colonels. Storen resigned his positions with the Colonels in 1973 as Brown bought out the other investors and assumed more operational involvement than Storen thought appropriate. Storen had a rocky relationship with the Louisville media after firing Colonels head coach Gene Rhodes, a favorite of the local reporters, due to Rhodes' allegedly mediocre performance. Rhodes succeeded Storen as general manager of the Colonels in 1973, when Storen became Commissioner of the ABA.

Storen became ABA commissioner in 1973. His initiative of having the fledgling league recruit undergraduate college stars like Julius Erving galvanized the drive toward ABA–NBA merger in 1976. Storen would leave this position to become an owner of the league's Memphis Sounds franchise with Isaac Hayes and Kemmons Wilson. After the 1974–75 season, the Sounds were sold and became the Baltimore Claws. Storen became president and general manager of the Atlanta Hawks of the NBA in 1977.

In the late 1980s and through the 1990s, Storen was commissioner of the Continental Basketball Association, Global Basketball Association, and Indoor Professional Football League. His final job in sports was with the Georgia Force in 2002.

== Personal life ==
Storen had three children, Mark, Duke, and Hannah, from his first wife, also named Hannah. He also had two stepdaughters from his second marriage to Lynn. His daughter Hannah Storm is a broadcast personality on ESPN, and also studied at Notre Dame. He had 14 grandchildren and was a relative of Major League Baseball player Drew Storen.

== Death ==
Storen died on May 7, 2020, at the Emory University Hospital in Atlanta, Georgia. He was 84, and had been suffering from a rare form of cancer. News of his death was first announced by his daughter Hannah via Twitter. A message of condolence conveyed by the Indiana Pacers praised Storen, stating that it was "impossible to overstate the impact [he] had on our franchise", from choosing the team's name, logo, and colors to assembling their staff and players. They also credited him for being "the foundation for the tradition of success the Pacers maintain to this day".

== Sources ==
- Pluto, Terry, "Loose Balls: The Short, Wild Life of the American Basketball Association" (Simon & Schuster, New York, 1990, ISBN 978-1-4165-4061-8
