= Johnny Jones (basketball, born 1943) =

American basketball player (born 1943)

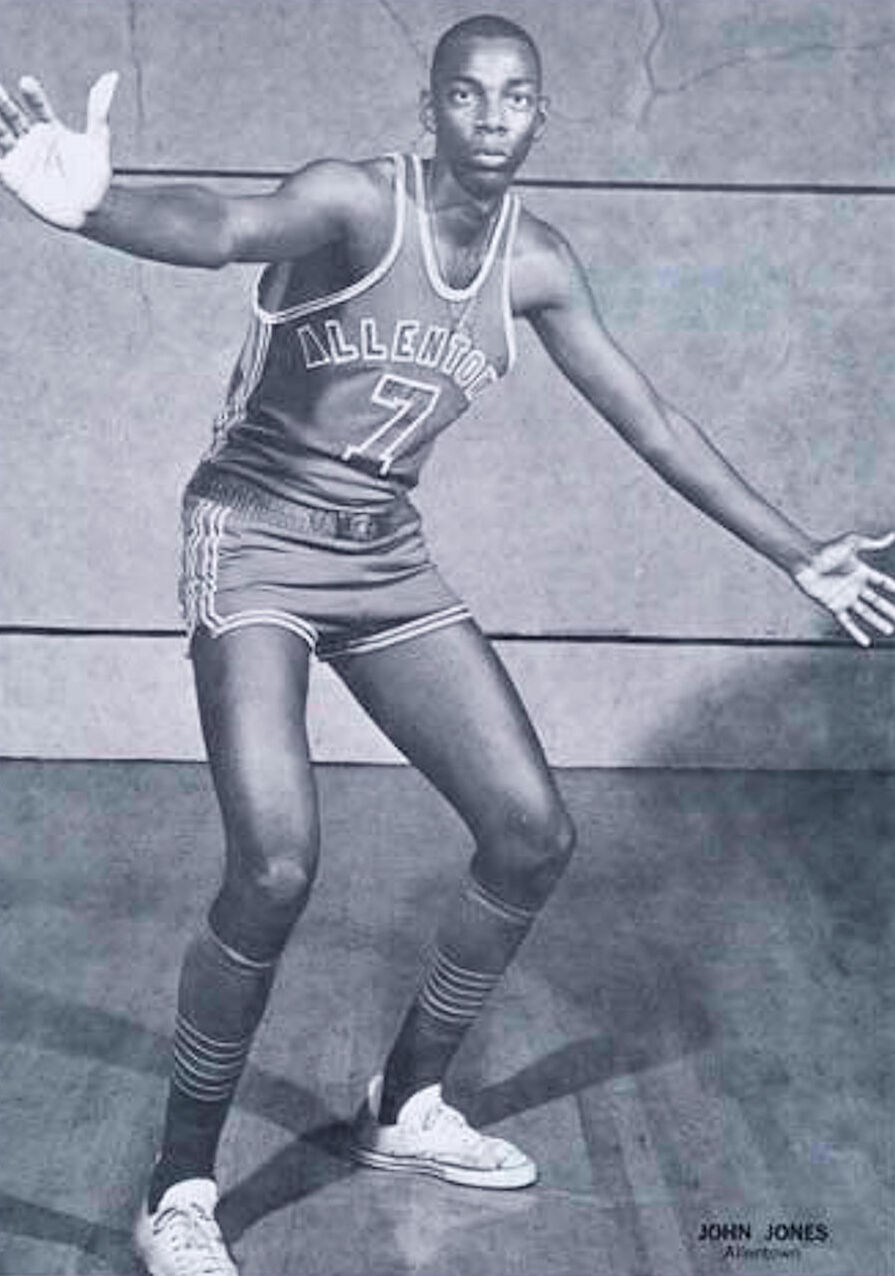
- Jones with the Allentown Jets in 1966

Personal information
- Born: March 12, 1943 (age 83) Washington, D.C.
- Listed height: 6 ft 7 in (2.01 m)
- Listed weight: 205 lb (93 kg)

Career information
- High school: DeMatha Catholic (Hyattsville, Maryland)
- NBA draft: 1966: 5th round, 46th overall pick
- Drafted by: Baltimore Bullets
- Playing career: 1965–1977
- Position: Small forward
- Number: 27, 14

Career history
- 1965–1967: Allentown Jets
- 1967–1968: Boston Celtics
- 1968–1969: Kentucky Colonels
- 1969–1970: Allentown Jets
- 1970–1974: Scranton Apollos
- 1974–1975: Allentown Jets
- 1975–1976: Trenton Capitols
- 1976–1977: Wilkes-Barre Barons

Career highlights
- NBA champion (1968); 2× EPBL/EBA champion (1970, 1971); All-EBA Second Team (1972)
- Stats at NBA.com
- Stats at Basketball Reference

John Jones (born March 12, 1943) is an American former professional basketball player.

Jones played for the Cal State Los Angeles Golden Eagles freshman team during the 1963–64 season. He joined the Allentown Jets of the Eastern Professional Basketball League (EPBL) for the 1965–66 season. Jones was selected in the 1966 NBA draft by the Baltimore Bullets.

Jones played one season (1967–68) in the National Basketball Association as a member of the Boston Celtics. He averaged 4.2 points per game and won an NBA Championship ring when the Celtics defeated the Los Angeles Lakers in the 1968 NBA Finals. He later played for the Kentucky Colonels of the American Basketball Association. Jones played in the EPBL / Eastern Basketball Association (EBA) for the Allentown Jets, Scranton Apollos, Trenton Capitols and Brooklyn Pros / Wilkes-Barre Barons from 1969 to 1977. He won EPBL/EBA championships with the Jets in 1970 and Apollos in 1971. Jones was selected to the All-Eastern Basketball Association (EBA) Second Team with the Scranton Apollos in 1972.

== Career statistics ==
Legend
GP	Games played	GS	Games started	MPG	Minutes per game
FG%	Field goal percentage	3P%	3-point field goal percentage	FT%	Free throw percentage
RPG	Rebounds per game	APG	Assists per game	SPG	Steals per game
BPG	Blocks per game	PPG	Points per game	**Bold**	Career high
†	Won an NBA championship

=== NBA/ABA ===
==== Regular season ====
Year	Team	GP	MPG	FG%	3P%	FT%	RPG	APG	PPG
1967–68†	Boston	**51**	9.3	.340		**.618**	2.2	.5	4.2
1968–69	Kentucky (ABA)	29	**15.5**	**.380**	.000	.577	**4.0**	**1.2**	**7.0**
Career		80	11.6	.358	.000	.597	2.9	.8	5.2

==== Playoffs ====
Year	Team	GP	MPG	FG%	FT%	RPG	APG	PPG
1968†	Boston	5	2.0	.500	–	.8	.0	1.2
