= George Sutor =

American basketball player

Personal information
- Born: September 14, 1943 Philadelphia, Pennsylvania, U.S.
- Died: August 29, 2011 (aged 67) Eau Claire, Wisconsin, U.S.
- Listed height: 6 ft 8 in (2.03 m)
- Listed weight: 235 lb (107 kg)

Career information
- High school: Father Judge (Philadelphia, Pennsylvania)
- College: La Salle (1962–1965)
- NBA draft: 1965: undrafted
- Playing career: 1965–1974
- Position: Center
- Number: 14, 15, 52, 43

Career history
- 1965–1966: Johnstown C-J's
- 1967–1968: Wilmington Blue Bombers
- 1967–1968: Kentucky Colonels
- 1968–1969: Minnesota Pipers
- 1969–1970: Carolina Cougars
- 1969–1970: Miami Floridians
- 1970–1971: Camden Bullets
- 1971–1972: Binghamton Flyers / Trenton Pat Pavers
- 1972–1973: Hamilton Pat Pavers
- 1973–1974: Hazleton Bullets

Career statistics
- Points: 380 (4.9 ppg)
- Rebounds: 404 (5.1 rpg)
- Assists: 30 (0.4 apg)
- Stats at Basketball Reference

George Joseph Sutor (September 14, 1943 – August 29, 2011) was an American professional basketball player who played three seasons in the American Basketball Association (ABA) as a member of the Kentucky Colonels (1967–68), the Minnesota Pipers (1968–69), the Carolina Cougars (1969–70), and the Miami Floridians (1969–70). He attended La Salle University.

A center, Sutor played six seasons in the Eastern Professional Basketball League (EPBL) / Eastern Basketball Association (EBA) for the Johnstown C-J's, Wilmington Blue Bombers, Camden Bullets, Binghamton Flyers / Trenton Pat Pavers and Hazleton Bullets.

After leaving basketball, he ran a restaurant in Somers Point, New Jersey named "Sutor's" before moving to Wisconsin in the late 1990s to run "Big Swede's". On August 5, 2011, Sutor was involved in an ATV wreck in which the vehicle flipped over, causing a serious head injury. 24 days later, Sutor died at the age of 67.

== Career statistics ==
Legend
GP	Games played	GS	Games started	MPG	Minutes per game
FG%	Field goal percentage	3P%	3-point field goal percentage	FT%	Free throw percentage
RPG	Rebounds per game	APG	Assists per game	SPG	Steals per game
BPG	Blocks per game	PPG	Points per game	**Bold**	Career high

=== ABA ===
==== Regular season ====
Year	Team	GP	MPG	FG%	3P%	FT%	RPG	APG	PPG
1967–68	Kentucky	1	5.0	–	–	–	1.0	.0	.0
1968–69	Minnesota	**64**	**13.8**	**.350**	–	**.623**	**5.4**	**.4**	**5.5**
1969–70	Carolina	11	12.3	.293	.000	.467	4.6	.2	2.8
1969–70	Miami	3	4.0	.000	–	.000	1.3	.3	.0
Career		79	13.1	.341	.000	.595	5.1	.4	4.8

==== Playoffs ====
Year	Team	GP	MPG	FG%	3P%	FT%	RPG	APG	PPG
1969	Minnesota	1	3.0	.000	–	.000	.0	.0	.0
