= Rubin Russell =

American basketball player

Personal information
- Born: November 7, 1944 (age 82) Fort Worth, Texas, U.S.
- Listed height: 6 ft 2 in (1.88 m)
- Listed weight: 180 lb (82 kg)

Career information
- High school: I.M. Terrell (Fort Worth, Texas)
- College: Labette CC (1963–1964); North Texas (1964–1967)
- NBA draft: 1967: 12th round, 133rd overall pick
- Drafted by: Seattle SuperSonics
- Position: Shooting guard
- Number: 14, 32

Career history
- 1967–1968: Dallas Chaparrals
- 1968: Kentucky Colonels
- Stats at Basketball Reference

Rubin B. "Rube" Russell Jr. (born November 7, 1944) is an American former professional basketball player. He was selected in the 1967 NBA draft but instead played in the American Basketball Association. Rubin played for the Dallas Chaparrals and Kentucky Colonels during the 1967–68 ABA season and scored 141 points.

== Career statistics ==
Legend
GP	Games played	GS	Games started	MPG	Minutes per game
FG%	Field goal percentage	3P%	3-point field goal percentage	FT%	Free throw percentage
RPG	Rebounds per game	APG	Assists per game	SPG	Steals per game
BPG	Blocks per game	PPG	Points per game	**Bold**	Career high

=== ABA ===
==== Regular season ====
Year	Team	GP	MPG	FG%	3P%	FT%	RPG	APG	PPG
1967–68	Dallas	**16**	9.8	.338	.154	.500	1.4	**.4**	4.1
1967–68	Kentucky	10	**11.2**	**.372**	**.222**	**.696**	**2.9**	.1	**7.6**
Career		26	10.3	.354	.182	.610	2.0	.3	5.4
