= Joe Roberts (basketball) =

American basketball player (1936–2022)

Personal information
- Born: May 18, 1936 Columbus, Ohio, U.S.
- Died: October 10, 2022 (aged 86) Oakland, California, U.S.
- Listed height: 6 ft 6 in (1.98 m)
- Listed weight: 214 lb (97 kg)

Career information
- High school: East (Columbus, Ohio)
- College: Ohio State (1957–1960)
- NBA draft: 1960: 3rd round, 21st overall pick
- Drafted by: Syracuse Nationals
- Playing career: 1960–1968
- Position: Power forward
- Number: 12, 42

Career history

Playing
- 1960–1963: Syracuse Nationals
- 1963–1964: Allentown Jets
- 1966–1967: Columbus Comets
- 1967–1968: Kentucky Colonels

Coaching
- 1974–1979: Golden State Warriors (assistant)
- 1989–1990: Los Angeles Clippers (assistant)

Career highlights
- As player: NCAA champion (1960); As assistant coach: NBA champion (1975)

Career NBA and ABA statistics
- Points: 1,255 (5.8 ppg)
- Rebounds: 1,075 (4.9 rpg)
- Assists: 123 (0.6 apg)
- Stats at NBA.com
- Stats at Basketball Reference

Joseph C. Roberts (May 18, 1936 – October 10, 2022) was an American professional basketball player who played three seasons in the National Basketball Association (NBA) and one season in the American Basketball Association (ABA). He played for the Syracuse Nationals and Kentucky Colonels from 1960 to 1968, having earlier played for Ohio State University's 1960 NCAA champions. After retiring from playing, he served as assistant coach of the Golden State Warriors and Los Angeles Clippers.

== Early life ==
Roberts was born in Columbus, Ohio, on May 18, 1936. He attended East High School in his hometown. He then studied biological studies and physical education at Ohio State University, where he played for the Ohio State Buckeyes from 1957 to 1960. He was a senior co-captain of the 1960 team – which included Jerry Lucas, John Havlicek, Mel Nowell, Bob Knight, and Gary Gearhart – that lost only three games en route to the 1960 NCAA title. Roberts was selected in the third round of the 1960 NBA draft by the Syracuse Nationals.

== Playing career ==
Roberts made his NBA debut on October 22, 1960, scoring six points to go along with three rebounds against the Philadelphia Warriors. He led the league in games played (80) the following year. He ultimately played three seasons with the Nationals, during which time there was an unspoken rule that restricted teams to three African American players. The franchise qualified for the NBA playoffs in each of those years, but lost to the Boston Celtics, Warriors, and Cincinnati Royals, respectively.

Roberts returned to his hometown of Columbus, Ohio for the 1966–67 season as the player/manager for the Columbus Comets of the newly formed and short-lived North American Basketball League (NABL). There, he played with former East High and Ohio State teammate Mel Nowell as well as former Ohio State alumni Dick Reasbeck, Gary Bradds, and Jim Doughty. Roberts did return to play for the Kentucky Colonels of the ABA for one season in 1967, the ABA's first year.

== Coaching career ==
After his playing career ended, Roberts became an assistant coach for Western Michigan in the Mid-American Conference, then Iowa in the Big Ten, before being an assistant for the NBA's Golden State Warriors and coach Al Attles for five years. The Warriors, led by MVP Rick Barry, won the NBA championship in 1975. Roberts coached the Warriors to their fourth win in the NBA finals against the Washington Bullets after Attles was ejected from the game.

== Personal life and death ==
Roberts was married to Celia for 65 years until his death. Together, they had three children.

Roberts died on the morning of October 10, 2022, at his home in Oakland, California. He was 86, and suffered from cancer prior to his death.

== Career statistics ==
Legend
GP	Games played	GS	Games started	MPG	Minutes per game
FG%	Field goal percentage	3P%	3-point field goal percentage	FT%	Free throw percentage
RPG	Rebounds per game	APG	Assists per game	SPG	Steals per game
BPG	Blocks per game	PPG	Points per game	**Bold**	Career high
*	Led the league

=== NBA/ABA ===
==== Regular season ====
Year	Team	GP	MPG	FG%	3P%	FT%	RPG	APG	PPG
1960–61	Syracuse	68	11.8	.370		.596	3.6	**.6**	4.7
1961–62	Syracuse	**80***	**20.5**	**.393**		.665	**6.7**	**.6**	**7.7**
1962–63	Syracuse	33	14.1	.372		**.686**	4.7	.5	5.5
1967–68	Kentucky (ABA)	37	15.2	.370	.333	.560	3.8	.4	3.7
Career (NBA)		181	16.1	.383		.648	5.2	.6	6.2
Career (overall)		218	15.9	.381	.333	.637	4.9	.6	5.8

==== Playoffs ====
Year	Team	GP	MPG	FG%	3P%	FT%	RPG	APG	PPG
1961	Syracuse	**5**	4.0	.300		–	.8	.0	1.2
1962	Syracuse	4	**16.0**	**.364**		**.714**	**7.0**	.0	**6.5**
1968	Kentucky (ABA)	**5**	12.6	.333	–	.333	3.0	**.2**	2.4
Career (NBA)		9	9.3	.344		.714	3.6	.0	3.6
Career (overall)		14	10.5	.340	–	.600	3.4	.1	3.1
