= Kendall Rhine =

American basketball player

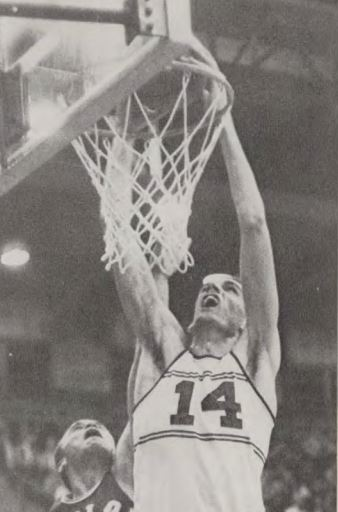
- Rhine as a junior at Rice

Personal information
- Born: February 13, 1943 Eldorado, Illinois, U.S.
- Died: March 16, 2022 (aged 79)
- Listed height: 6 ft 10 in (2.08 m)
- Listed weight: 230 lb (104 kg)

Career information
- High school: Dupo (Dupo, Illinois)
- College: Rice (1961–1964)
- NBA draft: 1964: 8th round, 64th overall pick
- Drafted by: St. Louis Hawks
- Position: Center
- Number: 14, 41, 44

Career history
- 1967–1968: Kentucky Colonels
- 1968–1969: Houston Mavericks

Career highlights
- 2× First-team All-SWC (1963, 1964); AAU All-American (1966)
- Stats at Basketball Reference

Kendall Lee Rhine (February 13, 1943 – March 16, 2022) was an American basketball player. He played in college for the Rice Owls, then as a professional in the American Basketball Association with the Kentucky Colonels and Houston Mavericks.

== Personal life and death ==
He married Gail Luton on January 19, 1968, with whom he had three children; they remained married until his death.

After his basketball playing days, he pursued a career in the propane industry, working with Pyrofax Gas and eventually as vice president of Suburban Propane.

Rhine died from cancer on March 16, 2022.

== Career statistics ==
Legend
GP	Games played	GS	Games started	MPG	Minutes per game
FG%	Field goal percentage	3P%	3-point field goal percentage	FT%	Free throw percentage
RPG	Rebounds per game	APG	Assists per game	SPG	Steals per game
BPG	Blocks per game	PPG	Points per game	**Bold**	Career high

=== ABA ===
==== Regular season ====
Year	Team	GP	MPG	FG%	3P%	FT%	RPG	APG	PPG
1967–68	Kentucky	52	10.6	.316	.000	.482	4.5	.6	2.4
1968–69	Houston	**73**	**29.0**	**.405**	.000	**.562**	**11.0**	**2.1**	**9.0**
Career		125	21.3	.388	.000	.548	8.3	1.4	6.3

==== Playoffs ====
Year	Team	GP	MPG	FG%	3P%	FT%	RPG	APG	PPG
1968	Kentucky	5	12.4	.294	–	.000	3.0	.8	2.0
