= Lorenzo Williams (basketball, born 1984) =

American basketball player

Personal information
- Born: November 8, 1984 (age 42) Killeen, Texas
- Listed height: 6 ft 2 in (1.88 m)
- Listed weight: 189 lb (86 kg)

Career information
- High school: Ellison (Killeen, Texas)
- College: Rice (2003–2007)
- NBA draft: 2007: undrafted
- Playing career: 2008–2021
- Position: Point guard

Career history
- 2008: Weißenhorn Youngstars
- 2008–2009: AB Cosmetics Pezinok
- 2009–2010: Gießen 46ers
- 2010–2011: Zalakerámia ZTE
- 2011: Khimik Yuzhny
- 2011–2013: Atomerőmű SE
- 2013–2014: Ventspils
- 2014–2016: Eisbären Bremerhaven
- 2016–2018: Lietkabelis Panevėžys
- 2018–2019: Neptūnas Klaipėda
- 2019–2021: Parma

Career highlights
- Latvian League champion (2014); Slovak League champion (2010)

Lorenzo Williams (born November 8, 1984) is an American former professional basketball player. Standing at 6 ft 2 in (1.88 m), he played at the point guard position. After four years at Rice University, Williams entered the 2007 NBA draft but was not selected in the draft's two rounds.

== High school career ==
Williams played high school basketball at Ellison High School, in Killeen, Texas.

== College career ==
Williams went to study at Rice University, where he played for the Rice Owls from 2003, in the Western Athletic Conference of the NCAA. The Owls, who were not represented in the national NCAA finals since 1970 managed to qualify for the National Invitation Tournament in 2004 and 2005 season, in which they each were eliminated in the first round. Subsequently, the Owls were transferred to the Conference USA in which, however, they could not improve their season budgets and missed nationwide appearances.

== Professional career ==
While Williams teammate Morris Almond was selected 25th overall by the Utah Jazz in the 2007 NBA draft, Williams had trouble finding a professional commitment. In November 2007, he was in the draft of the NBA Development League selected by the Anaheim Arsenal, but he eventually decided to start his professional career in Europe and completed no championship game in the D-League.

In January 2008, Williams signed his first professional engagement with Weißenhorn Youngstars in the Regionalliga. A few weeks later he joined AB Cosmetics Pezinok. With this club he won the Slovakian championship on the season. The following season they lost the decisive fifth game in the final series against the team from Nitra.

For the 2009–10 Basketball Williams returned to Germany, where he joined the highest in the Grupa Gießen 46ers from Giessen. Gießen who had held in the previous year only by obtaining a wildcard class, achieved with ten victories this season on the 14th place in the table and direct sporting league.

For the 2010–11 season Williams moved to Hungary, where he played for Zalakerámia ZTE from Zalaegerszeg. Before the end of the season, he left the club and joined the Ukrainian Basketball Superleague club Khimik Yuzhny. He left the club after a poor season with 16 wins in 48 games. Williams then returned to the Hungarian league and played for Atomerőmű SE from Paks. In his second season for this club Atomerőmű reached the play-off semi-final series were played against the defending Szolnoki Olaj KK, who played instead of the main round in Hungary in the Adriatic ABA league.

On July 16, 2013, Williams signed with BK Ventspils.

On June 20, 2014, Williams signed with Eisbären Bremerhaven of the Basketball Bundesliga.

On September 13, 2016, Williams signed with Lietkabelis Panevėžys of the Lithuanian Basketball League. He re-signed with the team on August 5, 2017.

Williams signed with Neptūnas Klaipėda on August 21, 2018. He joined Parma of the VTB United League in 2019 and averaged 8.1 points and 4.4 assists per game in 2019–20. Williams re-signed with the team on August 9, 2020.
