= Glendale Career College =

American for-profit college in California

- Type: Private For-Profit Education
- Established: 1946
- Founders: Dr. Byron Prout
- Officer in charge: Mitchell Fuerst
- Location: Glendale, California, U.S. 34°8′58.9″N 118°15′16.85″W
- Website: glendalecareer.com
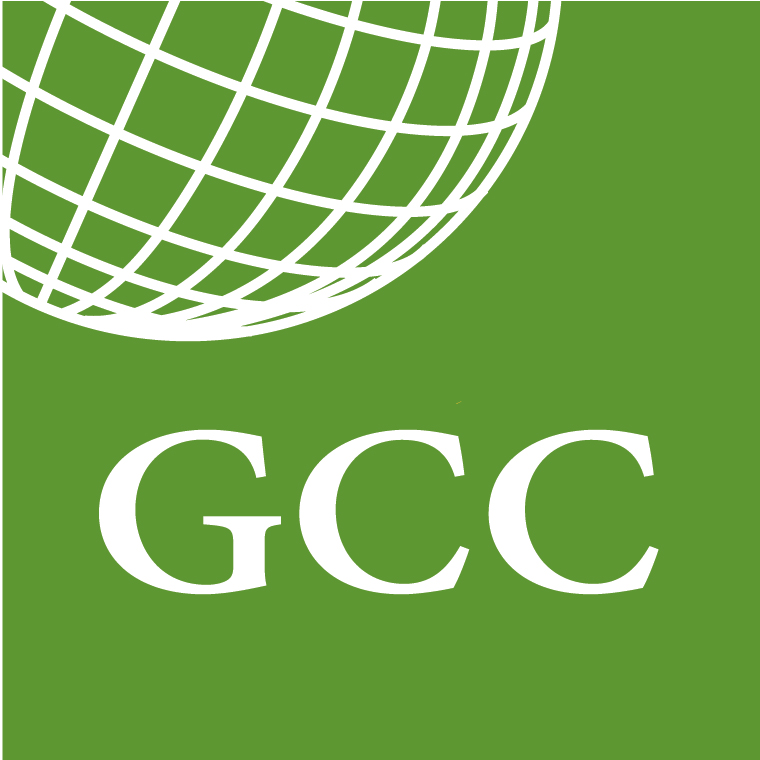

Glendale Career College is a private, for-profit college in Glendale, California. It was established in 1946 by Dr. Byron Prout. It is now owned and operated by the Fuerst family of Success Education Colleges.

== History ==
Originally established in 1946 by Dr. Byron Prout, under the name Glendale College of Business, the school has broadened its services to include programs for medical professions. It was most recently acquired by Success Education Colleges in 2008 for an undisclosed amount.

== Programs ==
Glendale Career College offers a variety of programs in the allied health fields.

== Accreditation ==
Glendale Career College is accredited with the following organizations:

- Accredited by the Accrediting Bureau of Health Education Schools (ABHES).
- Surgical Technology programs at Glendale Career College are accredited by the Commission on Accreditation of Allied Health Education Programs (CAAHEP).
- Vocational Nursing programs at Glendale Career College are approved by the Board of Vocational Nursing and Psychiatric Technicians (BVNPT).
