= Tom Robitaille =

American basketball player

Personal information
- Born: Graham, Texas
- Listed height: 6 ft 9 in (2.06 m)
- Listed weight: 200 lb (91 kg)

Career information
- College: Rice (1955–1959)
- NBA draft: 1959: 2nd round, 7th overall pick
- Drafted by: Detroit Pistons
- Position: Power forward / center

Career history
- 1959–1962: Phillips 66ers

Career highlights
- First-team All-SWC (1958); 2× Second-team All-SWC (1957, 1959)
- Stats at Basketball Reference

Tom Robitaille is an American former basketball player. He played collegiately for the Rice Owls from 1955 to 1959, where he led the team in scoring during his junior and senior seasons. He was considered the Owls' biggest asset during his senior season due to his great agility for his size. He was selected to the All-Southwest Conference (SWC) team three times: as the first-team in 1958 and the second-team in 1957 and 1959. In 1959, he was selected for the Billy Wohn Award, which is presented annually to the Owls basketball player who best exemplifies the qualities of "basketball ability, scholarship and leadership". Robitaille scored 1,137 points during his collegiate career, which ranks 27th best in program history.

Robitaille was selected in the 1959 NBA draft as the 7th overall pick by the Detroit Pistons as part of a trade deal with the Cincinnati Royals for Phil Jordon. Robitaille was "sought by at least six clubs" at the time of the draft but he ultimately never played in the National Basketball Association (NBA). In 1959, he played for the United States in a series of six exhibition games against a team from the Soviet Union. He played for the Phillips 66ers of the National Industrial Basketball League (NIBL) from 1959 to 1962.
