= Johnny Bianco =

American basketball player (1920–1977)

Personal information
- Born: February 20, 1920 New York City, New York, U.S.
- Died: January 14, 1977 (aged 56) Caldwell, Idaho, U.S.
- Listed height: 6 ft 4 in (1.93 m)
- Listed weight: 195 lb (88 kg)
- Position: Center

Career history

Playing
- 1946–1947: Toledo Jeeps
- 1947–1948: Portland Indians

Coaching
- 1947–1948: Portland Indians

Career highlights
- PCBL champion (1948)

John Joseph Bianco (February 20, 1920 – January 14, 1977) was an American professional basketball player. He played for the Toledo Jeeps in the National Basketball League during the 1946–47 season and averaged 1.0 point per game. He then played for the Portland Indians in the Pacific Coast Professional Basketball League in 1947–48, where he served as the team's player-coach and led them to the league championship.

Bianco also had a minor league baseball career. He played for the Amsterdam Rugmakers (1939), Binghamton Triplets (1940), Norfolk Tars (1941), Beaumont Exporters (1942, 1948), Kansas City Blues (1943), Portland Beavers (1947–1948).
