= Bill Bradley (basketball, born 1941) =

American basketball player

Personal information
- Born: June 16, 1941
- Died: June 5, 2002 (aged 60)
- Listed height: 5 ft 11 in (1.80 m)
- Listed weight: 165 lb (75 kg)

Career information
- High school: Central (Louisville, Kentucky)
- College: Tennessee State (1960–1964)
- NBA draft: 1964: undrafted
- Position: Shooting guard
- Number: 34

Career history
- 1967–1968: Kentucky Colonels

Career highlights
- AAU All-American (1964)
- Stats at Basketball Reference

William C. Bradley (June 16, 1941 – June 5, 2002) was an American basketball player. He attended Central High School in Louisville, Kentucky.

A 5-foot-11-inch (1.80 m) guard, he played for the Kentucky Colonels in the ABA for 58 games during the 1967–68 season.

== Career statistics ==
Legend
GP	Games played	GS	Games started	MPG	Minutes per game
FG%	Field goal percentage	3P%	3-point field goal percentage	FT%	Free throw percentage
RPG	Rebounds per game	APG	Assists per game	SPG	Steals per game
BPG	Blocks per game	PPG	Points per game	**Bold**	Career high

=== ABA ===
==== Regular season ====
Year	Team	GP	MPG	FG%	3P%	FT%	RPG	APG	PPG
1967–68	Kentucky	58	9.0	.318	.167	.911	.8	.9	3.8

==== Playoffs ====
Year	Team	GP	MPG	FG%	3P%	FT%	RPG	APG	PPG
1968	Kentucky	2	4.5	1.000	–	1.000	.5	.5	3.0
