= Gene Rhodes =

American basketball player and coach

Personal information
- Born: September 2, 1927 Louisville, Kentucky, U.S.
- Died: March 10, 2018 (aged 90) Louisville, Kentucky, U.S.
- Listed height: 6 ft 1 in (1.85 m)
- Listed weight: 170 lb (77 kg)

Career information
- High school: Louisville Male (Louisville, Kentucky)
- College: Western Kentucky (1948–1952)
- NBA draft: 1952: 5th round, 44th overall pick
- Drafted by: Indianapolis Olympians
- Playing career: 1952–1953
- Position: Point guard
- Number: 7

Career history

Playing
- 1952–1953: Indianapolis Olympians

Coaching
- 1967–1971: Kentucky Colonels

Career highlights
- ABA All-Star Game head coach (1969)

Career NBA statistics
- Points: 337
- Rebounds: 98
- Assists: 91
- Stats at NBA.com
- Stats at Basketball Reference

Eugene Stephen Rhodes (September 2, 1927 – March 10, 2018) was an American basketball player and coach.

== Career ==
Rhodes played college basketball at Western Kentucky University. While Rhodes was a player, WKU won the Ohio Valley Conference championship in 1949, 1950 and 1951, playing in the National Invitational Tournament in each of those seasons.

Rhodes played in the National Basketball Association (NBA)for the Indianapolis Olympians.

Rhodes was later head basketball coach at St. Xavier High School, leading that team to the 1958 Kentucky state championship.

In 1964, Rhodes later returned to WKU as an assistant coach under John Oldham, to 1968. In that time the team went to two NCAA tournaments and appeared once in the National Invitational Tournament.

During the inaugural season of the American Basketball Association the Kentucky Colonels started out with a record of 5–12, which led to the firing of head coach John Givens. Rhodes replaced Givens and guided the Colonels to fourth place in the Eastern Division. The Colonels lost the 1968 Eastern Division semifinals to the Minnesota Muskies 3 games to two.

In the 1968–69 season Rhodes led the Colonels to a record of 42-36 which was good for third place in the Eastern Division. Rhodes also coached the East team in the ABA All Star game. The Colonels made history this season as Penny Early became the first female player in the history of professional basketball. In the playoffs, the Colonels lost a close series, 4 games to 3, to the Indiana Pacers.

During the 1969–70 season the Colonels posted a record of 45 wins and 39 losses, claiming second place in the Eastern Division. The Colonels beat the New York Nets 4 games to 3 in the Eastern Division semifinals bust lost the Eastern Division finals to the Indiana Pacers, 4 games to 1.

Rhodes began the 1970–71 season with a 10–5 record with the Colonels but was fired at that point. Alex Groza was briefly the Colonels' head coach for two games (winning both) and Frank Ramsey assumed the reins for the remainder of the season as the Colonels defeated the Miami Floridians 4 games to 2 in the Eastern Division semifinals, defeated the Virginia Squires 4 games to 2 in the Eastern Division finals but then lost a very close ABA Championship series, 4 games to 3, to the Utah Stars.

In 1973, Rhodes became general manager of the Kentucky Colonels.

== Death ==
Rhodes died on March 10, 2018, aged 90 in his hometown in Louisville, Kentucky.

== Career statistics ==
Legend
GP	Games played	GS	Games started	MPG	Minutes per game
FG%	Field goal percentage	3P%	3-point field goal percentage	FT%	Free throw percentage
RPG	Rebounds per game	APG	Assists per game	SPG	Steals per game
BPG	Blocks per game	PPG	Points per game	**Bold**	Career high

=== NBA ===
==== Regular season ====
Year	Team	GP	MPG	FG%	FT%	RPG	APG	PPG
1952–53	Indianapolis	65	17.9	.319	.704	1.5	1.4	5.2

==== Playoffs ====
Year	Team	GP	MPG	FG%	FT%	RPG	APG	PPG
1953	Indianapolis	2	25.5	.286	.250	3.5	2.5	4.5

== Head coaching record ==
=== ABA ===
Legend
Regular season	G	Games coached	W	Games won	L	Games lost	W–L %	Win–loss %
Playoffs	PG	Playoff games	PW	Playoff wins	PL	Playoff losses	PW–L %	Playoff win–loss %

Team	Year	G	W	L	W–L%	Finish	PG	PW	PL	PW–L%	Result
Kentucky	1967–68	61	31	30	.508	4th in Eastern	5	2	3	.400	Lost in Division Semifinals
Kentucky	1968–69	78	42	36	.538	3rd in Eastern	7	3	4	.429	Lost in Division Semifinals
Kentucky	1969–70	84	45	39	.536	3rd in Eastern	12	5	7	.417	Lost in Division Finals
Kentucky	1970–71	15	10	5	.667	(fired)	—	—	—	—	—
Career		238	128	110	.538		24	10	14	.417	
