= Howard Bayne (basketball) =

American basketball player (1942–2018)

Personal information
- Born: July 28, 1942 Dayton, Ohio
- Died: May 14, 2018 (aged 75) Dayton, Ohio
- Listed height: 6 ft 6 in (1.98 m)
- Listed weight: 235 lb (107 kg)

Career information
- High school: Colonel White (Dayton, Ohio)
- College: Tennessee (1963–1966)
- NBA draft: 1966: 15th round, 107th overall pick
- Drafted by: Baltimore Bullets
- Playing career: 1966–1967
- Position: Power forward
- Number: 50

Career history
- 1967–1968: Kentucky Colonels
- Stats at Basketball Reference

Howard Edgar Bayne (July 28, 1942 – May 14, 2018) was an American basketball player.

== University of Tennessee ==
At 6 ft 6 in (1.98 m) and 230 pounds (104 kg), Bayne played as a power forward for the University of Tennessee under coach Ray Mears. He was nicknamed the "Chairman of the Boards" for his rebounding ability and was selected to the All-Southeastern Conference team during his college career.

In The Basketball Vols, Mears described Bayne as one of the most intimidating players on his teams.

== Professional basketball ==
He was selected by the Baltimore Bullets in the 15th round (107th pick overall) of the 1966 NBA draft.

He played for the Kentucky Colonels (1967–68) in the American Basketball Association for 69 games. As a Colonel, Bayne was known as an "enforcer skilled primarily at fouling the opposition".

== Career statistics ==
Legend
GP	Games played	GS	Games started	MPG	Minutes per game
FG%	Field goal percentage	3P%	3-point field goal percentage	FT%	Free throw percentage
RPG	Rebounds per game	APG	Assists per game	SPG	Steals per game
BPG	Blocks per game	PPG	Points per game	**Bold**	Career high

=== ABA ===
==== Regular season ====
Year	Team	GP	MPG	FG%	3P%	FT%	RPG	APG	PPG
1967–68	Kentucky	69	17.1	.360	.143	.538	6.6	1.0	4.9

==== Playoffs ====
Year	Team	GP	MPG	FG%	3P%	FT%	RPG	APG	PPG
1968	Kentucky	5	17.0	.158	.000	.545	4.6	1.0	2.4
