= Sam Smith (basketball, born 1943) =

American basketball player (1943–2022)

Personal information
- Born: January 27, 1943 Welch, West Virginia, U.S.
- Died: May 18, 2022 (aged 79) Indianapolis, Indiana, U.S.
- Listed height: 6 ft 7 in (2.01 m)
- Listed weight: 230 lb (104 kg)

Career information
- High school: Hazard (Hazard, Kentucky)
- College: Kentucky Wesleyan (1963–1967)
- NBA draft: 1967: 3rd round, 28th overall pick
- Drafted by: Cincinnati Royals
- Playing career: 1967–1971
- Position: Small forward
- Number: 52, 5, 50, 54

Career history
- 1967–1968: Minnesota Muskies
- 1968–1970: Kentucky Colonels
- 1971: Utah Stars

Career highlights
- ABA champion (1971)

Career statistics
- Points: 2,007 (8.2 ppg)
- Rebounds: 1,776 (7.0 rpg)
- Assists: 1,100 (1.1 apg)
- Stats at Basketball Reference

Samuel Chestley Smith Sr. (January 27, 1943 – May 18, 2022) was an American professional basketball player who played four seasons in the American Basketball Association (ABA). He played for the Minnesota Muskies, Kentucky Colonels, and Utah Stars from 1967 to 1971. Prior to turning professional, he was noted for being one of the first three African American basketball players at the University of Louisville. He later transferred to Kentucky Wesleyan College and helped the school win its first NCAA Division II championship in 1966.

== Early life ==
Smith was born in Welch, West Virginia, on January 27, 1943. He later relocated to Hazard, Kentucky, and attended Hazard High School, where he played American football and basketball. He was selected to the state's high school basketball All-Star team in 1962 to face the Indiana All-Stars. Later that year, he joined the University of Louisville after being recruited by Bernard Hickman, the Louisville Cardinals coach who also scouted Wade Houston and Eddie Whitehead. The trio became the first black basketball players at the University of Louisville, as well as the first at a traditionally white university in the state. Smith was the first of the three players to start for the Cardinals, as well as the most convincing candidate for playing time and chief rival of Judd Rothman, the Cardinals incumbent starting center.

== College career ==
During his sophomore year (his first on the varsity team), Smith averaged 9.2 points per game (PPG), and led the school in scoring. However, he was found to be academically ineligible for the team halfway through the season in February 1964. He consequently left Louisville, claiming that it was "too big for him", and transferred to Kentucky Wesleyan College. Together with Dallas Thornton and George Tinsley, he helped the Kentucky Wesleyan Panthers to the NCAA Division II championship in 1966, the first of eight titles for the school. In the final 15 seconds of the championship game, Smith made a layup to break a 51–51 tie and give the Panthers the victory over Southern Illinois University Carbondale. Smith, who scored more than 20 points in that game, was named the tournament's Most Outstanding Player.

Smith received two All-American selections during his college career and was honored as the All-NCAA South Region Most Outstanding Player twice. He was also named to the NCAA Championship All-Tournament Team in 1967. He finished with 1,102 career points and 714 rebounds. He was selected in the third round (28th overall selection) of the 1967 NBA draft by the Cincinnati Royals. He was ultimately signed by the Minnesota Muskies of the American Basketball Association (ABA) later that year.

== Professional career ==
Smith made his ABA debut with the Muskies on October 22, 1967, scoring 24 points to go along with 14 rebounds against the Kentucky Colonels. He played 77 games during his rookie season (18th most in the ABA), recording the eleventh-lowest turnover percentage (9.7) and fourth-most defensive win shares (5.2) that year. After one season with the franchise, he joined the Colonels in 1968. During the 1969–70 season, he finished fourteenth in the league in offensive rebounds (301), sixteenth in defensive win shares (3.3), nineteenth in total rebounds (719), and twentieth in rebounds per game (8.9). He was then traded to the Utah Stars late during the 1970–71 season. This consequently limited his playing time with the franchise, with Smith playing just one game in each of the Stars' three playoff series that year. The Stars ultimately won the championship in seven games against the Colonels. It turned out to be his final appearance in the ABA. Throughout his four-season ABA career, Smith averaged 8.2 PPG and 7.0 rebounds per game.

== Later life ==
After retiring from professional basketball, Smith went back to Owensboro, Kentucky. He carried on playing basketball on a leisurely basis, such as at the local Dust Bowl tournament. He also resided in Indianapolis. He was part of the inaugural class inducted into the Panthers Athletic Hall of Fame in 2013, alongside Thornton and Tinsley. He was also named to the Panthers All-Century team in voting by fans.

== Personal life ==
Smith was married to Helen Ruth Smith for 56 years until his death. Together, they had two children: Samuel Jr. and Felicia ("Nikki"), who predeceased him.

Smith died on May 18, 2022, at the age of 79, following the delay of his pension (which would have been distributed by the NBA). His funeral was held ten days later on May 28 at a Catholic church near Indianapolis.

== Career statistics ==
Legend
GP	Games played	GS	Games started	MPG	Minutes per game
FG%	Field goal percentage	3P%	3-point field goal percentage	FT%	Free throw percentage
RPG	Rebounds per game	APG	Assists per game	SPG	Steals per game
BPG	Blocks per game	PPG	Points per game	**Bold**	Career high

†	Denotes seasons in which Erving's team won an ABA championship

=== ABA ===
==== Regular season ====
Year	Team	GP	MPG	FG%	3P%	FT%	RPG	APG	PPG
1967–68	Minnesota	77	28.2	.379	**.333**	.661	7.6	1.1	**9.8**
1968–69	Kentucky	62	22.9	.396	.100	**.663**	6.3	1.0	7.4
1969–70	Kentucky	**81**	**29.7**	.424	.250	.655	**8.9**	**1.3**	9.6
1970–71	Kentucky	25	10.4	**.452**	.000	.629	2.7	.6	3.5
1970–71†	Utah	10	4.3	.300	**.333**	.500	1.3	.4	1.5
Career		255	24.7	.401	.200	.657	7.0	1.1	8.2

==== Playoffs ====
Year	Team	GP	MPG	FG%	3P%	FT%	RPG	APG	PPG
1968	Minnesota	10	**37.4**	.394	–	.686	**8.1**	1.2	**14.7**
1969	Kentucky	7	22.4	.333	.000	.438	6.0	**1.3**	6.4
1970	Kentucky	**12**	29.5	**.545**	–	**.737**	8.0	1.0	11.3
1971†	Utah	3	3.3	.333	.000	–	1.0	.3	1.3
Career		32	28.0	.431	.000	.667	6.9	1.1	10.4
