= Orbie Bowling =

American basketball player (born 1939)

Personal information
- Born: March 31, 1939 (age 87) Sandy Hook, Kentucky
- Listed height: 6 ft 10 in (2.08 m)
- Listed weight: 215 lb (98 kg)

Career information
- High school: Sandy Hook (Sandy Hook, Kentucky)
- College: Tennessee (1960–1963)
- NBA draft: 1963: 11th round, 76th overall pick
- Drafted by: New York Knicks
- Playing career: 1967–1968
- Position: Center
- Number: 52

Career history
- 1967–1968: Kentucky Colonels
- Stats at Basketball Reference

Orbie Lee "Orb" Bowling (born March 31, 1939) is a retired American basketball player. A native of Sandy Hook, Kentucky he was also known as "Chief." Bowling played collegiate basketball at the University of Tennessee.

== Professional career ==
In the 1963 NBA draft, Bowling was selected by the New York Knicks in the 11th round.

Following his NBA stint, Bowling joined the Washington Generals for the 1963-64 European tour.

Bowling joined the Kentucky Colonels in the inaugural 1967–68 season. He appeared in 11 games.
