= Gene Schwinger =

American basketball player (1932–2020)

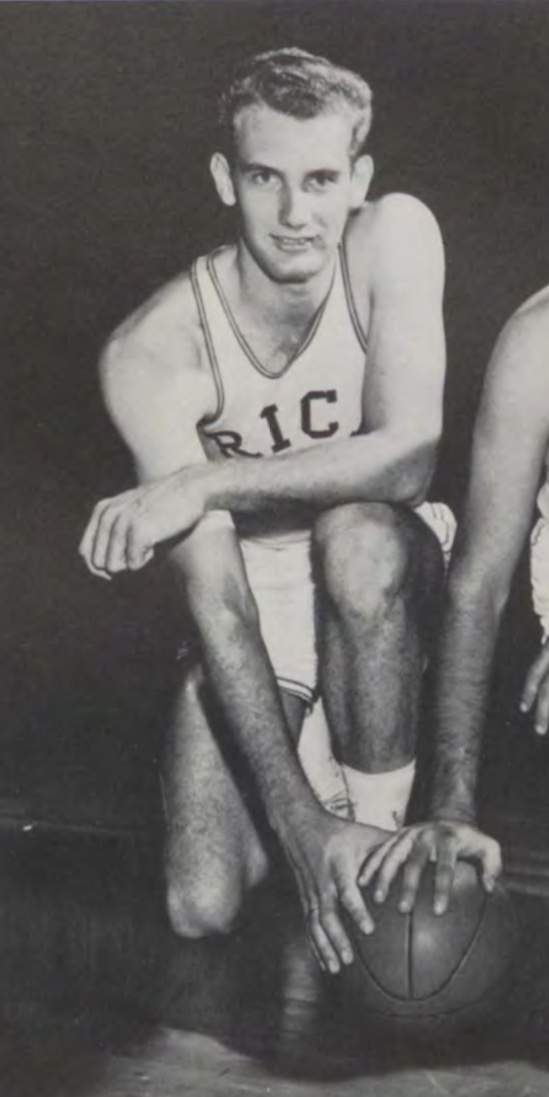
- Schwinger during his senior year at Rice.

Personal information
- Born: August 20, 1932 Houston, Texas, U.S.
- Died: January 16, 2020 (aged 87)
- Listed height: 6 ft 6 in (1.98 m)
- Listed weight: 215 lb (98 kg)

Career information
- High school: John H. Reagan (Houston, Texas)
- College: Rice (1951–1954)
- NBA draft: 1954: 4th round, 36th overall pick
- Drafted by: Minneapolis Lakers
- Position: Forward
- Number: 21

Career highlights
- Second-team All-American – NEA (1953); AP Honorable mention All-American (1954); 2× First-team All-SWC (1953, 1954); No. 21 retired by Rice Owls
- Stats at Basketball Reference

Eugene Albert Schwinger (August 20, 1932 – January 16, 2020) was an American basketball player, known for his All-American college career at Rice University in the 1950s.

A native of Houston, Texas, Schwinger committed to play for Rice on a full athletic scholarship in his junior year at John H. Reagan High School. He entered the school in the fall of 1950. Due to NCAA rules at the time, freshmen were ineligible to compete for varsity sports, so Schwinger's college basketball career began as a sophomore in 1951–52.

His three years as a Rice Owl proved to be one for the record books. At the time of his graduation, the 6'6" forward held four school records (all since eclipsed): points and rebounds in a single season (604 and 344), and points and rebounds for a career (1,328 and 810). He was twice a first-team All-Southwest Conference selection while leading the league in points per game both years. In all three seasons he led Rice in scoring and rebounding. As a junior in 1952–53 Schwinger was named a second-team All-American by the Newspaper Enterprise Association, and as a senior in 1953–54 the Associated Press named him an honorable mention All-American. In 1953–54 he led the Owls to a share of the Southwest Conference regular season title and a berth in the 1954 NCAA tournament, where the team finished in third place in their region.

In the spring of 1954 Schwinger was selected by the Minneapolis Lakers in the NBA draft. He was taken in the fourth round (36th overall). Schwinger opted instead to pursue a career in business, bypassing the NBA. He attended Harvard Business School and earned his Master of Business Administration (MBA) in 1959. Schwinger spent his business career in various roles within banking, securities trading, and investment firms until his retirement in 2003.
