= Wink Bowman =

American basketball player (1916–2001)

Personal information
- Born: January 22, 1916 Monticello, Indiana, U.S.
- Died: December 8, 2001 (aged 85) Remington, Indiana, U.S.

Career information
- High school: Remington (Remington, Indiana)
- College: Saint Joseph's (Indiana) (1939–1940)
- Position: Guard

Career history
- 1940: Hammond Ciesar All-Americans

Wendell Carleton "Wink" Bowman (January 22, 1916 – December 8, 2001) was an American professional basketball player. He played in the National Basketball League for the Hammond Ciesar All-Americans in 1940–41 and averaged 1.1 points per game.
