= Glendale Community College =

Glendale Community College may refer to one of two colleges in the United States:

- Glendale Community College (Arizona)
- Glendale Community College (California)
