= Tom Becker (basketball) =

American basketball player (1923–1991)

Personal information
- Born: May 17, 1923 Dover, Ohio
- Died: January 24, 1991 (aged 67) Dover, Ohio
- Listed height: 6 ft 1 in (1.85 m)
- Listed weight: 180 lb (82 kg)

Career information
- High school: Dover (Dover, Ohio)
- Position: Forward

Career history
- 1943–1944: Akron Shulans
- 1943–1944: Cleveland Summits
- 1944: Cleveland Allmen Transfers
- 1945–1946: Dover Gross Confectionary

Thomas W. Becker (May 17, 1923 – January 24, 1991) was an American professional basketball player. He played for the Cleveland Allmen Transfers in the National Basketball League for one game during the 1944–45 season.
