= Gene Moore (basketball) =

American basketball player (born 1945)

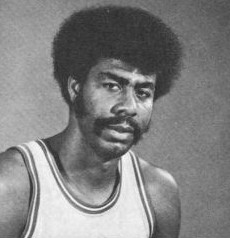
- Moore circa 1972

Personal information
- Born: July 29, 1945 (age 81) St. Louis, Missouri, U.S.
- Listed height: 6 ft 9 in (2.06 m)
- Listed weight: 225 lb (102 kg)

Career information
- High school: Sumner (St. Louis, Missouri)
- College: Saint Louis (1965–1968)
- NBA draft: 1968: 2nd round, 22nd overall pick
- Drafted by: Milwaukee Bucks
- Playing career: 1968–1975
- Position: Center
- Number: 54, 55, 10

Career history
- 1968–1970: Kentucky Colonels
- 1970–1971: Texas / Dallas Chaparrals
- 1971–1972: New York Nets
- 1972–1974: San Diego Conquistadors
- 1974–1975: Spirits of St. Louis
- 1977–1978: Tanduay Esquires

Career highlights
- ABA All-Star (1970); ABA All-Rookie Team (1969); First-team All-MVC (1966)

Career NBA and ABA statistics
- Points: 5,594 (12.0 ppg)
- Rebounds: 4,360 (9.4 rpg)
- Assists: 648 (1.4 apg)
- Stats at Basketball Reference

Eugene Wilbert Moore (born July 29, 1945) is an American former professional basketball player from St. Louis, Missouri. He played college basketball for the Saint Louis Billikens.

A 6'9" center from Saint Louis University, Moore was selected in the second round of the 1968 NBA draft by the Milwaukee Bucks and by the Kentucky Colonels in the American Basketball Association draft.

Moore played in the American Basketball Association (ABA) from 1968 through 1970 for the Kentucky Colonels, and spent the 1970–71 season with the Texas Chaparrals. After playing for the New York Nets during the 1971–72 season, Moore was selected by the expansion San Diego Conquistadors in the 1972 expansion draft and played two seasons with that team before finishing his ABA career with the Spirits of St. Louis during the 1974–75 season. Moore averaged 12.0 points per game and 9.4 rebounds per game in his ABA career and appeared in the 1970 ABA All-Star Game.

Moore holds the ABA records for the most personal fouls in a season (382 in 1969–70), the most personal fouls in an ABA career (1,348), and the most disqualifications in an ABA career (43).
