= Ollie Darden =

American basketball player (born 1944)

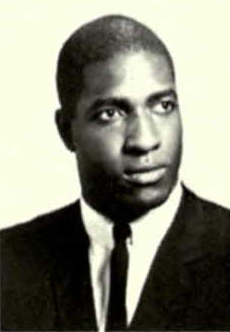
- Darden from the 1966 Michignensian

Personal information
- Born: July 28, 1944 (age 82) Aberdeen, Mississippi, U.S.
- Listed height: 6 ft 7 in (2.01 m)
- Listed weight: 235 lb (107 kg)

Career information
- High school: Western (Detroit, Michigan)
- College: Michigan (1963–1966)
- NBA draft: 1966: 3rd round, 22nd overall pick
- Drafted by: Detroit Pistons
- Playing career: 1966–1970
- Position: Power forward
- Number: 33, 9, 42

Career history
- 1967–1968: Indiana Pacers
- 1968–1969: New York Nets
- 1969–1970: Kentucky Colonels
- 1970: Indiana Pacers

Career highlights
- ABA champion (1970); AAU All-American (1966)
- Stats at Basketball Reference

Oliver M. Darden (born July 28, 1944, in Aberdeen, Mississippi) is an American former professional basketball player who played three seasons in the American Basketball Association (ABA).

A 6'7" power forward/center from the University of Michigan. Darden was initiated into Epsilon chapter of the Alpha Phi Alpha fraternity on campus. He was a 3-year starter along with Cazzie Russell, in what is claimed to be the "greatest basketball era at Michigan." They won or shared the Big Ten title each year. In the sophomore year, they advanced in the NCAA tournament, eventually losing to Duke in the Final Four. The junior year they lost the NCAA final game 91–80 to UCLA. The senior year, they advanced to the regional final, losing to Kentucky and Adolph Rupp, a season in which Oliver was team captain.

Darden played in the American Basketball Association from 1967 to 1970 as a member of the Indiana Pacers, New York Nets, and Kentucky Colonels. He was drafted in 1966 with the second pick in the third round (22nd overall) by the NBA's Detroit Pistons, but never played for them.
