= Darel Carrier =

American basketball player (born 1940)

Personal information
- Born: October 26, 1940 (age 86) Warren County, Kentucky, U.S.
- Listed height: 6 ft 3 in (1.91 m)
- Listed weight: 185 lb (84 kg)

Career information
- High school: Bristow (Bristow, Kentucky)
- College: Western Kentucky (1961–1964)
- NBA draft: 1964: 9th round, 74th overall pick
- Drafted by: St. Louis Hawks
- Playing career: 1967–1973
- Position: Shooting guard
- Number: 35

Career history
- 1967–1972: Kentucky Colonels
- 1972–1973: Memphis Tams

Career highlights
- 3× ABA All-Star (1968–1970); ABA All-Time Team; 3× First-team All-OVC (1962–1964); No. 35 jersey retired by Western Kentucky Hilltoppers
- Stats at Basketball Reference
Medals
Representing United States
Men's basketball
Pan American Games
Gold medal – first place	1967 Winnipeg	Team Competition

James Darel Carrier (born October 26, 1940) is a former professional basketball player. Born in Warren County, Kentucky, Carrier played his high school basketball at Bristow High School (now operates as Bristow Elementary due to consolidation). A 6'3" guard, Carrier played college basketball at Western Kentucky University under coach E.A. Diddle. Carrier was selected in the 9th round of the 1964 NBA draft by the St. Louis Hawks. However, Carrier originally played AAU basketball for the Phillips 66ers and later signed with and played for the Kentucky Colonels of the rival American Basketball Association (ABA).

Carrier was a three-time ABA All-Star with the Colonels (1968, 1969, 1970), teaming with Louie Dampier to form the most explosive backcourt in the ABA; in each of the league's first three seasons, both averaged at least 20 points per game. Carrier played for the Memphis Tams during the 1972–73 season and then retired from pro basketball with 7,011 career points.

He is a member of the ABA All-Time Team and had the highest career 3 point shooting percentage in ABA history.

Carrier and his wife, Donna, a retired schoolteacher live on a farm just west of Oakland, Kentucky. They have two sons, Jonathan and Josh. The Carrier's youngest son, Josh, played basketball for the University of Kentucky for Tubby Smith. Like his father, he was also a guard.

He played for the United States men's national basketball team at the 1967 FIBA World Championship.
