= Bobby Rascoe =

American basketball player (1940–2024)

Personal information
- Born: July 22, 1940 Trigg County, Kentucky, U.S.
- Died: August 24, 2024 (aged 84) Bowling Green, Kentucky, U.S.
- Listed height: 6 ft 4 in (1.93 m)
- Listed weight: 205 lb (93 kg)

Career information
- High school: Daviess County (Owensboro, Kentucky)
- College: Western Kentucky (1959–1962)
- NBA draft: 1962: 3rd round, 20th overall pick
- Drafted by: New York Knicks
- Playing career: 1962–1969
- Position: Small forward / shooting guard
- Number: 34, 25, 45

Career history
- 1962–1967: Phillips 66ers
- 1967–1969: Kentucky Colonels

Career highlights
- AAU All-American (1966); AAU champion (1963); 2× First-team All-OVC (1961, 1962); Second-team All-OVC (1960); No. 45 jersey retired by Western Kentucky Hilltoppers
- Stats at Basketball Reference

Robert Byron Rascoe (July 22, 1940 – August 24, 2024) was an American basketball player. He played in the American Basketball Association (ABA) with the Kentucky Colonels.

On December 29, 2012, Western Kentucky University honored Rascoe's accomplishments by retiring his jersey in the rafters of EA Diddle Arena.

Rascoe died in Bowling Green, Kentucky, on August 24, 2024, at the age of 84.
