= Kentucky Colonels =

American basketball team (1967–1976)

- Conference: None
- Division: Eastern Division (No division during 1975–76)
- Founded: 1967
- Folded: 1976
- History: Kentucky Colonels; 1967–1976
- Arena: Louisville Convention Center (1967–1970); Freedom Hall (1970–1976)
- Location: Louisville, Kentucky
- Team colors: Chartreuse and white (1967–1970) Blue and white (1970–1974) Blue, red, and white (1974–1976)
- Head coach: (1967) John Givens (1967–1970) Gene Rhodes (1970) Alex Groza (1970–1971) Frank Ramsey (1971–1973) Joe Mullaney (1973–1974) Babe McCarthy (1974–1976) Hubie Brown
- Ownership: Don Regan (1967); Joseph E. Gregory, Mamie Gregory, and William C. Boone (1967–1969); H. Wendell Cherry, Bill DeWitt, Stuart Jay, David Jones, John Y. Brown, Jr., and Mike Storen (1969–1973); John Y. Brown, Jr. and Ellie Brown (1973–1976)
- Championships: 1 (1975)
- Division titles: 2 (1972, 1975)

The Kentucky Colonels were an American professional basketball team based in Louisville, Kentucky. They competed in the American Basketball Association (ABA) from 1967 to 1976. The name is derived from the historic Kentucky Colonel. The Colonels won the most games and had the highest winning percentage of any franchise in the league's history. However, the team did not join the National Basketball Association (NBA) in the 1976 ABA–NBA merger. The downtown Louisville Convention Center (now known as The Gardens) was the Colonels' venue for their first three seasons before moving to Freedom Hall for the remaining seasons, beginning with the 1970–71 schedule.

The Kentucky Colonels and the Indiana Pacers were the only ABA teams to play for the entire duration of the league without moving, changing team names, or folding. The Colonels were also the only major league franchise in Kentucky since the Louisville Breckenridges left the National Football League in 1923.

== Overview and background ==
The Louisville-based Colonels started their time in the ABA. They were known for their "mascot" Ziggy, a prize-winning Brussels Griffon dog that was owned by original team owners Joe and Mamie Gregory, daughter of former U.S. Senator Robert R. Reynolds

They were equally famous for publicity stunts. In 1968, the team signed Penny Ann Early, the first licensed female horse racing jockey. In a game on November 27, 1968, Early inbounded the ball to Bobby Rascoe, making her the only woman to ever play in the ABA or NBA. A timeout was immediately called, and she was taken out of the game.

The team's biggest rival was the Indiana Pacers, reflecting their states' prominent college basketball programs. The two teams played in the same Eastern Division for the first three seasons before Indiana was reassigned to the Western. It was referred to in some circles as the "I-65 Series", referring to the Interstate that connected the two states; the two met five times in the playoffs, with each being the most common opponent played in the postseason.

In 1970, the team was sold to a group led by Wendell Cherry and future Governor of Kentucky John Y. Brown Jr., who appointed Mike Storen as general manager. Storen fired Gene Rhodes, who had worked as the head coach since the early games of the 1967–68 season, saying Rhodes "is not in the best long-term interest of the team". In that year, the team signed another Wildcat star in All-American Dan Issel. They also dropped the chartreuse uniforms in favor of a blue and white scheme similar to that of the Wildcats. Another abnormality to the Colonels uniform change was that the players' last names on the back had only the first letter capitalized, as opposed to all capital letters, which are almost universally featured on the back of nearly every professional or collegiate basketball uniform where names are featured on the back. Issel's signing helped the Colonels become well known as a legitimate basketball team. Despite an average record in the regular season, they made a serious run at the 1971 ABA championship. They fell just short, however, and lost to the Utah Stars in seven games.

They proved to be even better in 1971, with the signing of Artis Gilmore with a ten-year deal of $1.5 million that saw him receive $150,000 a year for ten years with a $50,000 bonus and a Dolgoff Plan that would pay him $40,000 a year for 20 years starting in 1981. Gilmore's signing would help make the Colonels a legitimate powerhouse for years to come. The Colonels won 68 games in his rookie campaign under coach Joe Mullaney; their record turned out to be best in the league's entire history. Yet, in the playoffs, they were upset by the New York Nets in the first round. Kentucky recovered and made another championship run during the 1972–73 playoffs and faced the Indiana Pacers in the third rendition of the "I-65 Series". In a physical series that went the maximum seven games, the Pacers defeated the Colonels in Kentucky to win the championship.

After the season, the franchise was nearly moved out-of-state to Cincinnati when a group headed by Bill DeWitt bought it. However, spurred by his family (most notably John Y. Brown III), Brown Jr., who owned Kentucky Fried Chicken for years, swooped in to buy the team and have it stay in Kentucky. He also stated that his wife Ellie was distinctly a co-owner with him. In fact, several women would be hired to serve on the board for the team, which helped significantly with tickets. Brown helped increase interest in the team, and looked to improve its on-court performance by hiring popular ABA coach Babe McCarthy. But after they were swept in the second round of the playoffs by the Nets, Brown gave McCarthy his walking papers.

For the 1974–75 season, Brown hired Hubie Brown (no relation), a former NBA assistant coach, to give them that championship. Unlike the previous year, the Colonels would not be denied. After a torrid finish to the regular season, which saw them win 23 of 26 games, they ripped through the playoffs, and beat their nemesis, the Indiana Pacers, in a dominant 4 games to 1 victory to win the 1975 ABA championship. Gilmore scored 28 points and grabbed an amazing 31 rebounds in the final game. That same season the Golden State Warriors won the NBA championship. Brown Jr. offered the NBA champs a million dollars to play a one-game world championship. The Warriors and the NBA refused.

The celebration of the 1975 season ended when Brown Jr. dealt Issel to the ABA's new Baltimore Claws franchise (which folded after a few preseason exhibition games, never taking the floor in the regular season) for financial reasons. They acquired all-star Caldwell Jones to replace him, but he never gelled with the team. Jones was dealt mid-season for young Maurice Lucas. On the eve of the postseason, Ellie Brown announced on April 6, 1975, that the team would be sold for $1.5 million to a local syndicate headed by J. Bruce Miller, a Louisville attorney, provided that he would raise $500,000 by June 15 and also assume a five-year debt of $1 million. The Browns were reported to have lost $500,000 in operating the team in the championship 1974–75 season. The Colonels won the first round series against Indiana and reached the league semifinal against the regular season leader Denver Nuggets, even forcing a Game 7 after winning Game 6 in double-overtime. Denver won Game 7 in what ended up being the last game of the franchise.

Kentucky was one of the league's strongest teams, both on and off the court. It boasted a talented roster and had one of its best fan bases. However, during merger talks with the NBA, the older league's Chicago Bulls objected to the Colonels being part of the merger. They owned the NBA rights to Artis Gilmore, and desperately wanted him on their roster, even at the expense of accepting the geographically much closer Pacers in their place. As a result, Brown Jr. was forced to fold the Colonels. Brown would indeed get an NBA franchise: he purchased the Buffalo Braves in 1976, then traded it for the Boston Celtics two years later.

Colonels players were distributed to other teams in a dispersal draft, with Gilmore going to Chicago. Maurice Lucas went on to be an all-star for the Portland Trail Blazers and Louie Dampier, who ended up being the all-time leader in points and assists, ended his career as a sixth man for the San Antonio Spurs. Coach Hubie Brown went on to coach the Atlanta Hawks for five seasons after the merger before being fired.

The Colonels won 448 games in the ABA, more than any other team or franchise. The Colonels' overall regular season record was 448–296; their .602 winning percentage is better than that of any ABA franchise except for the Minnesota Muskies, who only played one season. (If the Utah Stars' statistics are counted on their own, excluding their seasons as the Anaheim Amigos and the Los Angeles Stars, that team's winning percentage, .608, is slightly better than the Colonels'. The Colonels' winning percentage during the Utah Stars ABA existence was 65%.)

The Colonels' playoff record was 55–46 (.545). Only the Indiana Pacers won more ABA playoff games (69).

== Year-by-year results ==
=== 1967–1968 ===
On March 6, 1967, the American Basketball Association awarded the franchise that became the Kentucky Colonels to Don Regan for $30,000. Later that year the franchise was bought by Joseph Gregory, Mamie Gregory and William C. Boone.

John Givens was named as the first coach of the Colonels.

The Colonels draft picks were used on UK standout Louie Dampier, who signed with the Colonels; Western Kentucky University standout Clem Haskins, who signed with the NBA's Chicago Bulls; Bob Verga, who signed with Dallas, and Randy Mahaffey, who signed with the Colonels. The team also signed Darel Carrier (WKU) and Jim "Goose" Ligon (from Kokomo, Indiana). The Colonels' 1967–68 roster was rounded out with Kendall Rhine (Rice University), Stew Johnson (Murray State), Rubin Russell, Bill Bradley (Tennessee Tech), Cotton Nash (UK), Bobby Rascoe (WKU), Howard Bayne (Tennessee), Orbie Bowling (Tennessee) and Tommy Woods.

The Colonels played their home games at the Kentucky Fair and Exposition Center (Freedom Hall) and at the Louisville Convention Center (now Louisville Gardens). The team only won 5 of their first 17 games, leading to Givens being fired as coach. He was replaced by Gene Rhodes. In November, Stew Johnson was traded to the New Jersey Americans for Jim Caldwell. Darel Carrier, Randy Mahaffey and Louie Dampier played in the ABA All Star game but the team finished with a record of 36 wins and 42 losses, tying New Jersey for fourth place in the Eastern Division. For the season the Colonels averaged 3,225 fans per game.

The Colonels and Americans scheduled a one-game playoff game to determine who would get the playoff bid slated for the Eastern Division's fourth place team. The game was scheduled at the Long Island Arena, as New Jersey's Teaneck Armory was unavailable, but the facility was in such poor condition that the game could not be played, and the Colonels won by forfeit. The Colonels then advanced to the Eastern Division semifinals where they lost to the Minnesota Muskies 3 games to 2.

=== 1968–1969 ===
Among the Colonels' draft picks was University of Louisville star Wes Unseld, who opted to take a higher paying deal with the NBA's Baltimore franchise. The Colonels also drafted Manny Leaks and Gene Moore, who signed with the team. Sam Smith was acquired from Minnesota and then Randy Mahaffey and Manny Leaks were traded to the New York Nets for Oliver Darden and Andy Anderson.

The Colonels hosted the 1969 ABA All-Star Game in Louisville. Kentucky coach Gene Rhodes was the head coach for the East team, which lost to the West 133–127. Darel Carrier and Louie Dampier repeated as ABA All Stars and were joined by Kentucky's Jim "Goose" Ligon.

During this season the Colonels fielded the first ever female professional basketball player when jockey Penny Ann Early joined the team for pregame warmups and appeared briefly during a game.

The Colonels finished in third place in the Eastern Division with a 42–36 record. Their average home attendance was 4,157.

In the Eastern Division semifinals the Colonels lost a tight series to their rival the Indiana Pacers, 4 games to 3.

=== 1969–1970 ===
The Colonels used their draft picks to select Bob Dandridge, who joined the Milwaukee Bucks of the NBA and Herm Gilliam, who signed with the NBA's Cincinnati franchise. Bud Olsen, former Kentucky Wesleyan College star George Tinsley, future Kentucky Wesleyan coach Wayne Chapman and former University of Kentucky star Tommy Kron were added to the roster.

In April 1969 the Colonels were bought by a group of Louisville investors that included H. Wendell Cherry, Bill DeWitt, J. David Grissom, Stuart P. Jay, David A. Jones, John Y. Brown, Jr. and Mike Storen. Storen had previously been the president and general manager of the Indiana Pacers. The group then hired former University of Kentucky star Alex Groza as the team's business manager.

Darel Carrier and Louie Dampier again appeared in the ABA All Star Game and were joined by Gene Moore.

The Colonels finished the season with a record of 45–39 which was good for second place in the Eastern Division.

The Colonels defeated the New York Nets 4 games to 3 in the Eastern Division semifinals but lost in the Eastern Division finals to the Indiana Pacers, 4 games to 1.

=== 1970–1971 ===
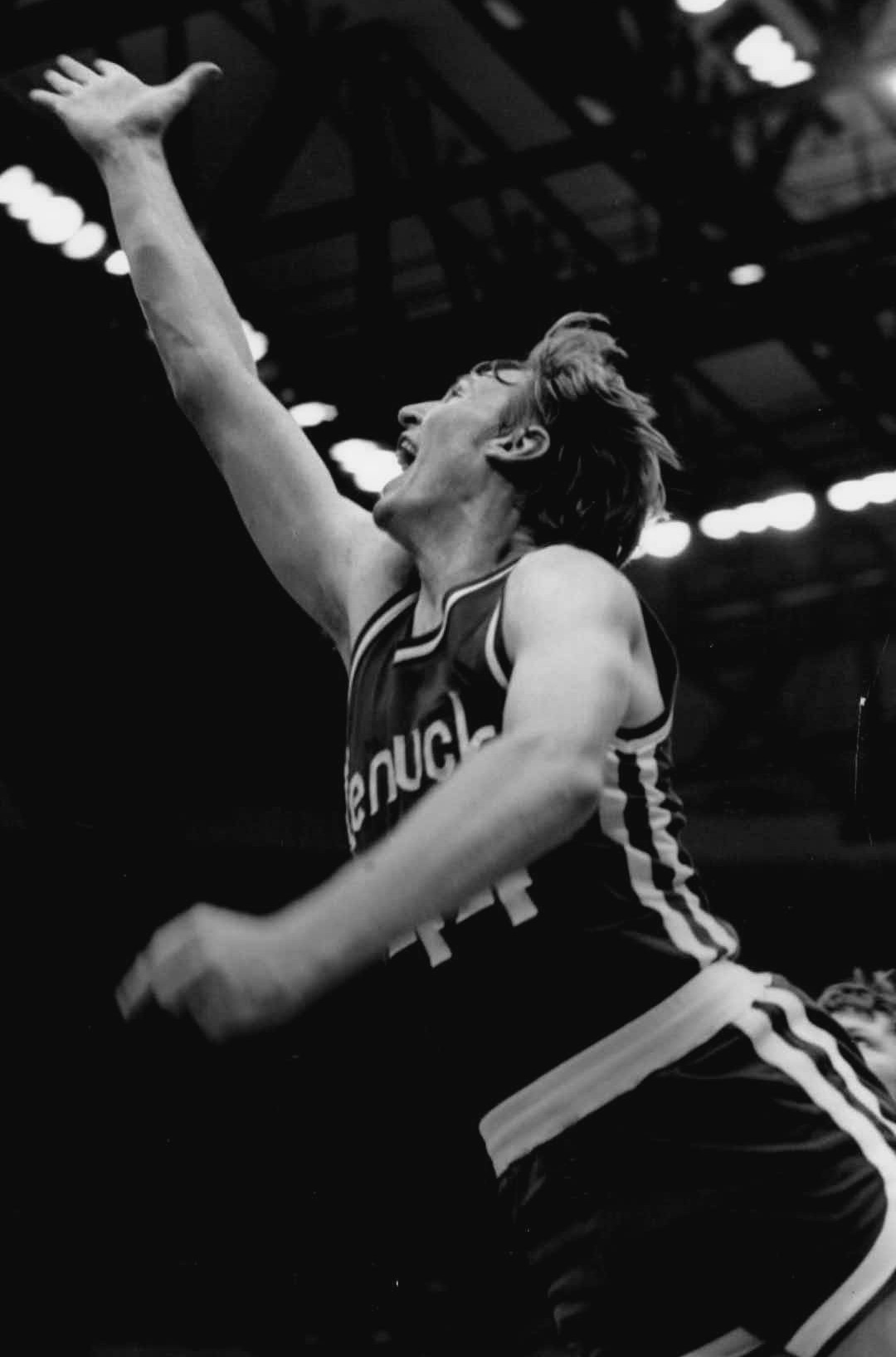
In his rookie season, Dan Issel led the ABA in scoring with 29.9 points per game, and also averaged 13.2 rebounds per game.

In July the Colonels traded Jim "Goose" Ligon, Gene Moore and Bud Olsen to Dallas for Cincy Powell. They also signed University of Kentucky star Dan Issel. Issel was given a 10-year contract worth $1.4 million. The Colonels also traded a draft pick to the New York Nets for Walt Simon. Mike Pratt joined the Colonels' roster for the season.

The Colonels began the regular season with a 10–5 record, resulting in coach Gene Rhodes being fired. Rhodes was briefly replaced by Alex Groza, who won both games he coached. Groza was quickly replaced as coach by Frank Ramsey, the former star for the University of Kentucky and the Boston Celtics.

Kentucky's Dan Issel and Cincy Powell played in the ABA All-Star Game. Issel was named Co-Rookie of the Year, along with Charlie Scott of the Virginia Squires.

The Colonels finished the regular season with a record of 44–40 and in second place in the Eastern Division. Their average home attendance for the season was 7,375. Beginning with this season the Colonels moved their home games from the Louisville Convention Center (now Louisville Gardens) to Freedom Hall.

The Colonels defeated The Floridians 4 games to 2 in the Eastern Division semifinals and defeated the Virginia Squires 4 games to 2 in the Eastern Division finals. Facing the Utah Stars in the ABA championship, the Colonels and Stars each won three games before Utah pulled out Game 7 at home in front of an ABA record crowd. The Colonels finished as the league's runner up.

=== 1971–1972 ===
The Colonels' draft picks included Artis Gilmore, John Roche and Mike Gale, who all signed with Kentucky, and Fred Brown and Larry Steele, who signed with the Seattle SuperSonics and Portland Trail Blazers of the NBA, respectively. The Colonels then sold Roche to the New York Nets. Gilmore, like Issel, signed a contract for 10 years and $1.5 million. Joe Mullaney was named coach of the Colonels.

On September 22, 1971, the Colonels played in the second ever ABA vs. NBA preseason exhibition game. 13,821 fans watched the Colonels defeat the Baltimore Bullets 111–85 in Freedom Hall. It was the ABA's first win against the NBA, as the ABA's Dallas Chaparrals had lost to the NBA's Milwaukee Bucks 106–103 the night before in the first ever matchup between the two leagues.

On October 8, 1971, the Colonels hosted the Milwaukee Bucks and Kareem Abdul-Jabbar at Freedom Hall in front of over 18,000 fans. Dan Issel scored 34 points and Artis Gilmore posted 18 points, 16 rebounds and 5 blocked shots. However, Abdul-Jabbar had 30 points, 20 rebounds and 3 blocked shots and the Bucks edged the Colonels, 99–93. The very next night the Colonels hosted the New York Knicks in Freedom Hall. The Knicks won, 112–100, before 12,238 fans.

The Colonels had a terrific regular season. Mullaney coached in the ABA All Star Game, heading up the East team which won 142–115. Dan Issel, Louie Dampier and Artis Gilmore each played in the All Star Game for the East team; Issel was the game's Most Valuable Player. Gilmore ended up as the league's Most Valuable Player at the end of the season and was also the league's Rookie of the Year. Gilmore's impressive statistics included leading the league with 3,666 minutes in play, a field goal percentage of 59.8% and an average of 17.8 rebounds per game. Gilmore and Issel were both on the All-ABA First Team.

Kentucky finished the season with the best record ever posted in ABA play, with 68 wins and 16 losses, a winning percentage of .810. This secured the Colonels' first ever first-place finish in the Eastern Division. The Colonels' average home attendance was 8,811.

Kentucky's season came to an end when the Colonels lost in the Eastern Division semifinals to the New York Nets, 4 games to 2.

=== 1972–1973 ===
Prior to the season the Colonels traded Cincy Powell to the Utah Stars for a draft pick and cash, and bought Rick Mount from the Indiana Pacers for $250,000. Wendell Ladner joined the Colonels' roster for the season.

In preseason play, on September 23, 1972, the Colonels hosted the NBA's Atlanta Hawks for an exhibition game in Frankfort. Julius Erving played for the Hawks, posting 28 points and 18 rebounds in 42 minutes. The Hawks prevailed, 112–99. On September 30, 1972, the Colonels traveled to Phoenix, Arizona for an exhibition game against the Phoenix Suns. The Colonels won, 120–118. On October 1, 1972, the Milwaukee Bucks returned to Freedom Hall. Oscar Robertson and Kareem Abdul-Jabbar each scored 20 points as the Bucks beat the Colonels 131–100. On October 6, 1972, the Phoenix Suns played the Colonels at Freedom Hall. The Suns won, 103–91. The next night the Colonels lost a close game to the Baltimore Bullets, 95–93.

Louie Dampier, Dan Issel and Artis Gilmore returned to the ABA All-Star Game. Gilmore was again First Team All-ABA and posted a 55.9% field goal percentage and averaged 17.6 rebounds per game. Issel led the league in minutes played with 3,531.

The Colonels finished in second place in the Eastern Division with a record of 56 wins and 28 losses. Their average home attendance was 7,113.

The Colonels beat the Virginia Squires 4 games to 1 in the Eastern Division Semifinals and beat the Carolina Cougars 4 games to 3 in the Eastern Division finals. The Colonels then lost a very close ABA Championship Series to the Indiana Pacers, 4 games to 3.

=== 1973–1974 ===
Prior to the Colonels' 1973–74 season the Colonels drafted M. L. Carr and Ron Behagen; Carr stayed in college and Behagen signed with the NBA's Kansas City-Omaha Kings. The Colonels also selected Ernie DiGregorio in a special circumstance draft but he signed with the NBA's Buffalo Braves.

In July 1973 the franchise was bought by a group headed by John Y. Brown, Jr. and his wife Ellie Brown. Ellie Brown was later named Chairman of the Board of the team; the board itself was made up of ten women. Legendary former University of Kentucky head coach Adolph Rupp was named as Vice President of the Board. Mike Storen left the team; he later surfaced with the ABA's Memphis franchise. Former head coach Gene Rhodes became general manager of the team.

Head coach Joe Mullaney departed to become head coach of the Utah Stars. Mullaney was succeeded by Babe McCarthy.

In preseason play against the NBA the Colonels defeated the Houston Rockets 110–102 at Freedom Hall on September 21, 1973, and defeated the Kansas City-Omaha Kings 110–99 the following night.

In January 1974 the Colonels traded Jim O'Brien and a first round draft pick to the San Diego Conquistadors for Red Robbins and Chuck Williams. That same month Kentucky dealt Rick Mount to the Utah Stars for a draft pick and cash, and then sent Mike Gale and Wendell Ladner to the New York Nets for former Colonel John Roche.

Louie Dampier, Dan Issel and Artis Gilmore again played in the ABA All-Star Game, and Babe McCarthy coached the East team. Gilmore was again named the game's Most Valuable Player. Gilmore again posted remarkable statistics including 3,502 minutes played (tops in the league) and 18.3 rebounds per game (Gilmore grabbed 40 rebounds in one game against the New York Nets that season). Louie Dampier posted a league high 38.7% percentage in three-point shots. Babe McCarthy and his Colonels predecessor Joe Mullaney were named ABA Co-Coaches of the Year.

The Colonels posted a regular season record of 53 wins and 31 losses, clinching second place in the Eastern Division. Kentucky's average home attendance for the season was 8,201.

In the playoffs Kentucky defeated the Carolina Cougars 4 games to none in the Eastern Division semifinals but then lost the Eastern Division finals to the New York Nets 4 games to none. Despite being named ABA Coach of the Year, Babe McCarthy was fired at the end of the season.

=== 1974–1975 ===
The Colonels took Jim Price, Greg Smith, Rowland Garrett, Herm Gilliam and Larry Steele in a draft of NBA players, bought Ted McClain from the Carolina Cougars, signed Wil Jones, and traded a draft pick and cash to the San Antonio Spurs for Bird Averitt. The Colonels also sent Al Eberhard to the Denver Nuggets in exchange for Marv Roberts and sent Red Robbins to the Virginia Squires for cash. John Roche was sold to the Utah Stars in the midst of the season. Gene Littles was added to the Colonels roster for the season.

Hubie Brown was named the new head coach of the Colonels.

In preseason play against the NBA the Colonels lost a game in Lincoln, Nebraska to the Kansas City-Omaha Kings 102–91 on September 29, 1974; beat the Washington Bullets 118–95 at Freedom Hall on October 1, 1974; lost by one point on the road to the Houston Rockets on October 5, 1974, 96–95; beat the Detroit Pistons 109–100 at Freedom Hall on October 8, 1974, and on October 12, 1974, defeated the Chicago Bulls at Freedom Hall 93–75.

Louie Dampier, Dan Issel and Artis Gilmore again played in the ABA All Star Game. Gilmore again was First Team All ABA and led the league with 3,493 minutes played.

The Colonels claimed first place in the Eastern Division with a record of 58 wins and 26 losses, but tied with the New York Nets for the division crown. The Colonels' average home attendance was 8,727.

The Colonels began the playoffs with a one-game matchup against the New York Nets to determine who would be first place in the Eastern Division. The Colonels won that game in Louisville 108–99. The Colonels then defeated the Memphis Sounds 4 games to 1 in the Eastern Division semifinals and defeated the Spirits of St. Louis 4 games to 1 in the Eastern Division finals. The Colonels met their rivals the Indiana Pacers for the ABA Championship and the Colonels prevailed, 4 games to 1, winning their first ABA Championship.

Colonels owner John Y. Brown offered $1 million to the NBA Champion Golden State Warriors to play a world title game, following the tradition of previous ABA champions that had offered to play the NBA champion. The NBA and Golden State refused. Hubie Brown went on to coach many teams in the NBA but has always maintained (including in his Naismith Basketball Hall of Fame induction) that the 1974–75 Colonels were the best team he coached.

=== 1975–1976 ===
Prior to the season the Colonels and the ABA's commissioner, Dave DeBusschere, challenged the NBA to have its champion, the Golden State Warriors, face the Colonels in a championship series, the winner of which would get $1 million. The NBA declined. Interest in ABA vs. NBA play extended beyond the two leagues' management. In 1976, CBS sought to establish a postseason playoff between the ABA and NBA, and to win the rights to broadcast those games.

To the dismay of Colonels fans and players, owner John Y. Brown, Jr. dealt star Dan Issel to the Baltimore Claws prior to the season for $500,000; the cash was not forthcoming from the struggling Baltimore franchise and Issel ended up with the Denver Nuggets shortly before the Claws were shut down by the league.

Gene Rhodes was named vice president of operations and David Vance was named general manager for the team.

In preseason play the Colonels defeated the Chicago Bulls, 95–86, at Riverfront Coliseum in Cincinnati on October 1, 1975; lost to the New York Knicks in Landover, Maryland at the Capital Centre, 107–102, on October 4, 1975; defeated the Detroit Pistons 114–113 on October 5, 1975, in Cincinnati; defeated the Milwaukee Bucks 96–91 in Freedom Hall on October 10, 1975; lost an overtime game to the Detroit Pistons in Detroit on October 12, 1975, 115–107; defeated the Buffalo Braves, 120–116, in Freedom Hall on October 14, 1975; defeated the Philadelphia 76ers 112–110 in Cincinnati, Ohio on October 17, 1975; and won another ABA vs. NBA exhibition on October 19, 1975, with a 121–111 victory over the Washington Bullets in Lexington, Kentucky. The game against the Bullets was the penultimate ABA vs. NBA contest; two nights later in the final ABA vs. NBA matchup the Utah Stars defeated the Milwaukee Bucks, 106–101.

The prior year, the NBA declined the ABA champion Colonels' challenge against the NBA champion Golden State Warriors for a $1 million payout. However, the two teams met on October 8, 1975, at Freedom Hall. The Colonels won the matchup of the league champions, 93–90.

The Colonels finished the 1975–76 preseason with a record of 7–2 against NBA teams. The Colonels, like the ABA as a whole, had a winning overall record against the NBA over the course of their existence.

Shortly after the regular season began the San Diego Sails folded and the Colonels picked up Caldwell Jones from their roster. Kentucky then traded Jones to the Spirits of St. Louis for Maurice Lucas. The Colonels also traded Marv Roberts to the Virginia Squires during the season in exchange for Johnny Neumann and Jan van Breda Kolff. Another move in the middle of the season sent Ted McClain to the New York Nets in exchange for $150,000. Allen Murphy, Jimmy Dan Connor, Johnny Neumann, Jimmy Baker, Kevin Joyce and Jim McDaniels joined the Colonels' roster for the 1975–76 season.

Artis Gilmore returned to the ABA All-Star Game and once again was named First Team All ABA. Dampier, after seven appearances in that game, was not chosen.

The Colonels finished in fourth place in the regular season with a record of 46–38. Their average home attendance was 6,935.

The Colonels defeated their rivals, the Indiana Pacers, 2 games to 1 in the first round of the playoffs. In the league semifinals, the Colonels and the Denver Nuggets each won three games apiece before Denver claimed Game 7 133–110 at Denver on April 28, 1976. It was the Kentucky Colonels' final game.

=== Aftermath ===
The ABA had entered the 1975–1976 preseason with ten teams. After three preseason games, the Baltimore Claws were shut down by the league due to financial problems and unpaid bills. The San Diego Sails and the Utah Stars each folded shortly after the season began, the Sails after 11 games and the Stars after 16. The ABA was reduced to seven teams for the remainder of the season. Shortly after the regular season ended, the Virginia Squires were forced to fold because they could not meet a league-mandated financial assessment. The six remaining ABA teams began negotiations for the eventual ABA–NBA merger. According to Jim Bukata of the ABA, the NBA opposed Kentucky joining the league, and Bill Wirtz of the Chicago Bulls opposed Kentucky joining because Chicago wanted to acquire Kentucky's Artis Gilmore in a dispersal draft. In the end, the Colonels were not among the four teams the NBA agreed to take in.

On July 17, 1976, the Kentucky Colonels ceased to exist as John Y. Brown, Jr. agreed to fold the Colonels in exchange for $3 million. Brown used the money to purchase the Buffalo Braves of the NBA. Brown's intent was to use the purchase as a backdoor to revive the Colonels by relocating the Braves to Louisville. Unable to find a willing co-owner for the venture, Brown engineered a franchise swap to buy the Boston Celtics (which he sold off in 1979) while the Braves franchise eventually became the Los Angeles Clippers.

The Colonels players were put into a dispersal draft. The Chicago Bulls took Artis Gilmore for $1.1 million as they had wished. The Portland Trail Blazers took Maurice Lucas for $300,000. The Buffalo Braves took Bird Averitt for $125,000. The Indiana Pacers took Wil Jones for $50,000. The New York Nets took Jan Van Breda Kolff for $60,000. The San Antonio Spurs took Louie Dampier for $20,000.

In contrast to Brown receiving $3 million in cash for the Colonels, the Spirits of St. Louis' owners received $2.2 million in cash along with a 1/7 share of each of the four remaining teams' television income in perpetuity. That deal netted the Spirits ownership about $300 million until 2014, when the league decided to buy out most of the deal for $500 million.

== Basketball Hall of Famers ==
Kentucky Colonels Hall of Famers
Players
No.	Name	Position	Tenure	Inducted
44	Dan Issel	C/F	1970–1975	1993
53	Artis Gilmore	C	1971–1976	2011
10	Louie Dampier	G	1967–1976	2015
Coaches
Frank Ramsey ^{1}		Head coach	1970–1971	1982
Hubie Brown ^{2}		Head coach	1974–1976	2005

Notes:

- ^{1} Inducted as a player. Never played for the team.
- ^{2} Inducted as a contributor.

== Season-by-season ==
ABA champions	ABA finalists	Division champions	Playoff berth

Season	League	Division	Finish	W	L	Win%	Playoffs	Awards	Coach
Kentucky Colonels
1967–68	ABA	Eastern	4th	36	42	.462	Lost Division Semifinals (Muskies) 2–3	—	John Givens (5–12); Gene Rhodes (31–30)
1968–69	ABA	Eastern	3rd	42	36	.538	Lost Division Semifinals (Pacers) 3–4	—	Gene Rhodes
1969–70	ABA	Eastern	2nd	45	39	.536	Won Division Semifinals (Nets) 4–1; Lost Division Finals (Pacers) 1–4	—	Gene Rhodes
1970–71	ABA	Eastern	2nd	44	40	.524	Won Division Semifinals (Floridians) 4–2; Won Division Finals (Squires) 4–2; Lost ABA Finals (Stars) 3–4	Dan Issel (ROY)	Gene Rhodes (10–5); Alex Groza (2–0); Frank Ramsey (32–35)
1971–72	ABA	Eastern	1st	68	16	.810	Lost Division Semifinals (Nets) 2–4	Dan Issel (ASG MVP); Artis Gilmore (ABA MVP); Artis Gilmore (ROY)	Joe Mullaney
1972–73	ABA	Eastern	2nd	56	28	.667	Won Division Semifinals (Squires) 4–1; Won Division Finals (Cougars) 4–3; Lost ABA Finals (Pacers) 3–4	—	Joe Mullaney
1973–74	ABA	Eastern	2nd	53	31	.631	Won Division Semifinals (Cougars) 4–0; Lost Division Finals (Nets) 0–4	Artis Gilmore (ASG MVP); Babe McCarthy (ABA COY)	Babe McCarthy
1974–75	ABA	Eastern	1st (Note: The Colonels tied the New York Nets for first place in the Eastern Division. A one-game playoff was played on April 4, 1975, where the Colonels defeated the Nets 108–99, and thus the Nets finished second.)	58	26	.690	Won Division Semifinals (Sounds) 4–0; Won Division Finals (Spirits) 4–1; Won ABA Finals (Pacers) 4–1	Artis Gilmore (Playoffs MVP)	Hubie Brown
1975–76	ABA	— (Note: The league abolished division play during the season.)	4th	46	38	.548	Won First Round (Pacers) 2–1; Lost ABA Semifinals (Nuggets) 3–4	—	Hubie Brown

Statistic	Wins	Losses	Win%
Regular season record	448	296	.602
Postseason record	55	43	.561
Regular and postseason record	503	339	.597

== Broadcast media ==
Colonels games were broadcast throughout their history on WHAS Radio, the Louisville market's top-rated station at the time and a 50,000-watt clear-channel station, which meant that Colonels broadcasts could be heard over much of the continental United States at night. Van Vance was the play-by-play announcer for nearly all of the games in the franchise's history, with Cawood Ledford (better known as the longtime voice of the University of Kentucky Wildcats) behind the microphone as well, sometimes as color analyst beside Vance.

The Colonels had some games broadcast on various local television stations, but were usually only seen on TV during the ABA network games.

== See also ==
- Kentucky Colonels (ABA 2000)
- Sports in Louisville, Kentucky
- 1968 ABA Playoffs
- 1969 ABA Playoffs
- 1970 ABA Playoffs
- 1971 ABA Playoffs
- 1972 ABA Playoffs
- 1973 ABA Playoffs
- 1974 ABA Playoffs
- 1975 ABA Playoffs
- 1976 ABA Playoffs
- 1973–74 Kentucky Colonels season
- 1974–75 Kentucky Colonels season
