= 1968 ABA draft =

Basketball player selection

General information
- Sport: Basketball
- Dates: March 9, 1968 (Rounds 1–5); April 27, 1968 (Rounds 6–10); May 5, 1968 (Rounds 11–15)
- Location: Louisville, Kentucky (March); Los Angeles, California (April); Minneapolis, Minnesota (May)

Overview
- 167 total selections in 15 rounds
- League: American Basketball Association
- Teams: 11 (excluding one team relocating and rebranding to another team during the draft process)
- First selection: Elvin Hayes, Houston Mavericks

The 1968 ABA draft was the second draft done by the American Basketball Association (ABA), an upstart rivaling league to the National Basketball Association (NBA) that they would eventually merge with as a part of the NBA nearly a decade later. This year's draft saw an increased number of overall rounds used with the draft, with most teams going up to at least 15 rounds as opposed to the 12 rounds most teams used from the previous year's draft. Much like their first ever draft, this draft was also held as a "secret draft", though the more specific aspect of this draft had the first five rounds in mind be held as a "secret evaluation draft" by having the first five rounds of this year's draft be conducted in Louisville, Kentucky (home of the Kentucky Colonels) weeks before the 1968 NCAA University Division basketball tournament concluded to have the young talents get an early jump into professional basketball before they entered the 1968 NBA draft on April 1 for the first round before having a second chance to play for the ABA again on both April 27 and May 5 (with those two draft days being held in Los Angeles and Minneapolis (home of two out of four future relocated ABA teams) respectively) before the NBA continued their own draft properly on May 8. However, the early "secret evaluation draft" proved to be a bust for the ABA in terms of getting key star talents to successfully sign up with the ABA instead, as both the No. 1 pick that year in Elvin Hayes and Wes Unseld both decided not to join the nearby teams that drafted them (the Houston Mavericks via the University of Houston for Hayes and the Kentucky Colonels via the University of Louisville for Unseld respectively) and instead play for the San Diego Rockets and Baltimore Bullets (now Houston Rockets and Washington Wizards) in the NBA respectively, though the ABA would find a couple of other underrated gems this year despite those initial failures. This draft also became the last draft that the Anaheim Amigos would participate in under that name, as following the end of the "secret evaluation draft" in March, the team would move to nearby Los Angeles, California to become the Los Angeles Stars, taking on that franchise's entire history and draft stock in the process entering the rest of that draft period in April and May. After this draft period concluded, it would also become the last draft period for the Minnesota Muskies and New Jersey Americans as well, as after their own drafts ended, the Muskies moved to Miami, Florida to become the Miami Floridians, while the Americans permanently moved up to the New York City area for the rest of their ABA tenure to become the New York Nets going forward. (The defending champion Pittsburgh Pipers also moved during this season as well, with them going to Minnesota to become the Minnesota Pipers (potentially as a means of having an ABA team remaining in their city's headquarters at the time), though this wouldn't be the last season they'd draft under the Pittsburgh Pipers name.) This draft was also notable for it being the first area of interest where the ABA had potential legal grounds to allow for a merger with the NBA to occur due to them discovering a leaked document from the NBA by a disgruntled ex-NBA employee revealing grounds for a potential antitrust lawsuit to occur otherwise (the ironic part is the ABA would later admit to engaging in the same sort of practices that the NBA did at the time as well, though they didn't write their specific plans down on paper, which made such grounds for a lawsuit more likely on their end).

== Draftee career notes ==
Elvin Hayes from the University of Houston was selected first overall by the Houston Mavericks, a team nearby Hayes' own university location. In addition to him, sometime during the first round after the Mavericks' selection, Wes Unseld from the University of Louisville was selected in the first round as well by the Kentucky Colonels, a team that was also nearby Unseld's own university location. Despite the favorable results in mind, both Hayes and Unseld would decline playing in the ABA to join up with the NBA instead, with Unseld later winning both the Rookie of the Year and MVP awards in his rookie season for the NBA akin to that of Wilt Chamberlain. Both Hayes and Unseld were also named members of the 50 Greatest Players in NBA History and NBA 75th Anniversary Team, as well as won the 1978 NBA Finals championship as teammates while with the Washington Bullets. Another Hall of Fame player, Jo Jo White, was selected during the first five rounds of the draft by the Dallas Chaparrals while playing in what would have been his junior year at the University of Kansas, but unlike Hayes and Unseld, he opted to stay in Kansas for another year before being drafted by the Boston Celtics in the following year's NBA draft, winning two NBA Finals championships while with Boston throughout his tenure. One more Hall of Famer, Rick Adelman, was selected during the last later rounds of the ABA draft by the Los Angeles Stars following their name change from the Anaheim Amigos months prior, with Adelman being a successful all-time coach following his playing career in the NBA with a coaching career in the NBA lasting from 1989 until 2014, with his most successful stints coming from his time with the Portland Trail Blazers and Sacramento Kings.

Out of 92 overall ABA All-Stars, there were ten players eligible to be selected in this year's draft that made it to at least one ABA All-Star Game (notably later selection Ron Boone, Warren Jabali, Glen Combs, 1967 ABA draft pick Rich Jones, Mike Lewis, Jim Eakins, Mervin Jackson, Julius Keye, and Gene Moore), with Chuck Williams also being a two-time ABA All-Star despite not being drafted by the ABA this year following a two-year break from playing professional basketball himself after being drafted late in the 1968 NBA draft. In addition to them, this year's draft marked the only time in ABA history where a player was able to make to an All-ABA Team without making it to a single ABA All-Star Game, with Larry Cannon being able to make it to the All-ABA Second Team in 1971 due to his incredible production in his second season while not being able to be considered productive enough to be considered an ABA All-Star for at least that particular year, never mind any other season of play. In addition to Cannon's sole appearance, Boone would get two All-ABA Team appearances while Jabali got an All-ABA First Team spot in 1973, as well as won both the league's Rookie of the Year Award and the Playoffs MVP Award in 1969 for his performance with the Oakland Oaks that season, and was named the ABA's All-Star MVP in 1973. Julius Keye would also be named a two-time member of the ABA's All-Defensive Team during the first two seasons that designation was created; he was one of seven people to be named a member of the All-Defensive Team for the ABA twice, the second-most times it happened in the league's existence. Interestingly, one selection from this year's draft, (likely) fifth-round pick Mike Warren of UCLA by the Anaheim Amigos, decided to forgo playing professional basketball entirely, opting to instead spend his entire professional career as an actor. Finally, one player that joined the Los Angeles Stars after this draft concluded, Elvin Ivory, joined the Stars despite going undrafted this year due to him being a sophomore from the University of Southwestern Louisiana at the time of this year's draft; he would be the first sophomore player to join the ABA or any professional basketball league before changes would be made toward both the ABA and NBA in the following years to come.

== Historic draft notes ==
For the second year in a row, no generally known record of which player was taken in which draft round outside of Elvin Hayes as the No. 1 pick by the Houston Mavericks (alongside the general notation of what the first round was for every team here); as well the first two-round selections of the Anaheim Amigos (later renamed the Los Angeles Stars during the draft), Indiana Pacers, Kentucky Colonels, Minnesota Muskies, and Oakland Oaks (which included a first-round pick acquired by the New Orleans Buccaneers by a 1967 ABA draft day trade); the first five-round selections by the Denver Rockets and defending champion Pittsburgh Pipers; the fifth-round pick of the Minnesota Muskies; the seventh-round pick of the Dallas Chaparrals; and the additional round selections made by the Dallas Chaparrals, Los Angeles Stars, and New Jersey Americans (one made by Dallas and New Jersey each, while two made by the Stars) was publicly kept throughout the ABA's second season of draft history as of 2025. The reason why this was the case related to the secret nature of their draft period during this year combined with the various behind-the-scenes strategies ABA teams employed at the time to get key players of interest to try and sign up with them over other teams instead, especially out in the rivaling NBA. However, if one were to use the records from the inaugural ABA season as a guide for draft ordering for at least most of the rounds in this draft, then the order from the worst to best ABA teams in this draft would be from this following order: Oakland Oaks, Anaheim Amigos/Los Angeles Stars, Houston Mavericks, New Jersey Americans (via disqualification tiebreaker), Kentucky Colonels (via playoff tiebreaker won through disqualification), Indiana Pacers, Denver Rockets, Dallas Chaparrals, New Orleans Buccaneers, Minnesota Muskies, and Pittsburgh Pipers. During the months between March and April, the Anaheim Amigos moved from Anaheim, California to nearby Los Angeles to become the Los Angeles Stars, with the Stars retaining the Amigos' team history and assets, including draft picks, in the process of it all. After this draft period concluded in May, however, the New Jersey Americans would return to an original plan of theirs with playing up in New York City by becoming the New York Nets for the rest of their ABA tenure (partially because the team owners didn't like the fans shortening the name to "Amerks" due to it sounding Communist to them and partially because the team wanted to continue the younger New York team tradition of having a short word ending with the "ets" suffix being the new franchise name similar to the Mets in the MLB and Jets of the then-AFL later turned NFL) following a failed permanent home move to New Jersey in relation to a forced disqualification for a playoff qualifying match at home against the Kentucky Colonels (though ironically, it'd have the team play in the same arena that initially disqualified them from playoff qualification last season on a more permanent basis (at least at first), but with new floor boards in place to avoid a repeat scenario like their last game of that inaugural season from occurring ever again), while the Minnesota Muskies would move down to Miami, Florida to become the Miami Floridians and the defending champion Pittsburgh Pipers would move up to Minnesota to become the Minnesota Pipers (presumably in an attempt to have a home team nearby the ABA's headquarters). Any players that have a ‡ next to their names during this draft period mean that these players were selected for the ABA All-Time Team in 1997.

== Draft ==
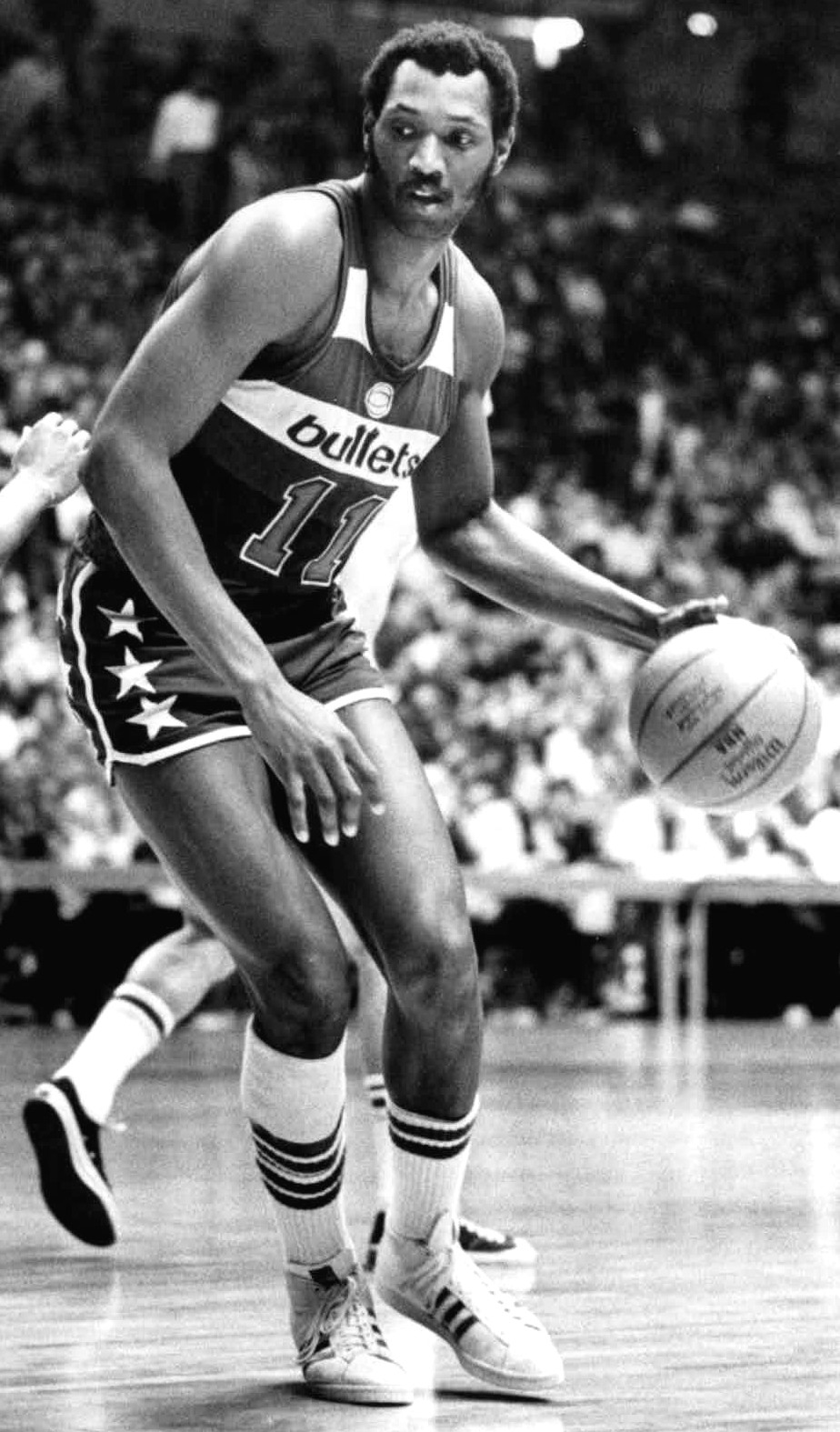
Elvin Hayes was selected as the first pick of the 1968 ABA Draft by the Houston Mavericks.

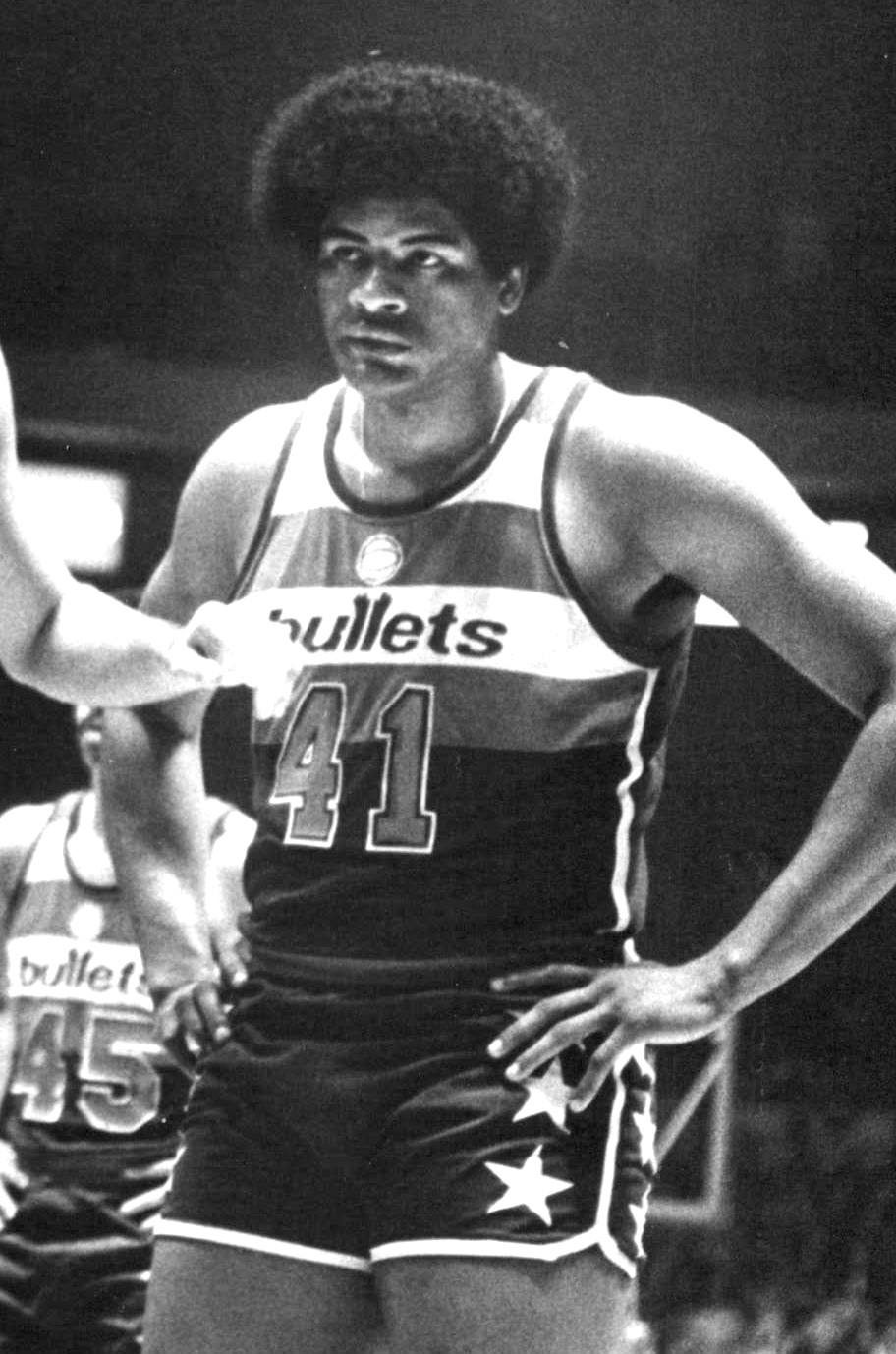
Wes Unseld was selected in the first round of the 1968 ABA Draft by the Kentucky Colonels.

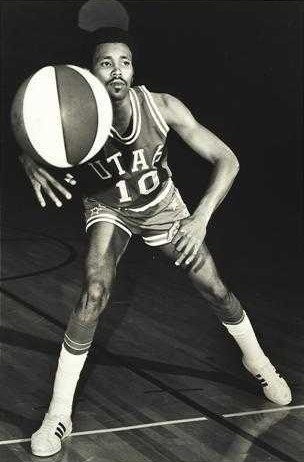
Mervin Jackson was selected in the second round of the 1968 ABA Draft by the Anaheim Amigos one month before they moved to Los Angeles and rebranded themselves as the Los Angeles Stars.

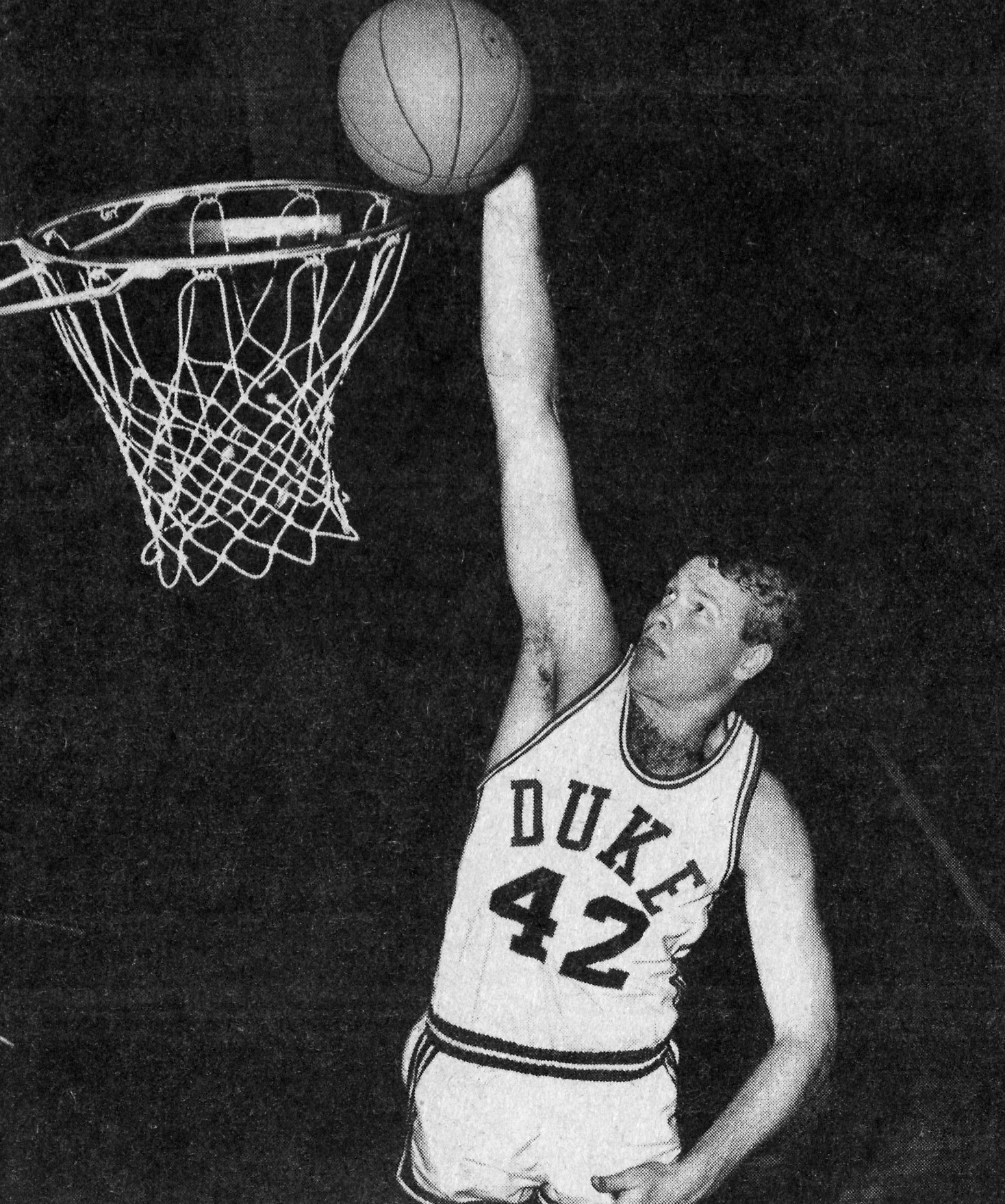
Mike Lewis was selected in the second round of the 1968 ABA Draft by the Indiana Pacers.

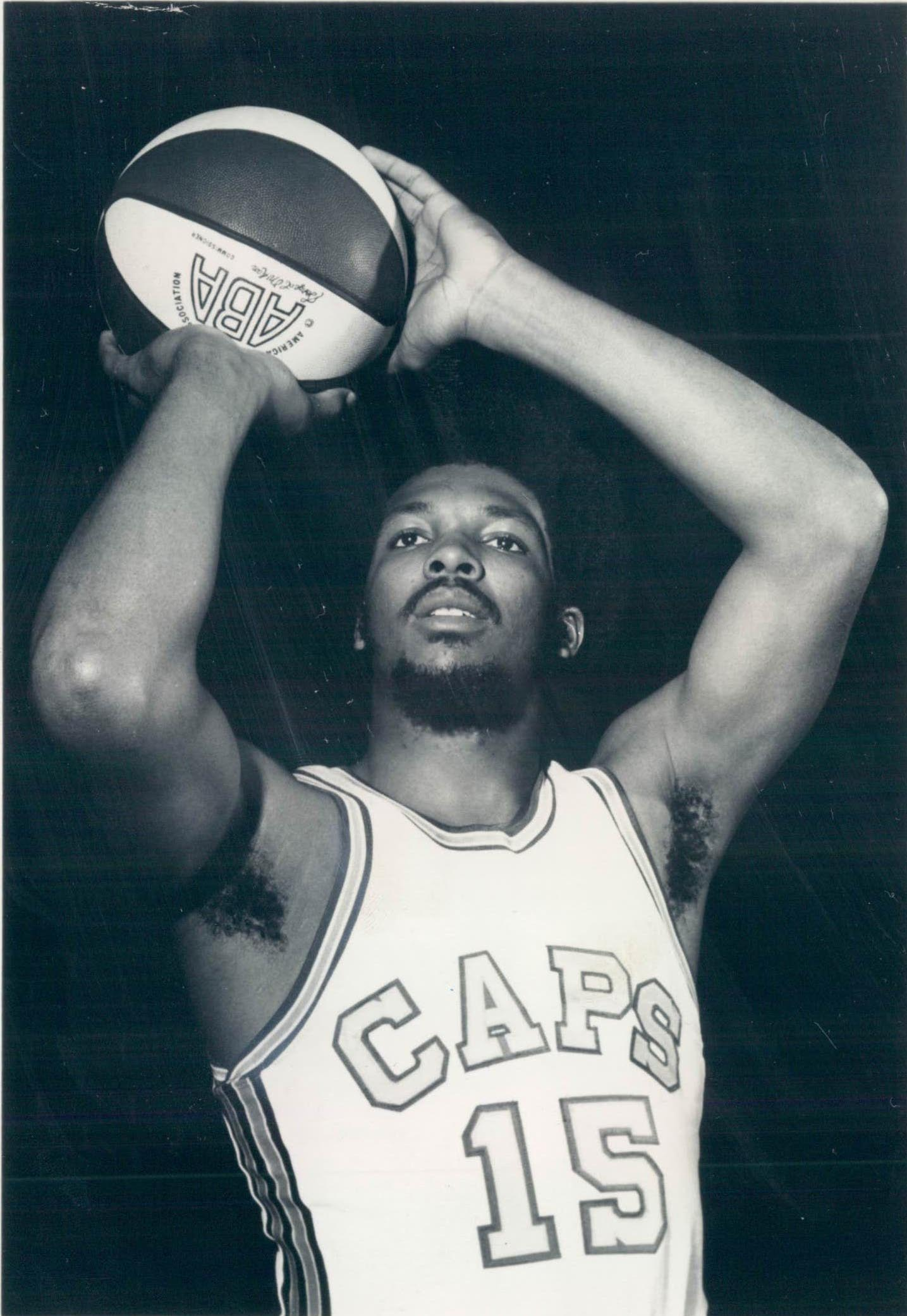
Warren Armstrong (later going by Warren Jabali once entering the ABA) was selected in one of the later first five rounds (as early as the third round) of the 1968 ABA Draft by the Oakland Oaks.

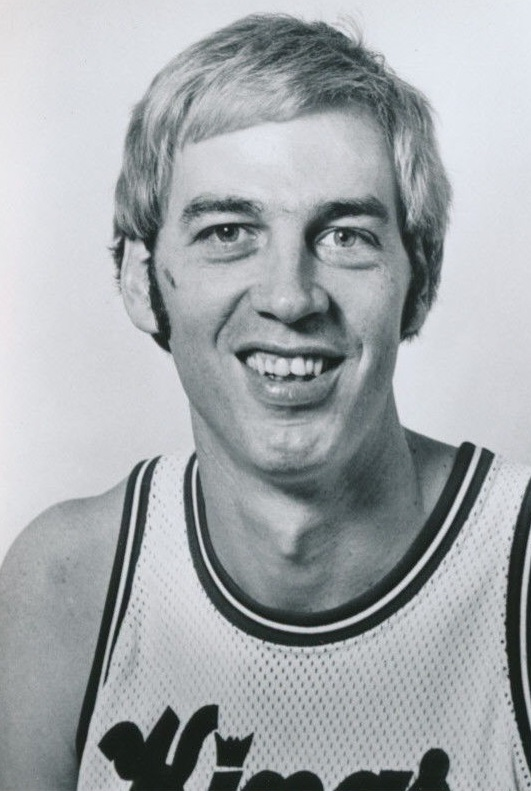
Jim Eakins was selected in one of the later first five rounds (as early as the third or fourth round) of the 1968 ABA Draft by the Oakland Oaks.

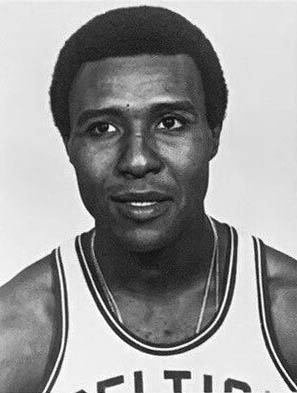
Jo Jo White was selected in one of the later first five rounds of the 1968 ABA Draft by the Dallas Chaparrals.

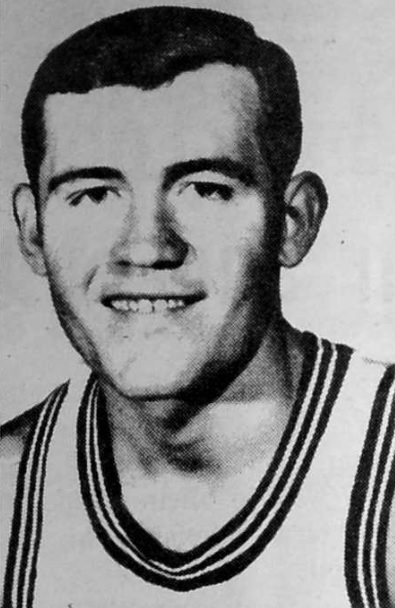
Glen Combs was selected in the seventh round of the 1968 ABA Draft by the Dallas Chaparrals.

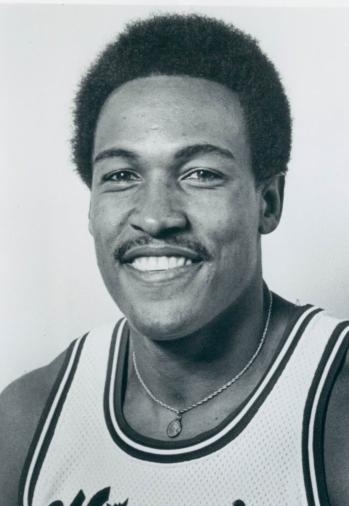
Ron Boone was selected in one of the later rounds (presumably as high as the sixth or eighth round) of the 1968 ABA Draft by the Dallas Chaparrals.

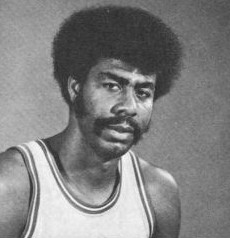
Gene Moore was selected in one of the later rounds (presumably as high as the ninth round) of the 1968 ABA Draft by the Kentucky Colonels.

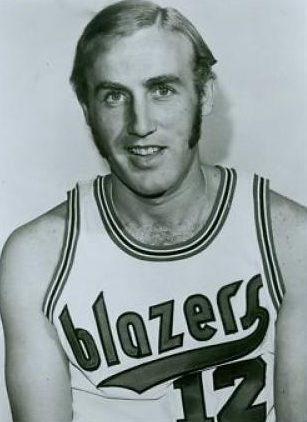
Rick Adelman was selected in one of the later rounds (presumably as early as the eleventh round) of the 1968 ABA Draft by the Los Angeles Stars months following the team's rebrand from the Anaheim Amigos.

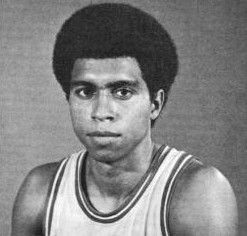
Chuck Williams was one of the first ever successful undrafted players in an ABA draft class despite being drafted in the 1968 NBA draft and not playing professionally until 1970.

Anaheim Amigos / Los Angeles Stars
First five rounds (each round is not specified here for the Anaheim Amigos unless stated otherwise):

- No. 1. Larry Miller, University of North Carolina (Sr.)
- No. 2. Mervin Jackson, University of Utah (Sr.)
- Ed Johnson, Tennessee State University (Sr.)
- George Stone, Marshall University (Sr.)
- Michael Warren, UCLA (Sr.)

Extra Rounds (each round is not specified for the Los Angeles Stars):

- Carl Fuller, Bethune–Cookman University (Sr.)
- Ed Leggett, Rocky Mountain College (Sr.)
- Lou Shepherd, Southwest Missouri State College (Sr.)
- Bob Warren, Vanderbilt University (Sr.)
- Eldridge Webb, University of Tulsa (Sr.)
- Rick Adelman, Loyola University of Los Angeles (Sr.)
- Brian Brunkhorst, Marquette University (Sr.)
- Ben Foster, Pasadena City College (Sr.)
- Lloyd Higgins, Pasadena City College (Sr.)
- Phil Horns, University of Texas at El Paso (Sr.)
- Mike LaRoche, Cal Poly (Sr.)
- Cary Smith, California State College at Los Angeles (Sr.)

Dallas Chaparrals
First five rounds (each round is not specified here unless stated otherwise):

- No. 1. John Smith Jr., Southern Colorado State College (Sr.)
- Shaler Halimon, Utah State University (Sr.)
- Rich Jones, Memphis State University (Jr.)
- Bob Lewis, South Carolina State College (Sr.)
- Jo Jo White, University of Kansas (Jr.)

Extra Rounds (each round is not specified here unless stated otherwise):

- No. 6. Wally Anderzunas, University of Creighton (Jr.)
- No. 7. Glen Combs, Virginia Polytechnic Institute (Sr.)
- Ron Boone, Idaho State University (Sr.)‡
- Charles "C.A." Core, Southeastern Louisiana College (Sr.)
- Roy Manning, Lane College (Sr.)
- Billy Arnold, University of Texas (Sr.)
- Gene Jones, University of Missouri (Sr.)
- Gene Littles, High Point College (Sr.)
- Mickey McCarty, Texas Christian University (Sr.)
- Alvin Pettit, Central Missouri State College (Sr.)
- Willie Worsley, University of Texas at El Paso (Sr.)

Denver Rockets
First five rounds:

- #1. Tom Boerwinkle, University of Tennessee (Sr.)
- No. 2. Walt Piatkowski, Bowling Green State University (Sr.)
- No. 3. Bill Hewitt, University of Southern California (Sr.)
- No fourth-round pick this time around for Denver.
- No. 5. Butch Booker, Cheyney State College (Jr.)

Extra Rounds (each round is not specified):

- Harry Hollines, University of Denver (Sr.)
- Charles Parks, Idaho State University (Sr.)
- Vernon Payne, Indiana University (Sr.)
- Willie Rogers, University of Oklahoma (Sr.)
- Glynn Saulters, Northeast Louisiana State College (Sr.)
- Ken Hall, Westminster College (Sr.)
- Melvin Jones, Albany State College (Sr.)
- Julius Keye, Alcorn A&M College (Jr.)
- Mickey Smith, Memphis State University (Sr.)
- Oscar Smith, Elizabeth City State College (Sr.)

Houston Mavericks
First five rounds:

- #1. Elvin Hayes, University of Houston (Sr.)
- No. 2. Don Chaney, University of Houston (Sr.)
- No. 3. Art Beatty, American University (Sr.)
- No. 4. John Ray Godfrey, Abilene Christian College (Sr.)
- No. 5. Aaron Sellers, Jackson State College (Sr.)

Extra Rounds (each round is not specified):

- Martin Baietti, Manhattan College (Sr.)
- Rich Dumas, Northeastern State College (Sr.)
- Calvin Martin, Texas Southern University (Sr.)
- Mike Nordholz, University of Alabama (Sr.)
- Dan Smith, Howard Payne College (Sr.)
- Sam Butler, Southern University (Sr.)
- Warren Chapman, Duke University (Sr.)
- Bill Gaines, East Texas State University (Sr.)
- Jim Jones, Beloit College (Sr.)
- Frank Standard, University of South Carolina (Sr.)

Indiana Pacers
First five rounds (each round is not specified here unless stated otherwise):

- No. 1. Don May, University of Dayton (Sr.)
- No. 2. Mike Lewis, Duke University (Sr.)
- Don Dee, St. Mary of the Plains College (Sr.)
- Bob Quick, Xavier University (Sr.)
- Phil Wagner, Georgia Institute of Technology (Sr.)

Extra Rounds (each round is not specified):

- Dave Benedict, Central Washington State College (Sr.)
- Rudy Bogad, St. John's University (Sr.)
- Jerry Newsom, Indiana State University (Sr.)
- Rich Niemann, St. Louis University (Sr.)
- Jack Thompson, University of South Carolina (Sr.)
- Greg Cisson, Rider College (Sr.)
- Bobby Hooper, University of Dayton (Sr.)
- Butch Joyner, Indiana University (Sr.)
- Tom Neimeier, University of Evansville (Sr.)

Kentucky Colonels
First five rounds (each round is not specified here unless stated otherwise):

- No. 1. Wes Unseld, University of Louisville (Sr.)
- No. 2. Wayne Chapman, Western Kentucky University (Sr.)
- Willie Davis, North Texas State University (Sr.)
- Al Dixon, Bowling Green State University (Sr.)
- Fred Foster, Miami University (Ohio) (Sr.)

Extra Rounds (each round is not specified):

- Joe Gallagher, Pembroke State College (Sr.)
- Joe Kennedy, Duke University (Sr.)
- Manny Leaks, Niagara University (Sr.)
- Gene Moore, St. Louis University (Sr.)
- Greg Smith, Western Kentucky University (Sr.)
- Booker Brown, Middle Tennessee State University (Sr.)
- Al Hairston, Bowling Green State University (Sr.)
- Thad Jaracz, University of Kentucky (Sr.)
- Reggie Lacefield, Western Michigan University (Sr.)
- Bob Zoretich, DePaul University (Sr.)
- Butch Kaufman, Western Kentucky University (Sr.)
- Kermit Meystedt, Southeast Missouri State College (Sr.)
- John Snipes, Elizabeth City State College (Sr.)
- Robert "Bo" Wyenandt, Vanderbilt University (Sr.)

Minnesota Muskies
First five rounds:

- #1. Don Sidle, University of Oklahoma (Sr.)
- No. 2. Dallas Thornton, Kentucky Wesleyan College (Sr.)
- No. 3. Ron Nelson, University of New Mexico (Sr.)
- No. 4. Tom Kondla, University of Minnesota (Sr.)
- No. 5. Dan Sparks, Weber State College (Sr.)

Extra Rounds (each round is not specified):

- Ken Barnett, University of Delaware (Sr.)
- Joe Franklin, University of Wisconsin (Sr.)
- Darryl Jones, St. Benedict's College (Sr.)
- Al Knott, Cedarville College (Sr.)
- Jerry Waugh, University of Northern Iowa (Sr.)
- Lyndall Conway, University of Albuquerque (Sr.)
- Jim Garza, Detroit Institute of Technology (Sr.)
- Willie Iverson, Central Michigan University (Sr.)
- Terry Porter, St. Cloud State University (Sr.)
- Jim Sterkin, University of Detroit (Sr.)

New Jersey Americans
First four rounds (each round is not specified here unless stated otherwise):

- No. 1. Joe Allen, Bradley University (Sr.)
- Dick Cunningham, Murray State University (Sr.)
- Rod Knowles, Davidson College (Sr.)
- Don Smith, Iowa State University (Sr.)

Extra Rounds (each round is not specified):

- Steve Adelman, Boston College (Sr.)
- Eddie Biedenbach, North Carolina State University (Sr.)
- Ron Guziak, Duquesne University (Sr.)
- Pete O'Dea, St. Peter's College (Sr.)
- Bill Soens, University of Miami (Florida) (Sr.)
- Bill Butler, St. Bonaventure University (Sr.)
- John Chamberlain, C. W. Post College (Sr.)
- Tony Koski, Providence College (Sr.)
- Bill Langheld, Fordham University (Sr.)
- Art Stephenson, University of Rhode Island (Sr.)
- Harry Laurie, St. Peter's College (Sr.)

New Orleans Buccaneers
First five rounds (each round is not specified here unless stated otherwise):

- No. 1. Charlie Paulk, Northeastern State College (Sr.)
- Mike Butler, Memphis State University (Sr.)
- Rich Johnson, Grambling College (Sr.)
- Ron Williams, West Virginia University (Sr.)
- Mark LaMoreaux, Lenoir–Rhyne College (Sr.)

Extra Rounds (each round is not specified):

- Charles Alford, East Carolina University (Sr.)
- Ted Campbell, North Carolina A&T State University (Sr.)
- Lee Davis, North Carolina Central University (Sr.)
- Dave Williams, Mississippi State University (Sr.)
- Jasper Wilson, Southern University (Sr.)

Oakland Oaks
First five rounds (each round is not specified here unless stated otherwise):

- No. 1. Garfield Smith, Eastern Kentucky University (Sr.) [acquired via trade with New Orleans]
- No. 2. Henry Logan, Western Carolina University (Sr.)
- Warren Armstrong, Wichita State University (Sr.)‡
- Jim Eakins, Brigham Young University (Sr.)
- Skip Harlicka, University of South Carolina (Sr.)
- Bonus pick No. 1 for Oakland: Bob Kauffman, Guilford College (Sr.)
- Bonus pick No. 2 for Oakland: Stuart Lantz, University of Nebraska (Sr.)

Extra Rounds (each round is not specified):

- Jim McKean, Washington State University (Sr.)
- Bud Ogden, Santa Clara University (Jr.)
- Richard "Rusty" Parker, University of Miami (Florida) (Sr.)
- Lloyd Peterson, Oregon State University (Sr.)
- John Q. Trapp, Nevada Southern University (Sr.)
- Russ Critchfield, University of California (Sr.)
- Hal Grant, Pepperdine College (Sr.)
- Art Harris, Stanford University (Sr.)
- Bryan Phillips, Valdosta State College (Sr.)
- Tony Sapit, Carroll College (Sr.)

Pittsburgh Pipers
First five rounds:

- #1. Bill Hosket Jr., Ohio State University (Sr.)
- No. 2. Nick Pino, Kansas State University (Sr.)
- No. 3. Sam Williams, University of Iowa (Sr.)
- No. 4. Dave Newmark, Columbia University (Sr.)
- No. 5. Larry Newbold, Long Island University (Brooklyn) (Sr.)

Extra Rounds (each round is not specified):

- Roger Bohnenstiel, University of Kansas (Sr.)
- Clarence Brookins, Temple University (Sr.)
- John Haarlow, Princeton University (Sr.)
- Keith Hochstein, College of the Holy Cross (Sr.)
- Jeff Ockel, University of Utah (Sr.)
- Willie Betts, Bradley University (Sr.)
- Bill Jones, Fairfield University (Sr.)
- Greg Morris, Cornell University (Sr.)
- Bob Redd, Marshall University (Sr.)
- Bill Tindall, University of Massachusetts (Sr.)

=== Notable undrafted players ===
These players were officially considered draft eligible for the 1968 ABA draft and went undrafted this year, yet played at least one regular season or playoff game for the ABA before the eventual ABA-NBA merger occurred nearly a decade later on June 17, 1976.

Player	Pos.	Nationality	School/Club team
Mack Daughtry	G	United States	Albany State (Sr.)
Billy DeAngelis	PG	United States	Saint Joseph's (Sr.)
Elvin Ivory	F	United States	Southwestern Louisiana (So.)
Jim Kissane	F	United States	Boston College (Sr.)
Barry Orms	PG	United States	Saint Louis (Sr.)
Dwight Waller	SF	United States	Tennessee State Huntsmen (AAU)
Chuck Williams^{+}	PG	United States	Colorado (Sr.)
