= Detroit Pistons draft history =

The Detroit Pistons began their history in 1937 as the Fort Wayne Zollner Pistons, a semi-professional company basketball team based in Fort Wayne, Indiana. They would turn professional in 1941 when they joined the National Basketball League (NBL). In 1948, the team was renamed the Fort Wayne Pistons and joined the Basketball Association of America (BAA), merging with the NBL to form the NBA one year later. After nine seasons in Fort Wayne, the team relocated to Detroit in 1957 to compete financially with other big city teams.

To help the Pistons acquire local players, territorial picks were instituted from 1949 until 1965. Territorial picks were used as a type of special draft choice used in the NBA draft. Prior to the league's draft, a team could forfeit its first round draft pick and select a player from within 50 miles (80 km). Territorial picks were then eliminated when the draft was revamped in 1966. Before the 1989 NBA draft, the draft had more than two rounds. After 1989, the NBA agreed with the National Basketball Players' Association to limit drafts to two rounds. Teams can also trade their picks, so some years a team could have more than or less than two picks.

== Key ==
| Abbreviation | Meaning | Abbreviation | Meaning |
|---|---|---|---|
| T | Territorial pick | G | Guard |
| PG | Point guard | SG | Shooting guard |
| F | Forward | SF | Small forward |
| PF | Power forward | C | Center |
| | Naismith Basketball Hall of Famer | (#) | Retired Pistons' Number |
| | Selected for an NBA All-Star Game | | |
| | First overall NBA draft pick | | |

== Pistons (1957–present) ==
| Year | Round | Pick | Name | Nationality | From |
|---|---|---|---|---|---|
| 2026 | 1 | 21 | Karim López | Mexico | New Zealand Breakers (New Zealand) |
| 2025 | 2 | 37 | Chaz Lanier | United States | University of Tennessee |
| 2024 | 1 | 5 | Ron Holland | United States | NBA G League Ignite |
| 2024 | 2 | 53 | Cam Spencer | United States | University of Connecticut |
| 2023 | 1 | 5 | Ausar Thompson | United States | Overtime Elite |
| 2023 | 1 | 25 | Marcus Sasser | United States | University of Houston |
| 2022 | 1 | 5 | Jaden Ivey | United States | Purdue |
| 2022 | 2 | 46 | Ismaël Kamagate | France | Paris Basketball |
| 2021 | 1 | 1 | Cade Cunningham | United States | Oklahoma State |
| 2021 | 2 | 37 | JT Thor | United States | Auburn |
| 2021 | 2 | 42 | Isaiah Livers | United States | Michigan |
| 2021 | 2 | 52 | Luka Garza | United States | Iowa |
| 2020 | 1 | 7 | Killian Hayes | France | Ratiopharm Ulm (Germany) |
| 2019 | 1 | 15 | Sekou Doumbouya | France | Limoges CSP |
| 2019 | 2 | 45 | Isaiah Roby | United States | Nebraska |
| 2018 | 2 | 38 | Khyri Thomas | United States | Creighton |
| 2018 | 2 | 42 | Bruce Brown | United States | Miami |
| 2017 | 1 | 12 | Luke Kennard | United States | Duke |
| 2016 | 1 | 18 | Henry Ellenson | United States | Marquette |
| 2016 | 2 | 49 | Michael Gbinije | United States | Syracuse |
| 2015 | 1 | 8 | Stanley Johnson | United States | Arizona |
| 2015 | 2 | 38 | Darrun Hilliard | United States | Villanova |
| 2014 | 2 | 38 | Spencer Dinwiddie | United States | Colorado |
| 2013 | 1 | 8 | Kentavious Caldwell-Pope | United States | Georgia |
| 2013 | 2 | 37 | Tony Mitchell | United States | North Texas |
| 2013 | 2 | 56 | Peyton Siva | United States | Louisville |
| 2012 | 1 | 9 | Andre Drummond | United States | Connecticut |
| 2012 | 2 | 39 | Khris Middleton | United States | Texas A&M |
| 2012 | 2 | 44 | Kim English | United States | Missouri |
| 2011 | 1 | 8 | Brandon Knight | United States | Kentucky |
| 2011 | 2 | 33 | Kyle Singler | United States | Duke |
| 2011 | 2 | 52 | Vernon Macklin | United States | Florida |
| 2010 | 1 | 7 | Greg Monroe | United States | Georgetown |
| 2010 | 2 | 35 | Terrico White | United States | Mississippi |
| 2009 | 1 | 15 | Austin Daye | United States | Gonzaga |
| 2009 | 2 | 35 | DaJuan Summers | United States | Georgetown |
| 2009 | 2 | 39 | Jonas Jerebko | Sweden | Angelico Biella (Italy) |
| 2009 | 2 | 44 | Chase Budinger | United States | Arizona |
| 2008 | 1 | 29 | D. J. White | United States | Indiana |
| 2008 | 2 | 59 | Deron Washington | United States | Virginia Tech |
| 2007 | 1 | 15 | Rodney Stuckey | United States | Eastern Washington |
| 2007 | 1 | 27 | Arron Afflalo | United States | UCLA |
| 2007 | 2 | 57 | Sammy Mejía | United States; Dominican Republic | DePaul |
| 2006 | 2 | 60 | Will Blalock | United States | Iowa State |
| 2005 | 1 | 26 | Jason Maxiell | United States | Cincinnati |
| 2005 | 2 | 56 | Amir Johnson | United States | Westchester HS, Los Angeles |
| 2005 | 2 | 60 | Alex Acker | United States | Pepperdine |
| 2004 | 2 | 54 | Rickey Paulding | United States | Missouri |
| 2003 | 1 | 2 | Darko Miličić | Serbia and Montenegro | Hemofarm Vršac (Serbia and Montenegro and Adriatic League) |
| 2003 | 1 | 25 | Carlos Delfino | Argentina | Skipper Bologna (Italy) |
| 2003 | 2 | 58 | Andreas Glyniadakis | Greece | AEK Athens (Greece) |
| 2002 | 1 | 23 | Tayshaun Prince | United States | Kentucky |
| 2001 | 1 | 9 | Rodney White | United States | Charlotte |
| 2001 | 2 | 37 | Mehmet Okur | Turkey | Efes Pilsen (Turkey) |
| 2000 | 1 | 14 | Mateen Cleaves | United States | Michigan State |
| 2000 | 2 | 44 | Brian Cardinal | United States | Purdue |
| 1999 | 2 | 54 | Melvin Levett | United States | Cincinnati |
| 1998 | 1 | 11 | Bonzi Wells | United States | Ball State |
| 1998 | 2 | 40 | Korleone Young | United States | Hargrave Military Academy |
| 1997 | 1 | 19 | Scot Pollard | United States | Kansas |
| 1997 | 2 | 31 | Charles O'Bannon | United States | UCLA |
| 1996 | 1 | 26 | Jerome Williams | United States | Georgetown |
| 1995 | 1 | 18 | Theo Ratliff | United States | Wyoming |
| 1995 | 1 | 19 | Randolph Childress | United States | Wake Forest |
| 1995 | 2 | 30 | Lou Roe | United States | Massachusetts |
| 1995 | 2 | 58 | Don Reid | United States | Georgetown |
| 1994 | 1 | 3 | Grant Hill | United States | Duke |
| 1994 | 2 | 48 | Jevon Crudup | United States | Missouri |
| 1993 | 1 | 10 | Lindsey Hunter | United States | Jackson State |
| 1993 | 1 | 11 | Allan Houston | United States | Tennessee |
| 1992 | 1 | 19 | Don MacLean | United States | UCLA |
| 1991 | 2 | 40 | Doug Overton | United States | La Salle |
| 1990 | 1 | 26 | Lance Blanks | United States | Texas |
| 1989 | 1 | 27 | Kenny Battle | United States | Illinois |
| 1988 | 2 | 30 | Fennis Dembo | United States | Wyoming |
| 1988 | 2 | 48 | Micheal Williams | United States | Baylor |
| 1988 | 3 | 72 | Lee Johnson | United States | Norfolk State |
| 1987 | 2 | 24 | Freddie Banks | United States | UNLV |
| 1987 | 3 | 65 | Eric White | United States | Pepperdine |
| 1987 | 4 | 88 | Dave Popson | United States | North Carolina |
| 1987 | 5 | 111 | Gerry Wright | United States | Iowa |
| 1987 | 6 | 134 | Antoine Joubert | United States | Michigan |
| 1987 | 7 | 157 | Mark Gottfried | United States | Alabama |
| 1986 | 1 | 11 | John Salley | United States | Georgia Tech |
| 1986 | 2 | 27 | Dennis Rodman | United States | Southeastern Oklahoma |
| 1986 | 4 | 86 | Chauncey Robinson | United States | Mississippi State |
| 1986 | 5 | 109 | Clarence Hanley | United States | Old Dominion |
| 1986 | 6 | 132 | Greg Grant | United States | Utah State |
| 1986 | 7 | 155 | Larry Polec | United States | Michigan State |
| 1985 | 1 | 18 | Joe Dumars | United States | McNeese State |
| 1985 | 3 | 60 | Andre Goode | United States | Northwestern |
| 1985 | 3 | 64 | Richie Johnson | United States | Evansville |
| 1985 | 4 | 87 | Spud Webb | United States | North Carolina State |
| 1985 | 5 | 110 | Mike Lahm | United States | Murray State |
| 1985 | 6 | 133 | Vincent Giles | United States | Eastern Michigan |
| 1985 | 7 | 156 | Frank James | United States | UNLV |
| 1984 | 1 | 20 | Tony Campbell | United States | Ohio State |
| 1984 | 2 | 32 | Eric Turner | United States | Michigan |
| 1984 | 3 | 66 | Kevin Springman | United States | Saint Joseph's |
| 1984 | 4 | 89 | Phillip Smith | United States | New Mexico |
| 1984 | 5 | 112 | Rick Doyle | United States | UTSA |
| 1984 | 6 | 135 | Rennie Bailey | United States | Louisiana Tech |
| 1984 | 7 | 158 | Barry Francisco | United States | Bloomsburg |
| 1984 | 8 | 181 | Dale Roberts | United States | Appalachian State |
| 1984 | 9 | 203 | Ben Tower | United States | Michigan State |
| 1984 | 10 | 225 | Dan Pelekoudas | United States | Michigan |
| 1983 | 1 | 8 | Antoine Carr | United States | Wichita State |
| 1983 | 3 | 55 | Erich Santifer | United States | Syracuse |
| 1983 | 4 | 78 | Steve Bouchie | United States | Indiana |
| 1983 | 5 | 101 | Ken Austin | United States | Rice |
| 1983 | 6 | 124 | Derek Perry | United States | Michigan State |
| 1983 | 7 | 147 | Rob Gonzalez | United States | Colorado |
| 1983 | 8 | 170 | George Wenzel | United States | Augustana (IL) |
| 1983 | 9 | 192 | Marlow McLain | United States | Eastern Michigan |
| 1983 | 10 | 213 | Ike Person | United States | Michigan |
| 1982 | 1 | 9 | Cliff Levingston | United States | Wichita State |
| 1982 | 1 | 18 | Ricky Pierce | United States | Rice |
| 1982 | 4 | 78 | Walker Russell | United States | Western Michigan |
| 1982 | 5 | 101 | John Ebeling | United States | Florida Southern |
| 1982 | 6 | 124 | Gary Holmes | United States | Minnesota |
| 1982 | 7 | 147 | Dean Marquardt | United States | Marquette |
| 1982 | 8 | 170 | Brian Nyenhuis | United States | Marquette |
| 1982 | 9 | 193 | Kevin Smith | United States | Michigan State |
| 1982 | 10 | 214 | David Coulthard | Canada | York (Ontario) |
| 1981 | 1 | 2 | Isiah Thomas | United States | Indiana |
| 1981 | 1 | 12 | Kelly Tripucka | United States | Notre Dame |
| 1981 | 4 | 71 | John May | United States | South Alabama |
| 1981 | 4 | 89 | Donnie Ray Koonce | United States | UNC Charlotte |
| 1981 | 5 | 94 | George DeVone | United States | UNC Charlotte |
| 1981 | 6 | 117 | Vince Brookins | United States | Iowa |
| 1981 | 7 | 140 | Greg Nance | United States | West Virginia |
| 1981 | 8 | 163 | Joe Schoen | United States | Saint Francis (PA) |
| 1981 | 9 | 185 | Eddie Baker | United States | Alcorn State |
| 1981 | 10 | 205 | Melvin Maxwell | United States | Western Michigan |
| 1980 | 1 | 17 | Larry Drew | United States | Missouri |
| 1980 | 2 | 45 | Brad Branson | United States | SMU |
| 1980 | 3 | 64 | Jonathan Moore | United States | Furman |
| 1980 | 4 | 70 | Darwin Cook | United States | Portland |
| 1980 | 5 | 93 | Tony Fuller | United States | Pepperdine |
| 1980 | 6 | 116 | Tony Turner | United States | Alaska–Anchorage |
| 1980 | 7 | 139 | Carl Pierce | United States | Gonzaga |
| 1980 | 8 | 161 | Leroy Loggins | United States | Fairmont State |
| 1980 | 9 | 180 | Terry Dupris | | Huron |
| 1979 | 1 | 4 | Greg Kelser | United States | Michigan State |
| 1979 | 1 | 10 | Roy Hamilton | United States | UCLA |
| 1979 | 1 | 15 | Phil Hubbard | United States | Michigan |
| 1979 | 2 | 29 | Tony Price | United States | Pennsylvania |
| 1979 | 3 | 48 | Terry Duerod | United States | Detroit |
| 1979 | 5 | 92 | Flintie Ray Williams | United States | UNLV |
| 1979 | 6 | 111 | Truman Claytor | United States | Kentucky |
| 1979 | 7 | 132 | Ken Jones | United States | Saint Mary's |
| 1979 | 8 | 150 | Rodney Lee | United States | Memphis State |
| 1979 | 9 | 170 | Val Bracey | United States | Central Michigan |
| 1979 | 10 | 187 | Willie Polk | United States | Grand Canyon |
| 1978 | 2 | 23 | Terry Tyler | United States | Detroit |
| 1978 | 2 | 29 | John Long | United States | Detroit |
| 1978 | 5 | 95 | Dave Caligaris | United States | Northeastern |
| 1978 | 6 | 117 | Audie Matthews | United States | Illinois |
| 1978 | 7 | 138 | Herb Entzminger | United States | Johnson C. Smith |
| 1978 | 8 | 157 | Earl Evans | United States | UNLV |
| 1978 | 9 | 174 | Ulice Payne | United States | Marquette |
| 1978 | 10 | 189 | Dave Grauzer | United States | Central Michigan |
| 1977 | 2 | 36 | Ben Poquette | United States | Central Michigan |
| 1977 | 3 | 58 | John Irving | United States | Hofstra |
| 1977 | 4 | 80 | Bruce King | United States | Iowa |
| 1977 | 5 | 102 | Jim Kennedy | United States | Missouri |
| 1977 | 6 | 124 | Herb Nobles | United States | Kansas |
| 1977 | 7 | 144 | Robert Lewis | United States | Johnson C. Smith |
| 1977 | 8 | 163 | Tim Appleton | United States | Kenyon |
| 1976 | 1 | 4 | Leon Douglas | United States | Alabama |
| 1976 | 3 | 38 | Phil Sellers | United States | Rutgers |
| 1976 | 4 | 55 | Scott Thompson | United States | Iowa |
| 1976 | 5 | 72 | Jim Hearns | | Marymount (KS) |
| 1976 | 6 | 90 | Russell Davis | United States | Virginia Tech |
| 1976 | 7 | 108 | Curt Peterson | United States | Puget Sound |
| 1976 | 8 | 126 | Randy Heary | United States | Illinois State |
| 1976 | 9 | 144 | Bill Martin | United States | Hartwick |
| 1976 | 10 | 161 | Bob Johnson | United States | Wisconsin |
| 1975 | 2 | 27 | Walter Luckett | United States | Ohio |
| 1975 | 3 | 44 | Pete Trgovich | United States | UCLA |
| 1975 | 4 | 64 | Lindsay Hairston | United States | Michigan State |
| 1975 | 5 | 81 | Cliff Pratt | United States | Shaw |
| 1975 | 6 | 98 | Allen Spruill | United States | North Carolina A&T |
| 1975 | 7 | 118 | Ike Williams | United States | Armstrong State |
| 1975 | 8 | 135 | John Kelley | United States | Dillard |
| 1975 | 9 | 151 | Terry Thomas | United States | Detroit |
| 1975 | 10 | 169 | Mickey Fox | Canada | Saint Mary's (Canada) |
| 1974 | 1 | 15 | Al Eberhard | United States | Missouri |
| 1974 | 2 | 33 | Eric Money | United States | Arizona |
| 1974 | 3 | 51 | Roland Grant | United States | New Mexico State |
| 1974 | 4 | 69 | Mickey Martin | United States | Pittsburgh |
| 1974 | 5 | 87 | Joe Newman | United States | Temple |
| 1974 | 6 | 105 | Mike Sylvester | United States | Dayton |
| 1974 | 7 | 123 | Sammy High | United States | Tulsa |
| 1974 | 8 | 141 | Greg Newman | United States | Drexel |
| 1974 | 9 | 158 | Gary Deitelhoff | United States | Millikin |
| 1974 | 10 | 175 | Bill Ligon | United States | Vanderbilt |
| 1973 | 3 | 44 | Dwight Lamar | United States | Southwestern Louisiana |
| 1973 | 3 | 50 | Larry Kenon | United States | Memphis State |
| 1973 | 4 | 61 | Ken Brady | United States | Michigan |
| 1973 | 5 | 78 | Henry Wilmore | United States | Michigan |
| 1973 | 6 | 95 | Dennis Johnson | United States | Ferris State |
| 1973 | 7 | 112 | Fred Smiley | United States | Northwood |
| 1973 | 8 | 129 | Ben Kelso | United States | Central Michigan |
| 1973 | 9 | 145 | Bill Kelgore | United States | Michigan State |
| 1973 | 10 | 159 | Bob Solomon | United States | Wayne State |
| 1973 | 11 | 171 | Len Paul | United States | Akron |
| 1973 | 12 | 180 | Clarence Carlisle | United States | Ferris State |
| 1972 | 1 | 9 | Bob Nash | United States | Hawaii |
| 1972 | 2 | 17 | Chris Ford | United States | Villanova |
| 1972 | 4 | 51 | Ernie Fleming | United States | Jacksonville |
| 1972 | 5 | 67 | Ernest Pettis | United States | Western Michigan |
| 1972 | 6 | 84 | Terry Benton | United States | Wichita State |
| 1972 | 7 | 101 | Bruce Anderson | United States | Arizona |
| 1972 | 8 | 117 | Ben Kelso | United States | Central Michigan |
| 1972 | 9 | 133 | Kessie Mangam | United States | Ferris State |
| 1972 | 10 | 146 | Kent Hollenbeck | United States | Kentucky |
| 1971 | 1 | 11 | Curtis Rowe | United States | UCLA |
| 1971 | 2 | 29 | Isaiah Wilson | United States | Baltimore |
| 1971 | 3 | 45 | Marv Roberts | United States | Utah State |
| 1971 | 4 | 62 | Jarrett Durham | United States | Duquesne |
| 1971 | 5 | 79 | Vincent White | United States | Savannah State |
| 1971 | 6 | 96 | Jim Larrañaga | United States | Providence |
| 1971 | 7 | 113 | Steve Kelly | United States | Brigham Young |
| 1971 | 8 | 130 | Wayne Jones | United States | Niagara |
| 1971 | 9 | 146 | Paul Botts | United States | Central Michigan |
| 1971 | 10 | 162 | Steve Butcher | United States | Pikeville |
| 1971 | 11 | 177 | Larry Saunders | United States | Duke |
| 1971 | 12 | 190 | Bob Horn | United States | Drake |
| 1971 | 13 | 202 | Willie Roberson | United States | Wyoming |
| 1971 | 14 | 212 | Art Davis | United States | Johnson C. Smith |
| 1971 | 15 | 221 | James Fleming | United States | Alcorn State |
| 1971 | 16 | 228 | Fred Smiley | United States | Detroit |
| 1971 | 17 | 232 | Leroy Jenkins | United States | Detroit |
| 1971 | 18 | 235 | Ike Bundy | United States | Lawrence Tech |
| 1971 | 19 | 237 | Ed Jenkins | United States | Shaw |
| 1970 | 1 | 1 | Bob Lanier | United States | St. Bonaventure |
| 1970 | 2 | 32 | Ken Warzynski | United States | DePaul |
| 1970 | 3 | 37 | Bob St. Pierre | United States | Hanover |
| 1970 | 3 | 47 | Jim Hayes | United States | Boston University |
| 1970 | 5 | 71 | Bill Jankans | United States | Long Beach State |
| 1970 | 6 | 88 | Seviro Brown | United States | DePaul |
| 1970 | 7 | 105 | Marv Copeland | United States | Michigan Lutheran High School |
| 1970 | 8 | 122 | Dan Issel | United States | Kentucky |
| 1970 | 9 | 139 | Alex Wynn | United States | Dartmouth |
| 1970 | 10 | 156 | Bruce Chapman | United States | Nevada |
| 1970 | 11 | 172 | Rick Anhauser | United States | North Carolina State |
| 1970 | 12 | 185 | Don Ogletree | United States | Cincinnati |
| 1970 | 13 | 195 | Ernest Hardy | United States | Harvard |
| 1970 | 14 | 205 | Randy Smith | United States | Buffalo State |
| 1970 | 15 | 215 | Dennis Clark | United States | Springfield |
| 1970 | 16 | 224 | Harvey Marlatt | United States | Eastern Michigan |
| 1969 | 1 | 4 | Terry Driscoll | United States | Boston College |
| 1969 | 2 | 19 | Willie Norwood | United States | Alcorn State |
| 1969 | 4 | 47 | Ted Wierman | United States | Washington State |
| 1969 | 5 | 61 | Steve Mix | United States | Toledo |
| 1969 | 6 | 75 | Larry Jeffries | United States | Trinity (TX) |
| 1969 | 7 | 89 | Steve Vandenberg | United States | Duke |
| 1969 | 8 | 103 | Bob Arnzen | United States | Notre Dame |
| 1969 | 9 | 117 | George Reynolds | United States | Houston |
| 1969 | 10 | 131 | Bill English | United States | Winston-Salem State |
| 1969 | 11 | 145 | Rusty Clark | United States | North Carolina |
| 1968 | 1 | 6 | Otto Moore | United States | Pan American |
| 1968 | 2 | 20 | Manny Leaks | United States | Niagara |
| 1968 | 3 | 25 | Don Dee | United States | St. Mary of the Plains |
| 1968 | 4 | 42 | Rich Niemann | United States | Saint Louis |
| 1968 | 5 | 56 | Carl Fuller | United States | Bethune–Cookman |
| 1968 | 6 | 70 | Wally Anderzunas | United States | Creighton |
| 1968 | 7 | 84 | Larry Newbold | United States | Long Island |
| 1968 | 8 | 98 | Harry Laurie | | Saint Peter's |
| 1968 | 9 | 112 | Vaughn Harper | | Syracuse |
| 1968 | 10 | 126 | Tom Baack | | Nebraska |
| 1967 | 1 | 1 | Jimmy Walker | United States | Providence |
| 1967 | 1 | 4 | Sonny Dove | United States | St. John's |
| 1967 | 2 | 14 | Steve Sullivan | | Georgetown |
| 1967 | 3 | 21 | Darrell Hardy | | Baylor |
| 1967 | 4 | 33 | Ronald Franz | | Kansas |
| 1967 | 5 | 45 | Paul Long | | Wake Forest |
| 1967 | 6 | 57 | Vaughn Harper | | Syracuse |
| 1967 | 7 | 69 | Bobby Lloyd | | Rutgers |
| 1967 | 8 | 81 | George Carter | | St. Bonaventure |
| 1967 | 12 | 125 | George Dalzell | | Colgate |
| 1967 | 13 | 135 | Matt Aitch | | Michigan State |
| 1966 | 1 | 2 | Dave Bing | United States | Syracuse |
| 1966 | 2 | 12 | Dorie Murrey | United States | Detroit |
| 1966 | 3 | 22 | Ollie Darden | United States | Michigan |
| 1966 | 4 | 32 | Jeff Congdon | | Brigham Young |
| 1966 | 5 | 42 | William Pickens | | Georgia Southern |
| 1966 | 6 | 52 | Carroll Hooser | | SMU |
| 1966 | 7 | 61 | Ted Manning | | North Carolina Central |
| 1966 | 8 | 70 | George McNeil | | Southern Illinois |
| 1965 | T | | Bill Buntin | United States | Michigan |
| 1965 | 2 | 11 | Tom Van Arsdale | United States | Indiana |
| 1965 | 3 | 20 | Ron Reed | United States | Notre Dame |
| 1965 | 4 | 29 | Jim King | United States | Oklahoma State |
| 1965 | 5 | 38 | Ted Manning | | North Carolina Central |
| 1965 | 6 | 47 | Barry Smith | | High Point |
| 1964 | 1 | 2 | Joe Caldwell | United States | Arizona State |
| 1964 | 2 | 9 | Les Hunter | United States | Loyola (Chicago) |
| 1964 | 3 | 18 | Wali Jones | United States | Villanova |
| 1964 | 4 | 27 | Jim Davis | | Colorado |
| 1964 | 5 | 36 | Ray Wolford | | Toledo |
| 1964 | 6 | 45 | Larry Phillips | | Rice |
| 1964 | 7 | 54 | Jerry Jackson | | Ohio |
| 1964 | 8 | 63 | Ralph Telken | | Rockhurst |
| 1963 | 1 | 4 | Eddie Miles | United States | Seattle |
| 1963 | 2 | 12 | Jerry Smith | | Furman |
| 1963 | 3 | 21 | Mike McCoy | | Miami (FL) |
| 1963 | 4 | 30 | Dave Erickson | | Marquette |
| 1963 | 5 | 39 | Bill Small | | Illinois |
| 1963 | 6 | 48 | Reggie Harding | United States | Detroit Eastern High School |
| 1963 | 7 | 57 | Ira Harge | | New Mexico |
| 1963 | 8 | 66 | Gary Silc | | Northern Michigan |
| 1963 | 9 | 71 | Ernie Durston | | Seattle |
| 1962 | T | | Dave DeBusschere | United States | Detroit |
| 1962 | 2 | 11 | Kevin Loughery | United States | St. John's |
| 1962 | 3 | 20 | Harold Hudgens | | Texas Tech |
| 1962 | 4 | 29 | Reggie Harding | United States | Detroit Eastern High School |
| 1962 | 5 | 38 | Lindbergh Moody | | South Carolina |
| 1962 | 6 | 47 | Ed Noe | | Morehead State |
| 1962 | 7 | 56 | John Bradley | | Lawrence |
| 1962 | 8 | 64 | Mike Rice | | Duquesne |
| 1962 | 9 | 73 | Bill Nelson | | Hamline |
| 1962 | 10 | 82 | Glenn Moore | | Oregon |
| 1961 | 1 | 4 | Ray Scott | United States | Portland |
| 1961 | 2 | 12 | Johnny Egan | United States | Providence |
| 1961 | 3 | 26 | Doug Kistler | | Duke |
| 1961 | 4 | 35 | George Finley | | Tennessee State |
| 1961 | 5 | 44 | Danny Doyle | | Belmont Abbey |
| 1961 | 6 | 53 | Lee Patrone | | West Virginia |
| 1961 | 7 | 62 | Burt Price | | Wittenberg |
| 1961 | 8 | 71 | Walter Ward | | Hampton |
| 1961 | 9 | 79 | Peter Baltic | | Kent State |
| 1961 | 10 | 86 | Wayne Monson | | Northern Michigan |
| 1961 | 11 | 94 | Richard Kraft | | Brockport State |
| 1960 | 1 | 4 | Jackie Moreland | United States | Louisiana Tech |
| 1960 | 2 | 12 | Ron Johnson | | Minnesota |
| 1960 | 3 | 20 | Frank Case | | Dayton |
| 1960 | 4 | 28 | Ken Remley | | West Virginia Wesleyan |
| 1960 | 5 | 36 | Willie Jones | | Northwestern |
| 1960 | 6 | 44 | Bill Lowry | | Christian Brothers |
| 1960 | 7 | 52 | Douglas Moe | United States | North Carolina |
| 1960 | 8 | 59 | Mike Yugovich | | Youngstown State |
| 1960 | 9 | 66 | Martin Holland | | Kentucky Wesleyan |
| 1960 | 10 | 73 | Joe Kennelly | | Dayton |
| 1960 | 11 | 78 | Mel Peterson | | Wheaton (IL) |
| 1960 | 12 | 83 | Don Dobbert | | Wheaton (IL) |
| 1960 | 13 | 87 | Lee Hopfenspirger | | Hamline |
| 1959 | 1 | 2 | Bailey Howell | United States | Mississippi State |
| 1959 | 2 | 7 | Tom Robitaille | | Rice |
| 1959 | 2 | 8 | Don Goldstein | | Louisville |
| 1959 | 3 | 16 | Gary Alcorn | | Fresno State |
| 1959 | 4 | 24 | George Lee | | Michigan |
| 1959 | 5 | 32 | Tony Windis | | Wyoming |
| 1959 | 6 | 40 | Lou Jordan | | Cornell |
| 1959 | 7 | 48 | Doug Smart | | Washington |
| 1959 | 8 | 55 | Chuck Curtis | | Pacific Lutheran |
| 1959 | 9 | 61 | Doyle Edmiston | | Hardin–Simmons |
| 1959 | 10 | 67 | Bruno Boin | | Washington |
| 1959 | 11 | 73 | M. C. Burton | | Michigan |
| 1958 | 2 | 10 | Barney Cable | | Bradley |
| 1958 | 3 | 18 | Roy DeWitz | | Kansas State |
| 1958 | 4 | 26 | Ralph Croswaite | | Western Kentucky |
| 1958 | 5 | 34 | Hank Morano | | Saint Peter's |
| 1958 | 6 | 42 | Shellie McMillon | | Bradley |
| 1958 | 7 | 50 | Ed Blair | | Western Michigan |
| 1958 | 8 | 58 | Jack Quiggle | | Michigan State |
| 1958 | 9 | 65 | Harry Marske | | North Dakota State |
| 1958 | 10 | 71 | Pete Gaudin | | Loyola (LA) |
| 1958 | 11 | 76 | Herb Merritt | | Tennessee Tech |
| 1958 | 12 | 80 | Jim Dew | | Alabama State |
| 1957 | 1 | 2 | Charlie Tyra | United States | Louisville |
| 1957 | 2 | 10 | Bob McCoy | United States | Grambling |
| 1957 | 3 | 18 | Bill Ebben | United States | Detroit |
| 1957 | 4 | 26 | Kurt Englebert | | Saint Joseph's |
| 1957 | 5 | 34 | Ron Kramer | | Michigan |
| 1957 | 6 | 42 | Walt Acamushko | | St. Francis (NY) |
| 1957 | 7 | 50 | Carl Boldt | | San Francisco |
| 1957 | 8 | 57 | Doug Bolstorff | | Minnesota |
| 1957 | 9 | 64 | Bob Lazor | | Pittsburgh |

== As Fort Wayne Pistons (1948–1956) ==
| Year | Round | Pick | Name | From |
|---|---|---|---|---|
| 1956 | 1 | 6 | Ron Sobieszczyk | DePaul |
| 1956 | | | Bruce Harris | Tennessee Tech |
| 1956 | | | Bob Kessler | Maryland |
| 1956 | | | Joe Lieber | Holy Cross |
| 1956 | | | John Schlimm | John Carroll |
| 1956 | | | Charles Slack | Marshall |
| 1956 | 3 | 22 | Bill Thieben | Hofstra |
| 1955 | 1 | 6 | Johnny Horan | Dayton |
| 1955 | 2 | 13 | Jesse Arnelle | Penn State |
| 1955 | 3 | 22 | Ron Bennink | Washington State |
| 1955 | 4 | 29 | Dick Howard | Case Western Reserve |
| 1955 | 5 | 38 | Cleo Littleton | Wichita State |
| 1955 | | | Don Belcher | LSU |
| 1955 | | | Tom Harrold | Colorado |
| 1955 | | | Happy Mahfouz | Spring Hill College |
| 1955 | | | Tom Mixon | Mercer |
| 1955 | | | Tom Mock | Colorado |
| 1955 | | | Bob Reiter | Missouri |
| 1955 | | | Ray Warren | TCU |
| 1954 | 1 | 4 | Dick Rosenthal | Notre Dame |
| 1954 | 2 | 13 | Arnold Short | Oklahoma City |
| 1954 | 3 | 22 | B. H. Born | Kansas |
| 1954 | 4 | 31 | Mel Thompson | NC State |
| 1954 | 5 | 40 | Dutch Burch | Pittsburgh |
| 1954 | 6 | 49 | Charlie Kraak | Indiana |
| 1954 | 7 | 58 | Bernie Janicki | Duke |
| 1954 | 8 | 67 | Don Bielke | Valparaiso |
| 1954 | 9 | 76 | Joel Hittleman | Loyola (MD) |
| 1954 | 10 | 84 | Phil Larson | BYU |
| 1954 | 11 | 93 | Forrest Jackson | Taylor |
| 1953 | 1 | 3 | Jack Molinas | Columbia |
| 1953 | | | Jim Bingham | Eastern Kentucky |
| 1953 | | | Mike Bodnar | St. Bonaventure |
| 1953 | | | Jim Bredar | Illinois |
| 1953 | | | George Glasgow | Fairleigh Dickinson |
| 1953 | | | William Hagan | Siena College |
| 1953 | | | Dean Kelley | Kansas |
| 1953 | | | Norb Lewinski | Notre Dame |
| 1953 | | | Dick White | Eastern Kentucky |
| 1952 | 1 | 3 | Dick Groat | Duke |
| 1952 | | | Bill Carlson | Fordham |
| 1952 | | | Hal Cerra | Duquesne |
| 1952 | | | Bob Clifton | Iowa |
| 1952 | | | Leo Corkery | St. Bonaventure |
| 1952 | | | Monk Meineke | Dayton |
| 1952 | | | Jim Ramstead | Stanford |
| 1952 | | | Lee Terrill | NC State |
| 1951 | 1 | 4 | Zeke Sinicola | Niagara |
| 1951 | 2 | 13 | Jack Kiley | Syracuse |
| 1951 | 3 | 23 | Jake Fendley | Northwestern |
| 1951 | 4 | 33 | Herb Hargett | Mississippi State |
| 1951 | 5 | 43 | Leo Johnson | Arizona |
| 1951 | 6 | 53 | Frank Clasbeek | Iowa |
| 1951 | 7 | 63 | Jim Ramstead | Stanford |
| 1951 | 8 | 73 | John Manning | Duquesne |
| 1950 | 1 | 7 | George Yardley | Stanford |
| 1950 | 2 | | Jim Riffey | Tulane |
| 1950 | 3 | | Art Burris | Tennessee |
| 1950 | 4 | | Len Rzeszewski | Indiana State |
| 1950 | 5 | | Ed Thompson | Kent State |
| 1950 | 6 | | Bob Metcalf | Valparaiso |
| 1950 | 7 | | Ed Jones | Tennessee |
| 1950 | 8 | | Billy Joe Adcock | Vanderbilt |
| 1950 | 9 | | Al Henningsen | Northwest Missouri State |
| 1949 | 1 | 3 | Bob Harris | Oklahoma A&M |
| 1949 | 2 | | John Oldham | Western Kentucky |
| 1949 | 3 | | Fred Schaus | West Virginia |
| 1949 | 4 | | Jerry Nagel | Loyola (IL) |
| 1949 | | | Dal Zuber | Toledo |
| 1948 | 1 | 8 | Ward Williams | Indiana |
| 1948 | | | Bobby Cook | Wisconsin |
| 1948 | | | Link Richmond | Arizona |
| 1948 | | | Kenny Rollins | Kentucky |
| 1948 | | | Murray Wier | Iowa |
