= Cliff Williams (basketball) =

American basketball player

Personal information
- Born: April 15, 1945 (age 81) Detroit, Michigan, U.S.
- Listed height: 6 ft 3 in (1.91 m)
- Listed weight: 180 lb (82 kg)

Career information
- High school: Southwestern (Detroit, Michigan)
- College: Bowling Green (1965–1966)
- NBA draft: 1968: undrafted
- Position: Shooting guard
- Number: 12

Career history
- 1968: Detroit Pistons
- Stats at NBA.com
- Stats at Basketball Reference

Clifford L. Williams (born April 15, 1945) is an American former professional basketball player. He played in three games for the Detroit Pistons and scored four total points.

== Career statistics ==
Legend
GP	Games played	GS	Games started	MPG	Minutes per game
FG%	Field goal percentage	3P%	3-point field goal percentage	FT%	Free throw percentage
RPG	Rebounds per game	APG	Assists per game	SPG	Steals per game
BPG	Blocks per game	PPG	Points per game	**Bold**	Career high

=== NBA ===
==== Regular season ====
Year	Team	GP	MPG	FG%	FT%	RPG	APG	PPG
1968–69	Detroit	3	6.0	.222	–	1.0	.7	1.3
