= Elvin Ivory =

American basketball player

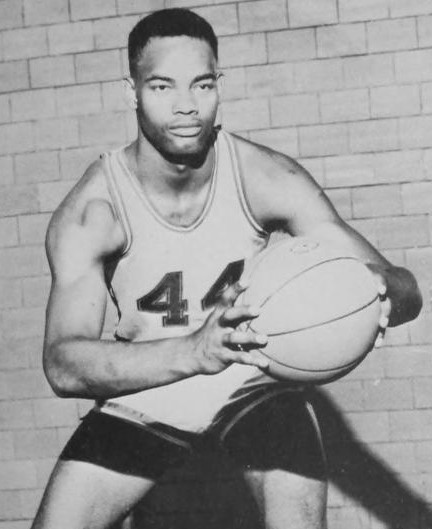

Personal information
- Born: July 2, 1948 (age 78) Birmingham, Alabama
- Listed height: 6 ft 8 in (2.03 m)
- Listed weight: 210 lb (95 kg)

Career information
- High school: Hayes (Birmingham, Alabama)
- College: Louisiana (1966–1968)
- NBA draft: 1968: undrafted
- Position: Forward
- Number: 42

Career history
- 1968–1969: Los Angeles Stars
- Stats at Basketball Reference

Elvin Dennis Ivory (born July 2, 1948) is a retired professional basketball player who spent one season in the American Basketball Association (ABA) as a member of the Los Angeles Stars during the 1968–69 season. Born in Birmingham, Alabama, he attended University of Louisiana at Lafayette.
