= Lee Davis =

American basketball player

Personal information
- Born: October 11, 1945 (age 81) Raleigh, North Carolina
- Listed height: 6 ft 8 in (2.03 m)
- Listed weight: 235 lb (107 kg)

Career information
- High school: Ligon (Raleigh, North Carolina)
- College: North Carolina Central (1964–1968)
- NBA draft: 1968: 10th round, 133rd overall pick
- Drafted by: Phoenix Suns
- Playing career: 1968–1976
- Position: Center / power forward
- Number: 34, 8

Career history
- 1968–1974: New Orleans Buccaneers / Memphis Pros/Tams
- 1974–1975: San Diego Conquistadors / Sails

Career ABA statistics
- Points: 3,511
- Rebounds: 2,195
- Assists: 435
- Stats at Basketball Reference

Lee Ommie Davis (born October 11, 1945) is a retired basketball player who played for eight seasons in the American Basketball Association (ABA). A center and forward during his career, he played for five different ABA teams.

== Early life ==
Davis was born in Raleigh, North Carolina. He also attended Ligon High School in Raleigh. After graduating, he enrolled at North Carolina Central University. In his four years at the college, Davis scored over 1,000 points and averaged over 15 points per game.

== New Orleans Buccaneers ==
In 1968, Davis was selected by the National Basketball Association's Phoenix Suns in the 10th round of the NBA draft. He was also drafted by the American Basketball Association's New Orleans Buccaneers in a separate draft that same year. Davis opted to play for the Bucs, where he became a role player for the Babe McCarthy-coached club. He played sparingly in his first two seasons with the club.

== Memphis Pros and Memphis Tams ==
The Buccaneers moved to Memphis for the 1970–71 season and became the Memphis Pros. Davis remained with the franchise and played for two seasons with the Pros. During the 1970–71 season, he played in twelve minutes per game and averaged six points per game, season bests at the time. His playing time regressed the following season and his numbers dropped accordingly.

The Pros were renamed the Memphis Tams in time for the 1972–73 season, and Babe McCarthy was replaced as head coach by Bob Bass. Under Bass, Davis' playing time increased and his numbers followed suit; he set new season highs by averaging thirteen points per game and eight rebounds per game. His playing time diminished slightly in the 1973–74 season, one which saw Bass be replaced by Butch van Breda Kolff, and he averaged over five fewer points and two-and-a-half rebounds per game fewer than he did the previous year.

== San Diego Conquistadors and San Diego Sails ==
Davis left the Tams as a free agent and went on to join the San Diego Conquistadors for the 1974–75 season. He shot 52.8% from the field in his first season, finishing among the league's top ten in field goal percentage, while averaging nearly twelve points and six-and-a-half rebounds per game.

The following season, the Conquistadors were sold to new ownership, who renamed the team the San Diego Sails. Davis was one of only three players, along with Bo Lamar and Caldwell Jones, who were retained by the Sails for the 1975–76 season. The Sails would only last 11 games before folding; Davis played in only fifty-one minutes in seven games with the Sails. These were the final games of his professional career. He retired having scored over 3,500 points and having grabbed over 2,000 rebounds in his eight-season career.
