= Clarence Brookins =

American basketball player

Personal information
- Born: July 25, 1946 (age 80) Philadelphia, Pennsylvania, U.S.
- Listed height: 6 ft 4 in (1.93 m)
- Listed weight: 190 lb (86 kg)

Career information
- High school: John Bartram; Philadelphia
- College: Temple (1965–1968)
- NBA draft: 1968: 9th round, 118th overall pick
- Drafted by: Philadelphia 76ers
- Playing career: 1970–1971
- Position: Forward
- Number: 12

Career history
- 1970–1971: The Floridians
- Stats at Basketball Reference

Clarence Brookins (born July 25, 1946) is a retired American basketball player.

He played collegiately for the Temple University.

He was selected by the Philadelphia 76ers in the 9th round (118th pick overall) of the 1968 NBA draft.

He played for The Floridians (1970–71) in the ABA for 8 games.
