= Charles Parks (basketball) =

American basketball player

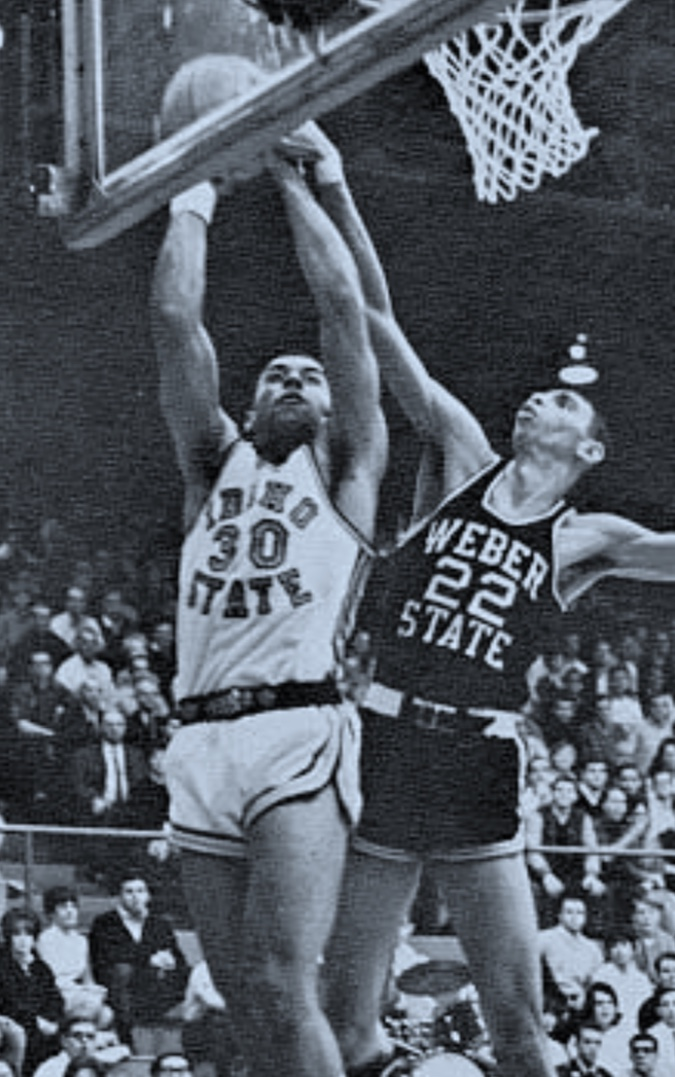
- Parks (left) in college against Weber State (c. 1967)

Personal information
- Born: 1946 (age 79–80)
- Listed height: 6 ft 5 in (1.96 m)
- Listed weight: 210 lb (95 kg)

Career information
- High school: St. Ignatius College Preparatory (San Francisco, California)
- College: CC of San Francisco (1964–1966); Idaho State (1966–1968)
- NBA draft: 1968: 7th round, 92nd overall pick
- Drafted by: Phoenix Suns
- Position: Small forward
- Number: 50

Career history
- 1969: Denver Rockets

Career highlights
- First-team All-Big Sky (1967); Second-team All-Big Sky (1968)
- Stats at Basketball Reference

Charles Parks (born 1946) is an American retired professional basketball player who spent one season in the American Basketball Association (ABA) as a member of the Denver Rockets (1968–69). He went to high school at St. Ignatius College Preparatory in San Francisco, where he was named the city's prep player of the year. Parks attended San Francisco City College before playing college basketball for the Idaho State Bengals. In his first season with the Bengals in 1966–67, he was an all-conference selection in the Big Sky Conference after finishing third in the conference in scoring, averaging 20 points per game. He moved from playing forward to guard in 1967–68, when he was named second-team all-conference. In two seasons at Idaho State, he averaged 18 points and 5.6 rebounds per game. Parks signed with Denver after they drafted him in the tenth round of the 1968 ABA draft. He was also selected in the seventh round of the 1968 NBA draft by the Phoenix Suns.
