= Jasper Wilson (basketball) =

American basketball player

Personal information
- Born: July 12, 1947 (age 79) Camden, Arkansas, U.S.
- Listed height: 6 ft 6 in (1.98 m)
- Listed weight: 200 lb (91 kg)

Career information
- College: Southern (1965–1968)
- NBA draft: 1968: 7th round, 82nd overall pick
- Drafted by: Baltimore Bullets
- Playing career: 1968–1969
- Position: Small forward
- Number: 31

Career history
- 1968–1969: New Orleans Buccaneers
- Stats at Basketball Reference

Jasper Wilson (born July 12, 1947) is an American former professional basketball player.

Wilson was born in Camden, Arkansas and attended Southern University. In his final season at Southern, he scored at least 24 points in every game. Between 1968 and 1969, he played parts of two seasons in the American Basketball Association as a member of the New Orleans Buccaneers. He averaged 5.2 points per game in his ABA career.
