= Mike Butler (basketball) =

American basketball player

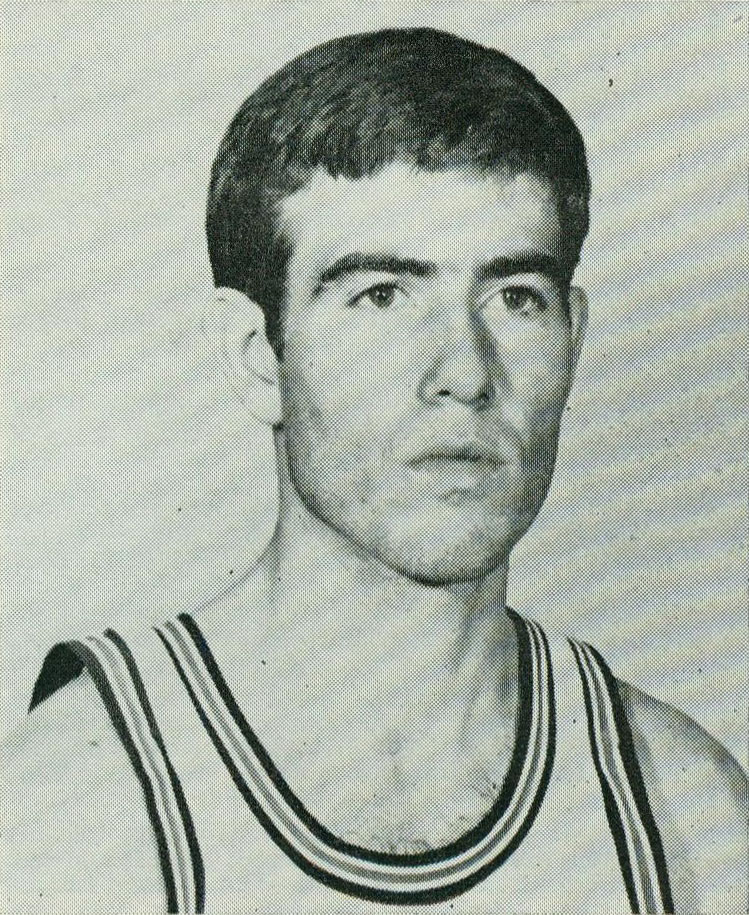

Personal information
- Born: October 22, 1946 Memphis, Tennessee, U.S.
- Died: November 18, 2018 (aged 72)
- Listed height: 6 ft 2 in (1.88 m)
- Listed weight: 170 lb (77 kg)

Career information
- High school: Lindbergh (St. Louis, Missouri); Kingsbury (Memphis, Tennessee)
- College: Memphis (1965–1968)
- NBA draft: 1968: 10th round, 121st overall pick
- Drafted by: San Diego Rockets
- Playing career: 1968–1972
- Position: Shooting guard
- Number: 10, 12

Career history
- 1968–1970: New Orleans Buccaneers
- 1970–1972: Utah Stars

Career highlights
- ABA champion (1971)
- Stats at Basketball Reference

Michael Edward Butler (born October 22, 1946 - November 18, 2018) was an American professional basketball player born in Memphis, Tennessee.

He was selected in the 1968 NBA draft by the San Diego Rockets, and in the 1972 American Basketball Association (ABA) Draft by the San Diego Conquistadors. He played four seasons in the ABA with the New Orleans Buccaneers and the Utah Stars.

After retiring from professional basketball, Butler worked in the transportation and distribution business. He lived in Lakeland, Tennessee.

Butler lived in St. Louis, Missouri for a short period of time (1959–1961) and attended Lindbergh High School. From 1962 to 1964 Mike played for Coach Bill Todd at Memphis Kingsbury High School. In 102 games he set the then Shelby Metro Area Record by scoring 1,976 points.
