= Jim Kissane =

American basketball player

Personal information
- Born: August 17, 1946 (age 80) New Hyde Park, New York, U.S.
- Listed height: 6 ft 7 in (2.01 m)
- Listed weight: 210 lb (95 kg)

Career information
- High school: Chaminade (Mineola, New York)
- College: Boston College (1965–1968)
- NBA draft: 1968: 5th round, 55th overall pick
- Drafted by: Cincinnati Royals
- Position: Forward
- Number: 13

Career history
- 1968: Minnesota Pipers
- Stats at Basketball Reference

James J. Kissane Jr. (born August 17, 1946) is an American former professional basketball player. He played in the American Basketball Association for the Minnesota Pipers in just two games during the 1968–69 season. He scored six points and grabbed three rebounds total.

As a player at Boston College, Kissane's squads made the National Invitation Tournament once and NCAA Tournament twice in the three varsity seasons in which he was eligible to play.
