= Brian Brunkhorst =

American basketball player (born 1945)

Personal information
- Born: June 12, 1945 (age 81) Owen, Wisconsin, U.S.
- Listed height: 6 ft 6 in (1.98 m)
- Listed weight: 208 lb (94 kg)

Career information
- High school: Dor-Abby (Abbotsford, Wisconsin)
- College: Marquette (1964–1968)
- NBA draft: 1968: 6th round, 72nd overall pick
- Drafted by: New York Knicks
- Position: Forward
- Number: 32

Career history
- 1968: Los Angeles Stars
- Stats at Basketball Reference

Brian J. "Bronk" Brunkhorst (born June 12, 1945) is an American former basketball player.

== Career ==
Born in Owen, Wisconsin, Brunkhorst played collegiately for the Marquette University. He was selected by the New York Knicks in the 6th round (72nd pick overall) of the 1968 NBA draft. Eventually, he played for the Los Angeles Stars (1968–69) in the ABA for three games.
