= Thad Jaracz =

American basketball player

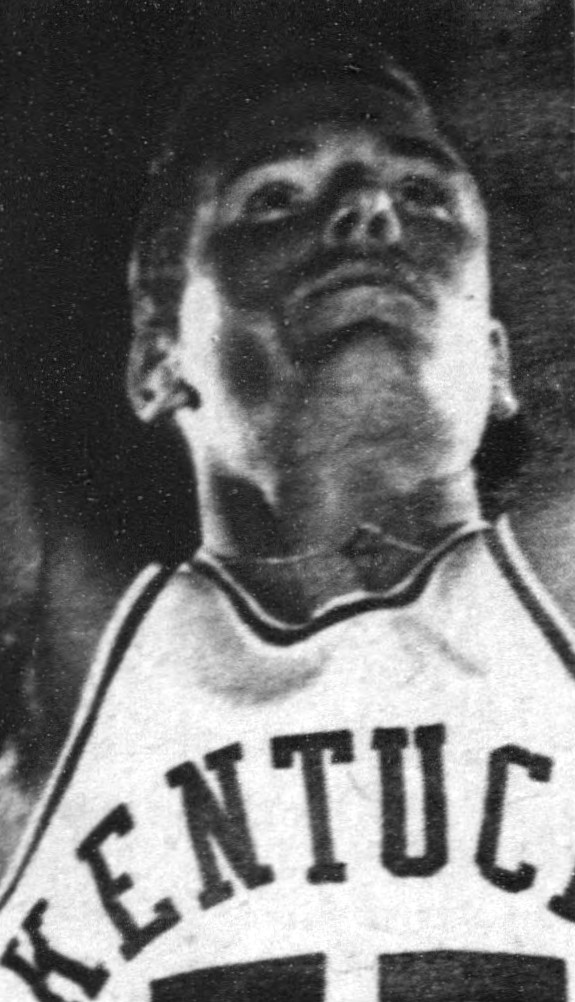
- Jaracz, circa 1967

Personal information
- Born: December 15, 1946 (age 79) Lexington, Kentucky
- Listed height: 6 ft 5 in (1.96 m)
- Listed weight: 230 lb (104 kg)

Career information
- High school: Lafayette (Lexington, Kentucky)
- College: Kentucky (1965–1968)
- NBA draft: 1968: 5th round, 60th overall pick
- Drafted by: Boston Celtics
- Position: Center / power forward
- Number: 55

Career highlights
- Third-team All-American – AP (1966)
- Stats at Basketball Reference

Thad Jaracz (born December 15, 1946) is an American former basketball player, best known for his All-American college career at the University of Kentucky.

Jaracz came to UK from Lexington, Kentucky's Lafayette High School. A 6'5" center, Jaracz anchored the middle as a sophomore for Adolph Rupp's undersized "Rupp's Runts" in 1965–66. Jaracz was the team's third-leading scorer, averaging 13.2 points per game as the Wildcats made it to the 1966 NCAA championship game, where they famously lost to the Texas Western Miners, the first team to win a title with five black starters. At the close of the season, Jaracz joined teammates Louie Dampier and Pat Riley on the Associated Press All-American team, earning third team honors.

Following the close of his college career in 1968, Jaracz was drafted both by the Boston Celtics of the National Basketball Association and the Kentucky Colonels of the American Basketball Association. However, he never played in either league. Instead, he entered into a military career, eventually overseeing the ROTC at the University of Louisville.
