= Ed Johnson (basketball) =

American basketball player (1944–2016)

Personal information
- Born: June 17, 1944 Atlanta, Georgia
- Died: April 5, 2016 (aged 71)
- Listed height: 6 ft 8 in (2.03 m)
- Listed weight: 205 lb (93 kg)

Career information
- High school: David T. Howard (Atlanta, Georgia)
- College: Tennessee State (1964–1967)
- NBA draft: 1968: 3rd round, 34th overall pick
- Drafted by: Seattle SuperSonics
- Playing career: 1968–1980
- Position: Center
- Number: 50, 20, 32
- Coaching career: 1984–2000

Career history

Playing
- 1968–1969: Los Angeles Stars
- 1969–1971: New York Nets
- 1971: Texas Chaparrals
- 1972–1973: Hartford Capitols
- 1973–1974: Manresa
- 1974–1975: Bagnolet
- 1975–1977: Manresa
- 1977–1978: Joventut Badalona
- 1978–1979: Mollet
- 1979–1980: Joventut Badalona

Coaching
- 1984–1985 1988–1989 1991: Gijón Baloncesto
- 1998–2000: Gijón Baloncesto (assistant)

Career highlights
- EBA Most Valuable Player (1973); All-EBA First Team (1973)
- Stats at Basketball Reference

Ed Lee Johnson (June 17, 1944 – April 5, 2016) was an American professional basketball player. After a collegiate career at Tennessee State University, Johnson was selected in both the 1968 ABA draft and 1968 NBA draft.

In a career that spanned 12 seasons, Johnson played in the original American Basketball Association, Continental Basketball Association, and some of the top leagues in Spain and France. He was named the most valuable player of the Eastern Basketball Association (EBA) and a member of the All-EBA First Team in 1973.

== Reactions to his death ==
On 2 May 2016, the Town Hall of Gijón, where he lived during 27 years, renamed in his honour the central court of the Municipal Palacio de Deportes.

== Personal life ==
Johnson was married to Isabel Argüelles and had two daughters with her. One of their daughters, Allison Audrey, played college basketball at Georgia State University, where she was named the Sun Belt Newcomer of the Year as well as being named to the Third Team All-Sun Belt. Allison Audrey is also in a relationship with NBA player Jaden McDaniels, and the couple had their first child, a son named Mekhi, in June 2024.
