= Mickey McCarty =

American football player (1946–2010)

No. 81, 88
- Position: Tight end

Personal information
- Born: November 15, 1946; Jonesboro, Arkansas, U.S.
- Died: July 21, 2010 (aged 63); Houston, Texas, U.S.
- Listed height: 6 ft 5 in (1.96 m)
- Listed weight: 255 lb (116 kg)

Career information
- High school: Pasadena (Pasadena, Texas)
- College: TCU (1967)
- NFL draft: 1968: 4th round, 90th overall pick

Career history
- Kansas City Chiefs (1969); Chicago Fire (1974); Detroit Wheels (1974)

Awards and highlights
- Super Bowl champion (IV); AFL champion (1969)
- Stats at Pro Football Reference

Mickey McCarty (November 15, 1946 – July 21, 2010) was an American professional football player who was a tight end for one season for the Kansas City Chiefs. McCarty was also drafted by the Chicago Bulls of the NBA (15th round, 183rd overall pick in the 1968 draft), the MLB's Cleveland Indians (25th round of the 1968 draft), and the Dallas Chaparrals of the ABA, but decided to play with the Chiefs in the American Football League, who drafted him in the fourth round with the 90th pick in the 1968 NFL/AFL draft.
