= John Smith (basketball, born 1944) =

American basketball player

Personal information
- Born: May 24, 1944 (age 82) Columbus, Mississippi, U.S.
- Listed height: 7 ft 0 in (2.13 m)
- Listed weight: 235 lb (107 kg)

Career information
- College: CSU–Pueblo (1964–1968)
- NBA draft: 1968: 8th round, 101st overall pick
- Drafted by: Los Angeles Lakers
- Playing career: 1968–1970
- Position: Center
- Number: 55, 21, 10

Career history
- 1968–1970: Dallas Chaparrals
- 1970: Pittsburgh Pipers
- 1970: Wilkes-Barre Barons
- 1970: New York Nets
- Stats at Basketball Reference

John Smith Jr. (born May 24, 1944) is an American former professional basketball player. After a collegiate career at the University of Southern Colorado (now Colorado State University–Pueblo), the 7'0" center was drafted by the Los Angeles Lakers in the 1968 NBA draft as the 101st overall pick. He was also selected in the 1968 American Basketball Association (ABA) draft by the Dallas Chaparrals. His professional career lasted for two seasons, including three teams in the ABA and one in the Continental Basketball Association.
