= Mack Daughtry =

American basketball player (1946–2024)

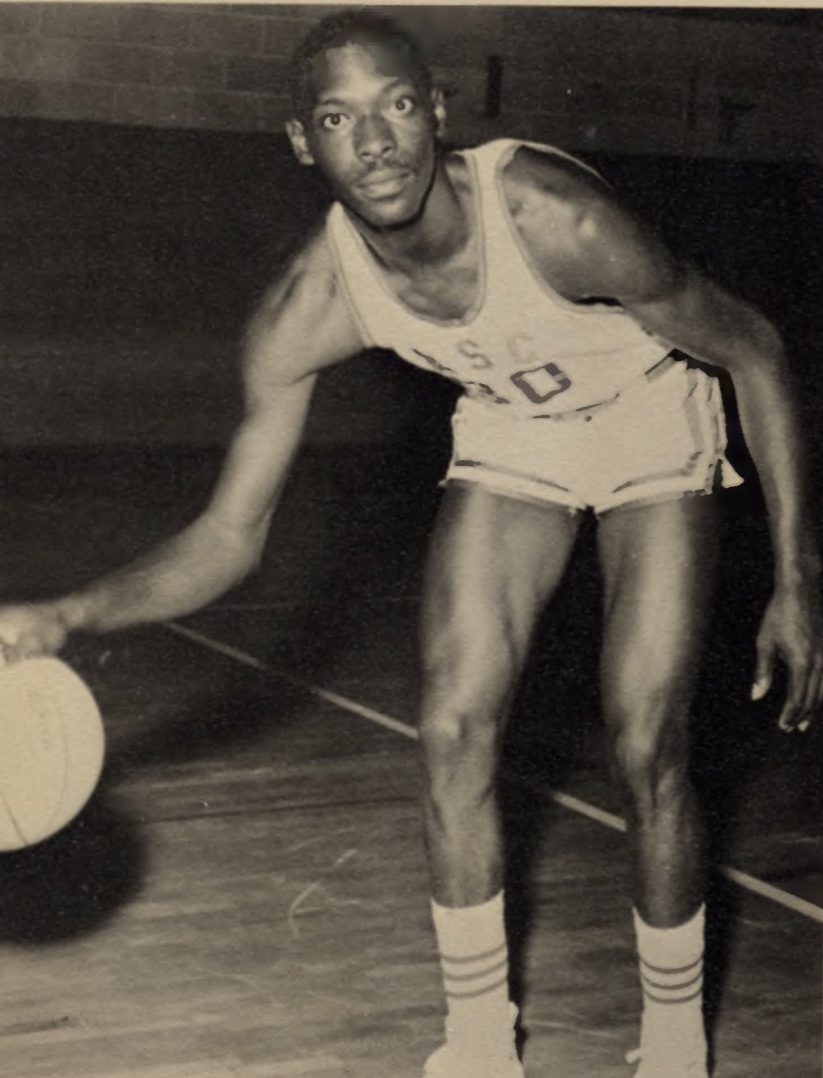
- Daughtry at Albany State in 1968

Personal information
- Born: July 20, 1946 Enigma, Georgia, U.S.
- Died: November 2, 2024 (aged 78) Hazle Township, Pennsylvania, U.S.
- Listed height: 6 ft 3 in (1.91 m)
- Listed weight: 175 lb (79 kg)

Career information
- High school: Nashville (Nashville, Georgia)
- College: Albany State (1965–1968)
- NBA draft: 1968: 9th round, 117th overall pick
- Drafted by: Atlanta Hawks
- Playing career: 1968–1981
- Position: Guard
- Number: 34

Career history
- 1968–1973: Wilkes-Barre Barons
- 1970: Carolina Cougars
- 1974–1977: Scranton Apollos
- 1977–1980: Wilkes-Barre / Pennsylvania Barons
- 1980–1981: Scranton Aces

Career highlights
- 4× EPBL/EBA champion (1969, 1973, 1977, 1978); All-EBA Second Team (1975)
- Stats at Basketball Reference

Mack Daughtry Jr. (July 20, 1946 – November 2, 2024) was an American professional basketball player who spent one season in the American Basketball Association (ABA) with the Carolina Cougars during the 1970–71 season. He attended Albany State University. He was drafted by the Atlanta Hawks in the eighth round of the 1968 NBA draft.

Daughtry grew up in Enigma, Georgia, and attended college at Albany State.

Daughtry played in the Eastern Professional Basketball League (EPBL) / Eastern Basketball Association (EBA) / Continental Basketball Association (CBA) for the Wilkes-Barre / Pennsylvania Barons, Scranton Apollos and Scranton Aces from 1968 to 1981. He won EPBL/EBA championships with the Barons in 1969 and 1973, the Apollos in 1977 and the Barons in 1978. Daughtry was selected to the All-EBA Second Team in 1975.

Following his basketball career, which included stints with the Harlem Globetrotters, he settled into a life of community involvement in the Wyoming Valley. Daughtry died at his home in Hazle Township, Pennsylvania, on November 2, 2024, at the age of 78.
