= 1968 NBA draft =

Basketball player selection

General information
- Sport: Basketball
- Dates: April 3, 1968 (first round); May 8 and 10, 1968 (Other rounds)
- Location: New York City, New York

Overview
- 214 total selections in 21 rounds
- League: NBA
- First selection: Elvin Hayes, San Diego Rockets
- Hall of Famers: 2: F Elvin Hayes; F Wes Unseld

The 1968 NBA draft was the 22nd annual draft of the National Basketball Association (NBA). The draft was held on April 3, 1968, and May 8 and 10, 1968, before the 1968–69 season. In this draft, 14 NBA teams took turns selecting amateur U.S. college basketball players. A player who had finished his four-year college eligibility was eligible for selection. If a player left college early, he would not be eligible for selection until his college class graduated. The first two picks in the draft belonged to the teams that finished last in each division, with the order determined by a coin flip. The San Diego Rockets won the coin flip and were awarded the first overall pick, while the Baltimore Bullets were awarded the second pick. The remaining first-round picks and the subsequent rounds were assigned to teams in reverse order of their win–loss record in the previous season. Six teams that had the best records in previous season were not awarded second round draft picks. Two expansion franchises, the Milwaukee Bucks and the Phoenix Suns, took part in the NBA Draft for the first time and were assigned the seventh and eighth pick in the first round, along with the last two picks of each subsequent round. The St. Louis Hawks relocated to Atlanta and became the Atlanta Hawks prior to the start of the season. The draft consisted of 21 rounds comprising 214 players selected. It would also be a catalyst for the upstart rivaling American Basketball Association to either force an antitrust lawsuit against the NBA due to a leaked document that was sent to the ABA by a disgruntled ex-employee revealing the NBA's plans to show how much each team was to contribute to get the college star players to sign with the NBA teams over the ABA teams or engage in a merger between the two leagues, which eventually resulted in the NBA–ABA merger happening years later.

== Draft selections and draftee career notes ==
Elvin Hayes from the University of Houston was selected first overall by the San Diego Rockets. Wes Unseld from the University of Louisville was selected second by the Baltimore Bullets. He went on to win the Rookie of the Year Award and the Most Valuable Player Award in his first season, becoming only the second player to win both awards in the same season, after Wilt Chamberlain in 1960. Hayes and Unseld have been inducted to the Basketball Hall of Fame. They were also named in the 50 Greatest Players in NBA History list announced at the league's 50th anniversary in 1996. Hayes and Unseld both won the NBA championship with the Washington Bullets in 1978. In the Finals, Unseld was named as the Finals Most Valuable Player. Unseld, who spent all of his 13-year playing career with the Bullets, was also selected to one All-NBA Team and five All-Star Games, while Hayes was selected to six All-NBA Teams and twelve All-Star Games. Bob Kauffman, the third pick, is the only other player from this draft who has been selected to an All-Star Game; he was selected to three All-Star Games during his career.

Unseld became a head coach after ending his playing career. He coached the Washington Bullets for seven seasons. Three other players drafted also went on to have a coaching career: 12th pick Don Chaney and 79th pick Rick Adelman. Chaney coached four NBA teams and won the Coach of the Year Award in 1991 with the Houston Rockets. Adelman coached four NBA teams, most recently with the Houston Rockets. He lost the NBA Finals twice with the Portland Trail Blazers in 1990 and 1992.

In the fourteenth round, the Seattle SuperSonics selected Mike Warren of UCLA. However, Warren never played professional basketball; he opted for an acting career in films and television instead.

== Key ==
Pos.	G	F	C
Position	Guard	Forward	Center

^	Denotes player who has been inducted to the Naismith Memorial Basketball Hall of Fame
^{+}	Denotes player who has been selected for at least one All-Star Game
^{#}	Denotes player who has never appeared in an NBA regular-season or playoff game
^{~}	Denotes player who has been selected as Rookie of the Year

== Draft ==
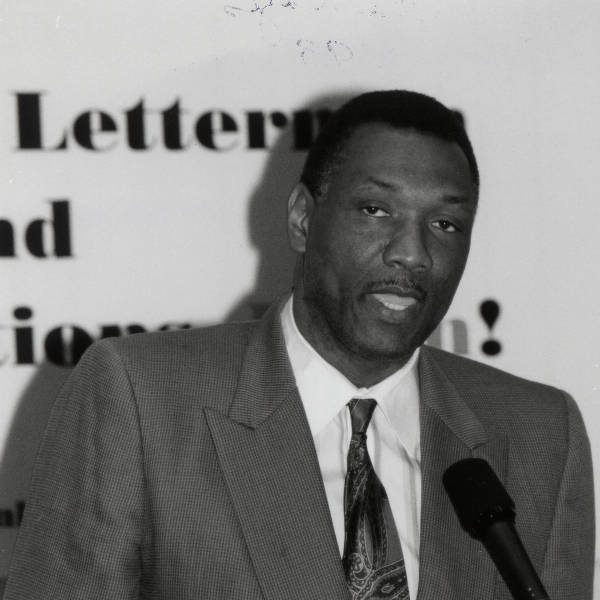
Elvin Hayes was selected first overall by the San Diego Rockets.

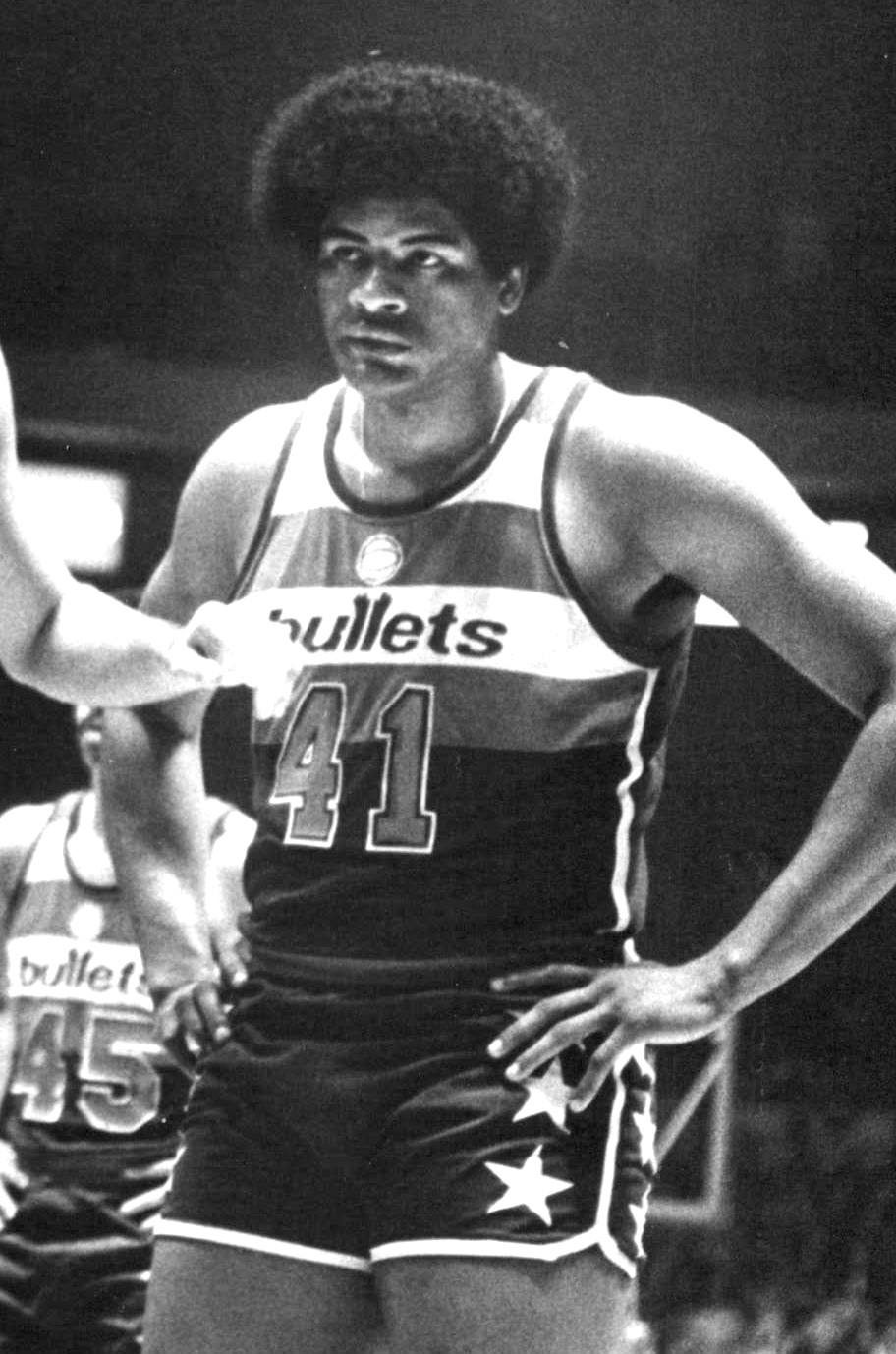
Wes Unseld was selected second overall by the Baltimore Bullets.

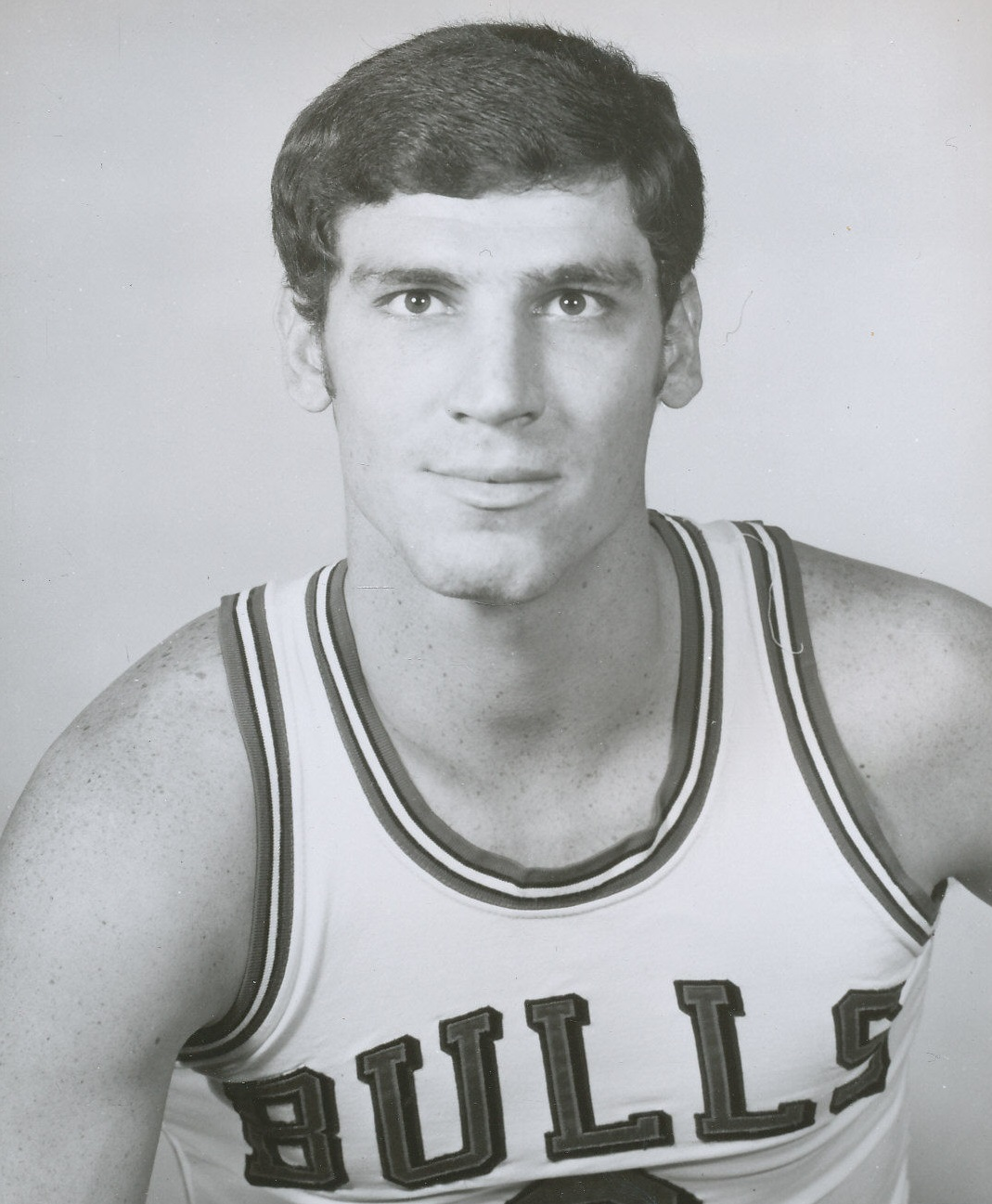
Bob Kauffman was selected third overall by the Seattle SuperSonics.

Rnd.	Pick	Player	Pos.	Nationality (Note: Nationality indicates the player's national team or representative nationality. If a player has not competed at the international level, then the nationality indicates the national team which the player is eligible to represent according to FIBA rules.)	Team	School / club team
1	1	Elvin Hayes^	F/C	United States	San Diego Rockets	Houston (Sr.)
1	2	Wes Unseld^^{~}	F/C	United States	Baltimore Bullets	Louisville (Sr.)
1	3	Bob Kauffman^{+}	F/C	United States	Seattle SuperSonics	Guilford (Sr.)
1	4	Tom Boerwinkle	C	United States	Chicago Bulls	Tennessee (Sr.)
1	5	Don Smith	F/C	United States	Cincinnati Royals	Iowa State (Sr.)
1	6	Otto Moore	F/C	United States	Detroit Pistons	Pan American (Sr.)
1	7	Charlie Paulk	F/C	United States	Milwaukee Bucks	Northeastern State (Sr.)
1	8	Gary Gregor	F/C	United States	Phoenix Suns	South Carolina (Sr.)
1	9	Ron Williams	G	United States	San Francisco Warriors	West Virginia (Sr.)
1	10	Bill Hosket	F/C	United States	New York Knicks	Ohio State (Sr.)
1	11	Bill Hewitt	F	United States	Los Angeles Lakers	USC (Sr.)
1	12	Don Chaney	G	United States	Boston Celtics	Houston (Sr.)
1	13	Skip Harlicka	G	United States	Atlanta Hawks	South Carolina (Sr.)
1	14	Shaler Halimon	G/F	United States	Philadelphia 76ers	Utah State (Sr.)
2	15	John Trapp	F	United States	San Diego Rockets	Nevada Southern (Sr.)
2	16	Art Harris	G	United States	Seattle SuperSonics	Stanford (Sr.)
2	17	Loy Petersen	G	United States	Chicago Bulls	Oregon State (Sr.)
2	18	Bob Quick	G/F	United States	Baltimore Bullets	Xavier (Ohio) (Sr.)
2	19	Ron Dunlap^{#}	C	United States	Chicago Bulls (from Cincinnati)^{[a]}	Illinois (Sr.)
2	20	Manny Leaks	F/C	United States	Detroit Pistons	Niagara (Sr.)
2	21	Dick Cunningham	C	United States	Phoenix Suns	Murray State (Sr.)
2	22	Gene Moore^{#}	F/C	United States	Milwaukee Bucks	Saint Louis (Sr.)
3	23	Stu Lantz	G	United States	San Diego Rockets	Nebraska (Sr.)
3	24	Jeff Ockel^{#}	C	United States	Seattle SuperSonics	Utah (Sr.)
3	25	Don Dee^{#}	F	United States	Detroit Pistons	St. Mary of the Plains (Sr.)
3	26	Ron Nelson^{#}	G	United States	Baltimore Bullets	New Mexico (Sr.)
3	27	Pat Frink	G	United States	Cincinnati Royals	Colorado (Sr.)
3	28	Fred Foster	F	United States	Cincinnati Royals (from Detroit)^{[b]}	Miami (Ohio) (Sr.)
3	29	Don Sidle^{#}	F/C	United States	San Francisco Warriors	Oklahoma (Sr.)
3	30	Don May	F	United States	New York Knicks	Dayton (Sr.)
3	31	Dave Newmark	C	United States	Chicago Bulls (from Los Angeles)^{[c]}	Columbia (Sr.)
3	32	Garfield Smith	F/C	United States	Boston Celtics	Eastern Kentucky (Sr.)
3	33	Jack Thompson^{#}	G	United States	Baltimore Bullets	South Carolina (Sr.)
3	34	Ed Johnson^{#}	C	United States	Seattle SuperSonics	Tennessee State (Sr.)
3	35	Sam Williams	G	United States	Milwaukee Bucks	Iowa (Sr.)
3	36	Art Beatty^{#}	C	United States	Phoenix Suns	American (Sr.)
4	37	Harry Barnes	F	United States	San Diego Rockets	Northeastern (Sr.)
4	38	Henry Logan^{#}	G	United States	Seattle SuperSonics	Western Carolina (Sr.)
4	39	Mike Lynn	F	United States	Chicago Bulls	UCLA (Sr.)
4	40	Dallas Thornton^{#}	F	United States	Baltimore Bullets	Kentucky Wesleyan (Sr.)
4	41	Dan Sparks^{#}	F	United States	Cincinnati Royals	Weber State (Sr.)
4	42	Rich Niemann	C	United States	Detroit Pistons	Saint Louis (Sr.)
4	43	Edgar Lacy^{#}	F	United States	San Francisco Warriors	UCLA (Sr.)
4	44	Warren Jabali^{#}	G	United States	New York Knicks	Wichita State (Sr.)
4	45	Ed Biedenbach	G	United States	Los Angeles Lakers	North Carolina State (Sr.)
4	46	Rich Johnson	C	United States	Boston Celtics	Grambling (Sr.)
4	47	Bob Warren^{#}	G	United States	Atlanta Hawks	Vanderbilt (Sr.)
4	48	Darryl Jones^{#}	F	United States	San Diego Rockets	Benedictine (Sr.)
4	49	Rich Jones	F/C	United States	Phoenix Suns	Memphis State (Sr.)
4	50	Greg Smith	F	United States	Milwaukee Bucks	Western Kentucky (Sr.)
5	51	Glen Combs^{#}	G	United States	San Diego Rockets	Virginia Tech (Sr.)
5	52	Al Hairston	G	United States	Seattle SuperSonics	Bowling Green (Sr.)
5	53	Jim Tillman^{#}	F	United States	Chicago Bulls	Loyola Chicago (Sr.)
5	54	Theodore Chaplin^{#}	F	United States	Baltimore Bullets	Voorhees (Sr.)
5	55	Jim Kissane^{#}	F	United States	Cincinnati Royals	Boston College (Sr.)
5	56	Carl Fuller^{#}	C	United States	Detroit Pistons	Bethune–Cookman (Sr.)
5	57	Jim Eakins	C	United States	San Francisco Warriors	Brigham Young (Sr.)
5	58	Butch Booker^{#}	C	United States	New York Knicks	Cheyney (Jr.)
5	59	Lou Shephard^{#}	F	United States	Los Angeles Lakers	Missouri State (Sr.)
5	60	Thad Jaracz^{#}	F	United States	Boston Celtics	Kentucky (Sr.)
5	61	Rusty Parker^{#}	F	United States	Atlanta Hawks	Miami (Florida) (Sr.)
5	62	Larry Miller^{#}	G	United States	Philadelphia 76ers	North Carolina (Sr.)
5	63	Joe Franklin^{#}	F	United States	Milwaukee Bucks	Wisconsin (Sr.)
5	64	Harry Hollines^{#}	G	United States	Phoenix Suns	Denver (Sr.)
6	65	Eldridge Webb^{#}	G	United States	San Diego Rockets	Tulsa (Sr.)
6	66	Ron Guziak^{#}	F	United States	Seattle SuperSonics	Duquesne (Sr.)
6	67	Kenn Barnett^{#}	C	United States	Chicago Bulls	Delaware (Sr.)
6	68	Joe Heiser^{#}	G	United States	Baltimore Bullets	Princeton (Sr.)
6	69	Calvin Martin^{#}	F	United States	Cincinnati Royals	Texas Southern (Sr.)
6	70	Wally Anderzunas	F/C	United States	Detroit Pistons	Creighton (Jr.)
6	71	Bob Allen	F	United States	San Francisco Warriors	Marshall (Sr.)
6	72	Brian Brunkhorst^{#}	F	United States	New York Knicks	Marquette (Sr.)
6	73	Nick Pino^{#}	C	United States	Los Angeles Lakers	Kansas State (Sr.)
6	74	Jerry Newsom^{#}	F	United States	Boston Celtics	Indiana State (Sr.)
6	75	Phil Wagner^{#}	G	United States	Atlanta Hawks	Georgia Tech (Sr.)
6	76	Chuck Williams	G	United States	Philadelphia 76ers	Colorado (Sr.)
6	77	Rod Knowles	F/C	United States	Phoenix Suns	Davidson (Sr.)
6	78	Fred Smith^{#}	G	United States	Milwaukee Bucks	Hawaii (Sr.)
7	79	Rick Adelman^	G	United States	San Diego Rockets	Loyola (California) (Sr.)
7	80	Jim McKean^{#}	C	United States	Seattle SuperSonics	Washington State (Sr.)
7	81	Willie Davis^{#}	C	United States	Chicago Bulls	North Texas (Sr.)
7	82	Jasper Wilson^{#}	F	United States	Baltimore Bullets	Southern (Sr.)
7	83	Rich Dumas^{#}	G	United States	Cincinnati Royals	Northeastern State (Sr.)
7	84	Larry Newbold^{#}	G	United States	Detroit Pistons	LIU (Sr.)
7	85	Dave Reaser^{#}	F	United States	San Francisco Warriors	West Virginia (Sr.)
7	86	Bob Waldal^{#}	F	United States	New York Knicks	Dickinson State (Sr.)
7	87	Dennis Hrcka^{#}	F	United States	Los Angeles Lakers	Hillsdale (Sr.)
7	88	Mike Lewis^{#}	C	United States	Boston Celtics	Duke (Sr.)
7	89	Oscar Smith^{#}	F	United States	Atlanta Hawks	Elizabeth City State (Sr.)
7	90	Bill Jones^{#}	G	United States	Philadelphia 76ers	Fairfield (Sr.)
7	91	Tom Kondla^{#}	C	United States	Milwaukee Bucks	Minnesota (Sr.)
7	92	Charles Parks^{#}	F	United States	Phoenix Suns	Idaho State (Sr.)
8	93	Aaron Sellers^{#}	F	United States	San Diego Rockets	Jackson State (Sr.)
8	94	Willie Rogers^{#}	G	United States	Seattle SuperSonics	Oklahoma (Sr.)
8	95	Lloyd Higgins^{#}	F	United States	Chicago Bulls	Pasadena (Sr.)
8	96	Barry Orms	G	United States	Baltimore Bullets	Saint Louis (Sr.)
8	97	Dave Williams^{#}	C	United States	Cincinnati Royals	Mississippi State (Sr.)
8	98	Harry Laurie^{#}	G	United States	Detroit Pistons	Saint Peter's (Sr.)
8	99	Walt Piatkowski^{#}	F	United States	San Francisco Warriors	Bowling Green (Sr.)
8	100	Bobby Hooper^{#}	G	United States	New York Knicks	Dayton (Sr.)
8	101	John Smith^{#}	C	United States	Los Angeles Lakers	Southern Colorado State (Sr.)
8	102	Julius Keye^{#}	F/C	United States	Boston Celtics	Alcorn A&M (Jr.)
8	103	Marty Baietti^{#}	G	United States	Atlanta Hawks	Manhattan (Sr.)
8	104	Melvin Jones^{#}	F	United States	Philadelphia 76ers	Albany State (Sr.)
8	105	Brian Clare^{#}	G	United States	Phoenix Suns	Denver (Sr.)
8	106	Elburt Miller^{#}	F	United States	Milwaukee Bucks	UNLV (Sr.)
9	107	John Schetzsle^{#}	F	United States	San Diego Rockets	Ashland (Sr.)
9	108	Jimmy Smith^{#}	G	United States	Seattle SuperSonics	Utah State (Sr.)
9	109	Corky Bell^{#}	F	United States	Chicago Bulls	Loyola Chicago (Sr.)
9	110	Wayne Chapman^{#}	F	United States	Baltimore Bullets	Western Kentucky (Sr.)
9	111	Butch Joyner^{#}	F	United States	Cincinnati Royals	Indiana (Sr.)
9	112	Vaughn Harper^{#}	F	United States	Detroit Pistons	Syracuse (Sr.)
9	113	Art Wilmore^{#}	G	United States	San Francisco Warriors	San Francisco (Sr.)
9	114	Rodger Bohnenstiehl^{#}	F	United States	New York Knicks	Kansas (Sr.)
9	115	George Stone^{#}	F	United States	Los Angeles Lakers	Marshall (Sr.)
9	116	Bill Butler^{#}	G	United States	Boston Celtics	St. Bonaventure (Sr.)
9	117	Mack Daughtry^{#}	G	United States	Atlanta Hawks	Albany State (Sr.)
9	118	Clarence Brookins^{#}	F	United States	Philadelphia 76ers	Temple (Sr.)
9	119	Cliff Berger^{#}	C	United States	Milwaukee Bucks	Kentucky (Sr.)
9	120	Mervin Jackson^{#}	G	United States	Phoenix Suns	Utah (Sr.)
9	121	Mike Butler^{#}	G	United States	San Diego Rockets	Memphis (Sr.)
10	122	Joe Kennedy	F	United States	Seattle SuperSonics	Duke (Sr.)
10	123	Mike Weaver^{#}	F	United States	Chicago Bulls	Northwestern (Sr.)
10	124	Steve Adelman^{#}	F	United States	Baltimore Bullets	Boston College (Sr.)
10	125	Bob Wyenandt^{#}	F	United States	Cincinnati Royals	Vanderbilt (Sr.)
10	126	Tom Baack^{#}	F	United States	Detroit Pistons	Nebraska (Sr.)
10	127	Bob Heaney^{#}	F	United States	San Francisco Warriors	Santa Clara (Sr.)
10	128	Sylvester Adams^{#}	G	United States	New York Knicks	North Carolina A&T (Sr.)
10	129	Charles Alford^{#}	F	United States	Los Angeles Lakers	East Carolina (Sr.)
10	130	Ivan Leshinsky^{#}	F	United States	Boston Celtics	LIU (Sr.)
10	131	Dwight Waller	F	United States	Atlanta Hawks	Tennessee State Huntsmen (AAU)
10	132	Greg Cisson^{#}	F	United States	Philadelphia 76ers	Rider (Sr.)
10	133	Lee Davis^{#}	F/C	United States	Phoenix Suns	North Carolina Central (Sr.)
10	134	Eugene Jones^{#}	C	United States	Milwaukee Bucks	Missouri (Sr.)
11	135	Leonidas Epps^{#}	F	United States	San Diego Rockets	Clark Atlanta (Sr.)
11	136	Jim Marsh	F	United States	Seattle SuperSonics	USC (Sr.)
11	137	Jim McGonigle^{#}	G	United States	Chicago Bulls	Iowa State (Sr.)
11	138	Al Dixon^{#}	C	United States	Baltimore Bullets	Bowling Green (Sr.)
11	139	James Robinson^{#}	G	United States	Cincinnati Royals	RIT (Sr.)
11	140	Jerry Chandler^{#}	G	United States	San Francisco Warriors	UNLV (Sr.)
11	141	Bob Redd^{#}	G	United States	New York Knicks	Marshall (Sr.)
11	142	Harry Singletary^{#}	F	United States	Los Angeles Lakers	Florida Presbyterian (Sr.)
11	143	Tom Niemeier^{#}	F	United States	Boston Celtics	Evansville (Sr.)
11	144	Henry Watkins^{#}	F	United States	Atlanta Hawks	Tennessee State Huntsmen (AAU)
11	145	Bill Soens^{#}	F	United States	Philadelphia 76ers	Miami (Florida) (Sr.)
11	146	Brad Luchini^{#}	G	United States	Milwaukee Bucks	Marquette (Sr.)
11	147	Ron Boone	G/F	United States	Phoenix Suns	Idaho State (Sr.)
12	148	Roy Manning^{#}	F	United States	San Diego Rockets	Lane (Sr.)
12	149	Walt Simon^{#}	G	United States	Seattle SuperSonics	Utah (Sr.)
12	150	John Lallensack^{#}	F	United States	Chicago Bulls	Wisconsin–Oshkosh (Sr.)
12	151	Willie Cager^{#}	F	United States	Baltimore Bullets	UTEP (Sr.)
12	152	Glynn Saulters^{#}	G	United States	Cincinnati Royals	Northeast Louisiana State (Sr.)
12	153	Bob Wolfe^{#}	F	United States	San Francisco Warriors	California (Sr.)
12	154	Pat Moriarty^{#}	F	United States	New York Knicks	Guilford (Sr.)
12	155	Reggie Lacefield^{#}	G/F	United States	Los Angeles Lakers	Western Michigan (Sr.)
12	156	Bill Langheld^{#}	F	United States	Boston Celtics	Fordham (Sr.)
12	157	Phil Harris^{#}	C	United States	Atlanta Hawks	UTEP (Sr.)
12	158	Ted Campbell^{#}	F	United States	Philadelphia 76ers	North Carolina A&T (Sr.)
12	159	Dave Miller^{#}	F	United States	Milwaukee Bucks	Florida (Sr.)
12	160	Bill Davis^{#}	F	United States	Phoenix Suns	Arizona (Sr.)
13	161	Marshall Evans^{#}	F	United States	San Diego Rockets	Lincoln (Missouri) (Sr.)
13	162	Bud Ogden	F	United States	Seattle SuperSonics	Santa Clara (Jr.)
13	163	Herm Gilliam	G/F	United States	Chicago Bulls	Purdue (Jr.)
13	164	Rudy Bogad^{#}	F	United States	Baltimore Bullets	St. John's (Sr.)
13	165	Billy Tindall^{#}	F	United States	Cincinnati Royals	UMass (Sr.)
13	166	Ken Morehead^{#}	F	United States	New York Knicks	Hillsdale (Sr.)
13	167	Harvey Munford^{#}	F	United States	Los Angeles Lakers	Elks Club (AAU)
13	168	Art Stephenson^{#}	F	United States	Boston Celtics	Rhode Island (Sr.)
13	169	Frank Standard^{#}	G	United States	Atlanta Hawks	South Carolina (Sr.)
13	170	Earl Seyfert^{#}	F	United States	Philadelphia 76ers	Kansas State (Sr.)
13	171	Pat Hobart^{#}	F	United States	Phoenix Suns	California State (Sr.)
14	172	Bobby Lewis^{#}	G	United States	San Diego Rockets	South Carolina State (Sr.)
14	173	Michael Warren^{#}	G	United States	Seattle SuperSonics	UCLA (Sr.)
14	174	Dave Carr^{#}	G	United States	Chicago Bulls	Washington (Sr.)
14	175	Ernest Sims^{#}	C	United States	Baltimore Bullets	East Tennessee State (Sr.)
14	176	Charles Core^{#}	F	United States	Cincinnati Royals	Southeastern Louisiana (Sr.)
14	177	John Haarlow^{#}	F	United States	New York Knicks	Princeton (Sr.)
14	178	John Ray Godfrey^{#}	G	United States	Los Angeles Lakers	Abilene Christian (Sr.)
14	179	Keith Hochstein^{#}	G	United States	Boston Celtics	Holy Cross (Sr.)
14	180	George Hicker^{#}	G	United States	Atlanta Hawks	Syracuse (Sr.)
14	181	Tom Youngdale^{#}	F	United States	Philadelphia 76ers	Davidson (Sr.)
15	182	Bill Gaines^{#}	G	United States	San Diego Rockets	East Texas State (Sr.)
15	183	Mickey McCarty^{#}	F	United States	Chicago Bulls	TCU (Sr.)
15	184	Joe Allen^{#}	F	United States	Baltimore Bullets	Bradley (Sr.)
15	185	Mike Drespling^{#}	G	United States	Cincinnati Royals	Westminster College (Pennsylvania) (Sr.)
15	186	Ed Fellers^{#}	F	United States	New York Knicks	Guilford (Sr.)
15	187	Johnny Baum	F	United States	Los Angeles Lakers	Temple (Jr.)
15	188	Bennie Foster^{#}	F	United States	Atlanta Hawks	Pasadena (Sr.)
15	189	George Mack^{#}	G	United States	Philadelphia 76ers	North Carolina A&T (Sr.)
16	190	Chuck Caldwell^{#}	G	United States	San Diego Rockets	UMSL (Sr.)
16	191	Fred Holden^{#}	G	United States	Chicago Bulls	Louisville (Sr.)
16	192	Dennis Black^{#}	F	United States	Baltimore Bullets	San Francisco (Sr.)
16	193	Dick Harris^{#}	F	United States	Cincinnati Royals	Manchester (Sr.)
16	194	Bob Ferguson^{#}	F	United States	New York Knicks	Tennessee Wesleyan (Sr.)
16	195	Mike Eberle^{#}	G	United States	Los Angeles Lakers	Wyoming (Sr.)
16	196	Terry Allerton^{#}	F	United States	Atlanta Hawks	Baldwin–Wallace (Sr.)
16	197	Joe Crews^{#}	G	United States	Philadelphia 76ers	Villanova (Sr.)
17	198	Tom Billars^{#}	F	United States	San Diego Rockets	Dakota Wesleyan (Sr.)
17	199	Dave Benedict^{#}	G	United States	Chicago Bulls	Central Washington State (Sr.)
17	200	Gregg Morris^{#}	G	United States	Baltimore Bullets	Cornell (Sr.)
17	201	John Howard^{#}	F	United States	Cincinnati Royals	Cincinnati (Sr.)
17	202	Milt Williams	G	United States	New York Knicks	Lincoln (Missouri) (Sr.)
17	203	Nate Ware^{#}	G	United States	Philadelphia 76ers	Tennessee State (Sr.)
18	204	Harold Grant^{#}	F	United States	San Diego Rockets	Pepperdine (Sr.)
18	205	Bob Zoretich^{#}	F	United States	Chicago Bulls	DePaul (Sr.)
18	206	Art Kenney^{#}	F	United States	Baltimore Bullets	Fairfield (Sr.)
18	207	Larry Humes^{#}	G	United States	Cincinnati Royals	Evansville (Sr.)
19	208	Bill Corley^{#}	F	United States	San Diego Rockets	UConn (Sr.)
19	209	Rich Mason^{#}	F	United States	Chicago Bulls	Indiana State (Sr.)
19	210	Jim LaCour^{#}	F	United States	Baltimore Bullets	Seattle (Sr.)
19	211	Ray Jeffords^{#}	F	United States	Cincinnati Royals	Georgia (Sr.)
20	212	Pee Wee Kirkland^{#}	G	United States	Chicago Bulls	Norfolk State (Jr.)
20	213	Ron Woodruff^{#}	C	United States	Baltimore Bullets	Midwestern (Sr.)
21	214	Ronald Horton^{#}	F	United States	Chicago Bulls	Delaware State (Sr.)

== Notable undrafted player ==
This player was not selected in the 1968 draft but played at least one game in the NBA.

Player	Pos.	Nationality	School/club team
Cliff Williams	SG	United States	Bowling Green (Sr.)

== Trades ==
- ^{a} On October 20, 1967, the Chicago Bulls acquired Flynn Robinson, 1968 and 1969 second-round picks from the Cincinnati Royals in exchange for Guy Rodgers. The Bulls used the pick to draft Ron Dunlap.
- ^{b} On November 27, 1967, the Cincinnati Royals acquired a third-round pick from the Detroit Pistons in exchange for Len Chappell. The Royals used the pick to draft Fred Foster.
- ^{c} On January 9, 1968, the Chicago Bulls acquired Jim Barnes and a third-round pick from the Los Angeles Lakers in exchange for Erwin Mueller. The Bulls used the pick to draft Dave Newmark.

== Notes ==
1: Don Smith changed his name to Zaid Abdul-Aziz in 1976.

== See also ==
- List of first overall NBA draft picks
