= Butch Booker =

American basketball player (born 1945)

Personal information
- Born: July 20, 1945 (age 81)
- Listed height: 6 ft 10 in (2.08 m)
- Listed weight: 230 lb (104 kg)

Career information
- High school: Colwyn (Darby, Pennsylvania)
- College: Cheyney (1965–1969)
- NBA draft: 1969: 4th round, 46th overall pick
- Drafted by: Seattle SuperSonics
- Playing career: 1969–1971
- Position: Center
- Number: 41

Career history
- 1969–1970: Miami Floridians
- 1970–1971: Binghamton Flyers / Trenton Pat Pavers

Career highlights
- Second-team Parade All-American (1964)
- Stats at Basketball Reference

Harold "Butch" Booker, also known as Hal Booker (born July 20, 1945) is a retired American basketball player.

He played collegiately for the Cheyney University of Pennsylvania. He was drafted by both the New York Knicks (5th round) and the Seattle SuperSonics (4th round) in the 1968 and 1969 editions of the NBA draft, respectively, but never played for either team.

He played for the Miami Floridians (1969–70) in the ABA for 12 games.

Booker played 10 games for the Binghamton Flyers / Trenton Pat Pavers in the Eastern Basketball Association (EBA) during the 1970–71 season.
