= North Carolina Central Eagles men's basketball =

2026–27 North Carolina Central Eagles men's basketball team
- University: North Carolina Central University
- Head coach: LeVelle Moton (17th season)
- Location: Durham, North Carolina
- Arena: McDougald–McLendon Arena (capacity: 3,056)
- Conference: MEAC
- Nickname: Eagles
- Colors: Maroon and gray

NCAA Division I tournament champions
- 1989*
Other NCAA Division I tournament results
Final Four	1989*
Elite Eight	1989*, 1993*
Sweet Sixteen	1989*, 1993*
Appearances	1957*, 1988*, 1989*, 1990*, 1993*, 1996*, 1997*, 2014, 2017, 2018, 2019

Conference tournament champions
- 1946, 1950* (CIAA); 2014, 2017, 2018, 2019 (MEAC)

Conference regular-season champions
- 2014, 2015, 2017, 2020 (MEAC)
- * at Division II level

The North Carolina Central Eagles men's basketball team is the basketball team that represents North Carolina Central University, which is located in Durham, North Carolina, United States. The team currently competes in the Mid-Eastern Athletic Conference.

Prior to 2011, the Eagles competed in NCAA Division II and won the 1989 NCAA Men's Division II Basketball Championship. For much of the university's tenure in Division II, the school (formerly "North Carolina College") was a member of the Central Intercollegiate Athletic Association. The Eagles have appeared four times in the NCAA tournament, most recently in 2019.

== Eagles in the NBA ==
NBA & ABA players who attended North Carolina Central:

- Lee Davis - Selected in the 10th round by the Phoenix Suns in the 1968 NBA draft.
- Sam Jones - Selected 8th overall by the Boston Celtics in the 1957 NBA draft.
- David Young - Selected in the 2nd round by the Seattle SuperSonics in the 2004 NBA draft.

== Eagles in international basketball ==
- Stanton Kidd (born 1992), basketball player for Hapoel Jerusalem in the Israeli Basketball Premier League

== Eagles in the Hall of Fame ==
Two Eagles have been selected to the Naismith Memorial Basketball Hall of Fame:

- Sam Jones - former NCCU player - inducted as a player in 1984.
- John McClendon - former NCCU coach - inducted as a contributor in 1979, and as a coach in 2016.

== Postseason ==
=== NCAA Division I tournament results ===
The Eagles have appeared in the NCAA Division I Tournament four times. Their combined record is 0–4.

Year	Round	Opponent	Result
2014	First Round	Iowa State	L 75–93
2017	First Four	UC Davis	L 63–67
2018	First Four	Texas Southern	L 46–64
2019	First Four	North Dakota State	L 74–78

=== NIT results ===
The Eagles have appeared in the National Invitation Tournament (NIT) one time. Their record is 0–1.

Year	Round	Opponent	Result
2015	First round	Miami (FL)	L 71–75

=== NCAA Division II tournament results ===
The Eagles have appeared in the NCAA Division II Tournament seven times. Their combined record is 10–6. They were Division II National Champions in 1989.

Year	Round	Opponent	Result
1957	Regional semifinals Regional Finals	Florida A&M; Mount St. Mary's	W 78–61; L 88–106
1988	Regional semifinals Regional Finals	Virginia State; Troy State	W 56–49; L 65–66 ^{OT}
1989	Regional semifinals Regional Finals; Elite Eight; Final Four; National Championship Game	Norfolk State; Virginia Union; Sacred Heart; Jacksonville State; Southeast Missouri State	W 67–64; W 60–55; W 58–57; W 90–70; W 73–46
1990	Regional semifinals Regional Finals	Tampa; Jacksonville State	W 66–61; L 88–95 ^{OT}
1993	Regional semifinals Regional Finals; Elite Eight	Alabama A&M; Virginia Union; Cal State Bakersfield	W 93–84; W 93–81; L 80–86
1996	First round	Pfeiffer	L 62–71
1997	Regional semifinals	Saint Augustine's	L 66–78
