= Carl Fuller =

American basketball player (born 1946)

Personal information
- Born: January 10, 1946 (age 80) St. Augustine, Florida, U.S.
- Listed height: 6 ft 9 in (2.06 m)
- Listed weight: 225 lb (102 kg)

Career information
- High school: Murray (St. Augustine, Florida)
- College: Bethune–Cookman (1963–1968)
- NBA draft: 1968: 5th round, 56th overall pick
- Drafted by: Detroit Pistons
- Playing career: 1969–1972
- Position: Center
- Number: 51

Career history
- 1969–1970: Allentown Jets
- 1970–1972: The Floridians

Career highlights
- EPBL champion (1970)
- Stats at Basketball Reference

Carl Edmond Fuller (born January 10, 1946, in St. Augustine, Florida) is an American former professional basketball center who played two seasons in the American Basketball Association (ABA) as a member of The Floridians in the 1970–71 and 1971–72 seasons. He attended Bethune-Cookman University where during the fifth round of the 1968 NBA draft, he was selected by the Detroit Pistons, and during the ninth round of the 1967 NBA draft, he was also selected by the St. Louis Hawks, but never played in the NBA.

Fuller played for the Allentown Jets of the Eastern Professional Basketball League (EPBL) during the 1969–70 season and won an EPBL championship in 1970.
