= Harry Laurie =

American basketball player (born 1944)

Personal information
- Born: November 2, 1944 (age 82)
- Listed height: 6 ft 1 in (1.85 m)
- Listed weight: 178 lb (81 kg)

Career information
- High school: Lincoln (Jersey City, New Jersey)
- College: Saint Peter's (1966–1968)
- NBA draft: 1968: 8th round, 98th overall pick
- Drafted by: Detroit Pistons
- Playing career: 1969–1974
- Position: Point guard

Career history
- 1969–1971: Allentown Jets
- 1971: Pittsburgh Condors
- 1971–1972: Trenton Pat Pavers
- 1972–1974: Garden State / East Orange Colonials

Career highlights
- EPBL champion (1970)
- Stats at Basketball Reference

Harry Laurie (born November 2, 1944) is an American former professional basketball player who spent one season in the American Basketball Association (ABA) as a member of the Pittsburgh Condors during the 1970–71 season. He attended St Peter's College where he was drafted in the eighth round (98^{th} overall pick) of the 1968 NBA draft by the Detroit Pistons, but he never played for them.

Laurie played in the Eastern Professional Basketball League (EPBL) / Eastern Basketball Association (EBA) for the Allentown Jets, Trenton Pat Pavers and Garden State / East Orange Colonials from 1969 to 1974. He won an EPBL championship with the Jets in 1970.
