= John Thompson =

John Thompson may refer to:

== Academics ==
- J. A. Thompson (1913–2002), Australian biblical scholar
- John D. Thompson (1917–1992), nurse and professor at the Yale School of Public Health
- John G. Thompson (born 1932), American mathematician
- John Thompson (business academic) (fl. 1990s–2010s), professor of Entrepreneurship, University of Huddersfield
- John Thompson (sociologist), professor at Cambridge
- John Herd Thompson (1946–2019), Canadian historian
- John N. Thompson (born 1951), American evolutionary biologist

== Business ==
- John Thompson (American banker) (1802–1891)
- John Fairfield Thompson (1881–1968), chairman of Inco
- John L. Thompson (1869–1930), Iowa journalist and businessman
- John Philp Thompson Sr. (1925–2003), American businessman with 7-Eleven
- John Thompson (Canadian banker) (born 1942), non-executive chairman of the board of Toronto-Dominion Bank
- John W. Thompson (born 1949), chairman of the board of Microsoft
- John Thompson (company), based in Wolverhampton

== Entertainment ==
- John Thompson (actor) (died 1634), member of the King's Men in the 1621–1631 era
- John Thompson (engraver) (1785–1866), English wood engraver
- John Reuben Thompson (1823–1873), American poet, journalist, editor and publisher
- John Edward Thompson (1882–1945), American artist
- John Sylvanus Thompson (1889–1963), American pianist
- John Thompson (Australian poet) (1907–1968), Australian poet and broadcaster
- J. Lee Thompson (1914–2002), English film director, screenwriter, and producer
- John Thompson (writer, born 1918) (1918–2002), American poet, critic, professor
- Johnny Thompson (1934–2019), Las Vegas illusionist
- John Thompson (Canadian poet) (1938–1976)
- John Cargill Thompson (1938–2000), Scottish dramatist
- John Douglas Thompson (born 1964), actor
- John Dall (John Dall Thompson, 1920–1971), American actor
- John Thompson Productions, a German pornographic film studio established in 1997
  - John Thompson (producer) (born 1945), producer and director of John Thompson Productions

== Military ==
- John Thompson (Royal Navy officer) (1776–1864), British navy officer
- John Thompson (soldier, born 1838) (1838–1915), American Civil War soldier and Medal of Honor recipient
- John Thompson (soldier, born 1842) (1842–?), American Indian Wars soldier and Medal of Honor recipient
- John T. Thompson (1860–1940), inventor of the Thompson submachine gun
- John Marlow Thompson (1914–1994), British Second World War Ace and Battle of Britain pilot
- John Thompson (RAF officer) (1947–2023), former Royal Air Force officer
- John F. Thompson (general) (fl. 1980s–2020s), U.S. Air Force general

== Politics ==
=== United States ===
- John Thompson (Louisiana judge) (died 1810), registrar of lands and judge
- John C. Thompson (1790–1831), Vermont lawyer, politician, and judge
- John H. Thompson (politician), Lieutenant Governor of Indiana, 1824–1828
- John Thompson (1749–1823), US congressman from New York
- John Thompson (1809–1890), US congressman from New York
- John Burton Thompson (1810–1874), Whig politician from Kentucky
- John Martin Thompson (1829–1907), lumberman and civic leader
- John McCandless Thompson (1829–1903), US congressman from Pennsylvania
- John R. Thompson (1834–1894), founder of the Grange
- John E. W. Thompson (1860–1918), American diplomat
- John F. Thompson (politician) (1920–1965), Massachusetts state Speaker of the House
- John D. Thompson Jr. (1928–1986), member of the Ohio House of Representatives
- John Thompson (Minnesota politician), member of the Minnesota House of Representatives
- John Thomson (Ohio politician) (1780–1852), also Thompson, U.S. congressman from Ohio, member of the Ohio Senate and House of Representatives
- John W. Thompson (Iowa politician) (1823–1883), member of the Iowa House of Representatives, Iowa Senate, and mayor of Davenport, Iowa

=== Canada ===
- John Hall Thompson (1810–1893), Canadian court commissioner and political figure
- Sir John Sparrow David Thompson (1845–1894), prime minister of Canada
- J. Enoch Thompson (1846–1932), Canadian politician, diplomat, writer, and businessman
- John W. Thompson (Manitoba politician) (1858–1914), politician in Manitoba
- John Thompson (Manitoba politician) (1908–1986), Manitoba provincial cabinet minister
- John Thompson (Alberta politician) (1924–2016), Alberta provincial politician

=== United Kingdom ===
- John Thompson, 1st Baron Haversham (c. 1648–1710), English politician
- John Thompson (politician, born 1861) (1861–1959), British member of parliament for East Somerset, 1906–1910
- Jack Thompson (politician) (John Thompson, 1928–2011), British Labour MP for Wansbeck
- John Thomson (diplomat) (1927–2018), British ambassador to Angola

=== Other people in politics ===
- John Malbon Thompson (1830–1908), Australian politician, MLA for Queensland

== Science ==
- John Vaughan Thompson (1779–1847), British biologist
- John Hannay Thompson (1869–c. 1940), British harbour engineer
- John McLean Thompson (1888–1977), Scottish botanist
- Sir J. Eric S. Thompson (John Eric Sidney Thompson, 1898–1975), English archeologist and Mayan scholar
- John Edd Thompson (1942/1943–2025), American meteorologist

== Sports ==
=== American football ===
- John Thompson (American football coach) (born 1955), former defensive coordinator for the Ole Miss football team
- John Thompson (American football executive) (1927–2022)
- John Thompson (tight end) (born 1957)

=== Association football ===
- John Thompson (footballer, born 1888) (1888–1984), English footballer for Sunderland
- Ernie Thompson (footballer, born 1909) (John Ernest Thompson, 1909–1985), Manchester United F.C. player in the 1930s
- John Thompson (footballer, born 1932) (1932–2006), English football goalkeeper who played for Newcastle United and Lincoln City
- John Thompson (footballer, born 1981), Irish professional footballer

=== Australian football ===
- John Thompson (Australian footballer, born 1903) (1903–1985), Australian rules footballer for North Melbourne
- John Thompson (Australian footballer, born 1938) (1938–1999), Australian rules footballer for Richmond

=== Baseball ===
- Jocko Thompson (John Samuel Thompson, 1917–1988), Major League Baseball pitcher
- Tug Thompson (John Parkinson Thompson, 1856–1938), Major League Baseball outfielder

=== Basketball ===
- John Thompson (basketball) (1941–2020), American basketball player and Hall of Fame coach at Georgetown University
- John Thompson III (born 1966), his son, also former basketball coach at Georgetown
- Cat Thompson (John Ashworth Thompson, 1906–1990), American basketball player

=== Cricket ===
- John Thompson (cricketer, born 1870) (1870–1945), English cricketer
- John Thompson (cricketer, born 1918) (1918–2010), English cricketer
- Johnny Thompson (cricketer) (born 1983), Irish cricketer
- Jock Thompson (cricketer) (John de Lisle Thompson, 1904–1978), cricketer for Rhodesia

=== Rugby ===
- John Thompson (rugby union, born 1886) (c. 1886–c. 1978), rugby union player who represented Australia
- John Thompson (rugby union, born 1898) (1898–1951), rugby union player who represented Ireland
- John Thompson (rugby league) (born 1959), footballer of the 1970s, 1980s and 1990s

=== Other sports ===
- John Garcia Thompson (born 1979), British beach volleyball player
- John Thompson (boxer) (born 1989), professional boxer
- Jock Thompson (bowls) (John Dawson Hedley Thompson, 1920–2000), Scottish-born Welsh international lawn bowler

== Other people ==
- John Thompson (priest) (died 1571), Canon of Windsor
- John Lester Thompson, American Californian bishop
- John Thompson (journalist) (1928–2017), British journalist
- John Thompson (landscape architect) (1941–2015), British landscape architect for the city of Oxford
- Jack Thompson (activist) (John Bruce Thompson, born 1951), Florida lawyer
- John H. Thompson (statistician) (1951–2025), American statistician, Census Director
- John Thompson (convict), convict of the colony of New South Wales
- John Thompson (inventor) (born 1959), inventor of the Lingo programming language
- John Thompson (mass murderer) (1938–2008), Scottish-born arsonist responsible for the Denmark Place fire
- Sir John Thompson (judge) (1907–1995), British barrister and judge
- John Rosolu Bankole Thompson (1936–2021), Sierra Leonean judge and jurist
- Sir John Perronet Thompson (1873–1935), British administrator in India
- Snowshoe Thompson (John Albert Thompson, 1827–1876), mail carrier across the Sierras
- John Thompson, exonerated death row inmate, party in 2011 US Supreme Court case Connick v. Thompson

== See also ==
- Jon Thompson (disambiguation)
- John Thomson (disambiguation)
- Jack Thompson (disambiguation)
- Jonathan Thompson (disambiguation)
- Thompson (disambiguation)
