= Indiana Pacers all-time roster =

List of players of the Indiana Pacers NBA franchise

The following is a list of players, both past and current, who appeared at least in one game for the Indiana Pacers NBA franchise.

== Players ==
This list is composed of players who played at least one ABA or NBA game for the Pacers franchise. Note: Statistics are correct through the end of the 2025–26 season.

G	Guard	G/F	Guard-forward	F	Forward	F/C	Forward-center	C	Center

legend
^	Denotes player who has been inducted to the Naismith Memorial Basketball Hall of Fame
*	Denotes player who has been selected for at least one All-Star Game with the Indiana Pacers and is currently on the team roster
^{+}	Denotes player who has been selected for at least one All-Star Game with the Indiana Pacers
^{x}	Denotes player who is currently on the Indiana Pacers roster
0.0	Denotes the Indiana Pacers statistics leader (min. 100 games played for the team for per-game statistics)
player	Denotes player who has played for the Indiana Pacers in the ABA

=== A to B ===
All-time roster
Player	Pos.	Pre-draft team	Yrs	Seasons	Statistics									Ref.
Player	Pos.	Pre-draft team	Yrs	Seasons	GP	MP	REB	AST	PTS	MPG	RPG	APG	PPG	Ref.
Tom Abernethy	F	Indiana	1	1980–1981	29	259	40	18	59	8.9	1.4	0.6	2.0	
Matt Aitch	F	Michigan State	1	1967–1968	45	637	160	18	252	14.2	3.6	0.4	5.6	
Jerome Allen	G	Penn	1	1996–1997	51	692	65	109	164	13.6	1.3	2.1	3.2	
Lavoy Allen	F/C	Temple	4	2013–2017	217	3,652	1,000	212	960	16.8	4.6	1.0	4.4	
Lou Amundson	F/C	UNLV	1	2011–2012	60	753	222	14	213	12.6	3.7	0.2	3.6	
Jerome Anderson	G	West Virginia	1	1976–1977	27	164	12	10	66	6.1	0.4	0.4	2.4	
Justin Anderson	G/F	Virginia	1	2021–2022	13	269	40	27	89	20.7	3.1	2.1	6.8	
Kenny Anderson	G	Georgia Tech	1	2003–2004	44	905	81	125	262	20.6	1.8	2.8	6.0	
Ron Anderson	G/F	Fresno State	3	1985–1988	197	3,287	615	268	1,526	16.7	3.1	1.4	7.7	
Ike Anigbogu	F/C	UCLA	2	2017–2019	14	36	12	1	13	2.6	0.9	0.1	0.9	
Darrell Armstrong	G	Fayetteville State	1	2006–2007	81	1,275	135	191	457	15.7	1.7	2.4	5.6	
Bob Arnzen	F	Notre Dame	2	1972–1974	43	260	43	6	102	6.0	1.0	0.1	2.4	
Ron Artest^{+}	F	St. John's	5	2001–2006	193	6,744	1,010	577	3,189	34.9	5.2	3.0	16.5	
Vincent Askew	G/F	Memphis	1	1996–1997	41	822	98	90	233	20.0	2.4	2.2	5.7	
D. J. Augustin	G	Texas	1	2012–2013	76	1,226	91	170	356	16.1	1.2	2.2	4.7	
Mike Bantom	F/C	Saint Joseph's	5	1977–1982	355	11,045	2,357	1,048	4,876	31.1	6.6	3.0	13.7	
Leandro Barbosa	G	(Brazil) Bauru	1	2011–2012	22	436	49	33	196	19.8	2.2	1.5	8.9	
Nate Barnett	G	Akron	1	1975–1976	12	73	8	8	27	6.1	0.7	0.7	2.3	
John Barnhill	G	Tennessee State	3	1969–1972	139	3,187	254	411	1,163	22.9	1.8	3.0	8.4	
Maceo Baston	F	Michigan	2	2006–2007; 2008–2009	74	622	126	23	205	8.4	1.7	0.3	2.8	
Johnny Baum	F	Temple	1	1973–1974	13	113	25	2	36	8.7	1.9	0.2	2.8	
Arthur Becker	F	Arizona State	2	1969–1971	133	2,344	596	67	1,169	17.6	4.5	0.5	8.8	
Ron Behagen	F/C	Minnesota	1	1977–1978	51	1,131	333	65	572	22.2	6.5	1.3	11.2	
Jonathan Bender	F	Picayune Memorial HS (MS)	7	1999–2006	237	3,555	530	154	1,335	15.0	2.2	0.6	5.6	
Mel Bennett	F	Pittsburgh	2	1976–1978	98	1,196	330	92	388	12.2	3.4	0.9	4.0	
Travis Best	G	Georgia Tech	7	1995–2002	469	10,327	846	1,785	3,809	22.0	1.8	3.8	8.1	
Goga Bitadze	C	(Serbia) Mega	4	2019–2023	170	1,963	482	133	821	11.5	2.8	0.8	4.8	
Bojan Bogdanović	G/F	(Croatia) Cibona	2	2017–2019	161	5,037	603	280	2,595	31.3	3.7	1.7	16.1	
Etdrick Bohannon	F	Auburn Montgomery	1	1997–1998	5	11	6	1	0	2.2	1.2	0.2	0.0	
Ron Bonham	F	Cincinnati	1	1967–1968	42	426	57	14	245	10.1	1.4	0.3	5.8	
Trevor Booker	F	Clemson	1	2017–2018	17	269	77	17	91	15.8	4.5	1.0	5.4	
Brian Bowen	G/F	La Lumiere (IN)	2	2019–2021	12	46	10	0	9	3.8	0.8	0.0	0.8	
Dudley Bradley	G/F	North Carolina	2	1979–1981	164	3,894	416	440	1,345	23.7	2.5	2.7	8.2	
Tony Bradley	C	North Carolina	2	2024–2026	52	529	149	26	212	10.2	2.9	0.5	4.1	
Brad Branson	F/C	SMU	1	1982–1983	62	680	173	46	338	11.0	2.8	0.7	5.5	
Jamison Brewer	G	Auburn	3	2001–2004	36	283	28	44	58	7.9	0.8	1.2	1.6	
Primož Brezec	C	(Slovenia) Union Olimpija	3	2001–2004	62	343	66	13	113	5.5	1.1	0.2	1.8	
Amida Brimah	C	UConn	1	2020–2021	5	29	8	1	13	5.8	1.6	0.2	2.6	
Oshae Brissett	F	Syracuse	3	2020–2023	153	3,166	691	134	1,240	20.7	4.5	0.9	8.1	
Malcolm Brogdon	G	Virginia	3	2019–2022	146	4,802	741	922	2,766	32.9	5.1	6.3	18.9	
Aaron Brooks	G	Oregon	1	2016–2017	65	894	69	125	322	13.8	1.1	1.9	5.0	
Michael Brooks	F	La Salle	1	1986–1987	10	148	28	11	33	14.8	2.8	1.1	3.3	
Bruce Brown	G/F	Miami (FL)	1	2023–2024	33	981	154	100	398	29.7	4.7	3.0	12.1	
Kendall Brown	G/F	Baylor	2	2022–2024	21	103	11	8	30	4.9	0.5	0.4	1.4	
Kobe Brown^{x}	F	Missouri	1	2025–2026	27	668	132	53	253	24.7	4.9	2.0	9.4	
Moses Brown	C	UCLA	1	2024–2025	9	46	13	0	29	5.1	1.4	0.0	3.2	
Roger Brown^ (#35)	G/F	Dayton	8	1967–1975	559	20,315	3,609	2,214	10,058	36.3	6.5	4.0	18.0	
Tony Brown	G/F	Arkansas	1	1984–1985	82	1,586	288	159	544	19.3	3.5	1.9	6.6	
Thomas Bryant	C	Indiana	1	2024–2025	56	848	219	49	388	15.1	3.9	0.9	6.9	
Quinn Buckner	G	Indiana	1	1985–1986	32	419	51	86	117	13.1	1.6	2.7	3.7	
Chase Budinger	F	Arizona	1	2015–2016	49	729	121	49	216	14.9	2.5	1.0	4.4	
Don Buse^{+}	G	Evansville	7	1972–1977; 1980–1982	539	15,681	1,635	2,737	4,145	29.1	3.0	5.1	7.7	
Rasual Butler	G/F	La Salle	1	2013–2014	50	378	41	17	136	7.6	0.8	0.3	2.7	
Andrew Bynum	C	St. Joseph HS (NJ)	1	2013–2014	2	36	19	2	23	18.0	9.5	1.0	11.5	
Marty Byrnes	F	Syracuse	1	1982–1983	80	1,436	191	179	391	18.0	2.4	2.2	4.9	

=== C to D ===
All-time roster
Player	Pos.	Pre-draft team	Yrs	Seasons	Statistics									Ref.
Player	Pos.	Pre-draft team	Yrs	Seasons	GP	MP	REB	AST	PTS	MPG	RPG	APG	PPG	Ref.
Adrian Caldwell	F/C	Lamar	1	1995–1996	51	327	110	6	110	6.4	2.2	0.1	2.2	
Corky Calhoun	F	Penn	2	1978–1980	88	1,362	248	104	386	15.5	2.8	1.2	4.4	
Larry Cannon	G	La Salle	2	1971–1972; 1973–1974	31	504	36	75	193	16.3	1.2	2.4	6.2	
Bob Carrington	G/F	Boston College	1	1977–1978	35	621	62	62	250	17.7	1.8	1.8	7.1	
Butch Carter	G	Indiana	3	1981–1984	229	4,796	382	460	2,268	20.9	1.7	2.0	9.9	
Ron Carter	G	VMI	1	1979–1980	13	117	19	9	32	9.0	1.5	0.7	2.5	
Ahmad Caver	G	Old Dominion	1	2021–2022	1	1	0	0	2	1.0	0.0	0.0	2.0	
Wayne Chapman	G/F	Western Kentucky	2	1970–1972	29	268	36	32	106	9.2	1.2	1.1	3.7	
Phil Chenier	G	California	1	1979–1980	23	380	35	47	124	16.5	1.5	2.0	5.4	
Rakeem Christmas	F	Syracuse	2	2015–2017	30	225	57	4	63	7.5	1.9	0.1	2.1	
Steve Chubin	G	Rhode Island	2	1968–1970	56	1,106	136	194	466	19.8	2.4	3.5	8.3	
Darren Collison	G	UCLA	4	2010–2012; 2017–2019	284	8,399	822	1,517	3,368	29.6	2.9	5.3	11.9	
Leroy Combs	F	Oklahoma State	1	1983–1984	48	446	56	38	218	9.3	1.2	0.8	4.5	
Lester Conner	G	Oregon State	1	1993–1994	11	169	24	31	31	15.4	2.2	2.8	2.8	
Chris Copeland	F	Colorado	2	2013–2015	91	1,093	143	69	462	12.0	1.6	0.8	5.1	
Torrey Craig	F	USC Upstate	1	2021–2022	51	1,034	195	58	329	20.3	3.8	1.1	6.5	
Austin Croshere	F	Providence	9	1997–2006	540	10,196	2,325	544	4,035	18.9	4.3	1.0	7.5	
Michael Curry	G/F	Georgia Southern	1	2004–2005	18	249	27	15	30	13.8	1.5	0.8	1.7	
Erick Dampier	C	Mississippi State	1	1996–1997	72	1,052	294	43	370	14.6	4.1	0.6	5.1	
Marquis Daniels	G/F	Auburn	3	2006–2009	173	4,046	542	308	1,659	23.4	3.1	1.8	9.6	
Mel Daniels^ (#34)	C	New Mexico	6	1968–1974	479	17,756	7,643	900	9,314	37.1	16.0	1.9	19.4	
Adrian Dantley^	G/F	Notre Dame	1	1977–1978	23	948	216	65	609	41.2	9.4	2.8	26.5	
Ollie Darden	F/C	Michigan	2	1967–1968; 1969–1970	103	2,333	617	82	1,033	22.7	6.0	0.8	10.0	
Antonio Davis	F/C	UTEP	6	1993–1999	420	10,651	2,788	282	3,786	25.4	6.6	0.7	9.0	
Brad Davis	G	Maryland	2	1978–1980	27	276	18	48	66	10.2	0.7	1.8	2.4	
Dale Davis^{+}	F/C	Clemson	10	1991–2000; 2004–2005	671	19,814	6,006	572	6,253	29.5	9.0	0.9	9.3	
Johnny Davis	G	Dayton	4	1978–1982	319	11,083	765	1,719	5,234	34.7	2.4	5.4	16.4	
Jimmy Dawson	G	Illinois	1	1967–1968	21	288	21	32	118	13.7	1.0	1.5	5.6	
Don Dee	F	St. Mary of the Plains	1	1968–1969	58	989	292	33	332	17.1	5.0	0.6	5.7	
RayJ Dennis	G	Baylor	2	2024–2026	24	238	33	40	94	9.9	1.4	1.7	3.9	
Travis Diener	G	Marquette	3	2007–2010	125	2,100	203	377	665	16.8	1.6	3.0	5.3	
Byron Dinkins	G	Charlotte	1	1990–1991	2	5	1	0	2	2.5	0.5	0.0	1.0	
Ike Diogu	F	Arizona State	2	2006–2008	72	843	225	30	411	11.7	3.1	0.4	5.7	
Greg Dreiling	C	Kansas	7	1986–1993	322	2,684	656	122	692	8.3	2.0	0.4	2.1	
Chris Duarte	G	Oregon	2	2021–2023	101	2,438	341	178	1,082	24.1	3.4	1.8	10.7	
Mike Dunleavy Jr.	G/F	Duke	5	2006–2011	271	8,146	1,248	651	3,787	30.1	4.6	2.4	14.0	
John Duren	G	Georgetown	1	1982–1983	82	1,433	107	200	369	17.5	1.3	2.4	4.5	
Devin Durrant	F	BYU	1	1984–1985	59	756	124	80	300	12.8	2.1	1.4	5.1	

=== E to F ===
All-time roster
Player	Pos.	Pre-draft team	Yrs	Seasons	Statistics									Ref.
Player	Pos.	Pre-draft team	Yrs	Seasons	GP	MP	REB	AST	PTS	MPG	RPG	APG	PPG	Ref.
Kenton Edelin	F	Virginia	1	1984–1985	10	143	26	10	11	14.3	2.6	1.0	1.1	
Charles Edge	F	LeMoyne–Owen	1	1974–1975	77	1,142	340	39	453	14.8	4.4	0.5	5.9	
Bobby Joe Edmonds	F	Tennessee State	2	1967–1968; 1969–1970	75	1,350	378	29	580	18.0	5.0	0.4	7.7	
Tyus Edney	G	UCLA	1	2000–2001	24	263	24	54	106	11.0	1.0	2.3	4.4	
James Edwards	F/C	Washington	4	1977–1981	303	8,917	2,277	487	4,811	29.4	7.5	1.6	15.9	
John Edwards	C	Kent State	1	2004–2005	25	139	19	3	29	5.6	0.8	0.1	1.2	
Monta Ellis	G	Lanier HS (MS)	2	2015–2017	155	4,732	475	619	1,751	30.5	3.1	4.0	11.3	
Len Elmore	F/C	Maryland	5	1974–1979	308	6,642	2,051	314	2,345	21.6	6.7	1.0	7.6	
Darrell Elston	G	North Carolina	1	1976–1977	5	40	6	2	5	8.0	1.2	0.4	1.0	
Alex English^	F	South Carolina	2	1978–1980	135	4,222	1,035	413	2,105	31.3	7.7	3.1	15.6	
Tyreke Evans	G/F	Memphis	1	2018–2019	69	1,402	201	166	706	20.3	2.9	2.4	10.2	
John Fairchild	F	BYU	2	1968–1970	55	608	120	30	288	11.1	2.2	0.5	5.2	
Duane Ferrell	G/F	Georgia Tech	3	1994–1997	172	2,313	322	127	827	13.4	1.9	0.7	4.8	
Kyrylo Fesenko	C	(Ukraine) Cherkaski Mavpy	1	2011–2012	3	17	9	1	8	5.7	3.0	0.3	2.7	
Vern Fleming	G	Georgia	11	1984–1995	816	22,974	2,842	4,038	9,535	28.2	3.5	4.9	11.7	
Mike Flynn	G	Kentucky	3	1975–1978	211	3,376	437	454	1,317	16.0	2.1	2.2	6.2	
T. J. Ford	G	Texas	3	2008–2011	162	4,220	489	713	1,813	26.0	3.0	4.4	11.2	
Jeff Foster	F/C	Texas State	13	1999–2012	764	15,750	5,248	703	3,747	20.6	6.9	0.9	4.9	
Tremaine Fowlkes	F	Fresno State	1	2004–2005	8	56	8	0	19	7.0	1.0	0.0	2.4	
Anthony Frederick	F	Pepperdine	1	1988–1989	46	313	52	20	152	6.8	1.1	0.4	3.3	
Donnie Freeman	G	Illinois	2	1972–1974	143	3,905	387	360	2,046	27.3	2.7	2.5	14.3	
Enrique Freeman	F	Akron	1	2024–2025	22	181	30	9	46	8.2	1.4	0.4	2.1	
Johnny Furphy^{x}	G	Kansas	2	2024–2026	85	1,022	224	60	283	12.0	2.6	0.7	3.3	

=== G to H ===
All-time roster
Player	Pos.	Pre-draft team	Yrs	Seasons	Statistics									Ref.
Player	Pos.	Pre-draft team	Yrs	Seasons	GP	MP	REB	AST	PTS	MPG	RPG	APG	PPG	Ref.
Bill Garnett	F	Wyoming	2	1984–1986	145	2,320	561	162	758	16.0	3.9	1.1	5.2	
Paul George^{+}	F	Fresno State	7	2010–2017	448	14,692	2,816	1,419	8,090	32.8	6.3	3.2	18.1	
Eddie Gill	G	Weber State	2	2004–2006	114	1,143	127	95	314	10.0	1.1	0.8	2.8	
Stephen Graham	G	Oklahoma State	2	2007–2009	74	812	118	42	369	11.0	1.6	0.6	5.0	
Danny Granger^{+}	F	New Mexico	9	2005–2014	544	17,680	2,780	1,072	9,571	32.5	5.1	2.0	17.6	
Travis Grant	F	Kentucky State	1	1975–1976	34	567	101	31	326	16.7	3.0	0.9	9.6	
Stuart Gray	F/C	UCLA	5	1984–1989	320	2,860	865	129	779	8.9	2.7	0.4	2.4	
Gerald Green	G/F	Gulf Shores Academy (TX)	1	2012–2013	60	1,080	141	50	421	18.0	2.4	0.8	7.0	
Rickey Green	G	Michigan	1	1989–1990	69	927	54	182	244	13.4	0.8	2.6	3.5	
Sean Green	G/F	Iona	2	1991–1993	48	337	51	29	203	7.0	1.1	0.6	4.2	
Steve Green	F	Indiana	3	1976–1979	153	1,632	300	97	705	10.7	2.0	0.6	4.6	
Orien Greene	G	Louisiana	1	2006–2007	41	254	44	22	63	6.2	1.1	0.5	1.5	
Dick Grubar	G	North Carolina	1	1969–1970	2	8	0	1	4	4.0	0.0	0.5	2.0	
Rudy Hackett	F	Syracuse	1	1976–1977	5	38	10	3	12	7.6	2.0	0.6	2.4	
Marcus Haislip	F	Tennessee	1	2004–2005	9	106	15	3	32	11.8	1.7	0.3	3.6	
Tyrese Haliburton*	G	Iowa State	4	2021–2025	224	7,496	846	2,259	4,362	33.5	3.8	10.1	19.5	
Darvin Ham	F	Texas Tech	1	1996–1997	1	5	0	0	3	5.0	0.0	0.0	3.0	
Ben Hansbrough	G	Notre Dame	1	2012–2013	28	200	18	21	57	7.1	0.6	0.8	2.0	
Tyler Hansbrough	F	North Carolina	4	2009–2013	246	4,854	1,167	135	2,195	19.7	4.7	0.5	8.9	
Tim Hardaway^	G	UTEP	1	2002–2003	10	127	15	24	49	12.7	1.5	2.4	4.9	
Reggie Harding	C	Martin Luther King HS (MI)	1	1967–1968	25	840	334	53	336	33.6	13.4	2.1	13.4	
Jerry Harkness	G	Loyola (IL)	2	1967–1969	81	1,513	227	150	589	18.7	2.8	1.9	7.3	
Al Harrington	F	St. Patrick HS (NJ)	7	1998–2004; 2006–2007	390	10,335	2,100	534	4,157	26.5	5.4	1.4	10.7	
David Harrison	C	Colorado	4	2004–2008	189	2,686	549	47	949	14.2	2.9	0.2	5.0	
Scott Haskin	F/C	Oregon State	1	1993–1994	27	186	55	6	55	6.9	2.0	0.2	2.0	
Joe Hassett	G	Providence	1	1979–1980	74	1,135	94	104	523	15.3	1.3	1.4	7.1	
Luther Head	G	Illinois	1	2009–2010	47	813	80	72	357	17.3	1.7	1.5	7.6	
Roy Hibbert^{+}	C	Georgetown	7	2008–2015	533	13,829	3,623	769	5,909	25.9	6.8	1.4	11.1	
Buddy Hield	G/F	Oklahoma	3	2021–2024	158	4,743	699	488	2,440	30.0	4.4	3.1	15.4	
Earle Higgins	F	Eastern Michigan	1	1970–1971	53	467	128	35	231	8.8	2.4	0.7	4.4	
George Hill	G	IUPUI	6	2011–2016; 2022–2023	330	10,285	1,213	1,265	3,981	31.2	3.7	3.8	12.1	
Jordan Hill	F/C	Arizona	1	2015–2016	73	1,513	451	87	645	20.7	6.2	1.2	8.8	
Solomon Hill	F	Arizona	3	2013–2016	169	3,473	521	253	1,022	20.6	3.1	1.5	6.0	
Darnell Hillman	F/C	San Jose State	6	1971–1977	477	13,317	3,999	717	5,074	27.9	8.4	1.5	10.6	
Nate Hinton	G/F	Houston	1	2021–2022	2	2	0	0	0	2.0	0.0	0.0	2.0	
Fred Hoiberg	G	Iowa State	4	1995–1999	139	1,618	224	98	536	11.6	1.6	0.7	3.9	
Aaron Holiday	G	UCLA	3	2018–2021	182	3,439	312	435	1,396	18.9	1.7	2.4	7.7	
Justin Holiday	G/F	Washington	3	2019–2022	194	5,425	629	302	1,900	28.0	3.2	1.6	9.8	
Bobby Hooper	G	Dayton	1	1968–1969	54	955	109	142	271	17.7	2.0	2.6	5.0	
Jay Huff^{x}	C	Virginia	1	2025–2026	82	1,719	324	121	783	21.0	4.0	1.5	9.5	

=== J ===
All-time roster
Player	Pos.	Pre-draft team	Yrs	Seasons	Statistics									Ref.
Player	Pos.	Pre-draft team	Yrs	Seasons	GP	MP	REB	AST	PTS	MPG	RPG	APG	PPG	Ref.
Warren Jabali	G/F	Wichita State	1	1970–1971	62	1,586	298	214	682	25.6	4.8	3.5	11.0	
Jarrett Jack	G	Georgia Tech	1	2008–2009	82	2,716	276	338	1,074	33.1	3.4	4.1	13.1	
Isaiah Jackson	F	Kentucky	5	2021–2026	201	3,076	908	147	1,413	15.3	4.5	0.7	7.0	
Mark Jackson	G	St. John's	6	1994–2000	405	12,083	1,539	3,294	3,412	29.8	3.8	8.1	8.4	
Quenton Jackson^{x}	G	Texas A&M	3	2023–2026	80	1,289	162	195	612	16.1	2.0	2.4	7.7	
Ralph Jackson	G	UCLA	1	1984–1985	1	12	1	4	2	12.0	1.0	4.0	2.0	
Stephen Jackson	G/F	Butler CC	3	2004–2007	169	5,902	657	458	2,803	34.9	3.9	2.7	16.6	
Tracy Jackson	G/F	Notre Dame	1	1983–1984	2	10	1	0	6	5.0	0.5	0.0	3.0	
DeJon Jarreau	G	Houston	1	2021–2022	1	1	0	0	0	1.0	0.0	0.0	0.0	
Šarūnas Jasikevičius	G	Maryland	2	2005–2007	112	2,221	201	338	820	19.8	1.8	3.0	7.3	
Al Jefferson	F/C	Prentiss HS (MS)	2	2016–2018	102	1,415	421	87	787	13.9	4.1	0.9	7.7	
Britton Johnsen	F	Utah	1	2004–2005	6	87	10	4	12	14.5	1.7	0.7	2.0	
Alize Johnson	F	Missouri State	2	2018–2020	31	182	67	8	47	5.9	2.2	0.3	1.5	
Anthony Johnson	G	College of Charleston	3	2003–2006	211	5,326	477	828	1,673	25.2	2.3	3.9	7.9	
Clemon Johnson	F/C	Florida A&M	4	1979–1983	290	6,379	1,752	501	2,294	22.0	6.0	1.7	7.9	
Eddie Johnson	G/F	Illinois	2	1995–1997	90	1,308	193	86	622	14.5	2.1	1.0	6.9	
George Johnson	F/C	St. John's	4	1980–1984	265	6,020	1,500	541	2,764	22.7	5.7	2.0	10.4	
Gus Johnson^	F/C	Idaho	1	1972–1973	50	753	245	62	299	15.1	4.9	1.2	6.0	
James Johnson	F	Wake Forest	3	2022–2025	39	246	40	27	67	6.3	1.0	0.7	1.7	
Mickey Johnson	F	Aurora	1	1979–1980	82	2,647	681	344	1,566	32.3	8.3	4.2	19.1	
Orlando Johnson	G	UC Santa Barbara	2	2012–2014	89	961	161	63	294	10.8	1.8	0.7	3.3	
Dahntay Jones	G/F	Duke	3	2009–2012	186	3,533	411	246	1,405	19.0	2.2	1.3	7.6	
Fred Jones	G/F	Oregon	4	2002–2006	245	5,728	547	528	1,884	23.4	2.2	2.2	7.7	
James Jones	G/F	Miami (FL)	2	2003–2005	81	1,356	176	57	378	16.7	2.2	0.7	4.7	
Kam Jones^{x}	G	Marquette	1	2025–2026	37	616	60	119	162	16.6	1.6	3.2	4.4	
Solomon Jones	F	South Florida	2	2009–2011	91	1,203	257	62	346	13.2	2.8	0.7	3.8	
Wil Jones	F	Albany State	1	1976–1977	80	2,709	604	189	1,042	33.9	7.6	2.4	13.0	
Charles Jordan	F	Canisius	1	1975–1976	71	855	216	53	369	12.0	3.0	0.7	5.2	
Cory Joseph	G	Texas	2	2017–2019	164	4,273	542	581	1,186	26.1	3.3	3.5	7.2	
Kevin Joyce	G	South Carolina	2	1973–1975	137	3,815	255	450	1,621	27.8	1.9	3.3	11.8	
Butch Joyner	F	Indiana	1	1968–1969	2	5	1	0	0	2.5	0.5	0.0	0.0	

=== K to M ===
All-time roster
Player	Pos.	Pre-draft team	Yrs	Seasons	Statistics									Ref.
Player	Pos.	Pre-draft team	Yrs	Seasons	GP	MP	REB	AST	PTS	MPG	RPG	APG	PPG	Ref.
Billy Keller	G	Purdue	7	1969–1976	556	13,609	1,349	1,980	6,588	24.5	2.4	3.6	11.8	
Clark Kellogg	F	Ohio State	5	1982–1987	260	8,514	2,482	764	4,918	32.7	9.5	2.9	18.9	
Arvesta Kelly	G	Lincoln (MO)	1	1971–1972	4	41	7	2	6	10.3	1.8	0.5	1.5	
Greg Kelser	F	Michigan State	1	1984–1985	10	114	19	13	62	11.4	1.9	1.3	6.2	
Lari Ketner	F/C	UMass	1	2000–2001	3	7	0	1	0	2.3	0.0	0.3	0.0	
Greg Kite	C	BYU	1	1994–1995	9	61	18	1	8	6.8	2.0	0.1	0.9	
Billy Knight^{+}	G/F	Pittsburgh	8	1974–1977; 1978–1983	585	17,787	3,448	1,395	10,780	30.4	5.9	2.4	18.4	
Ronald Kozlicki	F	Northwestern	1	1967–1968	37	354	69	14	109	9.6	1.9	0.4	2.9	
Bruce Kuczenski	F	UConn	1	1983–1984	5	51	9	2	14	10.2	1.8	0.4	2.8	
John Kuester	G	North Carolina	1	1979–1980	24	100	14	16	29	4.2	0.6	0.7	1.2	
Bo Lamar	G	Louisiana	1	1975–1976	35	908	98	135	547	25.9	2.8	3.9	15.6	
Jeremy Lamb	F	UConn	3	2019–2022	121	2,669	425	200	1,216	22.1	3.5	1.7	10.0	
Jerome Lane	F	Pittsburgh	1	1991–1992	3	30	18	4	6	10.0	6.0	1.3	2.0	
Ty Lawson	G	North Carolina	1	2015–2016	13	235	31	57	64	18.1	2.4	4.4	4.9	
T. J. Leaf	F	UCLA	3	2017–2020	139	1,203	278	42	465	8.7	2.0	0.3	3.3	
Jalen Lecque	G	Brewster Academy (NH)	1	2020–2021	4	12	5	2	5	3.0	1.3	0.5	1.3	
Caris LeVert	G/F	Michigan	2	2020–2022	74	2,366	312	346	1,454	32.0	4.2	4.7	19.6	
Freddie Lewis	G	Arizona State	8	1967–1974; 1976–1977	575	19,534	2,230	2,279	9,257	34.0	3.9	4.0	16.1	
Mike Lewis	F/C	Duke	1	1968–1969	24	457	181	29	197	19.0	7.5	1.2	8.2	
John Long	G/F	Detroit Mercy	3	1986–1989	205	5,054	512	496	2,575	24.7	2.5	2.4	12.6	
Sidney Lowe	G	NC State	1	1983–1984	78	1,238	122	269	324	15.9	1.6	3.4	4.2	
Kyle Macy	G	Kentucky	1	1986–1987	76	1,250	113	197	376	16.4	1.5	2.6	4.9	
Ian Mahinmi	C	(France) STB Le Havre	4	2012–2016	289	5,532	1,431	188	1,599	19.1	5.0	0.7	5.5	
Ed Manning	F	Jackson State	1	1975–1976	12	134	37	14	60	11.2	3.1	1.2	5.0	
Rawle Marshall	G/F	Oakland	1	2006–2007	40	361	29	13	99	9.0	0.7	0.3	2.5	
Bill Martin	F	Georgetown	1	1985–1986	66	691	102	52	332	10.5	1.5	0.8	5.0	
Cody Martin	F	Nevada	1	2025–2026	4	55	14	2	7	13.8	3.5	0.5	1.8	
Kelan Martin	F	Butler	2	2020–2022	62	766	131	38	328	12.4	2.1	0.6	5.3	
Garrison Mathews	G	Lipscomb	1	2025–2026	15	196	17	10	78	13.1	1.1	0.7	5.2	
Bennedict Mathurin	G/F	Arizona	4	2022–2026	237	6,800	1,086	434	3,811	28.7	4.6	1.8	16.1	
Wesley Matthews	G	Marquette	1	2018–2019	23	725	65	55	251	31.5	2.8	2.4	10.9	
Clyde Mayes	F	Furman	1	1976–1977	2	21	7	3	7	10.5	3.5	1.5	3.5	
Dwayne McClain	G	Villanova	1	1985–1986	45	461	30	67	157	10.2	0.7	1.5	3.5	
George McCloud	G/F	Florida State	4	1989–1993	247	3,875	497	503	1,364	15.7	2.0	2.0	5.5	
Mac McClung	G	Texas Tech	1	2025–2026	3	34	4	1	19	11.3	1.3	0.3	6.3	
T. J. McConnell^{x}	G	Arizona	7	2019–2026	448	8,969	1,277	2,367	3,911	20.0	2.9	5.3	8.7	
Doug McDermott	F	Creighton	4	2018–2021; 2023–2024	230	4,535	515	243	2,248	19.7	2.2	1.1	9.8	
George McGinnis^ (#30)	F/C	Indiana	7	1971–1975; 1979–1982	487	15,955	5,219	1,630	9,545	32.8	10.7	3.3	19.6	
Dominic McGuire	F	Fresno State	1	2012–2013	2	12	2	1	0	6.0	1.0	0.5	0.0	
Jerry McKee	G	Ohio	1	1969–1970	1	3	0	0	0	3.0	0.0	0.0	0.0	
Kevin McKenna	G/F	Creighton	1	1983–1984	61	923	95	114	387	15.1	1.6	1.9	6.3	
Derrick McKey	F/C	Alabama	8	1993–2001	450	12,488	1,961	1,210	3,968	27.8	4.4	2.7	8.8	
Trey McKinney-Jones	G	Miami (FL)	1	2017–2018	1	1	0	0	0	1.0	0.0	0.0	0.0	
Keith McLeod	G	Bowling Green	1	2006–2007	22	339	22	45	93	15.4	1.0	2.0	4.2	
Josh McRoberts	F	Duke	3	2008–2011	147	2,400	583	210	792	16.3	4.0	1.4	5.4	
Ron Mercer	G/F	Kentucky	2	2001–2003	85	1,884	177	122	618	22.2	2.1	1.4	7.3	
C. J. Miles	G/F	Skyline HS (TX)	3	2014–2017	210	5,081	618	186	2,510	24.2	2.9	0.9	12.0	
Brad Miller^{+}	C	Purdue	2	2001–2003	101	3,142	823	244	1,379	31.1	8.1	2.4	13.7	
Dick Miller	F	Toledo	1	1980–1981	5	34	4	4	4	6.8	0.8	0.8	0.8	
Jay Miller	F	Notre Dame	3	1968–1971	95	918	164	37	482	9.7	1.7	0.4	5.1	
Reggie Miller^ (#31)	G/F	UCLA	18	1987–2005	1,389	47,619	4,182	4,141	25,279	34.3	3.0	3.0	18.2	
Terry Mills	F	Michigan	1	2000–2001	14	113	21	5	25	8.1	1.5	0.4	1.8	
Sam Mitchell	F	Mercer	3	1992–1995	237	3,863	681	202	1,475	16.3	2.9	0.9	6.2	
Naz Mitrou-Long	G	Iowa State	1	2019–2020	5	47	7	8	14	9.4	1.4	1.6	2.8	
Ben Moore	F	SMU	1	2017–2018	2	9	1	1	0	4.5	0.5	0.5	0.0	
Guy Morgan	G	Wake Forest	1	1982–1983	8	46	17	7	15	5.8	2.1	0.9	1.9	
Monté Morris	G	Iowa State	1	2025–2026	6	65	7	9	18	10.8	1.2	1.5	3.0	
Richard Morton	G	Cal State Fullerton	1	1988–1989	2	11	0	1	6	5.5	0.0	0.5	3.0	
Rick Mount	G	Purdue	2	1970–1972	144	2,958	226	337	1,550	20.5	1.6	2.3	10.8	
Chris Mullin^	G/F	St. John's	3	1997–2000	179	3,938	485	304	1,676	22.0	2.7	1.7	9.4	
Troy Murphy	F/C	Notre Dame	4	2006–2010	262	8,117	2,398	553	3,474	31.0	9.2	2.1	13.3	
Ronald Murray	G	Shaw	1	2007–2008	23	527	47	80	254	22.9	2.0	3.5	11.0	

=== N to P ===
All-time roster
Player	Pos.	Pre-draft team	Yrs	Seasons	Statistics									Ref.
Player	Pos.	Pre-draft team	Yrs	Seasons	GP	MP	REB	AST	PTS	MPG	RPG	APG	PPG	Ref.
Calvin Natt	F	Louisiana-Monroe	1	1989–1990	14	164	35	9	57	11.7	2.5	0.6	4.1	
Kenny Natt	G	Louisiana-Monroe	1	1980–1981	19	149	15	10	59	7.8	0.8	0.5	3.1	
Andrew Nembhard^{x}	G	Gonzaga	4	2022–2026	265	7,437	716	1,384	2,954	28.1	2.7	5.2	11.1	
Aaron Nesmith^{x}	G/F	Vanderbilt	4	2022–2026	235	6,268	917	346	2,777	26.7	3.9	1.5	11.8	
Rasho Nesterović	C	Slovenia	1	2008–2009	70	1,214	240	109	473	17.3	3.4	1.6	6.8	
Bob Netolicky	F/C	Drake	8	1967–1972; 1973–1976	515	16,657	4,566	565	8,078	32.3	8.9	1.1	15.7	
Johnny Neumann	G/F	Ole Miss	2	1974–1975; 1977–1978	68	1,051	92	150	481	15.5	1.4	2.2	7.1	
Bill Newton	C	LSU	2	1972–1974	35	190	65	14	73	5.4	1.9	0.4	2.1	
Tristen Newton	G	UConn	1	2024–2025	5	8	0	1	3	1.6	0.0	0.2	0.6	
Georges Niang	F	Iowa State	1	2016–2017	23	93	17	5	21	4.0	0.7	0.2	0.9	
Dyron Nix	F	Tennessee	1	1989–1990	20	109	26	5	39	5.5	1.3	0.3	2.0	
Jordan Nwora	F	Louisville	2	2022–2024	42	774	145	68	407	18.4	3.5	1.6	9.7	
Jahlil Okafor	C	Duke	1	2024–2025	1	3	1	1	0	3.0	1.0	1.0	0.0	
Victor Oladipo^{+}	G	Indiana	4	2017–2021	139	4,527	718	603	2,865	32.6	5.2	4.3	20.6	
Jawann Oldham	C	Seattle	1	1990–1991	4	19	3	0	6	4.8	0.8	0.0	1.5	
Kevin Ollie	G	UConn	1	2001–2002	29	577	56	98	158	19.9	1.9	3.4	5.4	
Jermaine O'Neal^{+}	F/C	Eau Claire HS (SC)	8	2000–2008	514	17,997	4,933	1,010	9,580	35.0	9.6	2.0	18.6	
Kyle O'Quinn	F/C	Norfolk State	1	2018–2019	45	371	119	56	156	8.2	2.6	1.2	3.5	
Barry Orms	G	Saint Louis	1	1969–1970	9	143	37	13	51	15.9	4.1	1.4	5.7	
Louis Orr	F	Syracuse	2	1980–1982	162	3,738	692	266	1,777	23.1	4.3	1.6	11.0	
Andre Owens	G	Houston	1	2007–2008	31	392	47	47	123	12.6	1.5	1.5	4.0	
Tom Owens	F/C	South Carolina	2	1975–1976; 1981–1982	90	1,842	441	136	884	20.5	4.9	1.5	9.8	
Wayne Pack	G	Tennessee Tech	1	1974–1975	21	189	20	13	61	9.0	1.0	0.6	2.9	
Gerald Paddio	G/F	UNLV	1	1993–1994	7	55	5	4	19	7.9	0.7	0.6	2.7	
George Peeples	F/C	Iowa	3	1967–1969; 1972–1973	138	2,370	751	66	750	17.2	5.4	0.5	5.4	
Jeff Pendergraph	F	Arizona State	2	2011–2013	57	475	137	19	179	8.3	2.4	0.3	3.1	
Sam Perkins	F/C	North Carolina	3	1998–2001	193	3,408	595	134	1,017	17.7	3.1	0.7	5.3	
Reggie Perry	F/C	Mississippi State	1	2021–2022	1	10	1	0	2	10.0	1.0	0.0	2.0	
Ron Perry	G	Virginia Tech	1	1968–1969	27	865	73	97	365	32.0	2.7	3.6	13.5	
Chuck Person	F	Auburn	6	1986–1992	479	16,978	3,017	1,743	9,096	35.4	6.3	3.6	19.0	
Taelon Peter^{x}	G	Liberty	1	2025–2026	38	492	59	40	171	12.9	1.6	1.1	4.5	
Ricky Pierce	G	Rice	1	1995–1996	76	1,404	136	101	737	18.5	1.8	1.3	9.7	
Miles Plumlee	F/C	Duke	1	2012–2013	14	55	22	2	13	3.9	1.6	0.1	0.9	
Scot Pollard	C	Kansas	3	2003–2006	155	2,314	587	52	466	14.9	3.8	0.3	3.0	
Mark Pope	F	Kentucky	2	1997–1999	32	219	30	7	41	6.8	0.9	0.2	1.3	
James Posey	G/F	Xavier	1	2010–2011	49	839	147	34	240	17.1	3.0	0.7	4.9	
Micah Potter^{x}	F/C	Wisconsin	1	2025–2026	47	908	233	69	458	19.3	5.0	1.5	9.7	
Josh Powell	F	NC State	1	2006–2007	7	64	19	3	12	9.1	2.7	0.4	1.7	
Alex Poythress	F	Kentucky	1	2017–2018	25	104	17	2	26	4.2	0.7	0.1	1.0	
A. J. Price	G	UConn	4	2009–2012; 2014–2015	160	2,421	235	330	1,010	15.1	1.5	2.1	6.3	
Mike Price	G	Illinois	1	1971–1972	4	25	5	1	6	6.3	1.3	0.3	1.5	

=== Q to S ===
All-time roster
Player	Pos.	Pre-draft team	Yrs	Seasons	Statistics									Ref.
Player	Pos.	Pre-draft team	Yrs	Seasons	GP	MP	REB	AST	PTS	MPG	RPG	APG	PPG	Ref.
Trevelin Queen	G	New Mexico State	1	2022–2023	7	70	17	6	21	10.0	2.4	0.9	3.0	
Wayne Radford	G	Indiana	1	1978–1979	52	649	68	57	202	12.5	1.3	1.1	3.9	
Jimmy Rayl	G	Indiana	2	1967–1969	101	2,760	305	273	1,125	27.3	3.0	2.7	11.1	
Craig Raymond	C	BYU	1	1972–1973	6	33	10	1	5	5.5	1.7	0.2	0.8	
Davon Reed	G	Miami (FL)	1	2018–2019	10	47	6	3	12	4.7	0.6	0.3	1.2	
Clint Richardson	G	Seattle	2	1985–1987	160	3,620	394	613	1,295	22.6	2.5	3.8	8.1	
Norman Richardson	G	Hofstra	1	2001–2002	3	4	1	1	0	1.3	0.3	0.3	0.0	
Pooh Richardson	G	UCLA	2	1992–1994	111	3,418	377	810	1,139	30.8	3.4	7.3	10.3	
Rick Robey	F/C	Kentucky	1	1978–1979	43	849	254	53	370	19.7	5.9	1.2	8.6	
Glenn Robinson III	G/F	Michigan	3	2015–2018	137	2,273	351	90	685	16.6	2.6	0.7	5.0	
Jeremiah Robinson-Earl	F	Villanova	1	2025–2026	17	300	88	12	79	17.6	5.2	0.7	4.6	
Dave Robisch	F/C	Kansas	3	1975–1978	179	4,979	1,399	351	2,162	27.8	7.8	2.0	12.1	
Carlos Rogers	F/C	Tennessee State	1	2001–2002	22	168	38	3	59	7.6	1.7	0.1	2.7	
Jalen Rose	G/F	Michigan	6	1996–2002	402	11,990	1,465	1,355	5,712	29.8	3.6	3.4	14.2	
Dan Roundfield	F/C	Central Michigan	3	1975–1978	207	4,835	1,579	300	2,247	23.4	7.6	1.4	10.9	
Brian Rowsom	F	UNC Wilmington	1	1987–1988	4	16	5	1	6	4.0	1.3	0.3	1.5	
Damjan Rudež	F	(Croatia) Split	1	2014–2015	68	1,047	47	53	323	15.4	0.7	0.8	4.8	
Brandon Rush	G/F	Kansas	3	2008–2011	224	6,048	796	240	1,991	27.0	3.6	1.1	8.9	
Kareem Rush	G	Missouri	1	2007–2008	71	1,504	168	89	588	21.2	2.4	1.3	8.3	
Walker Russell	G	Western Michigan	1	1986–1987	48	511	55	129	157	10.6	1.1	2.7	3.3	
Domantas Sabonis^{+}	F/C	Gonzaga	5	2017–2022	319	9,670	3,342	1,324	5,199	30.3	10.5	4.2	16.3	
JaKarr Sampson	F	St. John's	2	2019–2021	63	787	165	25	290	12.5	2.6	0.4	4.6	
Mike Sanders	G/F	UCLA	3	1989–1992	172	2,969	423	206	1,000	17.3	2.5	1.2	5.8	
Dwayne Schintzius	C	Florida	1	1995–1996	33	297	78	14	111	9.0	2.4	0.4	3.4	
Russ Schoene	F/C	Chattanooga	1	1982–1983	31	520	101	27	243	16.8	3.3	0.9	7.8	
Detlef Schrempf^{+}	F/C	Washington	5	1988–1993	354	11,913	3,059	1,446	6,009	33.7	8.6	4.1	17.0	
Luis Scola	F	(Spain) Tau Ceramica	2	2013–2015	163	3,058	917	186	1,389	18.8	5.6	1.1	8.5	
Brent Scott	F/C	Rice	1	1996–1997	16	55	9	3	19	3.4	0.6	0.2	1.2	
Byron Scott	G	Arizona State	2	1993–1995	147	2,725	261	241	1,498	18.5	1.8	1.6	10.2	
Malik Sealy	G	St. John's	2	1992–1994	101	1,295	230	95	615	12.8	2.3	0.9	6.1	
Kevin Séraphin	F	(France) Cholet Basket	1	2016–2017	49	559	142	23	232	11.4	2.9	0.5	4.7	
Ben Sheppard^{x}	G	Belmont	3	2023–2026	185	3,433	461	252	1,043	18.6	2.5	1.4	5.6	
Pascal Siakam*	F	New Mexico State	3	2023–2026	181	5,908	1,270	651	3,935	32.6	7.0	3.6	21.7	
Jerry Sichting	G	Purdue	5	1980–1985	326	7,990	538	1,341	2,720	24.5	1.7	4.1	8.3	
Don Sidle	F/C	Oklahoma	2	1970–1972	57	922	242	41	398	16.2	4.2	0.7	7.0	
Courtney Sims	C	Michigan	1	2007–2008	3	11	2	1	0	3.7	0.7	0.3	0.0	
Scott Skiles	G	Michigan State	2	1987–1989	131	2,331	215	570	769	17.8	1.6	4.4	5.9	
Jose Slaughter	G	Portland	1	1982–1983	63	515	68	52	225	8.2	1.1	0.8	3.6	
Jalen Slawson^{x}	F	Furman	1	2025–2026	13	311	57	36	95	23.9	4.4	2.8	7.3	
Donald Sloan	G	Texas A&M	2	2013–2015	101	1,499	187	240	501	14.8	1.9	2.4	5.0	
Jalen Smith	F/C	Maryland	3	2021–2024	151	2,869	899	147	1,538	19.0	6.0	1.0	10.2	
Willie Smith	G	Missouri	1	1977–1978	1	7	0	1	0	7.0	0.0	1.0	0.0	
Rik Smits^{+}	C	Marist	12	1988–2000	867	23,100	5,277	1,215	12,871	26.6	6.1	1.4	14.8	
Ricky Sobers	G	UNLV	2	1977–1979	160	5,844	628	1,034	2,840	36.5	3.9	6.5	17.8	
Kevin Stacom	G	Providence	1	1978–1979	44	571	61	77	183	13.0	1.4	1.8	4.2	
Cassius Stanley	G	Duke	1	2020–2021	24	93	20	1	36	3.9	0.8	0.0	1.5	
Terence Stansbury	G	Temple	2	1984–1986	148	2,609	253	333	1,024	17.6	1.7	2.3	6.9	
Everette Stephens	G	Purdue	1	1988–1989	35	209	23	37	65	6.0	0.7	1.1	1.9	
Lance Stephenson	G/F	Cincinnati	7	2010–2014; 2016–2018; 2021–2022	338	8,313	1,493	1,063	3,083	24.6	4.4	3.1	9.1	
Brook Steppe	G/F	Georgia Tech	1	1983–1984	61	857	122	79	430	14.0	2.0	1.3	7.0	
Steve Stipanovich	C	Missouri	5	1983–1988	403	12,591	3,131	938	5,323	31.2	7.8	2.3	13.2	
Peja Stojaković	G/F	(Greece) PAOK	1	2005–2006	40	1,454	250	68	779	36.4	6.3	1.7	19.5	
Erick Strickland	G	Nebraska	1	2002–2003	71	1,275	145	209	458	18.0	2.0	2.9	6.5	
Mark Strickland	F	Temple	1	1994–1995	4	9	4	0	3	2.3	1.0	0.0	0.8	
Rodney Stuckey	G	Eastern Washington	3	2014–2017	168	3,845	488	445	1,694	22.9	2.9	2.6	10.1	
Edmond Sumner	G	Xavier	4	2017–2021	108	1,520	165	114	619	14.1	1.5	1.1	5.7	
Bruno Šundov	C	(Croatia) Split	2	2000–2002	33	208	44	5	75	6.3	1.3	0.2	2.3	
Keifer Sykes	G	Green Bay	1	2021–2022	32	566	45	62	180	17.7	1.4	1.9	5.6	

=== T to Z ===
All-time roster
Player	Pos.	Pre-draft team	Yrs	Seasons	Statistics									Ref.
Player	Pos.	Pre-draft team	Yrs	Seasons	GP	MP	REB	AST	PTS	MPG	RPG	APG	PPG	Ref.
Žan Tabak	C	(Socialist Federal Republic of Yugoslavia) Split	2	1999–2001	73	891	245	37	253	12.2	3.4	0.5	3.5	
Earl Tatum	G/F	Marquette	1	1977–1978	57	1,859	205	226	822	32.6	3.6	4.0	14.4	
Terry Taylor	F	Austin Peay	2	2021–2023	59	942	211	51	387	16.0	3.6	0.9	6.6	
Jeff Teague	G	Wake Forest	1	2016–2017	82	2,657	330	639	1,254	32.4	4.0	7.8	15.3	
Tom Thacker	G/F	Cincinnati	3	1968–1971	96	1,454	300	244	299	15.1	3.1	2.5	3.1	
Daniel Theis	C	(Germany) Ratiopharm Ulm	2	2022–2024	8	117	22	9	51	14.6	2.8	1.1	6.4	
Jim Thomas	G	Indiana	2	1983–1985	152	3,278	410	364	1,340	21.6	2.7	2.4	8.8	
Ethan Thompson^{x}	F	Oregon State	1	2025–2026	32	653	69	57	223	20.4	2.2	1.8	7.0	
Jack Thompson	G	South Carolina	1	1968–1969	2	4	1	2	2	2.0	0.5	1.0	1.0	
LaSalle Thompson	F/C	Texas	8	1988–1995; 1996–1997	417	7,924	2,250	462	2,408	19.0	5.4	1.1	5.8	
Tristan Thompson	F/C	Texas	1	2021–2022	4	66	18	2	29	16.5	4.5	0.5	7.3	
Jamaal Tinsley	G	Iowa State	7	2001–2008	398	12,016	1,368	2,786	4,144	30.2	3.4	7.0	10.4	
Wayman Tisdale	F/C	Oklahoma	4	1985–1989	289	8,140	1,860	374	4,402	28.2	6.4	1.3	15.2	
Sedric Toney	G	Dayton	1	1988–1989	2	9	2	0	2	4.5	1.0	0.0	1.0	
Obi Toppin^{x}	F	Dayton	3	2023–2026	185	3,699	744	311	1,955	20.0	4.0	1.7	10.6	
Raymond Townsend	G	UCLA	1	1981–1982	14	95	13	10	35	6.8	0.9	0.7	2.5	
Oscar Tshiebwe	C	Kentucky	1	2023–2024	8	42	16	2	26	5.3	2.0	0.3	3.3	
Evan Turner	G	Ohio State	1	2013–2014	27	571	86	64	192	21.1	3.2	2.4	7.1	
Myles Turner	F/C	Texas	10	2015–2025	642	18,454	4,349	813	9,031	28.7	6.8	1.3	14.1	
Peter Verhoeven	F	Fresno State	1	1986–1987	5	44	7	2	10	8.8	1.4	0.4	2.0	
Phil Wagner	G	Georgia Tech	1	1968–1969	12	180	23	14	36	15.0	1.9	1.2	3.0	
Granville Waiters	C	Ohio State	2	1983–1985	140	1,743	397	90	476	12.5	2.8	0.6	3.4	
Jarace Walker^{x}	F	Houston	3	2023–2026	184	3,480	683	342	1,465	18.9	3.7	1.9	8.0	
Samaki Walker	F	Louisville	1	2005–2006	7	22	3	0	2	3.1	0.4	0.0	0.3	
Brad Wanamaker	G	Pittsburgh	1	2021–2022	22	293	35	48	76	13.3	1.6	2.2	3.5	
T. J. Warren	F	NC State	2	2019–2021	71	2,319	294	104	1,388	16.0	3.6	0.9	6.6	
Bryan Warrick	G	Saint Joseph's	1	1985–1986	31	658	66	109	217	21.2	2.1	3.5	7.0	
Duane Washington Jr.	G	Ohio State	1	2021–2022	48	968	83	85	473	20.2	1.7	1.8	9.9	
C. J. Watson	G	Tennessee	2	2013–2015	120	2,615	264	315	984	21.8	2.2	2.6	8.2	
Earl Watson	G	UCLA	1	2009–2010	79	2,322	240	399	619	29.4	3.0	5.1	7.8	
David West	F/C	Xavier	4	2011–2015	285	8,727	1,987	799	3,979	30.6	7.0	2.8	14.0	
Mark West	F/C	Old Dominion	1	1997–1998	15	105	15	2	23	7.0	1.0	0.1	1.5	
Clinton Wheeler	G	William Paterson	1	1987–1988	59	513	40	103	149	8.7	0.7	1.7	2.5	
Shayne Whittington	F/C	Western Michigan	2	2014–2016	27	149	41	9	68	5.5	1.5	0.3	2.5	
Damien Wilkins	G/F	Georgia	1	2017–2018	19	152	16	9	33	8.0	0.8	0.5	1.7	
Herb Williams	F/C	Ohio State	8	1981–1989	577	18,455	4,494	1,402	8,637	32.0	7.8	2.4	15.0	
John Williams	F/C	LSU	1	1994–1995	34	402	62	27	100	11.8	1.8	0.8	2.9	
Kenny Williams	F	Barton CC	4	1990–1994	260	2,918	693	161	1,247	11.2	2.7	0.6	4.8	
Micheal Williams	G	Baylor	2	1990–1992	152	4,456	458	995	2,001	29.3	3.0	6.5	13.2	
Reggie Williams	G/F	Georgetown	1	1996–1997	2	33	7	2	5	16.5	3.5	1.0	2.5	
Shawne Williams	F	Memphis	2	2006–2008	111	1,523	259	81	617	13.7	2.3	0.7	5.6	
John Williamson	G	New Mexico State	2	1976–1978	72	2,504	194	243	1,424	34.8	2.7	3.4	19.8	
Bobby Wilson	G	Wichita State	1	1977–1978	12	86	12	8	30	7.2	1.0	0.7	2.5	
Marv Winkler	G	Louisiana	1	1971–1972	20	155	16	12	40	7.8	0.8	0.6	2.0	
James Wiseman	C	Memphis	2	2024–2026	5	63	9	3	19	12.6	1.8	0.6	3.8	
Randy Wittman	G/F	Indiana	4	1988–1992	159	1,718	126	154	394	10.8	0.8	1.0	2.5	
Isaiah Wong	G	Miami (FL)	1	2023–2024	1	4	0	0	2	4.0	0.0	0.0	2.0	
Haywoode Workman	G	Oral Roberts	4	1993–1997	215	3,987	446	822	1,094	18.5	2.1	3.8	5.1	
Gabe York	G	Arizona	2	2021–2023	5	77	8	9	32	15.4	1.6	1.8	6.4	
Joe Young	G	Oregon	3	2015–2018	127	1,077	130	119	429	8.5	1.0	0.9	3.4	
Sam Young	F	Pittsburgh	1	2012–2013	56	693	123	42	155	12.4	2.2	0.8	2.8	
Thaddeus Young	F	Georgia Tech	3	2016–2019	236	7,333	1,483	478	2,793	31.1	6.3	2.0	11.8	
Tony Zeno	F	Arizona State	1	1979–1980	8	59	14	1	14	7.4	1.8	0.1	1.8	
Ivica Zubac^{x}	C	(Serbia) Mega Basket	1	2025–2026	5	118	36	9	58	23.6	7.2	1.8	11.6	
