= 1968–69 Indiana Pacers season =

ABA professional basketball team season

- Division champions
- Head coach: Larry Staverman; Bobby Leonard
- Arena: Indiana State Fair Coliseum

Results
- Record: 44–34 (.564)
- Place: Division: 1st (Eastern)
- Playoff finish: ABA Finals (lost to Oaks 1–4)
- Stats at Basketball Reference

Local media
- Television: WLWI 13
- Radio: WIRE

The 1968–69 Indiana Pacers season was Indiana's second season in the ABA and second as a team. This season would be the debut of Bobby Leonard coaching the Indiana Pacers, who would remain that way for not just the rest of the season following Larry Staverman's firing as head coach after nine games into the season (resulting in a 2–7 record at that time), but also for the rest of their tenure in the ABA, as well as their first few seasons in the NBA following the eventual ABA-NBA merger of 1976, with Leonard remaining as the team's head coach until 1980. Under Leonard's coaching for the season, the Pacers would see significant improvement under him by comparison to how they started the season earlier on, to the point of finishing the season one game ahead of the recently rebranded Miami Floridians franchise to be named the best Eastern Division team that season, despite having a pedestrian-looking record of 44–34 at the top of the division. Despite that notion, the Pacers would end up making it all the way up to the second ABA Finals ever held, where they would ultimately lose the series to the Oakland Oaks in what later turned out to be their final season under that name before the Oaks moved to Washington, D.C. (albeit still playing as a Western Division team at the time, weirdly enough) to become the Washington Caps for a season before ultimately moving to the state of Virginia as a regional franchise that was also a proper Eastern Division team known as the Virginia Squires for the rest of their existence afterward.

== ABA Draft ==
Player	School/Club team
Don Dee	St. Mary of the Plains
Mike Lewis	Duke
Don May	Dayton
Bob Quick	Xavier
Phil Wagner	Georgia Tech
Dave Benedict	Central Washington
Rudy Bogad	St. John's
Jerry Newsom	Indiana State
Rich Niemann	St. Louis
Jack Thompson	South Carolina
Greg Cisson	Rider
Bobby Hooper	Dayton
Butch Joyner	Indiana
Tom Niemeier	Evansville

== Roster ==
1968–69 Indiana Pacers roster
Players

Pos.	No.	Player	Height	Weight	DOB	From
SF	35	Roger Brown	6 ft 5 in (1.96 m)	205 lb (93 kg)	May 22, 1942	Dayton
SG	20	Steve Chubin	6 ft 2 in (1.88 m)	200 lb (91 kg)	February 8, 1944	Rhode Island
C	34	Mel Daniels	6 ft 9 in (2.06 m)	220 lb (100 kg)	July 20, 1944	New Mexico
PF	40	Donald Dee	6 ft 8 in (2.03 m)	210 lb (95 kg)	August 9, 1943	St. Mary of the Plains College
SF	30	John Fairchild	6 ft 8 in (2.03 m)	205 lb (93 kg)	April 28, 1943	BYU
PG	15	Jerry Harkness	6 ft 2 in (1.88 m)	175 lb (79 kg)	May 7, 1940	Loyola University Chicago
PG	12, 20	Bobby Hooper	6 ft 0 in (1.83 m)	180 lb (82 kg)	December 22, 1946	Dayton
F	15	Butch Joyner	6 ft 5 in (1.96 m)	200 lb (91 kg)	April 26, 1945	Indiana
PG	14	Freddie Lewis	6 ft 0 in (1.83 m)	175 lb (79 kg)	July 1, 1943	Arizona State
C	42	Mike Lewis	6 ft 8 in (2.03 m)	225 lb (102 kg)	March 18, 1946	Duke
SF	32	Jay Miller	6 ft 5 in (1.96 m)	205 lb (93 kg)	July 19, 1943	Notre Dame
PF	24	Bob Netolicky	6 ft 9 in (2.06 m)	220 lb (100 kg)	August 2, 1942	Drake
C	43	George Peeples	6 ft 7 in (2.01 m)	190 lb (86 kg)	October 30, 1943	Iowa
SG	44	Ron Perry	6 ft 3 in (1.91 m)	190 lb (86 kg)	December 29, 1943	Virginia Tech
PG	23	Jimmy Rayl	6 ft 2 in (1.88 m)	175 lb (79 kg)	June 21, 1941	Indiana
PG	44	Tom Thacker	6 ft 2 in (1.88 m)	170 lb (77 kg)	November 2, 1939	Cincinnati
G	12	Jack Thompson	6 ft 1 in (1.85 m)	185 lb (84 kg)	March 26, 1946	South Carolina
G	11	Phil Wagner	6 ft 2 in (1.88 m)	190 lb (86 kg)	December 18, 1945	Georgia Tech

Coaches
Head coach
- Larry Staverman / Bobby Leonard

Legend
- (DP) Unsigned draft pick
- (FA) Free agent
- (S) Suspended
- Injured

Roster

== Season standings ==
=== Eastern Division ===
Team	W	L	Pct.
Indiana Pacers	44	34	.564
Miami Floridians	43	35	.551
Kentucky Colonels	42	36	.538
Minnesota Pipers	36	42	.462
New York Nets	17	61	.218

=== Western Division ===
Team	W	L	Pct.
Oakland Oaks	60	18	.769
New Orleans Buccaneers	46	32	.590
Denver Rockets	44	34	.564
Dallas Chaparrals	41	37	.526
Los Angeles Stars	33	45	.423
Houston Mavericks	23	55	.295

== Awards, records, and honors ==
- Mel Daniels won the 1969 ABA All-Star Game MVP along with the 1968-69 ABA MVP award.

=== ABA All-Stars ===
- Mel Daniels
- Bob Netolicky

== Team leaders ==
Stat	Player	Number
Points	Mel Daniels	24.0 per game
Rebounds	Mel Daniels	16.5 (11.5 defensive and 5.0 offensive rebounds)
Assists	Stephen Chubin	5.2 per game
Minutes	Freddie Lewis	39.2 per game
FG%	Bob Netolicky	.509

== ABA Playoffs ==
ABA Eastern Division Semifinals vs. Kentucky Colonels

Game	Date	Location	Score	Record	Attendance
1	April 8	Kentucky	L 118–128	0–1	6,319
2	April 9	Kentucky	W 120–115	1–1	6,789
3	April 10	@ Kentucky	L 111–130	1–2	4,235
4	April 13	@ Kentucky	L 104–105 (OT)	1–3	3,079
5	April 14	Kentucky	W 116–97	2–3	5,612
6	April 15	@ Kentucky	W 107–89	3–3	4,633
7	April 17	Kentucky	W 120–111	4–3	11,005

Pacers win series, 4–3

ABA Eastern Division Finals vs Miami Floridians

Game	Date	Location	Result	Record	Attendance
1	April 20	Miami	W 126–110	1–0	8,721
2	April 22	Miami	W 131–116	2–0	7,243
3	April 23	@ Miami	W 119–105	3–0	2,112
4	April 25	@ Miami	L 110–114	3–1	2,846
5	April 26	Miami	W 127–105	4–1	3,528

Pacers win series, 4–1

ABA Finals vs. Oakland Oaks

Game	Date	Location	Score	Record	Attendance
1	April 30	@ Oakland	L 114–123	0–1	3,290
2	May 2	@ Oakland	W 150–122	1–1	4,171
3	May 3	Oakland	L 126–134 (OT)	1–2	8,467
4	May 5	Oakland	L 117–144	1–3	7,133
5	May 7	@ Oakland	L 131–135 (OT)	1–4	6,340

Pacers lose championship series, 4–1
