= List of 1967–68 NBA season transactions =

These are the list of personnel changes in the NBA from the 1967–68 NBA season.

== Events ==
=== August ?, 1967 ===
- The Chicago Bulls signed Craig Spitzer as a free agent.

=== August 4, 1967 ===
- The Boston Celtics signed Tom Thacker as a free agent. Thacker was selected by Chicago in the expansion draft but did not sign.

=== August 31, 1967 ===
- The Detroit Pistons sold Rudy LaRusso to the San Francisco Warriors.

=== September 5, 1967 ===
- The St. Louis Hawks signed Jim Davis as a free agent.

=== September 18, 1967 ===
- The Seattle SuperSonics sold Nate Bowman to the New York Knicks.

=== October 2, 1967 ===
- The Detroit Pistons traded Reggie Harding to the Chicago Bulls for a 1968 3rd round draft pick (Don Dee was later selected).

=== October 3, 1967 ===
- The San Diego Rockets signed Art Williams as a free agent.

=== October 20, 1967 ===
- The Cincinnati Royals traded Flynn Robinson, a 1968 2nd round draft pick (Ron Dunlap was later selected) and a 1969 2nd round draft pick (Johnny Baum was later selected) to the Chicago Bulls for Guy Rodgers.

=== October 21, 1967 ===
- The Los Angeles Lakers signed Dennis Hamilton as a free agent.

=== October 29, 1967 ===
- The New York Knicks waived Jim Caldwell.

=== November 1, 1967 ===
- The Chicago Bulls signed Ken Wilburn as a free agent.

=== November 27, 1967 ===
- The Cincinnati Royals traded Len Chappell to the Detroit Pistons for a 1968 3rd round draft pick (Fred Foster was later selected).

=== December 27, 1967 ===
- The New York Knicks fired Dick McGuire as head coach.
- The New York Knicks hired Red Holzman as head coach.

=== January 9, 1968 ===
- The Chicago Bulls traded Erwin Mueller to the Los Angeles Lakers for Jim Barnes and a 1968 3rd round draft pick (Dave Newmark was later selected).

=== January 11, 1968 ===
- The San Diego Rockets traded Johnny Green to the Philadelphia 76ers for a 1968 4th round draft pick (Darryl Jones was later selected).

=== January 12, 1968 ===
- The New York Knicks sold Freddie Crawford to the Los Angeles Lakers.

=== January 21, 1968 ===
- The St. Louis Hawks traded Tom Workman and a 1968 3rd round draft pick (Jack Thompson was later selected) to the Baltimore Bullets for Don Ohl.

=== February 1, 1968 ===
- The Cincinnati Royals traded Jim Fox and Happy Hairston to the Detroit Pistons for John Tresvant and Tom Van Arsdale.
- The San Diego Rockets signed Bud Acton as a free agent.

=== April 24, 1968 ===
- Red Kerr resigns as head coach for Chicago Bulls.
- The Phoenix Suns hired Red Kerr as head coach.

=== May 2, 1968 ===
- The Los Angeles Lakers signed Jay Carty as a free agent.

=== May 6, 1968 ===
- The Phoenix Suns drafted John Barnhill from the San Diego Rockets in the NBA expansion draft.
- The Phoenix Suns drafted Em Bryant from the New York Knicks in the NBA expansion draft.
- The Milwaukee Bucks drafted Len Chappell from the Detroit Pistons in the NBA expansion draft.
- The Milwaukee Bucks drafted Larry Costello from the Philadelphia 76ers in the NBA expansion draft.
- The Milwaukee Bucks drafted Johnny Egan from the Baltimore Bullets in the NBA expansion draft.
- The Milwaukee Bucks drafted Wayne Embry from the Boston Celtics in the NBA expansion draft.
- The Milwaukee Bucks drafted Dave Gambee from the San Diego Rockets in the NBA expansion draft.
- The Phoenix Suns drafted Gail Goodrich from the Los Angeles Lakers in the NBA expansion draft.
- The Milwaukee Bucks drafted Gary Gray from the Cincinnati Royals in the NBA expansion draft.
- The Phoenix Suns drafted Dennis Hamilton from the Los Angeles Lakers in the NBA expansion draft.
- The Milwaukee Bucks drafted Fred Hetzel from the San Francisco Warriors in the NBA expansion draft.
- The Phoenix Suns drafted Neil Johnson from the New York Knicks in the NBA expansion draft.
- The Milwaukee Bucks drafted Johnny Jones from the Boston Celtics in the NBA expansion draft.
- The Phoenix Suns drafted Dave Lattin from the San Francisco Warriors in the NBA expansion draft.
- The Phoenix Suns drafted Paul Long from the Detroit Pistons in the NBA expansion draft.
- The Milwaukee Bucks drafted Bob Love from the Cincinnati Royals in the NBA expansion draft.
- The Milwaukee Bucks drafted Jon McGlocklin from the San Diego Rockets in the NBA expansion draft.
- The Phoenix Suns drafted Stan McKenzie (basketball) from the Baltimore Bullets in the NBA expansion draft.
- The Phoenix Suns drafted McCoy McLemore from the Chicago Bulls in the NBA expansion draft.
- The Phoenix Suns drafted Bill Melchionni from the Philadelphia 76ers in the NBA expansion draft.
- The Milwaukee Bucks drafted Jay Miller from the St. Louis Hawks in the NBA expansion draft.
- The Milwaukee Bucks drafted Bud Olsen from the Seattle SuperSonics in the NBA expansion draft.
- The Milwaukee Bucks drafted George Patterson from the Detroit Pistons in the NBA expansion draft.
- The Milwaukee Bucks drafted Jim Reid from the Philadelphia 76ers in the NBA expansion draft.
- The Milwaukee Bucks drafted Guy Rodgers from the Cincinnati Royals in the NBA expansion draft.
- The Phoenix Suns drafted Dave Schellhase from the Chicago Bulls in the NBA expansion draft.
- The Phoenix Suns drafted Dick Snyder from the St. Louis Hawks in the NBA expansion draft.
- The Phoenix Suns drafted Craig Spitzer from the Chicago Bulls in the NBA expansion draft.
- The Milwaukee Bucks drafted Tom Thacker from the Boston Celtics in the NBA expansion draft.
- The Phoenix Suns drafted Gene Tormohlen from the St. Louis Hawks in the NBA expansion draft.
- The Phoenix Suns drafted Dick Van Arsdale from the New York Knicks in the NBA expansion draft.
- The Milwaukee Bucks drafted Bob Warlick from the San Francisco Warriors in the NBA expansion draft.
- The Milwaukee Bucks drafted Bob Weiss from the Seattle SuperSonics in the NBA expansion draft.
- The Phoenix Suns drafted Roland West from the Baltimore Bullets in the NBA expansion draft.
- The Phoenix Suns drafted John Wetzel from the Los Angeles Lakers in the NBA expansion draft.
- The Phoenix Suns drafted George Wilson from the Seattle SuperSonics in the NBA expansion draft.

=== May 14, 1968 ===
- The San Francisco Warriors hired George Lee as head coach.
