= John Thomson =

John Thomson may refer to:

== Arts and entertainment ==
- John Thomson of Duddingston (1778–1840), Scottish minister and landscape artist
- John Thomson (comedian) (born 1969), English comedian and actor
- John Thomson (composer) (1805–1841), Scottish composer
- John Thomson (photographer) (1837–1921), Scottish photographer
- John J. Thomson, Canadian production sound mixer
- John M. Thomson (1926–1999), New Zealand musicologist
- John Stuart Thomson (1869–1950), American author

== Business ==
- John Edgar Thomson (1808–1874), American civil engineer, railroad executive and industrialist
- John Thomson (Australian businessman) (1887–1960), longtime general manager of Wesfarmers
- John Thomson (banker) (1908–1998), British banker

== Politics ==
- John Thomson (Australian politician) (1862–1934), Nationalist member of the House of Representatives
- John Thomson (Western Australian politician) (1865–1947), Nationalist Member of the Western Australian Legislative Assembly
- John Thomson (Victorian politician) (1853–1917), Commonwealth Liberal Member of the Victorian Legislative Assembly
- John Bryce Thomson (1840–1911), mayor of Dunedin, New Zealand
- John Charles Thomson (1866–1934), New Zealand politician
- John Thomson (MP) (1521–1597), MP for New Windsor and Bedfordshire
- John Thomson (diplomat) (1927–2018), British high commissioner to India and ambassador to the UN
- John Thomson (Ohio politician) (1780–1852), U.S. Congressman from Ohio
- John Renshaw Thomson (1800–1862), U.S. Senator from New Jersey
- John William Thomson (1928–2025), member of the Canadian Parliament

== Religion ==
- John Thomson (Presbyterian minister) (1690–1753), Irish-born Presbyterian minister in Philadelphia
- John Thomson (bishop) (born 1959), Church of England Bishop of Selby
- John Thomson, minister in Sutherland, Scotland who was responsible for recording the works of the poet Rob Donn

== Science ==
- John Thomson (physician) (1765–1846), Scottish surgeon and physician
- John Thomson (cartographer) (1777–1840), Scottish cartographer
- John Millar Thomson (1849–1933), British chemist
- Arthur Thomson (naturalist) (John Arthur Thomson, 1861–1933), Scottish naturalist
- John Walter Thomson (1913–2009), Scottish-American lichenologist

== Sports ==
- Jock Thomson (1906–1979), Scottish football player and manager
- John Thomson (footballer, born 1896) (1896–1980), Scottish football goalkeeper
- John Thomson (footballer, born 1909) (1909–1931), Scottish football goalkeeper
- John Thomson (footballer, born 1915) (1915–1944), Scottish footballer
- John Thomson (swimmer) (1903–1976), British freestyle swimmer who competed in the 1924 Summer Olympics
- Johnny Thomson (1922–1960), American race car driver
- John Thomson (footballer, born 1954) (born 1954), English footballer
- John Thomson (baseball) (born 1973), American baseball player
- John Thomson (bowls), Welsh international lawn bowls player
- John Thomson (rower) (1932–2019), English international rower

== Other ==
- John Thomson (fraudster), warehouse keeper of the Charitable Corporation
- John Thomson (librarian) (1835–1916), American librarian
- John Thomson (RAF officer) (1941–1994), one of the senior officers of the Royal Air Force, later Commander-in-Chief Strike Command
- John Bell Thomson (1835–1896), New Zealand police officer and detective
- John Deas Thomson (c. 1763–1838), British Navy administrator
- John Sen Inches Thomson (1845–1933), Scottish whaler and sealer, ship owner, captain and author
- John Turnbull Thomson (1821–1884), English civil engineer
- John Thomson (died 1998), Deputy Steward of Oxford University and Lord Lieutenant of Oxfordshire

== See also ==
- Jack Thomson (disambiguation)
- John Thompson (disambiguation)
- Jon Thomson (born 1969), British artist
