= Jack Thompson =

Jack Thompson may refer to:

== Sports ==
- Jack Thompson (footballer, born 1892) (1892–1969), English footballer who played for Sheffield United and Bristol City
- Jack Thompson (1920s footballer), English footballer who played for Aston Villa and Brighton & Hove Albion
- Jack Thompson (boxer) (1904–1946), American boxer
- Jack Thompson (Australian footballer) (1927–1961), Australian footballer for Collingwood
- Jack Thompson (basketball) (born 1946), American professional basketball player
- Jack Thompson (American football) (born 1956), American Samoan football quarterback
- Jack Thompson (cyclist) (born 1988), Australian ultra-distance cyclist
- Jack Thompson (ice hockey) (born 2002), Canadian ice hockey player

== Other ==
- Jack Thompson (politician) (1928–2011), British politician
- Jack Thompson (actor) (born 1940), Australian film and television star
- T. Jack Thompson (1943–2017), Irish missiologist and scholar of African Christianity
- Jack Thompson (activist) (born 1951), disbarred Florida attorney known for his campaigns against violent video games
- Jack Thompson, a fictional character from Marvel's Agent Carter

== See also ==
- Jack Thomson (disambiguation)
- John Thompson (disambiguation)
