= Jack Thomson =

Jack Thomson may refer to:

- Jack Thomson (footballer, born 1929), Australian rules footballer
- Jack Thomson (politician) (1907–1997), Australian politician
- Jack Thomson (footballer, born 2000), Scottish footballer

== See also ==
- Jack Thompson (disambiguation)
- John Thompson (disambiguation)
- John Thomson (disambiguation)
