= Muzaffar Mahmood =

Pakistani-born Scottish cricketer

Personal information
- Full name: Muzaffar Mahmood
- Born: 13 June 1963 (age 63); Lahore, Punjab, Pakistan
- Batting: Right-handed
- Bowling: Right-arm off break

Domestic team information
- Years: Team
- 1990: Scotland

Career statistics
Competition	First-class
Matches	1
Runs scored	3
Batting average	3.00
100s/50s	–/–
Top score	3
Balls bowled	186
Wickets	4
Bowling average	25.75
5 wickets in innings	–
10 wickets in match	–
Best bowling	3/63
Catches/stumpings	1/–
- Source: Cricinfo, 20 October 2022

Muzaffar Mahmood (born 13 June 1963) is a Pakistani-born Scottish former first-class cricketer. He is the father of Aqsa Mahmood, an ISIS bride.

Mahmood was born at Lahore in June 1963. He emigrated to Scotland as a child in the 1970s, where he was educated at Bellahouston Academy. A club cricketer for Clydesdale, Mahmood was selected to tour Pakistan with the Scottish Select team in November 1989. The following year he represented Scotland in a first-class match against Ireland at Edinburgh, becoming the first Pakistani-born player to represent Scotland. Playing as an off break bowler in the Scottish team, he took three wickets in Ireland's first innings and the only wicket to fall in their second innings, finishing with match figures of 4 for 104.

Mahmood is married to Khalida, with the couple having four children. Their daughter, Aqsa, gained notoriety in 2013 when she fled to Syria to become an ISIS bride, having become radicalised. As of 2026, Aqsa is presumed to have been killed in fighting in February 2019 in the Syrian civil war.
