= Bellahouston Academy =

School in Glasgow, Scotland

Coordinates: 55.84829°N 4.30059°W

- Bellahouston, Glasgow, Scotland

Information
- Motto: Alere Flammam (Keep the Flame Burning)
- Founded: 1876
- Founder: Alexander Sim
- Head teacher: Barry Mochan
- Enrollment: 1117
- Feeder schools: Glendale Primary; Ibrox Primary; Lorne Street Primary; Mosspark Primary; Pollokshields Primary

Bellahouston Academy is a non-denominational state-run secondary school in Bellahouston, south-west Glasgow, Scotland.

== History ==
Bellahouston Academy first opened in 1876 on Paisley Road West as a private school run by Alexander Sim, It was taken over by the Govan School Board in 1885, and has been a state school ever since.

The Misses Steven from Bellahouston donated the land for a new academy and helped pay for a clocktower. The building was designed by architect Robert Balde, who worked on Bath Street. When the academy first opened, it called itself a 'Boy's High Class School and Ladies' College'. For the first nine years, it faced many challenges as a private school, especially with new schools opening nearby that received government funding. In an effort to save money, the academy even removed the position of rector, who usually plays a leading role. In 1885, the academy transitioned to a different status; it was sold to the Govan Parish School Board for £15,000. They made improvements, including adding a swimming pool, which was among the first in Scotland.

In 1901, the institute was opened to train pupil-teachers, but when this system was replaced in 1907 by a junior system, the Institute became part of the academy, which by now had become a Secondary School and Junior Student Centre. In 1905, the main building was renovated and a new gymnasium and baths were built.

In 1919, the academy passed into the care of the new Glasgow Education Authority, which itself was replaced in 1929 by the Education Committee of the Corporation of Glasgow. In the 1930s, the academy lost its title and was renamed Bellahouston Secondary School, but its name never changed locally, and like other schools, it was permitted to revert to its old title.

=== New school ===
In 1962, the modern building in Gower Terrace was opened and took in pupils and staff from Pollokshields Secondary, (a former rival, Albert Road Academy). In 1973, due to increasing numbers, the old building on Paisley Road West was re-opened. This building is now an Ethnic Minority Business Centre.

Pupils going to the school were disrupted by the building of the M8/M77 interchange which was completed in 1977. There was a major fire in 1991 in which part of the building was structurally damaged and had to be demolished. In 1996, the school returned to the refurbished main building, which is designed to hold 1,100 pupils.

== Glasgow School of Sport ==
Scotland's first school dedicated to sport has been developed at Bellahouston Academy, the Glasgow School of Sport aims to develop the talents of young sportsmen and women. The Sports Hall was completed in October 2002, and was opened by The Princess Royal in 2003. The School of Sport specialises in five sports - athletics; gymnastics; hockey; badminton and swimming. In 2005, the school's under-16 football team won both the Glasgow League and Scottish Cup Final at Firhill in the same season.

== Roll ==
Attendance for 2010-2011 was 864. Attendance in Oct 2023 is 1117.

== Notable former pupils ==
- Adrian Beers - double bassist
- Jack Bruce - musician and songwriter, former vocalist / bassist with Cream
- Ian Durrant - ex Rangers, Kilmarnock, and Scotland footballer.
- Elaine Gray - British Olympic swimmer, Montreal 1976; and former 100 metres freestyle British record holder, in 1976
- Morag Hood - Actress
- Charles Hutton - architect and former Master of the Art Workers' Guild
- Michael Jamieson - former swimmer graduated from Glasgow School of Sport, silver medalist in Olympic and Commonwealth Games
- Jimmy Logan - entertainer, theatre owner, producer, director, and actor.
- Tormod MacGill-Eain - entertainer, Gaelic singer, piper, novelist, broadcaster
- Muzaffar Mahmood – cricketer, first Pakistani-born player to play for Scotland
- Elaine McSporran (née Roulston) SNP Glasgow City Councillor for the Cardonald Ward.Elected in 2017
- Chris Rainbow - (Christopher Harley), musician and songwriter
- Andy Roxburgh - former professional footballer and Scotland manager
- Andy Scott - sculptor (including 'The Kelpies' near Falkirk)
- Mary Symon - former athlete
- Tom Taylor - Thomas Johnston Taylor, Baron Taylor of Gryfe FRSE DL LLD (1912 - 2001), Labour politician, businessman (including as chairman of the Scottish Co-operative Wholesale Society 1965-70)
- Sir John Thompson - judge
- Russell Webb - guitarist with the Zones, The Skids, Armoury Show and Public Image Ltd.
- Chick Young - sports journalist
