= Jon Thompson =

Jon Thompson may refer to:

- Jon Thompson (artist) (1936–2016), British artist, curator and academic
- Jon Thompson (carpet scholar) (1938-2020), British scholar and curator in the field of oriental carpets and textiles
- Jon Thompson (civil servant) (born 1964), British civil servant
- Jon W. Thompson (1954–2019), American judge

== See also ==
- Jonathan Thompson (disambiguation)
- John Thompson (disambiguation)
