= Jonathan Thompson =

Jonathan Thompson may refer to:

- Jonathan Thompson (collector) (1773–1846), 19th-century New York politician
- Jonathan Thompson (lawyer) (1782–1823), American lawyer and land speculator in Mississippi
- Jonathan M. Thompson (born 1971), game designer
- Jon Thompson (civil servant) (born 1964), British civil servant

== See also ==
- John Thompson (disambiguation)
- Jon Thompson (disambiguation)
- Jon Thomson (born 1969), British visual artist
