= John Thomson (librarian) =

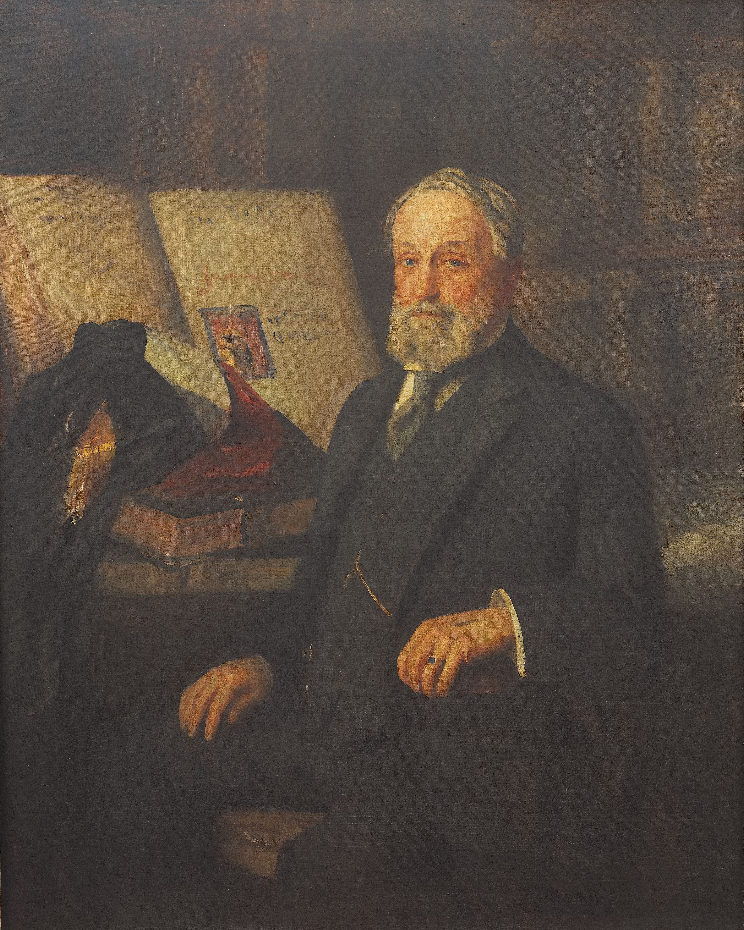
- Born: 1835
- Died: 1916 (aged 80–81)
- Occupation: Librarian
- Known for: first head librarian of the Free Library of Philadelphia
- Spouse(s): Mary Ann Faulkner Thomson

John Thomson (1835–1916) was the first head librarian of the Free Library of Philadelphia.

Thomson was born in Norfolk, England and attended St. Paul's School, London. He emigrated to the US in 1881.

Before the Free Library of Philadelphia, Thomson was the private librarian of Jay Gould and Clarence H. Clark.

When the library opened in March 1894, Thomson's mission statement was "Free Books for All".

He compiled a bibliography of all the incunabula in the US and purchased a number of rare books for the library, including Walter Arthur Copinger's collection of 500 incunabula and fourteen Portuguese antiphonaries given to the College of Saint Jerome by King John III.

He was married to Mary Ann Thomson (1834–1923), writer of Protestant hymns. They had a dozen children.
