= John Thompson (rugby union, born 1886) =

- Born: John Thompson circa 1886 Warwick, Queensland
- Died: circa 1978 (aged 91–92)
- Occupation: Rugby union player

Rugby union career
- Position: flanker
International career
Years	Team	Apps	(Points)
1914	Wallabies	1	(0)

John Thompson (c. 1886 – c. 1978) was a rugby union player who represented Australia.

Thompson, a flanker, was born in Warwick, Queensland, and claimed 1 international rugby cap for Australia.
