= John Thompson (footballer, born 1888) =

English footballer

Personal information
- Full name: John William Thompson
- Date of birth: 1888
- Place of birth: Alnwick, England
- Date of death: 1984 (aged 85–86)
- Position: Winger

Senior career*
| Years | Team | Apps | (Gls) |
| 1905–1906 | Alnwick Town | | |
| 1906–1907 | North Shields Athletic | | |
| 1907–1910 | Sunderland | 34 | (15) |
| 1910–1912 | Preston North End | 58 | (9) |
- * Club domestic league appearances and goals

John William Thompson (1888 – after 1911) was an English professional footballer who played as a winger for Sunderland.
