= John Thompson (Royal Navy officer) =

British Royal Navy admiral

Admiral John Thompson
- Born: 1776
- Died: 30 January 1864 (aged 87–88)
- Occupation: Royal Navy admiral

John Thompson (1776 – 30 January 1864) was a British Royal Navy admiral.

== Biography ==
Thompson was born in 1776. He entered the navy in December 1787, and, having been borne on the books of various ships on the home station, joined the Lion in June 1792 with Captain Erasmus Gower, and in her made the voyage to China. On his return he was promoted, on 18 December 1794, to be a lieutenant of the Bombay Castle in the Mediterranean, one of the fleet with William Hotham in the action off Toulon on 13 July 1795, with Jervis during the blockade of Toulon in 1796, and wrecked in the Tagus in December 1796. For his exertions at that time in saving life he was commended and thanked by Vice-admiral Charles Thompson, the president of the court-martial to inquire into the loss of the ship. He was afterwards in the Acasta in the West Indies, and, having distinguished himself in several boat expeditions, was appointed to his flagship, the Sans Pareil, by Lord Hugh Seymour. After Seymour's death he was promoted by his successor, Rear-admiral Robert Montagu, on 28 April 1802, to the command of the Tisiphone sloop. He returned to England in January 1803, commanded a division of Sea Fencibles for a year, and in January 1806 was appointed to the Fly sloop, in which he was for some time in the West Indies, afterwards at the Cape of Good Hope and in the Plate River, where he had command of the flotilla intended to co-operate in the attack on Buenos Ayres, assisted in landing the army, and afterwards in re-embarking it. He was then appointed acting captain of the Fuerte, and went home in charge of convoy; but the admiralty refused to confirm the promotion, and Thompson was sent back to the Fly, which he commanded on the French coast during 1808. In 1809 he commanded a division of the flotilla in the Scheldt, and was advanced to post rank on 21 October 1810. He had no further service, but on 1 October 1846 accepted the rank of rear-admiral on the retired list, on which he rose in course of seniority to be vice-admiral on 27 May 1854, and admiral on 9 June 1860. He died on 30 January 1864, aged 88. He married in 1805 a sister of Dr. Pickering of the Military College at Sandhurst, and had a large family. One son, Thomas Pickering Thompson, died an admiral, at the age of eighty-one, in 1892.
