= John Hannay Thompson =

British civil engineer

John Hannay Thompson FRSE MICE (1869–c. 1940) was a British civil engineer and technical author. He specialised in harbour works and made studies on the unintentional interaction of ships in the water.

== Life ==
He was born in Newcastle-upon-Tyne the son of John Thompson, also a civil engineer. He was educated at Trinity College, Harrogate then studied engineering at Durham University and at the Armstrong College in Newcastle.

His working career began around 1890, his first project being the graving dock for Wallsend Slipway Company. He then worked on the new graving docks at both South Shields and Blyth, before venturing to Europe to work on the graving dock at Bilbao. He then obtained the highly prestigious position as Engineer-in-Charge of the No1 Admiralty Harbour Works at Dover, Britain's premier port. From this role he was appointed General Manager and Chief Engineer of Dundee Harbour Trust.

In 1907, he was elected a Fellow of the Royal Society of Edinburgh. His proposers were Johannes Kuenen, Sir D'Arcy Wentworth Thompson, Angus McGillivray and Sir James Walker. He resigned from the Society in 1915.

In the First World War, he was a Captain in the Volunteer Brigade of the Black Watch.

He lived his later live at "Sorbie" a large villa in Broughty Ferry.

== Publications ==
- Suction or Interaction Between Passing Vessels
- Dundee Harbour Trust Centenary (1930)
- Dundee Harbour Trust (1933)
- Granton Harbour (1934)
- Granton Harbour Centenary (1937)

== Family ==
His son, John Horace Hannay-Thompson, was also a civil engineer, graduating from St Andrews University in 1924.
