= John Bell Thomson =

New Zealand police officer and detective

John Bell Thomson (1835?–1896) was a notable New Zealand police officer and detective. He was born in London, England in about 1835.
