= John Thompson (rugby union, born 1898) =

Irish rugby union player

- Full name: John Knox Stafford Thompson
- Born: 15 July 1898 United States
- Died: 13 July 1951 (aged 52) Canterbury, England
- School: Royal School Dungannon
- University: Trinity College Dublin
- Occupation: Medical practitioner

Rugby union career
- Position: Flanker
International career
Years	Team	Apps	(Points)
1921–23	Ireland	8	(0)

John Knox Stafford Thompson (15 July 1898 — 13 July 1951) was an Irish rugby union international.

Thompson was born in the United States, where his father was an ordained minister, but grew up in Ireland and attended Royal School Dungannon. He served with the Royal Irish Rifles in World War I. A Dublin University captain, Thompson gained eight caps as a flanker for Ireland from 1921 to 1923, which included a stint leading the team. He was awarded a Fellowship of the Royal College of Surgeons of Edinburgh in 1932 and went on to practice medicine in Shropshire.

== See also ==
- List of Ireland national rugby union players
