= John Thompson (writer, born 1918) =

American poet (1918–2002)

John Anderson Thompson Jr. (June 14, 1918 – June 24, 2002) was an American professor, poet, literary critic and writer whose literary career spanned sixty years, from 1938 to 1998.

== Early life ==
Thompson was born and raised in Grand Rapids, Michigan. His father, John Anderson Thompson, owned and operated a typewriter store there. His mother, Grace George, was active in promoting early childhood education. She died when he was five years old, a devastating loss and the subject of his posthumously published novel Things to Put Away.

Thompson attended Sigsbee School (1924–1930) and Ottawa Hills High School (Michigan) (1930–1936), where he wrote and produced Paul Bunyon, a verse play with music from Stravinsky under the tutelage of his beloved teacher Mary Baloyan.

== Education ==
Thompson attended Grand Rapids Junior College for two years and was then admitted on full scholarship to Kenyon College to be a student of John Crowe Ransom. There he lived at Douglass House, the writer's house, with Robert Lowell, Peter Taylor (writer), Robie Macauley, and Randall Jarrell. Saunders p. 240. He graduated magna cum laude in 1940. He was admitted to Columbia University for graduate studies but deferred for military service from 1941 to 1945.

At Columbia, Thompson studied poetry and literature and received his Ph.D. in 1957 under the mentorship of Lionel Trilling. He taught as an English instructor at Bard College (1946–1947), Sarah Lawrence College (1947–1949), as well as at Columbia University (1949–1956) while doing graduate studies. His dissertation, an analysis of the origins of poetic metre, was published in 1961 as The Founding of English Metre by Columbia University Press (New York) and Routledge and Kegan Paul (London). It was reprinted in 1966 by Columbia with an introduction by John Hollander.

== Career ==
As early as 1952 Thompson began publishing scholarly articles in Partisan Review and Hudson Review which brought him to the attention of the New York literary circle. (Saunders p. 241). Thompson was hired as executive director of the Farfield Foundation, a CIA-funded organization which gave small grants to third world writers and intellectuals. He worked there from 1956 until 1965, frequently traveling to Africa (Saunders p. 137-138). He continued publishing literary criticism and essays and stories during this time and throughout his life in numerous journals including Poetry Magazine, The Kenyon Review, The New York Review of Books, Commentary, Harper's, The New York Times Book Review, Parnassus, Shenandoah (magazine), and The American Scholar (magazine). (See Bibliography.)

After leaving Farfield, Thompson was hired as full Professor of English Literature at Stony Brook University in 1965. He retired in 1983.

== Personal life ==
Thompson met his first wife, Helen Louise Keeler (Dilly), when he was home on furlough in 1944. She was a Grand Rapids native, and a recent graduate in the first graduating class of Bennington College who was teaching at Grand Rapids Art School. They married in June 1944, three months after they met.

After the war, they moved to New York so that Thompson could do his graduate work at Columbia. They had three children, Louise Steketee Thompson, Keeler George Thompson, and Peter Spaulding Thompson, who was named after his close friend, Peter Taylor (writer). Peter died in a car accident at nineteen in 1972. Thompson and his wife were divorced in 1962. Thompson married Susan Otis in 1963. Susan Otis Thompson later studied at Columbia University School of Library Service where she obtained her Ph.D. and taught until her retirement. Her dissertation, American Book Design and William Morris, was published in 1977 by R.R. Bowker.

Thompson died in New York at his home in Manhattan on June 24, 2002, at the age of eighty-three.

== Awards and honors ==
Thompson was a finalist for the National Book Awards in 1969 for his volume of poetry, The Talking Girl and Other Poems, Pym-Randall Press, Cambridge, Mass., 1968.

== Publications ==
=== Collected poetry ===
The Talking Girl and Other Poems, Pym-Randall Press, Cambridge, Mass., 1968.

=== Poems ===
Thompson's poems were published in The Kenyon Review, Partisan Review, The New York Review of Books, Soundings, and Hudson Review.

=== Short stories ===
His short fiction appeared in The Kenyon Review, Harper's, Shenandoah (magazine), and Partisan Review.

=== Novel ===
Thompson's only novel, Things to Put Away, was published posthumously in 2018.

=== Nonfiction ===
Thompson published various essays and articles in The Kenyon Review, The New York Review of Books, Commentary, and Harper's. Between 1939 and 1981 he also published scores of book reviews in Poetry Magazine, The Kenyon Review, The New York Review of Books, Commentary, Harper's, The New York Times Book Review, Parnassus, Shenandoah (magazine), Partisan Review, Hudson Review, and The American Scholar (magazine).

=== Collected work ===
Two volumes of Thompson's collected work, including essays, stories, book reviews, as well as poems not appearing in The Talking Girl and Other Poems, were published posthumously in 2018 as Straws in the Wind: Collected Work, Volume I: 1938-1967 and Straws in the Wind: Collected Work, Volume II: 1968-1995.
