= John Edward Thompson =

American painter

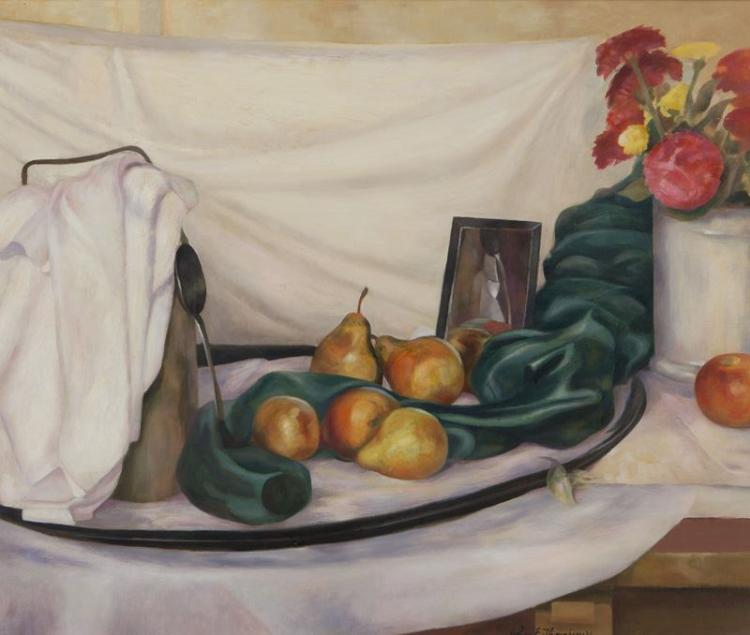

John Edward Thompson (1882–1945) was an American painter and university professor who is credited with introducing modern art to Denver, Colorado in 1917, much to the chagrin of local critics. Due to his pioneering career, Thompson was referred to as the "Dean of Colorado Painters." While he never enjoyed much national renown, his work is still among the most desirable to collectors of Colorado art.

== Overview ==
Born in Buffalo, New York, in 1882 , Thompson had begun his formal art studies with noted illustrator Lucius Hitchcock. After studying for two years at the Art Students League of New York, he enrolled in Paris' Académie Julian in 1902. Influenced by the tutelage of such renowned figures as Jean-Paul Laurens, he established a European reputation while still in his twenties. Spending a year in Laren, a famous painting village in the Netherlands, Thompson also met Jozef Israëls and Albert Neuhys. Returning to Paris, he found himself invited to the salon of Gertrude Stein and soon was living in the home of George Sand. In a picturesque French village, Gargilesse-Dampierre, Thompson was inspired by the natural light and scenery to paint landscapes in the style of Paul Cézanne.

Driven back to the United States by World War I, Thompson found himself drawn to depictions of the American West. A railroad agent recommended Pine, Colorado for its fine quality of mountain light, which was enough to send Thompson packing. He soon landed in Denver, drawing friends and artists such as Joseph Bakos and Walter Mruk to his own small art colony. Though some soon departed to form the Santa Fe community known as "Los Cinco Pintores," Thompson's leadership introduced modernist European styles to a region long-resistant to non-traditional art forms.

As a member of the Denver Atelier, an exclusive network of leaders in the arts and architecture community, Thompson also used the studio as a social gathering spot. Frederick Law Olmsted Jr, Jacques Benedict, Burnham Hoyt, and other Denver notables interested in the American Beaux-Arts tradition joined him. Their monthly meetings would often feature nude models, enabling members to practice sketching in a supportive environment while enjoying the pleasures of homemade juniper-berry wine.

Among Thompson's works are murals, including one on the University of Denver campus which was finished in 1929, painted over in 1931, and only rediscovered in 2007.

Thompson's genius led to exhibitions in some of the most prestigious art galleries in the country, including the Art Institute of Chicago, New York World's Fair, Philadelphia Sesqui-Centennial Exhibition, San Francisco's Palace of the Legion of Honor, and the Corcoran Museum of Art in Washington D.C.

Thompson worked at the University of Denver from 1929 until his death in 1945.
