= Jack Thompson (Australian footballer) =

Australian footballer

Personal information
- Full name: Walter John Thompson
- Born: 23 August 1927
- Died: 7 December 1961 (aged 34); Northcote, Victoria
- Original team: Richmond Sub-Districts
- Height: 185 cm (6 ft 1 in)
- Weight: 83 kg (183 lb)

Playing career^{1}
Years	Club	Games (Goals)
1948–51	Collingwood	51 (24)
- ^{1} Playing statistics correct to the end of 1951.

Jack Thompson (23 August 1927 – 7 December 1961) was an Australian rules footballer who played with Collingwood in the Victorian Football League (VFL).

He died after being shot by his de facto partner in December 1961.
