= John Thompson (judge) =

British barrister and judge

Sir John Thompson (16 December 1907 – 11 July 1995) was a British barrister and High Court judge from 1961 to 1982.

== Biography ==
Thompson was born in Glasgow, the eldest son of Donald Cameron Thompson and Jeanie Dunn Thompson (née Nisbet). He came from a modest background: his father was the head gardener of a large estate. He was educated at Bellahouston Academy, before proceeding to Glasgow University, where he graduated MA, winning the Arthur Jones Memorial Prize in 1928 and the Ewing Gold Medal in 1929. He then proceeded to Oriel College, Oxford, where he held the Neale Scholarship, graduating BA in 1930 and MA in 1943.

Called to the English Bar by the Middle Temple in 1933 (winning the Powell Prize the same year), Thompson built up a large practice in personal injury litigation, particularly in industrial injuries. The "doyen of the Personal Injury Bar", he edited (with Harold R. Rogers) several editions of Redgrave's Factories, Truck & Shops Acts. He was made a Queen's Counsel in 1954.

Thompson was vice-chairman of the General Council of the Bar from 1960 to 1961, having been a member since 1958. He was Commissioner of Assize at Birmingham in 1961. He was elected a Bencher of Middle Temple in 1961, was Lent Reader in 1977, Deputy Treasurer in 1977, and Treasurer in 1978.

In 1961, Thompson was appointed a Justice of the High Court and was assigned to the Queen's Bench Division, receiving the customary knighthood. He retired in 1982.

== Family ==
Thompson married in 1934 Agnes Baird, (Nancy), oldest of John and Jeanie Drummond, of Glasgow; they had two sons.
