= Jack Thomson (footballer, born 1929) =

Australian rules footballer

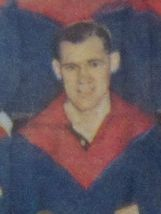

Personal information
- Full name: Jack Thomson
- Born: 25 January 1929
- Original team: Prahran Thirds
- Height: 185 cm (6 ft 1 in)
- Weight: 81 kg (179 lb)

Playing career^{1}
Years	Club	Games (Goals)
1949–53	Melbourne	64 (46)
- ^{1} Playing statistics correct to the end of 1953.

Jack Thomson (born 25 January 1929) is a former Australian rules footballer who played with Melbourne in the Victorian Football League.
