= Butch Joyner =

American basketball player (born 1945)

Personal information
- Born: April 26, 1945 (age 81)
- Listed height: 6 ft 5 in (1.96 m)
- Listed weight: 200 lb (91 kg)

Career information
- High school: New Castle (New Castle, Indiana)
- College: Indiana (1965–1968)
- NBA draft: 1968: 9th round, 111th overall pick
- Drafted by: Cincinnati Royals
- Position: Forward
- Number: 15

Career history
- 1969: Indiana Pacers
- Stats at Basketball Reference

Harry C. "Butch" Joyner (born April 26, 1945) is an American former professional basketball player. He played in the American Basketball Association (ABA) for the Indiana Pacers in two games in February 1969.
