= Phil Wagner =

American basketball player (born 1945)

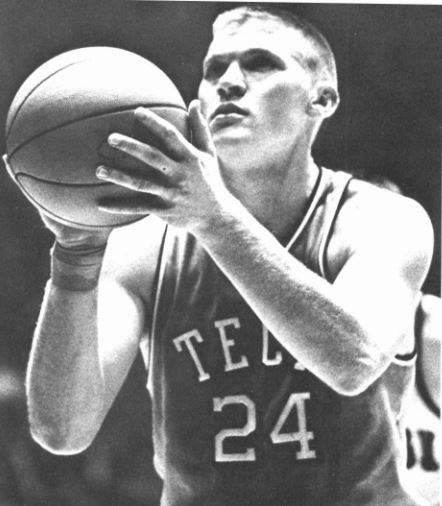
- Wagner as a sophomore at Georgia Tech

Personal information
- Born: December 18, 1945 (age 80) Cynthiana, Kentucky, U.S.
- Listed height: 6 ft 2 in (1.88 m)
- Listed weight: 190 lb (86 kg)

Career information
- High school: Harrison County (Cynthiana, Kentucky)
- College: Georgia Tech (1965–1968)
- NBA draft: 1968: 6th round, 75th overall pick
- Drafted by: Atlanta Hawks
- Position: Guard
- Number: 11

Career history
- 1968: Indiana Pacers
- Stats at Basketball Reference

Phillip Clay Wagner (born December 18, 1945) is an American former professional basketball player who spent one season in the American Basketball Association (ABA) for the Indiana Pacers during the 1968–69 season. He attended the Georgia Institute of Technology.

He lives in Stockbridge, Georgia with his wife Brenda. He is retired from Delta Air Lines, and is a real estate agent with Coldwell Banker in McDonough, Georgia. He has three living sons (one deceased son) and six grandsons.
