= Jay Miller (basketball) =

American basketball player (1943–2001)

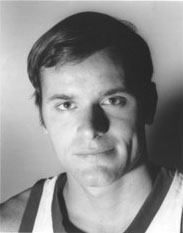
- Miller in 1968

Personal information
- Born: July 19, 1943 St. Louis, Missouri, U.S.
- Died: April 5, 2001 (aged 57) Tempe, Arizona, U.S.
- Listed height: 6 ft 5 in (1.96 m)
- Listed weight: 205 lb (93 kg)

Career information
- High school: Goshen (Goshen, Indiana)
- College: Notre Dame (1962–1965)
- NBA draft: 1965: undrafted
- Playing career: 1967–1970
- Position: Small forward
- Number: 44, 12, 14, 32

Career history
- 1967–1968: St. Louis Hawks
- 1968: Milwaukee Bucks
- 1969: Los Angeles Stars
- 1969–1970: Indiana Pacers

Career NBA/ABA statistics
- Points: 649
- Rebounds: 205
- Assists: 47
- Stats at NBA.com
- Stats at Basketball Reference

Jay Julian Miller (July 19, 1943 – April 5, 2001) was an American basketball player in the National Basketball Association (NBA) and American Basketball Association (ABA). Miller first played for the St. Louis Hawks before being selected by the Milwaukee Bucks in the 1968 NBA expansion draft. After his time with the Bucks, he spent the rest of his career in the ABA, with the Los Angeles Stars and Indiana Pacers.

== Career statistics ==
Legend
GP	Games played	GS	Games started	MPG	Minutes per game
FG%	Field goal percentage	3P%	3-point field goal percentage	FT%	Free throw percentage
RPG	Rebounds per game	APG	Assists per game	SPG	Steals per game
BPG	Blocks per game	PPG	Points per game	**Bold**	Career high

†	Denotes seasons in which Miller's team won an ABA championship

=== NBA/ABA ===
==== Regular season ====
Year	Team	GP	MPG	FG%	3P%	FT%	RPG	APG	PPG
1967–68	St. Louis (NBA)	8	6.5	.258		.571	.9	.1	2.5
1968–69	Milwaukee (NBA)	3	9.0	.200		.714	.7	.0	3.0
1968–69	L.A. Stars (ABA)	11	**22.5**	.346	–	**.781**	**2.9**	**.8**	**12.5**
1968–69	Indiana (ABA)	41	12.0	.450	–	.688	2.0	.5	6.9
1969–70†	Indiana (ABA)	**52**	8.0	.449	.000	.719	1.5	.3	3.7
1970–71	Indiana (ABA)	2	4.5	**.800**	–	–	1.5	.5	4.0
Career (NBA)		11	7.2	.244		.643	.8	.1	2.6
Career (ABA)		106	11.0	.428	.000	.721	1.8	.4	5.8
Career (overall)		117	10.6	.415	.000	.717	1.8	.4	5.5

==== Playoffs ====
Year	Team	GP	MPG	FG%	3P%	FT%	RPG	APG	PPG
1969	Indiana (ABA)	**11**	**5.6**	**.455**	–	**.400**	**1.9**	**.2**	**3.1**
1970†	Denver (ABA)	3	3.3	.200	–	–	1.3	.0	.7
Career		14	5.1	.421	–	.400	1.8	.1	2.6
