= Bobby Hooper (basketball) =

American basketball player (1946–2024)

Personal information
- Born: December 22, 1946 Lees Creek, Ohio, U.S.
- Died: May 9, 2024 (aged 77) Chillicothe, Ohio, U.S.
- Listed height: 6 ft 0 in (1.83 m)
- Listed weight: 180 lb (82 kg)

Career information
- High school: Simon Kenton (Lees Creek, Ohio)
- College: Dayton (1965–1968)
- NBA draft: 1968: 8th round, 100th overall pick
- Drafted by: New York Knicks
- Position: Point guard
- Number: 12, 20

Career history
- 1968–1969: Indiana Pacers
- Stats at Basketball Reference

Bobby Joe Hooper (December 22, 1946 – May 9, 2024) was an American professional basketball player who spent one season in the American Basketball Association (ABA) as a member of the Indiana Pacers. He was drafted out of University of Dayton by the New York Knicks in the eighth round of the 1968 NBA draft, but did not play for them.

== High school ==
Hooper graduated from Simon Kenton High School in Lees Creek, Ohio.

== University of Dayton ==
Hooper was a three-year letter-winner and starter for the Dayton Flyers.

He played as a junior point guard for the 1966–67 Dayton Flyers team that played in the NCAA Basketball Championship game. Hooper's shot with four seconds left to defeat Western Kentucky in the first round was called the second greatest last-second shot in Dayton history. They defeated North Carolina Tar Heels men's basketball 76–62 in the national semifinal game before losing to UCLA, 79–64. In the championship game, Hooper tallied 6 points, 5 rebounds and 2 assists.

With Hooper as their point guard, the Flyers reached the NCAA Sweet 16 in 1965–66, and the NIT championship game in 1967–68. He scored 1,059 career points, and set school records (since surpassed) in consecutive free throws made with 34 and career free throw percentage at .835.

He was named to the 1967 All-Mideast regional team and the 1968 All-NIT team.

Hooper was elected to the University of Dayton Athletic Hall of Fame in 1989. He was also named to UD's All-Century team in 2004.

== Indiana Pacers ==
Hooper played professionally for one season in the American Basketball Association (ABA). He was in 54 games, averaging 5.0 points, 2.6 assists and 2 rebounds per game. He suffered a broken hand in February 1969 that hindered him the rest of the year. He averaged 17.7 minutes per game. In the ABA playoffs, he played in 16 games, averaging 4.8 points, 2.8 assists and 2.4 rebounds per game.

His high-point game in the regular season was 14 against the Oakland Oaks; his high game in the playoffs was 15, also against Oakland.

== Later life ==
Hooper retired after the season and joined Don Donoher’s staff as a part-time assistant coach at Dayton, becoming a full-time assistant the following year. He later served as an assistant coach with the Pacers. He suffered a breakdown in the mid 1970s but recovered.

He found his faith in 1980 and decided to go back to school to finish his degree at Dayton. Hooper worked as a coach and teacher at Clinton-Massie High School. Devoutly religious, he became a pastor in the 1980s. He was an assistant pastor at the Marshall Road First Church of God in Kettering. He also volunteered for Hospice of Clinton County and Ross County.

== Death ==
Hooper died on May 9, 2024, at the age of 77.
