= Don Dee =

American basketball player (1943–2014)

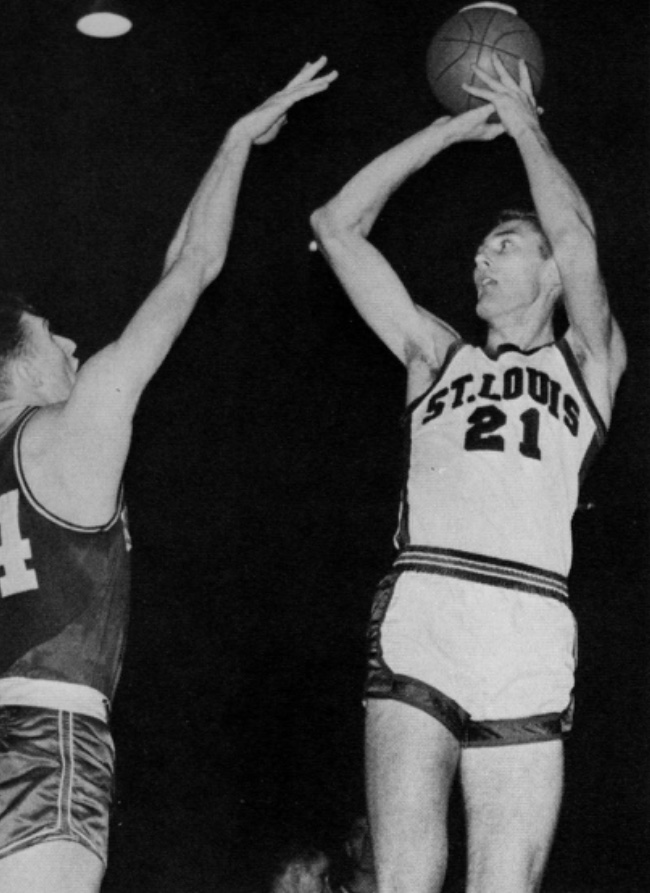
- Dee from the 1964 Archive

Personal information
- Born: August 9, 1943 Boonville, Missouri, U.S.
- Died: November 26, 2014 (aged 71) North Kansas City, Missouri, U.S.
- Listed height: 6 ft 8 in (2.03 m)
- Listed weight: 210 lb (95 kg)

Career information
- High school: Bishop Lillis (Kansas City, Missouri)
- College: Saint Louis University (1962–1964); St. Mary of the Plains (1966–1968)
- NBA draft: 1968: 3rd round, 25th overall pick
- Drafted by: Detroit Pistons
- Position: Power forward
- Number: 40

Career history
- 1968–1969: Indiana Pacers
- Stats at Basketball Reference
Medals
Men's basketball
Representing the United States
Olympic Games
| Gold medal – first place | 1968 Mexico City | Team competition |

Donald Francis Dee (August 9, 1943 – November 26, 2014) was an American basketball player. He played college basketball for Saint Louis University and St. Mary of the Plains College. Dee played his sophomore year and the first two games of his junior year at Saint Louis University before a serious injury during the second game he played in during his junior year at Saint Louis University caused him to miss out on what would have been his final two years there, which caused him to later transfer to St. Mary of the Plains College for what would officially become his junior and senior years of college instead.

Dee participated in the 1968 Summer Olympics, where he won a gold medal with the United States national basketball team. He then played professionally with the Indiana Pacers of the American Basketball Association, averaging 5.7 points per game during the 1968–69 ABA season.

Dee's son, Donnie Dee, played for the Indianapolis Colts in the NFL for two seasons. His grandson Johnny Dee is a professional basketball player.

Dee died on November 26, 2014, in North Kansas City, Missouri, at the age of 71.
