= Jack Thompson (basketball) =

American basketball player

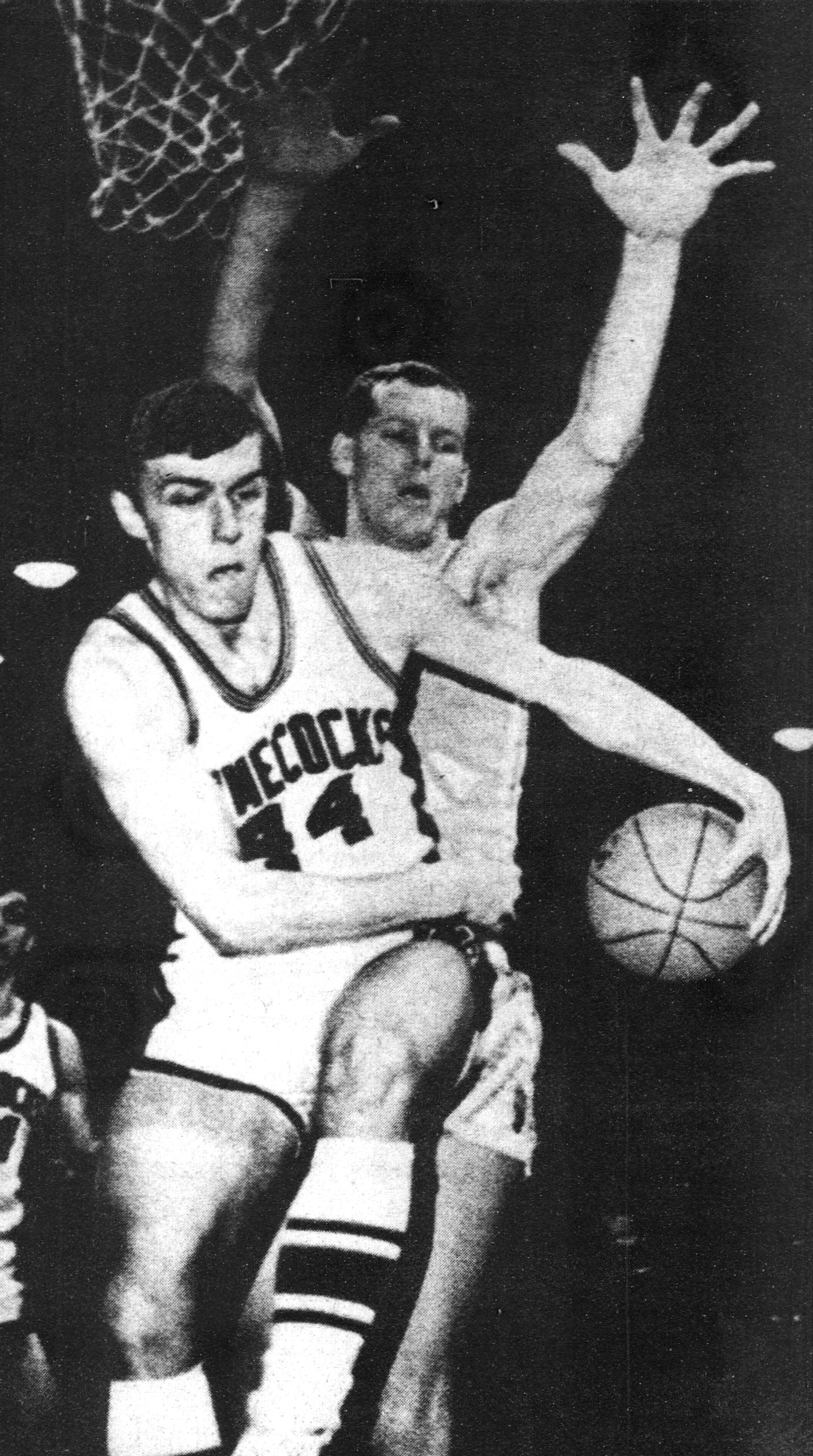
- Thompson (number 44) is guarded by North Carolina Tar Heels center Rusty Clark on March 1, 1967.

Personal information
- Born: March 26, 1946 (age 80) New York City, New York, U.S.
- Listed height: 6 ft 1 in (1.85 m)
- Listed weight: 185 lb (84 kg)

Career information
- High school: Adelphi Academy (Brooklyn, New York)
- College: South Carolina (1965–1968)
- NBA draft: 1968: 3rd round, 33rd overall pick
- Drafted by: Baltimore Bullets
- Position: Point guard
- Number: 12

Career history
- 1968: Indiana Pacers

Career highlights
- Second-team All-ACC (1967)
- Stats at Basketball Reference

John Sigred Thompson (born March 26, 1946) is an American retired professional basketball player. He played for the Indiana Pacers in two games during the 1968–69 American Basketball Association season. He recorded totals of two points, two assists, and one rebound.
