= 1967–68 Houston Mavericks season =

ABA basketball team season

- Head coach: Slater Martin
- Owner(s): William Whitmore; Charles Frazier; Cloyce Box (original owners); T.C. Morrow (new majority owner); Bud Adams (minority)
- Arena: Sam Houston Coliseum

Results
- Record: 29–49 (.372)
- Place: Division: 4th (Western)
- Playoff finish: Lost in the Division semifinals
- Radio: KNUZ

The 1967–68 Houston Mavericks season was the first season of the Mavericks in the American Basketball Association. On February 2, 1967, Houston was awarded a franchise for $30,000 with William Whitmore, Charles Frazier and Cloyce Box being the buyers. Later that year, T.C. Morrow and Bud Adams, owner of a Houston-based oil company and the American Football League's Houston Oilers bought Box's interest in the team. Morrow would be majority owner while Adams was a minority owner. The team had less than stellar attendance, with 3,091 attending the first ever game versus the Chaparrals on October 23, 1967 (losing 100–83). The lowest attended game was held on February 5, 1968, when only 575 people attended. The highest attended game was on February 29, 1968, with 4,965 attendance. Despite all of this, the Mavericks spiraled into the playoffs, in part due to 8 of the 11 teams in the new league being guaranteed a spot into the Playoffs, with Houston getting the final spot by 4 games. In the Semifinals, they were swept by the Dallas Chaparrals in 3 games. This was their only playoff appearance in their two-year history.

== Roster ==
1967–68 Houston Mavericks roster
Players

Pos.	No.	Player	Height	Weight	DOB	From
PF	34	Art Becker	6 ft 7 in (2.01 m)	205 lb (93 kg)	January 12, 1942	Arizona State
PF	24	Wilbert Frazier	6 ft 7 in (2.01 m)	210 lb (95 kg)	August 25, 1942	Grambling State
PG	20	Hal Hale	6 ft 1 in (1.85 m)	180 lb (82 kg)	September 21, 1945	Utah State
SG	22	Joe Hamood	6 ft 0 in (1.83 m)	180 lb (82 kg)	September 7, 1943	Houston
F	44	Darrell Hardy	6 ft 7 in (2.01 m)	220 lb (100 kg)	1944	Baylor
SF	35	Leary Lentz	6 ft 6 in (1.98 m)	200 lb (91 kg)	February 23, 1945	Houston
SF	31	Guy Manning	6 ft 6 in (1.98 m)	195 lb (88 kg)	February 4, 1944	Prairie View A&M
C	14	DeWitt Menyard	6 ft 10 in (2.08 m)	210 lb (95 kg)	May 24, 1944	Utah
C	44	Wayne Molis	6 ft 8 in (2.03 m)	230 lb (104 kg)	April 17, 1943	Lewis (IL)
SG	21	Jerry Pettway	6 ft 3 in (1.91 m)	185 lb (84 kg)	February 13, 1944	Northwood
PF	15	Bob Riedy	6 ft 6 in (1.98 m)	215 lb (98 kg)	August 26, 1945	Duke
PG	25	Roger Schurig	6 ft 3 in (1.91 m)	185 lb (84 kg)	April 3, 1942	Vanderbilt
PG	12	Willie Somerset	5 ft 8 in (1.73 m)	170 lb (77 kg)	March 17, 1942	Duquesne
F		Gary Turner	6 ft 7 in (2.01 m)	200 lb (91 kg)	November 23, 1942	TCU

Coaches
Head coach
- Slater Martin

Legend
- (DP) Unsigned draft pick
- (FA) Free agent
- (S) Suspended
- Injured

Roster

== Final standings ==
=== Western Division ===
Team	W	L	PCT.	GB
New Orleans Buccaneers	48	30	.615	–
Dallas Chaparrals	46	32	.590	2
Denver Rockets	45	33	.577	3
Houston Mavericks	29	49	.372	19
Anaheim Amigos	25	53	.321	23
Oakland Oaks	22	56	.282	26

== ABA Playoffs ==
1968 playoff game log
ABA Western Division Semifinals: 0–3 (home: 0–1; road: 0–2)

Game	Date	Team	Score	High points	High rebounds	High assists	Location Attendance	Series
1	March 25	@ Dallas	L 110–111	Willie Somerset 42	Willie Somerset 11		Moody Coliseum; 1,857	0–1
2	March 25	Dallas	L 97–115	Willie Somerset (40)			Sam Houston Coliseum; 891	0–2
3	March 26	@ Dallas	L 103–116	Art Becker (26)	Art Becker (10)		Moody Coliseum; 3,117	0–3

1968 schedule

== Awards and honors ==
1968 ABA All-Star Game selections (game played on January 9, 1968)

- Art Becker
- DeWitt Menyard
