= 1968–69 Houston Mavericks season =

ABA basketball team season

- Head coach: Slater Martin (3-9); Jim Weaver (20-46)
- Owner(s): T.C. Morrow (original owner); James Carson Gardner (new majority owner); Bud Adams (minority owner)
- Arena: Sam Houston Coliseum

Results
- Record: 23–55 (.295)
- Place: Division: 6th (Western)

The 1968–69 Houston Mavericks season was the second and final season of the Mavericks in the American Basketball Association. By this point, attendance were at all-time lows at home for the Mavericks, who trudged to finish dead last in a much improved Division, 18 games behind the 4th place Dallas Chaparrals. T.C. Morrow announced to the league that he would not put any more money into the team midway through the year, and the league stepped in to make sure the team did not fold midway through, making trades and such. In January 1969, Jim Gardner agreed to buy the team for $650,000 to move them to North Carolina, which would occur after the season. One bright spot was their performance on January 17, 1969, when the team made 36 of 36 free throws in a 130–118 victory over the New York Nets. April 2, 1969 was the final game in Houston, with a reported attendance of 89, though the Mavericks beat the New York Nets 149–132. The next night, in their final ever game (versus the Dallas Chaparrals), they lost 136–144. The team lived on in Carolina, playing as a regional team. Houston would not have a pro basketball team until 1971, with the Houston Rockets.

== Roster ==
1968–69 Houston Mavericks roster
Players

Pos.	No.	Player	Height	Weight	DOB	From
PF	34	Art Becker	6 ft 7 in (2.01 m)	205 lb (93 kg)	January 12, 1942	Arizona State
PG	25	Spider Bennett	6 ft 3 in (1.91 m)	190 lb (86 kg)	August 4, 1943	Winston-Salem State
C	52	Larry Bunce	7 ft 0 in (2.13 m)	240 lb (109 kg)	1945-07-29	Utah State
SG	14	Don Carlos	6 ft 5 in (1.96 m)	210 lb (95 kg)	December 15, 1944	Otterbein
PG	23	Dick Clark	6 ft 4 in (1.93 m)	190 lb (86 kg)	January 5, 1944	Eastern Kentucky
G	25	Rich Dumas	6 ft 5 in (1.96 m)	170 lb (77 kg)	April 21, 1944	Northeastern State
G	15	Bill Gaines	6 ft 4 in (1.93 m)	185 lb (84 kg)	March 10, 1946	East Texas A&M
C	24	Tom Hoover	6 ft 9 in (2.06 m)	230 lb (104 kg)	January 23, 1941	Villanova
G	25	Tony Jackson	6 ft 4 in (1.93 m)	200 lb (91 kg)	1942-11-07	St. John's
PF	13	Stew Johnson	6 ft 8 in (2.03 m)	220 lb (100 kg)	August 19, 1944	Murray State
C	52	Tom Kondla	6 ft 8 in (2.03 m)	225 lb (102 kg)	November 30, 1946	Minnesota
SG	32	Steve Kramer	6 ft 5 in (1.96 m)	200 lb (91 kg)	1945-01-01	BYU
SF	35	Leary Lentz	6 ft 6 in (1.98 m)	200 lb (91 kg)	February 23, 1945	Houston
SF	31	Guy Manning	6 ft 6 in (1.98 m)	195 lb (88 kg)	February 4, 1944	Prairie View A&M
SG	21	Jerry Pettway	6 ft 3 in (1.91 m)	185 lb (84 kg)	February 13, 1944	Northwood
PF	30	Willie Porter	6 ft 7 in (2.01 m)	205 lb (93 kg)	July 3, 1941	Tennessee State
C	14, 41	Kendall Rhine	6 ft 10 in (2.08 m)	230 lb (104 kg)	February 13, 1943	Rice
PG	12	Willie Somerset	5 ft 8 in (1.73 m)	170 lb (77 kg)	March 17, 1942	Duquesne
PF	32	Keith Swagerty	6 ft 7 in (2.01 m)	235 lb (107 kg)	October 30, 1945	Pacific
SG	34	Levern Tart	6 ft 2 in (1.88 m)	195 lb (88 kg)	June 1, 1942	Bradley
SG	27	Bob Verga	6 ft 1 in (1.85 m)	190 lb (86 kg)	1945-09-07	Duke
PF	11	Hank Whitney	6 ft 7 in (2.01 m)	230 lb (104 kg)	1939-04-28	Iowa State

Coaches
Head coach
- Slater Martin
- Jim Weaver

Legend
- (DP) Unsigned draft pick
- (FA) Free agent
- (S) Suspended
- Injured

Roster

== Final standings ==
=== Western Division ===
Team	W	L	PCT.	GB
Oakland Oaks C	60	18	.769	-
New Orleans Buccaneers	46	32	.590	14
Denver Rockets	44	34	.564	16
Dallas Chaparrals	41	37	.526	19
Los Angeles Stars	33	45	.423	27
Houston Mavericks	23	55	.295	37

C - ABA Champions

== Awards and honors ==
1969 ABA All-Star Game selections (game played on January 28, 1969)

- Willie Somerset
