= Wilbert Frazier =

American basketball player

Personal information
- Born: August 24, 1942 Minden, Louisiana, U.S.
- Died: January 19, 2018 (aged 75)
- Listed height: 6 ft 7 in (2.01 m)
- Listed weight: 210 lb (95 kg)

Career information
- High school: Minden (Minden, Louisiana)
- College: Grambling State (1961–1965)
- NBA draft: 1965: 2nd round, 9th overall pick
- Drafted by: San Francisco Warriors
- Playing career: 1965–1970
- Position: Power forward / center
- Number: 24, 30

Career history
- 1965: San Francisco Warriors
- 1965–1966: New Haven Elms
- 1966–1967: Harrisburg Patriots
- 1967–1968: Houston Mavericks
- 1968–1969: New York Nets
- 1969–1970: Hartford Capitols

Career highlights
- 3× First-team All-SWAC (1963–1965)

Career NBA and ABA statistics
- Points: 1,500 (9.8 ppg)
- Rebounds: 1,087 (7.1 rpg)
- Assists: 171 (1.1 apg)
- Stats at NBA.com
- Stats at Basketball Reference

Wilbert Bennie Frazier (born August 24, 1942 – January 19, 2018) was an American professional basketball player. Frazier played college basketball for the Grambling State Tigers where he was a first-team All-Southwestern Athletic Conference (SWAC) selection from 1963 to 1965.

== Professional career ==
Frazier was drafted by the San Francisco Warriors in second round of the 1965 NBA draft with the 12th overall draft pick. He appeared in two games for the Warriors.

Frazier spent the following two seasons playing in the Eastern Professional Basketball League for the New Haven Elms and the Harrisburg Patriots.

In 1967, he joined the Houston Mavericks of the American Basketball Association. He was their third leading scorer for the 1967–68 season, averaging 12.4 points along with 8.8 rebounds per game. Following the season, he was traded to the Kentucky Colonels for Kendall Rhine. In October 1968, he was again traded, this time to the New York Nets for DeWitt Menyard. He played one season for the Nets and was waived in October the following year.

== Career statistics ==
Legend
GP	Games played	GS	Games started	MPG	Minutes per game
FG%	Field goal percentage	3P%	3-point field goal percentage	FT%	Free throw percentage
RPG	Rebounds per game	APG	Assists per game	SPG	Steals per game
BPG	Blocks per game	PPG	Points per game	**Bold**	Career high

=== NBA/ABA ===
==== Regular season ====
Year	Team	GP	MPG	FG%	3P%	FT%	RPG	APG	PPG
1965–66	San Francisco	2	4.5	.000		.500	2.5	.5	.5
1967–68	Houston (ABA)	**76**	**28.0**	.411	**.500**	.606	**8.8**	**1.4**	**12.4**
1968–69	N.Y. Nets (ABA)	75	18.3	**.424**	–	**.619**	5.5	.9	7.4
Career (ABA)		151	23.1	.416	.500	.611	7.2	1.1	9.9
Career (overall)		153	22.9	.415	.500	.610	7.1	1.1	9.8

==== Playoffs ====
Year	Team	GP	MPG	FG%	3P%	FT%	RPG	APG	PPG
1968	Houston (ABA)	3	28.3	.448	.000	.429	4.0	1.3	9.7
