= Tom Hoover (basketball) =

American basketball player

Personal information
- Born: January 23, 1941 (age 85) Washington, D.C., U.S.
- Listed height: 6 ft 9 in (2.06 m)
- Listed weight: 230 lb (104 kg)

Career information
- High school: Archbishop Carroll (Washington, D.C.)
- College: Villanova (1960–1961)
- NBA draft: 1963: 1st round, 6th overall pick
- Drafted by: Syracuse Nationals
- Playing career: 1962–1970
- Position: Center
- Number: 23, 12, 24, 41, 10

Career history
- 1962–1963: Camden Bullets
- 1963–1965: New York Knicks
- 1965–1967: Wilmington Blue Bombers
- 1967: St. Louis Hawks
- 1967–1968: Denver Rockets
- 1968: Houston Mavericks
- 1968: Minnesota Pipers
- 1968–1969: New York Nets
- 1969–1970: Wilmington Blue Bombers

Career highlights
- 2× EPBL champion (1966, 1967); First-team Parade All-American (1959)

Career NBA and ABA statistics
- Points: 1,311 (5.9 ppg)
- Rebounds: 1,388 (6.2 rpg)
- Assists: 237 (1.1 apg)
- Stats at NBA.com
- Stats at Basketball Reference

Thomas Lee Hoover Jr. (born January 23, 1941) is an American former professional basketball player. A 6 ft 9 in (2.06 m) forward/center, Hoover played in the National Basketball Association (NBA) from 1963 to 1967 as a member of the New York Knicks, Los Angeles Lakers, and St. Louis Hawks. From 1967 to 1969 he played in the American Basketball Association (ABA) for the Denver Rockets, Houston Mavericks, Minnesota Pipers, and New York Nets. He played all or parts of five seasons in the Eastern Professional Basketball League, winning two league championships.

== Early life ==
Hoover was born on January 23, 1941, in Washington, D.C. He attended Archbishop Carroll High School in Washington. Hoover played on the school's basketball team, where his teammates included, among others, future Naismith Basketball Hall of Fame coach John Thompson, and Edward "Monk" Malloy who would become a Catholic priest and later president of the University of Notre Dame.

In March 1958, as a junior, the 6 ft 8 in (2.03 m) Hoover was a key player in leading Archbishop Carroll to the Eastern States Catholic Invitational Tournament (ESCIT) championship over All Hallows High School of New York. Hoover had 15 points and 15 rebounds in the championship game. He was named the 1958 ESCIT's most outstanding player, and was selected to the first-team all-tournament team.

As a senior (1958–59), the 6 ft 8 in 247 lb (112 kg) Hoover was selected as a first-team Parade All American. The Parade magazine article announcing his selection said "he was probably the best high school rebounder in the" United States. Archbishop Carroll won the ESCIT championship again in April 1959, defeating Trenton Catholic High School in the championship game; Hoover's play on both offense and defense in the fourth quarter of that game being critical to Carroll's victory. In the 1959 semifinal win over All Hallows, Hoover had 30 rebounds and 22 points.

In 1959, Hoover led all ESCIT tournament players in rebounding and field goal percentage. He was selected to the first-team ESCIT all-tournament team, and came in second in the voting for the tournament's most outstanding player to teammate George Leftwich (who had been second to Hoover in 1958).

The 1959 ESCIT championship game win was Carroll's 33rd consecutive victory over high school opponents (its only losses being to two college freshman teams that season). In addition to the ESCIT title, the 1958–59 Carroll team won the Baltimore-Washington Catholic League, Metropolitan Washington League and City championships, and was the winner of the Washington Knights of Columbus tournament. In March 2001, Archbishop Carroll inducted the school's 1958–59 and 1959–60 basketball teams into its Hall of Honor. Hoover was among 25 alumni inducted that year (along with Thompson and Leftwich, among others). As a high school player, Hoover was "one of the first who was said to play the game 'above the rim'".

== College career ==
Over 75 colleges pursued Hoover about playing basketball at their institutions. Hoover chose to attend Villanova University, after being recruited by Villanova head basketball coach Al Severance and Villanova player George Raveling (who would go on to become a top college recruiter, and a college head coach for over 20 years). Hoover played on its basketball team. As a sophomore (1960–61), the 6 ft 9 in (2.06 m) Hoover was the tallest basketball player in school history. That season, he averaged 6.4 point and 9.3 rebounds per game.

Hoover had failing grades in early 1961, and did not finish the 1960–61 Wildcats' season. He ultimately left Villanova in 1961. He is not listed on the school's 1961–62 player roster.

== Professional career ==
=== Camden Bullets ===
In 1962–63, Hoover played center for the Camden Bullets of the Eastern Professional Basketball League (Eastern League). George Raveling and Paul Arizin were among his teammates. Hoover played all 28 of the Camden Bullets games that season, averaging 13.4 rebounds and 11.5 points per game. He was called the "finest defensive player in the Eastern League".

=== NBA and Wilmington Blue Bombers ===
After becoming eligible for the NBA draft, in late April 1963 Hoover was selected by the Syracuse Nationals in the first round of the 1963 NBA draft (seventh overall). Less than a month later, the team was sold and became the Philadelphia 76ers. Hoover had a salary dispute with the 76ers and originally did not report to training camp. He was offered a tryout with the Harlem Globetrotters and did not find their salary offer agreeable. He returned to the 76ers, who released Hoover on October 10, 1963, before the season started. Less than 10 days later, he was signed by the New York Knicks.

Hoover was a reserve center on the 1963–64 New York Knicks. He played in 59 games, averaging 16.7 minutes, 4.8 points and 5.6 rebounds per game. In his first NBA game, Hoover had 16 points and 17 rebounds in 32 minutes, playing against a St. Louis Hawks team that had future Hall of Fame power forward Bob Pettit and future Hall of Fame center Zelmo Beatty.

Hoover began the 1964–65 season with the Knicks. He was released on January 1, 1965, and subsequently rejoined the team for a week at the end of January, due to Len Chappell's injury. Hoover played four games at the end of January 1965. He was released again so he could seek a position with another team. In total, Hoover played in 24 games for the Knicks that season, his last game being on January 31, 1965. He averaged 1.4 points and 2.4 rebounds per game.

After his initial release by the Knicks, Hoover joined the Eastern League's Wilmington Blue Bombers in early January 1965. He returned to the Blue Bombers again after the Knicks released him a second time. Hoover had a number of options in the Eastern League, but chose Wilmington because of coach Neil Johnston. Overall in 1965, he played in 11 games for the Blue Bombers, averaging 13.4 points and 10.1 rebounds per game. He played the full 1965–66 season with the Blue Bombers, at center, averaging 10 points and 9.6 rebounds per game. The Blue Bombers were Eastern League champions that season.

It is reported that Hoover signed with the Los Angeles Lakers in early February 1966, and that the Lakers assigned him to the Blue Bombers. While Hoover did not play in the 1965–66 NBA regular season, the Lakers brought him onto their team for the playoffs in 1966. Hoover appeared in three playoff games for the Lakers. He was inserted at the end Game 2 of the 1966 NBA finals against the Boston Celtics; playing six minutes, with four points and two rebounds. During the game's final minute, Boston coach Red Auerbach substituted Hoover's former high school teammate John Thompson into the game, and the two played against each other at center.

The Lakers released Hoover in October 1966, and he was signed by the St. Louis Hawks in mid-November 1966. He played in 17 games for the Hawks as a backup center; his last game being January 8, 1967. He averaged 7.6 minutes, 1.8 points and 2.1 rebounds per game. He returned to the Blue Bombers for 13 games at the end of the 1966–67 season, averaging 10.7 points and ten rebounds per game, and helped the Blue Bombers to their second consecutive Eastern League championship.

== American Basketball Association ==
In mid-September 1967, Hoover signed with the Denver Rockets of the American Basketball Association (ABA). Hoover played in 70 games that season (1967–68), averaging 22.7 minutes, 6.5 points and seven rebounds per game. In May 1968, the Houston Mavericks purchased Hoover's contract rights from Denver. He played in only four games for the Mavericks in 1968, before being traded to the Minnesota Pipers for Willie Porter in late November 1968. He played in only nine games for the Pipers before being waived on December 24. He was signed by the New York Nets less than a week later. The Nets had traded starting center Manny Leaks that same week, and Hoover became the team's starting center, averaging 31.4 minutes, 11 points and 10.3 rebounds per game over 40 games with the Nets.

The Nets waived Hoover in mid-September 1969, and he did not play in the ABA or NBA again. He played 15 games for the Blue Bombers in the 1969–70 season, averaging 9.3 points and 6.6 rebounds per game.

Over his NBA/ABA career, Hoover averaged 5.9 points and 6.2 rebounds per game.

=== Reputation as player ===
Hoover reportedly had an aggressive and menacing style of play on the court, with a powerful physique; while off the court he was gracious and cordial. He had been referred to as a "bad boy" during his career. Hoover reportedly received the nickname "bad boy" as early as the summer of 1960, playing summer basketball in Philadelphia before his sophomore season at Villanova. He once was reportedly charged with a technical foul during an intrasquad game with the Los Angeles Lakers in 1966. Hoover once described himself as having a "roughneck" reputation, which he wanted to reform later in his career (1967) "'to erase the hatchet-man stigma" he had acquired.

Hoover had developed his reputation early in his career, as a rookie with the Knicks. In a January 1964 game against the Los Angeles Lakers, the Knicks' Billy McGill and Lakers' Jim Krebs began exchanging punches on the court near the game's end. All of the players from both teams wound up on the court brawling among each other, and the referees had to call in the police to stop the fighting. Hoover had paired off with the Lakers' Don Nelson (a future Hall of Fame coach), and punched Nelson in the mouth, resulting in an injury that required stitches.

In an early March 1964 game in Baltimore, Hoover and Terry Dischinger of the Baltimore Bullets got into a fight, until they were separated by the Bullets' Walt Bellamy. Each was fined $50 by NBA commissioner Walter Kennedy for fighting during a game. A Baltimore fan alleged that as Hoover was leaving the playing floor during that game, he brushed up against Hoover who punched the fan in the face, breaking various bones. In media coverage at the time, Hoover was called the "heir apparent to Jim Luscutoff's National Basketball Association 'Bad Boy' crown".

== Personal life ==
Since his basketball career ended, Hoover has worked in a wide variety of fields. With former NFL player Lane Howell, he ran an employment program for teenagers in New York City. Afterward, he turned to the entertainment industry, and worked as a road manager for Richard Pryor, The Spinners and Natalie Cole. He managed singer James "D-Train" Williams. He worked in night clubs, billing himself as "'the world's tallest stand-up comic'". He had a brief career acting in television commercials, then channeled his interest in boxing into a job with the New York State Athletic Commission. He later ran the Adopt-A-School Program in New York City.

== Career statistics ==
Legend
GP	Games played	GS	Games started	MPG	Minutes per game
FG%	Field goal percentage	3P%	3-point field goal percentage	FT%	Free throw percentage
RPG	Rebounds per game	APG	Assists per game	SPG	Steals per game
BPG	Blocks per game	PPG	Points per game	**Bold**	Career high

=== NBA/ABA ===
==== Regular season ====
Year	Team	GP	MPG	FG%	3P%	FT%	RPG	APG	PPG
1963–64	N.Y. Knicks	59	16.7	.413		.614	5.6	.6	4.8
1964–65	N.Y. Knicks	24	6.4	.406		.571	2.4	.5	1.4
1966–67	St. Louis	17	7.6	.419		.385	2.1	.5	1.8
1967–68	Denver (ABA)	**70**	22.7	.451	**.400**	.621	7.0	.9	6.5
1968–69	Houston (ABA)	4	20.0	**.500**	–	**.833**	7.5	1.3	8.3
1968–69	Minnesota (ABA)	9	9.2	.462	–	.476	3.4	.7	3.8
1968–69	N.Y. Nets (ABA)	40	**31.4**	.466	.000	.679	**10.3**	**2.7**	**11.0**
Career (NBA)		100	12.7	.413		.591	4.3	.6	3.5
Career (ABA)		123	24.4	.460	.333	.641	7.8	1.5	7.8
Career (overall)		223	19.2	.447	.333	.626	6.2	1.1	5.9

==== Playoffs ====
Year	Team	GP	MPG	FG%	3P%	FT%	RPG	APG	PPG
1966	L.A. Lakers	**4**	2.8	**.667**		–	.8	.3	1.0
1968	Denver (ABA)	2	**8.0**	.571	–	**.714**	**2.0**	**.5**	**6.5**
Career		6	4.5	.600	–	.714	1.2	.3	2.8
