= 1968–69 New York Nets season =

ABA basketball team season

- Head coach: Max Zaslofsky
- Arena: Long Island Arena

Results
- Record: 17–61 (.218)
- Place: Division: 5th (Eastern (ABA))
- Playoff finish: Did not qualify
- Stats at Basketball Reference
- Radio: WBAB

The 1968–69 New York Nets season was the first season of the Nets playing in New York and second overall season in the American Basketball Association (ABA). After one year in New Jersey as the New Jersey Americans, the team elected to play their games at Commack Arena in New York, the same place that they had tried to use for their one-game playoff against the Kentucky Colonels that they forfeited due to unplayable conditions. Low attendance plagued the team at times, with the October 29 game drawing only 384 people to see the Nets play the Denver Rockets. Only 249 attended the game played on December 25, 1968, which was also against the Rockets. The December 27 game was notable for a collision between Ken Wilburn and Rick Barry that cost Barry the rest of his season for the Oakland Oaks due to injury (though the Oaks would win the 1969 ABA Finals Championship despite Barry's injury). Factors for the low attendance ranged from a lack of star power to the conditioning of the court, which was over the hockey rink that was involved with the venue due to the Arena doubling as a hockey arena as well. Their 17–61 record would be the worst record in ABA history at the time (in terms of win percentage) until the 1974–75 Virginia Squires season broke that record.

== ABA Draft ==
Player	School/Club team
Dick Cunningham	Murray State
Rodney Knowles	Davidson
Don Smith	Iowa State
Steve Adelman	Boston College
Eddie Biedenbach	North Carolina State
Ron Gruziak	Duquesne
Pete ODea	St. Peter's
Bill Soens	Miami (FL)
Bill Butler	St. Bonaventure
John Chamberlain	C. W. Post
Tony Koski	Providence
Bill Langheld	Fordham
Art Stephenson	Rhode Island
Harry Laurie	St. Peter's

This draft would be the last draft the New York Nets would operate under their original New Jersey Americans team name, as they would move operations and rename themselves into the New York Nets for this season following a failed tiebreaker playoff game from the previous season against the Kentucky Colonels.

== Roster ==
1968–69 New York Nets roster
Players

Pos.	No.	Player	Height	Weight	DOB	From
C	20	Dan Anderson	6 ft 10 in (2.08 m)	230 lb (104 kg)	1943-02-15	Augsburg
PF	32	Tom Bowens	6 ft 8 in (2.03 m)	220 lb (100 kg)	1940-07-07	Grambling State
SG	22	Steve Chubin	6 ft 2 in (1.88 m)	200 lb (91 kg)	1944-02-08	Rhode Island
PF	8	Ollie Darden	6 ft 7 in (2.01 m)	235 lb (107 kg)	1944-07-28	Michigan
C	30	Wilbert Frazier	6 ft 7 in (2.01 m)	210 lb (95 kg)	1942-08-24	Grambling State
C	10	Tom Hoover	6 ft 9 in (2.06 m)	230 lb (104 kg)	1941-01-23	Villanova
SF	32	Tony Jackson	6 ft 4 in (1.93 m)	200 lb (91 kg)	1942-11-07	St. John's
PF	10	Stew Johnson	6 ft 8 in (2.03 m)	220 lb (100 kg)	1944-08-19	Murray State
C	42	Rod Knowles	6 ft 9 in (2.06 m)	215 lb (98 kg)	1946-02-27	Davidson
SF	27	Tony Koski	6 ft 8 in (2.03 m)	215 lb (98 kg)	1946-06-26	Providence
C	9	Manny Leaks	6 ft 8 in (2.03 m)	225 lb (102 kg)	1945-11-27	Niagara
SF	27	Leary Lentz	6 ft 6 in (1.98 m)	200 lb (91 kg)	1945-02-23	Houston
PG	3	Bob Lloyd	6 ft 2 in (1.88 m)	184 lb (83 kg)	1946-01-03	Rutgers
PF	20	Randolph Mahaffey	6 ft 7 in (2.01 m)	210 lb (95 kg)	1945-09-28	Clemson
SG	22	Maurice McHartley	6 ft 3 in (1.91 m)	185 lb (84 kg)	1942-08-01	North Carolina A&T
SG	22	Ron Perry	6 ft 3 in (1.91 m)	190 lb (86 kg)	1943-12-29	Virginia Tech
SF	4	Walt Simon	6 ft 6 in (1.98 m)	200 lb (91 kg)	1939-12-01	Benedict
PG	33	Willie Somerset	5 ft 8 in (1.73 m)	170 lb (77 kg)	1942-03-17	Duquesne
SG	40	Levern Tart	6 ft 2 in (1.88 m)	195 lb (88 kg)	1942-06-01	Bradley
SG	27	Bob Verga	6 ft 1 in (1.85 m)	190 lb (86 kg)	1945-09-07	Duke
PF	11	Hank Whitney	6 ft 7 in (2.01 m)	230 lb (104 kg)	1939-04-28	Iowa State
SF	10	Ken Wilburn	6 ft 6 in (1.98 m)	195 lb (88 kg)	1944-06-08	Central State
PG	33	Willie Worsley	5 ft 9 in (1.75 m)	175 lb (79 kg)	1945-11-13	UTEP

Coaches
Head coach
- Max Zaslofsky

Legend
- (DP) Unsigned draft pick
- (FA) Free agent
- (S) Suspended
- Injured

Roster

== ABA Playoffs ==
The Nets did not qualify for the playoffs this year. This would be the second straight season they would fail to quality for the ABA Playoffs after previously missing it via forced forfeiture on a one-game playoff match against the Kentucky Colonels.
