= Wayne Molis =

American basketball player

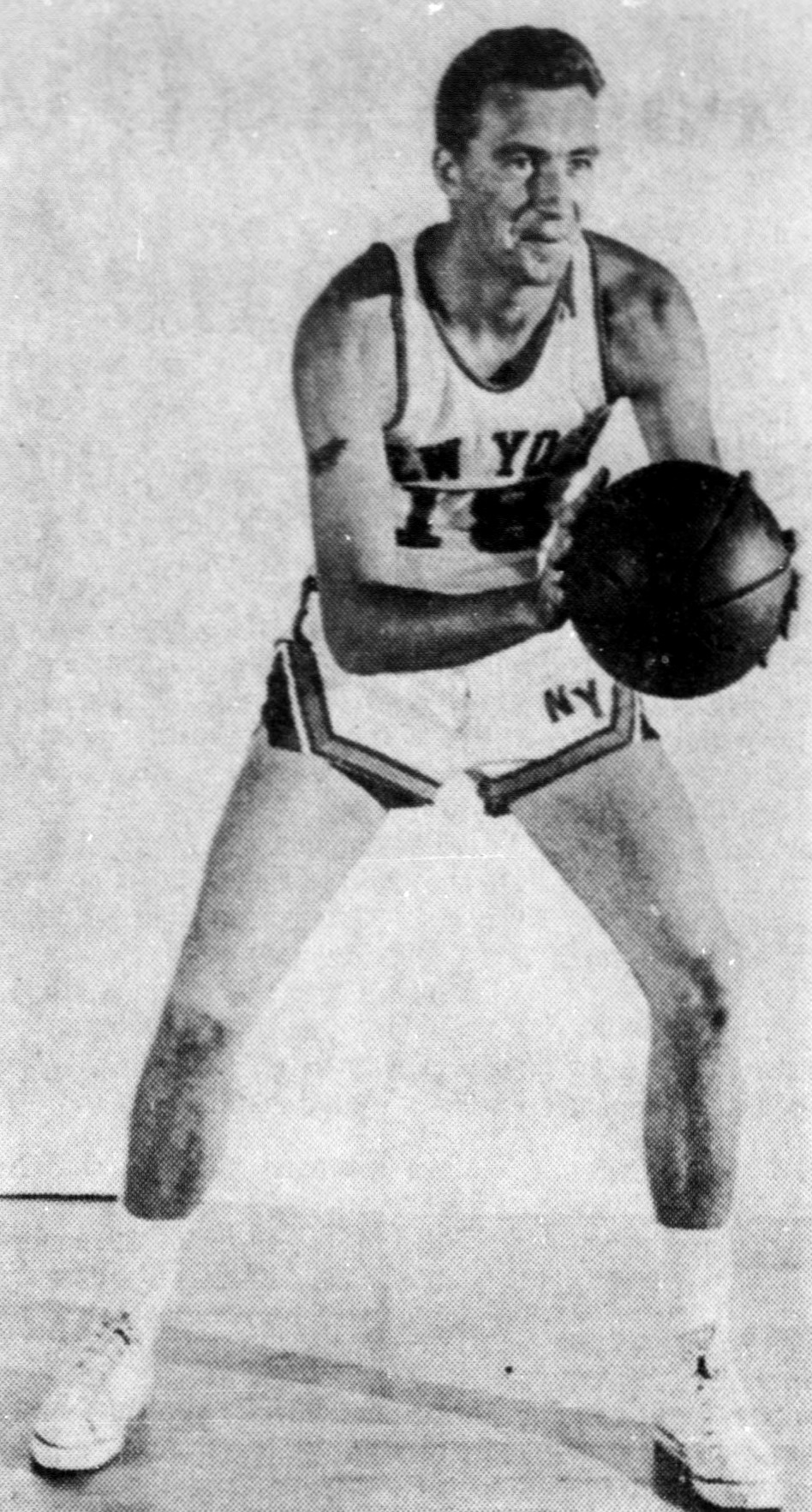
- Molis, circa 1967

Personal information
- Born: April 17, 1943 Chicago, Illinois, U.S.
- Died: March 24, 2002 (aged 58) Hinsdale, Illinois, U.S.
- Listed height: 6 ft 8 in (2.03 m)
- Listed weight: 230 lb (104 kg)

Career information
- High school: Harrison (Chicago, Illinois)
- College: Chicago State (1960–1962); Lewis (1963–1965)
- NBA draft: 1965: 10th round, 75th overall pick
- Drafted by: New York Knicks
- Playing career: 1966–1968
- Position: Center / power forward
- Number: 18, 32, 44

Career history
- 1966–1967: New York Knicks
- 1967–1968: Oakland Oaks
- 1967–1968: Houston Mavericks
- Stats at NBA.com
- Stats at Basketball Reference

Wayne J. Molis (April 17, 1943 – March 24, 2002) was an American basketball player who starred for two seasons at Lewis University in Romeoville, Illinois, a southwest Chicago suburb. The center-power forward went on the play one season for the New York Knicks in the National Basketball Association (NBA) and split a second between the Oakland Oaks and Houston Mavericks in the American Basketball Association (ABA).

== College career ==
At 6-8, 230 pounds, the man known as "Big Moe" was a dominant inside force for the Lewis Flyers team that advanced to the second round of the 1965 NAIA basketball tournament in Kansas City, Missouri. He was voted team co-Most Valuable Player along with guard Tony Delgado and selected for the NAIA All-American team.

At Lewis, Molis scored 915 points (23.5 per game) and grabbed 508 rebounds (13.0) in 39 appearances. As a senior, he averaged 24.5 points in the 1964-65 campaign. That season Molis set the Flyers record for most field goals in one game (20) against Chicago State (formerly Chicago Teachers College), where he had spent his first two years of college.

In 1980, Molis was part of the first Lewis Athletics Hall of Fame induction class.

== Professional career ==
The New York Knicks drafted Molis in the 10th round (78th overall) of the 1965 NBA draft. The rookie didn't make his debut until the 1966-67 season, when he saw action in 13 games off the bench. He was claimed by the San Diego Rockets in the 1967 expansion draft but was released in the preseason, Molis signed with the Oaks of the rival ABA, where he appeared in five games before a trade sent him to the Mavericks, with whom he played consistent minutes for the first time in his pro career.

Molis had his best game at the expense of his former team on February 22, when he produced career-highs of 18 points and 11 rebounds in a 125-118 victory in Oakland. He averaged 5.4 points and 3.9 rebounds in 41 games with the Mavericks, only to be sidelined in the postseason by a knee injury that eventually forced his retirement.

== Personal life ==
Molis served as a McCook, Illinois village trustee and operated a tavern called Big Moe's on Chicago's Southwest Side. He suffered a fatal brain hemorrhage on March 24, 2002 at 58 years of age.

== Career statistics ==
Legend
GP	Games played	GS	Games started	MPG	Minutes per game
FG%	Field goal percentage	3P%	3-point field goal percentage	FT%	Free throw percentage
RPG	Rebounds per game	APG	Assists per game	SPG	Steals per game
BPG	Blocks per game	PPG	Points per game	**Bold**	Career high

=== NBA/ABA ===
==== Regular season ====
Year	Team	GP	GS	MPG	FG%	3P%	FT%	RPG	APG	PPG
1966–67	New York	13	0	5.8	.373		.538	1.7	.2	3.5
1967–68	Oakland (ABA)	5		9.2	.385	–	**1.000**	2.0	.6	2.8
1967–68	Houston (ABA)	**41**		**11.9**	**.429**	**.667**	.649	**3.9**	**.9**	**5.4**
Career (ABA)		46		11.6	.427	.667	.672	3.7	.8	5.1
Career (overall)		59	0	10.3	.417	.667	.649	3.3	.7	4.7

==== Playoffs ====
Year	Team	GP	MPG	FG%	FT%	RPG	APG	PPG
1967	New York	1	10.0	.000	–	1.0	1.0	.0
