= Levern Tart =

American basketball player (1942–2010)

Personal information
- Born: June 1, 1942; Marion, South Carolina, U.S.
- Died: June 22, 2010 (aged 68); Long Beach, New York, U.S.
- Listed height: 6 ft 2 in (1.88 m)
- Listed weight: 195 lb (88 kg)

Career information
- High school: Roosevelt (West Palm Beach, Florida)
- College: Bradley (1961–1964)
- NBA draft: 1964: 6th round, 52nd overall pick
- Drafted by: Boston Celtics
- Playing career: 1964–1971
- Position: Shooting guard
- Number: 34, 40, 35, 12, 30, 23

Career history
- 1964–1967: Wilkes-Barre Barons
- 1967–1968: Oakland Oaks
- 1968–1969: New York Nets
- 1969: Houston Mavericks
- 1969: Denver Rockets
- 1969–1971: New York Nets
- 1971: Texas Chaparrals

Career highlights
- 2× ABA All-Star (1968, 1970); 2× All-EPBL First Team (1966, 1967); First-team All-MVC (1964)
- Stats at Basketball Reference

Levern Tart (June 1, 1942 – June 22, 2010) was an American professional basketball player. He played college basketball for the Bradley Braves and for five teams of the American Basketball Association.

== Early life ==
Born in Marion, South Carolina, Tart went to Roosevelt High School in West Palm Beach, Florida.

== College career ==
The 6'2" (later listed as 6'3"), 195-pound (88 kg) guard Tart played college basketball at Bradley University with Joe Strawder. He had not been recruited to play college basketball and so he intended to go to Indiana University, where Ron Burns and Bobby Knight played football before Bradley's coach discovered and signed him. In his career at Bradley Tart scored 1,053 points in 73 games for an average of 14.4 points per game. He was the Most Valuable Player of the 1964 National Invitational Tournament, which Bradley won. In that season Tart led the team with 17.5 points per game and was first-team All-Missouri Valley Conference.

== Amateur and semi-professional career ==
Tart was drafted by the Boston Celtics of the NBA and was the final player cut from their roster by Red Auerbach prior to the 1964–65 season. Tart played for the Wilkes-Barre Barons in the Eastern Professional Basketball League (EPBL) from 1964 to 1967. He was selected to the All-EPBL First Team in 1966 and 1967. During that time he also coached and taught at Central Catholic High School in Kingston, Pennsylvania. Tart eventually landed with the Jamaico Saints, an AAU team.

== Professional career ==
Tart left the AAU for the American Basketball Association. He and teammate Steve Jones signed with the Oakland Oaks in June, 1967. Tart played his entire professional career in the ABA, where he was known for effective drives to the basket, acrobatic shots with either hand, elusive speed and precise body and ball control on the floor.

=== Oakland Oaks ===
Tart was an original member of the Oakland Oaks and participated in the very first ABA game on October 13, 1967, when the Oaks defeated the Anaheim Amigos 132–129. On January 9, 1968, Tart played in the inaugural ABA All Star Game. For the season Tart averaged 23.5 points per game which was third-best in the league for the season. It was in Oakland that he acquired his nickname "Jelly".

=== New Jersey Americans ===
Nine days after playing in the ABA All-Star game, on January 18, 1968, Tart, who was leading the league in scoring at the time, was traded to the New Jersey Americans for guard Barry Leibowitz. He remained with the Americans through their move to New York when they became the New York Nets.

=== New York Nets ===
Tart played into the 1968–1969 season with the Nets until January 31, 1969, when Tart, Bob Verga and Hank Whitney were traded to the Houston Mavericks for Leary Lentz and Willie Somerset.

=== Houston Mavericks ===
Tart played for the Mavericks during the 1968–1969 season but during the season ended up with the Denver Rockets.

=== Denver Rockets ===
Tart finished the 1968–1969 season with the Denver Rockets. Despite his skills and talents, soon to become apparent with another team, Tart was not a major part of the Rockets plan on the floor.

=== New York Nets ===
The New York Nets obtained Tart in between the 1968–1969 and 1969–1970 seasons. Tart played the entire 1969–1970 season with the Nets and played in that season's ABA All Star game. During the season Tart averaged 24.1 points (third best in the ABA that season) and was the Nets' top scorer. Tart's 3.4 assists per game were tenth best in the league. In large part due to Tart's outstanding play the Nets went to their first ever full ABA playoff series, which they lost in seven games to the Kentucky Colonels. Tart also played a portion of the 1970–1971 season with the Nets until being traded again.

On 17 April 1970 he scored 46 points in his first playoff match, an all time record for most points scored in a playoff debut in the history of ABA and NBA that lasts after 53 years until today.

=== Texas Chaparrals ===
The Texas Chaparrals obtained Tart and Ed Johnson from the New York Nets on January 6, 1971, in exchange for Manny Leaks. Tart finished his professional basketball career with the Chaparrals.

For the entirety of his career in the ABA Tart scored 5,316 points in 274 games, averaging 19.4 points per game (24.3 in the playoffs) along with 5.0 rebounds (4.8 in the playoffs).

== Career after basketball ==
Tart devoted much of his career after basketball to community service. He became the site manager for a Long Island, New York senior care center, and worked at night as the recreation coordinator at the Nassau County Juvenile Detention Center.

Tart died at age 68 on June 22, 2010, in Long Beach, New York.
