= Blevins =

Blevins is a surname of Welsh origin. Notable people with the surname include:

- Al Blevins (1922–1988), American football and basketball coach
- Bret Blevins (born 1960), American comic book artist
- Christopher Blevins (born 1998), American cyclist
- Dean Blevins (born c. 1955), American football player, and broadcaster
- Frank Blevins (1939–2013), Australian politician
- Gayle Blevins (born c. 1953), American softball coach
- Harold Blevins (born 1943), American basketball player and coach
- Harry Blevins (1935–2018), American politician
- Jerry Blevins (born 1983), American MLB pitcher
- Juliette Blevins (born 1960), American linguist
- Tyler Blevins, better known as Ninja (born 1991), American eSports player
