= Leary Lentz =

American basketball player (1945–2024)

Personal information
- Born: February 23, 1945 Clarkton, Missouri, U.S.
- Died: May 26, 2024 (aged 79) Georgetown, Texas, U.S.
- Listed height: 6 ft 6 in (1.98 m)
- Listed weight: 200 lb (91 kg)

Career information
- High school: Cahokia (Cahokia, Illinois)
- College: Houston (1964–1967)
- NBA draft: 1967: undrafted
- Position: Small forward
- Number: 35, 27

Career history
- 1967–1969: Houston Mavericks
- 1969: New York Nets
- Stats at Basketball Reference

Leary Lee Lentz (February 23, 1945 – May 26, 2024) was an American basketball player. After playing college basketball at the University of Houston, the 6 ft 6 in (1.98 m) forward played for two seasons in the American Basketball Association with the Houston Mavericks and the New York Nets.

Lentz died on May 26, 2024, at the age of 79.

== Career statistics ==
Legend
GP	Games played	GS	Games started	MPG	Minutes per game
FG%	Field goal percentage	3P%	3-point field goal percentage	FT%	Free throw percentage
RPG	Rebounds per game	APG	Assists per game	SPG	Steals per game
BPG	Blocks per game	PPG	Points per game	**Bold**	Career high

=== ABA ===
==== Regular season ====
Year	Team	GP	MPG	FG%	3P%	FT%	RPG	APG	PPG
1967–68	Houston	**78**	**32.1**	.406	.000	.665	**8.3**	**1.1**	**10.7**
1968–69	Houston	44	15.6	**.418**	.000	.581	3.7	.5	4.9
1968–69	N.Y. Nets	26	17.0	.381	–	**.767**	4.1	.3	5.0
Career		148	24.5	.405	.000	.660	6.2	.8	8.0

==== Playoffs ====
Year	Team	GP	MPG	FG%	3P%	FT%	RPG	APG	PPG
1968	Houston	3	24.3	.462	.000	.333	6.3	1.0	8.3
