= Bill Meyer (basketball) =

American basketball player (1943–2018)

Personal information
- Born: August 20, 1943 Cleveland, Ohio, U.S.
- Died: April 8, 2018 (aged 74) Martinsburg, West Virginia, U.S.
- Listed height: 6 ft 3 in (1.91 m)
- Listed weight: 195 lb (88 kg)

Career information
- High school: Warrensville (Warrensville, Ohio)
- College: Hiram (1961–1965)
- NBA draft: 1965: 11th round, 81st overall pick
- Drafted by: New York Knicks
- Position: Guard
- Number: 22

Career history
- 1967: Pittsburgh Pipers

Career highlights
- First-team All-OAC (1965)
- Stats at Basketball Reference

William Joseph Meyer (August 20, 1943 – April 8, 2018) was an American professional basketball player. He played in the American Basketball Association for the Pittsburgh Pipers. He averaged 3.1 points per game in seven games played.

Meyer died on April 8, 2018, in Martinsburg, West Virginia.
