= Hal Hale =

American basketball player and coach

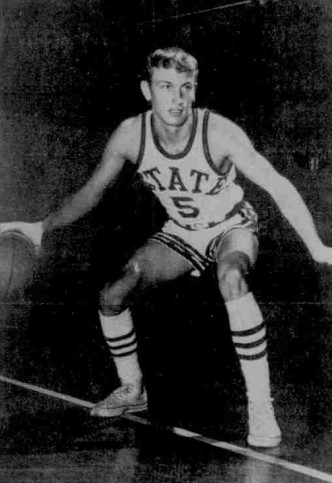
- Hale, circa 1967

Personal information
- Born: September 21, 1945 (age 81)
- Listed height: 6 ft 1 in (1.85 m)
- Listed weight: 180 lb (82 kg)

Career information
- High school: Jordan (Sandy, Utah) Hillcrest (Midvale, Utah)
- College: Utah State (1964–1967)
- NBA draft: 1967: undrafted
- Position: Point guard
- Number: 20

Career history
- 1967–1968: Houston Mavericks
- Stats at Basketball Reference

Hal Hale was an American basketball player and coach.

Hale was born and raised in Midvale, Utah. He currently resides in his childhood home as a Midvale resident.

Hale played high school basketball at Jordan High School in Sandy, Utah from 1960 to 1962 and won a state championship there. In 1962, Hillcrest High School opened in Midvale, Utah. Hale was in the Hillcrest boundaries, and transferred to Hillcrest, where he became the starting point guard. In addition to playing basketball, Hale became the first student body president of Hillcrest High School.

Hale played college basketball at Utah State University where he played for coach LaDell Anderson.

After college, Hale played professional basketball for the Houston Mavericks of the American Basketball Association before the ABA-NBA merger. Hale became the first professional athlete to graduate from Hillcrest High School. Hale's professional basketball career was cut short when he was drafted into the United States Army and sent to serve in the Vietnam War as a combat medic, winning the Purple Heart and a Bronze Star.

After his Army service, Hale returned to Jordan High School and became its head basketball coach, winning a state championship in 1984 and two division championships.

In 2024, the Midvale Arts Council voted to induct Hal Hale as a member of the Hall of Honors, due to his commitment and example to the community of Midvale.

== Career statistics ==
Legend
GP	Games played	GS	Games started	MPG	Minutes per game
FG%	Field goal percentage	3P%	3-point field goal percentage	FT%	Free throw percentage
RPG	Rebounds per game	APG	Assists per game	SPG	Steals per game
BPG	Blocks per game	PPG	Points per game	**Bold**	Career high

=== ABA ===
==== Regular season ====
Year	Team	GP	MPG	FG%	3P%	FT%	RPG	APG	PPG
1967–68	Houston	72	23.7	.326	.313	.674	2.9	2.0	5.0

==== Playoffs ====
Year	Team	GP	MPG	FG%	3P%	FT%	RPG	APG	PPG
1968	Houston	3	34.3	.375	1.000	1.000	2.7	1.0	7.3
