= Roger Schurig =

American basketball player

Personal information
- Born: April 3, 1942 (age 84) St. Louis, Missouri, U.S.
- Listed height: 6 ft 3 in (1.91 m)
- Listed weight: 185 lb (84 kg)

Career information
- High school: Kirkwood (Kirkwood, Missouri)
- College: Vanderbilt (1962–1965)
- NBA draft: 1965: undrafted
- Position: Point guard
- Number: 25

Career history
- 1967–1968: Houston Mavericks
- Stats at Basketball Reference

Roger Paul Schurig (born April 3, 1942) was an American basketball player.

Schurig, originally from St. Louis, Missouri, played college basketball at Vanderbilt University from 1963 through 1965. Schurig's exploits at Vanderbilt included winning multiple games with last-second clutch shots, including one against Southeastern Conference powerhouse Kentucky in 1963.

Schurig later played professional basketball for the Houston Mavericks of the American Basketball Association before the ABA-NBA merger.
