= Willie Somerset =

American basketball player (born 1942)

Personal information
- Born: March 17, 1942 (age 84) Sharon, Pennsylvania, U.S.
- Listed height: 5 ft 8 in (1.73 m)
- Listed weight: 170 lb (77 kg)

Career information
- High school: Farrell (Farrell, Pennsylvania)
- College: Duquesne (1961–1965)
- NBA draft: 1965: 7th round, 56th overall pick
- Drafted by: Baltimore Bullets
- Playing career: 1965–1973
- Position: Point guard
- Number: 24, 12, 33

Career history
- 1965: Baltimore Bullets
- 1965–1966: Johnstown C.J.'s
- 1966–1967: Scranton Miners
- 1967–1969: Houston Mavericks
- 1969: New York Nets
- 1969–1972: Scranton Miners / Apollos
- 1972–1973: Garden State Colonials

Career highlights
- ABA All-Star (1969); EBA champion (1971); EBA Most Valuable Player (1971); All-EBA First Team (1971); All-EPBL Second Team (1967); No. 24 retired by Duquesne Dukes

Career NBA and ABA statistics
- Points: 3,129 (21.9 ppg)
- Rebounds: 652 (4.6 rpg)
- Assists: 514 (3.6 apg)
- Stats at NBA.com
- Stats at Basketball Reference

Willard F. Somerset (born March 17, 1942) is an American former professional basketball player. Born in Sharon, Pennsylvania, Somerset attended Farrell High School in Farrell, Pennsylvania and later, Duquesne University in Pittsburgh, Pennsylvania.

A 5'8" guard from Duquesne University, Somerset played eight games for the Baltimore Bullets during the 1965–66 NBA season, averaging 5.6 points per game. He blossomed in the American Basketball Association, where he averaged 22.8 points in 135 games with the Houston Mavericks and New York Nets from 1967 to 1969. During the 1968–69 ABA season, when he was named an All-Star, Somerset ranked fifth in the league in points per game, eighth in assists per game, and third in free throw percentage.

Somerset played in the Eastern Professional Basketball League (EPBL) / Eastern Basketball Association (EBA) for the Johnstown C-J's, Scranton Miners / Apollos and Garden State Colonials from 1965 to 1973. He won an EBA championship with the Apollos in 1971. Somerset was selected as the EBA Most Valuable Player and named to the All-EBA First Team in 1971 and selected to the All-EPBL Second Team in 1967.

After his playing career, Willie became a pharmacist and retired from the profession in 2012.

Somerset was named one of the "Outstanding Young Men of America" in 1968. He was inducted into the Duquesne University Sports Hall of Fame in 1976 and into the Pennsylvania Sports Hall of Fame in 1982 (Western Chapter) and in 1994. In 1997, Somerset was inducted into the Mercer County Hall of Fame.

== Career statistics ==
Legend
GP	Games played	GS	Games started	MPG	Minutes per game
FG%	Field goal percentage	3P%	3-point field goal percentage	FT%	Free throw percentage
RPG	Rebounds per game	APG	Assists per game	SPG	Steals per game
BPG	Blocks per game	PPG	Points per game	**Bold**	Career high

=== NBA/ABA ===
==== Regular season ====
Year	Team	GP	GS	MPG	FG%	3P%	FT%	RPG	APG	PPG
1965–66	Baltimore	8		12.3	.419		.818	1.9	1.1	5.6
1967–68	Houston (ABA)	**61**		38.3	**.448**	**.308**	.780	**5.0**	3.7	21.7
1968–69	Houston (ABA)	43		41.7	.395	.227	**.836**	4.6	**4.0**	23.5
1968–69	N.Y. Nets (ABA)	31		**42.7**	.429	.297	.820	4.4	3.4	**24.1**
Career (ABA)		135		40.4	.426	.280	.808	4.7	3.7	22.8
Career (overall)		143		38.8	.425	.280	.808	4.6	3.6	21.9
All-Star (ABA)		1	0	17.0	.286	–	1.000	1.5	1.5	3.0

==== Playoffs ====
Year	Team	GP	MPG	FG%	3P%	FT%	RPG	APG	PPG
1968	Houston (ABA)	3	43.7	.411	.286	.794	8.3	3.0	30.3

== See also ==
- List of shortest players in National Basketball Association history
