= Joe Hamood =

American basketball player (1943–1970)

Personal information
- Born: September 7, 1943
- Died: August 19, 1970 (aged 26) Dearborn, Michigan, U.S.
- Listed height: 6 ft 0 in (1.83 m)
- Listed weight: 180 lb (82 kg)

Career information
- High school: Fordson (Dearborn, Michigan)
- College: Houston (1963–1966)
- NBA draft: 1966: undrafted
- Position: Shooting guard
- Number: 22

Career history
- 1967–1968: Houston Mavericks
- Stats at Basketball Reference

Joseph Hamood (September 7, 1943 — August 19, 1970) was an American professional basketball player. After playing college basketball at the University of Houston, the 6-foot-tall (1.8 m) guard played for one season in the American Basketball Association with the Houston Mavericks.

Hamood was killed in an automobile accident at age 26 in Dearborn, Michigan.
