= Gary Turner (basketball) =

American basketball player

Personal information
- Born: November 23, 1942 North Fort Worth, Texas, U.S.
- Died: June 8, 2023 (aged 80) Burleson, Texas, U.S.
- Listed height: 6 ft 7 in (2.01 m)
- Listed weight: 200 lb (91 kg)

Career information
- High school: Fort Worth Tech (Fort Worth, Texas)
- College: TCU (1963–1966)
- NBA draft: 1966: 3rd round, 28th overall pick
- Drafted by: Boston Celtics
- Position: Forward

Career history
- 1967: Houston Mavericks

Career highlights
- 2× All-SWC (1965, 1966)
- Stats at Basketball Reference

Gary Dale Turner (November 23, 1942 – June 8, 2023) was an American professional basketball player. He played for the Houston Mavericks in two games during the 1967–68 American Basketball Association season. He recorded totals of six points and three rebounds.
