= Tony Koski =

American basketball player (born 1946)

Personal information
- Born: June 26, 1946 (age 80)
- Listed height: 6 ft 9 in (2.06 m)
- Listed weight: 215 lb (98 kg)

Career information
- College: Becker (1964–1966); Providence (1966–1968)
- NBA draft: 1968: undrafted
- Playing career: 1968–1979
- Position: Small forward
- Number: 27

Career history
- 1968: New York Nets
- 1968–1972: Hartford Capitols
- 1972–1974: Gießen 46ers
- 1975–1976: Nice BC
- 1978–1979: Gießen 46ers

Career highlights
- German Basketball Cup champion (1973); All-EPBL First Team (1970); All-EBA Second Team (1971)
- Stats at Basketball Reference

Anthony P. Koski (born June 26, 1946) is an American former professional basketball player. He played in the American Basketball Association (ABA) for the New York Nets in five games during the 1968–69 season. Koski played in the Eastern Professional Basketball League (EPBL) / Eastern Basketball Association (EBA) for the Hartford Capitols and was selected to the All-EPBL First Team in 1970 and All-EBA Second Team in 1971.

Koski also played in Germany for the Gießen 46ers, and in France for Nice's basketball club. He won the German Basketball Cup with the 46ers during the 1972–73 season.
