= Dick Clark (basketball) =

American basketball player

Personal information
- Born: January 5, 1944 Findlay, Ohio, U.S.
- Died: September 4, 1988 (aged 44)
- Listed height: 6 ft 4 in (1.93 m)
- Listed weight: 190 lb (86 kg)

Career information
- High school: North Baltimore (North Baltimore, Ohio)
- College: Eastern Kentucky (1964–1967)
- NBA draft: 1967: undrafted
- Playing career: 1967–1969
- Position: Point guard / shooting guard
- Number: 23, 33

Career history
- 1967–1968: Minnesota Muskies
- 1968–1969: Houston Mavericks
- Stats at Basketball Reference

Richard C. Clark (January 5, 1944 – September 4, 1988) was an American basketball player in the American Basketball Association (ABA).

Born in Findlay, Ohio he played collegiately for the Eastern Kentucky Colonels.

He played for the Minnesota Muskies (1967–68) and Houston Mavericks (1968–69) in the ABA for 58 games.
