= Saint Mary's Gaels men's basketball =

Basketball team that represents Saint Mary's College

Saint Mary's Gaels
2026–27 Saint Mary's Gaels men's basketball team
- College: Saint Mary's College of California
- Head coach: Mickey McConnell (1st season)
- Location: Moraga, California
- Arena: University Credit Union Pavilion (capacity: 3,500)
- Conference: WCC
- Nickname: Gaels
- Colors: Navy, red, and silver

NCAA Division I tournament Elite Eight
- 1959
Other NCAA Division I tournament results
Sweet Sixteen	1959, 2010
Appearances	1959, 1989, 1997, 2005, 2008, 2010, 2012, 2013, 2017, 2019, 2022, 2023, 2024, 2025, 2026

Conference tournament champions
- 1997, 2010, 2012, 2019, 2024

Conference regular-season champions
- 1959, 1980, 1989, 1997, 2011, 2012, 2016, 2023, 2024, 2025, 2026

Uniforms
Home	Away	Alternate

The Saint Mary's Gaels men's basketball team represents Saint Mary's College in Moraga, California, competing in the West Coast Conference of the NCAA. The team plays home games in the University Credit Union Pavilion, capacity 3,500; it is one of the smaller gyms in the WCC. Their head coach is Mickey McConnell, he replaced Randy Bennett, who is the school's all-time wins leader. The Gaels have appeared in fifteen NCAA Tournaments—1959, 1989, 1997, 2005, 2008, 2010, 2012, 2013, 2017, 2019, and every tournament from 2022 to 2026.

On March 1, 2013, they were placed on probation by the NCAA for four years due to rules violations.

Their two historic rivals are the San Francisco Dons and the Santa Clara Broncos, two other Catholic schools in the San Francisco Bay Area that are in the WCC. More recently, the Saint Mary's Gaels have developed a rivalry with the Gonzaga University Bulldogs of Spokane, Washington.

== History ==
=== Early History: 1959-2000 ===
Saint Mary's College of California's basketball program boasts a history dating back to the early 20th century. While maintaining a consistent presence in collegiate basketball, the 1959 season stands out as a landmark achievement. Led by coach James Weaver, the Gaels achieved a remarkable feat by advancing to the NCAA Tournament's Elite Eight. This deep tournament run remains one of the program's most celebrated accomplishments, showcasing the team's talent and solidifying Saint Mary's place in the annals of West Coast basketball history. The foundation laid in these early years, including the 1959 success, has contributed to the program's continued growth and competitiveness in the modern era.

The 1980s and 1990s saw Saint Mary's maintain a competitive presence in the West Coast Conference (WCC). This era was marked by periods of both rebuilding and resurgence, with the Gaels achieving notable success by capturing WCC tournament titles in 1980, 1989, and 1997. These championships earned Saint Mary's automatic bids to the NCAA Tournament, providing valuable national exposure and solidifying their status as a force within the conference. While consistent NCAA Tournament appearances were not a hallmark of every season, these WCC titles represent significant high points and demonstrate the program's ability to compete for championships during this era.

=== Randy Bennett era: 2001-2026 ===
The Gaels compete in the West Coast Conference (pictured).
– Full member
– Departing full member
– Future members
– Affiliate member
Not pictured: Affiliate member Creighton

Under coach Randy Bennett, the men's basketball team has become recognized nationally as one of the top non-Power 5 programs in the United States. He inherited a 2–27 team when he arrived in 2001, and began recruiting an Australian named Adam Caporn. Since then, Bennett has built a reputation of recruiting Australian players; the Gaels have had at least one Australian player in every season since Bennett's arrival. With Caporn in the line-up, and his best friend and fellow Australian Daniel Kickert joining him the following year, Saint Mary's record improved to 9–20 in 2001–02, 15–15 in 2002–03, and 19–12 in 2003–04. In 2004–05, the team earned an at-large bid to the NCAA tournament, although they lost in the first round. Their 15–1 record in McKeon Pavilion was its best ever.

After rebuilding seasons in 2005–06 and 2006–07, the team enjoyed one of their best seasons in school history in 2007–08, behind the play of Australian freshman Patty Mills. The team was ranked in the AP and USA Today top 25 lists for five and six weeks, respectively. They ended up receiving an at-large bid to the NCAA tournament in 2008 as well, but again lost in the first round. In 2008, the team got off to a strong start, going 14–2 before Mills broke his hand and missed a month. Mills came back in time for the West Coast Conference tournament, but after a loss to Gonzaga in the WCC tournament finals, the team was not selected for the NCAA tournament and played in the NIT. After the end of the year, Mills declared for the NBA draft and was a second-round selection.

In March 2010, the Gaels received an automatic bid to the 2010 NCAA tournament, after winning the championship game of the WCC Tournament. Having beaten Gonzaga in the tournament final, it was the Gaels' second WCC tournament victory since it began in 1987. In 2010, they won their first NCAA Tournament game since 1959, defeating the Richmond Spiders. On March 20, 2010, the Gaels, led by Omar Samhan, defeated second seeded Villanova to advance to the Sweet Sixteen, for their first time in the 64 team era. They then lost to 3 seed Baylor 72–49 to end their season 28–6 and with its worst loss of the year.

Following the loss of Samhan to graduation, many expected the Gaels next season to be a rebuilding year. Led by point guard Mickey McConnell, however, Saint Mary's compiled a 25–9 record, 11–3 in the WCC, including the Gaels' first win against Gonzaga in Spokane since 1995. But after absorbing a late-season loss to last-place San Diego and dropping an ESPN BracketBuster game at home against Utah State, Saint Mary's failed to make the NCAA tournament. They would be upset in the first round of the NIT by Kent State. After McConnell graduated, Australian point guard Matthew Dellavedova became the team's new star alongside San Diego transfer and San Francisco native Rob Jones. The Gaels compiled a 27–6 record and went 14–2 in the WCC in 2011–12, including a win in Moraga over Gonzaga and a sweep of new conference member BYU. Saint Mary's spent most of the season ranked in the AP and Coaches' polls and won the outright WCC regular season title, the first time since 2000 that Gonzaga had not claimed part of the title. The Gaels then defeated Gonzaga in overtime in the WCC tournament, marking the first time in school history Saint Mary's won both the regular season and tournament titles. Saint Mary's lost to Purdue in the first round of the NCAA tournament.

Saint Mary's Australian pipeline, historically focused on the Australian Institute of Sport (from where Caporn and Mills were recruited), continues to the present. The 2011–12 team featured four AIS graduates, including 2012 WCC Player of the Year Dellavedova, and another Australian, Jorden Page. The 2015–16 team had four AIS graduates, boasting a total of six Australians, and the 2016–17 roster had a program record of seven Australians. In the latter season, the Gaels went so far as to hold an official celebration of Australia Day for their home game against San Francisco, which fell on the holiday's date of January 26. Before the game, Australia's national anthem was played alongside the US anthem, and the school honored officials from Australia's San Francisco consulate.

On March 23rd, 2026, Arizona State University announced that Bennett would be the next head coach of the Arizona State Sun Devils men's basketball team. This move ended Bennett's 26 year run as the Gaels' head coach.

=== Mickey McConnell era: 2026-Present ===
Following Bennett's departure, St. Mary's named then-associate head coach Mickey McConnell as the new head coach of the program. He had been serving as an assistant to Bennett since 2019.

== Postseason ==
=== NCAA tournament results ===
The Gaels have made 15 NCAA tournament appearances. They have an overall 8–15 record in tournament games.

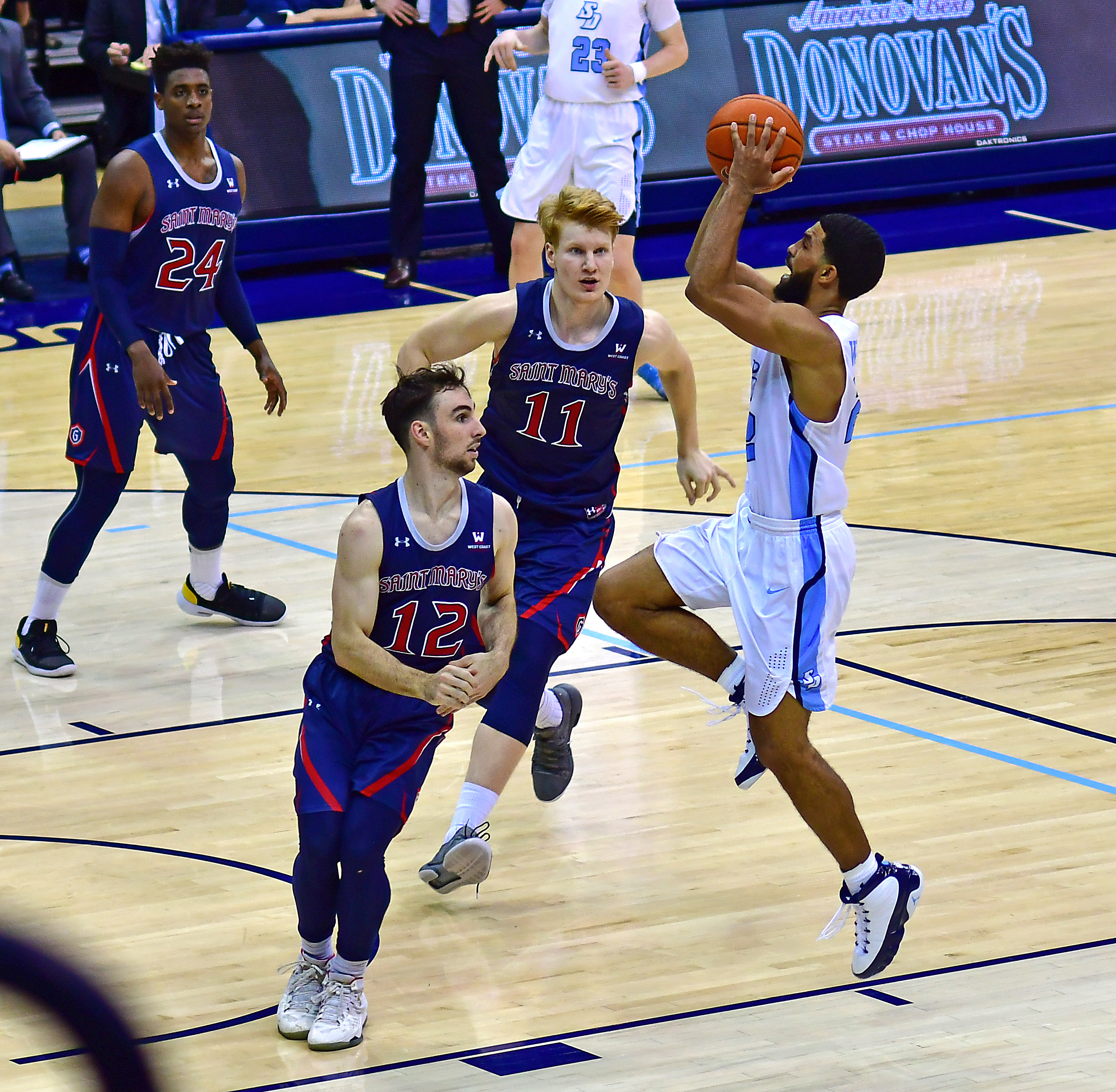
St. Mary's (in blue) v San Diego game in 2019

Year	Seed	Round	Opponent	Result
1959	N/A	Sweet Sixteen; Elite Eight	Idaho State; California	W 80–71; L 46–66
1989	#8	First Round	#9 Clemson	L 70–83
1997	#14	First Round	#3 Wake Forest	L 46–68
2005	#10	First Round	#7 Southern Illinois	L 56–65
2008	#10	First Round	#7 Miami (FL)	L 64–78
2010	#10	First Round; Second Round; Sweet Sixteen	#7 Richmond #2 Villanova #3 Baylor	W 80–71; W 75–68; L 49–72
2012	#7	First Round	#10 Purdue	L 69–72
2013	#11	First Four; First Round	#11 Middle Tennessee #6 Memphis	W 67–54; L 52–54
2017	#7	First Round; Second Round	#10 VCU #2 Arizona	W 85–77; L 60–69
2019	#11	First Round	#6 Villanova	L 57–61
2022	#5	First Round; Second Round	#12 Indiana #4 UCLA	W 82–53; L 56–72
2023	#5	First Round; Second Round	#12 VCU #4 UConn	W 63–51; L 55–70
2024	#5	First Round	#12 Grand Canyon	L 66–75
2025	#7	First Round; Second Round	#10 Vanderbilt #2 Alabama	W 59–56; L 66–80
2026	#7	First Round	#10 Texas A&M	L 50–63

=== NIT results ===
The Gaels have appeared in six National Invitation Tournaments. Their combined record is 7–7.

Year	Seed	Round	Opponent	Result
2009	#2	First Round; Second Round; Quarterfinals	#7 Washington State #6 Davidson #1 San Diego State	W 68–57; W 80–68; L 66–70
2011	#2	First Round	#7 Kent State	L 70–71
2014	#4	First Round; Second Round	#5 Utah #1 Minnesota	W 70–58; L 55–63
2015	#4	First Round	#5 Vanderbilt	L 64–75
2016	#2	First Round; Second Round; Quarterfinals	#7 New Mexico State #3 Georgia #1 Valparaiso	W 58–56; W 77–65; L 44–60
2018	#1	First Round; Second Round; Quarterfinals	#8 Southeastern Louisiana #5 Washington #2 Utah	W 89–45; W 85–81; L 58–67 ^{OT}
2021	#2	First Round	#3 Western Kentucky	L 67–69

== Venues ==
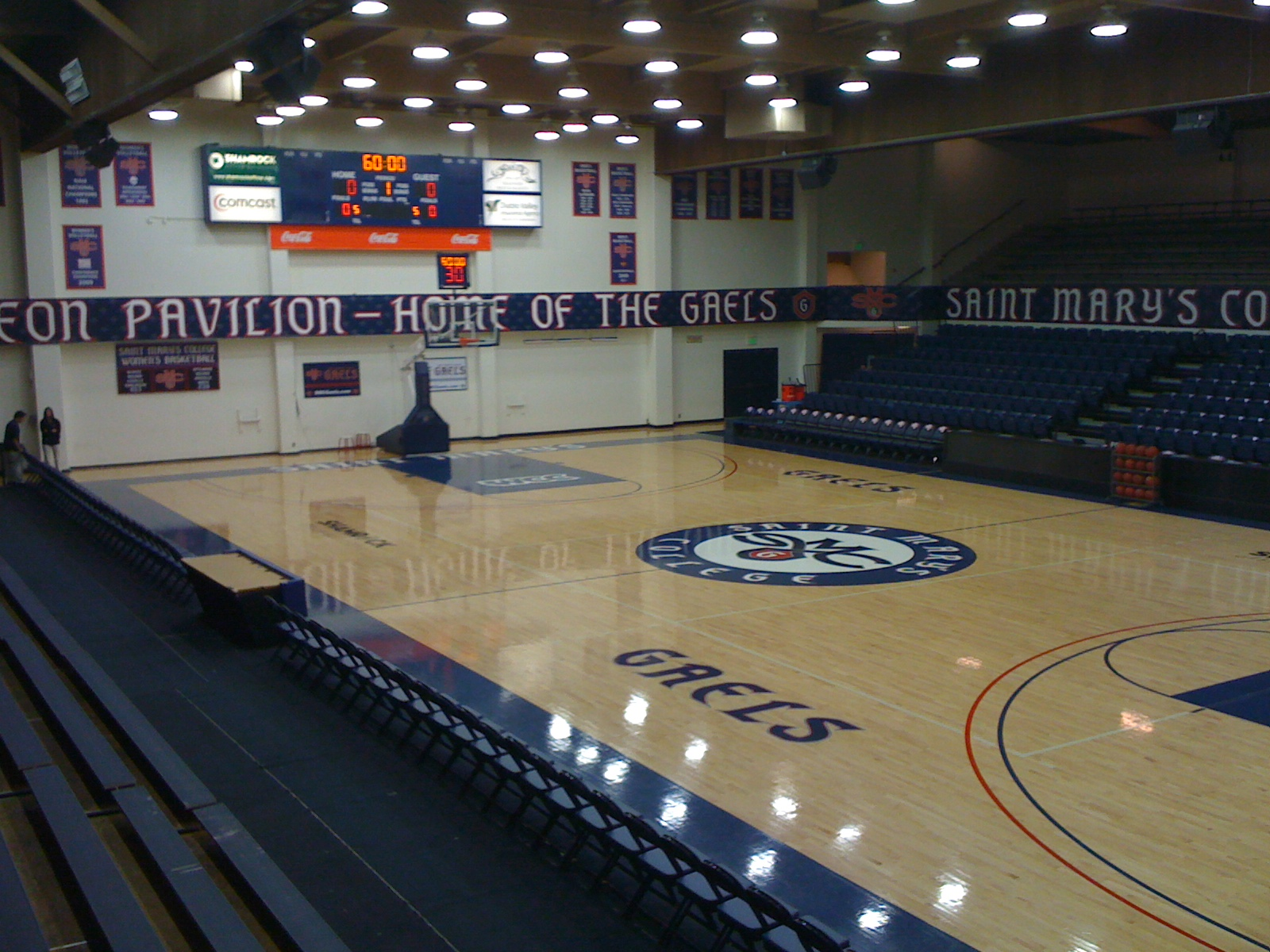
Interior of McKeon Pavilion, home of the Gaels

Saint Mary's basketball and volleyball teams play their home games at the University Credit Union Pavilion, which has a capacity of 3,500. It was originally named after George R. McKeon, a former member of the college's Board of Regents. Constructed in 1978, it underwent renovations in the summer of 2006, with new features including painted bleachers, new chair backseats behind the reserved section, a remodeled VIP section, and a banner with "GaelForce" on it behind the student section. In 2019, the venue was renamed to University Credit Union Pavilion.

== Rivalries ==
=== Gonzaga ===
Saint Mary's biggest rivalry is with fellow West Coast Conference foe Gonzaga. Many analysts and members of the media have touted the Gaels vs. Zags as one of the best, if not the best, college basketball rivalry on the West Coast, as both teams have been consistently the two top teams in the conference over the last 2 decades. Since 2001, the rivalry has involved 2 of the school's greatest coaches in Mark Few and Randy Bennett. Gonzaga and Saint Mary's have combined to win 24 out of the last 26 conference championship games (Gonzaga 20, Saint Mary's 4, San Diego 2). The schools have faced off in the WCC Championship 15 times with Gonzaga holding the 11–4 edge. On October 1, 2024, Gonzaga accepted an invitation to join the Pac-12 Conference, effective July 1, 2026.

As of 2026, Gonzaga leads the all-time series 83–38.

== Notable players ==
=== Retired numbers ===
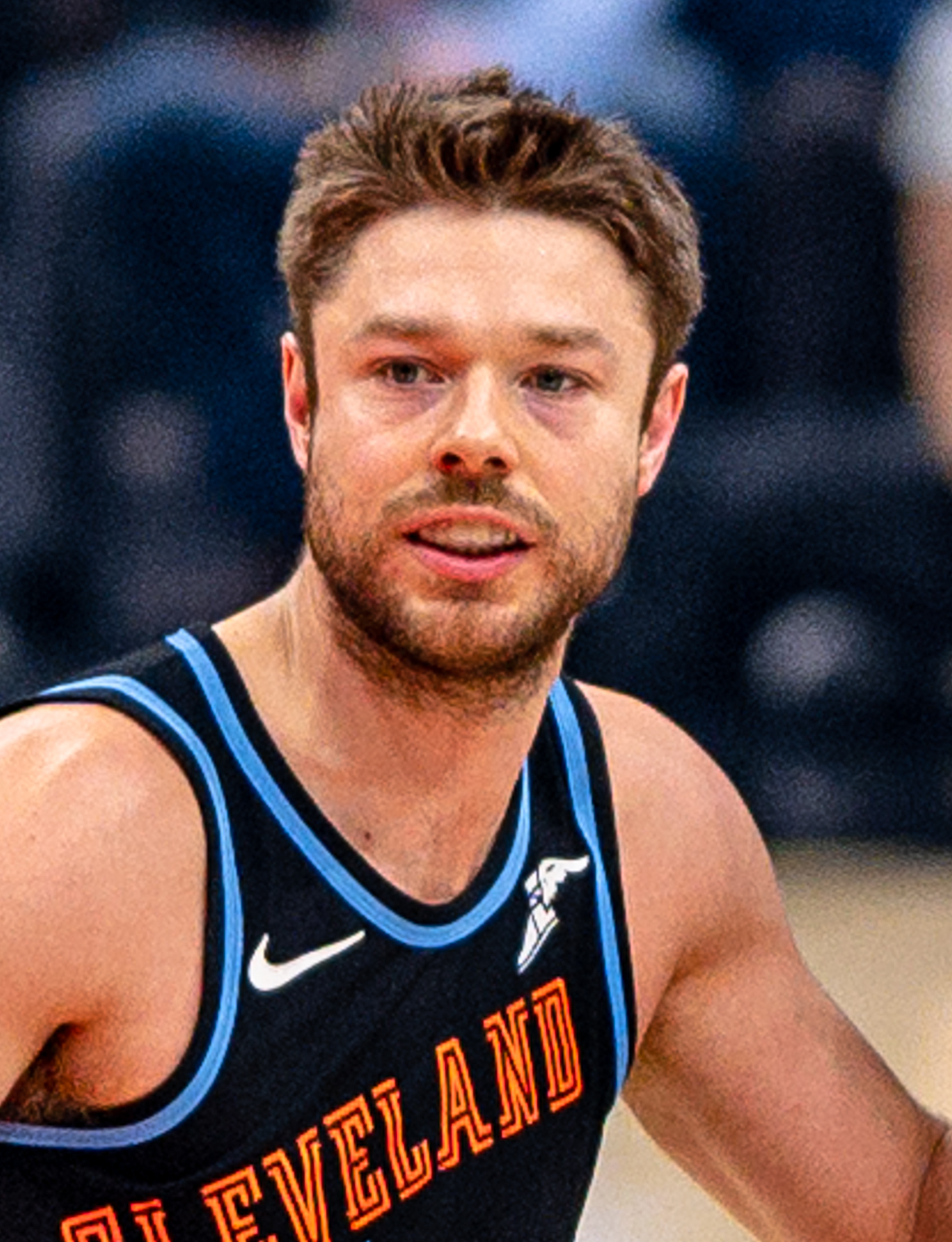
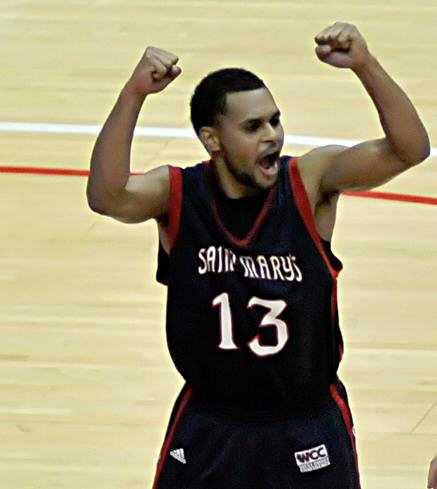
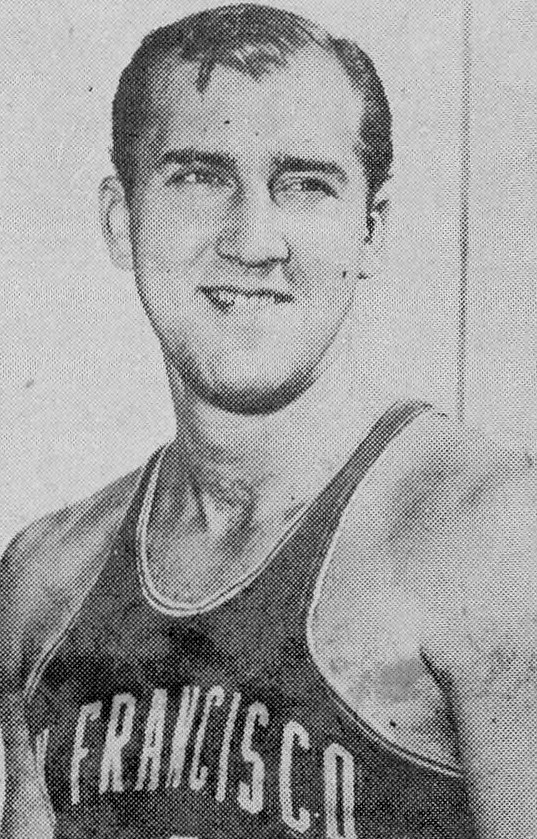
Fltr: Matthew Dellavedova, Patty Mills, and Tom Meschery, who have their numbers retired by Saint Mary's

Saint Mary's Gaels retired numbers
No.	Player	Pos.	Career	No. ret.	Ref.
4	Matthew Dellavedova	PG / SG	2009–2013	2014	
13	Patty Mills	PG	2007–2009	2015	
31	Tom Meschery	PF	1958–1961		
34	Jock Landale	C	2014–2018	2024	

=== Notable in other fields ===
- Mahershala Ali, guard 1992–1996, two-time Academy Award winning actor, listed as Hershal Gilmore while at Saint Mary's
