= Harold Blevins =

American basketball player and coach

Personal information
- Born: October 19, 1943 (age 83) Tuscaloosa, Alabama, U.S.
- Listed height: 6 ft 1 in (1.85 m)
- Listed weight: 188 lb (85 kg)

Career information
- College: Arkansas–Pine Bluff (1961–1965)
- NBA draft: 1965: 2nd round, 14th overall pick
- Drafted by: New York Knicks
- Playing career: 1965–1966
- Position: Shooting guard
- Coaching career: 1969–2002

Career history

Playing
- 1965–1966: Trenton Colonials

Coaching
- 1969–1970: Arkansas–Pine Bluff (assistant)
- 1970–1995: Harford CC
- 1995–2002: Arkansas–Pine Bluff

Career highlights
- 3× NAIA All-American (1963–1965); 3× First-team All-SWAC Team (1963–1965); No. 50 jersey retired by Arkansas–Pine Bluff Golden Lions
- Stats at Basketball Reference

Career coaching record
- College: 36–147 (.197)

Harold Blevins (born October 19, 1943) is an American former professional basketball player and coach. He was a four-year starter for the Arkansas AM&N Golden Lions, where he is considered one of the program's greatest scorers. Blevins was a three-time National Association of Intercollegiate Athletics (NAIA) All-American and All-Southwestern Athletic Conference (SWAC) selection.

Blevins was selected by the New York Knicks in the 1965 NBA draft as the 14th overall pick and became the first Golden Lions player to be selected in an National Basketball Association (NBA) draft. (Note: Frank Burgess, a selection in the 1961 NBA draft, played for the Golden Lions but was drafted after playing for Gonzaga.) Despite not playing football in college, he signed as a free agent with the Dallas Cowboys of the National Football League (NFL) that same year. Blevins ultimately played in neither the NBA nor the NFL but played for the Trenton Colonials of the Eastern Professional Basketball League (EPBL) during the 1965–66 season. He was drafted into the United States Army in 1966 and served a two-year stint in Vietnam.

Blevins was an assistant coach for the Golden Lions during the 1969–70 season. He was then appointed as the head basketball coach for the men's and women's teams at Harford Community College. He spent 25 years at Harford and led the mean's team to a 340–210 record despite having no athletic scholarships. On June 5, 1995, Blevins was appointed as head coach of the Golden Lions men's basketball team. Blevins had a 36–147 record over seven seasons and was fired on July 16, 2002.

Blevins was inducted into the Arkansas–Pine Bluff Golden Lions Hall of Fame in 2004 and the SWAC Hall of Fame in 2005. His No. 50 jersey was retired by the Golden Lions in 2016.
