= 1968 ABA All-Star Game =

Exhibition basketball game

The first American Basketball Association All-Star Game was played on January 9, 1968, at Hinkle Fieldhouse in Indianapolis, Indiana, before an audience of 10,872. Jim Pollard (Minnesota Muskies) coached the Eastern Conference team, while Babe McCarthy (New Orleans Buccaneers) coached the West.

Mel Daniels helped take the East team to victory by leading all players with 22 points and 15 rebounds, but Larry Brown of the losing West squad was named MVP. Joe Belmont and Ron Feiereisel officiated the game.

Score by Periods:	1	2	3	4	Final
West	29	30	32	29	120
East	30	31	31	34	126

== Western Conference ==
Player, Team	MIN	FGM	FGA	3PM	3PA	FTM	FTA	REB	AST	PTS
Doug Moe, NOB	29	7	13	0	1	3	5	7	5	17
Larry Jones, DNR	28	6	10	0	0	2	3	13	2	14
Levern Tart, OAK	27	4	12	0	0	5	5	3	3	13
Cliff Hagan, DLC	24	4	11	0	0	2	2	0	5	10
John Beasley, DLC	24	4	9	0	0	1	1	4	0	9
Larry Brown, NOB	22	7	9	2	2	1	1	3	5	17
Art Becker, HSM	19	5	13	0	0	1	1	5	0	11
Jimmy Jones, NOB	19	4	9	0	0	2	4	1	3	10
Red Robbins, NOB	18	2	5	0	0	0	0	4	0	4
Ben Warley, ANA	17	2	7	0	3	4	4	1	3	8
Larry Bunce, ANA	7	1	2	0	0	1	1	0	0	3
DeWitt Menyard, HSM	6	2	4	0	0	0	1	2	0	4
Bob Verga, DLC (military service)
Totals	240	48	104	2	6	22	28	43	26	120

== Eastern Conference ==
Player, Team	MIN	FGM	FGA	3PM	3PA	FTM	FTA	REB	AST	PTS
Mel Daniels, MNM	29	9	18	0	0	4	11	15	0	22
Louie Dampier, KEN	29	8	18	0	1	2	2	3	3	18
Roger Brown, IND	27	5	15	0	1	2	2	4	2	12
Connie Hawkins, PTP	26	3	6	0	0	1	3	9	2	7
Donnie Freeman, MNM	24	8	13	0	0	4	6	4	2	20
Darel Carrier, KEN	21	3	10	0	3	2	2	2	1	8
Les Hunter, MNM	21	2	7	0	0	3	5	8	1	7
Bob Netolicky, IND	19	4	8	0	0	4	4	11	1	12
Freddie Lewis, IND	18	3	9	0	0	0	0	0	3	6
Tony Jackson, NJA	12	2	6	0	3	0	0	2	1	4
Randolph Mahaffey, KEN	7	1	2	0	0	2	0	4	0	4
Chico Vaughn, PTP	4	2	2	2	2	0	0	0	0	6
Totals	240	50	114	2	10	24	41	62	16	126

- Halftime — East, 61–59
- Third Quarter — East, 92–91
