= Warrensville, Ohio =

Warrensville, Ohio can refer to:

- Warrensville Heights, Ohio, a city in Cuyahoga County
- Warrensville Township, Ohio, a paper township in Cuyahoga County
