= Guy Manning (basketball) =

American basketball player (born 1944)

Personal information
- Born: February 4, 1944 (age 82) Oakwood, Texas, U.S.
- Listed height: 6 ft 6 in (1.98 m)
- Listed weight: 195 lb (88 kg)

Career information
- High school: Butler (Oakwood, Texas)
- College: Prairie View A&M (1962–1966)
- NBA draft: 1966: 10th round, 87th overall pick
- Drafted by: Baltimore Bullets
- Position: Small forward
- Number: 31

Career history
- 1966–1967: Battle Creek Braves
- 1967–1969: Houston Mavericks
- Stats at Basketball Reference

Guy Manning (born February 4, 1944) was an American basketball player. He was born in Oakwood, Texas.

Manning played college basketball at Prairie View A&M University from 1962 through 1966. He was elected to membership in the Prairie View A&M University Sports Hall of Fame in 2005.

Manning was drafted by the Baltimore Bullets in the 10th round of the 1966 NBA draft. He played professional basketball in the American Basketball Association, prior to the ABA–NBA merger, with the Houston Mavericks.
