= 1965 NBA draft =

Basketball player selection

General information
- Sport: Basketball
- Date: May 6, 1965
- Location: Plaza Hotel (New York City, New York)

Overview
- 112 total selections in 17 rounds
- League: NBA
- Territorial picks: Bill Bradley, New York Knicks; Bill Buntin, Detroit Pistons; Gail Goodrich, Los Angeles Lakers
- First selection: Fred Hetzel, San Francisco Warriors
- Hall of Famers: 4: G Bill Bradley; G Gail Goodrich; F Rick Barry; F Billy Cunningham

The 1965 NBA draft was the 19th annual draft of the National Basketball Association (NBA). The draft was held on May 6, 1965, before the 1965–66 season.

In this draft, nine NBA teams took turns selecting amateur U.S. college basketball players. A player who had finished his four-year college eligibility was eligible for selection. If a player left college early, he would not be eligible for selection until his college class graduated. Teams that finished last in each division, the San Francisco Warriors and the New York Knicks, were awarded the first four picks in the draft. The remaining first-round picks and the subsequent rounds were assigned to teams in reverse order of their win–loss record in the previous season.

Before the draft, a team could forfeit its first-round draft pick and then select any player from within a 50-mile radius of its home arena as their territorial pick. The draft consisted of 17 rounds comprising 112 players selected. This draft was the last in which the territorial pick rule remained in effect before it was eliminated prior to the 1966 draft.

== Draft selections and draftee career notes ==
Bill Bradley, Bill Buntin and Gail Goodrich were selected before the draft as New York Knicks', Detroit Pistons' and Los Angeles Lakers' territorial picks respectively. Fred Hetzel from Davidson College was selected first overall by the San Francisco Warriors. Rick Barry from the University of Miami, who went on to win the Rookie of the Year Award in his first season, was drafted second by the Warriors. Four players from this draft, Barry, Bradley, Goodrich and fifth pick Billy Cunningham, have been inducted to the Basketball Hall of Fame. Barry and Cunningham were also named in the 50 Greatest Players in NBA History list announced at the league's 50th anniversary in 1996.

The Los Angeles Lakers had intended on selecting Wayne Estes, a Montana native who played for the Utah State Aggies, in the first round. However, Estes died on February 8, 1965, aged 21, when he was electrocuted by a downed wire at the scene of an auto accident he and teammates were visiting. Less than two hours before dying, Estes completed a game where he scored 48 points; his 47th point of the game was also the 2,000th of his college career.

Barry's achievements include one NBA championship with the Warriors in 1975, one Finals MVP, five All-NBA Team selections and four All-Star Game selections. Cunningham's achievements include an NBA championship with the Philadelphia 76ers in 1967, four All-NBA Team selections and four All-Star Game selections. He also played two seasons in the American Basketball Association (ABA) with the Carolina Cougars. In his first season there, he won the ABA Most Valuable Player Award and was selected to the ABA All-Star Game and All-ABA Team. He later coached the 76ers for eight seasons and won the NBA championship in 1983. Goodrich's achievements include an NBA championship with the Los Angeles Lakers in 1972, one All-NBA Team selection and five All-Star Game selections. Bradley, who spent all of his 10-year playing career with the Knicks, won the NBA championships twice in 1970 and 1973 and was also selected to one All-Star Game. Bradley became a successful politician after retiring from basketball. He was elected as a Democrat to the United States Senate for 18 years. He was also a candidate for the Democratic presidential nomination in 2000, losing to incumbent Vice President Al Gore in the presidential primaries.

Bob Love, the 33rd pick, was selected to two All-NBA Teams and three All-Star Games. Jerry Sloan, the 4th pick, was selected to two All-Star Games during his playing career before becoming a head coach. He coached the Chicago Bulls for three seasons before being fired during the 1981–82 season. He then became the head coach of the Utah Jazz in 1988, the position he held until resigning in early 2011. He has been inducted to the Basketball Hall of Fame as a coach. Twin brothers Dick and Tom Van Arsdale, who were drafted with the 10th and 11th picks, became the first set of twins to play in the NBA. Each of them had three All-Star Game selections. They played for different NBA teams until their last season, which they spent together as a member of the Phoenix Suns. Dick Van Arsdale also had a coaching career. He was the interim head coach of the Suns in 1987. Two other players from this draft, 15th pick Flynn Robinson and 24th pick Jon McGlocklin, have also been selected to an All-Star Game. Bob Weiss, the 22nd pick, also became a head coach after ending his playing career. He coached four NBA teams, most recently with the Seattle SuperSonics. Tal Brody, the 12th pick, never played in the NBA. He joined Israel I club Maccabi Tel Aviv in 1966 and played there until his retirement in 1980, winning several Israeli league titles and a European Cup Championship in 1977. He also became an Israeli citizen and played for Israeli national team. Aside from playing in the NBA, 20th pick Ron Reed also played professional baseball in the Major League Baseball (MLB). He ended his dual-sport career in 1967 to focus on baseball. He played 19 seasons in the MLB with three teams, winning the World Series once. He was also an MLB All-Star. He is one of only 12 athletes who have played in both NBA and MLB.

== Key ==
Pos.	G	F	C
Position	Guard	Forward	Center

^	Denotes player who has been inducted to the Naismith Memorial Basketball Hall of Fame
*	Denotes player who has been selected for at least one All-Star Game and All-NBA Team
^{+}	Denotes player who has been selected for at least one All-Star Game
^{#}	Denotes player who has never appeared in an NBA regular-season or playoff game
^{~}	Denotes player who has been selected as Rookie of the Year

== Draft ==
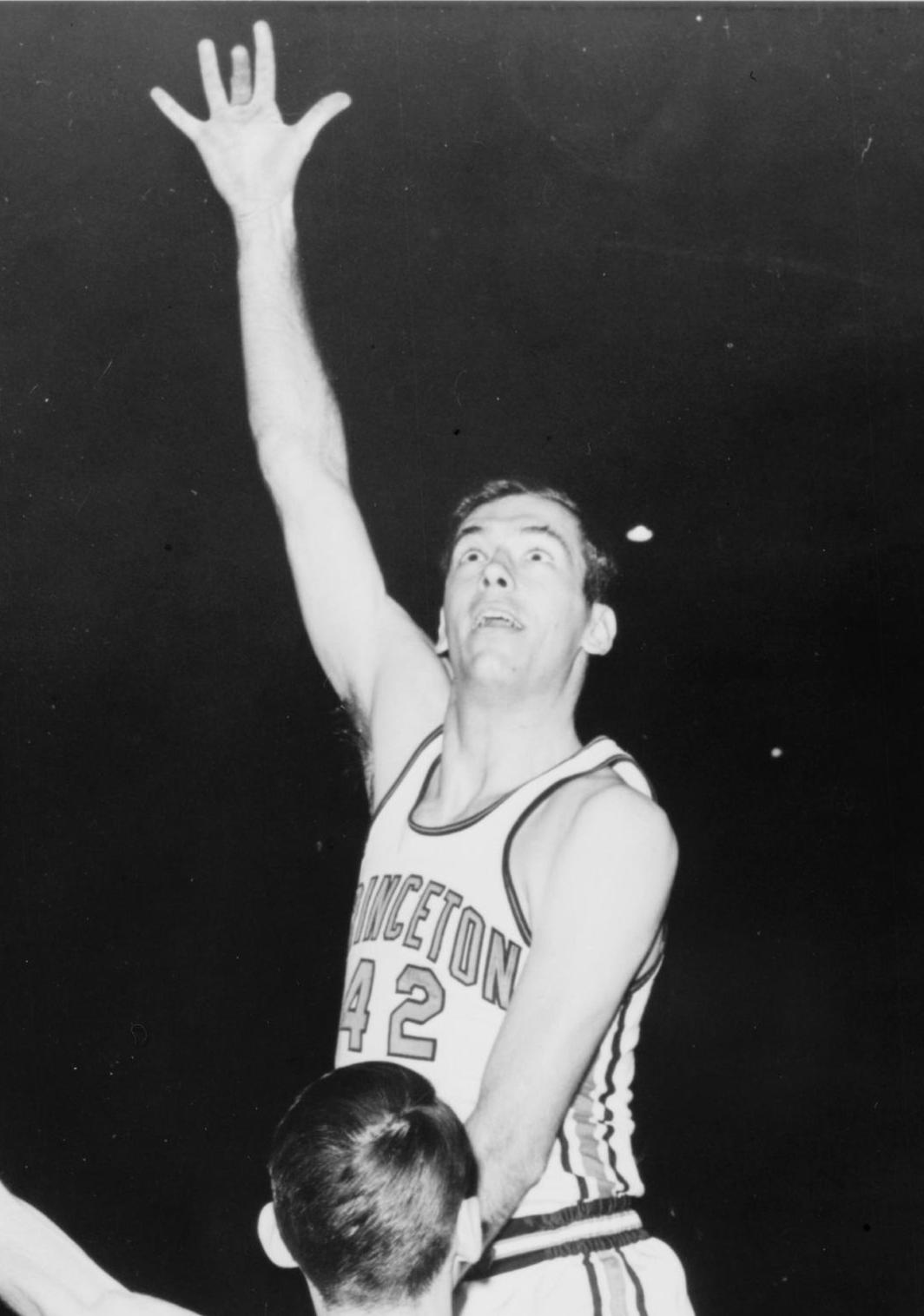
Bill Bradley was the New York Knicks' territorial pick.

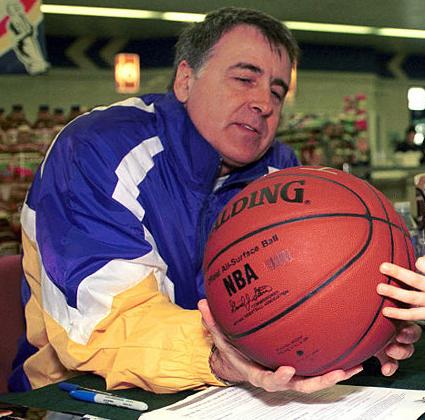
Gail Goodrich was the Los Angeles Lakers' territorial pick.

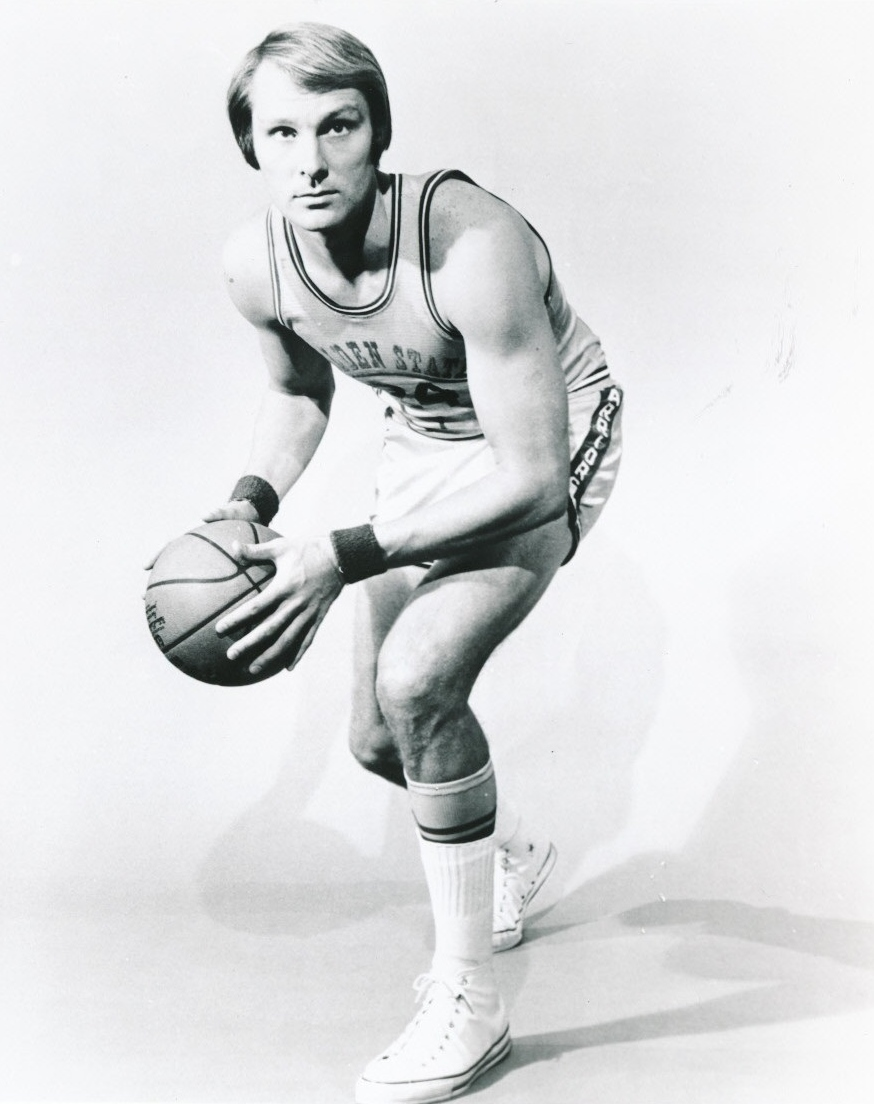
Rick Barry was the 2nd pick, selected by the San Francisco Warriors.

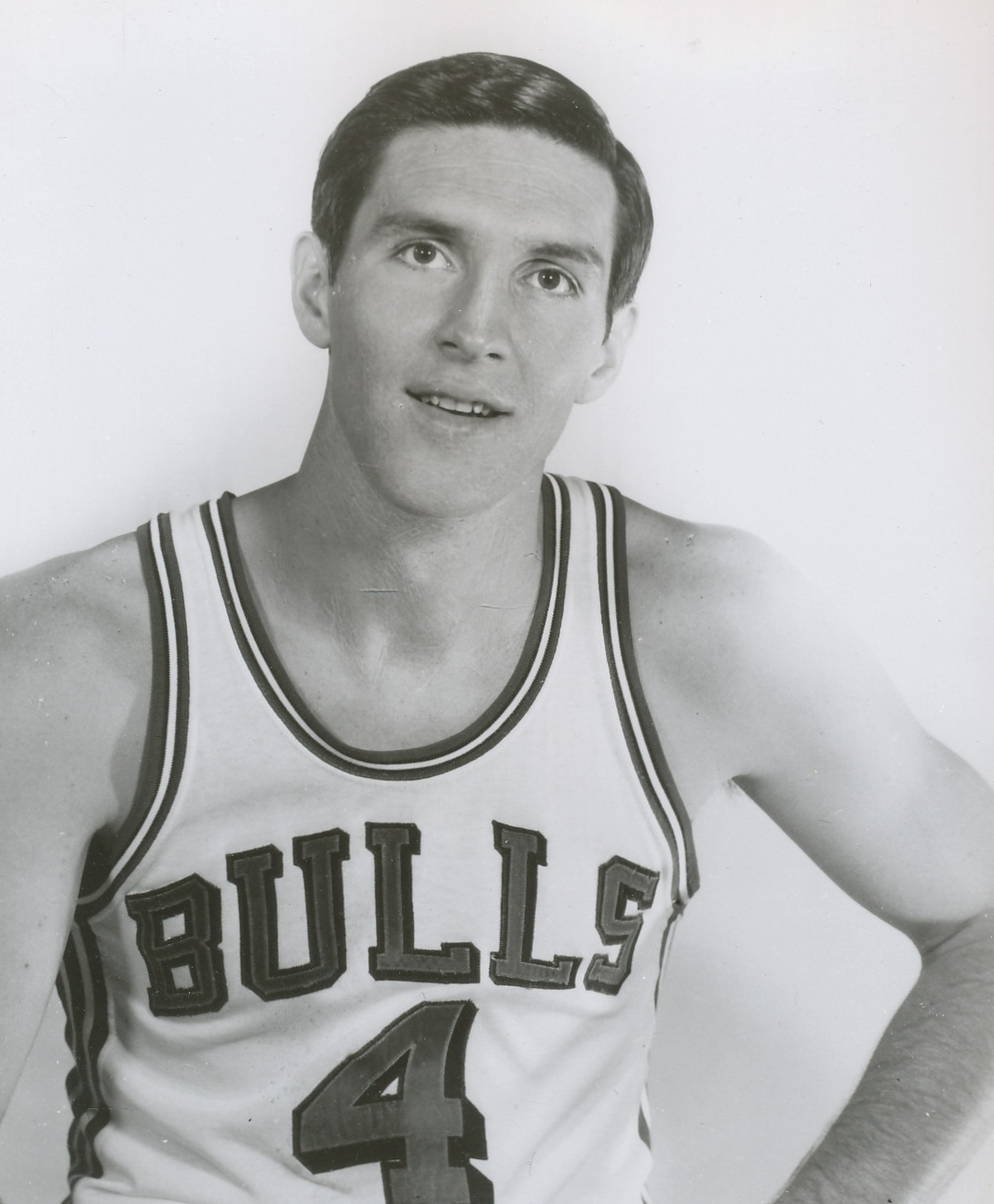
Jerry Sloan was the 4th pick and selected by the Baltimore Bullets.

Rnd.	Pick	Player	Pos.	Nationality (Note: Nationality indicates the player's national team or representative nationality. If a player has not competed at the international level, then the nationality indicates the national team which the player is eligible to represent according to FIBA rules.)	Team	School / club team
T	–	Bill Bradley^	G/F	United States	New York Knicks	Princeton (Sr.)
T	–	Bill Buntin	F/C	United States	Detroit Pistons	Michigan (Sr.)
T	–	Gail Goodrich^	G	United States	Los Angeles Lakers	UCLA (Sr.)
1	1	Fred Hetzel	F/C	United States	San Francisco Warriors	Davidson (Sr.)
1	2	Rick Barry^^{~}	F	United States	San Francisco Warriors	Miami (FL) (Sr.)
1	3	Dave Stallworth	F/C	United States	New York Knicks	Wichita State (Sr.)
1	4	Jerry Sloan^{^}	G/F	United States	Baltimore Bullets	Evansville (Sr.)
1	5	Billy Cunningham^	F/C	United States	Philadelphia 76ers	North Carolina (Sr.)
1	6	Jim Washington	F/C	United States	St. Louis Hawks	Villanova (Sr.)
1	7	Nate Bowman	C	United States	Cincinnati Royals	Wichita State (Sr.)
1	8	Ollie Johnson^{#}	C	United States	Boston Celtics	San Francisco (Sr.)
2	9	Wilbert Frazier	F/C	United States	San Francisco Warriors	Grambling (Sr.)
2	10	Dick Van Arsdale^{+}	G/F	United States	New York Knicks	Indiana (Sr.)
2	11	Tom Van Arsdale^{+}	G/F	United States	Detroit Pistons	Indiana (Sr.)
2	12	Tal Brody^{#}	G	United States	Baltimore Bullets	Illinois (Sr.)
2	13	Jesse Branson	F	United States	Philadelphia 76ers	Elon (Sr.)
2	14	Hal Blevins^{#}	G	United States	New York Knicks (from St. Louis)	Arkansas AM&N (Sr.)
2	15	Flynn Robinson^{+}	G	United States	Cincinnati Royals	Wyoming (Sr.)
2	16	John Fairchild	F	United States	Los Angeles Lakers	Brigham Young (Sr.)
2	17	Ron Watts	F	United States	Boston Celtics	Wake Forest (Sr.)
3	18	Keith Erickson	G/F	United States	San Francisco Warriors	UCLA (Sr.)
3	19	Barry Clemens	F	United States	New York Knicks	Ohio Wesleyan (Sr.)
3	20	Ron Reed	F	United States	Detroit Pistons	Notre Dame (Sr.)
3	21	Joe Newton^{#}	F	United States	Baltimore Bullets	Auburn (Sr.)
3	22	Bob Weiss	G	United States	Philadelphia 76ers	Pennsylvania State (Sr.)
3	23	Ken McIntyre^{#}	G	United States	St. Louis Hawks	St. John's (Sr.)
3	24	Jon McGlocklin^{+}	G/F	United States	Cincinnati Royals	Indiana (Sr.)
3	25	Jim Caldwell	C	United States	Los Angeles Lakers	Georgia Tech (Sr.)
3	26	Toby Kimball	F/C	United States	Boston Celtics	Connecticut (Sr.)
4	27	Warren Rustand^{#}	G	United States	San Francisco Warriors	Arizona (Sr.)
4	28	Larry Lembo^{#}	G	United States	New York Knicks	Manhattan (Sr.)
4	29	Jim King^{#}	F	United States	Detroit Pistons	Oklahoma State (Sr.)
4	30	Skip Thoren^{#}	C	United States	Baltimore Bullets	Illinois (Sr.)
4	31	Hank Finkel	C	United States	Philadelphia 76ers	Dayton (Jr.)
4	32	Lynn Nance^{#}	F	United States	St. Louis Hawks	Washington (Sr.)
4	33	Bob Love*	F	United States	Cincinnati Royals	Southern (Sr.)
4	34	Brooks Henderson^{#}	G	United States	Los Angeles Lakers	Florida (Sr.)
4	35	Richie Tarrant^{#}	G	United States	Boston Celtics	Saint Michael's (Sr.)
5	36	Eddie Jackson^{#}	C	United States	San Francisco Warriors	Oklahoma City (Sr.)
5	37	Steve Nisenson^{#}	G	United States	New York Knicks	Hofstra (Sr.)
5	38	Ted Manning^{#}	F	United States	Detroit Pistons	North Carolina College (Sr.)
5	39	Charles Dinkins^{#}	F	United States	Baltimore Bullets	Miami (Ohio) (Sr.)
5	40	Richie Moore^{#}	G	United States	Philadelphia 76ers	Villanova (Sr.)
5	41	Ted Werner^{#}	C	United States	St. Louis Hawks	Washington State (Sr.)
5	42	Warren Isaac^{#}	F	United States	Cincinnati Royals	Iona (Sr.)
5	43	A.W. Davis^{#}	F	United States	Los Angeles Lakers	Tennessee (Sr.)
5	44	Don Davidson^{#}	F	United States	Boston Celtics	Davidson (Sr.)
6	45	Jim Jarvis^{#}	G	United States	San Francisco Warriors	Oregon State (Sr.)
6	46	Warren Davis^{#}	F	United States	New York Knicks	Allentown Jets (EPBL)
6	47	Barry Smith^{#}	G	United States	Detroit Pistons	High Point (Sr.)
6	48	Lyvonne LeFlore^{#}	F	United States	Baltimore Bullets	Jackson State (Sr.)
6	49	Mitch Edwards^{#}	F	United States	Philadelphia 76ers	Pan American (Sr.)
6	50	John Rambo^{#}	F	United States	St. Louis Hawks	Long Beach State (Sr.)
6	51	Leon Clements^{#}	F	United States	Cincinnati Royals	Ouachita Baptist (Sr.)
6	52	Teófilo Cruz^{#}	F	Puerto Rico	Los Angeles Lakers	Seattle (Sr.)
6	53	Haskell Tison^{#}	C	United States	Boston Celtics	Duke (Sr.)
7	54	Don Wolthers^{#}	F	United States	San Francisco Warriors	California (Sr.)
7	55	Dale Neel^{#}	F	United States	New York Knicks	High Point (Sr.)
7	56	Willie Somerset	G	United States	Baltimore Bullets	Duquesne (Sr.)
7	57	John Young^{#}	F	United States	Philadelphia 76ers	Midwestern (Sr.)
7	58	Terry Kunze^{#}	G	United States	St. Louis Hawks	Minnesota (Sr.)
7	59	Jeff Gehring^{#}	F	United States	Cincinnati Royals	Miami (Ohio) (Sr.)
7	60	DeWayne Cruse^{#}	F	United States	Los Angeles Lakers	Idaho State (Sr.)
7	61	George Deehan^{#}	F	United States	Boston Celtics	Lenoir–Rhyne (Sr.)
8	62	Willie Cotton^{#}	F	United States	San Francisco Warriors	Central Oklahoma (Sr.)
8	63	Frank Granat^{#}	C	United States	New York Knicks	Missionary Training Institute (Sr.)
8	64	Jim Murphy^{#}	G	United States	Baltimore Bullets	DePaul (Sr.)
8	65	Bob Barnek^{#}	G	United States	Philadelphia 76ers	St. Bonaventure (Sr.)
8	66	Cincy Powell^{#}	F	United States	St. Louis Hawks	Portland (Sr.)
8	67	Jim Fox	F/C	United States	Cincinnati Royals	South Carolina (Sr.)
8	68	George Unseld^{#}	F	United States	Los Angeles Lakers	Kansas (Sr.)
9	69	Jay Neary^{#}	G	United States	New York Knicks	UNC Wilmington (Sr.)
9	70	John Wendelken^{#}	G	United States	Baltimore Bullets	Holy Cross (Sr.)
9	71	Gene West^{#}	F	United States	Philadelphia 76ers	Drake (Sr.)
9	72	LeRoy Walker^{#}	G	United States	St. Louis Hawks	Utah State (Sr.)
9	73	Ron Krick^{#}	F	United States	Cincinnati Royals	Cincinnati (Sr.)
9	74	Mal Pradd^{#}	G	United States	Los Angeles Lakers	Dillard (Sr.)
10	75	Wayne Molis	F	United States	New York Knicks	Lewis (Sr.)
10	76	Bogie Redmon^{#}	F	United States	Baltimore Bullets	Illinois (Sr.)
10	77	Dean Church^{#}	G	United States	Philadelphia 76ers	Southwestern Louisiana (Sr.)
10	78	Spencer Carlson^{#}	F	United States	St. Louis Hawks	Baylor (Sr.)
10	79	Richie Dec^{#}	G	United States	Cincinnati Royals	Seton Hall (Sr.)
10	80	Don Rae^{#}	F	United States	Los Angeles Lakers	Montana State (Sr.)
11	81	Bill Meyer^{#}	G	United States	New York Knicks	Hiram (Sr.)
11	82	Thales McReynolds	G	United States	Baltimore Bullets	Miles (Sr.)
11	83	Curt Fromal^{#}	G	United States	Philadelphia 76ers	La Salle (Sr.)
11	84	Weldon Kytle^{#}	F	United States	St. Louis Hawks	Fenn (Sr.)
11	85	Dick Maile^{#}	F	United States	Cincinnati Royals	LSU (Sr.)
11	86	Bob Andrews^{#}	F	United States	Los Angeles Laker	Alabama (Sr.)
12	87	Bob Trupin^{#}	G	United States	New York Knicks	Yale (Sr.)
12	88	Walt Sahm^{#}	F	United States	Baltimore Bullets	Notre Dame (Sr.)
12	89	Dan Anderson^{#}	C	United States	Philadelphia 76ers	Augsburg (Sr.)
12	90	Elton McGriff^{#}	C	United States	St. Louis Hawks	Creighton (Sr.)
12	91	Robert McCollough^{#}	G	United States	Cincinnati Royals	Benedict (Sr.)
13	92	Dennis McGovern^{#}	G	United States	New York Knicks	Rhode Island (Sr.)
13	93	Joe Ramsey^{#}	G	United States	Baltimore Bullets	Southern Illinois (Sr.)
13	94	Rick Park^{#}	G	United States	Philadelphia 76ers	Tulsa (Sr.)
13	95	Mel Northway^{#}	F	United States	St. Louis Hawks	Minnesota (Sr.)
13	96	Oliver Jones^{#}	F	United States	Cincinnati Royals	Albany State (Sr.)
14	97	Jerry Rook^{#}	G	United States	Baltimore Bullets	Arkansas State (Sr.)
14	98	Jack Margenthaler^{#}	G	United States	Philadelphia 76ers	Houston (Sr.)
14	99	Terry Page^{#}	G	United States	St. Louis Hawks	Detroit Mercy (Sr.)
14	100	Larry Franks^{#}	F	United States	Cincinnati Royals	Texas (Sr.)
15	101	Dave Hicks^{#}	F	United States	Baltimore Bullets	Middletown Oilers (NEBA)
15	102	James Pitts^{#}	G	United States	Philadelphia 76ers	Georgia (Sr.)
15	103	George Pomey^{#}	G	United States	St. Louis Hawks	Michigan (Sr.)
15	104	Ronald Scharf^{#}	G	United States	Cincinnati Royals	Georgia Tech (Sr.)
16	105	Bunk Adams^{#}	G	United States	Baltimore Bullets	U.S. Armed Forces (AAU)
16	106	Larry Rafferty^{#}	G	United States	Philadelphia 76ers	New York Athletic Club
16	107	Bob Tolan^{#}	F	United States	St. Louis Hawks	Eastern Kentucky (Sr.)
16	108	Willie Porter^{#}	F	United States	Cincinnati Royals	Stoop's All-Stars (AAU)
17	109	Roger Taylor^{#}	G	United States	Baltimore Bullets	Philadelphia (EBL)

== Notable undrafted players ==
These players were not selected in the 1965 draft but played at least one game in the NBA.

Player	Pos.	Nationality	School/club team
Jay Miller	F	United States	Notre Dame (Sr.)

== Notes ==
1: Tal Brody was born in the United States and became an Israeli citizen in 1970. He has represented both United States and Israel in international basketball competitions.

== See also ==
- List of first overall NBA draft picks
