= Jerry Pettway =

American basketball player

Personal information
- Born: February 13, 1944 (age 82) Detroit, Michigan, U.S.
- Listed height: 6 ft 3 in (1.91 m)
- Listed weight: 185 lb (84 kg)

Career information
- High school: Northern (Detroit, Michigan)
- College: Northwood (MI) (1963–1967)
- NBA draft: 1967: 14th round, 144th overall pick
- Drafted by: Cincinnati Royals
- Position: Shooting guard
- Number: 21

Career history
- 1967–1969: Houston Mavericks
- Stats at Basketball Reference

Jerry Pettway is an American former basketball player in the American Basketball Association (ABA).

Pettway was born in Detroit, Michigan on February 13, 1944. He played college basketball at Northwood Institute from 1963 to 1967. He is Northwood's all-time leading scorer and rebounder and is a member of that school's Hall of Fame.

Pettway was drafted in the 16th round of the 1967 NBA draft by the Cincinnati Royals but played professional basketball for the other team that drafted him, the Houston Mavericks of the American Basketball Association prior to the ABA–NBA merger.
