= Art Becker =

American basketball player and coach (1942–2026)

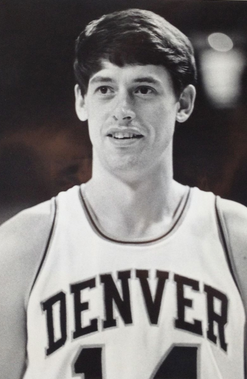

Personal information
- Born: January 12, 1942 Akron, Ohio, U.S.
- Died: April 30, 2026 (aged 84) Tempe, Arizona, U.S.
- Listed height: 6 ft 7 in (2.01 m)
- Listed weight: 205 lb (93 kg)

Career information
- High school: Camelback (Phoenix, Arizona)
- College: Arizona State (1961–1964)
- NBA draft: 1964: 3rd round, 22nd overall pick
- Drafted by: St. Louis Hawks
- Playing career: 1967–1973
- Positions: Power forward, small forward
- Number: 34, 43, 14

Career history
- 1967–1969: Houston Mavericks
- 1969–1971: Indiana Pacers
- 1971–1972: Denver Rockets
- 1972: New York Nets
- 1972: Dallas Chaparrals

Career highlights
- ABA champion (1970); 2× ABA All-Star (1968, 1972); First-team All-WAC (1963); Second-team All-WAC (1964)

Career ABA statistics
- Points: 5,160 (12.5 ppg)
- Rebounds: 2,604 (6.3 rpg)
- Assists: 410 (1.0)
- Stats at Basketball Reference

Arthur C. Becker (January 12, 1942 – April 30, 2026) was an American professional basketball player born in Akron, Ohio.

A 6 ft 7 in (2.01 m) forward from Arizona State University, Becker played six seasons (1967–1973) in the American Basketball Association (ABA) as a member of the Houston Mavericks, Indiana Pacers, Denver Rockets, Dallas Chaparrals, and New York Nets. He averaged 12.5 points per game over the course of his career and appeared in two ABA All-Star Games.

From 2005, Becker served as president of the National Junior College Athletic Association (NJCAA). He also served two stints (1974–1981; 1993–1996) as men's head basketball coach at Scottsdale Community College and coached men's tennis at Scottsdale from 1981 to 1983.

Becker died under hospice care at his home in Tempe, Arizona, on April 30, 2026, at the age of 84. He had battled prostate cancer for 25 years and had recently been diagnosed with leukemia.

== Sources ==
- Career statistics from Basketball Reference
- NJCAA profile
