= Jim Weaver (basketball) =

American basketball coach (1919–1992)

Biographical details
- Born: January 19, 1919; Chicago, Illinois, U.S.
- Died: November 21, 1992 (aged 73); Ocala, Florida, U.S.

Playing career
- 1939–1942: DePaul

Coaching career (HC unless noted)
- 1942–1943: DePaul (freshmen)
- 1947–1951: St. Patrick HS (IL)
- 1951–1955: St. Mel HS
- 1955–1962: Saint Mary's
- 1968–1969: Houston Mavericks

Administrative career (AD unless noted)
- 1955–1962: Saint Mary's

Head coaching record
- Overall: 110–69 (.615) (College); 20–46 (.303) (ABA)
- Tournaments: 1–1 (.500) (NCAA)

Accomplishments and honors

Championships
- 2x Chicago Catholic League champion (1949, 1954); 1x Chicago city champion (1954)

Awards
- 1x WCAC coach of the year (1959)

James Edward Weaver (January 9, 1919 – November 21, 1992) was an American basketball coach who was the head coach of the Saint Mary's Gaels men's basketball team from 1955 to 1962 and the Houston Mavericks of the American Basketball Association from 1968 to 1969.

== Biography ==
Weaver played center for the DePaul Blue Demons men's basketball team from 1939 to 1942. He then served as coach of DePaul's freshman basketball team, but left after one season to enter the United States Armed Forces. He served in the United States Army Air Forces and was a player-coach at Hamilton Field. He graduated from DePaul in 1947 with a Bachelor of Science in business.

From 1947 to 1951, he was the head coach at St. Patrick High School. His team captured the Chicago Catholic League title in 1949. In 1951, he succeeded John Dee as the basketball coach at St. Mel High School. His 1953–54 team won all four of Chicago's major high school basketball championships – the St. George Holiday Tournament, North Division Catholic title, the Chicago Catholic League championship, and the Chicago City championship. They returned to the city championship the following season, but lost to DuSable High School in the title game.

In 1955, Weaver succeeded the retiring Thomas Foley as head coach at Saint Mary's College of California. In 1959, he was named the West Coast Athletic Conference coach of the year after leading the Gaels to a 19–6 record and an appearance in the NCAA University Division basketball tournament. The following season, a feud between Weaver and his freshman coach, Bob Hagler, became public. The university sided with Weaver and Hagler's contract was not renewed. On January 17, 1962, Weaver announced he would leave the school when his contract expired that June. Although he did not give a reason for his departure, United Press International reported that issues with alumni, some of whom had tried to oust Weaver in favor of Hagler in 1960, played a part in his leaving. He won his final game on March 10, 1962, and was carried off the court by his players. Weaver finished his career at St. Mary's with a 110–69 and had only one losing season.

After leaving St. Mary's, Weaver worked in real estate in the San Francisco Bay Area. In 1968, he was hired to coach the Houston Mavericks of the American Basketball Association. Weaver, who was a close friend of ABA commissioner George Mikan, replaced Slater Martin, who resigned after the league took control of the financially struggling club. The Mavericks went 20–46 under Weaver and missed the 1969 ABA playoffs. At the end of the season, the team was sold to Jim Gardner, who relocated the team to North Carolina and did not retain Weaver as coach.
