= DeWitt Menyard =

American basketball player

Personal information
- Born: May 24, 1944 Columbus, Mississippi, U.S.
- Died: May 21, 2009 (aged 64)
- Listed height: 6 ft 10 in (2.08 m)
- Listed weight: 210 lb (95 kg)

Career information
- High school: South Bend Central (South Bend, Indiana)
- College: Allan Hancock (1963–1965); Utah (1965–1967)
- NBA draft: 1967: undrafted
- Position: Center
- Number: 14

Career history
- 1967–1968: Houston Mavericks

Career highlights
- ABA All-Star (1968)
- Stats at Basketball Reference

DeWitt Menyard (May 24, 1944 – May 21, 2009) was an American professional basketball player.

A 6'10" center from the University of Utah, Menyard played one season (1967–68) in the American Basketball Association (ABA) as a member of the Houston Mavericks. He averaged 9.1 points per game and 7.8 rebounds per game and appeared in the 1968 ABA All-Star Game.
