= 1968–69 ABA season =

- League: American Basketball Association
- Sport: Basketball
- Duration: October 18, 1968 – May 7, 1969
- Games: 78
- Teams: 11

Regular season
- Top seed: Oakland Oaks
- Season MVP: Mel Daniels (Indiana)
- Top scorer: Larry Jones (Denver)

Playoffs
- Eastern champions: Indiana Pacers
- Eastern runners-up: Miami Floridians
- Western champions: Oakland Oaks
- Western runners-up: New Orleans Buccaneers

Finals
- Champions: Oakland Oaks
- Runners-up: Indiana Pacers

ABA seasons
- ← 1967–68 1969–70 →

The 1968–69 ABA season was the second season for the American Basketball Association. Two teams relocated: Minnesota Muskies became the Miami Floridians, while the Pittsburgh Pipers moved to Minnesota and became the Minnesota Pipers. Two others relocated within their territory, with the Anaheim Amigos becoming the Los Angeles Stars and the New Jersey Americans became the New York Nets. These moves to perceived better locations, alongside the arrival of Rick Barry to play with the Oakland Oaks, led the league having optimism for its second season. The season ended with the Oakland Oaks capturing the first ABA championship. Months later, the Oaks elected to relocate to Washington, D.C. with the purchase of the team by Earl Foreman.

Coaching changes
Offseason
Team	1967–68 coach	1968–69 coach
Los Angeles Stars	Harry Dinnel	Bill Sharman
Minnesota Pipers	Vince Cazzetta	Jim Harding
Oakland Oaks	Bruce Hale	Alex Hannum
In-season
Team	Outgoing coach	Incoming coach
Houston Mavericks	Slater Martin	Jim Weaver
Indiana Pacers	Larry Staverman	Bobby Leonard
Minnesota Pipers	Jim Harding; Vern Mikkelsen	Vern Mikkelsen; Gus Young

== Teams ==
1968–69 American Basketball Association
Division	Team	City	Arena	Capacity
Eastern	Indiana Pacers	Indianapolis, Indiana	Indiana State Fair Coliseum	10,000
Eastern	Kentucky Colonels	Louisville, Kentucky	Louisville Convention Center	6,000
Eastern	Miami Floridians	Miami Beach, Florida	Miami Beach Convention Center	15,000
Eastern	Minnesota Pipers	Bloomington, Minnesota	Metropolitan Sports Center	15,000
Eastern	New York Nets	Commack, New York	Long Island Arena	6,000
Western	Dallas Chaparrals	University Park, Texas; Dallas, Texas	Moody Coliseum; Dallas Memorial Auditorium	8,998; 9,815
Western	Denver Rockets	Denver, Colorado	Denver Auditorium Arena	6,841
Western	Houston Mavericks	Houston, Texas	Sam Houston Coliseum	9,200
Western	Los Angeles Stars	Los Angeles, California	Los Angeles Sports Arena	14,795
Western	New Orleans Buccaneers	New Orleans, Louisiana	Loyola Field House	6,500
Western	Oakland Oaks	Oakland, California	Oakland-Alameda County Coliseum Arena	13,502

=== Map of teams ===
Eastern Division Western Division

== Regular season ==
On April 5, 1969, prior to the ABA Playoffs, Mel Daniels was named ABA Most Valuable Player, with the margin being reported as being two votes over Connie Hawkins (others to receive votes were Larry Jones, James Jones, Rick Barry, Don Freeman, Warren Armstrong, Louie Dampier, Roger Brown, and Doug Moe).

== Final standings ==
=== Eastern Division ===
Team	W	L	PCT.	GB
Indiana Pacers *	44	34	.564	—
Miami Floridians *	43	35	.551	1
Kentucky Colonels *	42	36	.538	2
Minnesota Pipers *	36	42	.462	8
New York Nets	17	61	.218	27

=== Western Division ===
Team	W	L	PCT.	GB
**Oakland Oaks** *	60	18	.769	—
New Orleans Buccaneers *	46	32	.590	14
Denver Rockets *	44	34	.564	16
Dallas Chaparrals *	41	37	.526	19
Los Angeles Stars	33	45	.423	27
Houston Mavericks	23	55	.295	37

Asterisk (*) denotes playoff team

Bold – ABA champions

== Playoffs ==
The Oakland Oaks beat the Indiana Pacers 4-1 to win the ABA Championship.

== Awards and honors ==
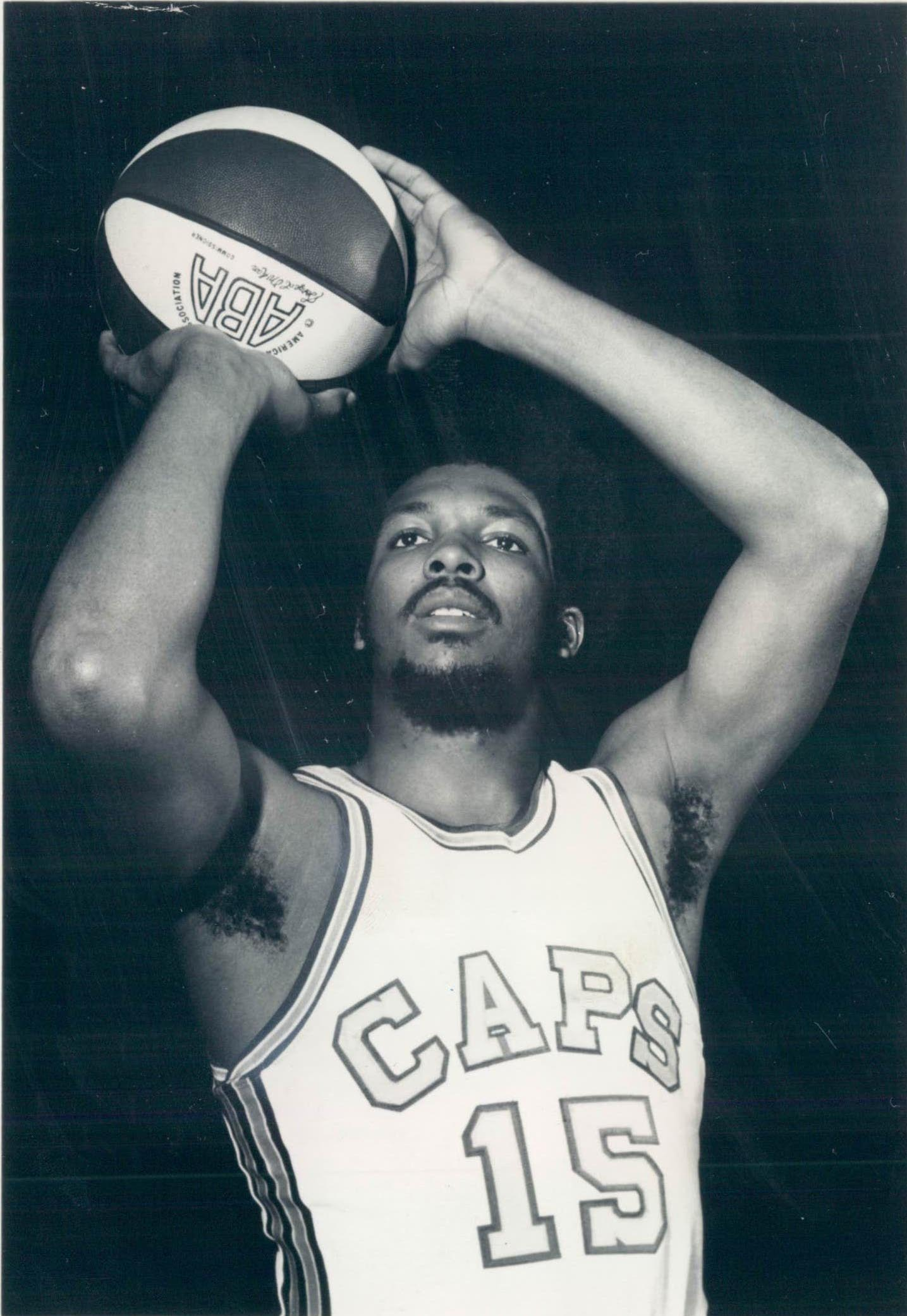
Warren Jabali (Oakland) won the 1968–69 ABA Playoffs MVP

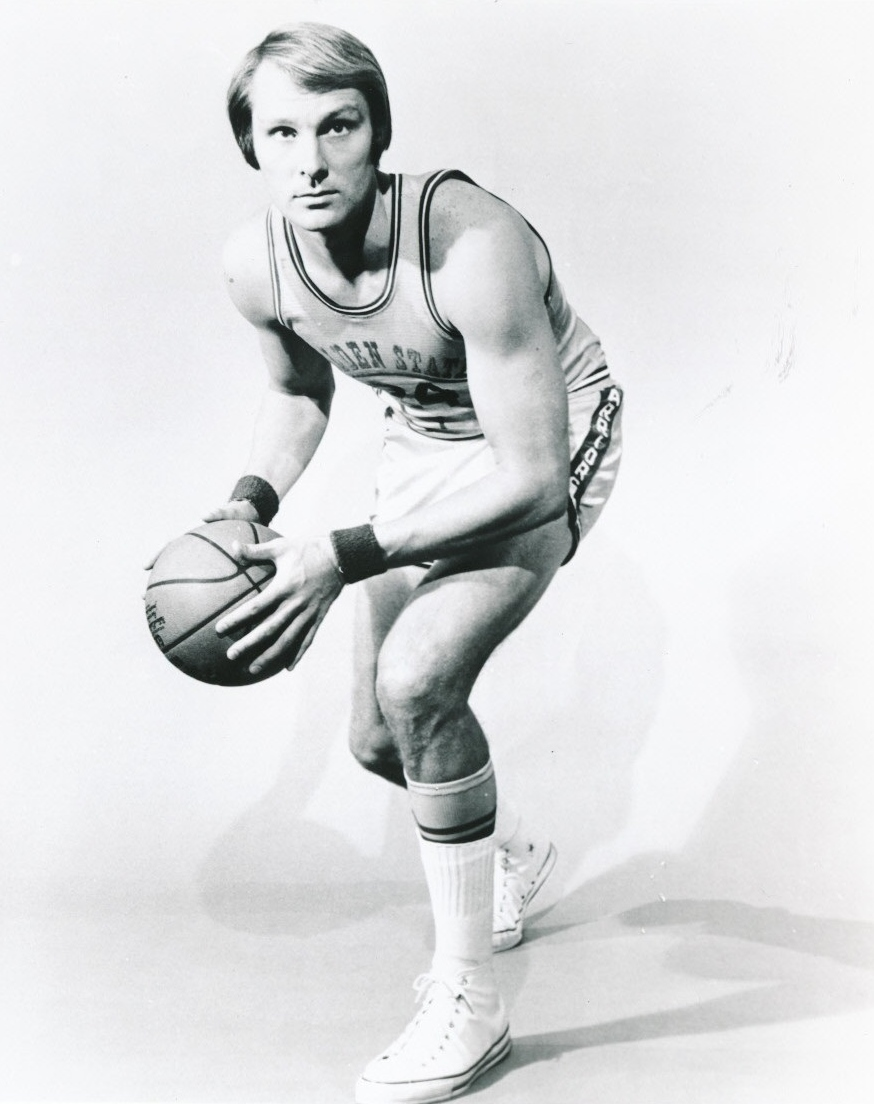
Rick Barry (Oakland) was named All-ABA First Team

- ABA Most Valuable Player Award: Mel Daniels, Indiana Pacers
- Rookie of the Year: Warren Jabali, Oakland Oaks
- Coach of the Year: Alex Hannum, Oakland Oaks
- Playoffs MVP: Warren Jabali, Oakland Oaks
- All-Star Game MVP: John Beasley, Dallas Chaparrals
- **All-ABA First Team**
  - Connie Hawkins, Minnesota Pipers (2nd selection)
  - Rick Barry, Oakland Oaks
  - Mel Daniels, Indiana Pacers (2nd selection)
  - Jimmy Jones, New Orleans Buccaneers
  - Larry Jones, Denver Rockets (2nd selection)
- **All-ABA Second Team**
  - John Beasley, Dallas Chaparrals (2nd selection)
  - Doug Moe, Oakland Oaks (1st Second Team selection, 2nd overall selection)
  - Red Robbins, New Orleans Buccaneers
  - Donnie Freeman, Miami Floridians
  - Louie Dampier, Kentucky Colonels
- **All-Rookie Team**
  - Ron Boone, Dallas Chaparrals
  - Warren Jabali, Oakland Oaks
  - Larry Miller, Los Angeles Stars
  - Gene Moore, Kentucky Colonels
  - Walter Piatkowski, Denver Rockets

== See also ==
- 1969 ABA Playoffs
