= Houston Mavericks =

- Conference: None
- Division: Western Division
- Founded: 1967
- History: Houston Mavericks; 1967–1969; Carolina Cougars; 1969–1974; Spirits of St. Louis; 1974–1976
- Arena: Sam Houston Coliseum
- Location: Houston, Texas
- Team colors: Gold, Blue
- Head coach: Slater Martin (1967–68); Art Becker (interim, 1968–69); Jim Weaver (1969)
- Ownership: T. C. Morrow (1967–1968); Jim Gardner (1968–1969)
- Championships: 0
- Conference titles: no conference play in ABA
- Division titles: 0

The Houston Mavericks were a charter member of the American Basketball Association (ABA). They played in the upstart league's first two seasons, from 1967 to 1969. Their home arena was the Sam Houston Coliseum. In 1947–48, there was an unrelated Mavericks franchise based in Houston as part of the Professional Basketball League of America.

== Origins ==
The Mavericks were one of the first ABA franchises, announced on February 2, 1967, when the ABA was formed. They were owned by businessman T. C. Morrow after he took over Cloyce Box's majority shares of the team. One of the minority partners was Bud Adams, who owned the Houston Oilers of the American Football League (later the National Football League following the AFL–NFL merger). Houston native and former NBA great Slater Martin was hired as general manager and head coach.

== 1967–68 season ==
The Mavericks got off to an inauspicious start during the first ABA draft. Martin arrived in Oakland to represent the team, only to find out that Morrow and his group hadn't sent the required $30,000 bond. By the time Martin was able to get the money through other channels, he'd missed the first four rounds and was forced to recruit players from the Eastern Professional Basketball League (later known as the Continental Basketball Association). He picked up some players from nearby colleges to round out the roster.

Not surprisingly, given the rough start, the Mavericks had a somewhat mediocre season, finishing 29–49, good for fourth place in the Western Division. However, this was enough for them to squeak into the playoffs. They went down rather meekly to the Dallas Chaparrals in the Western Division semifinals, losing three games to none.

Willie Somerset and DeWitt Menyard of the Mavericks played in the ABA All-Star Game.

Houstonians viewed the Mavericks largely with indifference. Average attendance was listed as 1,543, easily the worst in the league. It took some effort to even get to that low figure; the team was lucky to attract 500 fans on most nights.

== 1968–69 season ==
Morrow was one of the wealthier owners in the league, and was initially willing to stick it out. He ran the team rather cheaply in the inaugural season, but made considerable effort in the offseason to improve the team. He pursued Houston Cougars stars Elvin Hayes and Don Chaney, but they both opted for the NBA instead. Morrow gave up in midseason and returned the Mavericks to the league.

ABA commissioner George Mikan was concerned enough about the situation in Houston that he sent the Mavericks several players in hopes of making them more attractive to fans. However, Martin, who had previously teamed up with Mikan on the Minneapolis Lakers during the 1940s and 1950s, didn't appreciate this intervention from the league office and resigned a month into the season. Art Becker served as player-coach for a few games until Jim Weaver, a personal friend of Mikan, took over for the rest of the campaign.

The team's already low attendance dropped even further. Average attendance was officially reported as 1,147, the worst in the league. However, it was almost certainly lower than that; many observers reported seeing "crowds" in double digits. According to most reliable sources, the Mavericks padded the gate for most of the early-season games to make the attendance figures look more respectable than they actually were. As the season wore on, however, the Mavericks were less willing to embellish their attendance. During the last three months of the season, they attracted well under 400 fans per game.

Not surprisingly, the Mavericks were wretched on the court, finishing with a record of 23–55, second-worst in the league. However, the season was not without individual highlights. Willie Somerset again played in the ABA All-Star Game. The Houston Mavericks played their final game on April 2, 1969, before only 89 fans (announced attendance), defeating the New York Nets 149–132. The 149 points was an all-time high for the Mavericks; the 89 fans was an all-time low. Another notable mark during the season was the Mavericks hitting 43 consecutive free throws. The streak began with 7 straight in a double overtime victory over the Minnesota Pipers on January 16, 1969. The next night on the road against the New York Nets the Mavericks went 36 of 36 from the line. The streak ended with the team's first free throw against the Kentucky Colonels on January 18, 1969. The free throw streak and mark for a single game remain to this day as unbroken professional basketball records.

== Aftermath ==
During the 1968–69 season, the league sold the team to a group led by Jim Gardner, who intended to move the team to North Carolina. However, he agreed to finish the season in Houston first. The public relations man for the ABA, Lee Meade, would claim that Gardner's agreement to take on the Mavericks for the season before moving them to North Carolina helped save the league that season since Denver Rockets owner Bill Ringsby wanted to leave the ABA following Morrow's own announcement of him exiting the ABA (Morrow was one of the richest owners in the ABA at the time alongside Ringsby) before the Indiana Pacers' owner Dick Tinkham convinced him to stay put and get Gardner to agree to the deal himself. Shortly after the season ended, Gardner moved the team to North Carolina as the Carolina Cougars. After a few years in North Carolina, the team moved to St. Louis and competed as the Spirits of St. Louis. After the 1975–76 season, the Spirits announced that the franchise would move to Salt Lake City to play as the Utah Rockies, but the ABA–NBA merger did not include the Spirits/Rockies or the Kentucky Colonels and the franchises disbanded, with its players being put into a dispersal draft.

Houston would have a more successful attempt at big-time basketball when the National Basketball Association (NBA)'s Rockets arrived from San Diego. However, the Rockets were consigned to vagabond status for their first four years in Houston after declaring Sam Houston Coliseum unsuitable even for temporary use. They finally moved into their new arena, The Summit (later known as the Compaq Center) in 1975. While at The Summit, the Rockets achieved their greatest success in the 1980s and 1990s, winning two championships in the latter decade. Since 2002, the Rockets have played their home games at the Toyota Center.

The team's name, Mavericks, would later be used by Dallas' expansion team when they joined the NBA during the 1980–81 NBA season. (Coincidentally, Dallas was the hometown of the ABA's Dallas Chaparrals, who later became the San Antonio Spurs.)

== Basketball Hall of Famers ==
Houston Mavericks Hall of Famers
Coaches
Name	Position	Tenure	Inducted
Slater Martin ^{1}	Head coach	1967–1968	1982

Notes:

- ^{1} Inducted as a player. Never played for the franchise.

== Season-by-season ==
Season	League	Division	Regular Season				Postseason results
Season	League	Division	Finish	Wins	Losses	Pct.	Postseason results
Houston Mavericks
1967–68	ABA	Western	4th	29	49	.372	Lost Division Semifinals (Chaparrals) 0–3
1968–69	ABA	Western	6th	23	55	.295	

== External sources ==
- Remember the ABA page on the Houston Mavericks
