= Washington Wizards draft history =

The Washington Wizards (formerly known as the Chicago Packers, the Chicago Zephyrs, the Baltimore Bullets, the Capital Bullets, and the Washington Bullets) have selected the following players in the National Basketball Association Draft.

== Key ==
Naismith Basketball Hall of Famer	First overall NBA draft pick	Selected for an NBA All-Star Game

== As Washington Wizards (1997–present) ==
Year	Round	Pick	Player	College/High School/Club
2026	1	1	AJ Dybantsa	BYU
2025	1	6	Tre Johnson III	Texas
2024	1	2	Alex Sarr	Perth Wildcats
2024	1	14	Bub Carrington	Pittsburgh
2024	1	24	Kyshawn George	Miami (Florida)
2023	1	8	Jarace Walker	University of Houston
2023	2	42	Tristan Vukčević	Partizan Belgrade (Serbia)
2023	2	57	Trayce Jackson-Davis	Indiana University
2022	1	10	Johnny Davis	University of Wisconsin
2022	2	54	Yannick Nzosa	Unicaja (Spain)
2021	1	15	Corey Kispert	Gonzaga University
2020	1	9	Deni Avdija	Maccabi Tel Aviv (Israel)
2020	2	37	Vít Krejčí	Casademont Zaragoza (Spain)
2019	1	9	Rui Hachimura	Gonzaga University
2018	1	15	Troy Brown Jr.	University of Oregon
2018	2	44	Issuf Sanon	Olimpija Ljubljana (Slovenia)
2015	1	19	Jerian Grant	University of Notre Dame
2015	2	49	Aaron White	University of Iowa
2014	2	46	Jordan Clarkson	University of Missouri
2013	1	3	Otto Porter	Georgetown University
2013	2	54	Arsalan Kazemi	University of Oregon
2012	1	3	Bradley Beal	University of Florida
2012	2	32	Tomáš Satoranský	Banca Cívica (Spain)
2011	1	6	Jan Veselý	Partizan (Serbia)
2011	1	18	Chris Singleton	Florida State University
2011	2	34	Shelvin Mack	Butler University
2010	1	1	John Wall	University of Kentucky
2010	1	30	Lazar Hayward	Marquette University
2010	2	35	Nemanja Bjelica	Red Star Belgrade (Serbia)
2009	2	32	Jermaine Taylor	University of Central Florida
2008	1	18	JaVale McGee	University of Nevada, Reno
2008	2	47	Henry Walker	Kansas State University
2007	1	16	Nick Young	University of Southern California
2007	2	47	Dominic McGuire	California State University, Fresno
2006	1	18	Oleksiy Pecherov	BC Kyiv (Ukraine)
2006	2	48	Vladimir Veremeenko	Dynamo St. Petersburg (Russia)
2005	2	49	Andray Blatche	South Kent School
2004	1	5	Devin Harris	University of Wisconsin–Madison
2004	2	32	Peter John Ramos	Caguas Creoles (Puerto Rico)
2003	1	10	Jarvis Hayes	University of Georgia
2003	2	38	Steve Blake	University of Maryland
2002	1	11	Jared Jeffries	Indiana University
2002	1	17	Juan Dixon	University of Maryland
2002	2	38	Rod Grizzard	University of Alabama
2002	2	39	Juan Carlos Navarro	FC Barcelona (Spain)
2001	1	1	Kwame Brown	Glynn Academy
2000	2	35	Mike Smith	University of Louisiana at Monroe
1999	1	7	Richard Hamilton	University of Connecticut
1999	2	35	Calvin Booth	Pennsylvania State University
1998	2	43	Jahidi White	Georgetown University

== As Washington Bullets (1974–1996) ==
Year	Round	Pick	Name	From
1997	2	45	God Shammgod	Providence College
1997	2	48	Predrag Drobnjak	Partizan (Serbia)
1996	2	55	Ronnie Henderson	Louisiana State University
1995	1	4	Rasheed Wallace	University of North Carolina
1995	2	32	Terrence Rencher	University of Texas at Austin
1994	1	5	Juwan Howard	University of Michigan
1994	2	32	Jim McIlvaine	Marquette University
1993	1	6	Calbert Cheaney	Indiana University
1993	2	30	Gheorghe Mureșan	Pau-Orthez (France)
1993	2	38	Conrad McRae	Syracuse University
1992	1	6	Tom Gugliotta	North Carolina State University
1992	2	32	Brent Price	University of Oklahoma
1991	1	19	LaBradford Smith	University of Louisville
1990	2	35	Greg Foster	University of Texas at El Paso
1990	2	37	A. J. English	Virginia Union University
1989	1	9	Tom Hammonds	Georgia Institute of Technology
1989	2	39	Ed Horton	University of Iowa
1989	2	41	Doug Roth	University of Tennessee
1988	1	12	Harvey Grant	University of Oklahoma
1988	2	36	Ledell Eackles	University of New Orleans
1988	3	60	Ed Davender	University of Kentucky
1987	1	12	Muggsy Bogues	Wake Forest University
1987	2	36	Duane Washington	Middle Tennessee State University
1987	2	37	Derrick Dowell	University of Southern California
1987	3	59	Danny Pearson	Jacksonville University
1987	4	81	Scott Thompson	University of San Diego
1987	5	106	Patrick Fairs	University of Texas at Austin
1987	6	128	Dwayne Scholten	Washington State University
1987	7	150	Jamie Dixon	Texas Christian University
1986	1	12	John Williams	Louisiana State University
1986	1	21	Anthony Jones	University of Nevada, Las Vegas
1986	2	36	Steve Mitchell	University of Alabama at Birmingham
1986	3	58	Dave Henderson	Duke University
1986	4	82	Barry Mungar	St. Bonaventure University
1986	5	104	Paul Fortier	University of Washington
1986	6	128	Lorenzo Duncan	Sam Houston State University
1986	7	150	Joe Price	University of Notre Dame
1985	1	12	Kenny Green	Wake Forest University
1985	2	31	Manute Bol	University of Bridgeport
1985	3	58	Vernon Moore	Creighton University
1985	3	65	Ken Perry	Southern Illinois University
1985	4	81	Richie Adams	University of Nevada, Las Vegas
1985	5	104	Dean Shaffer	Florida State University
1985	6	127	Matt England	Houston Baptist University
1985	7	150	Keith Gray	University of Detroit Mercy
1984	1	6	Melvin Turpin	University of Kentucky
1984	2	34	Tony Costner	Saint Joseph's University
1984	2	44	Fred Reynolds	University of Texas at El Paso
1984	3	53	Ricky Ross	University of Tulsa
1984	4	76	Jim Grandholm	University of South Florida
1984	5	99	Cohn Irish	Bowling Green State University
1984	6	122	Blaise Bugajeski	Illinois Wesleyan University
1984	7	145	Tim Garrett	University of New Mexico
1984	8	168	Darryl Odom	West Virginia Wesleyan College
1984	9	190	Mike Emanuel	University of North Carolina at Pembroke
1984	10	212	Glynn Myrick	Stetson University
1983	1	10	Jeff Malone	Mississippi State University
1983	1	22	Randy Wittman	Indiana University
1983	2	32	Michael Britt	University of the District of Columbia
1983	2	34	Guy Williams	Washington State University
1983	3	57	Darren Daye	University of California, Los Angeles
1983	4	80	Dan Gay	University of Louisiana at Lafayette
1983	5	103	Robin Dixon	University of New Hampshire
1983	6	126	Donald Carroll	Saint Augustine's College (Raleigh)
1983	7	149	Danny Womack	Winston-Salem State University
1983	8	172	Bernard Perry	Howard University
1983	9	194	Ricky Moreland	University of Maryland, Baltimore County
1983	10	215	Isiah Singletary	Saint Louis University
1982	2	25	Bryan Warrick	Saint Joseph's University
1982	2	41	Dwight Anderson	University of Southern California
1982	2	44	Mike Gibson	University of South Carolina Upstate
1982	3	58	Mike Largey	Upsala College
1982	4	81	Dino Gregory	California State University, Long Beach
1982	5	104	Clarence Dickerson	University of Hawaii
1982	5	112	Jerry Davis	University of Detroit Mercy
1982	6	127	Byron Williams	Idaho State University
1982	7	150	Wendell Gibson	University of South Carolina
1982	8	173	Ken Luck	University of Delaware
1982	9	196	James Terry	Howard University
1982	10	217	Donald Sinclair	North Carolina Central University
1981	1	11	Frank Johnson	Wake Forest University
1981	2	35	Charles Davis	Vanderbilt University
1981	2	41	Claude Gregory	University of Wisconsin–Madison
1981	2	44	Steve Lingenfelter	South Dakota State University
1981	3	48	Mike Ferrara	Colgate University
1981	4	79	Ron Davis	University of Arizona
1981	5	103	Garry Witts	College of the Holy Cross
1981	6	125	Robert Williams	Grambling State University
1981	7	149	Randy Martel	Houston Baptist University
1981	8	170	Mike Howard	Wofford College
1981	9	193	Eddie Brown	Valdosta State University
1981	10	212	Ralton Way	Houston Baptist University
1980	1	14	Wes Matthews	University of Wisconsin–Madison
1980	2	35	Rick Mahorn	Hampton University
1980	4	81	Francois Wise	California State University, Long Beach
1980	5	105	Daryl Strickland	Rutgers University
1980	6	127	Ken Dancy	Chicago State University
1980	7	151	Karl Godine	Stephen F. Austin State University
1980	8	170	Rich Valavicious	Auburn University
1980	9	191	Clinton Wyatt	Alcorn State University
1980	10	207	Don Youman	Oklahoma State University–Stillwater
1979	2	44	Joe DeSantis	Fairfield University
1979	3	46	Andrew Parker	Iowa State University
1979	3	66	Charles Floyd	High Point University
1979	4	88	Lamont Reid	Oral Roberts University
1979	5	108	Marshall Ashford	Virginia Polytechnic Institute and State University
1979	6	128	Garcia Hopkins	Morgan State University
1979	8	166	Jo Jo Walters	Manhattan College
1979	9	184	Gary Hooker	Murray State University
1979	10	202	Steve Martin	Georgetown University
1978	1	14	Roger Phegley	Bradley University
1978	1	18	Dave Corzine	DePaul University
1978	2	37	Terry Sykes	Grambling State University
1978	3	58	Rick Apke	Creighton University
1978	4	81	Lawrence Boston	University of Maryland
1978	5	102	Roger Dickens	Towson University
1978	6	125	Archie Aldridge	Miami University
1978	7	145	Ed Hopkins	Georgetown University
1978	8	165	Nestor Cora	St. Francis College
1978	9	181	Tim Claxton	Temple University
1978	10	197	Steve Connor	Boise State University
1977	1	4	Greg Ballard	University of Oregon
1977	1	17	Bo Ellis	Marquette University
1977	2	39	Phil Walker	Millersville University of Pennsylvania
1977	3	57	Steve Puidokas	Washington State University
1977	3	61	Jerry Schellenberg	Wake Forest University
1977	4	83	David Reavis	University of Georgia
1977	5	105	Bruce Parkinson	Purdue University
1977	6	127	Ernie Wansley	Virginia Polytechnic Institute and State University
1977	7	147	Calvin Brown	American University
1977	8	166	Pat McKinley	Towson University
1976	1	13	Mitch Kupchak	University of North Carolina
1976	1	14	Larry Wright	Grambling State University
1976	2	31	Joe Pace	Coppin State University
1976	3	49	Bill Cook	University of Memphis
1976	4	65	Marion Hillard	University of Memphis
1976	5	83	L.C. Mason	Alabama State University
1976	6	101	Pat Tallent	George Washington University
1976	7	119	Ralph Vallott	Loyola University Chicago
1976	8	137	Merlin Wilson	Georgetown University
1976	9	154	Clyde Agnew	Newberry College
1976	10	170	Mike Beuscher	Seton Hall University
1975	1	18	Kevin Grevey	University of Kentucky
1975	3	48	Tom Kropp	University of Nebraska at Kearney
1975	4	71	Fessor Leonard	Furman University
1975	5	90	Rich Jones	Virginia Commonwealth University
1975	6	107	John Garrett	Purdue University
1975	7	126	Fletcher Johnson	Randolph–Macon College
1975	8	143	Bruce Hamming	Augustana College
1975	9	160	Doug Brookins	Creighton University
1975	10	173	Mike Fahey	Brandeis University
1974	1	13	Len Elmore	University of Maryland
1974	2	22	Truck Robinson	Tennessee State University
1974	2	30	Dennis DuVal	Syracuse University
1974	4	66	Stan Washington	University of San Diego
1974	5	85	Gary Anderson	University of Washington
1974	6	102	Roy McPipe	Montana State University Billings
1974	7	121	Tom Turner	State University of West Georgia
1974	8	138	Steve Platt	Huntington University
1974	9	156	Mark Raterink	Boston College
1974	10	173	Pete Collins	High Point University

== As Capital Bullets (1973) ==
Year	Round	Pick	Name	From
1973	1	13	Nick Weatherspoon	University of Illinois at Urbana–Champaign
1973	2	19	Louie Nelson	University of Washington
1973	3	48	Tom Kozelko	University of Toledo
1973	4	65	Aron Stewart	University of Richmond
1973	5	82	Danny Traylor	University of South Carolina
1973	6	99	Mike Allocco	Stonehill College
1973	7	116	Rod Hogue	University of Georgia
1973	8	133	Mark Jellison	Northeastern University
1973	9	148	Mike Boylan	Assumption College
1973	10	162	Dick Kelly	Bay College (Michigan)
1973	11	172	Dale Adams	St. Mary's College of Maryland
1973	12	181	Mike Battle	George Washington University
1973	13	187	Chester Davis	Morgan State University
1973	14	192	Howard White	University of Maryland
1973	15	197	W. Shorty Simmons	St. Mary's College of Maryland

== As Baltimore Bullets (1963–1972) ==
Year	Round	Pick	Name	From
1972	2	25	Tom Patterson	Ouachita Baptist University
1972	3	39	Kevin Porter	Saint Francis University
1972	4	56	Al Sanders	Louisiana State University
1972	5	72	Walter Jones	Long Island University
1972	6	89	Dwaine Dillard	Eastern Michigan University
1972	7	106	Marvin Brown	Jackson State University
1972	8	122	Jim Floyd	Shaw University
1972	9	137	Ruppert Breedlove	Oglethorpe University
1972	10	150	Will Loftin	University of Louisiana at Lafayette
1972	11	161	Marvin Watkins	Jackson State University
1972	12	170	Lloyd Adams	University of Rhode Island
1972	13	178	Mike Krawzyk	Loyola College in Maryland
1972	14	184	Aubrey Nash	University of Kansas
1972	15	191	Gary Handleman	Johns Hopkins University
1971	1	9	Stan Love	University of Oregon
1971	3	43	Rich Rinaldi	Saint Peter's College (New Jersey)
1971	4	60	Willie Allen	University of Miami
1971	5	77	Don Johnson	University of Tennessee
1971	6	94	John Novey	Mount St. Mary's University
1971	7	111	Dennis Hogg	Washington State University
1971	8	128	Russell Golden	Jackson State University
1971	9	144	Ron Johnston	Murray State University
1971	10	160	Eddie Myers	University of Arizona
1971	11	175	Chuck Olowski	University of Baltimore
1971	12	188	Bob Connor	Loyola College in Maryland
1971	13	200	Ron Crosswhite	University of Dayton
1971	14	211	Rudolph Peele	Norfolk State University
1971	15	220	James Morrell	Norfolk State University
1970	1	9	George Johnson	Stephen F. Austin State University
1970	3	49	Seaburn Hill	Arizona State University
1970	4	54	Bill Stricker	University of the Pacific
1970	4	66	Billy Jones	Louisiana College
1970	5	83	Gary Zeller	Drake University
1970	6	100	Marvin Polnick	Stephen F. Austin State University
1970	7	117	Charlie Wallace	Oklahoma City University
1970	8	134	Tom Dyksera	Wheaton College
1970	9	151	Will Hetzel	University of Maryland
1970	10	168	Ron Becker	University of New Mexico
1970	11	183	Mel Bell	University of Houston
1970	12	193	Ben McGilmer	University of Iowa
1970	13	203	Dan Debardabi	Northern Arizona University
1970	14	213	Mike Williams	Northern Arizona University
1970	15	222	Ted Rose	Northern Michigan University
1970	16	229	Don Rather	Northern Arizona University
1970	17	233	Vince Fritz	Oregon State University
1969	1	14	Mike Davis	Virginia Union University
1969	2	29	Willie Scott	Alabama State University
1969	3	43	Fred Carter	Mount St. Mary's University
1969	4	57	Gene Ford	Western Michigan University
1969	5	71	Willie Jackson	Morehead State University
1969	6	85	Paul Loveday	University of California
1969	7	99	Jeff Claypool	Grove City College
1969	8	113	Barry White	Hofstra University
1969	9	127	Gary Major	Duquesne University
1969	10	141	Frank Bartleson	Tennessee Technological University
1969	11	155	Jerry McKee	Ohio University
1969	12	168	Bob Washington	University of Tulsa
1969	13	179	Bill Thompson	Shepherd College
1969	14	188	Perry Johnson	Robert Morris University
1969	15	194	Jodie Harrison	University of Illinois at Urbana–Champaign
1969	16	200	Phil Harris	Texas A&M University
1969	17	206	Tom Haggart	Brandeis University
1969	18	211	Chip Case	University of Virginia
1969	19	215	Brian Heaney	Acadia University
1969	20	218	Stan McKain	Southern University and A&M College
1968	1	2	Wes Unseld	University of Louisville
1968	2	18	Bob Quick	Xavier University
1968	3	26	Ron Nelson	University of New Mexico
1968	3	33	Jack Thompson	University of South Carolina
1968	4	40	Dallas Thornton	Kentucky Wesleyan College
1968	5	54	Ed Chaplin	Voorhees College
1968	6	68	Joe Heiser	Princeton University
1968	7	82	Jasper Wilson	Southern University and A&M College
1968	8	96	Barry Orms	Saint Louis University
1968	9	110	Wayne Chapman	Western Kentucky University
1968	10	124	Steve Adelman	Boston College
1968	11	138	Al Dixon	Bowling Green State University
1968	12	151	Willie Cager	University of Texas at El Paso
1968	13	164	Rudy Bogad	St. John's University
1968	14	175	Ernest Sims	East Tennessee State University
1968	15	184	Joe Allen	Bradley University
1968	16	192	Dennis Blace	University of San Francisco
1968	17	200	Greg Morris	Cornell University
1968	18	206	Art Kenny	Fairfield University
1968	19	210	Jim LaCour	Seattle University
1968	20	213	Ron Woodruff	Midwestern State University
1967	1	2	Earl Monroe	Winston-Salem State University
1967	2	13	Jimmy Jones	Grambling State University
1967	3	20	Malikin Strong	Seattle University
1967	4	32	Al Salvadori	University of South Carolina
1967	5	44	Dexter Westbrook	Providence College
1967	6	56	Bob Riedy	Duke University
1967	7	68	Ron Perry	Virginia Polytechnic Institute and State University
1967	8	80	Ed Manning	Jackson State University
1967	9	92	Robert Allen	University of Arkansas at Pine Bluff
1967	10	103	Bill Gillespie	Montana State University
1967	11	114	Bubba Smith	Michigan State University
1967	12	124	Tony Eaton	University of Texas–Pan American
1967	13	134	Lyn Burkholder	University of South Carolina
1967	14	142	Paul Mickey	Pennsylvania State University
1967	15	148	Rich Peek	Louisiana Tech University
1967	16	153	Gary Williams	University of Oklahoma
1967	17	157	Loy Petersen	Oregon State University
1967	18	160	Jerry Southwood	Vanderbilt University
1967	19	161	George Spencer	University of Washington
1967	20	162	Roland West	University of Cincinnati
1966	1	5	Jack Marin	Duke University
1966	2	15	Neil Johnson	Creighton University
1966	3	25	Dave Wagnon	Idaho State University
1966	4	35	George Peeples	University of Iowa
1966	5	45	John Beasley	Texas A&M University
1966	5	46	John Jones	Louisiana State University
1966	6	55	Jeff Newman	University of Pennsylvania
1966	7	64	Dave Mills	DePaul University
1966	8	73	Roland West	University of Cincinnati
1966	9	80	Chuck Gardner	University of Colorado
1966	10	87	Guy Manning	Prairie View A&M University
1966	11	94	Stan McKenzie	New York University
1966	12	100	Grant Simmons	University of Nebraska–Lincoln
1966	13	103	Al Lopes	University of Kansas
1966	14	105	Jim Harter	University of Texas–Pan American
1966	15	107	Howard Bayne	University of Tennessee
1966	16	109	Ken Barnes	University of Wisconsin–Madison
1966	17	110	Chris Pervall	University of Iowa
1966	18	111	Jerry Trice	Weber State University
1966	19	112	Gene Visscher	Weber State University
1965	1	4	Jerry Sloan	University of Evansville
1965	2	12	Tal Brody	University of Illinois at Urbana–Champaign
1965	3	21	Joe Newton	Auburn University
1965	4	30	Skip Thoren	University of Illinois at Urbana–Champaign
1965	5	39	Charles Dinkens	Miami University
1965	6	48	Lavonne LeFlore	Jackson State University
1965	7	56	Willie Somerset	Duquesne University
1965	8	64	Jim Murphy	DePaul University
1965	9	70	John Wendelkin	College of the Holy Cross
1965	10	76	Bogie Redmon	University of Illinois at Urbana–Champaign
1965	11	82	Thales McReynolds	Miles College
1965	12	88	Walt Sahm	University of Notre Dame
1965	13	93	Joe Ramsey	Southern Illinois University
1965	14	97	Jerry Rook	Arkansas State University
1965	15	101	Dave Hicks	
1965	16	105	Bunk Adams	Ohio University
1965	17	109	Roger Taylor	University of Illinois at Urbana–Champaign
1964	1	3	Gary Bradds	Ohio State University
1964	3	19	Jerry Sloan	University of Evansville
1964	4	28	Pete Spoden	University of Northern Iowa
1964	5	37	Bennie Lenox	Texas A&M University
1964	6	46	Bobby Joe Edmonds	Tennessee State University
1964	7	55	Ron Miller	Loyola University Chicago
1964	8	64	Danny Schultz	University of Tennessee
1964	9	72	Tom Black	South Dakota State University
1964	10	79	Bill Kusleika	University of Tulsa
1964	11	86	Fred Glover	Winston-Salem State University
1964	12	90	Frank Kamiaski	Randolph–Macon College
1964	13	94	Doug Moon	University of Utah
1964	14	96	Pete Gent	Michigan State University
1964	15	98	Sandy Williams	Saint Francis University
1963	1	2	Rod Thorn	West Virginia University
1963	2	10	Gus Johnson	University of Idaho
1963	3	19	Tom Bolyard	Indiana University
1963	4	28	Nolen Ellison	University of Kansas
1963	5	37	Ron Glaser	Marquette University
1963	6	46	Ken Siebel	University of Wisconsin–Madison
1963	7	55	Larry Brown	University of North Carolina
1963	8	64	Dick Riesback	Iowa State University
1963	9	69	Ron Jackson	University of Wisconsin–Madison
1963	10	74	M. C. Thompson	DePaul University

== As Chicago Zephyrs (1962) ==
Year	Round	Pick	Name	From
1962	1	1	Bill McGill	University of Utah
1962	2	8	Terry Dischinger	Purdue University
1962	3	17	Don Nelson	University of Iowa
1962	5	35	Cornell Green	Utah State University
1962	6	44	Bill Hanson	University of Washington
1962	7	53	Jack Ardon	Tulane University
1962	8	61	Larry Pursiful	University of Kentucky
1962	9	70	Carroll Broussard	Texas A&M University
1962	10	79	Pete Campbell	Princeton University
1962	11	85	Jeff Slade	Kenyon College
1962	12	90	Mel Nowell	Ohio State University
1962	13	93	Tom Kennedy	Lewis University
1962	14	95	Bob Mahland	Williams College
1962	15	97	Pat McKenzie	Kansas State University
1962	16	99	Norman Majors	Rockhurst University

== As Chicago Packers (1961) ==
Year	Round	Pick	Name	From
1961	1	1	Walt Bellamy	Indiana University
1961	2	18	Jack Turner	University of Louisville
1961	2	19	Jerry Graves	Mississippi State University
1961	2	20	York Larese	University of North Carolina
1961	2	21	Don Kojis	Marquette University
1961	2	22	Douglas Moe	University of North Carolina
1961	2	23	Jeff Cohen	College of William & Mary
1961	3	32	Bill Bridges	University of Kansas
1961	4	41	Roger Kaiser	Georgia Institute of Technology
1961	5	50	Howie Carl	DePaul University
1961	6	59	Dave Voss	University of Tulsa
1961	7	68	Ron Heller	Wichita State University
1961	8	76	John Wessels	University of Illinois at Urbana–Champaign
1961	9	83	Steve Strange	Southern Methodist University
1961	10	91	Larry Comley	Kansas State University
