= Washington Wizards all-time roster =

The following is a list of players of the 1997–present Washington Wizards professional American basketball team. Before the 1997–98 season the Wizards were known as the Chicago Packers (1961–1962), Chicago Zephyrs (1962–1963), Baltimore Bullets (1963–1973), Capital Bullets (1973–1974), and the Washington Bullets (1974–1997).

== Players ==
Note: Statistics are correct through the end of the 2025–26 season.

G	Guard	G/F	Guard-forward	F	Forward	F/C	Forward-center	C	Center

legend
^	Denotes player who has been inducted to the Naismith Memorial Basketball Hall of Fame
*	Denotes player who has been selected for at least one All-Star Game with the Washington Wizards and is currently on the team roster
^{+}	Denotes player who has been selected for at least one All-Star Game with the Washington Wizards
^{x}	Denotes player who is currently on the Washington Wizards roster
0.0	Denotes the Washington Wizards statistics leader (min. 100 games played for the team for per-game statistics)

=== A to B ===
All-time roster
Player	Pos.	Pre-draft team	Yrs	Seasons	Statistics									Ref.
Player	Pos.	Pre-draft team	Yrs	Seasons	GP	MP	REB	AST	PTS	MPG	RPG	APG	PPG	Ref.
Mark Acres	F/C	Oral Roberts	1	1992–1993	12	246	61	5	58	20.5	5.1	0.4	4.8	
Michael Adams^{+}	G	Boston College	4	1986–1987; 1991–1994	281	8,934	856	1,844	3,745	31.8	3.0	6.6	13.3	
Mark Alarie	F	Duke	4	1987–1991	261	4,390	906	289	1,929	16.8	3.5	1.1	7.4	
Courtney Alexander	G	Fresno State	2	2000–2002	83	2,235	228	127	1,007	26.9	2.7	1.5	12.1	
Morris Almond	G	Rice	1	2011–2012	4	67	8	2	14	16.8	2.0	0.5	3.5	
Ashraf Amaya	F	Southern Illinois	1	1996–1997	31	144	52	3	40	4.6	1.7	0.1	1.3	
Alan Anderson	G/F	Michigan State	1	2015–2016	13	192	27	14	65	14.8	2.1	1.1	5.0	
Ron Anderson	G/F	Fresno State	1	1993–1994	10	180	27	11	52	18.0	2.7	1.1	5.2	
Gilbert Arenas^{+}	G	Arizona	8	2003–2011	357	14,049	1,513	2,046	8,930	39.4	4.2	5.7	25.0	
Trevor Ariza	F	UCLA	3	2012–2014; 2018–2019	176	5,659	967	469	2,242	32.2	5.5	2.7	12.7	
Hilton Armstrong	F/C	UConn	1	2010–2011	41	412	114	10	77	10.0	2.8	0.2	1.9	
Chucky Atkins	G	South Florida	1	2005–2006	28	552	45	69	187	19.7	1.6	2.5	6.7	
Isaac Austin	C	Arizona State	1	1999–2000	59	1,173	282	74	397	19.9	4.8	1.3	6.7	
John Austin	G	Boston College	1	1966–1967	4	61	7	4	23	15.3	1.8	1.0	5.8	
Deni Avdija	F	(Israel) Maccabi Tel Aviv	4	2020–2024	287	7,518	1,714	727	2,826	26.2	6.0	2.5	9.8	
Joël Ayayi	G	Gonzaga	1	2021–2022	7	20	3	4	2	2.9	0.4	0.6	0.3	
Marvin Bagley III	F/C	Duke	3	2023–2026	81	1,472	466	91	796	18.2	5.8	1.1	9.8	
Gus Bailey	G/F	UTEP	1	1979–1980	20	180	28	26	38	9.0	1.4	1.3	1.9	
Ron Baker	G	Wichita State	1	2018–2019	4	45	4	2	0	11.3	1.0	0.5	0.0	
Patrick Baldwin Jr.	F	Milwaukee	2	2023–2025	60	594	145	31	215	9.9	2.4	0.5	3.6	
Greg Ballard	F	Oregon	8	1977–1985	643	18,687	4,094	1,542	8,706	29.1	6.4	2.4	13.5	
Jim Barnes	F/C	UTEP	2	1964–1965; 1970–1971	77	2,028	699	93	835	26.3	9.1	1.2	10.8	
John Barnhill	G	Tennessee State	2	1966–1967; 1968–1969	83	1,718	210	207	631	20.7	2.5	2.5	7.6	
Earl Barron	C	Memphis	1	2012–2013	11	122	43	3	28	11.1	3.9	0.3	2.5	
Will Barton	G/F	Memphis	1	2022–2023	40	782	111	95	307	19.6	2.8	2.4	7.7	
Billy Ray Bates	G	Kentucky State	1	1982–1983	15	277	18	14	118	18.5	1.2	0.9	7.9	
Dave Batton	C	Notre Dame	1	1982–1983	54	558	119	29	178	10.3	2.2	0.5	3.3	
Lonny Baxter	F	Maryland	1	2003–2004	12	132	31	5	41	11.0	2.6	0.4	3.4	
Bradley Beal^{+}	G	Florida	11	2012–2023	695	24,091	2,837	2,972	15,391	34.7	4.1	4.3	22.1	
Ron Behagen	F/C	Minnesota	1	1979–1980	6	64	14	7	23	10.7	2.3	1.2	3.8	
Jordan Bell	F/C	Oregon	1	2020–2021	5	67	19	5	14	13.4	3.8	1.0	2.8	
Walt Bellamy^	C	Indiana	5	1961–1966	327	13,613	5,438	778	9,020	41.6	16.6	2.4	27.6	
Jules Bernard	G	UCLA	1	2023–2024	19	149	26	16	74	7.8	1.4	0.8	3.9	
Dāvis Bertāns	F	(Slovenia) Olimpija Ljubljana	3	2019–2022	145	3,548	474	157	1,683	24.5	3.3	1.1	11.6	
Mike Bibby	G	Arizona	1	2010–2011	2	29	3	8	2	14.5	1.5	4.0	1.0	
Dave Bing^	G	Syracuse	2	1975–1977	146	4,461	380	767	2,004	30.6	2.6	5.3	13.7	
Leaky Black^{x}	F	North Carolina	1	2025–2026	15	433	75	22	106	28.9	5.0	1.5	7.1	
DeJuan Blair	F/C	Pittsburgh	2	2014–2016	58	398	113	14	117	6.9	1.9	0.2	2.0	
Steve Blake	G	Maryland	2	2003–2005	119	2,040	188	278	635	17.1	1.6	2.3	5.3	
Andray Blatche	F	South Kent School (CT)	7	2005–2012	409	9,289	2,217	601	4,042	22.7	5.4	1.5	9.9	
Bojan Bogdanović	G/F	(Croatia) Cibona	1	2016–2017	26	601	80	21	330	23.1	3.1	0.8	12.7	
Muggsy Bogues	G	Wake Forest	1	1987–1988	79	1,628	136	404	393	20.6	1.7	5.1	5.0	
Etdrick Bohannon	F	Auburn Montgomery	1	1998–1999	2	4	0	0	0	2.0	0.0	0.0	0.0	
Manute Bol	C	Bridgeport	4	1985–1988; 1993–1994	241	4,784	1,115	48	725	19.9	4.6	0.2	3.0	
George Bon Salle	F	Illinois	1	1961–1962	3	9	2	0	4	3.0	0.7	0.0	1.3	
Isaac Bonga	F	(Germany) Skyliners Frankfurt	2	2019–2021	106	1,682	288	99	408	15.9	2.7	0.9	3.8	
Trevor Booker	F	Clemson	4	2010–2014	235	4,764	1,194	179	1,512	20.3	5.1	0.8	6.4	
Calvin Booth	C	Penn State	4	1999–2001; 2005–2007	128	1,413	339	60	338	11.0	2.6	0.5	2.6	
Lawrence Boston	F	Maryland	1	1979–1980	13	125	39	2	56	9.6	3.0	0.2	4.3	
Jamaree Bouyea	G	San Francisco	1	2022–2023	1	6	1	0	0	6.0	1.0	0.0	0.0	
Earl Boykins	G	Eastern Michigan	1	2009–2010	67	1,117	75	171	440	16.7	1.1	2.6	6.6	
Gary Bradds	F	Ohio State	2	1964–1966	44	350	92	20	144	8.0	2.1	0.5	3.3	
Dudley Bradley	G/F	North Carolina	2	1984–1986	143	2,074	229	280	553	14.5	1.6	2.0	3.9	
Torraye Braggs	F	Xavier	1	2003–2004	4	22	5	1	6	5.5	1.3	0.3	1.5	
Malaki Branham	G	Ohio State	1	2025–2026	28	275	44	23	128	9.8	1.6	0.8	4.6	
David Britton	G	Texas A&M	1	1980–1981	2	9	2	3	4	4.5	1.0	1.5	2.0	
Malcolm Brogdon	G	Virginia	1	2024–2025	24	564	91	98	305	23.5	3.8	4.1	12.7	
Damone Brown	F	Syracuse	1	2004–2005	14	152	28	14	54	10.9	2.0	1.0	3.9	
Dee Brown	G	Illinois	1	2008–2009	17	233	28	33	41	13.7	1.6	1.9	2.4	
Kwame Brown	F	Glynn Academy (GA)	4	2001–2005	253	5,737	1,380	252	1,948	22.7	5.5	1.0	7.7	
Lewis Brown	C	UNLV	1	1980–1981	2	5	2	0	2	2.5	1.0	0.0	1.0	
Troy Brown Jr.	G/F	Oregon	3	2018–2021	142	2,799	589	277	1,054	19.7	4.1	2.0	7.4	
Thomas Bryant	C	Indiana	4	2018–2022	155	3,353	954	213	1,711	21.6	6.2	1.4	11.0	
Trey Burke	G	Michigan	1	2016–2017	57	703	47	100	285	12.3	0.8	1.8	5.0	
Steve Burtt Sr.	G	Iona	1	1992–1993	4	35	3	6	29	8.8	0.8	1.5	7.3	
Al Butler	G	Niagara	1	1964–1965	25	172	21	12	59	6.9	0.8	0.5	2.4	
Caron Butler^{+}	F	UConn	5	2005–2010	310	11,934	2,051	1,100	5,889	38.5	6.6	3.5	19.0	
Jared Butler	G	Baylor	2	2023–2025	72	929	99	208	471	12.9	1.4	2.9	6.5	
Mitchell Butler	G/F	UCLA	4	1993–1996; 2003–2004	253	4,285	584	267	1,486	16.9	2.3	1.1	5.9	
Rasual Butler	G/F	La Salle	1	2014–2015	75	1,505	197	63	580	20.1	2.6	0.8	7.7	
Will Bynum	G	Georgia Tech	1	2014–2015	7	67	6	18	22	9.6	0.9	2.6	3.1	

=== C ===
All-time roster
Player	Pos.	Pre-draft team	Yrs	Seasons	Statistics									Ref.
Player	Pos.	Pre-draft team	Yrs	Seasons	GP	MP	REB	AST	PTS	MPG	RPG	APG	PPG	Ref.
Barney Cable	F	Bradley	3	1961–1964	105	2,164	493	119	619	20.6	4.7	1.1	5.9	
Kentavious Caldwell-Pope	G	Georgia	1	2021–2022	77	2,329	261	145	1,018	30.2	3.4	1.9	13.2	
Brian Cardinal	F	Purdue	1	2002–2003	5	15	5	1	4	3.0	1.0	0.2	0.8	
Vernon Carey Jr.	F/C	Duke	2	2021–2023	14	55	18	3	18	3.9	1.3	0.2	1.3	
Howie Carl	G	DePaul	1	1961–1962	31	382	39	57	170	12.3	1.3	1.8	5.5	
Austin Carr	G	Notre Dame	1	1980–1981	39	580	52	49	192	14.9	1.3	1.3	4.9	
Bub Carrington^{x}	G	Pittsburgh	2	2024–2026	164	4,729	617	745	1,685	28.8	3.8	4.5	10.3	
Fred Carter	G/F	Mount St. Mary's	3	1969–1972	155	2,994	462	298	1,208	19.3	3.0	1.9	7.8	
Terry Catledge	F	South Alabama	3	1986–1989	227	5,836	1,529	194	2,593	25.7	6.7	0.9	11.4	
Justin Champagnie^{x}	F	Pittsburgh	3	2023–2026	146	2,952	788	163	1,230	20.2	5.4	1.1	8.4	
Rex Chapman	G	Kentucky	4	1991–1995	166	4,815	351	432	2,584	29.0	2.1	2.6	15.6	
Calbert Cheaney	G/F	Indiana	6	1993–1999	424	13,097	1,483	817	5,399	30.9	3.5	1.9	12.7	
Phil Chenier^{+} (#45)	G	California	9	1971–1980	546	18,654	2,020	1,688	9,778	34.2	3.7	3.1	17.9	
Chris Chiozza	G	Florida	1	2019–2020	10	123	15	28	27	12.3	1.5	2.8	2.7	
Jim Chones	F/C	Marquette	1	1981–1982	59	867	185	64	184	14.7	3.1	1.1	3.1	
Archie Clark^{+}	G	Minnesota	3	1971–1974	171	6,506	535	1,166	3,357	38.0	3.1	6.8	19.6	
Jim Cleamons	G	Ohio State	1	1979–1980	57	1,535	133	248	444	26.9	2.3	4.4	7.8	
John Coker	C	Boise State	1	1998–1999	14	98	22	0	31	7.0	1.6	0.0	2.2	
Don Collins	G/F	Washington State	4	1980–1983; 1984–1985	189	3,936	506	362	1,921	20.8	2.7	1.9	10.2	
Jason Collins	C	Stanford	1	2012–2013	6	54	8	2	4	9.0	1.3	0.3	0.7	
Steve Colter	G	New Mexico State	3	1987–1990	209	3,763	513	608	1,342	18.0	2.5	2.9	6.4	
Larry Comley	G	Kansas State	1	1963–1964	12	89	19	12	25	7.4	1.6	1.0	2.1	
Marty Conlon	F/C	Providence	1	1993–1994	14	201	50	6	70	14.4	3.6	0.4	5.0	
Brian Cook	F	Illinois	1	2011–2012	16	155	40	8	50	9.7	2.5	0.5	3.1	
Darwin Cook	G	Portland	1	1986–1987	82	1,420	145	151	614	17.3	1.8	1.8	7.5	
Xavier Cooks	F	Winthrop	1	2022–2023	10	126	38	6	38	12.6	3.8	0.6	3.8	
Joe Cooper	F/C	Colorado	1	1982–1983	5	47	13	2	15	9.4	2.6	0.4	3.0	
Sharife Cooper^{x}	G	Auburn	1	2025–2026	41	700	86	124	333	17.1	2.1	3.0	8.1	
Chris Corchiani	G	NC State	1	1992–1993	1	3	0	0	2	3.0	0.0	0.0	2.0	
Dave Corzine	C	DePaul	2	1978–1980	137	1,358	417	112	400	9.9	3.0	0.8	2.9	
Bilal Coulibaly^{x}	G/F	(France) Metropolitans 92	3	2023–2026	178	5,131	793	454	1,916	28.8	4.5	2.6	10.8	
Mel Counts	F/C	Oregon State	1	1966–1967	25	343	155	30	159	13.7	6.2	1.2	6.4	
Chubby Cox	G	San Francisco	1	1982–1983	7	78	10	6	29	11.1	1.4	0.9	4.1	
Johnny Cox	G	Kentucky	1	1962–1963	73	1,685	280	142	573	23.1	3.8	1.9	7.8	
Jordan Crawford	G	Xavier	3	2010–2013	133	3,747	380	449	1,929	28.2	2.9	3.4	14.5	
Javaris Crittenton	G	Georgia Tech	1	2008–2009	56	1,130	160	145	298	20.2	2.9	2.6	5.3	
Michael Curry	G/F	Georgia Southern	1	1995–1996	5	34	5	1	10	6.8	1.0	0.2	2.0	

=== D to E ===
|-

All-time roster
Player	Pos.	Pre-draft team	Yrs	Seasons	Statistics									Ref.
Player	Pos.	Pre-draft team	Yrs	Seasons	GP	MP	REB	AST	PTS	MPG	RPG	APG	PPG	Ref.
Bob Dandridge^	G/F	Norfolk State	4	1977–1981	221	7,408	1,218	890	4,052	33.5	5.5	4.0	18.3	
Antonio Daniels	G	Bowling Green	4	2005–2009	244	6,493	548	961	2,001	26.6	2.2	3.9	8.2	
Charles Davis	F	Vanderbilt	4	1981–1985	178	2,231	453	135	1,004	12.5	2.5	0.8	5.6	
Hubert Davis	G	North Carolina	2	2000–2002	66	1,662	107	156	518	25.2	1.6	2.4	7.8	
Johnny Davis	G	Wisconsin	3	2022–2025	112	1,278	175	71	395	11.4	1.6	0.6	3.5	
Mike Davis	G	Virginia Union	2	1969–1970; 1972–1973	69	1,613	163	130	792	23.4	2.4	1.9	11.5	
Paul Davis	C	Michigan State	1	2009–2010	2	8	0	3	5	4.0	0.0	1.5	2.5	
Ralph Davis	G	Cincinnati	1	1961–1962	77	1,992	162	247	799	25.9	2.1	3.2	10.4	
Terry Davis	F/C	Virginia Union	2	1997–1999	111	2,283	619	40	449	20.6	5.6	0.4	4.0	
Darren Daye	G/F	UCLA	3	1983–1986	219	3,822	643	525	1,706	17.5	2.9	2.4	7.8	
Archie Dees	F/C	Indiana	1	1961–1962	13					0.0	0.0	0.0	0.0	
Sam Dekker	F	Wisconsin	1	2018–2019	38	619	115	37	230	16.3	3.0	1.0	6.1	
Hamidou Diallo	G	Kentucky	1	2023–2024	2	5	2	1	2	2.5	1.0	0.5	1.0	
Spencer Dinwiddie	G	Colorado	1	2021–2022	44	1,330	207	256	556	30.2	4.7	5.8	12.6	
Terry Dischinger^{+}	G/F	Purdue	2	1962–1964	137	5,110	1,125	332	3,114	37.3	8.2	2.4	22.7	
Juan Dixon	G	Maryland	4	2002–2005; 2008–2009	226	3,995	406	406	1,702	17.7	1.8	1.8	7.5	
Devon Dotson	G	Kansas	1	2022–2023	6	53	10	8	3	8.8	1.7	1.3	0.5	
Terry Driscoll	F	Boston College	2	1971–1973	41	318	112	23	107	7.8	2.7	0.6	2.6	
Kevin Duckworth	C	Eastern Illinois	2	1993–1995	109	2,303	520	76	739	21.1	4.8	0.7	6.8	
Jared Dudley	G/F	Boston College	1	2015–2016	81	2,098	286	170	638	25.9	3.5	2.1	7.9	
Dennis DuVal	G	Syracuse	1	1974–1975	37	137	23	14	60	3.7	0.6	0.4	1.6	
Ledell Eackles	G/F	New Orleans	6	1988–1992; 1995–1996; 1997–1998	387	8,019	884	668	4,388	20.7	2.3	1.7	11.3	
Jaime Echenique	C	Wichita State	1	2021–2022	1	3	0	0	0	3.0	0.0	0.0	0.0	
Jarell Eddie	G/F	Virginia Tech	1	2015–2016	26	147	23	5	63	5.7	0.9	0.2	2.4	
Johnny Egan	G	Providence	3	1965–1968	207	4,259	473	668	1,861	20.6	2.3	3.2	9.0	
Obinna Ekezie	F/C	Maryland	1	2000–2001	29	273	76	9	101	9.4	2.6	0.3	3.5	
LeRoy Ellis	F/C	St. John's	4	1966–1970	311	8,423	2,718	448	3,219	27.1	8.7	1.4	10.4	
Pervis Ellison	F/C	Louisville	4	1990–1994	238	7,332	2,000	479	3,309	30.8	8.4	2.0	13.9	
A. J. English	G	Virginia Union	2	1990–1992	151	3,108	315	320	1,502	20.6	2.1	2.1	9.9	
Maurice Evans	G	Texas	2	2010–2012	50	1,055	96	24	368	21.1	1.9	0.5	7.4	

=== F to G ===
All-time roster
Player	Pos.	Pre-draft team	Yrs	Seasons	Statistics									Ref.
Player	Pos.	Pre-draft team	Yrs	Seasons	GP	MP	REB	AST	PTS	MPG	RPG	APG	PPG	Ref.
Dave Feitl	C	UTEP	1	1988–1989	57	828	202	36	286	14.5	3.5	0.6	5.0	
Al Ferrari	G/F	Michigan State	1	1962–1963	18	138	12	14	38	7.7	0.7	0.8	2.1	
Bob Ferry	F/C	Saint Louis	5	1964–1969	260	4,377	1,142	328	1,565	16.8	4.4	1.3	6.0	
Matt Fish	C	UNC Wilmington	1	1996–1997	5	7	5	0	2	1.4	1.0	0.0	0.4	
Greg Foster	F/C	UTEP	3	1990–1993	113	1,247	323	83	473	11.0	2.9	0.7	4.2	
Randy Foye	G	Villanova	1	2009–2010	70	1,667	130	228	704	23.8	1.9	3.3	10.1	
Tim Frazier	G	Penn State	1	2017–2018	59	838	115	194	176	14.2	1.9	3.3	3.0	
Daniel Gafford	F/C	Arkansas	4	2020–2024	218	4,648	1,329	233	2,105	21.3	6.1	1.1	9.7	
Danilo Gallinari	F	(Italy) Olimpia Milano	1	2023–2024	26	385	76	31	181	14.8	2.9	1.2	7.0	
Andrew Gaze	G	Seton Hall	1	1993–1994	7	70	7	5	22	10.0	1.0	0.7	3.1	
Alonzo Gee	G	Alabama	2	2009–2011	22	309	55	12	113	14.0	2.5	0.5	5.1	
Kyshawn George^{x}	G/F	Miami (Florida)	2	2024–2026	116	3,193	530	383	1,300	27.5	4.6	3.3	11.2	
Dick Gibbs	G/F	UTEP	1	1974–1975	59	424	61	19	196	7.2	1.0	0.3	3.3	
Mike Gibson	F	USC Upstate	1	1983–1984	32	229	66	9	53	7.2	2.1	0.3	1.7	
Taj Gibson	F/C	USC	1	2022–2023	49	480	93	34	168	9.8	1.9	0.7	3.4	
Keshon Gilbert	G	Iowa State	1	2025–2026	3	48	5	3	6	16.0	1.7	1.0	2.0	
Anthony Gill^{x}	F	Virginia	6	2020–2026	285	3,119	553	191	1,094	10.9	1.9	0.7	3.8	
Anthony Goldwire	G	Houston	1	2002–2003	5	34	3	1	13	6.8	0.6	0.2	2.6	
Drew Gooden	F	Kansas	3	2013–2016	103	1,564	422	77	542	15.2	4.1	0.7	5.3	
Jordan Goodwin	G	Saint Louis	2	2021–2023	64	1,112	206	168	407	17.4	3.2	2.6	6.4	
Marcin Gortat	F/C	(Germany) RheinEnergie Cologne	5	2013–2018	402	11,995	3,697	613	4,654	29.8	9.2	1.5	11.6	
Joe Graboski	F	Roberto Clemente HS (IL)	1	1961–1962	12	117	40	6	67	9.8	3.3	0.5	5.6	
Greg Grant	G	TCNJ	1	1995–1996	10	138	6	23	24	13.8	0.6	2.3	2.4	
Harvey Grant	F	Oklahoma	7	1988–1993; 1996–1998	508	13,435	2,330	896	5,445	26.4	4.6	1.8	10.7	
Jerian Grant	G	Notre Dame	1	2019–2020	6	80	6	9	27	13.3	1.0	1.5	4.5	
Leonard Gray	F	Long Beach State	1	1976–1977	58	996	186	69	347	17.2	3.2	1.2	6.0	
Jeff Green	F	Georgetown	1	2018–2019	77	2,097	309	137	946	27.2	4.0	1.8	12.3	
Johnny Green	F/C	Michigan State	2	1965–1967	133	2,385	965	153	1,319	17.9	7.3	1.2	9.9	
Kenny Green	F	Wake Forest	1	1985–1986	20	221	38	3	109	11.1	1.9	0.2	5.5	
Sihugo Green	G/F	Duquesne	4	1961–1965	275	5,798	786	777	2,030	26.6	3.6	3.6	7.4	
Claude Gregory	F	Wisconsin	1	1985–1986	2	2	2	0	2	1.0	1.0	0.0	1.0	
Kevin Grevey	G/F	Kentucky	8	1975–1983	530	13,141	1,410	1,078	6,442	24.8	2.7	2.0	12.2	
Tom Gugliotta	F	NC State	3	1992–1995	165	5,816	1,562	600	2,616	35.2	9.5	3.6	15.9	

=== H ===
All-time roster
Player	Pos.	Pre-draft team	Yrs	Seasons	Statistics									Ref.
Player	Pos.	Pre-draft team	Yrs	Seasons	GP	MP	REB	AST	PTS	MPG	RPG	APG	PPG	Ref.
Rui Hachimura	F	Gonzaga	4	2019–2023	177	4,912	894	252	2,303	27.8	5.1	1.4	13.0	
Mike Hall	F	George Washington	1	2006–2007	2	13	2	1	2	6.5	1.0	0.5	1.0	
Darvin Ham	F	Texas Tech	1	1997–1998	71	635	131	16	145	8.9	1.8	0.2	2.0	
Richard Hamilton	G/F	UConn	3	1999–2002	212	6,095	583	503	3,310	28.8	2.8	2.4	15.6	
Tom Hammonds	F	Georgia Tech	3	1989–1992	168	2,812	559	130	1,128	16.7	3.3	0.8	6.7	
Charles Hardnett	F/C	Grambling State	3	1962–1965	164	2,474	930	103	1,198	15.1	5.7	0.6	7.3	
Jaden Hardy^{x}	G	NBA G League Ignite	1	2025–2026	23	470	39	29	290	20.4	1.7	1.3	12.6	
Montrezl Harrell	F/C	Louisville	1	2021–2022	46	1,117	309	96	647	24.3	6.7	2.1	14.1	
Al Harrington	F	St. Patrick HS (NJ)	1	2013–2014	34	511	80	28	225	15.0	2.4	0.8	6.6	
Mike Harris	F	Rice	1	2009–2010	5	14	4	0	4	2.8	0.8	0.0	0.8	
Clem Haskins	G	Western Kentucky	2	1974–1976	125	1,439	134	152	633	11.5	1.1	1.2	5.1	
Vernon Hatton	G	Kentucky	1	1961–1962	15									
Elvin Hayes^ (#11)	F/C	Houston	9	1972–1981	731	29,218	9,305	1,294	15,551	40.0	12.7	1.8	21.3	
Jarvis Hayes	F	Georgia	4	2003–2007	226	5,746	777	303	2,007	25.4	3.4	1.3	8.9	
Brendan Haywood	C	North Carolina	9	2001–2010	579	14,181	3,648	348	4,460	24.5	6.3	0.6	7.7	
Spencer Haywood^	F/C	Detroit Mercy	2	1981–1983	114	2,861	605	94	1,322	25.1	5.3	0.8	11.6	
Brian Heaney	G	Acadia	1	1969–1970	14	70	4	6	28	5.0	0.3	0.4	2.0	
Tom Henderson	G	Hawaii	3	1976–1979	186	5,619	471	1,037	2,068	30.2	2.5	5.6	11.1	
JJ Hickson	F/C	NC State	1	2015–2016	15	131	45	7	69	8.7	3.0	0.5	4.6	
Wayne Hightower	F/C	Kansas	3	1964–1967	94	1,716	545	87	660	18.3	5.8	0.9	7.0	
Gary Hill	G	Oklahoma City	1	1964–1965	3	15	1	1	0	5.0	0.3	0.3	0.0	
Kirk Hinrich	G	Kansas	1	2010–2011	48	1,471	129	210	531	30.6	2.7	4.4	11.1	
Paul Hogue	C	Cincinnati	1	1963–1964	9	58	16	1	7	6.4	1.8	0.1	0.8	
Aaron Holiday	G	UCLA	1	2021–2022	41	663	67	78	251	16.2	1.6	1.9	6.1	
Brad Holland	G	UCLA	1	1981–1982	13	185	13	16	57	14.2	1.0	1.2	4.4	
Ryan Hollins	C	UCLA	1	2015–2016	5	48	11	0	8	9.6	2.2	0.0	1.6	
Richaun Holmes	F/C	Bowling Green	2	2023–2025	48	852	281	52	572	17.8	5.9	1.1	7.3	
Tito Horford	C	Miami (FL)	1	1993–1994	3	28	3	0	0	9.3	1.0	0.0	0.0	
Ed Horton	F	Iowa	1	1989–1990	45	374	108	19	202	8.3	2.4	0.4	4.5	
Danuel House	G	Texas A&M	1	2016–2017	1	1	1	0	0	1.0	1.0	0.0	0.0	
Dwight Howard^	C	SACA (GA)	1	2018–2019	9	230	83	4	115	25.6	9.2	0.4	12.8	
Josh Howard	G/F	Wake Forest	2	2009–2011	22	500	87	28	210	22.7	4.0	1.3	9.5	
Juwan Howard^{+}	F	Michigan	7	1994–2001	464	17,845	3,448	1,552	8,530	38.5	7.4	3.3	18.4	
Bailey Howell^	F	Mississippi State	2	1964–1966	158	5,303	1,642	363	2,898	33.6	10.4	2.3	18.3	
Lester Hudson	G	UT Martin	1	2010–2011	11	73	5	17	18	6.6	0.5	1.5	1.6	
Jay Huff	C	Virginia	1	2022–2023	7	95	21	10	51	13.6	3.0	1.4	7.3	
Larry Hughes	G	Saint Louis	3	2002–2005	189	6,556	1,016	638	3,350	34.7	5.4	3.4	17.7	
Kris Humphries	F/C	Minnesota	2	2014–2016	92	1,811	531	73	689	19.7	5.8	0.8	7.5	
Les Hunter	F/C	Loyola (IL)	1	1964–1965	24	114	50	11	42	4.8	2.1	0.5	1.8	
Chandler Hutchison	F	Boise State	1	2020–2021	18	282	58	13	94	15.7	3.2	0.7	5.2	

=== I to J ===
|-

All-time roster
Player	Pos.	Pre-draft team	Yrs	Seasons	Statistics									Ref.
Player	Pos.	Pre-draft team	Yrs	Seasons	GP	MP	REB	AST	PTS	MPG	RPG	APG	PPG	Ref.
Byron Irvin	G	Missouri	2	1990–1991; 1992–1993	37	361	49	26	193	9.8	1.3	0.7	5.2	
Cedric Jackson	G	Cleveland State	1	2009–2010	4	39	3	6	12	9.8	0.8	1.5	3.0	
Jaren Jackson	G/F	Georgetown	1	1996–1997	75	1,133	132	65	374	15.1	1.8	0.9	5.0	
Quenton Jackson	G	Texas A&M	1	2022–2023	9	135	8	15	56	15.0	0.9	1.7	6.2	
Randell Jackson	F	Florida State	1	1998–1999	27	271	54	8	114	10.0	2.0	0.3	4.2	
Mike James	G	Duquesne	2	2008–2010	57	1,621	129	198	529	28.4	2.3	3.5	9.3	
Antawn Jamison^{+}	F	North Carolina	6	2004–2010	421	16,307	3,735	773	8,736	38.7	8.9	1.8	20.8	
Othyus Jeffers	G	Robert Morris (IL)	1	2010–2011	16	314	65	19	91	19.6	4.1	1.2	5.7	
Jared Jeffries	F	Indiana	4	2002–2006	256	6,163	1,235	408	1,555	24.1	4.8	1.6	6.1	
Trey Jemison	C	UAB	4	2023–2024	2	1	1	0	0	0.5	0.5	0.0	0.0	
John Jenkins	G	Vanderbilt	1	2018–2019	4	14	1	1	6	3.5	0.3	0.3	1.5	
Brandon Jennings	G	Oak Hill Academy (VA)	1	2016–2017	23	374	44	108	81	16.3	1.9	4.7	3.5	
AJ Johnson	G	SoCal Academy (CA)	2	2024–2026	47	809	83	91	270	17.2	1.8	1.9	5.7	
Alize Johnson	F	Missouri State	1	2021–2022	3	18	12	0	4	6.0	4.0	0.0	1.3	
Andy Johnson	G/F	Portland	1	1961–1962	71	2,193	351	228	1,014	30.9	4.9	3.2	14.3	
Buck Johnson	F	Alabama	1	1992–1993	73	1,287	195	89	478	17.6	2.7	1.2	6.5	
Charles Johnson	G	California	2	1977–1979	121	2,626	295	259	1,075	21.7	2.4	2.1	8.9	
Frank Johnson	G	Wake Forest	7	1981–1988	382	10,021	751	1,961	3,987	26.2	2.0	5.1	10.4	
George Johnson	C	Stephen F. Austin	1	1970–1971	24	337	114	10	93	14.0	4.8	0.4	3.9	
George Johnson	F/C	St. John's	1	1985–1986	2	7	2	0	4	3.5	1.0	0.0	2.0	
Gus Johnson^ (#25)	F/C	Idaho	9	1963–1972	560	19,723	7,243	1,510	9,781	35.2	12.9	2.7	17.5	
Tre Johnson^{x}	G	Texas	1	2025–2026	60	1,443	170	122	733	24.1	2.8	2.0	12.2	
Wesley Johnson	G/F	Syracuse	1	2018–2019	12	157	18	7	33	13.1	1.5	0.6	2.8	
Anthony Jones	G/F	UNLV	1	1986–1987	16	114	9	7	37	7.1	0.6	0.4	2.3	
Charles Jones	F/C	Albany State	9	1984–1993	595	12,633	2,894	573	1,688	21.2	4.9	1.0	2.8	
Charles Jones	F	Louisville	1	1988–1989	43	516	140	18	110	12.0	3.3	0.4	2.6	
Colby Jones	G	Xavier	1	2024–2025	15	385	64	37	131	25.7	4.3	2.5	8.7	
Jimmy Jones	G	Grambling State	3	1974–1977	140	2,590	272	283	901	18.5	1.9	2.0	6.4	
Popeye Jones	F	Murray State	2	2000–2002	124	2,558	798	158	716	20.6	6.4	1.3	5.8	
Tyus Jones	G	Duke	1	2023–2024	66	1,933	179	485	790	29.3	2.7	7.3	12.0	
Wali Jones	G	Villanova	1	1964–1965	77	1,250	140	200	407	16.2	1.8	2.6	5.3	
Michael Jordan^	G/F	North Carolina	2	2001–2003	142	5,124	836	621	3,015	36.1	5.9	4.4	21.2	
Reggie Jordan	G	New Mexico State	1	1999–2000	36	243	41	32	41	6.8	1.1	0.9	1.1	

=== K to L ===
|-

All-time roster
Player	Pos.	Pre-draft team	Yrs	Seasons	Statistics									Ref.
Player	Pos.	Pre-draft team	Yrs	Seasons	GP	MP	REB	AST	PTS	MPG	RPG	APG	PPG	Ref.
Johnny Kerr	F/C	Illinois	1	1965–1966	71	1,770	586	225	781	24.9	8.3	3.2	11.0	
Albert King	G/F	Maryland	1	1991–1992	6	59	11	5	31	9.8	1.8	0.8	5.2	
Bernard King^	F	Tennessee	4	1987–1991	296	9,691	1,387	1,154	6,516	32.7	4.7	3.9	22.0	
Gerard King	F	Nicholls	2	1999–2001	107	1,766	379	80	543	16.5	3.5	0.7	5.1	
Maurice King	G	Kansas	1	1962–1963	37	954	102	142	216	25.8	2.8	3.8	5.8	
Corey Kispert	F	Gonzaga	5	2021–2026	311	7,933	866	463	3,403	25.5	2.8	1.5	10.9	
Brevin Knight	G	Stanford	1	2003–2004	32	598	61	102	136	18.7	1.9	3.2	4.3	
Don Kojis	F	Marquette	1	1963–1964	78	1,148	309	57	488	14.7	4.0	0.7	6.3	
Joe Kopicki	F	Detroit Mercy	2	1982–1984	76	879	228	55	287	11.6	3.0	0.7	3.8	
Tom Kozelko	F	Toledo	3	1973–1976	189	1,911	346	99	407	10.1	1.8	0.5	2.2	
Tom Kropp	G	Nebraska-Kearney	1	1975–1976	25	72	15	8	19	2.9	0.6	0.3	0.8	
Mitch Kupchak	F/C	North Carolina	5	1976–1981	337	7,261	2,058	299	4,089	21.5	6.1	0.9	12.1	
Kyle Kuzma	F	Utah	4	2021–2025	232	7,611	1,673	847	4,526	32.8	7.2	3.7	19.5	
Skal Labissière	F	Kentucky	1	2025–2026	3	38	9	3	13	12.7	3.0	1.0	4.3	
Christian Laettner	F/C	Duke	4	2000–2004	206	5,373	1,188	532	1,650	26.1	5.8	2.6	8.0	
James Lang	C	Central Park Christian HS (AL)	1	2006–2007	11	55	11	2	11	5.0	1.0	0.2	1.0	
York Larese	G	North Carolina	1	1961–1962	8	57	6	9	25	7.1	0.8	1.1	3.1	
Manny Leaks	F/C	Niagara	1	1973–1974	53	845	244	25	216	15.9	4.6	0.5	4.1	
Tim Legler	G	La Salle	4	1995–1999	130	2,410	205	167	898	18.5	1.6	1.3	6.9	
Alex Len	C	Maryland	1	2020–2021	57	903	249	46	407	15.8	4.4	0.8	7.1	
Bobby Leonard^	G	Indiana	2	1961–1963	102	3,343	267	521	1,352	32.8	2.6	5.1	13.3	
Cedric Lewis	F/C	Maryland	1	1995–1996	3	4	2	0	4	1.3	0.7	0.0	1.3	
Rashard Lewis	F	Alief Elsik HS (TX)	2	2010–2012	60	1,743	293	90	581	29.1	4.9	1.5	9.7	
Steve Lingenfelter	F	South Dakota State	1	1982–1983	7	53	12	4	8	7.6	1.7	0.6	1.1	
Shaun Livingston	G	Peoria HS (IL)	2	2009–2010; 2012–2013	43	986	95	154	303	22.9	2.2	3.6	7.0	
Felipe López	G	St. John's	1	2000–2001	47	1,108	160	73	380	23.6	3.4	1.6	8.1	
Robin Lopez	C	Stanford	1	2020–2021	71	1,354	272	55	642	19.1	3.8	0.8	9.0	
Kevin Loughery	G	St. John's	9	1963–1972	591	18,677	1,854	2,363	9,833	31.6	3.1	4.0	16.6	
Stan Love	F	Oregon	2	1971–1973	146	2,322	638	98	1,046	15.9	4.4	0.7	7.2	
John Lucas II	G	Maryland	2	1981–1983	114	2,326	195	653	811	20.4	1.7	5.7	7.1	
Tyronn Lue	G	Nebraska	2	2001–2003	146	3,444	271	509	1,202	23.6	1.9	3.5	8.2	

=== M ===
|-

All-time roster
Player	Pos.	Pre-draft team	Yrs	Seasons	Statistics									Ref.
Player	Pos.	Pre-draft team	Yrs	Seasons	GP	MP	REB	AST	PTS	MPG	RPG	APG	PPG	Ref.
Sheldon Mac	G	Miami (FL)	1	2016–2017	30	287	34	15	90	9.6	1.1	0.5	3.0	
Shelvin Mack	G	Butler	2	2011–2013	71	920	108	154	267	13.0	1.5	2.2	3.8	
Don MacLean	F	UCLA	3	1992–1995	176	4,213	754	250	2,202	23.9	4.3	1.4	12.5	
Ian Mahinmi	C	(France) STB Le Havre	4	2016–2020	180	3,006	808	146	961	16.7	4.5	0.8	5.3	
Rick Mahorn	F/C	Hampton	5	1980–1985	373	11,156	3,044	542	3,345	29.9	8.2	1.5	9.0	
Jeff Malone^{+}	G	Mississippi State	7	1983–1990	548	17,984	1,458	1,523	11,083	32.8	2.7	2.8	20.2	
Moses Malone^	F/C	Petersburg HS (VA)	2	1986–1988	152	5,180	1,708	232	3,367	34.1	11.2	1.5	22.2	
Steve Malovic	F	San Diego State	1	1979–1980	1	6	0	0	1	6.0	0.0	0.0	1.0	
Ed Manning	F	Jackson State	3	1967–1970	163	1,839	656	55	646	11.3	4.0	0.3	4.0	
Nick Mantis	G	Northwestern	1	1962–1963	33	626	79	76	196	19.0	2.4	2.3	5.9	
Jack Marin^{+}	G/F	Duke	6	1966–1972	480	14,864	2,972	1,019	8,017	31.0	6.2	2.1	16.7	
Cartier Martin	F	Kansas State	4	2009–2013	118	1,741	253	55	688	14.8	2.1	0.5	5.8	
Jaylen Martin	F	FSUS (FL)	1	2024–2025	13	234	44	17	75	18.0	3.4	1.3	5.8	
Roger Mason Jr.	G	Virginia	3	2006–2008; 2011–2012	194	2,897	244	216	1,175	14.9	1.3	1.1	6.1	
Garrison Mathews	G	Lipscomb	2	2019–2021	82	1,265	111	36	452	15.4	1.4	0.4	5.5	
Wes Matthews	G	Wisconsin	1	1980–1981	45	1,161	67	199	552	25.8	1.5	4.4	12.3	
Eric Maynor	G	VCU	1	2013–2014	23	215	24	40	52	9.3	1.0	1.7	2.3	
Bob McCann	F	Morehead State	1	1995–1996	62	653	143	24	188	10.5	2.3	0.4	3.0	
Andre McCarter	G	UCLA	1	1980–1981	43	448	39	73	122	10.4	0.9	1.7	2.8	
CJ McCollum	G	Lehigh	1	2025–2026	35	1,082	124	126	658	30.9	3.5	3.6	18.8	
Keith McCord	G	UAB	1	1980–1981	2	9	2	1	4	4.5	1.0	0.5	2.0	
Chris McCullough	F	Syracuse	2	2016–2018	21	98	27	4	47	4.7	1.3	0.2	2.2	
Jalen McDaniels	F	San Diego State	1	2024–2025	4	7	0	1	0	1.8	0.0	0.3	0.0	
JaVale McGee	C	Nevada	4	2008–2012	255	5,428	1,533	100	2,159	21.3	6.0	0.4	8.5	
Bill McGill	F/C	Utah	2	1962–1964	66	637	177	38	473	9.7	2.7	0.6	7.2	
Dominic McGuire	F	Fresno State	3	2007–2010	190	3,007	628	246	479	15.8	3.3	1.3	2.5	
Jim McIlvaine	C	Marquette	2	1994–1996	135	1,729	335	21	278	12.8	2.5	0.2	2.1	
Jeff McInnis	G	North Carolina	1	1998–1999	35	427	21	73	130	12.2	0.6	2.1	3.7	
Kevin McKenna	G/F	Creighton	1	1985–1986	30	430	36	23	174	14.3	1.2	0.8	5.8	
Stan McKenzie	G/F	NYU	1	1967–1968	50	653	121	24	204	13.1	2.4	0.5	4.1	
Tom McMillen	F/C	Maryland	3	1983–1986	187	3,704	522	160	1,514	19.8	2.8	0.9	8.1	
Jordan McRae	G	Tennessee	2	2018–2020	56	987	144	112	530	17.6	2.6	2.0	9.5	
Thales McReynolds	G	Miles	1	1965–1966	5	28	6	1	3	5.6	1.2	0.2	0.6	
Jodie Meeks	G	Kentucky	1	2017–2018	77	1,119	126	70	487	14.5	1.6	0.9	6.3	
Khris Middleton	F	Texas A&M	2	2024–2026	48	1,136	186	159	501	23.7	3.9	3.3	10.4	
C. J. Miles	G/F	Skyline HS (TX)	1	2019–2020	10	161	12	12	64	16.1	1.2	1.2	6.4	
Eddie Miles	G/F	Seattle	2	1969–1971	66	1,593	171	114	639	24.1	2.6	1.7	9.7	
Andre Miller	G	Utah	2	2013–2015	79	1,043	134	240	290	13.2	1.7	3.0	3.7	
Mike Miller	G/F	Florida	1	2009–2010	54	1,805	336	212	586	33.4	6.2	3.9	10.9	
Earl Monroe^ (#10)	G	Winston-Salem State	5	1967–1972	328	12,084	1,223	1,507	7,775	36.8	3.7	4.6	23.7	
Greg Monroe	F/C	Georgetown	1	2021–2022	2	18	10	1	8	9.0	5.0	0.5	4.0	
Markieff Morris	F	Kansas	4	2015–2019	210	5,937	1,234	365	2,630	28.3	5.9	1.7	12.5	
Monté Morris	G	Iowa State	1	2022–2023	62	1,695	210	326	636	27.3	3.4	5.3	10.3	
Perry Moss	G	Northeastern	1	1985–1986	12	160	25	19	55	13.3	2.1	1.6	4.6	
Lawrence Moten	G	Syracuse	1	1997–1998	8	27	1	3	9	3.4	0.1	0.4	1.1	
Gheorghe Mureșan	C	(France) Pau-Orthez	4	1993–1997	276	6,461	1,889	141	2,915	23.4	6.8	0.5	10.6	
Jay Murphy	F	Boston College	2	1986–1988	30	187	55	6	91	6.2	1.8	0.2	3.0	
Tracy Murray	F	UCLA	4	1996–2000	280	6,525	882	261	3,101	23.3	3.2	0.9	11.1	
Dorie Murrey	F/C	Detroit Mercy	2	1970–1972	120	1,117	340	48	330	9.3	2.8	0.4	2.8	
Toure' Murry	G/F	Wichita State	1	2014–2015	4	17	1	1	6	4.3	0.3	0.3	1.5	
Mike Muscala	F	Bucknell	1	2023–2024	24	338	75	22	95	14.1	3.1	0.9	4.0	

=== N to O ===
|-

All-time roster
Player	Pos.	Pre-draft team	Yrs	Seasons	Statistics									Ref.
Player	Pos.	Pre-draft team	Yrs	Seasons	GP	MP	REB	AST	PTS	MPG	RPG	APG	PPG	Ref.
Hamady N'Diaye	C	Rutgers	2	2010–2012	19	83	7	0	14	4.4	0.4	0.0	0.7	
Shabazz Napier	G	UConn	1	2019–2020	20	488	48	75	2,31	24.4	2.4	3.8	11.6	
Gary Neal	G	Towson	1	2015–2016	40	807	83	47	390	20.2	2.1	1.2	9.8	
Don Nelson^	F	Iowa	1	1962–1963	62	1,071	279	72	419	17.3	4.5	1.2	6.8	
Louie Nelson	G	Washington	1	1973–1974	49	556	70	52	239	11.3	1.4	1.1	4.9	
Nenê	F/C	(Brazil) Vasco da Gama	5	2011–2016	249	6,290	1,388	569	2,941	25.3	5.6	2.3	11.8	
Tyrone Nesby	F	UNLV	2	2000–2002	118	2,721	449	156	847	23.1	3.8	1.3	7.2	
Raul Neto	G	(Spain) Gipuzkoa	2	2020–2022	134	2,775	290	363	1,083	20.7	2.2	2.7	8.1	
Andrew Nicholson	F	St. Bonaventure	1	2016–2017	28	231	34	7	70	8.3	1.2	0.3	2.5	
Gaylon Nickerson	G	Northwestern Oklahoma State	1	1996–1997	1	6	1	0	2	6.0	1.0	0.0	2.0	
Mel Nowell	G	Ohio State	1	1962–1963	39	589	67	84	232	15.1	1.7	2.2	5.9	
Kendrick Nunn	G	Oakland	1	2022–2023	31	436	54	56	234	14.1	1.3	1.4	7.5	
Charles Oakley	F/C	Virginia Union	1	2002–2003	42	514	107	40	74	12.2	2.5	1.0	1.8	
Fabricio Oberto	F/C	(Argentina) Atenas	1	2009–2010	57	650	105	51	83	11.4	1.8	0.9	1.5	
Daniel Ochefu	C	Villanova	1	2016–2017	19	75	22	3	24	3.9	1.2	0.2	1.3	
Alan Ogg	C	UAB	1	1992–1993	3	3	4	0	5	1.0	1.3	0.0	1.7	
Don Ohl^{+}	G	Illinois	4	1964–1968	247	8,586	918	792	4,680	34.8	3.7	3.2	18.9	
Emeka Okafor	F/C	UConn	1	2012–2013	79	2,052	692	93	765	26.0	8.8	1.2	9.7	
Mike O'Koren	G/F	North Carolina	1	1986–1987	15	123	14	13	32	8.2	0.9	0.9	2.1	
Brian Oliver	G	Georgia Tech	1	1994–1995	6	42	4	4	14	7.0	0.7	0.7	2.3	
Jimmy Oliver	G/F	Purdue	1	1997–1998	1	10	2	1	5	10.0	2.0	1.0	5.0	
Eugene Omoruyi	F	Oregon	1	2023–2024	43	393	85	35	207	9.1	2.0	0.8	4.8	
Barry Orms	G	Saint Louis	1	1968–1969	64	916	158	49	181	14.3	2.5	0.8	2.8	
Kelly Oubre Jr.	F	Kansas	4	2015–2019	252	5,262	886	178	2,063	20.9	3.5	0.7	8.2	
Doug Overton	G	La Salle	3	1992–1995	188	3,443	318	495	1,160	18.3	1.7	2.6	6.2	
Larry Owens	F	Oral Roberts	1	2010–2011	5	112	11	7	31	22.4	2.2	1.4	6.2	

=== P ===
|-

All-time roster
Player	Pos.	Pre-draft team	Yrs	Seasons	Statistics									Ref.
Player	Pos.	Pre-draft team	Yrs	Seasons	GP	MP	REB	AST	PTS	MPG	RPG	APG	PPG	Ref.
Joe Pace	C	Coppin State	2	1976–1978	79	557	168	27	255	7.1	2.1	0.3	3.2	
Robert Pack	G	USC	1	1995–1996	31	1,084	132	242	560	35.0	4.3	7.8	18.1	
Gerald Paddio	G/F	UNLV	1	1993–1994	8	74	11	7	30	9.3	1.4	0.9	3.8	
Jannero Pargo	G	Arkansas	1	2012–2013	7	102	6	14	21	14.6	0.9	2.0	3.0	
Jabari Parker	F	Duke	1	2018–2019	25	682	180	68	374	27.3	7.2	2.7	15.0	
Cherokee Parks	F/C	Duke	1	2000–2001	13	178	40	7	48	13.7	3.1	0.5	3.7	
Anžejs Pasečņiks	C	(Spain) Herbalife Gran Canaria	2	2019–2021	28	443	108	19	156	15.8	3.9	0.7	5.6	
Tom Patterson	F	Ouachita Baptist	2	1972–1974	25	100	24	5	56	4.0	1.0	0.2	2.2	
Gary Payton II	G	Oregon State	2	2018–2020	32	448	82	52	124	14.0	2.6	1.6	3.9	
Oleksiy Pecherov	C	(Ukraine) Kyiv	2	2007–2009	67	597	142	9	241	8.9	2.1	0.1	3.6	
Anthony Peeler	G	Missouri	1	2004–2005	40	529	65	57	153	13.2	1.6	1.4	3.8	
Mike Peplowski	C	Michigan State	1	1995–1996	2	5	0	0	0	2.5	0.0	0.0	0.0	
Mel Peterson	G/F	Wheaton (IL)	1	1963–1964	2	3	1	0	2	1.5	0.5	0.0	1.0	
Roger Phegley	G/F	Bradley	2	1978–1980	79	1,124	137	85	634	14.2	1.7	1.1	8.0	
Paul Pierce^	G/F	Kansas	1	2014–2015	73	1,914	294	144	868	26.2	4.0	2.0	11.9	
Dave Piontek	F/C	Xavier	1	1961–1962	45	614	155	31	205	13.6	3.4	0.7	4.6	
Jordan Poole	G	Michigan	2	2023–2025	146	4,347	415	646	2,747	29.8	2.8	4.4	18.8	
Kevin Porter	G	Saint Francis (PA)	6	1972–1975; 1979–1981; 1982–1983	395	10,426	614	2,593	4,194	26.4	1.6	6.6	10.6	
Otto Porter	F	Georgetown	6	2013–2019	384	10,255	1,906	553	4,121	26.7	5.0	1.4	10.7	
Bobby Portis	F	Arkansas	1	2018–2019	28	768	242	43	400	27.4	8.6	1.5	14.3	
Kristaps Porziņģis	F/C	(Spain) Sevilla	2	2021–2023	82	2,599	696	224	1,881	31.7	8.5	2.7	22.9	
Dominic Pressley	G	Boston College	1	1988–1989	10	107	14	22	21	10.7	1.4	2.2	2.1	
A. J. Price	G	UConn	1	2012–2013	57	1,278	114	205	441	22.4	2.0	3.6	7.7	
Brent Price	G	Oklahoma	3	1992–1994; 1995–1996	214	3,936	421	783	1,472	18.4	2.0	3.7	6.9	
Mark Price	G	Georgia Tech	1	1995–1996	7	127	7	18	56	18.1	1.0	2.6	8.0	
Kevin Pritchard	G	Kansas	1	1995–1996	2	22	2	7	7	11.0	1.0	3.5	3.5	
Laron Profit	G/F	Maryland	3	1999–2001; 2004–2005	110	1,258	166	151	337	11.4	1.5	1.4	3.1	

=== Q to R ===
|-

All-time roster
Player	Pos.	Pre-draft team	Yrs	Seasons	Statistics									Ref.
Player	Pos.	Pre-draft team	Yrs	Seasons	GP	MP	REB	AST	PTS	MPG	RPG	APG	PPG	Ref.
Bob Quick	G/F	Xavier	2	1968–1970	43	221	37	15	127	5.1	0.9	0.3	3.0	
Peter John Ramos	C	(Puerto Rico) Criollos de Caguas	1	2004–2005	6	20	4	0	11	3.3	0.7	0.0	1.8	
Chasson Randle	G	Stanford	1	2018–2019	49	743	56	97	271	15.2	1.1	2.0	5.5	
Julian Reese^{x}	F/C	Maryland	1	2025–2026	13	402	137	24	154	30.9	10.5	1.8	11.8	
Don Reid	F	Georgetown	1	1999–2000	17	333	77	10	109	19.6	4.5	0.6	6.4	
Glen Rice Jr.	G	Georgia Tech	2	2013–2015	16	152	24	9	43	9.5	1.5	0.6	2.7	
Kadary Richmond	G	St. John's	1	2025–2026	3	67	10	8	25	22.3	3.3	2.7	8.3	
Mitch Richmond^	G	Kansas State	3	1998–2001	161	5,525	494	418	2,866	34.3	3.1	2.6	17.8	
Will Riley^{x}	F	Illinois	1	2025–2026	74	1,633	212	146	764	22.1	2.9	2.0	10.3	
Rich Rinaldi	G	Saint Peter's	3	1971–1974	79	853	93	73	393	10.8	1.2	0.9	5.0	
Mike Riordan	G/F	Providence	6	1971–1977	418	12,463	1,409	1,154	5,185	29.8	3.4	2.8	12.4	
Austin Rivers	G	Duke	1	2018–2019	29	683	71	58	210	23.6	2.4	2.0	7.2	
Anthony Roberts	G/F	Oral Roberts	1	1980–1981	26	350	68	20	127	13.5	2.6	0.8	4.9	
Cliff Robinson	F	USC	2	1984–1986	138	4,433	1,226	335	2,463	32.1	8.9	2.4	17.8	
Devin Robinson	F	Florida	2	2017–2019	8	108	25	6	49	13.5	3.1	0.8	6.1	
Flynn Robinson	G	Wyoming	1	1972–1973	38	583	55	77	264	15.3	1.4	2.0	6.9	
Jerome Robinson	G	Boston College	2	2019–2021	38	808	107	66	280	21.3	2.8	1.7	7.4	
Justin Robinson	G	Virginia Tech	1	2019–2020	9	49	5	7	13	5.4	0.6	0.8	1.4	
Larry Robinson	G/F	Centenary	2	1990–1991; 1992–1993	16	288	31	27	98	18.0	1.9	1.7	6.1	
Truck Robinson	F/C	Tennessee State	3	1974–1977	199	4,378	1,224	198	2,017	22.0	6.2	1.0	10.1	
Ryan Rollins	G	Toledo	1	2023–2024	10	66	11	11	41	6.6	1.1	1.1	4.1	
Quinton Ross	G	SMU	1	2009–2010	25	261	22	5	38	10.4	0.9	0.2	1.5	
Doug Roth	C	Tennessee	1	1989–1990	42	412	120	20	81	9.8	2.9	0.5	1.9	
Dan Roundfield	F/C	Central Michigan	2	1985–1987	115	2,990	812	206	1,155	26.0	7.1	1.8	10.0	
Michael Ruffin	F	Tulsa	3	2004–2007	185	2,543	665	97	233	13.7	3.6	0.5	1.3	
Jeff Ruland^{+}	F/C	Iona	5	1981–1986	303	10,708	3,285	985	5,653	35.3	10.8	3.3	18.7	
Bryon Russell	F	Long Beach State	1	2002–2003	70	1,388	208	72	315	19.8	3.0	1.0	4.5	

=== S ===
|-

All-time roster
Player	Pos.	Pre-draft team	Yrs	Seasons	Statistics									Ref.
Player	Pos.	Pre-draft team	Yrs	Seasons	GP	MP	REB	AST	PTS	MPG	RPG	APG	PPG	Ref.
Ralph Sampson^	F/C	Virginia	1	1991–1992	10	108	30	4	22	10.8	3.0	0.4	2.2	
Alex Sarr^{x}	C	(Australia) Perth Wildcats	1	2024–2026	115	3,119	790	291	1,652	27.1	6.9	2.5	14.4	
Tomáš Satoranský	G	(Spain) Sevilla	4	2016–2019; 2021–2022	232	4,942	656	885	1,494	21.3	2.8	3.8	6.4	
Woody Sauldsberry	F/C	Texas Southern	2	1961–1963	103	1,664	367	66	697	30.8	6.8	1.2	6.8	
DeWayne Scales	F	LSU	1	1983–1984	2	13	3	0	6	6.5	1.5	0.0	3.0	
Jordan Schakel	G/F	San Diego State	2	2021–2023	6	36	8	1	8	6.0	1.3	0.2	1.3	
Admiral Schofield	F	Tennessee	1	2019–2020	33	368	47	15	99	11.2	1.4	0.5	3.0	
Mike Scott	F	Virginia	1	2017–2018	76	1,406	247	80	668	18.5	3.3	1.1	8.8	
Ray Scott	F/C	Portland	4	1966–1970	263	7,454	2,646	490	3,460	28.3	10.1	1.9	13.2	
Kevin Séraphin	F	(France) Cholet Basket	5	2010–2015	326	5,345	1,194	176	2,097	16.4	3.7	0.5	6.4	
Ramon Sessions	G	Nevada	3	2014–2016; 2017–2018	125	2,438	298	375	1,104	19.5	2.4	3.0	8.8	
Tom Sewell	G	Lamar	1	1984–1985	21	87	4	6	20	4.1	0.2	0.3	1.0	
Mustafa Shakur	G	Arizona	1	2010–2011	22	159	22	25	51	7.2	1.0	1.1	2.3	
Landry Shamet	G	Wichita State	1	2023–2024	46	726	62	54	327	15.7	1.3	1.2	7.1	
God Shammgod	G	Providence	1	1997–1998	20	146	7	36	61	7.3	0.4	1.8	3.1	
Gene Shue	G	Maryland	1	1963–1964	47	963	94	150	198	20.5	2.0	3.2	4.2	
Bobby Simmons	G/F	DePaul	2	2001–2003	66	721	129	37	232	10.9	2.0	0.6	3.5	
Chris Singleton	F	Florida State	3	2011–2014	148	2,605	472	92	612	17.6	3.2	0.6	4.1	
James Singleton	F	Murray State	2	2009–2010; 2011–2012	44	1,028	302	37	293	23.4	6.9	0.8	6.7	
Scott Skiles	G	Michigan State	1	1994–1995	62	2,077	159	452	805	33.5	2.6	7.3	13.0	
Jeff Slade	F	Kenyon	1	1962–1963	3	20	7	0	4	6.7	2.3	0.0	1.3	
Jerry Sloan^	G/F	Evansville	1	1965–1966	59	952	230	110	338	16.1	3.9	1.9	5.7	
Marcus Smart	G	Oklahoma State	1	2024–2025	15	280	29	38	140	18.7	1.9	2.5	9.3	
Clinton Smith	F	Cleveland State	1	1990–1991	5	45	4	4	7	9.0	0.8	0.8	1.4	
Ish Smith	G	Wake Forest	3	2019–2022	140	3,326	452	652	1,277	23.8	3.2	4.7	9.1	
Jason Smith	F/C	Colorado State	3	2016–2019	119	1,483	348	63	577	12.5	2.9	0.5	4.8	
LaBradford Smith	G	Louisville	3	1991–1994	124	2,302	195	290	917	18.6	1.6	2.3	7.4	
Michael Smith	F	Providence	2	1999–2001	125	2,755	893	157	590	22.0	7.1	1.3	4.7	
Mike Smith	F	Louisiana-Monroe	1	2000–2001	17	180	22	10	51	10.6	1.3	0.6	3.0	
Ricky Sobers	G	UNLV	2	1982–1984	122	4,062	281	595	1,911	33.3	2.3	4.9	15.7	
Willie Somerset	G	Duquesne	1	1965–1966	8	98	15	9	45	12.3	1.9	1.1	5.6	
Darius Songaila	F	Wake Forest	3	2006–2009	194	3,775	632	267	1,343	19.5	3.3	1.4	6.9	
Jerry Stackhouse	G/F	North Carolina	2	2002–2004	96	3,521	352	419	1,870	36.7	3.7	4.4	19.5	
Dave Stallworth	F/C	Wichita State	3	1971–1974	182	3,490	759	270	1,364	19.2	4.2	1.5	7.5	
Larry Staverman	F	Thomas More	2	1962–1964	39	701	171	45	253	18.0	4.4	1.2	6.5	
DeShawn Stevenson	G	Washington Union HS (CA)	4	2006–2010	236	6,485	592	612	2,135	27.5	2.5	2.6	9.0	
Dennis Stewart	F	Michigan	1	1970–1971	2	6	3	1	4	3.0	1.5	0.5	2.0	
Larry Stewart	F	Coppin State	4	1991–1995	200	4,433	906	286	1,705	22.2	4.5	1.4	8.5	
Awvee Storey	G/F	Arizona State	1	2005–2006	25	116	22	4	43	4.6	0.9	0.2	1.7	
Rod Strickland	G	DePaul	5	1996–2001	304	10,857	1,316	2,712	4,719	35.7	4.3	8.9	15.5	
Roger Strickland	F	Jacksonville	1	1963–1964	1	4	0	0	2	4.0	0.0	0.0	2.0	
Derek Strong	F	Xavier	1	1991–1992	1	12	5	1	3	12.0	5.0	1.0	3.0	
Craig Sword	G	Mississippi State	1	2021–2022	3	19	0	1	6	6.3	0.0	0.3	2.0	

=== T to U ===
|-

All-time roster
Player	Pos.	Pre-draft team	Yrs	Seasons	Statistics									Ref.
Player	Pos.	Pre-draft team	Yrs	Seasons	GP	MP	REB	AST	PTS	MPG	RPG	APG	PPG	Ref.
Donell Taylor	G	UAB	2	2005–2007	98	834	106	90	266	8.5	1.1	0.9	2.7	
Garrett Temple	G	LSU	4	2012–2016	258	4,480	493	383	1,186	17.4	1.9	1.5	4.6	
Carlos Terry	G/F	Winston-Salem State	3	1980–1983	94	1,078	227	124	285	11.5	2.4	1.3	3.0	
Billy Thomas	G	Kansas	1	2005–2006	17	131	14	9	38	7.7	0.8	0.5	2.2	
Etan Thomas	F	Syracuse	7	2001–2007; 2008–2009	373	6,681	1,840	146	2,234	17.9	4.9	0.4	6.0	
Isaiah Thomas	G	Washington	1	2019–2020	40	925	68	146	488	23.1	1.7	3.7	12.2	
JT Thor	F	Auburn	1	2024–2025	11	207	42	5	43	18.8	3.8	0.5	3.9	
Rod Thorn^	G	West Virginia	1	1963–1964	75	2,594	360	281	1,080	34.6	4.8	3.7	14.4	
Al Thornton	F	Florida State	2	2009–2011	73	1,743	258	80	649	23.9	3.5	1.1	8.9	
Bob Thornton	F/C	UC Irvine	1	1995–1996	7	31	12	0	3	4.4	1.7	0.0	0.4	
Marcus Thornton	G	LSU	2	2015–2017	47	799	111	60	337	17.0	2.4	1.3	7.2	
Otis Thorpe	F/C	Providence	1	1998–1999	49	1,539	334	101	554	31.4	6.8	2.1	11.3	
Isaiah Todd	F	Word of God (NC)	2	2021–2023	18	135	24	8	29	7.5	1.3	0.4	1.6	
John Tresvant	F/C	Seattle	3	1970–1973	187	3,219	838	192	1,163	17.2	4.5	1.0	6.2	
Al Tucker	F	Oklahoma Baptist	2	1969–1971	59	538	126	14	260	9.1	2.1	0.2	4.4	
Anthony Tucker	F	Wake Forest	1	1994–1995	62	982	170	68	243	15.8	2.7	1.1	3.9	
Ronny Turiaf	F	Gonzaga	1	2011–2012	4	58	12	5	6	14.5	3.0	1.3	1.5	
Andre Turner	G	Memphis	1	1991–1992	70	871	90	177	284	12.4	1.3	2.5	4.1	
Jack Turner	G/F	Louisville	1	1961–1962	42	567	85	44	200	13.5	2.0	1.0	4.8	
Melvin Turpin	C	Kentucky	1	1989–1990	59	818	221	27	276	13.9	3.7	0.5	4.7	
Charlie Tyra	F/C	Louisville	1	1961–1962	78	1,606	610	86	519	20.6	7.8	1.1	6.7	
Edwin Ubiles	G	Siena	1	2011–2012	4	52	10	1	14	13.0	2.5	0.3	3.5	
Wes Unseld^ (#41)	F/C	Louisville	13	1968–1981	984	35,832	13,769	3,822	10,624	36.4	14.0	3.9	10.8	
Jarrod Uthoff	F	Iowa	1	2019–2020	3	39	5	0	15	13.0	1.7	0.0	5.0	

=== V to Z ===
All-time roster
Player	Pos.	Pre-draft team	Yrs	Seasons	Statistics									Ref.
Player	Pos.	Pre-draft team	Yrs	Seasons	GP	MP	REB	AST	PTS	MPG	RPG	APG	PPG	Ref.
Jonas Valančiūnas	C	(Lithuania) Rytas	1	2024–2025	49	983	404	108	564	20.1	8.2	2.2	11.5	
David Vanterpool	G	St. Bonaventure	1	2000–2001	22	411	37	66	122	18.7	1.7	3.0	5.5	
Loy Vaught	F	Michigan	1	2000–2001	14	157	50	7	54	11.2	3.6	0.5	3.9	
Jan Veselý	F	(Serbia) Partizan	3	2011–2014	141	2,149	484	85	497	15.2	3.4	0.6	3.5	
Jay Vincent	F	Michigan State	1	1986–1987	51	1,386	210	85	678	27.2	4.1	1.7	13.3	
Tristan Vukčević^{x}	C	(Serbia) Partizan Belgrade	3	2023–2026	94	1,337	313	107	856	14.2	3.3	1.1	9.1	
Moritz Wagner	F/C	Michigan	2	2019–2021	70	1,210	292	88	571	17.3	4.2	1.3	8.2	
Darrell Walker	G	Arkansas	4	1987–1991	283	8,693	1,846	1,707	2,349	30.7	6.5	6.0	8.3	
Horace Walker	F	Michigan State	1	1961–1962	65	1,331	466	69	438	20.5	7.2	1.1	6.7	
Kenny Walker	F	Kentucky	2	1993–1995	97	1,663	336	40	408	17.1	3.5	0.4	4.2	
Phil Walker	G	Millersville	1	1977–1978	40	384	52	54	178	9.6	1.3	1.4	4.5	
Samaki Walker	F	Louisville	1	2004–2005	14	134	18	4	24	9.6	1.3	0.3	1.7	
John Wall^{+}	G	Kentucky	9	2010–2019	573	20,545	2,483	5,282	10,879	35.9	4.3	9.2	19.0	
Ben Wallace^	F/C	Virginia Union	3	1996–1999	147	2,552	766	38	520	17.4	5.2	0.3	3.5	
Rasheed Wallace	F/C	North Carolina	1	1995–1996	65	1,788	303	85	655	27.5	4.7	1.3	10.1	
Brad Wanamaker	G	Pittsburgh	1	2021–2022	1	27	4	7	7	27.0	4.0	7.0	7.0	
Ben Warley	G/F	Tennessee State	2	1965–1967	118	1,804	540	76	678	15.3	4.6	0.6	5.7	
Bryan Warrick	G	Saint Joseph's	2	1982–1984	75	981	91	169	235	13.1	1.2	2.3	3.1	
Stan Washington	G	San Diego	1	1974–1975	1	4	0	0	0	4.0	0.0	0.0	0.0	
Tremont Waters	G	LSU	1	2021–2022	1	8	0	0	2	8.0	0.0	0.0	2.0	
Jamir Watkins^{x}	G/F	Florida State	1	2025–2026	50	1,032	194	67	368	20.6	3.9	1.3	7.4	
Nick Weatherspoon	F	Illinois	4	1973–1977	222	3,798	1,041	146	1,700	17.1	4.7	0.7	7.7	
Chris Webber^	F/C	Michigan	4	1994–1998	212	8,240	2,049	935	4,441	38.9	9.7	4.4	20.9	
Jeff Webster	F	Oklahoma	1	1995–1996	11	58	7	3	18	5.3	0.6	0.3	1.6	
Martell Webster	G/F	Seattle Prep. (WA)	3	2012–2015	186	4,709	562	257	1,734	25.3	3.0	1.4	9.3	
Bob Weiss	G	Penn State	1	1976–1977	62	768	69	130	153	12.4	1.1	2.1	2.5	
Ralph Wells	G	Northwestern	1	1962–1963	3	48	6	7	2	16.0	2.0	2.3	0.7	
Walt Wesley	C	Kansas	1	1973–1974	39	400	136	14	168	10.3	3.5	0.4	4.3	
Roland West	G	Cincinnati	1	1967–1968	4	14	5	0	4	3.5	1.3	0.0	1.0	
Russell Westbrook	G	UCLA	1	2020–2021	65	2,369	750	763	1,445	36.4	11.5	11.7	22.2	
Ennis Whatley	G	Alabama	2	1985–1987	77	1,843	201	399	629	23.9	2.6	5.2	8.2	
Jahidi White	F/C	Georgetown	6	1998–2004	256	4,917	1,649	55	1,651	19.2	6.4	0.2	6.4	
Okaro White	F	Florida State	1	2018–2019	3	6	2	0	0	2.0	0.7	0.0	0.0	
Cam Whitmore^{x}	F	Villanova	1	2025–2026	21	354	58	15	193	16.9	2.8	0.7	9.2	
Chris Whitney	G	Clemson	8	1995–2002; 2003–2004	463	8,482	706	1,387	3,269	18.3	1.5	3.0	7.1	
Mike Wilks	G	Rice	1	2007–2008	4	44	6	3	5	11.0	1.5	0.8	1.3	
Aaron Williams	F/C	Xavier	1	1999–2000	81	1,545	409	58	616	19.1	5.0	0.7	7.6	
Alondes Williams	G	Wake Forest	1	2025–2026	4	101	25	12	44	25.3	6.3	3.0	11.0	
Freeman Williams	G/F	Portland State	1	1985–1986	9	110	12	7	69	12.2	1.3	0.8	7.7	
Gus Williams	G	USC	2	1984–1986	156	5,244	361	1,061	2,614	33.6	2.3	6.8	16.8	
Guy Williams	F	Washington State	1	1984–1985	21	119	27	9	61	5.7	1.3	0.4	2.9	
John Williams	F/C	LSU	5	1986–1991	293	8,187	1,696	996	3,623	27.9	5.8	3.4	12.4	
Johnathan Williams	F	Gonzaga	1	2019–2020	15	180	64	8	45	12.0	4.3	0.5	3.0	
Lorenzo Williams	F/C	Stetson	3	1996–1998; 1999–2000	41	451	120	8	85	11.0	2.9	0.2	2.1	
John Williamson	G	New Mexico State	2	1979–1981	39	715	52	56	391	18.3	1.3	1.4	10.0	
Mike Wilson	G	Marquette	1	1983–1984	6	26	1	3	1	4.3	0.2	0.5	0.2	
David Wingate	G/F	Georgetown	1	1991–1992	81	2,127	269	247	638	26.3	3.3	3.0	7.9	
Cassius Winston	G	Michigan State	2	2020–2022	29	137	10	19	55	4.7	0.3	0.7	1.9	
Garry Witts	G/F	Holy Cross	1	1981–1982	46	493	62	38	132	10.7	1.3	0.8	2.9	
Leon Wood	G	Cal State Fullerton	1	1985–1986	39	743	63	107	378	19.1	1.6	2.7	9.7	
Haywoode Workman	G	Oral Roberts	1	1990–1991	73	2,034	242	353	581	27.9	3.3	4.8	8.0	
Tom Workman	F/C	Seattle	2	1967–1969	22	96	28	2	54	4.4	1.3	0.1	2.5	
Delon Wright	G	Utah	2	2022–2024	83	1,677	239	276	503	20.2	2.9	3.3	6.1	
Larry Wright	G	Grambling State	4	1976–1980	297	5,831	462	1,012	2,489	19.6	1.6	3.4	8.4	
Yi Jianlian	F	(China) Guangdong Southern Tigers	1	2010–2011	63	1,112	248	25	355	17.7	3.9	0.4	5.6	
Nick Young	G/F	USC	5	2007–2012	335	7,661	638	327	3,872	22.9	1.9	1.0	11.6	
Trae Young^{x}	G	Oklahoma	1	2025–2026	5	104	15	31	76	20.8	3.0	6.2	15.2	
Gary Zeller	G	Drake	2	1970–1972	78	697	92	37	271	8.9	1.2	0.5	3.5	

== Assistant coaches ==
- Alexis Ajinça
- Randy Ayers
- Johnny Bach
- Gene Banks
- Bill Berry
- Mike Brown
- Adam Caporn
- Sam Cassell
- Larry Drew
- Patrick Ewing
- Brian James
- Don Newman
- Mike O'Koren
- J. J. Outlaw
- Brian Randle
- Ryan Saunders
- T. J. Sorrentine
- David Vanterpool
- Randy Wittman
- Tom Young
- Don Zierden

== Head coaches ==
- Scott Brooks
- Jim Brovelli
- Doug Collins
- Leonard Hamilton
- Gar Heard
- Eddie Jordan
- Brian Keefe
- Flip Saunders
- Ed Tapscott
- Wes Unseld Jr.
- Darrell Walker
- Randy Wittman

== See also ==
- List of Baltimore Bullets (1944–54) players
