= 1962 NBA draft =

Basketball player selection

General information
- Sport: Basketball
- Date: March 26, 1962
- Location: Plaza Hotel (New York City, New York)

Overview
- 102 total selections in 16 rounds
- League: NBA
- Territorial picks: Dave DeBusschere, Detroit Pistons; Jerry Lucas, Cincinnati Royals
- First selection: Bill McGill, Chicago Zephyrs
- Hall of Famers: 5: G Dave DeBusschere; F Jerry Lucas; C Zelmo Beaty; G John Havlicek; G Chet Walker

The 1962 NBA draft was the 16th annual draft of the National Basketball Association (NBA). The draft was held on March 26, 1962, before the 1962–63 season. In this draft, nine NBA teams took turns selecting amateur U.S. college basketball players. A player who had finished his four-year college eligibility was eligible for selection. If a player left college early, he would not be eligible for selection until his college class graduated. In each round, the teams selected in reverse order of their won–loss record in the previous season. Before the draft, a team could forfeit its first-round draft pick, then select any player from within a 50-mile radius of its home arena as their territorial pick. The Chicago Packers, who finished last in the previous season, were renamed the Chicago Zephyrs. The Philadelphia Warriors relocated to San Francisco and became the San Francisco Warriors prior to the start of the season. The draft consisted of 16 rounds, comprising 102 players selected.

== Draft selections and draftee career notes ==
Dave DeBusschere and Jerry Lucas were selected before the draft as the 'Detroit Pistons' and 'Cincinnati Royals' territorial picks, respectively. Bill McGill from the University of Utah was selected first overall by the Chicago Zephyrs. Terry Dischinger from Purdue University, who went on to win the Rookie of the Year Award in his first season, was selected eight overall by the Chicago Zephyrs. Four players from this draft, DeBusschere, Lucas, seventh pick John Havlicek and twelfth pick Chet Walker, have been inducted to the Basketball Hall of Fame. They were also named in the 50 Greatest Players in NBA History list announced at the league's 50th anniversary in 1996. Lucas initially opted to sign for the Cleveland Pipers of the American Basketball League (ABL). However, the Pipers folded before the start of the season and Lucas opted to sit out a year to complete his education. He eventually entered the NBA and went on to win the Rookie of the Year Award in the 1963–64 season. Lucas' achievements include an NBA championship with the New York Knicks in 1973, 5 All-NBA Team selections and 7 All-Star Game selections. DeBusschere's achievements include 2 NBA championships with the Knicks in 1970 and 1973, 1 All-NBA Team selection, 8 All-Star Game selections and 6 All-Defensive Team selections. In the 1964–65 season, he was named as a player-coach for the Pistons, becoming the youngest head coach in the NBA at the age of 24. He coached the Pistons for almost three years before returning to a full-time player. He also had a brief professional baseball career with the Chicago White Sox. He played two seasons in the Major League Baseball in 1962 and 1963, and another season in the minor-league before he gave up his dual-sport career to focus on basketball. He is one of only 12 athletes who have played in both NBA and MLB. Havlicek spent all of his 16-year playing career with the Boston Celtics. His achievements include 8 NBA championships with the Celtics, 1 Finals MVP, 11 All-NBA Team selection, 13 All-Star Game selections and 8 All-Defensive Team selections. Walker, the 12th pick, won the NBA championship with the Philadelphia 76ers in 1967 and was selected to 7 All-Star Games.

Zelmo Beaty, the 3rd pick, played in both NBA and American Basketball Association (ABA). He was selected to 2 NBA All-Star Games, 3 ABA All-Star Games and 3 All-ABA Teams. Dischinger and 4th pick Len Chappell are the only other players from this draft who have been selected to an All-Star Game. During his stint with the Detroit Pistons, Dischinger served as an interim player-coach for two games in 1971. Wayne Hightower, the 5th pick, had left college after his junior year in 1961. He wasn't eligible to be drafted until his college class had graduated, therefore he spent a year playing in the Spanish League with Real Madrid. In his only season there, he helped Real Madrid to a Spanish League title and to the European Champions Cup final. Reggie Harding, the 29th pick, became the first player drafted out of high school when the Detroit Pistons selected him in the fourth round. However, he did not enter the league until the 1963–64 season due to the rules that prevent a high school player to play in the league until one year after his high school class graduated. He was drafted again in the 1963 draft by the Pistons with the 48th pick in the sixth round.

Kevin Loughery, the 11th pick, had a stint as a player-coach with the Philadelphia 76ers in 1973. At the end of the season, he retired from playing and moved to the ABA to coach the New York Nets. He won 2 ABA championships with the Nets in 1974 and 1976. He then moved to the NBA with the Nets after the ABA–NBA merger. He coached 6 NBA teams, most recently with the Miami Heat. Don Nelson, the 17th pick, played 14 seasons in the NBA, winning 5 NBA championships with the Celtics. He became a head coach soon after retiring as a player in 1976. He coached 4 NBA teams, most recently with the Golden State Warriors. He held the record for most wins as a head coach, surpassing Lenny Wilkens' previous record of 1,332 wins. He won the Coach of the Year Award for a record three times, tied with Pat Riley. He was also named among the Top 10 Coaches in NBA History announced at the league's 50th anniversary in 1996.

== Key ==
Pos.	G	F	C
Position	Guard	Forward	Center

^	Denotes player who has been inducted to the Naismith Memorial Basketball Hall of Fame
^{+}	Denotes player who has been selected for at least one All-Star Game
^{~}	Denotes player who has been selected as Rookie of the Year

== Draft ==
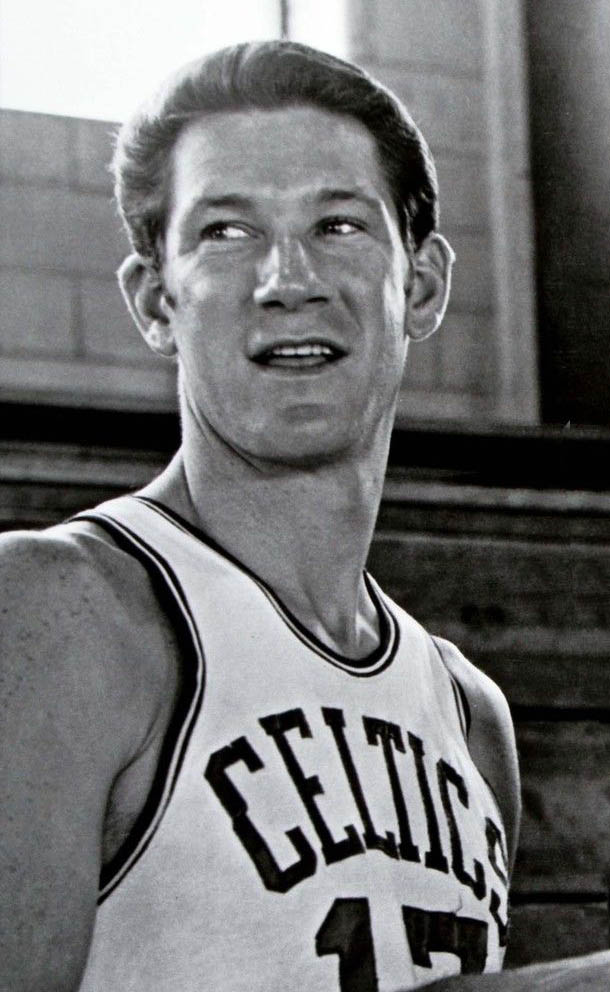
John Havlicek, selected by the Boston Celtics.

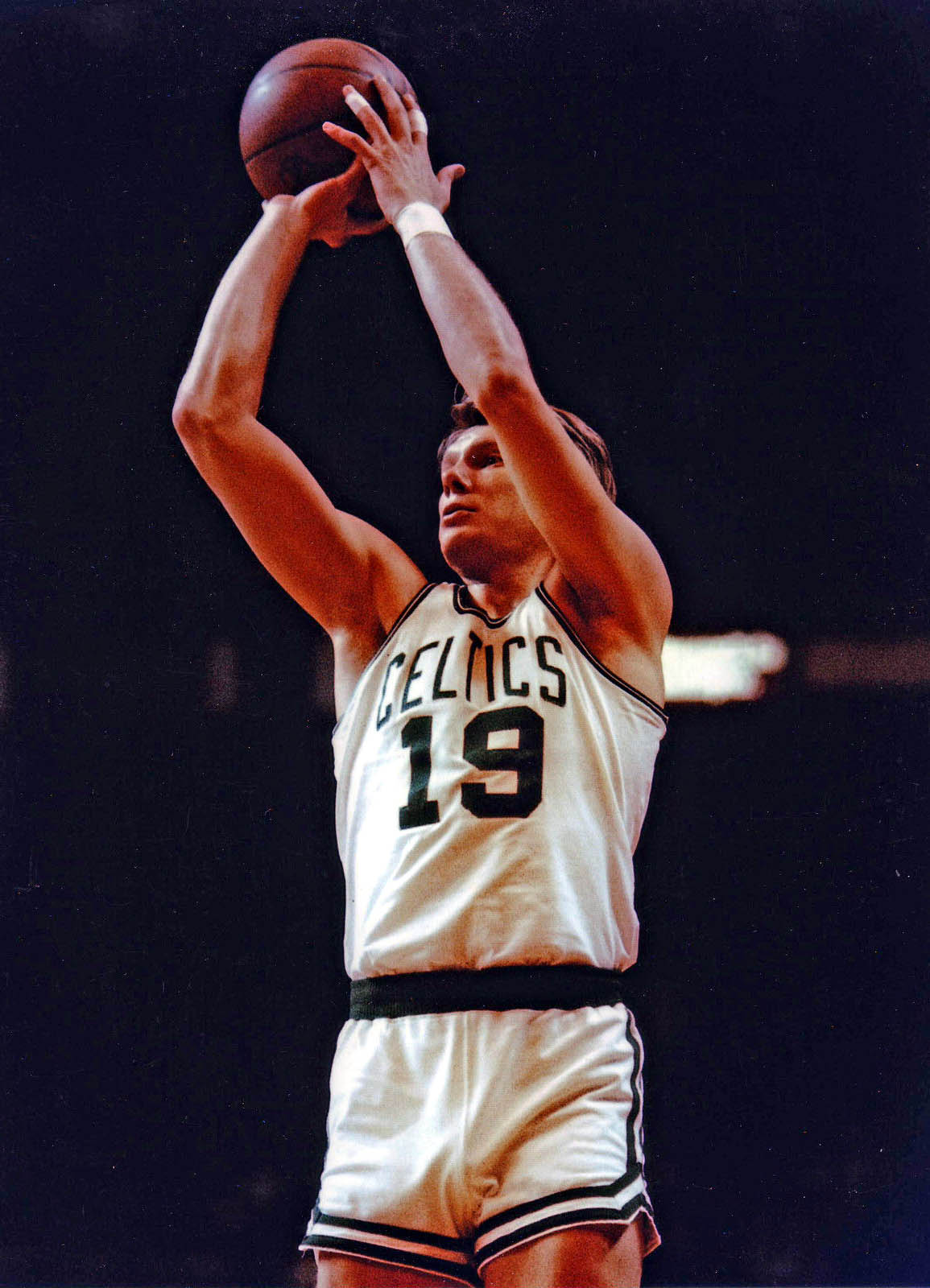
Don Nelson was selected 17th overall by the Chicago Zephyrs.

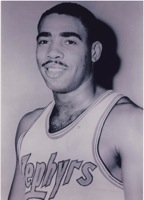
Charles Hardnett was selected 19th overall by the St. Louis Hawks.

Rnd.	Pick	Player	Pos.	Nationality (Note: Nationality indicates the player's national team or representative nationality. If a player has not competed at the international level, then the nationality indicates the national team which the player is eligible to represent according to FIBA rules.)	Team	School / club team
T	–	Dave DeBusschere^	G/F	United States	Detroit Pistons	Detroit (Sr.)
T	–	Jerry Lucas^^{~}	F/C	United States	Cincinnati Royals	Ohio State (Sr.)
1	1	Bill McGill	F/C	United States	Chicago Zephyrs	Utah (Sr.)
1	2	Paul Hogue	C	United States	New York Knicks	Cincinnati (Sr.)
1	3	Zelmo Beaty^	C	United States	St. Louis Hawks	Prairie View A&M (Sr.)
1	4	Len Chappell^{+}	F/C	United States	Syracuse Nationals	Wake Forest (Sr.)
1	5	Wayne Hightower	F/C	United States	Philadelphia Warriors	Real Madrid (Spain)
1	6	LeRoy Ellis	F/C	United States	Los Angeles Lakers	St. John's (Sr.)
1	7	John Havlicek^	G/F	United States	Boston Celtics	Ohio State (Sr.)
2	8	Terry Dischinger^{+}^{~}	G/F	United States	Chicago Zephyrs	Purdue (Sr.)
2	9	John Rudometkin	F	United States	New York Knicks	USC (Sr.)
2	10	Bob Duffy	G	United States	St. Louis Hawks	Colgate (Sr.)
2	11	Kevin Loughery	G	United States	Detroit Pistons	St. John's (Sr.)
2	12	Chet Walker^	G/F	United States	Syracuse Nationals	Bradley (Sr.)
2	13	Bud Olsen	F/C	United States	Cincinnati Royals	Louisville (Sr.)
2	14	Hubie White	G/F	United States	Philadelphia Warriors	Villanova (Sr.)
2	15	Gene Wiley	C	United States	Los Angeles Lakers	Wichita (Sr.)
2	16	Jack Foley	F	United States	Boston Celtics	Holy Cross (Sr.)
3	17	Don Nelson	F	United States	Chicago Zephyrs	Iowa (Sr.)
3	18	Bobby Rascoe^{#}	G	United States	New York Knicks	Western Kentucky (Sr.)
3	19	Charles Hardnett	F/C	United States	St. Louis Hawks	Grambling (Sr.)
3	20	Harold Hudgens^{#}	F	United States	Detroit Pistons	Texas Tech (Sr.)
3	21	Porter Meriwether	G	United States	Syracuse Nationals	Tennessee State (Sr.)
3	22	Chris Appel^{#}	G	United States	Cincinnati Royals	USC (Sr.)
3	23	Dave Fedor	F	United States	Philadelphia Warriors	Florida State (Sr.)
3	24	John Green^{#}	G	United States	Los Angeles Lakers	UCLA (Sr.)
3	25	Jim Hadnot^{#}	C	United States	Boston Celtics	Providence (Sr.)
4	26	Chico Vaughn	G	United States	St. Louis Hawks (from Chicago)	Southern Illinois (Sr.)
4	27	Clifford Luyk^{#}	C	United States	New York Knicks	Florida (Sr.)
4	28	Jerry Grote	G	United States	St. Louis Hawks	Loyola (California) (Sr.)
4	29	Reggie Harding	C	United States	Detroit Pistons	Nashville Christian Institute (Nashville, Tennessee)
4	30	Bob McCully^{#}	F	United States	Syracuse Nationals	St. Bonaventure (Sr.)
4	31	Jack Thobe^{#}	F	United States	Cincinnati Royals	Xavier (Sr.)
4	32	Garry Roggenburk^{#}	F	United States	San Francisco Warriors	Dayton (Sr.)
4	33	Jan Loudermilk^{#}	F	United States	Los Angeles Lakers	SMU (Sr.)
4	34	Roger Strickland	F	United States	Boston Celtics	Jacksonville (Jr.)
5	35	Cornell Green^{#}	G	United States	Chicago Zephyrs	Utah State (Sr.)
5	36	Bob Burgess^{#}	F	United States	New York Knicks	Marshall (Sr.)
5	37	Tom Hatton^{#}	G	United States	St. Louis Hawks	Dayton (Sr.)
5	38	Lindberg Moody^{#}	G	United States	Detroit Pistons	South Carolina State (Sr.)
5	39	John Windsor	F	United States	Syracuse Nationals	Stanford (Sr.)
5	40	Mike Wroblewski^{#}	F	United States	Cincinnati Royals	Kansas State (Sr.)
5	41	Jackie Jackson^{#}	F	United States	San Francisco Warriors	Trenton Colonials (EPBL)
5	42	Art Whisnant^{#}	F	United States	Los Angeles Lakers	South Carolina (Sr.)
5	43	Gary Daniels^{#}	F	United States	Boston Celtics	The Citadel (Sr.)
6	44	Bill Hanson^{#}	C	United States	Chicago Zephyrs	Washington (Sr.)
6	45	Ken Stanley^{#}	G	United States	New York Knicks	Pacific (Sr.)
6	46	Jay Carty	G	United States	St. Louis Hawks	Oregon State (Sr.)
6	47	Ed Noe^{#}	F	United States	Detroit Pistons	Morehead State (Sr.)
6	48	Lanny Van Eman^{#}	G	United States	Syracuse Nationals	Wichita State (Sr.)
6	49	Jerry Foster^{#}	G	United States	Cincinnati Royals	Drake (Sr.)
6	50	Jim Hudock^{#}	F	United States	San Francisco Warriors	North Carolina (Sr.)
6	51	Bucky Keller^{#}	G	United States	Los Angeles Lakers	Virginia Tech (Sr.)
6	52	Jim Hooley^{#}	F	United States	Boston Celtics	Boston College (Sr.)
7	53	Jack Ardon^{#}	C	United States	Chicago Zephyrs	Tulane (Sr.)
7	54	Richie Swartz^{#}	G	United States	New York Knicks	Hofstra (Sr.)
7	55	Bob McAteer^{#}	G	United States	St. Louis Hawks	La Salle (Sr.)
7	56	John Bradley^{#}	G	United States	Detroit Pistons	Lawrence Tech (Sr.)
7	57	Bob Sharpenter^{#}	C	United States	Syracuse Nationals	Georgetown (Sr.)
7	58	Gary Cunningham^{#}	F	United States	Cincinnati Royals	UCLA (Sr.)
7	59	Howie Montgomery	F	United States	Philadelphia Warriors	Pan American (Sr.)
7	60	Clyde Arnold^{#}	F	United States	Boston Celtics	Duquesne (Sr.)
8	61	Larry Pursiful^{#}	G	United States	Chicago Zephyrs	Kentucky (Sr.)
8	62	Warren Fouts^{#}	F	United States	New York Knicks	Oklahoma (Sr.)
8	63	Terry Ball^{#}	G	United States	St. Louis Hawks	Washington State (Sr.)
8	64	Mike Rice^{#}	G	United States	Detroit Pistons	Duquesne (Sr.)
8	65	Jerry Harkness	G	United States	Syracuse Nationals	Loyola (Illinois) (Jr.)
8	66	Ed Bento^{#}	F	United States	Cincinnati Royals	Loyola (California) (Sr.)
8	67	Bill Kirvin^{#}	G	United States	San Francisco Warriors	Xavier (Sr.)
8	68	Bill Garner^{#}	C	United States	Los Angeles Lakers	Portland (Sr.)
8	69	Chuck Chevalier^{#}	G	United States	Boston Celtics	Boston College (Sr.)
9	70	Carroll Broussard^{#}	F	United States	Chicago Zephyrs	Texas A&M (Sr.)
9	71	Paul Benec^{#}	F	United States	New York Knicks	Duquesne (Sr.)
9	72	Marvin Trotman^{#}	G	United States	St. Louis Hawks	Elizabeth City State (Sr.)
9	73	Bill Nelson^{#}	G	United States	Detroit Pistons	Hamline (Sr.)
9	74	Vince Brewer^{#}	G	United States	Syracuse Nationals	Iowa State (Sr.)
9	75	Chris Jones^{#}	G	United States	Cincinnati Royals	Carson–Newman (Sr.)
9	76	Tom Kieffer^{#}	G	United States	San Francisco Warriors	Saint Louis (Sr.)
9	77	Bill Mattson^{#}	F	United States	Los Angeles Lakers	Minnesota Duluth (Sr.)
9	78	Mike Cingiser^{#}	G	United States	Boston Celtics	Brown (Sr.)
10	79	Pete Campbell^{#}	G	United States	Chicago Zephyrs	Princeton (Sr.)
10	80	Ralph Richardson^{#}	F	United States	New York Knicks	Eastern Kentucky (Sr.)
10	81	Charlie Sells^{#}	F	United States	St. Louis Hawks	Washington State (Sr.)
10	82	Glenn Moore^{#}	F	United States	Detroit Pistons	Oregon (Jr.)
10	83	George Knighton^{#}	F	United States	Cincinnati Royals	New Mexico State (Sr.)
10	84	Ken McComb^{#}	F	United States	San Francisco Warriors	North Carolina (Sr.)
11	85	Jeff Slade	F	United States	Chicago Zephyrs	Kenyon (Sr.)
11	86	Edward Mazria^{#}	F	United States	New York Knicks	Pratt (Sr.)
11	87	Skip Chappelle^{#}	G	United States	St. Louis Hawks	Maine (Sr.)
11	88	Frank Pinchback^{#}	F	United States	Cincinnati Royals	Xavier (Sr.)
11	89	Donnie Walsh^{#}	G	United States	San Francisco Warriors	North Carolina (Sr.)
12	90	Mel Nowell	G	United States	Chicago Zephyrs	Ohio State (Sr.)
12	91	John Caveny^{#}	G	United States	St. Louis Hawks	Le Moyne (Sr.)
12	92	Charles Warren^{#}	G	United States	San Francisco Warriors	Oregon (Sr.)
13	93	Tom Kennedy^{#}	F	United States	Chicago Zephyrs	Lewis (Sr.)
13	94	Jerry Carlton^{#}	G	United States	St. Louis Hawks	Arkansas (Sr.)
14	95	Bob Mahland^{#}	G	United States	Chicago Zephyrs	Williams (Sr.)
14	96	Wilky Gilmore^{#}	F	United States	St. Louis Hawks	Colorado (Sr.)
15	97	Pat McKenzie^{#}	F	United States	Chicago Zephyrs	Kansas State (Sr.)
15	98	Dave Ricereto^{#}	G	United States	St. Louis Hawks	Rhode Island (Sr.)
16	99	Norman Majors^{#}	F	United States	Chicago Zephyrs	Rockhurst (Sr.)
16	100	Rally Rounsaville^{#}	G	United States	St. Louis Hawks	Cal Poly (Sr.)

== Notable undrafted players ==
These players were not selected in the 1962 draft but played at least one game in the NBA.

Player	Pos.	Nationality	School/club team
Dan Tieman	G	United States	Thomas More
Ralph Wells	G	United States	Northwestern

== Notes ==
1: Reggie Harding played and graduated from Detroit Eastern High School in January but he played high school basketball in Nashville, Tennessee, prior to the draft.

== See also ==
- List of first overall NBA draft picks
