= Carroll Broussard =

American basketball player

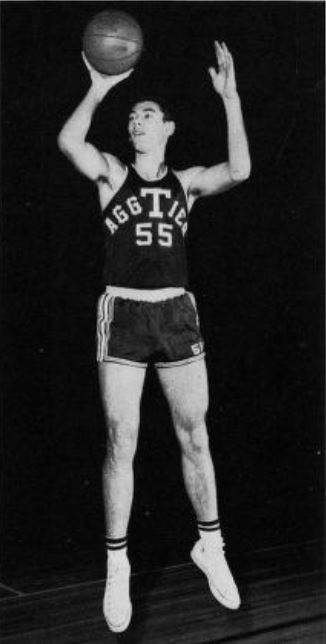
- Broussard during his junior year at Texas A&M

Personal information
- Born: September 18, 1940 (age 86)
- Listed height: 6 ft 5 in (1.96 m)
- Listed weight: 180 lb (82 kg)

Career information
- High school: Thomas Jefferson (Port Arthur, Texas)
- College: Texas A&M (1958–1962)
- NBA draft: 1962: 9th round, 74th overall pick
- Drafted by: Chicago Zephyrs
- Position: Forward

Career highlights
- 2× SWC Player of the Year (1961, 1962); 3× AP honorable mention All-American (1960–1962); 3× First-team All-SWC (1960–1962)
- Stats at Basketball Reference

Carroll J. Broussard (born September 18, 1940) is an American former basketball player known for his college career at Texas A&M University between 1958 and 1962. Broussard was a two-time Southwest Conference Player of the Year, three-time first-team all-SWC selection, three-time All-American, and was later honored as one of the Southeastern Conference's Legends of Basketball.

A native of Port Arthur, Texas, Broussard began to get noticed as a junior at Thomas Jefferson High School in his hometown. He led his school to win the Texas 4A state championship; the following season as a senior, he led them to be runners-up. Broussard enrolled at Texas A&M in the fall of 1958. When he became eligible in 1959–60, Broussard made an immediate impact. He averaged 17.9 points and 7.3 rebounds per game while leading the Aggies to a 19–5 overall record. The following year, Broussard averaged 22.4 points and 9.1 rebounds per game while leading Texas A&M to a 16–8 record. His scoring average is still the fifth-highest single season average in Texas A&M history. On January 16, 1961, he set still-standing school single game records for free throws made (19) and attempted (22, since tied) while playing against the Texas Longhorns. In his senior season in 1961–62, Broussard averaged 17.3 points and 8.5 rebounds per game. The Aggies finished with a 15–9 record.

Despite his prolific college career, Texas A&M never qualified for a postseason tournament. In none of Broussard's three varsity seasons did they finish worse than second place in the conference standings. His 1,382 career points and 596 career rebounds are still high in the Texas A&M record books, as is his total free throws made (396, fourth most). After his college career ended, Broussard was selected in the 1962 NBA draft by the Chicago Zephyrs in the ninth round, although he never played professional basketball.

In 2016, the Southeastern Conference selected him as one of their Legends of Basketball (the SEC recognizes much of the Southwest Conference's athletics history since most of the schools that were in the SWC eventually left for the SEC, thus disbanding the SWC in 1996).
