= Ralph Wells =

American basketball player (1940–1968)

Personal information
- Born: September 3, 1940 Chicago, Illinois, U.S.
- Died: August 2, 1968 (aged 27) Chicago, Illinois, U.S.
- Listed height: 6 ft 1 in (1.85 m)
- Listed weight: 180 lb (82 kg)

Career information
- High school: Marshall (Chicago, Illinois)
- College: Northwestern (1959–1962)
- NBA draft: 1962: undrafted
- Position: Guard
- Number: 23

Career history
- 1962: Chicago Zephyrs
- 1962: Pittsburgh Rens

Career highlights
- Second-team All-Big Ten (1961); Third-team All-Big Ten (1962)
- Stats at NBA.com
- Stats at Basketball Reference

Ralph E. Wells (September 3, 1940 – August 2, 1968) was an American professional basketball player. He played for the Chicago Zephyrs in the National Basketball Association (NBA) for three games during 1962–63 after a collegiate career at Northwestern University. He shot 0-for-7 in free throw attempts in his NBA career.

Wells also played for the Pittsburgh Rens in the American Basketball League before the league folded in December 1962. On August 1, 1968, Wells drowned.

== Career statistics ==
Legend
GP	Games played	GS	Games started	MPG	Minutes per game
FG%	Field goal percentage	3P%	3-point field goal percentage	FT%	Free throw percentage
RPG	Rebounds per game	APG	Assists per game	SPG	Steals per game
BPG	Blocks per game	PPG	Points per game	**Bold**	Career high

=== NBA ===
==== Regular season ====
Year	Team	GP	MPG	FG%	FT%	RPG	APG	PPG
1962–63	Chicago	3	16.0	.143	.000	2.0	2.3	.7
