= Bill Hanson (basketball) =

American basketball player (1940–2018)

Personal information
- Born: June 4, 1940 Bellingham, Washington, U.S.
- Died: January 25, 2018 (aged 77) Bellevue, Washington, U.S.

Career information
- High school: Blaine (Blaine, Washington); Mercer Island (Mercer Island, Washington)
- College: Washington (1959–1962)
- NBA draft: 1962: 6th round, 46th overall pick
- Drafted by: Chicago Zephyrs
- Playing career: 1963–1964
- Position: Center

Career history
- 1963–1964: Real Madrid Baloncesto

Career highlights
- FIBA European Champions Cup champion (1964); 3× First-team All-AAWU (1960–1962)
- Stats at Basketball Reference

William Lawrence Hanson (June 4, 1940 – January 25, 2018) was an American professional basketball player. He played one season in Spain with Real Madrid Baloncesto when they won the 1963–64 FIBA European Champions Cup. Hanson played college basketball with the Washington Huskies from 1960 to 1962, when the center was a three-time all-conference selection in the Athletic Association of Western Universities (AAWU).

Hanson started playing high school basketball in Washington at Blaine High School before moving to Mercer Island High School for his senior year. He was nationally recruited by universities to play basketball, a rarity at the time for a player in the Northwest. He decided to attend University of Washington, whose basketball coach, Tippy Dye, had helped make center Bob Houbregs an All-American. In 1962, Hanson became the first Husky to lead the conference in rebounding. On January 12, 1962, he scored 37 points and led the team to an 85–67 upset of No. 4 USC; he became just the third player in school history to reach 30 points in a game. He averaged 20.8 points per game during his college career, and left Washington second in scoring in school history behind Houbregs (25.6).

Hanson was selected by the Chicago Zephyrs, a National Basketball Association (NBA) expansion team, in the sixth round of the 1962 NBA draft, the 46th player taken. He declined to sign with Chicago, as his wife was still in school and the Zephyrs offered just a $6,000 contract. He played one season in Spain before attending business school and working in New York City and California.

Hanson is twice divorced, and has four daughters including twins, (3) grandchildren and (1) great-grandchild. He died at age 77 in his home in Bellevue, Washington on January 25, 2018.
