= Jeff Slade =

American basketball player (1941–2012)

Personal information
- Born: March 1, 1941 Chicago Heights, Illinois, U.S.
- Died: February 11, 2012 (aged 70) Sylvania, Ohio, U.S.
- Listed height: 6 ft 6 in (1.98 m)
- Listed weight: 220 lb (100 kg)

Career information
- High school: Bloom Township (Chicago Heights, Illinois)
- College: Kenyon (1958–1962)
- NBA draft: 1962: 11th round, 85th overall pick
- Drafted by: Chicago Zephyrs
- Position: Forward
- Number: 34

Career history
- 1962: Chicago Zephyrs

Career highlights
- OAC Player of the Year (1962); 4× All-OAC (1959–1962)
- Stats at NBA.com
- Stats at Basketball Reference

Jeffrey Alan Slade (March 1, 1941 – February 11, 2012) was an American professional basketball player. He played in three games for the Chicago Zephyrs of the NBA in the beginning of the 1962–63 season after being selected by them in the 1962 NBA draft. He scored four total points in his career.

== Career statistics ==
Legend
GP	Games played	GS	Games started	MPG	Minutes per game
FG%	Field goal percentage	3P%	3-point field goal percentage	FT%	Free throw percentage
RPG	Rebounds per game	APG	Assists per game	SPG	Steals per game
BPG	Blocks per game	PPG	Points per game	**Bold**	Career high

=== NBA ===
==== Regular season ====
Year	Team	GP	MPG	FG%	FT%	RPG	APG	PPG
1962–63	Chicago	3	6.7	.400	.000	2.3	.0	1.3
