= Steve Lingenfelter =

American basketball player (born 1958)

Personal information
- Born: June 10, 1958 (age 68) Eau Claire, Wisconsin, U.S.
- Listed height: 6 ft 9 in (2.06 m)
- Listed weight: 225 lb (102 kg)

Career information
- High school: Bloomington Jefferson (Bloomington, Minnesota)
- College: Minnesota (1976–1978); South Dakota State (1979–1981)
- NBA draft: 1981: 2nd round, 44th overall pick
- Drafted by: Washington Bullets
- Playing career: 1981–1990
- Position: Power forward
- Number: 50, 25

Career history
- 1981–1982: Tropic Udine
- 1982: Washington Bullets
- 1983–1984: Wisconsin Flyers
- 1984: San Antonio Spurs
- 1985–1988: Pepper / Cuki Mestre
- 1989: Irge Desio
- 1989–1990: Pau-Orthez

Career highlights
- CBA Newcomer of the Year (1984); First-team All-NCC (1980)
- Stats at NBA.com
- Stats at Basketball Reference

Steven Rodney Lingenfelter (born June 10, 1958) is an American former professional basketball player. A 6'9" power forward, he played collegiately at for the Minnesota Golden Gophers before transferring to South Dakota State University.

Lingenfelter played two seasons (1982–84) in the National Basketball Association (NBA) as a member of the Washington Bullets and San Antonio Spurs. He averaged 1.0 points per game and 1.6 rebounds per game in his NBA career.

== Career statistics ==
Legend
GP	Games played	GS	Games started	MPG	Minutes per game
FG%	Field goal percentage	3P%	3-point field goal percentage	FT%	Free throw percentage
RPG	Rebounds per game	APG	Assists per game	SPG	Steals per game
BPG	Blocks per game	PPG	Points per game	**Bold**	Career high

=== NBA ===
==== Regular season ====
Year	Team	GP	GS	MPG	FG%	3P%	FT%	RPG	APG	SPG	BPG	PPG
1982–83	Washington	**7**	0	**7.6**	.667	–	.000	**1.7**	**.6**	**.1**	**.4**	**1.1**
1983–84	San Antonio	3	0	4.7	**1.000**	–	.000	1.3	.3	.0	.0	.7
Career		10	0	6.7	.714	–	.000	1.6	.5	.1	.3	1.0
