= Roland West (basketball) =

American basketball player

Personal information
- Born: June 6, 1944 (age 82) Cincinnati, Ohio, U.S.
- Listed height: 6 ft 4 in (1.93 m)
- Listed weight: 178 lb (81 kg)

Career information
- High school: Withrow (Cincinnati, Ohio)
- College: Cincinnati (1964–1967)
- NBA draft: 1967: 20th round, 162nd overall pick
- Drafted by: Baltimore Bullets
- Playing career: 1967–1968
- Position: Guard
- Number: 15

Career history
- 1967–1968: Baltimore Bullets

Career highlights
- First-team All-MVC (1966)
- Stats at NBA.com
- Stats at Basketball Reference

Roland Dee West (born June 6, 1944) is an American former National Basketball Association (NBA) player for the Baltimore Bullets.

West attended Withrow High School in Cincinnati and played college basketball for the Cincinnati Bearcats.

West lettered from 1964–65 to 1966–67 for the Bearcats. As a sophomore starting forward in 1964–65, he averaged 11.0 points and 4.7 rebounds while leading the team in assists (2.6) and blocks (1.3) as the Bearcats went 14–12.

In his junior season of 1965–66, West helped UC to a 21–7 record, the 1966 Missouri Valley Conference championship while averaging 15.5 points and a team-high 9.4 rebounds.

West received a bachelor's degree in education from the University of Cincinnati.

West was drafted with the first pick in the 20th round of the 1967 NBA draft.

He played in four games for the Bullets in the 1967–68 NBA season and recorded a total of four points and five rebounds.

West is president and chief executive officer of Roland D. West & Associates Inc., a business consulting firm in Cincinnati. He is a former chair of the Greater Cincinnati area United Negro College Fund campaign. He and his wife, Yvonne, are longtime supporters of UNCF and its mission.

In 2013, West was inducted into the Greater Cincinnati Basketball Hall of Fame.

== Career statistics ==
Legend
GP	Games played	GS	Games started	MPG	Minutes per game
FG%	Field goal percentage	3P%	3-point field goal percentage	FT%	Free throw percentage
RPG	Rebounds per game	APG	Assists per game	SPG	Steals per game
BPG	Blocks per game	PPG	Points per game	**Bold**	Career high

=== NBA ===
==== Regular season ====
Year	Team	GP	MPG	FG%	FT%	RPG	APG	PPG
1967–68	Baltimore	4	3.5	.400	–	1.3	.0	1.0
