= Thales McReynolds =

American basketball player (1943–1988)

Personal information
- Born: June 8, 1943 Birmingham, Alabama
- Died: July 3, 1988 (aged 45)
- Listed height: 6 ft 3 in (1.91 m)
- Listed weight: 185 lb (84 kg)

Career information
- College: Miles (1962–1965)
- NBA draft: 1965: 11th round, 82nd overall pick
- Drafted by: Baltimore Bullets
- Playing career: 1965–1966
- Position: Guard
- Number: 11

Career history
- 1965: Baltimore Bullets
- Stats at NBA.com
- Stats at Basketball Reference

Thales Alford McReynolds (June 8, 1943 – July 3, 1988) was an American professional basketball player. He played in the National Basketball Association (NBA) for the Baltimore Bullets after he was selected as the 82nd pick of the 1965 NBA draft. McReynolds played five games for the Bullets during the 1965–66 NBA season and averaged .6 points per game, 1.2 rebounds per game and .2 assists per game.

== Career statistics ==
Legend
GP	Games played	GS	Games started	MPG	Minutes per game
FG%	Field goal percentage	3P%	3-point field goal percentage	FT%	Free throw percentage
RPG	Rebounds per game	APG	Assists per game	SPG	Steals per game
BPG	Blocks per game	PPG	Points per game	**Bold**	Career high

=== NBA ===
==== Regular season ====
Year	Team	GP	MPG	FG%	FT%	RPG	APG	PPG
1965–66	Baltimore	5	5.6	.083	.500	1.2	.2	.6
