= San Antonio Spurs all-time roster =

The following is a list of players, both past and current, who appeared at least in one game for the San Antonio Spurs National Basketball Association and American Basketball Association franchise.

== Players ==
Note: Statistics are correct through the end of the 2025–26 season.

G	Guard	G/F	Guard-forward	F	Forward	F/C	Forward-center	C	Center

legend
^	Denotes player who has been inducted to the Naismith Memorial Basketball Hall of Fame
*	Denotes player who has been selected for at least one All-Star Game with the San Antonio Spurs and is currently on the team roster
^{+}	Denotes player who has been selected for at least one All-Star Game with the San Antonio Spurs
^{x}	Denotes player who is currently on the San Antonio Spurs roster
0.0	Denotes the San Antonio Spurs statistics leader (min. 100 games played for the team for per-game statistics)
player	Denotes player who has played for the San Antonio Spurs in the ABA

=== A to B ===
All-time roster
Player	Pos.	Pre-draft team	Yrs	Seasons	Statistics									Ref.
Player	Pos.	Pre-draft team	Yrs	Seasons	GP	MP	REB	AST	PTS	MPG	RPG	APG	PPG	Ref.
Blake Ahearn	G	Missouri State	1	2008–2009	3	19	1	2	8	6.3	0.3	0.7	2.7	
LaMarcus Aldridge^{+}	F/C	Texas	6	2015–2021	376	12,090	3,020	760	7,325	32.2	8.0	2.0	19.5	
Cory Alexander	G	Virginia	3	1995–1998	177	2,515	212	446	910	14.2	1.2	2.5	5.1	
Cadillac Anderson	F/C	Houston	4	1987–1989; 1995–1997	292	6,388	1,737	184	2,460	21.9	5.9	0.6	8.4	
Derek Anderson	G	Kentucky	1	2000–2001	82	2,859	363	301	1,269	34.9	4.4	3.7	15.5	
James Anderson	G/F	Oklahoma State	3	2010–2013	87	983	116	68	318	11.3	1.3	0.8	3.7	
Kyle Anderson	G/F	UCLA	4	2014–2018	257	4,601	920	444	1,255	17.9	3.6	1.7	4.9	
Michael Anderson	G	Drexel	1	1988–1989	36	730	89	153	204	20.3	2.5	4.3	5.7	
Willie Anderson	G/F	Georgia	7	1988–1995	451	13,611	1,794	1,874	5,946	30.2	4.0	4.2	13.2	
Joel Anthony	C	UNLV	1	2016–2017	19	122	31	3	25	6.4	1.6	0.2	1.3	
Bird Averitt	G	Pepperdine	1	1973–1974	74	1,639	121	132	851	22.1	1.6	1.8	11.5	
Jeff Ayres	F	Arizona State	2	2013–2015	124	1,335	375	74	377	10.8	3.0	0.6	3.0	
Gene Banks	G/F	Duke	4	1981–1985	323	9,113	2,050	914	3,800	28.2	6.3	2.8	11.8	
Stephen Bardo	G	Illinois	1	1991–1992	1	1	1	0	0	1.0	1.0	0.0	0.0	
Dominick Barlow	F	Dumont HS (NJ)	2	2022–2024	61	828	215	60	254	13.6	3.5	1.0	4.2	
Harrison Barnes^{x}	F	North Carolina	2	2024–2026	159	4,216	523	284	1,776	26.5	3.3	1.8	11.2	
Brent Barry	G	Oregon State	4	2004–2008	261	5,186	564	493	1,888	19.9	2.2	1.9	7.2	
Tim Bassett	F/C	Georgia	1	1979–1980	5	72	15	10	10	14.4	3.0	2.0	2.0	
Charles Bassey	C	Western Kentucky	3	2022–2025	90	1,089	421	86	419	12.1	4.7	1.0	4.7	
Mengke Bateer	C	(China) Beijing Ducks	1	2002–2003	12	46	10	4	9	3.8	0.8	0.3	0.8	
Keita Bates-Diop	F	Ohio State	3	2020–2023	156	2,654	528	156	1,061	17.0	3.4	1.0	6.8	
Dave Batton	C	Notre Dame	1	1983–1984	4	31	4	3	10	7.8	1.0	0.8	2.5	
Aron Baynes	C	Washington State	3	2012–2015	139	1,754	495	74	665	12.6	3.6	0.5	4.8	
Charlie Beasley	G/F	SMU	4	1967–1971	276	7,324	703	858	2,622	26.5	2.5	3.1	9.5	
John Beasley^{+}	F/C	Texas A&M	5	1967–1972	334	11,915	3,673	514	5,983	35.7	11.0	1.5	17.9	
Art Becker	F	Arizona State	1	1972–1973	6	50	12	0	20	8.3	2.0	0.0	3.3	
Bob Bedell	F	Stanford	3	1968–1971	193	2,985	880	241	1,465	15.5	4.6	1.2	7.6	
William Bedford	C	Memphis	1	1992–1993	16	66	10	0	25	4.1	0.6	0.0	1.6	
Marco Belinelli	G/F	(Italy) Fortitudo Bologna	4	2013–2015; 2018–2020	278	6,102	680	474	2,669	21.9	2.4	1.7	9.6	
Spider Bennett	G	Winston-Salem State	1	1968–1969	46	823	114	69	352	17.9	2.5	1.5	7.7	
Walter Berry	F	St. John's	2	1986–1988	129	3,489	697	214	2,260	27.0	5.4	1.7	17.5	
Dāvis Bertāns	F	(Slovenia) Olimpija	3	2016–2019	220	3,526	515	220	1,365	16.0	2.3	1.0	6.2	
Bismack Biyombo^{x}	C	(France) Baloncesto Fuenlabrada	2	2024–2026	53	669	184	36	167	12.6	3.5	0.7	3.2	
Uwe Blab	C	Indiana	1	1989–1990	7	50	9	1	15	7.1	1.3	0.1	2.1	
Nate Blackwell	G	Temple	1	1987–1988	10	112	6	18	37	11.2	0.6	1.8	3.7	
DeJuan Blair	F/C	Pittsburgh	4	2009–2013	288	5,442	1,672	265	2,251	18.9	5.8	0.9	7.8	
Keith Bogans	G/F	Kentucky	1	2009–2010	79	1,559	176	95	347	19.7	2.2	1.2	4.4	
Matt Bonner	F	Florida	10	2006–2016	632	10,093	1,802	448	3,460	16.0	2.9	0.7	5.5	
Ron Boone	G/F	Idaho State	3	1968–1971	204	6,335	1,071	693	3,495	31.1	5.3	3.4	17.1	
Jamaree Bouyea	G	San Francisco	1	2023–2024	3	38	9	3	11	12.7	3.0	1.0	3.7	
Bruce Bowen (#12)	F	Cal State Fullerton	8	2001–2009	630	18,689	1,861	814	4,061	29.7	3.0	1.3	6.4	
Anthony Bowie	G/F	Oklahoma	1	1988–1989	18	438	56	29	155	24.3	3.1	1.6	8.6	
Gary Bradds	F	Ohio State	1	1970–1971	19	207	63	12	99	10.9	3.3	0.6	5.2	
Malaki Branham	G	Ohio State	3	2022–2025	188	3,571	380	321	1,598	19.0	2.0	1.7	8.5	
Mike Bratz	G	Stanford	1	1981–1982	81	1,616	166	438	625	20.0	2.0	5.4	7.7	
Ron Brewer	G	Arkansas	4	1980–1982; 1983–1985	120	2,362	156	210	1,250	19.7	1.3	1.8	10.4	
Frank Brickowski	F/C	Penn State	4	1986–1990	219	5,570	1,235	507	2,541	25.4	5.6	2.3	11.6	
Allan Bristow	G/F	Virginia Tech	4	1975–1979	285	5,704	1,026	786	2,402	20.0	3.6	2.8	8.4	
Mike Brittain	C	South Carolina	2	1985–1987	38	248	53	7	63	6.5	1.4	0.2	1.7	
Chucky Brown	F	NC State	1	1999–2000	30	602	77	41	190	20.1	2.6	1.4	6.3	
Devin Brown	G	UTSA	3	2002–2005	132	1,887	313	127	740	14.3	2.4	1.0	5.6	
Roger Brown	C	Kansas	1	1973–1974	2	26	6	1	10	13.0	3.0	0.5	5.0	
Shannon Brown	G	Michigan State	1	2013–2014	10	103	13	5	23	10.3	1.3	0.5	2.3	
Carter Bryant^{x}	F	Arizona	1	2025–2026	71	818	178	47	298	11.5	2.5	0.7	4.2	
Mark Bryant	F	Seton Hall	1	2001–2002	30	206	44	10	56	6.9	1.5	0.3	1.9	
Jud Buechler	F	Arizona	1	1991–1992	11	140	22	11	33	12.7	2.0	1.0	3.0	
Larry Bunce	C	Utah State	1	1968–1969	24	423	127	15	155	17.6	5.3	0.6	6.5	
Jim Burns	G	Northwestern	1	1967–1968	33	392	60	24	155	11.9	1.8	0.7	4.7	
Willie Burton	G/F	Minnesota	1	1997–1998	13	43	9	1	27	3.3	0.7	0.1	2.1	
Jackie Butler	F/C	Coastal Christian Academy (VA)	1	2006–2007	11	103	22	5	41	9.4	2.0	0.5	3.7	
Rasual Butler	G/F	La Salle	1	2015–2016	46	432	56	24	124	9.4	1.2	0.5	2.7	
Derrick Byars	F	Vanderbilt	1	2011–2012	2	37	11	1	10	18.5	5.5	0.5	5.0	

=== C ===
All-time roster
Player	Pos.	Pre-draft team	Yrs	Seasons	Statistics									Ref.
Player	Pos.	Pre-draft team	Yrs	Seasons	GP	MP	REB	AST	PTS	MPG	RPG	APG	PPG	Ref.
Devontae Cacok	F	UNC Wilmington	1	2021–2022	15	121	42	6	46	8.1	2.8	0.4	3.1	
Mack Calvin	G	USC	1	1976–1977	35	606	31	104	309	17.3	0.9	3.0	8.8	
Antoine Carr	F/C	Wichita State	3	1991–1994	186	4,279	785	175	2,011	23.0	4.2	0.9	10.8	
DeMarre Carroll	F	Missouri	1	2019–2020	15	135	31	11	33	9.0	2.1	0.7	2.2	
Matt Carroll	G	Notre Dame	1	2003–2004	3	22	3	1	6	7.3	1.0	0.3	2.0	
Anthony Carter	G	Hawaii	1	2003–2004	5	87	11	12	22	17.4	2.2	2.4	4.4	
Stephon Castle^{x}	G	UConn	2	2024–2026	149	4,200	659	834	2,323	28.2	4.4	5.6	15.6	
Jerry Chambers	F	Utah	1	1973–1974	38	579	103	42	224	15.2	2.7	1.1	5.9	
Julian Champagnie^{x}	F	St. John's	4	2022–2026	253	5,979	1,057	351	2,395	23.6	4.2	1.4	9.5	
Len Chappell	F/C	Wake Forest	1	1971–1972	79	1,403	318	69	606	17.8	4.0	0.9	7.7	
Maurice Cheeks^	G	West Texas A&M	1	1989–1990	50	1,766	167	302	545	35.3	3.3	6.0	10.9	
Bob Christian	C	Grambling State	1	1969–1970	1	7	1	0	0	7.0	1.0	0.0	0.0	
Sidy Cissoko^{x}	F	NBA G League Ignite	2	2023–2025	29	195	32	16	67	6.7	1.1	0.6	2.3	
Speedy Claxton	G	Hofstra	1	2002–2003	30	471	56	75	173	15.7	1.9	2.5	5.8	
Zach Collins	C	Gonzaga	4	2021–2025	196	3,894	1,026	487	1,892	19.9	5.2	2.5	9.7	
Glen Combs^{+}	G	Virginia Tech	3	1968–1971	198	7,106	616	695	3,839	35.9	3.1	3.5	19.4	
Dallas Comegys	F	DePaul	1	1988–1989	67	1,119	234	30	438	16.7	3.5	0.4	6.5	
Jeff Congdon	G	BYU	1	1971–1972	20	261	26	36	80	13.1	1.3	1.8	4.0	
Darwin Cook	G	Portland	1	1988–1989	36	757	59	84	346	21.0	1.6	2.3	9.6	
Jeff Cook	F/C	Idaho State	2	1984–1986	88	1,204	291	60	296	13.7	3.3	0.7	3.4	
Tom Copa	C	Marquette	1	1991–1992	33	132	36	3	48	4.0	1.1	0.1	1.5	
Tyrone Corbin	G/F	DePaul	2	1985–1987	47	906	144	91	339	19.3	3.1	1.9	7.2	
Dave Corzine	C	DePaul	2	1980–1982	164	4,149	1,265	247	1,689	25.3	7.7	1.5	10.3	
Matt Costello	F	Michigan State	1	2017–2018	4	32	9	2	4	8.0	2.3	0.5	1.0	
Joe Courtney	F	Southern Miss	1	1996–1997	5	48	7	0	13	9.6	1.4	0.0	2.6	
Bobby Croft	C	Tennessee	1	1970–1971	29	517	141	26	230	17.8	4.9	0.9	7.9	
Geoff Crompton	C	North Carolina	1	1982–1983	14	148	48	7	31	10.6	3.4	0.5	2.2	
Austin Croshere	F	Providence	1	2008–2009	3	23	10	3	4	7.7	3.3	1.0	1.3	
Corey Crowder	G/F	Kentucky Wesleyan	1	1994–1995	7	29	3	1	6	4.1	0.4	0.1	0.9	
Terry Cummings	F	DePaul	6	1989–1995	361	9,647	2,523	591	5,181	26.7	7.0	1.6	14.4	
Dante Cunningham	F	Villanova	1	2018–2019	64	928	188	50	194	14.5	2.9	0.8	3.0	

=== D ===
All-time roster
Player	Pos.	Pre-draft team	Yrs	Seasons	Statistics									Ref.
Player	Pos.	Pre-draft team	Yrs	Seasons	GP	MP	REB	AST	PTS	MPG	RPG	APG	PPG	Ref.
Mike D'Antoni	G	Marshall	1	1976–1977	2	9	2	2	3	4.5	1.0	1.0	1.5	
Mike Dabich	C	New Mexico State	1	1967–1968	3	23	7	1	10	7.7	2.3	0.3	3.3	
Louie Dampier^	G	Kentucky	3	1976–1979	232	4,431	261	643	1,553	19.1	1.1	2.8	6.7	
Antonio Daniels	G	Bowling Green	4	1998–2002	276	6,044	479	815	2,138	21.9	1.7	3.0	7.7	
Lloyd Daniels	G	Mt. SAC	2	1992–1994	142	2,553	327	242	1,071	18.0	2.3	1.7	7.5	
Charles Davis	F	Vanderbilt	1	1987–1988	16	187	38	17	92	11.7	2.4	1.1	5.8	
Harry Davis	F	Florida State	1	1979–1980	4	30	6	0	13	7.5	1.5	0.0	3.3	
Willie Davis	C	North Texas	1	1970–1971	8	29	13	2	18	3.6	1.6	0.3	2.3	
Johnny Dawkins	G	Duke	3	1986–1989	178	4,944	474	994	2,316	27.8	2.7	5.6	13.0	
Eric Dawson	F	Midwestern State	1	2011–2012	4	39	10	0	15	9.8	2.5	0.0	3.8	
Austin Daye	F	Gonzaga	2	2013–2015	40	383	81	15	161	9.6	2.0	0.4	4.0	
Nando de Colo	G	(France) Cholet Basket	2	2012–2014	98	1,221	183	170	388	12.5	1.9	1.7	4.0	
Dewayne Dedmon	C	USC	1	2016–2017	76	1,330	496	44	387	17.5	6.5	0.6	5.1	
Vinny Del Negro	G	NC State	6	1992–1998	433	12,565	1,150	1,566	4,844	29.0	2.7	3.6	11.2	
Dell Demps	G	Pacific	1	1995–1996	16	87	9	8	53	5.4	0.6	0.5	3.3	
Justin Dentmon	G	Washington	1	2011–2012	2	19	1	1	4	9.5	0.5	0.5	2.0	
DeMar DeRozan	G/F	USC	3	2018–2021	206	7,060	1,096	1,277	4,455	34.3	5.3	6.2	21.6	
Mamadi Diakite	F	Virginia	1	2023–2024	3	16	3	2	12	5.3	1.0	0.7	4.0	
Derrick Dial	G	Eastern Michigan	2	1999–2001	41	302	64	26	126	7.4	1.6	0.6	3.1	
Boris Diaw	F/C	(France) Élan Béarnais	5	2011–2016	331	7,459	1,246	858	2,438	22.5	3.8	2.6	7.4	
Gorgui Dieng	C	Louisville	2	2020–2021; 2022–2023	47	539	149	72	206	11.5	3.2	1.5	4.4	
Coby Dietrick	F/C	San Jose State	8	1973–1979; 1982–1983	569	11,849	2,835	1,285	3,857	20.8	5.0	2.3	6.8	
Byron Dinkins	G	Charlotte	1	1990–1991	10	144	11	19	34	14.4	1.1	1.9	3.4	
Ike Diogu	F	Arizona State	1	2011–2012	2	14	1	0	2	7.0	0.5	0.0	1.0	
Kevin Duckworth	C	Eastern Illinois	1	1986–1987	14	122	31	6	45	8.7	2.2	0.4	3.2	
David Duke Jr.	G	Providence	2	2023–2025	10	85	15	9	42	8.5	1.5	0.9	4.2	
Tim Duncan^ (#21)	F/C	Wake Forest	19	1997–2016	1,392	47,368	15,091	4,225	26,496	34.0	10.8	3.0	19.0	
Mike Dunleavy Sr.	G	South Carolina	1	1982–1983	79	1,619	134	437	613	20.5	1.7	5.5	7.8	

=== E to F ===
All-time roster
Player	Pos.	Pre-draft team	Yrs	Seasons	Statistics									Ref.
Player	Pos.	Pre-draft team	Yrs	Seasons	GP	MP	REB	AST	PTS	MPG	RPG	APG	PPG	Ref.
Jim Eakins	C	BYU	1	1977–1978	16	251	46	17	89	15.7	2.9	1.1	5.6	
Keith Edmonson	G	Purdue	1	1983–1984	40	521	70	27	346	13.0	1.8	0.7	8.7	
Howard Eisley	G	Boston College	1	1994–1995	15	56	6	18	7	3.7	0.4	1.2	0.5	
Mario Elie	G/F	American International	2	1998–2000	126	3,508	386	282	1,045	27.8	3.1	2.2	8.3	
Sean Elliott^{+} (#32)	F	Arizona	11	1989–1993; 1994–2001	669	22,093	2,941	1,700	9,659	33.0	4.4	2.5	14.4	
Dale Ellis	G/F	Tennessee	2	1992–1994	159	5,321	567	187	2,536	33.5	3.6	1.2	15.9	
Francisco Elson	C	California	2	2006–2008	111	1,866	471	71	494	16.8	4.2	0.6	4.5	
Melvin Ely	C	Fresno State	1	2006–2007	6	65	14	4	19	10.8	2.3	0.7	3.2	
Drew Eubanks	F	Oregon State	4	2018–2022	148	1,735	556	114	687	11.7	3.8	0.8	4.6	
Mike Evans	G	Kansas State	1	1979–1980	79	1,246	107	230	486	15.8	1.4	2.9	6.2	
Desmon Farmer	G	USC	1	2008–2009	3	54	6	2	13	18.0	2.0	0.7	4.3	
Jamie Feick	C	Michigan State	1	1996–1997	38	614	211	26	146	16.2	5.6	0.7	3.8	
Danny Ferry	F	Duke	3	2000–2003	194	3,088	388	140	796	15.9	2.0	0.7	4.1	
Michael Finley	G/F	Wisconsin	5	2005–2010	347	8,796	1,032	471	3,223	25.3	3.0	1.4	9.3	
Sleepy Floyd	G	Georgetown	1	1993–1994	53	737	70	101	200	13.9	1.3	1.9	3.8	
Bryn Forbes	G	Michigan State	5	2016–2020; 2021–2022	301	6,350	561	427	2,686	21.1	1.9	1.4	8.9	
T. J. Ford	G	Texas	1	2011–2012	14	191	18	45	51	13.6	1.3	3.2	3.6	
De'Aaron Fox*	G	Kentucky	2	2024–2026	89	2,809	343	561	1,671	31.6	3.9	6.3	18.8	
Will Franklin	F	Purdue	2	1974–1976	34	274	111	15	112	8.1	3.3	0.4	3.3	
Ron Franz	F	Kansas	1	1972–1973	37	511	105	42	276	13.8	2.8	1.1	7.5	
Donnie Freeman^{+}	G	Illinois	3	1970–1972; 1974–1975	191	6,371	577	662	3,920	33.4	3.0	3.5	20.5	

=== G ===
All-time roster
Player	Pos.	Pre-draft team	Yrs	Seasons	Statistics									Ref.
Player	Pos.	Pre-draft team	Yrs	Seasons	GP	MP	REB	AST	PTS	MPG	RPG	APG	PPG	Ref.
Mike Gale	G	Elizabeth City State	6	1975–1981	414	10,702	1,093	1,878	3,299	25.9	2.6	4.5	8.0	
Alex Garcia	G	(Brazil) COC-Ribeirão Preto	1	2003–2004	2	13	0	0	3	6.5	0.0	0.0	1.5	
Tom Garrick	G	Rhode Island	1	1991–1992	19	374	41	63	98	19.7	2.2	3.3	5.2	
Pau Gasol	F/C	(Spain) FC Barcelona	3	2016–2019	168	3,769	1,247	438	1,681	22.4	7.4	2.6	10.0	
Rudy Gay	F	UConn	4	2017–2021	256	5,892	1,426	457	3,043	23.0	5.6	1.8	11.9	
Andrew Gaze	G	Seton Hall	1	1998–1999	19	58	5	6	21	3.1	0.3	0.3	1.1	
Reggie Geary	G	Arizona	1	1997–1998	62	685	67	74	152	11.0	1.1	1.2	2.5	
Alonzo Gee	G	Alabama	1	2010–2011	5	18	3	0	2	3.6	0.6	0.0	0.4	
Gus Gerard	G/F	Virginia	1	1980–1981	11	129	38	9	52	11.7	3.5	0.8	4.7	
George Gervin^ (#44)	G/F	Eastern Michigan	12	1973–1985	899	31,115	4,841	2,523	23,602	34.6	5.4	2.8	26.3	
Artis Gilmore^	C	Jacksonville	5	1982–1987	380	12,387	3,671	579	6,127	32.6	9.7	1.5	16.1	
Manu Ginóbili^ (#20)	G	(Italy) Virtus Bologna	16	2002–2018	1,057	26,859	3,697	4,001	14,043	25.4	3.5	3.8	13.3	
Dion Glover	G	Georgia Tech	1	2004–2005	7	68	11	4	25	9.7	1.6	0.6	3.6	
Anthony Goldwire	G	Houston	1	2002–2003	10	51	3	3	12	5.1	0.3	0.3	1.2	
Drew Gooden	F	Kansas	1	2008–2009	19	320	83	3	187	16.8	4.4	0.2	9.8	
Devonte' Graham	G	Kansas	2	2022–2024	43	840	86	129	373	19.5	2.0	3.0	8.7	
Devin Gray	F	Clemson	1	1996–1997	3	24	5	0	10	8.0	1.7	0.0	3.3	
RaiQuan Gray	F/C	Florida State	1	2023–2024	3	39	7	6	23	13.0	2.3	2.0	7.7	
Danny Green	G/F	North Carolina	8	2010–2018	520	13,438	1,835	866	4,715	25.8	3.5	1.7	9.1	
JaMychal Green	F	Alabama	1	2014–2015	4	25	6	0	8	6.3	1.5	0.0	2.0	
Mike Green	F/C	Louisiana Tech	2	1977–1979	139	2,773	658	182	1,047	19.9	4.7	1.3	7.5	
Sidney Green	F/C	UNLV	3	1990–1993	161	2,428	726	107	863	15.1	4.5	0.7	5.4	
David Greenwood	F/C	UCLA	5	1985–1989; 1990–1991	293	7,663	2,073	531	2,372	26.2	7.1	1.8	8.1	
Paul Griffin	F/C	Western Michigan	4	1979–1983	240	5,157	1,254	639	1,283	21.5	5.2	2.7	5.3	
Pétur Guðmundsson	C	Washington	2	1987–1989	74	1,087	339	91	416	14.7	4.6	1.2	5.6	

=== H ===
All-time roster
Player	Pos.	Pre-draft team	Yrs	Seasons	Statistics									Ref.
Player	Pos.	Pre-draft team	Yrs	Seasons	GP	MP	REB	AST	PTS	MPG	RPG	APG	PPG	Ref.
Cliff Hagan^	G/F	Kentucky	3	1967–1970	94	2,343	439	404	1,423	24.9	4.7	4.3	15.1	
Tom Hagan	G	Vanderbilt	2	1969–1971	69	882	112	131	354	12.8	1.6	1.9	5.1	
Malik Hairston	G	Oregon	2	2008–2010	62	472	77	29	149	7.6	1.2	0.5	2.4	
Marcus Haislip	F	Tennessee	1	2009–2010	10	44	10	0	25	4.4	1.0	0.0	2.5	
Jack Haley	F/C	UCLA	2	1993–1995	59	211	51	3	132	3.6	0.9	0.1	2.2	
Shaler Halimon	G/F	Utah State	2	1971–1973	84	1,125	210	121	450	13.4	2.5	1.4	5.4	
Jordan Hall	G	Saint Joseph's	1	2022–2023	9	83	12	11	28	9.2	1.3	1.2	3.1	
Joe Hamilton	G	North Texas	4	1970–1974	292	8,297	810	1,092	3,781	28.4	2.8	3.7	12.9	
Darrin Hancock	G/F	Kansas	1	1996–1997	1	8	0	1	4	8.0	0.0	1.0	4.0	
Dylan Harper^{x}	G	Rutgers	1	2025–2026	69	1,558	234	266	813	22.6	3.4	3.9	11.8	
Jason Hart	G	Syracuse	2	2001–2002; 2003–2004	63	752	92	93	203	11.9	1.5	1.5	3.2	
Steve Hayes	C	Idaho State	1	1981–1982	9	75	17	4	23	8.3	1.9	0.4	2.6	
Shane Heal	G	(Australia) Geelong Supercats	1	2003–2004	6	72	4	5	22	12.0	0.7	0.8	3.7	
Juancho Hernangómez	F	(Spain) Estudiantes	1	2021–2022	5	51	15	3	7	10.2	3.0	0.6	1.4	
Carl Herrera	F	Houston	3	1995–1998	177	2,746	512	88	852	15.5	2.9	0.5	4.8	
Rod Higgins	F	Fresno State	1	1985–1986	11	128	24	12	47	11.6	2.2	1.1	4.3	
Sean Higgins	G/F	Michigan	2	1990–1992	56	500	71	39	240	8.9	1.3	0.7	4.3	
Wayne Hightower	F	Kansas	1	1970–1971	33	1,220	328	90	478	37.0	9.9	2.7	14.5	
George Hill	G	IUPUI	3	2008–2011	231	5,694	562	555	2,286	24.6	2.4	2.4	9.9	
Simmie Hill	F	West Texas A&M	2	1971–1972; 1973–1974	130	2,682	578	156	964	20.6	4.4	1.2	7.4	
Darrun Hilliard	G	Villanova	1	2017–2018	14	95	7	11	16	6.8	0.5	0.8	1.1	
Denny Holman	G	SMU	1	1967–1968	46	554	78	73	176	12.0	1.7	1.6	3.8	
Carroll Hooser	F	SMU	1	1967–1968	56	720	216	29	316	12.9	3.9	0.5	5.6	
Robert Horry	F	Alabama	5	2003–2008	332	5,575	1,120	384	1,544	16.8	3.4	1.2	4.7	
Stephen Howard	F	DePaul	1	1996–1997	7	69	9	1	26	9.9	1.3	0.1	3.7	
Alfredrick Hughes	G/F	Loyola (IL)	1	1985–1986	68	866	113	61	356	12.7	1.7	0.9	5.2	

=== I to J ===
All-time roster
Player	Pos.	Pre-draft team	Yrs	Seasons	Statistics									Ref.
Player	Pos.	Pre-draft team	Yrs	Seasons	GP	MP	REB	AST	PTS	MPG	RPG	APG	PPG	Ref.
Marc Iavaroni	F	Virginia	2	1984–1986	99	1,847	407	166	572	18.7	4.1	1.7	5.8	
Harrison Ingram^{x}	F	North Carolina	2	2024–2026	12	61	12	4	15	5.1	1.0	0.3	1.3	
Cedric Jackson	G	Cleveland State	1	2009–2010	3	25	4	6	7	8.3	1.3	2.0	2.3	
Jaren Jackson	G/F	Georgetown	4	1997–2001	226	4,892	502	330	1,575	21.6	2.2	1.5	7.0	
Stephen Jackson	G/F	Butler CC	4	2001–2003; 2011–2013	179	4,056	548	315	1,563	22.7	3.1	1.8	8.7	
Damion James	G/F	Texas	1	2013–2014	5	50	12	3	6	10.0	2.4	0.6	1.2	
Othyus Jeffers	G	Robert Morris (IL)	2	2010–2011; 2013–2014	5	42	8	2	9	8.4	1.6	0.4	1.8	
Richard Jefferson	F	Arizona	3	2009–2012	203	6,147	809	320	2,264	30.3	4.0	1.6	11.2	
Alize Johnson	F	Missouri State	1	2022–2023	4	30	10	1	7	7.5	2.5	0.3	1.8	
Avery Johnson (#6)	G	Southern	10	1990–1993; 1994–2001	644	20,009	1,309	4,474	6,486	31.1	2.0	6.9	10.1	
DerMarr Johnson	F	Cincinnati	1	2007–2008	5	28	1	1	17	5.6	0.2	0.2	3.4	
Ed Johnson	C	Tennessee State	1	1970–1971	8	159	48	8	52	19.9	6.0	1.0	6.5	
George Johnson	C	Stephen F. Austin	1	1971–1972	67	1,477	464	59	317	22.0	6.9	0.9	4.7	
George Johnson	F/C	Dillard	2	1980–1982	157	3,513	1,056	171	633	22.4	6.7	1.1	4.0	
Keldon Johnson^{x}	F	Kentucky	7	2019–2026	452	12,511	2,432	908	6,842	27.7	5.4	2.0	15.1	
Linton Johnson	F	Tulane	1	2004–2005	2	15	3	0	0	7.5	1.5	0.0	0.0	
Reggie Johnson	F/C	Tennessee	2	1980–1982	100	2,220	495	98	1,028	22.2	5.0	1.0	10.3	
Stanley Johnson	F	Arizona	1	2022–2023	30	469	95	67	174	15.6	3.2	2.2	5.8	
Steve Johnson	C	Oregon State	1	1985–1986	71	1,828	462	95	983	25.7	6.5	1.3	13.8	
Stew Johnson	F	Murray State	1	1975–1976	10	123	19	15	45	12.3	1.9	1.5	4.5	
Tyler Johnson	G	Fresno State	1	2021–2022	3	20	6	5	6	17.7	2.0	1.7	2.0	
Vinnie Johnson	G	Baylor	1	1991–1992	60	1,350	182	145	478	22.5	3.0	2.4	8.0	
Jim Johnstone	F/C	Wake Forest	1	1982–1983	7	54	16	1	7	7.7	2.3	0.1	1.0	
Anthony Jones	G/F	UNLV	1	1986–1987	49	744	95	66	286	15.2	1.9	1.3	5.8	
Bobby Jones	F	Washington	1	2007–2008	3	20	2	1	2	6.7	0.7	0.3	0.7	
Caldwell Jones	F/C	Albany State	1	1989–1990	72	885	230	20	173	12.3	3.2	0.3	2.4	
Collis Jones	F	Notre Dame	2	1971–1973	159	3,632	856	221	1,366	22.8	5.4	1.4	8.6	
Edgar Jones	F/C	Nevada	3	1982–1985	127	2,714	688	123	1,223	21.4	5.4	1.0	9.6	
Larry Jones	G/F	Toledo	1	1972–1973	53	1,254	178	163	530	23.7	3.4	3.1	10.0	
Nick Jones	G	Oregon	2	1968–1969; 1972–1973	7	76	6	6	22	10.9	0.9	0.9	3.1	
Ozell Jones	F/C	Cal State Fullerton	1	1984–1985	67	888	238	56	245	13.3	3.6	0.8	3.7	
Rich Jones^{+}	F/C	Memphis	6	1969–1975	391	13,687	3,137	1,217	6,466	35.0	8.0	3.1	16.5	
Shelton Jones	F	St. John's	1	1988–1989	7	92	16	7	26	13.1	2.3	1.0	3.7	
Steve Jones^{+}	G/F	Oregon	2	1971–1973	97	3,550	363	272	1,758	36.6	3.7	2.8	18.1	
Tre Jones	G	Duke	4	2020–2025	279	5,989	768	1,302	2,276	21.5	2.8	4.7	8.2	
David Jones García^{x}	F	Memphis	1	2025–2026	11	68	13	18	32	6.2	1.2	1.6	2.9	
Cory Joseph	G	Texas	4	2011–2015	204	3,034	376	389	1,062	14.9	1.8	1.9	5.2	

=== K to L ===
All-time roster
Player	Pos.	Pre-draft team	Yrs	Seasons	Statistics									Ref.
Player	Pos.	Pre-draft team	Yrs	Seasons	GP	MP	REB	AST	PTS	MPG	RPG	APG	PPG	Ref.
George Karl	G	North Carolina	5	1973–1978	264	4,449	369	795	1,703	16.9	1.4	3.0	6.5	
Tim Kempton	F/C	Notre Dame	1	1996–1997	10	59	8	2	4	5.9	0.8	0.2	0.4	
Goo Kennedy	F/C	TCU	3	1971–1974	211	4,702	1,362	223	1,882	22.3	6.5	1.1	8.9	
Larry Kenon^{+}	F	Memphis	5	1975–1980	399	14,470	4,114	1,214	8,248	36.3	10.3	3.0	20.7	
Steve Kerr	G	Arizona	4	1998–2001; 2002–2003	206	2,604	158	188	761	12.6	0.8	0.9	3.7	
Jerome Kersey	F	Longwood	2	1998–2000	117	2,009	355	110	466	17.2	3.0	0.9	4.0	
Irv Kiffin	F	Oklahoma Baptist	1	1979–1980	26	212	40	19	82	8.2	1.5	0.7	3.2	
Albert King	G/F	Maryland	1	1988–1989	46	791	140	79	327	17.2	3.0	1.7	7.1	
Gerard King	F	Nicholls	1	1998–1999	19	63	14	4	23	3.3	0.7	0.2	1.2	
Billy Knight	G/F	Pittsburgh	1	1984–1985	52	611	96	59	311	11.8	1.8	1.1	6.0	
Negele Knight	G	Dayton	1	1993–1994	64	1,430	103	197	593	22.3	1.6	3.1	9.3	
Luke Kornet^{x}	C	Vanderbilt	1	2025–2026	68	1,430	414	126	444	21.0	6.1	1.9	6.5	
Larry Krystkowiak	F/C	Montana	1	1986–1987	68	1,004	239	85	451	14.8	3.5	1.3	6.6	
Anthony Lamb	F	Vermont	1	2021–2022	2	8	1	2	0	4.0	0.5	1.0	0.0	
John Lambert	F/C	USC	1	1981–1982	21	271	51	13	65	12.9	2.4	0.6	3.1	
Jeff Lamp	G/F	Virginia	1	1985–1986	30	620	79	53	332	20.7	2.6	1.8	11.1	
Jock Landale	C	Saint Mary's	1	2021–2022	54	589	138	45	265	10.9	2.6	0.8	4.9	
Keith Langford	G	Kansas	1	2007–2008	2	10	2	0	2	5.0	1.0	0.0	1.0	
Romeo Langford	G	Indiana	2	2021–2023	47	887	118	52	308	18.9	2.5	1.1	6.6	
Nicolás Laprovíttola	G	(Brazil) Flamengo	1	2016–2017	18	174	10	28	59	9.7	0.6	1.6	3.3	
Joffrey Lauvergne	F/C	(Serbia) Partizan	1	2017–2018	55	534	171	41	226	9.7	3.1	0.7	4.1	
Mo Layton	G	USC	1	1977–1978	41	498	32	108	182	12.1	0.8	2.6	4.4	
Manny Leaks	F/C	Niagara	3	1968–1971	151	4,975	1,763	175	2,484	32.9	11.7	1.2	16.5	
Jeff Lebo	G	North Carolina	1	1989–1990	4	32	4	3	6	8.0	1.0	0.8	1.5	
David Lee	F	Florida	1	2016–2017	79	1,477	441	124	576	18.7	5.6	1.6	7.3	
Kawhi Leonard^{+}	F	San Diego State	7	2011–2018	407	12,364	2,511	924	6,654	30.4	6.2	2.3	16.3	
Clifford Lett	G	Florida	1	1990–1991	7	99	7	7	34	14.1	1.0	1.0	4.9	
Steve Lingenfelter	F	South Dakota State	1	1983–1984	3	14	4	1	2	4.7	1.3	0.3	0.7	
Riney Lochmann	F	Kansas	3	1967–1970	170	2,205	466	143	731	13.0	2.7	0.8	4.3	
Darrell Lockhart	C	Auburn	1	1983–1984	2	14	3	0	4	7.0	1.5	0.0	2.0	
Brad Lohaus	F/C	Iowa	2	1995–1996; 1997–1998	41	375	45	22	126	9.1	1.1	0.5	3.1	
Stan Love	F	Oregon	1	1974–1975	12	64	24	9	29	5.3	2.0	0.8	2.4	
John Lucas II	G	Maryland	1	1983–1984	63	1,807	180	673	689	28.7	2.9	10.7	10.9	
Trey Lyles	F	Kentucky	2	2019–2021	86	1,629	447	83	519	18.9	2.9	1.0	6.0	

=== M ===
All-time roster
Player	Pos.	Pre-draft team	Yrs	Seasons	Statistics									Ref.
Player	Pos.	Pre-draft team	Yrs	Seasons	GP	MP	REB	AST	PTS	MPG	RPG	APG	PPG	Ref.
Sam Mack	G/F	Houston	1	1992–1993	40	267	48	15	142	6.7	1.2	0.4	3.6	
Ian Mahinmi	C	(France) STB Le Havre	2	2007–2008; 2009–2010	32	188	57	3	122	5.9	1.8	0.1	3.8	
Moses Malone^	F/C	Petersburg HS (VA)	1	1994–1995	17	149	46	6	49	8.8	2.7	0.4	2.9	
Mike Maloy	F	Davidson	1	1972–1973	9	63	15	3	20	7.0	1.7	0.3	2.2	
Sandro Mamukelashvili	F/C	Seton Hall	3	2022–2025	126	1,575	463	143	781	12.5	3.7	1.1	6.2	
Boban Marjanović	C	(Serbia) Vršac	1	2015–2016	54	508	194	21	297	9.4	3.6	0.4	5.5	
Sean Marks	F/C	California	2	2004–2006	48	425	99	15	157	8.9	2.1	0.3	3.3	
Kevin Martin	G	Western Carolina	1	2015–2016	16	261	29	12	99	16.3	1.8	0.8	6.2	
Roger Mason Jr.	G	Virginia	2	2008–2010	161	4,011	413	310	1,470	24.9	2.6	1.9	9.1	
Tony Massenburg	F	Maryland	3	1990–1992; 2004–2005	97	869	221	18	280	9.0	2.3	0.2	2.9	
Wes Matthews	G	Wisconsin	1	1985–1986	75	1,853	131	476	817	24.7	1.7	6.3	10.9	
Vernon Maxwell	G	Florida	3	1988–1990; 1996–1997	200	5,251	502	600	2,196	26.3	2.5	3.0	11.0	
Ray McCallum Jr.	G	Detroit Mercy	1	2015–2016	31	256	31	33	68	8.3	1.0	1.1	2.2	
Amal McCaskill	F/C	Marquette	1	2001–2002	27	153	36	4	52	5.7	1.3	0.1	1.9	
Doug McDermott	F	Creighton	3	2021–2024	161	3,237	302	212	1,508	20.1	1.9	1.3	9.4	
Antonio McDyess	F/C	Alabama	2	2009–2011	150	3,004	850	167	836	20.0	5.7	1.1	5.6	
Bill McGill	F/C	Utah	1	1969–1970	24	181	57	17	75	7.5	2.4	0.7	3.1	
Elton McGriff	C	Creighton	2	1967–1969	44	746	224	8	305	17.0	5.1	0.2	6.9	
Maurice McHartley	G/F	North Carolina A&T	2	1967–1968; 1969–1970	85	2,468	317	272	1,035	29.0	3.7	3.2	12.2	
Forrest McKenzie	F	Loyola Marymount	1	1986–1987	6	42	7	1	17	7.0	1.2	0.2	2.8	
Jordan McLaughlin^{x}	G	USC	2	2024–2026	62	406	41	65	134	6.5	0.7	1.0	2.2	
Mark McNamara	F/C	California	2	1983–1985	82	1,100	334	31	421	13.4	4.1	0.4	5.1	
Pops Mensah-Bonsu	F	George Washington	1	2008–2009	3	20	10	0	15	6.7	3.3	0.0	5.0	
Ron Mercer	G/F	Kentucky	1	2003–2004	39	516	49	22	195	13.2	1.3	0.6	5.0	
Chimezie Metu	F	USC	2	2018–2020	47	250	69	23	109	5.3	1.5	0.5	2.3	
Andre Miller	G	Utah	1	2015–2016	13	181	27	29	56	13.9	2.1	2.2	4.3	
Bob Miller	F	Cincinnati	1	1983–1984	2	8	5	1	4	4.0	2.5	0.5	2.0	
Patty Mills	G	Saint Mary's	10	2011–2021	665	13,846	1,181	1,597	6,218	20.8	1.8	2.4	9.4	
Riley Minix	F	Morehead State	2	2024–2026	4	15	4	1	9	3.8	1.0	0.3	2.3	
Mike Mitchell	F	Auburn	7	1981–1988	488	15,992	2,683	679	9,799	32.8	5.5	1.4	20.1	
Todd Mitchell	F	Purdue	1	1988–1989	2	33	3	1	5	16.5	1.5	0.5	2.5	
Nazr Mohammed	C	Kentucky	2	2004–2006	103	1,803	565	48	635	17.5	5.5	0.5	6.2	
Gene Moore	F/C	Saint Louis	2	1970–1972	93	2,506	924	114	1,219	26.9	9.9	1.2	13.1	
Johnny Moore (#00)	G	Texas	9	1980–1988; 1989–1990	519	13,420	1,546	3,865	4,890	25.9	3.0	7.4	9.4	
Jaylen Morris	G	Molloy	1	2021–2022	3	16	2	2	2	5.3	0.7	0.7	0.7	
Glenn Mosley	F	Seton Hall	1	1978–1979	26	221	64	19	85	8.5	2.5	0.7	3.3	
Donatas Motiejūnas	F/C	(Italy) Benetton Treviso	1	2018–2019	3	13	3	1	6	4.3	1.0	0.3	2.0	
Dejounte Murray^{+}	G	Washington	5	2016–2022	320	8,257	1,920	1,540	3,993	25.8	6.0	4.8	12.5	
Pete Myers	G/F	Little Rock	2	1987–1988; 1990–1991	30	431	55	62	141	14.4	1.8	2.1	4.7	

=== N to O ===
All-time roster
Player	Pos.	Pre-draft team	Yrs	Seasons	Statistics									Ref.
Player	Pos.	Pre-draft team	Yrs	Seasons	GP	MP	REB	AST	PTS	MPG	RPG	APG	PPG	Ref.
Swen Nater^{+}	C	UCLA	2	1973–1975	140	4,714	2,123	209	2,075	33.7	15.2	1.5	14.8	
Calvin Natt	F	Louisiana–Monroe	1	1988–1989	10	185	32	11	85	18.5	3.2	1.1	8.5	
Gary Neal	G	Towson	3	2010–2013	204	4,375	457	342	1,985	21.4	2.2	1.7	9.7	
Ed Nealy	F	Kansas State	2	1986–1988	128	1,817	506	132	365	14.2	4.0	1.0	2.9	
Louie Nelson	G	Washington	1	1976–1977	4	57	7	3	18	14.3	1.8	0.8	4.5	
Rasho Nesterović	C	(Italy) Virtus Bologna	3	2003–2006	232	5,653	1,401	218	1,482	24.4	6.0	0.9	6.4	
Bob Netolicky	F/C	Drake	2	1972–1974	103	3,897	952	283	1,798	37.8	9.2	2.7	17.5	
Chuck Nevitt	C	NC State	1	1993–1994	1	1	1	0	3	1.0	1.0	0.0	3.0	
Ira Newble	F	Miami (OH)	1	2000–2001	27	184	35	6	54	6.8	1.3	0.2	2.0	
Gaylon Nickerson	G	Northwestern Oklahoma State	1	1996–1997	3	36	4	1	13	12.0	1.3	0.3	4.3	
Rich Niemann	C	Saint Louis	1	1971–1972	33	524	155	24	121	15.9	4.7	0.7	3.7	
Kurt Nimphius	F/C	Arizona State	1	1987–1988	72	919	153	53	316	12.8	2.1	0.7	4.4	
Sylvester Norris	C	Jackson State	1	1979–1980	17	189	43	6	40	11.1	2.5	0.4	2.4	
Steve Novak	F	Marquette	1	2010–2011	23	197	23	3	93	8.6	1.0	0.1	4.0	
Julius Nwosu	C	Liberty	1	1994–1995	23	84	24	3	31	3.7	1.0	0.1	1.3	
Fabricio Oberto	F/C	(Argentina) Atenas de Cordoba	4	2005–2009	274	4,176	1,063	249	991	15.2	3.9	0.9	3.6	
Mark Olberding	F	Minnesota	7	1975–1982	536	13,845	3,004	1,391	5,626	25.8	5.6	2.6	10.5	
Kelly Olynyk^{x}	C	Gonzaga	1	2025–2026	42	360	76	49	133	8.6	1.8	1.2	3.2	
Cedi Osman	F	(Turkey) Anadolu Efes	1	2023–2024	72	1,269	180	119	489	17.6	2.5	1.7	6.8	
Matt Othick	G	Arizona	1	1992–1993	4	39	2	7	8	9.8	0.5	1.8	2.0	
Larry Owens	F	Oral Roberts	1	2010–2011	7	31	4	1	9	4.4	0.6	0.1	1.3	
Tom Owens	F/C	South Carolina	1	1975–1976	39	538	155	41	226	13.8	4.0	1.1	5.8	

=== P to Q ===
All-time roster
Player	Pos.	Pre-draft team	Yrs	Seasons	Statistics									Ref.
Player	Pos.	Pre-draft team	Yrs	Seasons	GP	MP	REB	AST	PTS	MPG	RPG	APG	PPG	Ref.
Tony Parker^ (#9)	G	(France) Paris Basket Racing	17	2001–2018	1,198	37,276	3,313	6,829	18,943	31.1	2.8	5.7	15.8	
Cherokee Parks	F/C	Duke	1	2001–2002	42	234	58	10	63	5.6	1.4	0.2	1.5	
Žarko Paspalj	F	(Serbia) Partizan	1	1989–1990	28	181	30	10	72	6.5	1.1	0.4	2.6	
Brandon Paul	G	Illinois	1	2017–2018	64	576	68	37	147	9.0	1.1	0.6	2.3	
Chris Paul	G	Wake Forest	1	2024–2025	82	2,292	296	605	723	28.0	3.6	7.4	8.8	
Billy Paultz^{+}	F/C	St. John's	6	1975–1980; 1982–1983	378	11,591	3,203	1,076	5,297	30.7	8.5	2.8	14.0	
John Paxson	G	Notre Dame	2	1983–1985	127	1,717	101	364	628	13.5	0.8	2.9	4.9	
Wiley Peck	G	Mississippi State	1	1979–1980	52	628	183	33	180	12.1	3.5	0.6	3.5	
Rich Peek	C	Louisiana Tech	1	1967–1968	51	759	197	22	237	14.9	3.9	0.4	4.6	
George Peeples	F/C	Iowa	1	1971–1972	6	125	35	5	29	20.8	5.8	0.8	4.8	
Will Perdue	C	Vanderbilt	4	1995–1999	261	5,250	1,796	146	1,462	20.1	6.9	0.6	5.6	
Chuck Person	F	Auburn	3	1994–1996; 1997–1998	222	5,619	875	292	2,154	25.3	3.9	1.3	9.7	
Roger Phegley	G/F	Bradley	3	1981–1984	119	1,227	169	123	601	10.3	1.4	1.0	5.1	
Gene Phillips	G	SMU	2	1971–1973	31	184	21	14	78	5.9	0.7	0.5	2.5	
Mason Plumlee^{x}	C	Duke	1	2025–2026	6	47	13	4	5	7.8	2.2	0.7	0.8	
Jakob Pöltl	C	Utah	5	2018–2023	326	7,458	2,382	673	2,859	22.9	7.3	2.1	8.8	
Quincy Pondexter	G/F	Washington	1	2018–2019	53	292	46	24	98	5.5	0.9	0.5	1.8	
Terry Porter	G	Wisconsin-Stevens Point	3	1999–2002	220	4,585	556	677	1,613	20.8	2.5	3.1	7.3	
Cincy Powell^{+}	F/C	Portland	3	1967–1970	228	7,721	2,047	471	4,392	33.9	9.0	2.1	19.3	
Paul Pressey	G/F	Tulsa	2	1990–1992	126	2,442	271	413	679	19.4	2.2	3.3	5.4	
Joshua Primo	G	Alabama	2	2021–2023	54	1,058	126	99	316	19.6	2.3	1.8	5.9	
Bob Quick	G/F	Xavier	1	1971–1972	6	57	14	1	26	9.5	2.3	0.2	4.3	
Chris Quinn	G	Notre Dame	1	2010–2011	41	292	25	42	81	7.1	0.6	1.0	2.0	

=== R to S ===
All-time roster
Player	Pos.	Pre-draft team	Yrs	Seasons	Statistics									Ref.
Player	Pos.	Pre-draft team	Yrs	Seasons	GP	MP	REB	AST	PTS	MPG	RPG	APG	PPG	Ref.
Ed Rains	F	South Alabama	2	1981–1983	83	929	124	62	287	11.2	1.5	0.7	3.5	
Theo Ratliff	F/C	Wyoming	1	2009–2010	21	183	40	9	34	8.7	1.9	0.4	1.6	
J. R. Reid	F	North Carolina	4	1992–1996	249	5,145	1,122	198	2,051	20.7	4.5	0.8	8.2	
Richard Rellford	F	Michigan	1	1987–1988	4	42	7	1	16	10.5	1.8	0.3	4.0	
Kevin Restani	F/C	San Francisco	3	1979–1982	159	3,110	595	277	1,344	19.6	3.7	1.7	8.5	
Cameron Reynolds	F	Tulane	1	2020–2021	3	6	0	0	2	2.0	0.0	0.0	0.7	
Jeremy Richardson	G/F	Delta State	1	2007–2008	5	29	1	1	10	5.8	0.2	0.2	2.0	
Josh Richardson	G/F	Tennessee	2	2021–2023	63	1,510	179	186	720	24.0	2.8	3.0	11.4	
Doc Rivers	G	Marquette	2	1994–1996	138	2,177	238	277	613	15.8	1.7	2.0	4.4	
Fred Roberts	F/C	BYU	2	1983–1985	101	1,836	339	120	690	18.2	3.4	1.2	6.8	
Alvin Robertson^{+}	G	Arkansas	5	1984–1989	389	12,525	2,087	2,094	6,285	32.2	5.4	5.4	16.2	
David Robinson^ (#50)	C	Navy	14	1989–2003	987	34,271	10,497	2,441	20,790	34.7	10.6	2.5	21.1	
Glenn Robinson	F	Purdue	1	2004–2005	9	157	24	8	90	17.4	2.7	0.9	10.0	
Oliver Robinson	G	UAB	1	1982–1983	35	147	17	21	101	4.2	0.5	0.6	2.9	
Dave Robisch	F/C	Kansas	1	1983–1984	4	37	8	1	8	9.3	2.0	0.3	2.0	
Isaiah Roby	F	Nebraska	1	2022–2023	42	474	107	38	172	11.3	2.5	0.9	4.1	
Dennis Rodman^	F	Southeastern Oklahoma State	2	1993–1995	128	4,557	2,190	281	719	35.6	17.1	2.2	5.6	
Malik Rose	F	Drexel	8	1997–2005	509	9,373	2,460	438	3,815	18.4	4.8	0.9	7.5	
Scott Roth	F	Wisconsin	1	1988–1989	47	464	56	48	158	9.9	1.2	1.0	3.4	
Donald Royal	F	Notre Dame	1	1991–1992	60	718	124	34	252	12.0	2.1	0.6	4.2	
Rubin Russell	G	North Texas	1	1967–1968	16	157	23	6	65	9.8	1.4	0.4	4.1	
Luka Šamanić	F	(Slovenia) KK Olimpija	2	2019–2021	36	356	78	21	138	9.9	2.2	0.6	3.8	
Frankie Sanders	G/F	Southern	1	1978–1979	22	263	59	35	132	12.0	2.7	1.6	6.0	
Melvin Sanders	G/F	Oklahoma State	1	2005–2006	16	113	23	3	41	7.1	1.4	0.2	2.6	
Mike Sanders	G/F	UCLA	1	1982–1983	26	393	94	19	183	15.1	3.6	0.7	7.0	
Ron Sanford	F	New Mexico	1	1971–1972	1	2	0	0	0	2.0	0.0	0.0	0.0	
Jason Sasser	F	Texas Tech	1	1996–1997	6	62	7	1	17	10.3	1.2	0.2	2.8	
Tomáš Satoranský	G	(Spain) FC Barcelona	1	2021–2022	1	9	1	0	3	9.0	1.0	0.0	3.0	
Alex Scales	G	Oregon	1	2005–2006	1	0	0	0	0	0.0	0.0	0.0	0.0	
Dwayne Schintzius	C	Florida	1	1990–1991	42	398	121	17	158	9.5	2.9	0.4	3.8	
Shawnelle Scott	C	St. John's	1	2000–2001	27	144	50	4	43	5.3	1.9	0.1	1.6	
Willie Scott	F	Alabama State	1	1969–1970	8	51	4	2	13	6.4	0.5	0.3	1.6	
John Shumate	F/C	Notre Dame	2	1979–1981	49	1,296	301	76	556	26.4	6.1	1.6	11.3	
James Silas^{+} (#13)	G	Stephen F. Austin	9	1972–1981	618	18,916	1,960	2,406	10,290	30.6	3.2	3.9	16.7	
Bobby Simmons	G/F	DePaul	1	2010–2011	2	16	0	2	0	8.0	0.0	1.0	0.0	
Jonathon Simmons	G/F	Houston	2	2015–2017	133	2,205	256	184	814	16.6	1.9	1.4	6.1	
Scott Sims	G	Missouri	1	1977–1978	12	95	13	20	30	7.9	1.1	1.7	2.5	
Keith Smart	G	Indiana	1	1988–1989	2	12	1	2	2	6.0	0.5	1.0	1.0	
Charles Smith	F/C	Pittsburgh	2	1995–1997	51	1,155	267	50	394	22.6	5.2	1.0	7.7	
Charles Smith	G	New Mexico	1	2001–2002	60	1,141	133	80	441	19.0	2.2	1.3	7.4	
John Smith	C	CSU–Pueblo	2	1968–1970	125	3,138	1,138	110	840	25.1	9.1	0.9	6.7	
Ken Smith	F	Tulsa	1	1975–1976	19	164	24	7	82	8.6	1.3	0.4	4.3	
Larry Smith	F/C	Alcorn State	1	1992–1993	66	833	268	28	85	12.6	4.1	0.4	1.3	
Robert Smith	G	UNLV	1	1982–1983	7	25	3	2	12	3.6	0.4	0.3	1.7	
Steve Smith	G	Michigan State	2	2001–2003	130	3,243	292	221	1,255	24.9	2.2	1.7	9.7	
Mike Smrek	C	Canisius	1	1988–1989	43	623	129	12	193	14.5	3.0	0.3	4.5	
Jeremy Sochan	F	Baylor	4	2022–2026	212	5,373	1,196	547	2,206	25.3	5.6	2.6	10.4	
Felton Spencer	C	Louisville	1	1999–2000	26	149	39	3	50	5.7	1.5	0.1	1.9	
Tiago Splitter	F/C	(Spain) Saski Baskonia	5	2010–2015	311	6,157	1,637	389	2,576	19.8	5.3	1.3	8.3	
Damon Stoudamire	G	Arizona	1	2007–2008	31	413	47	53	106	13.3	1.5	1.7	3.4	
Rod Strickland	G	DePaul	3	1989–1992	146	5,250	617	1,203	2,026	36.0	4.2	8.2	13.9	
John Stroeder	F	Montana	1	1988–1989	1	2	0	0	0	2.0	0.0	0.0	0.0	
Jon Sundvold	G	Missouri	3	1985–1988	198	3,939	226	759	1,771	19.9	1.1	3.8	8.9	
Greg Sutton	G	Oral Roberts	1	1991–1992	67	601	47	91	246	9.0	0.7	1.4	3.7	
Skeeter Swift	G	East Tennessee State	2	1972–1974	58	1,276	98	165	564	22.0	1.7	2.8	9.7	

=== T to V ===
All-time roster
Player	Pos.	Pre-draft team	Yrs	Seasons	Statistics									Ref.
Player	Pos.	Pre-draft team	Yrs	Seasons	GP	MP	REB	AST	PTS	MPG	RPG	APG	PPG	Ref.
Levern Tart	G/F	Bradley	1	1970–1971	33	821	133	101	432	24.9	4.0	3.1	13.1	
Collis Temple	F	LSU	1	1974–1975	24	102	31	15	42	4.3	1.3	0.6	1.8	
Garrett Temple	G	LSU	2	2009–2011	16	214	16	14	82	13.4	1.0	0.9	5.1	
Chuck Terry	F	Long Beach State	2	1973–1975	140	2,279	383	141	639	16.3	2.7	1.0	4.6	
David Thirdkill	G/F	Bradley	1	1984–1985	2	52	7	3	15	26.0	3.5	1.5	7.5	
Kurt Thomas	F	TCU	2	2007–2009	107	1,928	543	80	469	18.0	5.1	0.7	4.4	
Malcolm Thomas	F	San Diego State	2	2011–2012; 2013–2014	4	30	12	1	3	7.5	3.0	0.3	0.8	
Mychal Thompson	F/C	Minnesota	1	1986–1987	49	1,210	276	87	605	24.7	5.6	1.8	12.3	
Anthony Tolliver	F/C	Creighton	1	2008–2009	19	208	41	17	52	10.9	2.2	0.9	2.7	
Linton Townes	G/F	James Madison	1	1984–1985	1	8	1	0	2	8.0	1.0	0.0	2.0	
Ansley Truitt	C	California	1	1972–1973	16	86	38	2	39	5.4	2.4	0.1	2.4	
Trent Tucker	G	Minnesota	1	1991–1992	24	415	37	27	155	17.3	1.5	1.1	6.5	
Hedo Türkoğlu	F	(Turkey) Anadolu Efes	1	2003–2004	80	2,073	358	154	739	25.9	4.5	1.9	9.2	
Ime Udoka	F	Portland State	3	2007–2009; 2010–2011	160	2,481	434	130	726	15.5	2.7	0.8	4.5	
Beno Udrih	G	(Italy) Olimpia Milano	3	2004–2007	207	2,683	217	364	1,086	13.0	1.0	1.8	5.2	
Stanley Umude	G	Arkansas	1	2025–2026	2	7	0	1	2	3.5	0.0	0.5	1.0	
Nick Van Exel	G	Cincinnati	1	2005–2006	65	986	91	123	355	15.2	1.4	1.9	5.5	
Dennis Van Zant	F	Azusa Pacific	1	1975–1976	1	2	1	0	2	2.0	1.0	0.0	2.0	
Devin Vassell^{x}	G/F	Florida State	6	2020–2026	370	10,446	1,413	955	5,212	28.2	3.8	2.6	14.1	
Jacque Vaughn	G	Kansas	3	2006–2009	168	2,191	164	345	563	13.0	1.0	2.1	3.4	
Bob Verga	G	Duke	1	1967–1968	31	1,285	138	74	735	41.5	4.5	2.4	23.7	
Jay Vincent	F	Michigan State	1	1988–1989	24	551	92	22	217	23.0	3.8	0.9	9.0	

=== W to Z ===
All-time roster
Player	Pos.	Pre-draft team	Yrs	Seasons	Statistics									Ref.
Player	Pos.	Pre-draft team	Yrs	Seasons	GP	MP	REB	AST	PTS	MPG	RPG	APG	PPG	Ref.
Lonnie Walker IV	G	Miami (FL)	4	2018–2022	208	4,240	492	330	1,952	20.4	2.4	1.6	9.4	
Samaki Walker	F	Louisville	2	1999–2001	132	1,943	515	67	681	14.7	3.9	0.5	5.2	
Charlie Ward	G	Florida State	1	2003–2004	36	425	48	45	119	11.8	1.3	1.3	3.3	
Henry Ward	G/F	Jackson State	2	1975–1977	88	859	173	41	413	9.8	2.0	0.5	4.7	
Jim Ware	F	Oklahoma City	1	1968–1969	1	15	7	1	7	15.0	7.0	1.0	7.0	
Bob Warren	G	Vanderbilt	3	1972–1975	116	1,650	195	145	557	14.2	1.7	1.3	4.8	
Darius Washington Jr.	G	Memphis	1	2007–2008	18	146	20	15	53	8.1	1.1	0.8	2.9	
Lindy Waters III^{x}	G	Oklahoma State	1	2025–2026	40	285	29	19	95	7.1	0.7	0.5	2.4	
Quinndary Weatherspoon	G	Mississippi State	2	2019–2021	31	199	18	19	58	6.4	0.6	0.6	1.9	
Brant Weidner	F	William & Mary	1	1983–1984	8	38	11	0	8	4.8	1.4	0.0	1.0	
Chris Welp	C	Washington	1	1989–1990	13	56	12	5	15	4.3	0.9	0.4	1.2	
Victor Wembanyama*	C	(France) Metropolitans 92	3	2023–2026	181	5,499	1,997	641	4,238	30.4	11.0	3.5	23.4	
Blake Wesley	G	Notre Dame	3	2022–2025	156	2,228	236	378	669	14.3	1.5	2.4	4.3	
David West	F/C	Xavier	1	2015–2016	78	1,404	309	143	554	18.0	4.0	1.8	7.1	
Ennis Whatley	G	Alabama	1	1985–1986	2	14	0	3	2	7.0	0.0	1.5	1.0	
Derrick White	G	Colorado	5	2017–2022	237	6,094	776	914	2,741	25.7	3.3	3.9	11.6	
James White	G/F	Cincinnati	1	2006–2007	6	137	20	5	50	22.8	3.3	0.8	8.3	
Jerome Whitehead	F/C	Marquette	1	1988–1989	52	580	129	17	168	11.2	2.5	0.3	3.2	
Chris Whitney	G	Clemson	2	1993–1995	65	518	42	81	114	8.0	0.6	1.2	1.8	
Joe Wieskamp	G	Iowa	1	2021–2022	29	205	14	9	61	7.1	0.5	0.3	2.1	
Gene Wiley	C	Wichita State	1	1967–1968	1	21	3	0	1	21.0	3.0	0.0	1.0	
Michael Wiley	F	Long Beach State	1	1980–1981	33	271	64	11	188	8.2	1.9	0.3	5.7	
Morlon Wiley	G	Long Beach State	1	1991–1992	3	13	1	1	6	4.3	0.3	0.3	2.0	
Dominique Wilkins^	G/F	Georgia	1	1996–1997	63	1,945	402	119	1,145	30.9	6.4	1.9	18.2	
Jeff Wilkins	F/C	Illinois State	1	1985–1986	27	522	127	18	130	19.3	4.7	0.7	4.8	
Mike Wilks	G	Rice	1	2004–2005	48	278	25	33	81	5.8	0.5	0.7	1.7	
Brandon Williams	G	Davidson	1	1998–1999	3	4	1	0	2	1.3	0.3	0.0	0.7	
Eric Williams	F	Providence	1	2006–2007	16	88	14	6	42	5.5	0.9	0.4	2.6	
Kevin Williams	G	St. John's	1	1983–1984	19	200	13	43	75	10.5	0.7	2.3	3.9	
Marcus Williams	F	Arizona	2	2007–2009	3	5	0	0	4	1.7	0.0	0.0	1.3	
Monty Williams	F	Notre Dame	3	1995–1998	154	2,781	408	184	1,090	18.1	2.6	1.2	7.1	
Ray Williams	G	Minnesota	1	1985–1986	23	397	37	111	164	17.3	1.6	4.8	7.1	
Reggie Williams	G/F	Georgetown	2	1989–1991	32	422	67	51	213	13.2	2.1	1.6	6.7	
Reggie Williams	F	VMI	1	2014–2015	20	105	17	10	37	5.3	0.9	0.5	1.9	
Kevin Willis	F/C	Michigan State	2	2002–2004	119	1,213	324	35	461	10.2	2.7	0.3	3.9	
Bill Willoughby	F/C	Dwight Morrow HS (NJ)	1	1982–1983	52	1,062	190	56	319	20.4	3.7	1.1	6.1	
Bobby Wilson	F	Kansas	1	1967–1968	69	1,562	450	55	616	22.6	6.5	0.8	8.9	
Ricky Wilson	G	George Mason	1	1987–1988	18	373	26	63	104	20.7	1.4	3.5	5.8	
David Wingate	G/F	Georgetown	2	1989–1991	103	2,419	270	254	663	23.5	2.6	2.5	6.4	
Skip Wise	G	Clemson	1	1975–1976	2	10	3	1	4	5.0	1.5	0.5	2.0	
Greg Wittman	F	Western Carolina	1	1970–1971	5	30	9	0	8	6.0	1.8	0.0	1.6	
David Wood	F	Nevada	1	1992–1993	64	598	97	34	155	9.3	1.5	0.5	2.4	
Leon Wood	G	Cal State Fullerton	1	1987–1988	38	830	51	155	352	21.8	1.3	4.1	9.3	
Rich Yonakor	F	North Carolina	1	1981–1982	10	70	27	3	33	7.0	2.7	0.3	3.3	
Thaddeus Young	F	Georgia Tech	1	2021–2022	26	370	93	59	158	14.2	3.6	2.3	1.3	
Tyler Zeller	C	North Carolina	1	2019–2020	2	4	4	0	2	2.0	2.0	0.0	1.0	
Phil Zevenbergen	C	Washington	1	1987–1988	8	58	13	3	30	7.3	1.6	0.4	3.8	

== International players ==
In the National Basketball Association (NBA), foreign players—also known as international players—are those who were born outside of the United States. Players who were born in U.S. overseas territories, such as Puerto Rico, U.S. Virgin Islands and Guam, are considered international players even if they are U.S. citizens. In some borderline cases, the NBA takes into consideration whether a player desires to be identified as international. The first foreign-born player in franchise history is Bobby Croft. Croft, who was the first Canadian player to earn a scholarship to a major U.S. basketball college, played one season for the Texas Chaparrals in the ABA.

In the 1997 draft, the Spurs drafted Tim Duncan who was born in the U.S. Virgin Islands. Although Duncan is a United States citizen, the NBA considers him an international player. In the 1999 and 2001 draft, the Spurs drafted Manu Ginóbili from Argentina and Tony Parker from France respectively. These three international players, Duncan, Ginóbili and Parker, played together from 2002 until Duncan's retirement in 2016, became All-Stars and led the Spurs to four NBA titles. Aside from the "Big Three" of Duncan, Ginóbili and Parker, the number of international players in the Spurs roster also grew in the 2000s. On the opening day of the 2013–14 season, the Spurs set the record for the most international players on a team roster with ten international players from seven countries.

The following is a list of international players who have played for the Spurs, listed by their national team affiliation.

Argentina

- Manu Ginóbili
- Nicolás Laprovíttola
- Fabricio Oberto

Austria

- Jakob Pöltl

Australia

- Aron Baynes (born in New Zealand, grew up in Australia, became a naturalized Australian citizen, represents Australia internationally)
- Andrew Gaze
- Shane Heal
- Jock Landale
- Patty Mills

The Bahamas

- Mychal Thompson (born in the Bahamas but never represented the Bahamas internationally)

Brazil

- Alex Garcia
- Tiago Splitter

Canada

- Joel Anthony
- Bobby Croft
- Cory Joseph
- Trey Lyles
- Kelly Olynyk
- Joshua Primo
- Mike Smrek

China

- Kyle Anderson (Born in the United States, obtained Chinese citizenship, represents China internationally).
- Mengke Bateer

Croatia

- Luka Šamanić

Czech Republic

- Tomáš Satoranský

(Democratic Republic of the Congo) DR Congo

- Bismack Biyombo

Dominican Republic

- David Jones García

France

- Sidy Cissoko
- Nando de Colo
- Boris Diaw
- Joffrey Lauvergne
- Ian Mahinmi
- Tony Parker (born in Belgium to an American father and a Dutch mother, grew up in France, represents France internationally)
- Victor Wembanyama

(Georgia (country)) Georgia

- Sandro Mamukelashvili (Born in the United States by Georgian parents, he grew up in Georgia).

Germany

- Uwe Blab (born in West Germany, also represented West German internationally before the reunification)
- Chris Welp (born in West Germany, also represented West German internationally before the reunification)

(United Kingdom) Great Britain

- Pops Mensah-Bonsu

Guinea

- Mamadi Diakite

Iceland

- Pétur Guðmundsson

Italy

- Marco Belinelli
- Mike D'Antoni (born in the United States, has dual U.S. and Italian citizenships, represented Italy internationally)

Ivory Coast

- Matt Costello (Born in the United States, became a naturalized Ivorian citizen, represents Ivory Coast internationally).

Latvia

- Dāvis Bertāns

Lithuania

- Donatas Motiejūnas

North Macedonia

- Darius Washington, Jr. (born in the United States, became a naturalized Macedonian citizen, represents Macedonia internationally)

Netherlands

- Francisco Elson
- Swen Nater (born in the Netherlands, grew up in the United States, but never represented the Netherlands internationally)

New Zealand

- Sean Marks

Nigeria

- Charles Bassey
- Ike Diogu (born in the United States to Nigerian parents, represents Nigeria internationally)
- Chimezie Metu (Born in the United States to Nigerian parents, represents Nigeria internationally).
- Julius Nwosu
- Ime Udoka (born in the United States to a Nigerian father, represented Nigeria internationally)

Poland

- Jeremy Sochan (Born in the United States to a Polish mother and an American father. Has Polish, British, and American citizenship, represents Poland internationally).

Senegal

- Gorgui Dieng

Serbia

- Boban Marjanović
- Žarko Paspalj (born in SR Montenegro, SFR Yugoslavia (now Montenegro), represented SFR Yugoslavia and FR Yugoslavia internationally)

Slovenia

- Radoslav Nesterović (born in SR Slovenia, SFR Yugoslavia (now Slovenia), represented Slovenia internationally)
- Beno Udrih (born in SR Slovenia, SFR Yugoslavia (now Slovenia), represented Slovenia internationally)

Spain

- Pau Gasol
- Juancho Hernangómez

Turkey

- Cedi Osman (Born in Macedonia to a Bosniak mother and a Turkish father, represents Turkey internationally)
- Hedo Türkoğlu

United States

- Tim Duncan (born in U.S. Virgin Islands, represented the United States internationally)
- Steve Kerr (born in Lebanon to American parents, represented the United States internationally)
- Dominique Wilkins (born in France to American parents, represented the United States internationally)

Venezuela

- Carl Herrera (born in Trinidad and Tobago, became a naturalized Venezuelan citizen, represented Venezuela internationally.

== Notes ==
- ^{a} Players can sometimes be assigned more than one jersey number.
- ^{b} Each year is linked to an article about that particular ABA or NBA season.
- ^{c} Only includes achievements as Spurs players.
