= Mark Turenshine =

American-Israeli basketball player (1944–2016)

Mark Turenshine מרק טורנשיין
Personal information
- Born: December 20, 1944 Brooklyn, New York, U.S.
- Died: February 26, 2016 (aged 71)
- Listed height: 6 ft 5 in (1.96 m)

Career information
- High school: Sheepshead Bay (Brooklyn, New York)
- College: St. Francis Brooklyn (1963–1966)
- NBA draft: 1966: undrafted

Career history
- ?–?: Hapoel Tel Aviv

Mark Turenshine (also spelled "Torenshine"; Hebrew: מרק טורנשיין; December 20, 1944 – February 26, 2016) was an American-Israeli basketball player. He played for Hapoel Tel Aviv in the Israel Basketball Premier League from 1969 to 1977, and for the Israeli national basketball team.

== Biography ==
Turenshine was born in Brooklyn, New York to a Jewish family. He was 6 ft 5 in (1.96 m). He was later a resident of Canoga Park, California.

He attended and played basketball at Sheepshead Bay High School ('62). It inducted Turenshine into the Sheepshead Bay High School Hall of Fame in 2012.

Turenshine then attended St. Francis College, and played basketball for the St. Francis Terriers. In college he had a .558 per cent field goal percentage, including a .741 field goal percentage in the 1964–65 season. He was voted into the St. Francis College Hall of Fame in 2000. In 1966-67 he was voted New York City Amateur Athlete of the Year for basketball by the Downtown Athletic Club.

He played in the 1966 Pan American Maccabiah Games in Brazil, at which Team USA won a gold medal. He played with, among others, Barry Leibowitz and future NBA players Dave Newmark and Rick Weitzman.

In 1968, Turenshine made aliyah. He joined the Israeli professional basketball team Hapoel Tel Aviv in the Israel Basketball Premier League, playing for it from 1969 to 1977.

Turenshine also played for the Israeli national basketball team in the 1969 European Championship for Men, 1970 Asian Olympics (winning a silver medal), 1971 European Championship for Men, and 1972 Pre-Olympic Basketball Tournament.

He later returned to the United States and became a businessman. He rose to the position of general manager of the personal emergency services company Life Alert, where he worked for 35 years.

Turenshine died in 2016 and was buried at Mount Sinai, Simi Valley, California.
