= Mount Sinai Simi Valley =

- Interactive map of Mount Sinai Simi Valley

Details
- Established: 1997
- Location: 6150 Mount Sinai Drive, Simi Valley, Ventura County, California, U.S.
- Country: United States
- Coordinates: 34.2867°N 118.6667°W
- Style: Jewish
- Owned by: Sinai Temple (Los Angeles)
- Website: Mount Sinai Simi Valley
- Find a Grave: Mount Sinai Simi Valley

Mount Sinai Simi Valley is a Jewish cemetery located at 6150 Mount Sinai Drive, in Simi Valley, California; which opened in 1997.

== History ==
Mount Sinai Simi Valley was a sister property to Mount Sinai Hollywood Hills when members of the Cemetery Management Committee of Sinai Temple (Los Angeles) identified the need for Jewish burial properties for future generations.

Mount Sinai Simi Valley sits on 150 acres of land in the Santa Susana Pass which ensures that there will be available burial space to accommodate the needs for the Los Angeles Jewish community for the next 250 years. A notable section within Mount Sinai Simi Valley is the Caves of Abraham, which is a series of graves that though they appear to be built above ground are actually built directly in to the hillside. The section received the approval from the Chief Rabbinate of Israel for meeting standards of acceptability according to Jewish practice and it is the only place outside of Israel where a person can receive a genuine cave burial.

== Notable interments ==
- Warren Berlinger (1937–2020), actor
- Hy Cohen (1931–2021), baseball player and coach
- Jack DeLeon (1924–2006), comedic actor
- Alison Greenspan (1972–2021), movie and tv producer
- Betty Lou Keim (1938–2010), actress
- Bobby Mallon (1919–2008), actor, one of the Little Rascals
- Shepard Menken (1921–1999), actor
- Norman Powell (1934–2021), tv producer
- Tom Sherak (1945–2014), actor and producer
- Mark Turenshine (1944–2016), American-Israeli basketball player
- Heidi Weisel (1961–2021), fashion designer
- Sam Rubin (1960–2024), entertainment anchor
