= Sheepshead Bay High School =

Public school in New York City

Location
- 3000 Avenue X Brooklyn, New York; United States; 40°35′39″N 73°56′13″W

Information
- Type: Public
- Opened: 1959
- Status: Closed
- Closed: 2016
- School district: 22
- Superintendent: Aimee Horowitz
- Principal: John P. O'Mahoney
- Color: Blue Orange white
- Mascot: Shark
- Nickname: Sharks

Sheepshead Bay High School is a defunct public high school in Brooklyn, New York City, New York. Closed in 2016, the building currently operates as Frank J. Macchiarola Educational Complex, housing several smaller high schools.

== History ==
Sheepshead Bay High School was a large, multi-cultural high school in Brooklyn, New York City that closed in 2016. SBHS opened in 1959, welcoming ninth to twelfth grade students. The first graduating class was 1961. When the school opened there were no juniors or seniors and the sophomores were the senior class for three years.

== Closure ==
On March 12, 2013, the New York City Department of Education's Panel For Educational Policy voted to approve plans to phase out Sheepshead Bay High School and introduce four new schools.

== Notable alumni ==
- Randall Amster (1984) – author, professor
- Elayne Boosler (1969) – actress, comedian
- Frank Brooks (circa 1996) – MLB player
- Duval Clear a.k.a. Masta Ace (circa 1984) – rapper
- Larry David (1965) – comedian; film/television producer/writer
- Warren Davis (1973) – Q*bert designer/programmer
- Terry Gross (1968) – radio talk-show host
- Howard Kurtz (1970) – journalist
- Katorah Marrero a.k.a. Young M.A (2010) – rapper
- Anthony Melchiorri – hospitality expert and television personality
- Brad Meltzer (1988) Author & TV Personality
- Donna Pescow (1972) – actress
- Rico Petrocelli (1961) – MLB player
- Gene Pritsker (1989) – Composer
- Fred Stoller – stand-up comedian/voice artist/writer
- Glenn Thrush, New York Times White House correspondent
- Mark Turenshine (1944-2016) - American-Israeli basketball player
- Kelly Wallace (1983) – television news correspondent

== Notable faculty ==
- Dov Markus (born 1946) - Israeli-American soccer player
