= Bob Chlupsa =

American baseball player (1945–2024)

- Pitcher
- Born: September 16, 1945; New York, New York, U.S.
- Died: July 17, 2024 (aged 78); Garden City, New York, U.S.
- Batted: Right Threw: Right

MLB debut
- July 16, 1970, for the St. Louis Cardinals

Last MLB appearance
- June 4, 1971, for the St. Louis Cardinals

MLB statistics
- Win–loss record: 0–2
- Earned run average: 8.84
- Strikeouts: 11
- Stats at Baseball Reference

Teams
- St. Louis Cardinals (1970–1971)

Robert Joseph Chlupsa (September 16, 1945 – July 17, 2024) was an American Major League Baseball pitcher. Chlupsa played for the St. Louis Cardinals in 1970 and 1971.

Chlupsa attended Cardinal Hayes High School and Manhattan College where he played baseball and basketball for the Jaspers. He was drafted by the San Diego Rockets, nowadays based in Houston, in the 13th round of the 1967 NBA draft.

Chlupsa died in Garden City, New York on July 17, 2024, at the age of 78.
