= Kelly Wallace =

American journalist (born 1966)

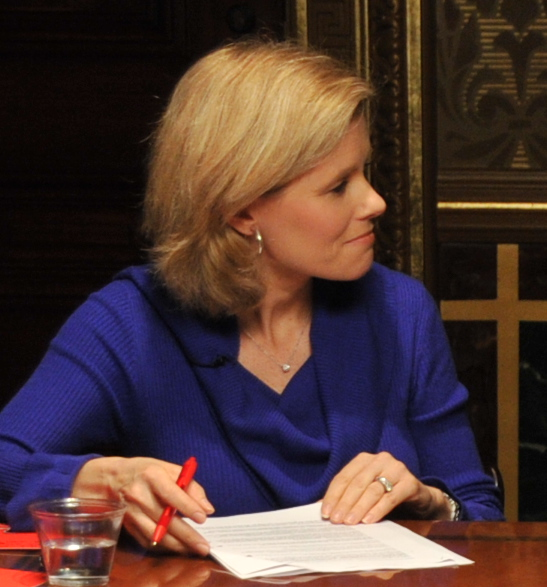
- Wallace in 2011
- Born: Kelly Jean Wallace; December 21, 1966 (age 59); Brooklyn, New York, U.S.
- Education: University of Pennsylvania
- Occupation: Journalist
- Years active: 1990–present
- Spouse: Matt Saal
- Children: 2

Kelly Jean Wallace (born December 21, 1966) is a television journalist who reported for CNN. She previously worked for the CBS Evening News and iVillage.

== Early life, education, and personal life ==
Kelly Jean Wallace was born on December 21, 1966, in Brooklyn, New York, where she graduated from Sheepshead Bay High School in 1983. She is a 1987 graduate of the Wharton School of the University of Pennsylvania, where she received her Bachelor of Science degree magna cum laude in Economics.

She is married to Matt Saal, a television producer formerly from MSNBC's The Rachel Maddow Show, who currently works as an executive producer for Bloomberg Television. They have two daughters and live on the Upper West Side of the borough of Manhattan in New York City.

== Career ==
Wallace started her journalistic career at CNN in 1990, as a producer, then worked at KRQE in Albuquerque, New Mexico, for three years before returning to New York City to work a year at Fox News. She went back to work at CNN circa 2000, remaining there until her departure to CBS News in 2007. Her next job was working for iVillage, as Chief Correspondent and Executive Director of Digital Video.

She has interviewed Michelle Obama for iVillage's new Guest Editor program along with interviews with Secretary Kathleen Sebelius of Health & Human Services, Alicia Keys, Jill Biden, Elizabeth Warren, Gabby Douglas, Bethenny Frankel, Michele Tafoya, Sue Herera, and Tamron Hall. Wallace frequently appeared on The Today Show, MSNBC's Jansing & Co., Now with Alex Wagner and Daily Rundown with Chuck Todd.

== Honors and awards ==
Wallace won the 2012 Gracie Award for Outstanding Reporter/Correspondent.
