= 1967 NBA draft =

Basketball player selection

General information
- Sport: Basketball
- Dates: May 3, 1967 (Rounds 1–11); May 4, 1967 (Rounds 12–20)
- Location: Plaza Hotel (New York City, New York)

Overview
- 162 total selections in 20 rounds
- League: NBA
- First selection: Jimmy Walker, Detroit Pistons
- Hall of Famers: 4: G Earl Monroe; G Walt Frazier; C Mel Daniels; G Louie Dampier

The 1967 NBA draft was the 21st annual draft of the National Basketball Association (NBA). The draft was held on May 3 and 4, 1967, before the 1967–68 season. In this draft, 12 NBA teams took turns selecting amateur U.S. college basketball players. A player who had finished his four-year college eligibility was eligible for selection. If a player left college early, he would not be eligible for selection until his college class graduated. The first two picks in the draft belonged to the teams that finished last in each division, with the order determined by a coin flip. The Detroit Pistons won the coin flip and were awarded the first overall pick, while the Baltimore Bullets were awarded the second pick. The remaining first-round picks and the subsequent rounds were assigned to teams in reverse order of their win–loss record in the previous season. Five teams that had the best records in previous season were not awarded second round draft picks. Two expansion franchises, the Seattle SuperSonics and the San Diego Rockets, took part in the NBA Draft for the first time and were assigned the sixth and seventh pick in the first round, along with the last two picks of each subsequent round. The draft consisted of 20 rounds comprising 162 players selected.

== Draft selections and draftee career notes ==
Jimmy Walker from Providence College was selected first overall by the Detroit Pistons. Earl Monroe from Winston-Salem State University, who went on to win the Rookie of the Year Award in his first season, was drafted second by the Baltimore Bullets. Monroe, fifth pick Walt Frazier, ninth pick Mel Daniels, and fourth round pick Louie Dampier have been inducted to the Basketball Hall of Fame. Monroe, Frazier, and Daniels were also named in the 50 Greatest Players in NBA History list announced at the league's 50th anniversary in 1996. Monroe and Frazier both won the NBA championship with the Knicks in 1973. Three seasons earlier in 1970, Frazier was also a member of the Knicks team that won the NBA championship for the first time. Frazier was selected to seven All-NBA Teams, six All-Star Games and seven All-Defensive Teams, while Monroe was selected to one All-NBA Team and four All-Star Games. Walker and 19th pick Bob Rule are the only other players from this draft who have been selected to an NBA All-Star Game. Daniels, the 9th pick, opted to play in the American Basketball Association (ABA) with the Minnesota Muskies. He won the ABA Most Valuable Player Award twice and was selected to five All-ABA Teams and seven ABA All-Star Games while winning three ABA championships as the center for the Indiana Pacers. He later played one season in the NBA with the New York Nets after the ABA–NBA merger. After his playing career, he became a coach for the Indiana Pacers and served two games as their interim head coach in 1988. Dampier, drafted in the fourth round by Cincinnati, elected to play with the ABA Kentucky Colonels, where he played for all nine seasons of its existence (including the 1975 ABA championship) while being an ABA All-Star seven times. Pat Riley, the 7th pick, and Phil Jackson, the 17th pick, became successful NBA head coaches after ending their playing career. Riley won five NBA championships as head coach; four with the Los Angeles Lakers in the 1980s and one with the Miami Heat in 2006. He also won the Coach of the Year Award for a record three times, tied with Don Nelson. Jackson won eleven NBA championships, the most in NBA history. He led the Chicago Bulls to win three straight championships twice over separate three year periods; during 1991–1993 and 1996–1998. He then captured his third "three-peat" with the Lakers during 2000–2002, before winning two more title in 2009 and 2010. He also won a Coach of the Year Award in 1996 with the Bulls. Both coaches have been inducted to the Basketball Hall of Fame as a coach. They were also named among the Top 10 Coaches in NBA History announced at the league's 50th anniversary in 1996.

First pick Jimmy Walker was also drafted in the 1967 NFL/AFL draft, despite never having played college football. He was drafted last in the 17-round draft by the New Orleans Saints. He stayed with his basketball career and became a two-time All-Star. On the other hand, the first pick in the 1967 NFL/AFL draft, Bubba Smith, was drafted by an NBA team. He was selected with the 114th pick in the 11th round by the Baltimore Bullets. However, he stayed with his football career and played nine seasons in the NFL as a defensive end.

Future St. Louis Cardinals pitcher Bob Chlupsa was drafted by the Rockets in the thirteenth round out of Manhattan College.

== Key ==
Pos.	G	F	C
Position	Guard	Forward	Center

^	Denotes player who has been inducted to the Naismith Memorial Basketball Hall of Fame
^{+}	Denotes player who has been selected for at least one All-Star Game
^{#}	Denotes player who has never appeared in an NBA regular-season or playoff game
^{~}	Denotes player who has been selected as Rookie of the Year

== Draft ==
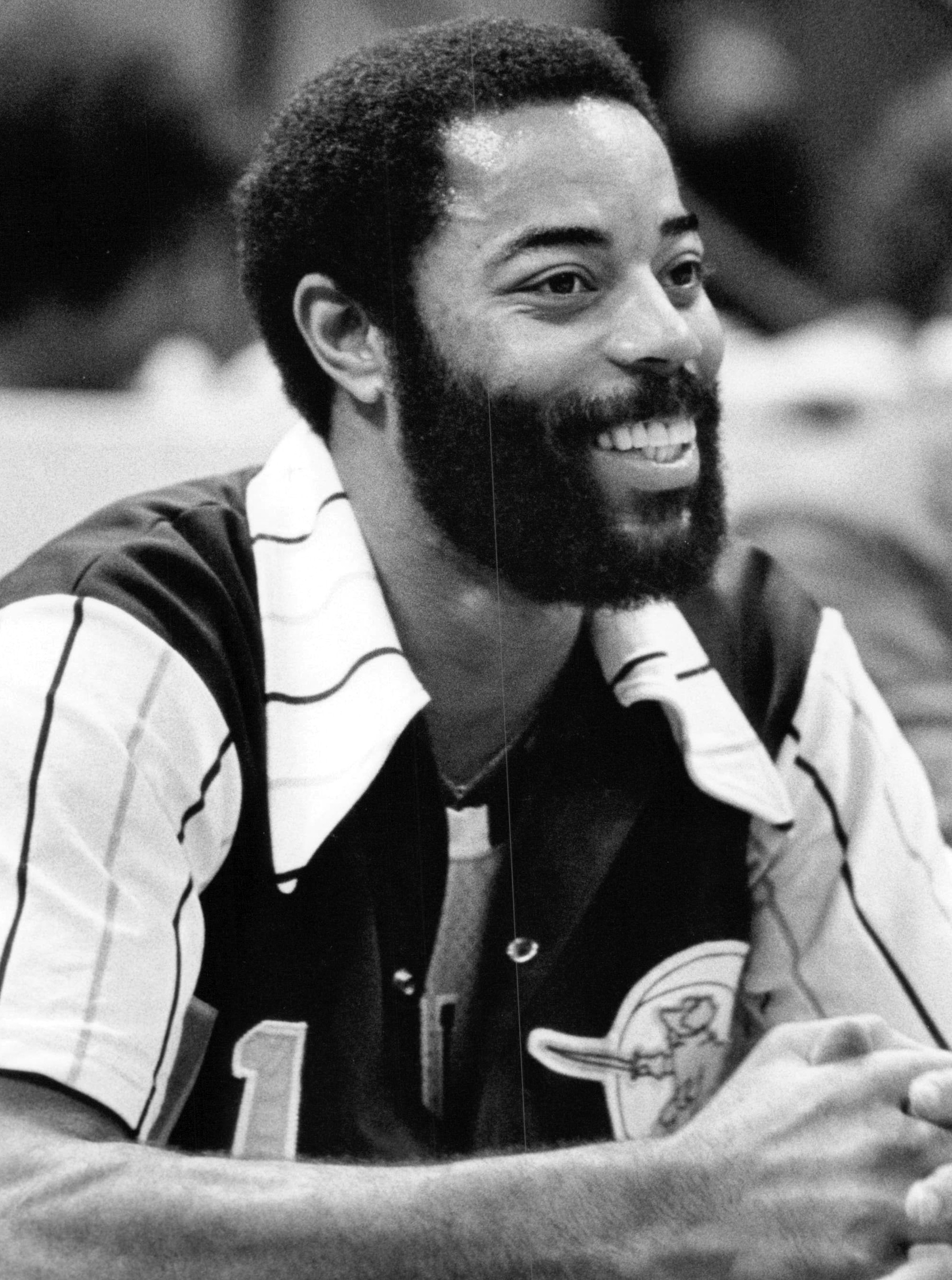
Walt Frazier was selected fifth overall by the New York Knicks.

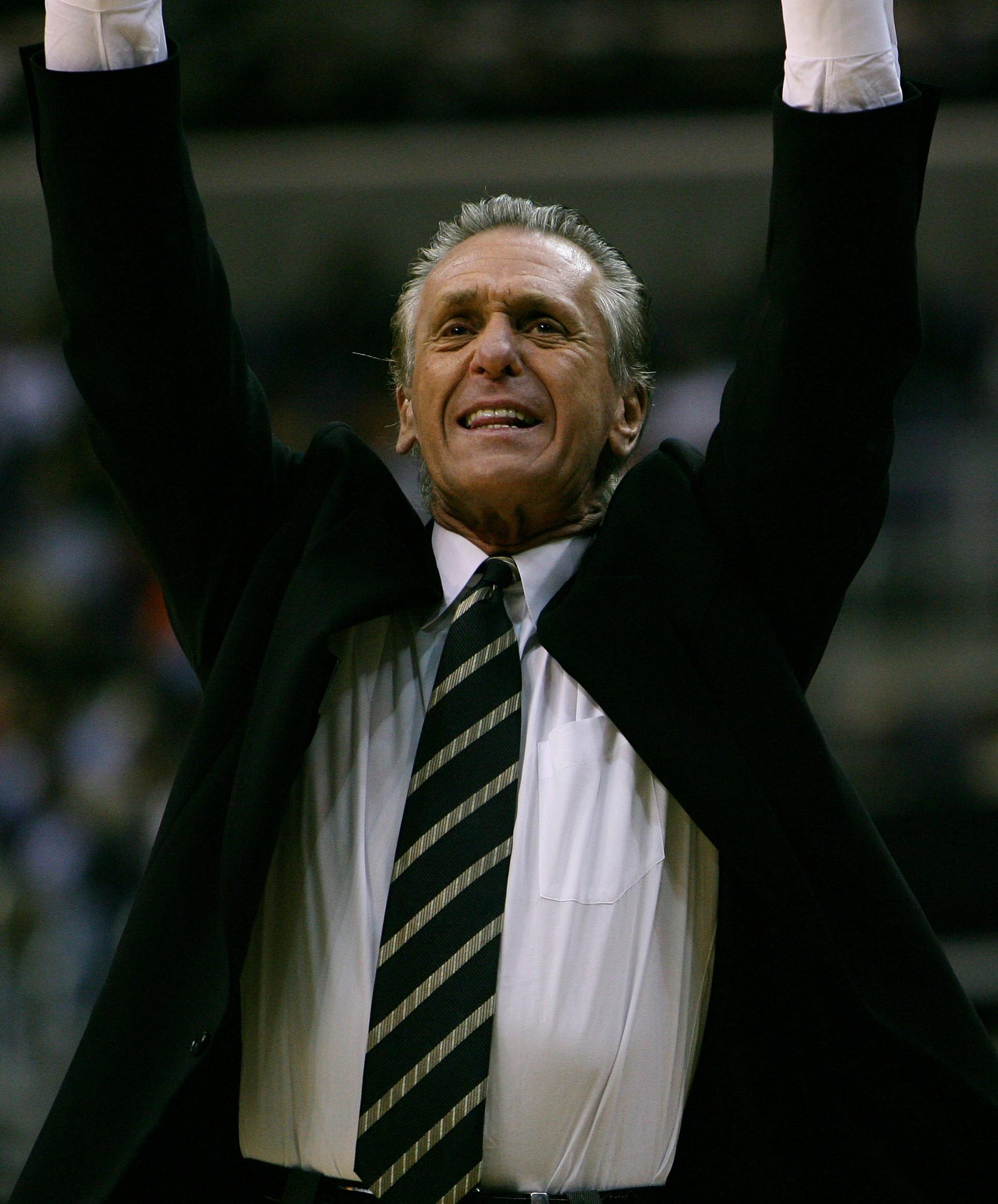
Pat Riley was selected seventh overall by the San Diego Rockets.

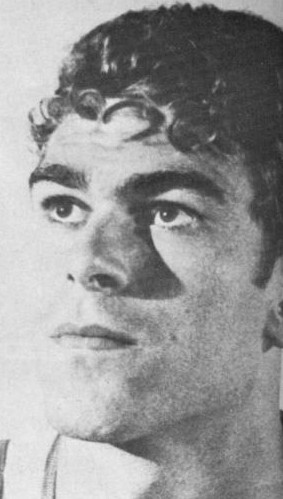
Phil Jackson was selected 17th overall by the New York Knicks.

Rnd.	Pick	Player	Pos.	Nationality (Note: Nationality indicates the player's national team or representative nationality. If a player has not competed at the international level, then the nationality indicates the national team which the player is eligible to represent according to FIBA rules.)	Team	School / club team
1	1	Jimmy Walker^{+}	G	United States	Detroit Pistons	Providence (Sr.)
1	2	Earl Monroe^^{~}	G	United States	Baltimore Bullets	Winston-Salem State (Sr.)
1	3	Clem Haskins	G	United States	Chicago Bulls	Western Kentucky (Sr.)
1	4	Sonny Dove	F	United States	Detroit Pistons (from Los Angeles)^{[a]}	St. John's (Sr.)
1	5	Walt Frazier^	G	United States	New York Knicks	Southern Illinois (Sr.)
1	6	Al Tucker	F	United States	Seattle SuperSonics	Oklahoma Baptist (Sr.)
1	7	Pat Riley^	G/F	United States	San Diego Rockets	Kentucky (Sr.)
1	8	Tom Workman	F/C	United States	St. Louis Hawks	Seattle (Sr.)
1	9	Mel Daniels^	C	United States	Cincinnati Royals	New Mexico (Sr.)
1	10	Dave Lattin	F/C	United States	San Francisco Warriors	Texas Western (Sr.)
1	11	Mal Graham	G	United States	Boston Celtics	NYU (Sr.)
1	12	Craig Raymond	C	United States	Philadelphia 76ers	Brigham Young (Sr.)
2	13	Jimmy Jones	G/F	United States	Baltimore Bullets	Grambling (Sr.)
2	14	Steve Sullivan^{#}	F	United States	Detroit Pistons	Georgetown (Sr.)
2	15	Byron Beck	F/C	United States	Chicago Bulls	Denver (Sr.)
2	16	Randolph Mahaffey^{#}	F	United States	Los Angeles Lakers	Clemson (Sr.)
2	17	Phil Jackson^	F/C	United States	New York Knicks	North Dakota (Sr.)
2	18	Bob Netolicky^{#}	F/C	United States	San Diego Rockets	Drake (Sr.)
2	19	Bob Rule^{+}	F/C	United States	Seattle SuperSonics	Colorado State (Sr.)
3	20	Malkin Strong^{#}	C	United States	Baltimore Bullets	Seattle (Sr.)
3	21	Darrell Hardy^{#}	F	United States	Detroit Pistons	Baylor (Sr.)
3	22	John Dickson^{#}	C	United States	Chicago Bulls	Arkansas State (Sr.)
3	23	Dwight Smith^{#}	G	United States	Los Angeles Lakers	Western Kentucky (Sr.)
3	24	Gary Gregor	F/C	United States	New York Knicks	South Carolina (Jr.)
3	25	Bob Verga	G	United States	St. Louis Hawks	Duke (Sr.)
3	26	Gary Gray	G	United States	Cincinnati Royals	Oklahoma City (Sr.)
3	27	Bill Turner	F	United States	San Francisco Warriors	Akron (Sr.)
3	28	Sam Smith^{#}	F	United States	Cincinnati Royals	Kentucky Wesleyan (Sr.)
3	29	Richie Moore^{#}	G	United States	San Diego Rockets	Hiram Scott (Sr.)
3	30	Sam Singleton^{#}	G	United States	Seattle SuperSonics	Omaha (Sr.)
3	31	Nick Jones	G	United States	San Diego Rockets	Oregon (Sr.)
4	32	Al Salvadori^{#}	F	United States	Baltimore Bullets	South Carolina (Sr.)
4	33	Ron Franz^{#}	F	United States	Detroit Pistons	Kansas (Sr.)
4	34	Jim Burns	G	United States	Chicago Bulls	Northwestern (Sr.)
4	35	Cliff Anderson	G/F	United States	Los Angeles Lakers	Saint Joseph's (Sr.)
4	36	Keith Swagerty^{#}	F	United States	New York Knicks	Pacific (Sr.)
4	37	Wes Bialosuknia^{#}	G	United States	St. Louis Hawks	UConn (Sr.)
4	38	Louie Dampier^	G	United States	Cincinnati Royals	Kentucky (Sr.)
4	39	Bob Lewis	G	United States	San Francisco Warriors	North Carolina (Sr.)
4	40	Nevil Shed^{#}	F	United States	Boston Celtics	Texas Western (Sr.)
4	41	Ronald Kozlicki^{#}	F	United States	San Diego Rockets	Northwestern (Sr.)
4	42	Craig Dill^{#}	C	United States	San Diego Rockets	Michigan (Sr.)
4	43	Larry Bunce^{#}	C	United States	Seattle SuperSonics	Utah State (Sr.)
5	44	Dexter Westbrook^{#}	F	United States	Baltimore Bullets	Group Production (AAU)
5	45	Paul Long	G	United States	Detroit Pistons	Wake Forest (Sr.)
5	46	Dick Pruet^{#}	F	United States	Chicago Bulls	Jacksonville (Sr.)
5	47	Joe Allen^{#}	F	United States	Los Angeles Lakers	Bradley (Sr.)
5	48	Barry Leibowitz^{#}	G	United States	New York Knicks	LIU (Sr.)
5	49	Mike Wittman^{#}	F	United States	St. Louis Hawks	Miami (Florida) (Sr.)
5	50	Trooper Washington^{#}	F	United States	Cincinnati Royals	Cheyney State (Sr.)
5	51	Mike Lynn	F	United States	San Francisco Warriors	UCLA (Jr.)
5	52	Mike Redd^{#}	G	United States	Boston Celtics	US Armed Forces (AAU)
5	53	Jim Reid	F	United States	Philadelphia 76ers	Winston-Salem State (Sr.)
5	54	Plummer Lott	G/F	United States	Seattle SuperSonics	Seattle (Sr.)
5	55	Herb McPherson^{#}	G	United States	San Diego Rockets	Murray State (Sr.)
6	56	Bob Riedy^{#}	F	United States	Baltimore Bullets	Duke (Sr.)
6	57	Vaughn Harper^{#}	F	United States	Detroit Pistons	Syracuse (Sr.)
6	58	Mal Pradd^{#}	G	United States	Chicago Bulls	Dillard (Sr.)
6	59	Gary Keller^{#}	C	United States	Los Angeles Lakers	Florida (Sr.)
6	60	Bob Benfield^{#}	F	United States	New York Knicks	West Virginia (Sr.)
6	61	John Morrison^{#}	G	United States	St. Louis Hawks	Canisius (Sr.)
6	62	Frank Stronczek^{#}	F	United States	Cincinnati Royals	American International (Sr.)
6	63	Dale Schlueter	C	United States	San Francisco Warriors	Colorado State (Sr.)
6	64	Ed Hummer^{#}	F	United States	Boston Celtics	Princeton (Sr.)
6	65	Tim Powers^{#}	F	United States	Philadelphia 76ers	Creighton (Sr.)
6	66	Robert Cole^{#}	G	United States	San Diego Rockets	Saint Louis (Sr.)
6	67	Gordon Harris^{#}	C	United States	Seattle SuperSonics	Washington (Sr.)
7	68	Ron Perry^{#}	G	United States	Baltimore Bullets	Virginia Tech (Sr.)
7	69	Bob Lloyd^{#}	G	United States	Detroit Pistons	Rutgers (Sr.)
7	70	Bob Wolf^{#}	G	United States	Chicago Bulls	Marquette (Sr.)
7	71	Jamie Thompson^{#}	G	United States	Los Angeles Lakers	Wichita State (Sr.)
7	72	Butch Wade^{#}	G	United States	New York Knicks	Indiana State (Sr.)
7	73	Carl Fuller^{#}	C	United States	St. Louis Hawks	Bethune–Cookman (Jr.)
7	74	Charlie Beasley^{#}	G	United States	Cincinnati Royals	SMU (Sr.)
7	75	Sonny Bustion^{#}	F	United States	San Francisco Warriors	Colorado State (Sr.)
7	76	Edgar Lacy^{#}	F	United States	Boston Celtics	Allentown Jets (EPBL)
7	77	Frank Card^{#}	F	United States	Philadelphia 76ers	South Carolina State (Sr.)
7	78	Dick Kolberg^{#}	F	United States	Seattle SuperSonics	UC Santa Barbara (Sr.)
7	79	Elburt Miller^{#}	F	United States	San Diego Rockets	Nevada Southern (Sr.)
8	80	Ed Manning	F	United States	Baltimore Bullets	Jackson State (Sr.)
8	81	George Carter	G/F	United States	Detroit Pistons	St. Bonaventure (Sr.)
8	82	Leon Simon^{#}	G	United States	Chicago Bulls	College of Santa Fe (Sr.)
8	83	Don Carlos^{#}	G	United States	Los Angeles Lakers	Otterbein (Sr.)
8	84	Gil Radday^{#}	F	United States	New York Knicks	St. Francis Brooklyn (Sr.)
8	85	Arvesta Kelly^{#}	G	United States	St. Louis Hawks	Lincoln (Missouri) (Sr.)
8	86	Frank Hollendoner^{#}	C	United States	Cincinnati Royals	Georgetown (Sr.)
8	87	Bob Krulish^{#}	F	United States	San Francisco Warriors	Pacific (Sr.)
8	88	Andy Anderson^{#}	G	United States	Boston Celtics	Canisius (Sr.)
8	89	Jim Connelly^{#}	G	United States	Philadelphia 76ers	Virginia (Sr.)
8	90	Al Grundy^{#}	F	United States	San Diego Rockets	Saint Joseph's (Sr.)
8	91	Willie Wolters^{#}	F	United States	Seattle SuperSonics	Boston College (Sr.)
9	92	Bob Allen^{#}	F	United States	Baltimore Bullets	Arkansas AM&N (Sr.)
9	93	Ernie Laurent^{#}	F	United States	Chicago Bulls	Albuquerque (Sr.)
9	94	Jay McMillen^{#}	F	United States	Los Angeles Lakers	Maryland (Sr.)
9	95	Roy Smith^{#}	C	United States	New York Knicks	Kansas State (Sr.)
9	96	Ed Biedenbach	G	United States	St. Louis Hawks	North Carolina State (Jr.)
9	97	Ron Sepic^{#}	G	United States	Cincinnati Royals	Ohio State (Sr.)
9	98	Richard Dean^{#}	F	United States	San Francisco Warriors	Syracuse (Sr.)
9	99	Henry Brown^{#}	F	United States	Boston Celtics	Lowell Tech (Sr.)
9	100	Ron Filipek	F	United States	Philadelphia 76ers	Tennessee Tech (Sr.)
9	101	Rod McDonald^{#}	F	United States	Seattle SuperSonics	Whitworth (Sr.)
9	102	Ron Coleman^{#}	G	United States	San Diego Rockets	Missouri (Sr.)
10	103	Bill Gillespie^{#}	G	United States	Baltimore Bullets	Montana State (Sr.)
10	104	Jim Boshart^{#}	F	United States	Chicago Bulls	Wake Forest (Sr.)
10	105	Don Kruse^{#}	C	United States	Los Angeles Lakers	Houston (Sr.)
10	106	Bruce Kaplan^{#}	G	United States	New York Knicks	NYU (Sr.)
10	107	Dick Falkenbush^{#}	G	United States	St. Louis Hawks	Saint Michael's (Sr.)
10	108	Willie Davis^{#}	C	United States	Cincinnati Royals	North Texas (Sr.)
10	109	Joe Galbo^{#}	F	United States	San Francisco Warriors	San Francisco State (Sr.)
10	110	Rick Weitzman	G	United States	Boston Celtics	Northeastern (Sr.)
10	111	Butch Erwin^{#}	F	United States	Philadelphia 76ers	Niagara (Sr.)
10	112	Don Duncan^{#}	G	United States	San Diego Rockets	Murray State (Sr.)
10	113	Gary Lechman^{#}	G	United States	Seattle SuperSonics	Gonzaga (Sr.)
11	114	Bubba Smith^{#}	F	United States	Baltimore Bullets	Michigan State (Sr.)
11	115	Phil Andros^{#}	F	United States	Chicago Bulls	New Haven (Sr.)
11	116	Nick Pino^{#}	C	United States	Los Angeles Lakers	Kansas State (Sr.)
11	117	Mark Mirken^{#}	F	United States	New York Knicks	North Carolina (Sr.)
11	118	Ken Calloway^{#}	F	United States	Cincinnati Royals	Cincinnati (Sr.)
11	119	Bill Morgan^{#}	F	United States	San Francisco Warriors	New Mexico (Sr.)
11	120	Joe Harrington^{#}	F	United States	Boston Celtics	Maryland (Sr.)
11	121	Ted Campbell^{#}	F	United States	Philadelphia 76ers	North Carolina A&T (Sr.)
11	122	Randy Matson^{#}	F	United States	Seattle SuperSonics	Texas A&M (Sr.)
11	123	Al Razutis^{#}	F	United States	San Diego Rockets	California Western (Sr.)
12	124	Tony Eatmon^{#}	F	United States	Baltimore Bullets	Pan American (Sr.)
12	125	George Dalzell^{#}	G	United States	Detroit Pistons	Colgate (Sr.)
12	126	Ron Widby^{#}	F	United States	Chicago Bulls	Tennessee (Sr.)
12	127	Ben Monroe^{#}	G	United States	Los Angeles Lakers	New Mexico (Sr.)
12	128	Mike Riordan	G/F	United States	New York Knicks	Providence (Sr.)
12	129	Frank Gaidjunas^{#}	F	United States	Cincinnati Royals	Villanova (Sr.)
12	130	David Fox^{#}	G	United States	San Francisco Warriors	Pacific (Sr.)
12	131	Hubie Marshall^{#}	G	United States	Philadelphia 76ers	La Salle (Sr.)
12	132	Martin Nava^{#}	G	United States	San Diego Rockets	New Mexico Highlands (Sr.)
12	133	Rubin Russell^{#}	G	United States	Seattle SuperSonics	North Texas State (Sr.)
13	134	Lyn Burkholder^{#}	F	United States	Baltimore Bullets	South Carolina (Sr.)
13	135	Matt Aitch^{#}	F	United States	Detroit Pistons	Michigan State (Sr.)
13	136	Tom Storm^{#}	F	United States	Chicago Bulls	Montana State (Sr.)
13	137	Gerry Jones^{#}	G	United States	Los Angeles Lakers	Iowa (Sr.)
13	138	John Moates^{#}	G	United States	Cincinnati Royals	Richmond (Sr.)
13	139	George Mack^{#}	G	United States	Philadelphia 76ers	North Carolina A&T (Sr.)
13	140	John Schroeder^{#}	C	United States	Seattle SuperSonics	Ohio (Sr.)
13	141	Bob Chlupsa^{#}	F	United States	San Diego Rockets	Manhattan (Sr.)
14	142	Paul Mickey^{#}	C	United States	Baltimore Bullets	Penn State (Sr.)
14	143	Don Whitehead^{#}	F	United States	Chicago Bulls	Erskine (Sr.)
14	144	Jerry Pettway^{#}	G	United States	Cincinnati Royals	Northwood (Sr.)
14	145	Wayne Brabender^{#}	F	United States	Philadelphia 76ers	Minnesota Morris (Sr.)
14	146	John Tolbert^{#}	F	United States	San Diego Rockets	South Carolina Area Trade School (Sr.)
14	147	Jim Sutherland^{#}	F	United States	Seattle SuperSonics	Clemson (Sr.)
15	148	Rich Peek^{#}	C	United States	Baltimore Bullets	Louisiana Tech (Sr.)
15	149	Jim Garza^{#}	G	United States	Chicago Bulls	Detroit Tech (Sr.)
15	150	Earl Beechum^{#}	F	United States	Cincinnati Royals	Midwestern (Sr.)
15	151	Sherman Dillard^{#}	G	United States	Philadelphia 76ers	Tulsa Cokes (AAU)
15	152	Willie Campbell^{#}	C	United States	Seattle SuperSonics	Nebraska (Sr.)
16	153	Gary Williams^{#}	F	United States	Baltimore Bullets	Oklahoma City (Sr.)
16	154	Jimmy Dawson^{#}	G	United States	Chicago Bulls	Illinois (Sr.)
16	155	John Vermilyea^{#}	G	United States	Cincinnati Royals	Morningside (Sr.)
16	156	Wayne Chapman^{#}	F	United States	Philadelphia 76ers	Western Kentucky (Jr.)
17	157	Loy Petersen	G	United States	Baltimore Bullets	Oregon State (Jr.)
17	158	Darryl Meachem^{#}	F	United States	Cincinnati Royals	Edinboro State (Sr.)
17	159	Charlie Paulk^{#}	F	United States	Philadelphia 76ers	Northeastern State (Sr.)
18	160	Jerry Southwood^{#}	G	United States	Baltimore Bullets	Vanderbilt (Sr.)
19	161	George Spencer^{#}	G	United States	Baltimore Bullets	Washington University (Sr.)
20	162	Roland West	G	United States	Baltimore Bullets	Cincinnati (Sr.)

== Notable undrafted players ==
These players were not selected in the 1967 draft but played at least one game in the NBA.

Player	Pos.	Nationality	School/club team
Tyrone Britt	G	United States	Johnson C. Smith
Al Jackson	G	United States	Wilberforce
Craig Spitzer	C	United States	Tulane
Doug Sims	F	United States	Kent State

== Trades ==
- ^{a} On February 17, 1967, the Detroit Pistons acquired a first-round pick from the Los Angeles Lakers as compensation when Rudy LaRusso refused to report to the Lakers after being traded to the Pistons in a three-team trade on January 16, 1967. The Pistons used the pick to draft Sonny Dove.

== See also ==
- List of first overall NBA draft picks
