= Doug Sims =

American basketball player (born 1943)

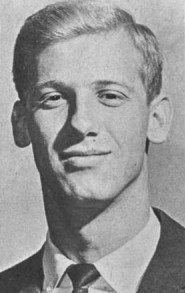
- Sims, circa 1967

Personal information
- Born: June 29, 1943 (age 83) Elba, Alabama, U.S.
- Listed height: 6 ft 7 in (2.01 m)
- Listed weight: 195 lb (88 kg)

Career information
- High school: Springfield (Lakemore, Ohio)
- College: Kent State (1964–1967)
- NBA draft: 1967: undrafted
- Position: Forward
- Number: 11

Career history

Playing
- 1967: Airmatic Valve of Cleveland
- 1968: Cincinnati Royals

Coaching
- 1967–1968: Kent State (assistant)

Career highlights
- Second-team All-MAC (1966)
- Stats at NBA.com
- Stats at Basketball Reference

Hollis Douglas Sims (born June 29, 1943) is an American former professional basketball player. He played in the NBA for the Cincinnati Royals in four games at the beginning of the 1968–69 season. He recorded four points and four rebounds.

== Career statistics ==
Legend
GP	Games played	GS	Games started	MPG	Minutes per game
FG%	Field goal percentage	3P%	3-point field goal percentage	FT%	Free throw percentage
RPG	Rebounds per game	APG	Assists per game	SPG	Steals per game
BPG	Blocks per game	PPG	Points per game	**Bold**	Career high

=== NBA ===
==== Regular season ====
Year	Team	GP	MPG	FG%	FT%	RPG	APG	PPG
1968–69	Cincinnati	4	3.0	.400	–	1.0	.0	1.0
