= Dave Newmark =

American basketball player (born 1946)

Personal information
- Born: September 11, 1946 (age 80) Brooklyn, New York, U.S.
- Listed height: 7 ft 0 in (2.13 m)
- Listed weight: 240 lb (109 kg)

Career information
- High school: Abraham Lincoln (Brooklyn, New York)
- College: Columbia (1965–1968)
- NBA draft: 1968: 3rd round, 31st overall pick
- Drafted by: Chicago Bulls
- Playing career: 1968–1974
- Position: Center
- Number: 12, 29, 24

Career history
- 1968–1969: Chicago Bulls
- 1969–1970: Atlanta Hawks
- 1970–1971: Carolina Cougars
- 1973: Scranton Apollos
- 1973–1974: Hapoel Tel Aviv

Career highlights
- Third-team Parade All-American (1964)

Career NBA and ABA statistics
- Points: 1,003 (5.7 ppg)
- Rebounds: 678 (3.9 rpg)
- Assists: 128 (0.7 apg)
- Stats at NBA.com
- Stats at Basketball Reference

David L. Newmark (born September 11, 1946) is an American former professional basketball player. He played college basketball for the Columbia Lions.

== Biography ==
Born in Brooklyn, New York, Newmark is Jewish, and graduated from Lincoln High School in New York City. He was a high school All-American.

He played in the 1966 Pan American Maccabiah Games in Brazil, at which Team USA won a gold medal. He played with, among others, Barry Leibowitz, Mark Turenshine, and Rick Weitzman.

He played college basketball at Columbia University ('69). As a sophomore in 1966 he had a rebounding average of 13.3 per game (best in the conference), scored 22.4 points per game (second in the conference), and was named an All-American. He was named All-Ivy League in 1966 and 1968.

A 7'0" center, he played in the National Basketball Association on the Chicago Bulls the 1968-69 season and on the Atlanta Hawks in 1969-70. He had been acquired by the Hawks from the Bulls in a three-team trade that also involved the Cincinnati Royals on 12 October 1969. He then spent the 1970–71 season in the American Basketball Association as a member of the Carolina Cougars. In his NBA/ABA career, he scored 1,003 total points and grabbed 678 total rebounds.

Newmark later played in Israel for Hapoel Tel Aviv during the 1973–74 and 1977–78 seasons.

He is a member of both the Columbia University Basketball Hall of Fame, and the Jewish Sports Heritage Association Hall of Fame.

He has two children, Rebecca Newmark Goldman and Brian Newmark.

== Career statistics ==
Legend
GP	Games played	GS	Games started	MPG	Minutes per game
FG%	Field goal percentage	3P%	3-point field goal percentage	FT%	Free throw percentage
RPG	Rebounds per game	APG	Assists per game	SPG	Steals per game
BPG	Blocks per game	PPG	Points per game	**Bold**	Career high

=== NBA/ABA ===
==== Regular season ====
Year	Team	GP	MPG	FG%	3P%	FT%	RPG	APG	PPG
1968–69	Chicago	**81**	14.3	.389		.619	4.3	.7	5.6
1969–70	Atlanta	64	9.6	.429		**.766**	2.7	.7	4.9
1970–71	Carolina (ABA)	31	**14.7**	**.478**	–	.567	**5.1**	**.9**	**7.5**
Career (NBA)		145	12.2	.405		.671	3.6	.7	5.3
Career (overall)		176	12.7	.420	–	.649	3.9	.7	5.7

==== Playoffs ====
Year	Team	GP	MPG	FG%	FT%	RPG	APG	PPG
1970	Atlanta	6	7.0	.455	1.000	2.0	.3	5.7
