= Rick Weitzman =

American basketball player

Personal information
- Born: April 30, 1946 (age 80) Boston, Massachusetts, U.S.
- Listed height: 6 ft 2 in (1.88 m)
- Listed weight: 175 lb (79 kg)

Career information
- High school: Brookline (Brookline, Massachusetts)
- College: Northeastern (1964–1967)
- NBA draft: 1967: 10th round, 110th overall pick
- Drafted by: Boston Celtics
- Playing career: 1967–1968
- Position: Shooting guard
- Number: 26

Career history
- 1967–1968: Boston Celtics

Career highlights
- NBA champion (1968)
- Stats at NBA.com
- Stats at Basketball Reference

Richard L. Weitzman (born April 30, 1946) is an American former basketball player, scout, coach, and color commentator. He was a member of the Boston Celtics team that won the 1968 NBA Finals.

== Biography ==
Weitzman played high school basketball in Brookline, Massachusetts, then played college basketball for the Northeastern Huskies. He also played in the 1966 Pan American Maccabiah Games in Brazil, at which Team USA won a gold medal, with Barry Leibowitz, Dave Newmark, and Mark Turenshine, among others. He was selected by the Boston Celtics of the National Basketball Association (NBA) in the 1967 NBA draft.

A 6-foot-2-inch (1.88 m) shooting guard, Weitzman played one season (1967–68) in the NBA as a member of the Celtics. He averaged 1.3 points per game and won a championship ring when the Celtics defeated the Los Angeles Lakers in the 1968 NBA Finals. He scored the final two points in the sixth and final game of the championship series against the Lakers.

After being released by the Celtics, Weitzman later played about 20 games for the New Haven Elms of the Eastern Professional Basketball League during the 1968–69 season, and played for the North End team in the Boston Neighborhood Basketball Association (BNBA).

Weitzman went on to teach English at Peabody High School in Massachusetts for 13 years, and coached the school's basketball team during the 1970s. He spent two years as a color commentator for Celtics radio broadcasts in the early 1980s, working with Johnny Most. He also worked as a scout for the Celtics, where he spent 13 years and became the team's head scout, until being dismissed in 1997 when Rick Pitino was hired as head coach and general manager. Weitzman later had personnel roles with the Cleveland Cavaliers and Charlotte Bobcats. One of his final jobs before retiring was serving as an assistant basketball coach for the UMass Boston Beacons.

Weitzman has been inducted to the athletic halls of fame at Brookline and Peabody high schools and Northeastern University. He and his wife, Carol, have two daughters.

== Career statistics ==
Legend
GP	Games played	GS	Games started	MPG	Minutes per game
FG%	Field goal percentage	3P%	3-point field goal percentage	FT%	Free throw percentage
RPG	Rebounds per game	APG	Assists per game	SPG	Steals per game
BPG	Blocks per game	PPG	Points per game	**Bold**	Career high
†	Won an NBA championship

=== NBA ===
==== Regular season ====
Year	Team	GP	MPG	FG%	FT%	RPG	APG	PPG
1967–68†	Boston	25	3.0	.261	.692	.4	.3	1.3

==== Playoffs ====
Year	Team	GP	MPG	FG%	FT%	RPG	APG	PPG
1968†	Boston	3	1.7	.667	–	.3	.3	1.3
