= Barry Leibowitz =

American-Israeli basketball player

Barry Leibowitz בארי לייבוביץ
Personal information
- Born: September 10, 1945 (age 81) The Bronx, New York, U.S.
- Listed height: 6 ft 2 in (1.88 m)
- Listed weight: 180 lb (82 kg)

Career information
- High school: DeWitt Clinton (The Bronx, New York)
- College: LIU Brooklyn (1964–1967)
- NBA draft: 1967: 5th round, 48th overall pick
- Drafted by: New York Knicks
- Playing career: 1967–1982
- Position: Point guard / shooting guard
- Number: 25, 20, 40, 12

Career history

Playing
- 1967: Pittsburgh Pipers
- 1967–1968: New Jersey Americans
- 1968: Oakland Oaks
- 1968–1982: Hapoel Tel Aviv
- 1982–1985: Hapoel Haifa

Coaching
- 1968–1969: Hapoel Tel Aviv

Career highlights
- As player: All-American (1967); Israeli Basketball Premier League Player of the Year (1975); 4x Israeli Basketball Premier League All Star (1973, 1975–77); LIU Athletics Hall of Fame (2002); As head coach: Israeli Basketball Premier League champion (1969); Israeli Basketball State Cup winner (1969)
- Stats at Basketball Reference
Medals
Representing Israel
Men's basketball
European Championships
Silver medal – second place	1979 Italy	Israel
Maccabiah Games
Silver medal – second place	1977 Tel Aviv	Israel
Gold medal – first place	1973 Tel Aviv	Israel

Barry Leibowitz (בארי לייבוביץ; born September 10, 1945) is an American-Israeli former professional basketball player who played point guard and shooting guard. He played college basketball at Long Island University (LIU).

Chosen by the New York Knicks with the 48th overall pick of the 1967 NBA Draft, he instead played in the American Basketball Association for one season for the Pittsburgh Pipers, New Jersey Americans, and Oakland Oaks. Subsequently, he moved to Israel and played for Hapoel Tel Aviv and Hapoel Haifa of the Israeli Basketball Premier League for 17 seasons. In addition, he coached Hapoel Tel Aviv to an Israeli Basketball Premier League championship, and to an Israeli Basketball State Cup, both in the same season. He also played for the Israeli national team, of which he was captain, winning a silver medal at EuroBasket 1979 in Italy, a gold medal in the 1973 Maccabiah Games, and a silver medal in the 1977 Maccabiah Games. He was inducted into the LIU Athletics Hall of Fame in 2002.

== Early life ==
Leibowitz was born and raised in the Bronx in New York City, New York, and is Jewish. He graduated from DeWitt Clinton High School ('63) in the Bronx. There, he was a standout basketball player alongside future Hall of Famer Nate "Tiny" Archibald, and their team won the New York City PSAL championship in 1962–63. He was the first white basketball player to play in the Rucker Tournament in Harlem in Manhattan.

== College and Pan Am Maccabiah Games career ==
As a 6' 2" guard on scholarship at Long Island University in the Metropolitan Collegiate Conference, from 1964–67 Leibowitz scored a total of 1,032 points. He helped lead the LIU Blackbirds to a 60–18 record, three consecutive Tri-State League championships, and three straight NCAA College Division appearances. He was All-Met and All-Tri-State in 1966, co-captain of the team in 1966–67, and was named an All-American in 1967.

He played for the United States in the 1966 Pan American Maccabiah Games in São Paulo, Brazil, at which Team USA won a gold medal. Leibowitz played alongside, among others, Mark Turenshine and future NBA players Dave Newmark and Rick Weitzman.

== American Basketball Association career ==
After graduating from LIU in 1967, Leibowitz was selected by the New York Knicks in the fifth round (48th overall) of the 1967 NBA Draft, and by the Pittsburgh Pipers with the 12th pick in the ABA Draft (directly ahead of Clem Haskins). He chose to play for Pittsburgh in the new American Basketball Association.

Leibowitz played one season (1967–68) in the American Basketball Association (ABA) as a member of the Pittsburgh Pipers, New Jersey Americans, and Oakland Oaks. He was traded twice and played for three teams in the first four months of the season. Playing first for the Pipers alongside Connie Hawkins, who had played for the Harlem Globetrotters and asserted that in their travels he had become fluent in 50 to 60 languages, Leibowitz quipped: "He learned one word in every country, so he thought he was fluent in fifty to sixty languages. And nobody was going to argue with him."

Leibowitz was traded by the Pittsburgh Pipers to the New Jersey Americans (now the Brooklyn Nets in the NBA) for Art Heyman (the first overall pick in the first round of the 1963 NBA draft) in December 1967; the Miami News called it "one of the few straight-Jewish-player trades in sports history." Two months later, Leibowitz was traded again, this time to the Oakland Oaks (for Levern "Jelly" Tart, who was leading the league in scoring at the time), with whom he finished the year. In 82 games, he averaged 10.9 points and 3.7 assists per game, while shooting 80.5% from the free throw line (11th in the ABA). He was 5th in the ABA in assists (301).

== Israeli professional career ==
=== Hapoel Tel Aviv and Hapoel Haifa ===
In June 1968 before the start of the 1968–69 season, the Oakland Oaks sought to send Leibowitz to the New Orleans Buccaneers in a trade for point guard Larry Brown and small forward Doug Moe, and he was signed to a two-year contract for $11,000 ($102,000 in current dollar terms) a season. The Buccaneers then traded him with that contract to the Utah Jazz.

During that off-season, however, Leibowitz decided against playing for a fourth team in the ABA. During his summer vacation he took a trip to the Greek islands, after which he dropped by for a three-day visit with his college teammate Ivan Leshinsky and his friend Mark Turenshine who were playing basketball in Israel. Unexpectedly, he ended up signing to play in Israel as well, instead of returning to the U.S. He spoke to his new coach in the U.S., who told him that it was a shame, but that if Israel did not work out for him "then come, you have a place." So he said to himself: "What do I have to lose? I'll try it for a year and if it doesn't work out, I'll come back." He later said that he stayed in Israel because of its sea, hummus, and tahini with olive oil.

Leibowitz played professionally in Israel for Hapoel Tel Aviv of the Israeli Basketball Premier League, with whom his first salary was 600 Israeli pounds ($170 ($1,600 in current dollar terms)) per month. He played for the team from 1968 until 1982, with a short break from playing. He was temporarily banned by FIBA from playing because he was not an amateur, having played one season in the ABA, and he instead became the team’s coach for a time. He coached the team to the Israeli Basketball Premier League and Israeli Basketball State Cup double in 1968–69. He then returned strictly as a player. In 1976, Leibowitz scored 51 points in a Korac Cup game against Spain's FC Barcelona Bàsquet, although Hapoel Tel Aviv lost 117–126. His high-scoring season was 1979, when he averaged 22.6 points per game. He was named the Israeli Basketball Premier League Player of the Year in 1975, and a Premier League All Star in 1973 and 1975, 1976, and 1977. From 1982 to 1985 he played for Hapoel Haifa. In 1985, at 40 years of age, he retired from basketball.

== Israeli national team and Maccabiah Games career ==
Leibowitz was the captain of Israeli national team that won the silver medal at EuroBasket 1979 in Italy. He also played for it in the 1973, 1975, 1977, and 1981 European championships.

He played basketball in the 1973 Maccabiah Games. There, he won a gold medal with Team Israel alongside Tal Brody and Mickey Berkowitz. He also played for Team Israel in the 1977 Maccabiah Games, winning a silver medal.

== Hall of Fame ==
In 2002, Leibowitz was inducted into the LIU Athletics Hall of Fame.

== Personal ==
While in Israel, Leibowitz married an Israeli woman, and made aliyah by immigrating to Israel. In 2002, he was working as a children's basketball coach, but his main profession was as a high school teacher of physiology and anatomy. He later lived in Plantation, Florida, and Fort Lauderdale, Florida. He has a daughter, Alona, who lives in Israel, is married to Israeli coach and former basketball player Yehu Orland, and has a son named Omri.
