= Tom Sherak =

American film producer (1945–2014)

- Born: June 22, 1945; Brooklyn, New York, U.S.
- Died: January 28, 2014 (aged 68); Calabasas, California, U.S.
- Occupation: Producer

Thomas Mitchell Sherak (June 22, 1945 – January 28, 2014) was an American film producer who was president of the Academy of Motion Picture Arts and Sciences.

== Biography ==
Sherak was born in Brooklyn and studied at New York City Community College where he earned a degree in marketing. He joined Paramount Pictures in 1970 working in distribution offices in New York, Washington, D.C., and St Louis. He became vice president and head film buyer at General Cinema and then moved to 20th Century Fox in 1983, serving as president of domestic distribution before becoming chairman of their domestic group. He oversaw the release of Aliens (1986), Die Hard (1988), Home Alone (1990), Mrs. Doubtfire (1993) and Independence Day (1996).

In 2000, he joined Revolution Studios and oversaw the release of 30 films in seven years, including The One, for which he was executive producer, and Black Hawk Down (both 2001).

In 2003, he became one of the Board of Governors of the executives branch of the Academy of Motion Picture Arts and Sciences and in 2009 he became Academy President and served the maximum three terms. He was succeeded by Hawk Koch in 2012. On September 26, 2013, Los Angeles Mayor Eric Garcetti appointed Tom Sherak as director of the newly created Mayor's Entertainment Industry and Production Office.

He appeared as an actor in an episode of NYPD Blue and in the film Columbus Circle (2012).

He was married to Madeleine and had three children, Barbra, Melissa and William.

He served as chairman of the MS Dinner of Champions for two decades, helping raise millions of dollars for multiple sclerosis research, an illness that his daughter Melissa had. He received the Public Leadership in Neurology Award in 2011 from the American Academy of Neurology. He was also chairman of the Will Rogers Motion Pictures Pioneer Foundation and served on the board of the Motion Picture & Television Fund and Variety, the Children's Charity of Southern California.

Sherak died on January 28, 2014, in Calabasas, California, of prostate cancer. He was 68 and is buried at Mount Sinai Simi Valley. He was posthumously awarded a star on the Hollywood Walk of Fame at 6910 Hollywood Blvd.

Non-profit organization positions
Preceded by Sid Ganis	President of the Academy of Motion Picture Arts and Sciences; 2009–2012	Succeeded by Hawk Koch
