= Rich Peek =

American basketball player

Personal information
- Born: October 28, 1943 Miami, Florida, U.S.
- Died: February 16, 2014 (aged 70) Tyler, Texas, U.S.
- Listed height: 6 ft 11 in (2.11 m)
- Listed weight: 230 lb (104 kg)

Career information
- High school: Escambia (Pensacola, Florida)
- College: Florida (1963–1964); Louisiana Tech (1965–1967)
- NBA draft: 1967: 15th round, 148th overall pick
- Drafted by: Baltimore Bullets
- Position: Center
- Number: 33

Career history
- 1967–1968: Dallas Chaparrals

Career highlights
- 2× All-Gulf States Conference (1966, 1967)
- Stats at Basketball Reference

Richard Shelby Peek (October 28, 1943 – February 16, 2014) was an American professional basketball player. Although he was drafted by the NBA's Baltimore Bullets in 1967, Peek played in the American Basketball Association (ABA) for the Dallas Chaparrals. In 51 career games, he averaged 4.6 points and 3.9 rebounds per game.
