= Brooklyn Nets all-time roster =

The following is a list of players, both past and current, who appeared at least in one game for the Brooklyn Nets (2012–present), New Jersey Nets (1977–2012), or New York Nets (1976–1977) NBA franchise.

== Players ==
Note: Statistics are correct through the end of the 2025–26 season.

G	Guard	G/F	Guard-forward	F	Forward	F/C	Forward-center	C	Center

legend
^	Denotes player who has been inducted to the Naismith Memorial Basketball Hall of Fame
*	Denotes player who has been selected for at least one All-Star Game with the Brooklyn Nets and is currently on the team roster
^{+}	Denotes player who has been selected for at least one All-Star Game with the Brooklyn Nets
^{x}	Denotes player who is currently on the Brooklyn Nets roster
0.0	Denotes the Brooklyn Nets statistics leader (min. 100 games played for the team for per-game statistics)
player	Denotes player who has played for the Brooklyn Nets in the ABA

=== A ===
All-time roster
Player	Pos.	Pre-draft team	Yrs	Seasons	Statistics									Ref.
Player	Pos.	Pre-draft team	Yrs	Seasons	GP	MP	REB	AST	PTS	MPG	RPG	APG	PPG	Ref.
Quincy Acy	F	Baylor	2	2016–2018	102	1,869	364	75	620	18.3	3.6	0.7	6.1	
Hassan Adams	G	Arizona	1	2006–2007	61	495	77	13	174	8.1	1.3	0.2	2.9	
Rafael Addison	F	Syracuse	2	1991–1993	144	2,339	297	121	872	16.2	2.1	0.8	6.1	
Ochai Agbaji^{x}	G	Kansas	1	2025–2026	20	323	46	17	133	16.2	2.3	0.9	6.7	
Maurice Ager	G	Michigan State	2	2007–2009	34	185	19	7	70	5.4	0.6	0.2	2.1	
LaMarcus Aldridge	F/C	Texas	2	2020–2022	52	1,180	282	55	671	22.7	5.4	1.1	12.9	
Jarrett Allen	C	Texas	4	2017–2021	234	5,709	1,856	289	2,369	24.4	7.9	1.2	10.1	
Malik Allen	F	Villanova	1	2007–2008	48	763	128	29	261	15.9	2.7	0.6	5.4	
Rafer Alston	G	Fresno State	1	2009–2010	27	766	75	104	262	28.4	2.8	3.9	9.7	
Alan Anderson	G/F	Michigan State	2	2013–2015	152	3,517	379	164	1,109	23.1	2.5	1.1	7.3	
Cadillac Anderson	F	Houston	1	1990–1991	1	18	6	1	8	18.0	6.0	1.0	8.0	
Dan Anderson	C	Augsburg	2	1967–1969	103	3,303	1,073	126	1,426	32.1	10.4	1.2	13.8	
Justin Anderson	G/F	Virginia	1	2019–2020	10	107	21	8	28	10.7	2.1	0.8	2.8	
Kenny Anderson^{+}	G	Georgia Tech	5	1991–1996	304	9,962	1,026	2,363	4,655	32.8	3.4	7.8	15.3	
Ron Anderson	F	Fresno State	1	1993–1994	11	176	26	6	44	16.0	2.4	0.5	4.0	
Ryan Anderson	F	California	1	2008–2009	66	1,312	311	52	487	19.9	4.7	0.8	7.4	
Nate Archibald^	G	UTEP	1	1976–1977	34	1,277	80	254	697	37.6	2.4	7.5	20.5	
Jim Ard	C	Cincinnati	3	1970–1973	186	2,598	853	88	964	14.0	4.6	0.5	5.2	
Brandon Armstrong	G	Pepperdine	3	2001–2004	108	699	63	24	239	6.5	0.6	0.2	2.2	
Darrell Armstrong	G	Fayetteville State	1	2007–2008	50	549	67	73	123	11.0	1.3	1.5	2.5	
Bob Arnzen	F	Notre Dame	1	1969–1970	13	98	22	5	40	7.5	1.7	0.4	3.1	
Vincent Askew	G	Memphis	1	1996–1997	1	7	0	0	0	7.0	0.0	0.0	0.0	
John Austin	G	Boston College	1	1967–1968	41	692	64	58	317	16.9	1.6	1.4	7.7	
Bird Averitt	G	Pepperdine	1	1977–1978	21	409	33	68	174	19.5	1.6	3.2	8.3	

=== B ===
All-time roster
Player	Pos.	Pre-draft team	Yrs	Seasons	Statistics									Ref.
Player	Pos.	Pre-draft team	Yrs	Seasons	GP	MP	REB	AST	PTS	MPG	RPG	APG	PPG	Ref.
John Bagley	G	Boston College	2	1987–1989	150	4,416	401	870	1,481	29.4	2.7	5.8	9.9	
James Bailey	F	Rutgers	3	1981–1983; 1986–1987	107	1,880	486	74	895	17.6	4.5	0.7	8.4	
Mike Bantom	F	Saint Joseph's	1	1976–1977	33	1,114	285	50	614	33.8	8.6	1.5	18.6	
Andrea Bargnani	F/C	(Italy) Benetton Treviso	1	2015–2016	46	634	97	18	304	13.8	2.1	0.4	6.6	
Rick Barry^	F	Miami (FL)	2	1970–1972	139	6,118	1,003	621	4,252	44.0	7.2	4.5	30.6	
Tim Bassett	F	Georgia	5	1975–1980	314	7,306	2,012	340	1,785	23.3	6.4	1.1	5.7	
Keita Bates-Diop	F	Ohio State	1	2023–2024	14	68	9	4	23	4.9	0.6	0.3	1.6	
Tony Battie	F/C	Texas Tech	1	2009–2010	15	134	23	3	36	8.9	1.5	0.2	2.4	
Johnny Baum	F	Temple	2	1971–1973	119	1,622	336	48	796	13.6	2.8	0.4	6.7	
Al Beard	C	Norfolk State	1	1967–1968	12	118	46	0	30	9.8	3.8	0.0	2.5	
Arthur Becker	F	Arizona State	1	1972–1973	8	46	6	1	23	5.8	0.8	0.1	2.9	
Reece Beekman	G	Virginia	1	2024–2025	34	465	38	62	91	13.7	1.1	1.8	2.7	
DeAndre' Bembry	G/F	Saint Joseph's	1	2021–2022	48	949	152	60	278	19.8	3.2	1.3	5.8	
Benoit Benjamin	C	Creighton	2	1993–1995	138	3,415	939	82	1,393	24.7	6.8	0.6	10.1	
Anthony Bennett	F	UNLV	1	2016–2017	23	264	78	12	115	11.5	3.4	0.5	5.0	
David Benoit	F	Alabama	1	1997–1998	53	799	141	17	282	15.1	2.7	0.3	5.3	
Walter Berry	F	St. John's	1	1988–1989	29	556	115	20	259	19.2	4.0	0.7	8.9	
Travis Best	G	Georgia Tech	1	2004–2005	76	1,461	107	143	514	19.2	1.4	1.9	6.8	
Otis Birdsong^{+}	G	Houston	7	1981–1988	375	11,324	941	1,361	5,968	30.2	2.5	3.6	15.9	
Andray Blatche	F	South Kent School (CT)	2	2012–2014	155	3,173	807	197	1,664	20.5	5.2	1.3	10.7	
Mookie Blaylock	G	Oklahoma	3	1989–1992	194	6,400	658	1,143	2,518	33.0	3.4	5.9	13.0	
Keith Bogans	G/F	Kentucky	2	2011–2013	79	1,502	131	79	332	19.0	1.7	1.0	4.2	
Bojan Bogdanović	F	(Turkey) Fenerbahçe Ülker	3	2014–2017	212	5,451	665	257	2,370	25.7	3.1	1.2	11.2	
Trevor Booker	F	Clemson	2	2016–2018	89	2,149	690	176	890	24.1	7.8	2.0	10.0	
Josh Boone	F/C	UConn	4	2006–2010	256	4,482	1,258	125	1,340	17.5	4.9	0.5	5.2	
Tom Bowens	F	Grambling State	1	1968–1969	76	1,550	455	52	455	20.4	6.0	0.7	6.0	
Sam Bowie	C	Kentucky	4	1989–1993	280	8,394	2,304	551	3,578	30.0	8.2	2.0	12.8	
Earl Boykins	G	Eastern Michigan	1	1998–1999	5	51	4	6	21	10.2	0.8	1.2	4.2	
Winford Boynes	G	San Francisco	2	1978–1980	133	2,278	288	170	1,191	17.1	2.2	1.3	9.0	
Dudley Bradley	G	North Carolina	1	1987–1988	63	1,432	126	150	423	22.7	2.0	2.4	6.7	
Shawn Bradley	C	BYU	2	1995–1997	107	3,223	857	75	1,318	30.1	8.0	0.7	12.3	
Adrian Branch	F	Maryland	1	1987–1988	20	308	48	16	133	15.4	2.4	0.8	6.7	
Ron Brewer	G	Arkansas	1	1984–1985	11	245	18	11	114	22.3	1.6	1.0	10.4	
Mikal Bridges	G/F	Villanova	2	2022–2024	109	3,777	493	371	2,312	34.7	4.5	3.4	21.2	
Armoni Brooks	G	Houston	1	2023–2024	10	104	18	5	42	10.4	1.8	0.5	4.2	
MarShon Brooks	G	Providence	2	2011–2013	129	2,560	304	207	1,102	19.8	2.4	1.6	8.5	
Bruce Brown	G/F	Miami (FL)	2	2020–2022	137	3,225	694	252	1,220	23.5	5.1	1.8	8.9	
Chucky Brown	F	NC State	1	1992–1993	77	1,186	232	51	391	15.4	3.0	0.7	5.1	
Damone Brown	F	Syracuse	1	2003–2004	3	17	5	0	3	5.7	1.7	0.0	1.0	
Markel Brown	G	Oklahoma State	2	2014–2016	109	1,763	229	130	579	16.2	2.1	1.2	5.3	
Moses Brown	C	UCLA	1	2022–2023	2	6	0	0	0	3.0	0.0	0.0	0.0	
P. J. Brown	F/C	Louisiana Tech	3	1993–1996	240	7,358	1,540	393	2,016	30.7	6.4	1.6	8.4	
Tony Brown	G/F	Arkansas	1	1986–1987	77	2,339	219	259	873	30.4	2.8	3.4	11.3	
Stanley Brundy	F	DePaul	1	1989–1990	16	128	26	3	37	8.0	1.6	0.2	2.3	
George Bruns	G	Manhattan	1	1972–1973	13	236	8	36	86	18.2	0.6	2.8	6.6	
George Bucci	G	Manhattan	1	1975–1976	33	237	37	15	128	7.2	1.1	0.5	3.9	
Jud Buechler	F	Arizona	2	1990–1992	76	888	143	53	240	11.7	1.9	0.7	3.2	
Rodney Buford	G/F	Creighton	1	2004–2005	64	1,313	189	63	445	20.5	3.0	1.0	7.0	
Bill Bunting	F	North Carolina	1	1970–1971	39	687	142	34	190	17.6	3.6	0.9	4.9	
David Burns	G	Saint Louis	1	1981–1982	3	34	2	4	7	11.3	0.7	1.3	2.3	
Scott Burrell	F	UConn	2	1998–2000	106	2,042	375	117	663	19.3	3.5	1.1	6.3	

=== C ===
All-time roster
Player	Pos.	Pre-draft team	Yrs	Seasons	Statistics									Ref.
Player	Pos.	Pre-draft team	Yrs	Seasons	GP	MP	REB	AST	PTS	MPG	RPG	APG	PPG	Ref.
Michael Cage	C	San Diego State	2	1997–1998; 1999–2000	99	1,443	389	41	133	14.6	3.9	0.4	1.3	
Adrian Caldwell	F	Lamar	1	1996–1997	18	204	56	5	29	11.3	3.1	0.3	1.6	
Jim Caldwell	C	Georgia Tech	1	1967–1968	12	261	85	11	56	21.8	7.1	0.9	4.7	
Elden Campbell	C	Clemson	1	2004–2005	10	50	11	3	2	5.0	1.1	0.3	0.2	
Rick Carlisle	G	Virginia	1	1989–1990	5	21	0	5	2	4.2	0.0	1.0	0.4	
Chris Carr	G	Southern Illinois	1	1998–1999	28	364	59	16	184	13.0	2.1	0.6	6.6	
Bob Carrington	G	Boston College	1	1977–1978	37	1,032	112	55	386	27.9	3.0	1.5	10.4	
DeMarre Carroll	F	Missouri	2	2017–2019	140	3,883	828	232	1,727	27.7	5.9	1.7	12.3	
Joe Barry Carroll	C	Purdue	2	1988–1990	110	2,998	723	148	1,305	27.3	6.6	1.3	11.9	
George Carter	F	St. Bonaventure	1	1972–1973	83	2,976	515	173	1,578	35.9	6.2	2.1	19.0	
Jevon Carter	G	West Virginia	1	2021–2022	46	552	67	46	165	12.0	1.5	1.0	3.6	
Vince Carter^	G/F	North Carolina	5	2004–2009	374	14,157	2,152	1,762	8,834	37.9	5.8	4.7	23.6	
Sam Cassell	G	Florida State	3	1996–1999	102	3,483	316	771	1,988	34.1	3.1	7.6	19.5	
Harvey Catchings	C	Hardin-Simmons	1	1978–1979	32	659	204	30	195	20.6	6.4	0.9	6.1	
Bobby Cattage	F	Auburn	1	1985–1986	29	185	34	4	92	6.4	1.2	0.1	3.2	
Ron Cavenall	C	Texas Southern	1	1988–1989	5	16	2	0	6	3.2	0.4	0.0	1.2	
Wilson Chandler	F	DePaul	1	2019–2020	35	734	145	39	205	21.0	4.1	1.1	5.9	
Maurice Cheeks^	G	West Texas A&M	1	1992–1993	35	510	42	107	126	14.6	1.2	3.1	3.6	
Josh Childress	G/F	Stanford	1	2012–2013	14	100	15	5	14	7.1	1.1	0.4	1.0	
Chris Childs	G	Boise State	3	1994–1996; 2002–2003	143	3,535	319	783	1,325	24.7	2.2	5.5	9.3	
Chris Chiozza	G	Iowa	2	2019–2021	40	510	62	120	203	12.8	1.6	3.0	5.1	
Jim Chones	F/C	Marquette	1	1972–1973	82	2,153	586	95	932	26.3	7.1	1.2	11.4	
Bob Christian	C	Grambling State	1	1969–1970	1	4	2	0	2	4.0	2.0	0.0	2.0	
Steve Chubin	G	Rhode Island	2	1968–1970	39	1,060	138	165	564	27.2	3.5	4.2	14.5	
Earl Clark	F	Louisville	1	2014–2015	10	93	23	3	27	9.3	2.3	0.3	2.7	
Nic Claxton^{x}	C	Georgia	7	2019–2026	380	9,944	2,875	788	4,024	26.2	7.6	2.1	10.6	
Noah Clowney^{x}	F	Alabama	3	2023–2026	135	3,192	535	166	1,362	23.6	4.0	1.2	10.1	
Ben Coleman	F	Maryland	2	1986–1988	95	1,686	461	76	749	17.7	4.9	0.8	7.9	
Derrick Coleman^{+}	F	Syracuse	5	1990–1995	348	12,449	3,690	1,093	6,930	35.8	10.6	3.1	19.9	
Jason Collins	C	Stanford	8	2001–2008; 2013–2014	532	12,664	2,323	565	2,292	23.8	4.4	1.1	4.3	
Dallas Comegys	F	DePaul	1	1987–1988	75	1,122	218	65	418	15.0	2.9	0.9	5.6	
Jeff Congdon	G	BYU	1	1970–1971	42	579	54	97	160	13.8	1.3	2.3	3.8	
Lester Conner	G	Oregon State	3	1988–1991	199	5,376	677	1,047	1,636	27.0	3.4	5.3	8.2	
Darwin Cook	G	Portland	6	1980–1986	464	11,593	1,056	1,970	4,699	25.0	2.3	4.2	10.1	
Tyler Cook	F	Iowa	1	2020–2021	4	17	2	2	2	4.3	0.5	0.5	0.5	
Joe Cooper	C	Colorado	1	1981–1982	1	11	2	0	2	11.0	2.0	0.0	2.0	
Allen Crabbe	G	California	2	2017–2019	118	3,330	472	163	1,403	28.2	4.0	1.4	11.9	
Jamal Crawford	G	Michigan	1	2019–2020	1	6	0	3	5	6.0	0.0	3.0	5.0	
Mitch Creek	G	Australia	1	2018–2019	4	36	10	5	15	9.0	2.5	1.3	3.8	
Mark Crow	F	Duke	1	1977–1978	15	154	27	8	84	10.3	1.8	0.5	5.6	
Cui Yongxi	G	(China) Guangzhou	1	2024–2025	5	10	2	0	3	2.0	0.4	0.0	0.6	
Dante Cunningham	F	Villanova	1	2017–2018	22	447	105	22	164	20.3	4.8	1.0	7.5	
William Cunningham	C	Temple	1	1998–1999	15	161	28	1	6	10.7	1.9	0.1	0.4	
Seth Curry	G	Duke	2	2021–2023	80	1,780	149	148	845	22.3	1.9	1.9	10.6	

=== D ===
All-time roster
Player	Pos.	Pre-draft team	Yrs	Seasons	Statistics									Ref.
Player	Pos.	Pre-draft team	Yrs	Seasons	GP	MP	REB	AST	PTS	MPG	RPG	APG	PPG	Ref.
Lloyd Daniels	G	Mt. SAC	1	1996–1997	17	282	39	25	92	16.6	2.3	1.5	5.4	
Mel Daniels^	C	New Mexico	1	1976–1977	11	126	34	6	39	11.5	3.1	0.5	3.5	
Ollie Darden	F	Michigan	1	1968–1969	30	726	214	42	344	24.2	7.1	1.4	11.5	
Yinka Dare	C	George Washington	4	1994–1998	110	1,002	281	4	233	9.1	2.6	0.0	2.1	
Brandon Davies	F	BYU	1	2014–2015	7	44	10	2	16	6.3	1.4	0.3	2.3	
Ed Davis	F	North Carolina	1	2018–2019	81	1,446	694	61	472	17.9	8.6	0.8	5.8	
Hubert Davis	G	North Carolina	1	2003–2004	14	55	8	3	4	3.9	0.6	0.2	0.3	
Mel Davis	F	St. John's	1	1976–1977	34	752	193	47	296	22.1	5.7	1.4	8.7	
Darryl Dawkins	C	Maynard Evans HS (FL)	5	1982–1987	258	6,795	1,412	361	3,687	26.3	5.5	1.4	14.3	
Billy DeAngelis	G	Saint Joseph's	1	1970–1971	8	47	6	8	10	5.9	0.8	1.0	1.3	
Egor Dëmin^{x}	G	BYU	1	2025–2026	52	1,308	165	173	536	25.2	3.2	3.3	10.3	
Joe DePre	G	St. John's	3	1970–1973	119	2,281	226	185	830	19.2	1.9	1.6	7.0	
Derrick Dial	G	Eastern Michigan	1	2001–2002	25	249	45	31	73	10.0	1.8	1.2	2.9	
Kaniel Dickens	F	Idaho	1	2004–2005	11	61	9	1	13	5.5	0.8	0.1	1.2	
Spencer Dinwiddie	G	Colorado	7	2016–2021; 2022–2024	348	10,003	1,088	1,985	4,953	28.7	3.1	5.7	14.2	
DeSagana Diop	C	Oak Hill Academy (VA)	1	2007–2008	27	401	122	14	68	14.9	4.5	0.5	2.5	
Keyon Dooling	G	Missouri	2	2008–2010	130	3,045	209	405	1,112	23.4	1.6	3.1	8.6	
Sherman Douglas	G	Syracuse	3	1997–1998; 1999–2001	159	3,102	238	497	1,097	19.5	1.5	3.1	6.9	
Chris Douglas-Roberts	G	Memphis	2	2008–2010	111	2,315	248	145	873	20.9	2.2	1.3	7.9	
Sonny Dove	F	St. John's	3	1969–1972	165	4,573	1,220	196	2,284	27.7	7.4	1.2	13.8	
Milton Doyle	G	Loyola (IL)	1	2017–2018	10	125	18	10	34	12.5	1.8	1.0	3.4	
Joshua Dowling^{x}	G	Hampton	1	2025–2026	4	22	3	17	16	5.5	0.75	4.2	4.0	
Goran Dragić	G	(Slovenia) Union Olimpija	1	2021–2022	16	408	51	77	117	25.5	3.2	4.8	7.3	
Andre Drummond	C	UConn	1	2021–2022	24	535	247	34	282	22.3	10.3	1.4	11.8	
Chris Dudley	C	Yale	4	1989–1993	241	5,532	1,983	130	1,305	23.0	8.2	0.5	5.4	
Jared Dudley	F	Boston College	1	2018–2019	59	1,220	155	83	287	20.7	2.6	1.4	4.9	
David Duke Jr.	G	Providence	2	2021–2023	45	569	96	38	189	12.6	2.1	0.8	4.2	
Kevin Durant^{+}	F	Texas	3	2020–2023	129	4,607	916	753	3,744	35.7	7.1	5.8	29.0	
Jarrett Durham	F	Duquesne	1	1971–1972	1	1	0	0	0	1.0	0.0	0.0	0.0	

=== E to F ===
All-time roster
Player	Pos.	Pre-draft team	Yrs	Seasons	Statistics									Ref.
Player	Pos.	Pre-draft team	Yrs	Seasons	GP	MP	REB	AST	PTS	MPG	RPG	APG	PPG	Ref.
Jim Eakins	C	BYU	1	1975–1976	34	463	120	18	211	13.6	3.5	0.5	6.2	
Kessler Edwards	F	Pepperdine	2	2021–2023	62	1,066	186	33	299	17.2	3.0	0.5	4.8	
Kevin Edwards	G	DePaul	5	1993–1998	189	5,029	470	413	2,015	26.6	2.5	2.2	10.7	
Henry Ellenson	F/C	Marquette	1	2019–2020	5	15	6	1	2	3.0	1.2	0.2	0.4	
Wayne Ellington	G	North Carolina	1	2015–2016	76	1,615	174	83	586	21.3	2.3	1.1	7.7	
Bob Elliott	F/C	Arizona	3	1978–1981	141	2,324	502	204	980	16.5	3.6	1.4	7.0	
Len Elmore	F/C	Maryland	2	1981–1983	155	3,075	679	139	983	19.8	4.4	0.9	6.3	
Andre Emmett	F	Texas Tech	1	2011–2012	6	45	6	1	13	7.5	1.0	0.2	2.2	
Chris Engler	C	Wyoming	3	1984–1985; 1986–1988	79	605	158	19	162	7.7	2.0	0.2	2.1	
James Ennis III	F	Long Beach State	1	2021–2022	2	14	5	0	5	7.0	2.5	0.0	2.5	
Julius Erving^ (#32)	F	UMass	3	1973–1976	252	10,044	2,738	1,319	7,104	39.9	10.9	5.2	28.2	
Evan Eschmeyer	C	Northwestern	2	1999–2001	105	1,704	474	61	342	16.2	4.5	0.6	3.3	
Tyson Etienne^{x}	G	Wichita State	2	2024–2026	31	531	36	52	244	17.1	1.2	1.7	7.9	
Billy Evans	G	Boston College	1	1969–1970	53	602	39	100	102	11.4	0.7	1.9	1.9	
Brian Evans	F	Indiana	2	1997–1999	39	453	69	38	145	11.6	1.8	1.0	3.7	
Reggie Evans	F	Iowa	2	2012–2014	110	2,366	1,037	48	444	21.5	9.4	0.4	4.0	
Tosan Evbuomwan	F	Princeton	1	2024–2025	28	665	120	55	267	23.8	4.3	2.0	9.5	
Kenneth Faried	F	Morehead State	1	2018–2019	12	118	44	2	61	9.8	3.7	0.2	5.1	
Jordan Farmar	G	UCLA	2	2010–2012	112	2,627	234	497	1,107	23.5	2.1	4.4	9.9	
Derrick Favors	F	Georgia Tech	1	2010–2011	56	1,091	297	21	353	19.5	5.3	0.4	6.3	
Jamie Feick	C	Michigan State	3	1998–2001	113	3,239	1,097	97	658	28.7	9.7	0.9	5.8	
Dave Feitl	C	UTEP	1	1991–1992	34	175	61	6	82	5.1	1.8	0.2	2.4	
Yogi Ferrell	G	Indiana	1	2016–2017	10	151	12	17	54	15.1	1.2	1.7	5.4	
Dorian Finney-Smith	F	Florida	3	2022–2025	114	3,235	536	179	974	29.0	4.9	1.6	10.4	
Vern Fleming	G	Georgia	1	1995–1996	77	1,747	170	255	590	22.7	2.2	3.3	7.7	
Sleepy Floyd	G	Georgetown	2	1982–1983; 1994–1995	91	1,325	96	193	423	14.6	1.1	2.1	4.6	
Phil Ford	G	North Carolina	1	1982–1983	7	163	7	38	47	23.3	1.0	5.4	6.7	
Jim Fox	C	South Carolina	1	1976–1977	71	1,165	329	49	463	16.4	4.6	0.7	6.5	
Randy Foye	G	Villanova	1	2016–2017	69	1,284	155	135	357	18.6	2.2	2.0	5.2	
Wilbert Frazier	F/C	Grambling State	1	1968–1969	75	1,370	416	66	554	18.3	5.5	0.9	7.4	

=== G ===
All-time roster
Player	Pos.	Pre-draft team	Yrs	Seasons	Statistics									Ref.
Player	Pos.	Pre-draft team	Yrs	Seasons	GP	MP	REB	AST	PTS	MPG	RPG	APG	PPG	Ref.
Wenyen Gabriel	F	Kentucky	1	2021–2022	1	1	1	0	0	1.0	1.0	0.0	0.0	
Dan Gadzuric	C	UCLA	1	2010–2011	14	166	49	3	39	11.9	3.5	0.2	2.8	
Corey Gaines	G	Loyola Marymount	1	1988–1989	32	337	19	67	67	10.5	0.6	2.1	2.1	
Sundiata Gaines	G	Georgia	2	2010–2012	67	939	132	151	346	14.0	2.0	2.3	5.2	
Mike Gale	G	Elizabeth City State	2	1973–1975	104	2,528	388	289	792	24.3	3.7	2.8	7.6	
Langston Galloway	G	Saint Joseph's	1	2021–2022	4	58	8	5	12	14.5	2.0	1.3	3.0	
Kevin Garnett^	F/C	Farragut Academy (IL)	2	2013–2015	96	1,963	643	151	637	20.4	6.7	1.6	6.6	
Chris Gatling	F/C	Old Dominion	3	1996–1999	78	1,732	421	68	791	22.2	5.4	0.9	10.1	
Tate George	G	UConn	3	1990–1993	174	2,011	179	325	732	11.6	1.0	1.9	4.2	
Derrick Gervin	F	UTSA	2	1989–1991	77	1,082	175	38	676	14.1	2.3	0.5	8.8	
Harry Giles III	C	Duke	1	2023–2024	16	81	26	6	54	5.1	1.6	0.4	3.4	
Eddie Gill	G	Weber State	2	2000–2001; 2007–2008	21	301	31	45	77	14.3	1.5	2.1	3.7	
Kendall Gill	G	Illinois	6	1995–2001	331	11,203	1,591	981	4,932	33.8	4.8	3.0	14.9	
Jack Gillespie	F	Montana State	1	1969–1970	2	27	7	0	2	13.5	3.5	0.0	1.0	
Armen Gilliam	F	UNLV	3	1993–1996	242	7,297	1,826	308	3,611	30.2	7.5	1.3	14.9	
Jacob Gilyard	G	Richmond	1	2023–2024	4	45	3	6	0	11.3	0.8	1.5	0.0	
Gerald Glass	F	Ole Miss	1	1995–1996	10	56	6	4	21	5.6	0.6	0.4	2.1	
Mike Gminski	C	Duke	8	1980–1988	550	13,638	3,671	711	6,415	24.8	6.7	1.3	11.7	
Anthony Goldwire	G	Houston	1	2003–2004	6	19	1	1	4	3.2	0.2	0.2	0.7	
Steve Goodrich	F	Princeton	1	2001–2002	9	50	5	5	5	5.6	0.6	0.6	0.6	
Archie Goodwin	G	Kentucky	1	2016–2017	12	184	28	23	95	15.3	2.3	1.9	7.9	
Greg Graham	G	Indiana	1	1995–1996	45	485	42	41	184	10.8	0.9	0.9	4.1	
Stephen Graham	G	Oklahoma State	1	2010–2011	59	959	123	40	198	16.3	2.1	0.7	3.4	
Treveon Graham	G	VCU	1	2018–2019	35	715	107	34	184	20.4	3.1	1.0	5.3	
Evric Gray	F	UNLV	1	1996–1997	5	42	3	2	13	8.4	0.6	0.4	2.6	
RaiQuan Gray	F	Florida State	1	2022–2023	1	35	9	7	16	35.0	9.0	7.0	16.0	
Bob Greacen	F	Rutgers	1	1971–1972	4	20	2	1	2	5.0	0.5	0.3	0.5	
Gerald Green	G/F	Gulf Shores Academy (TX)	1	2011–2012	31	781	108	34	400	25.2	3.5	1.1	12.9	
Jeff Green	F	Georgetown	1	2020–2021	68	1,835	263	108	750	27.0	3.9	1.6	11.0	
Luther Green	F	LIU Brooklyn	2	1969–1971	85	903	318	30	381	10.6	3.7	0.4	4.5	
Orien Greene	G	Louisiana	1	2010–2011	3	5	0	1	3	1.7	0.0	0.3	1.0	
Gary Gregor	F	South Carolina	2	1972–1974	65	908	221	46	322	14.0	3.4	0.7	5.0	
Dennis Grey	C	Alliant International	1	1969–1970	4	74	25	0	18	18.5	6.3	0.0	4.5	
Blake Griffin	F	Oklahoma	2	2020–2022	82	1,518	349	168	619	18.5	4.3	2.0	7.5	
Jorge Gutiérrez	G	California	2	2013–2015	25	288	29	37	78	11.5	1.2	1.5	3.1	

=== H ===
All-time roster
Player	Pos.	Pre-draft team	Yrs	Seasons	Statistics									Ref.
Player	Pos.	Pre-draft team	Yrs	Seasons	GP	MP	REB	AST	PTS	MPG	RPG	APG	PPG	Ref.
Rudy Hackett	F	Syracuse	1	1976–1977	1	8	3	0	2	8.0	3.0	0.0	2.0	
Jack Haley	F/C	UCLA	4	1989–1991; 1996–1998	170	2,329	685	58	832	13.7	4.0	0.3	4.9	
Donta Hall	C	Alabama	1	2019–2020	5	85	23	2	33	17.0	4.6	0.4	6.6	
Justin Hamilton	C	LSU	1	2016–2017	64	1,177	262	55	442	18.4	4.1	0.9	6.9	
James Harden^{+}	G	Arizona State	2	2020–2022	80	2,946	658	839	1,875	36.8	8.2	10.5	23.4	
Devin Harris^{+}	G	Wisconsin	4	2007–2011	212	7,277	645	1,473	3,747	34.3	3.0	6.9	17.7	
Joe Harris	G	Virginia	7	2016–2023	432	11,620	1,464	752	5,007	26.9	3.4	1.7	11.6	
Lucious Harris	G	Long Beach State	7	1997–2004	456	9,884	1,173	714	3,528	21.7	2.6	1.6	7.7	
Shaquille Harrison	G	Tulsa	1	2021–2022	2	23	4	3	4	11.5	2.0	1.5	2.0	
Donnell Harvey	F	Florida	1	2004–2005	3	16	7	1	8	5.3	2.3	0.3	2.7	
Trenton Hassell	G	Austin Peay	3	2007–2010	131	2,510	337	116	473	19.2	2.6	0.9	3.6	
Robert Hawkins	G	Illinois State	2	1976–1978	67	1,824	204	130	1,169	27.2	3.0	1.9	17.4	
Jarvis Hayes	F	Georgia	2	2008–2010	119	2,865	375	94	994	24.1	3.2	0.8	8.4	
Jim Hayes	G	Boston University	1	1970–1971	47	494	45	47	144	10.5	1.0	1.0	3.1	
Killian Hayes	G	(Germany) Ratiopharm Ulm	1	2024–2025	6	162	18	31	54	27.0	3.0	5.2	9.0	
Mark Hendrickson	F	Washington State	2	1998–2000	27	423	70	16	121	15.7	2.6	0.6	4.5	
Art Heyman	G/F	Duke	1	1967–1968	19	439	70	37	262	23.1	3.7	1.9	13.8	
Rod Higgins	F	Fresno State	1	1985–1986	2	29	8	1	6	14.5	4.0	0.5	3.0	
Sean Higgins	F	Michigan	1	1994–1995	57	735	77	29	268	12.9	1.4	0.5	4.7	
Darnell Hillman	F	San Jose State	1	1977–1978	45	1,220	338	49	590	27.1	7.5	1.1	13.1	
Roy Hinson	F	Rutgers	4	1987–1991	164	5,173	1,061	169	2,568	31.5	6.5	1.0	15.7	
Rondae Hollis-Jefferson	F	Arizona	4	2015–2019	234	5,530	1,375	460	2,315	23.6	5.9	2.0	9.9	
Tom Hoover	C	Villanova	1	1968–1969	40	1,256	411	106	440	31.4	10.3	2.7	11.0	
Dave Hoppen	C	Nebraska	1	1992–1993	2	10	4	0	2	5.0	2.0	0.0	1.0	
Dennis Hopson	G/F	Ohio State	3	1987–1990	202	5,467	624	372	2,626	27.1	3.1	1.8	13.0	
Dennis Horner	F	NC State	1	2011–2012	8	22	5	0	5	2.8	0.6	0.0	0.6	
Eddie House	G	Arizona State	1	2006–2007	56	946	92	67	468	16.9	1.6	1.2	8.4	
Kim Hughes	C	Wisconsin	3	1975–1978	221	5,097	1,579	191	1,136	23.1	7.1	0.9	5.1	
Kris Humphries	F	Minnesota	4	2009–2013	245	6,320	2,100	231	2,327	25.8	8.6	0.9	9.5	
Les Hunter	F	Loyola (IL)	2	1969–1971	84	2,969	694	217	1,327	35.3	8.3	2.6	15.8	

=== I to J ===
All-time roster
Player	Pos.	Pre-draft team	Yrs	Seasons	Statistics									Ref.
Player	Pos.	Pre-draft team	Yrs	Seasons	GP	MP	REB	AST	PTS	MPG	RPG	APG	PPG	Ref.
Mile Ilić	C	(Serbia) FMP	1	2006–2007	5	6	1	0	0	1.2	0.2	0.0	0.0	
Kyrie Irving^{+}	G	Duke	4	2019–2023	143	5,113	691	830	3,879	35.8	4.8	5.8	27.1	
Jarrett Jack	G	Georgia Tech	2	2014–2016	112	3,268	381	609	1,368	29.2	3.4	5.4	12.2	
Jaren Jackson	G	Georgetown	1	1989–1990	28	160	24	13	67	5.7	0.9	0.5	2.4	
Jim Jackson	G	Ohio State	1	1996–1997	31	1,155	184	160	512	37.3	5.9	5.2	16.5	
Marc Jackson	C	Temple	1	2005–2006	37	433	89	22	170	11.7	2.4	0.6	4.6	
Phil Jackson^	F	North Dakota	2	1978–1980	75	1,264	202	97	439	16.9	2.7	1.3	5.9	
Stephen Jackson	G/F	Butler CC	1	2000–2001	77	1,660	208	140	635	21.6	2.7	1.8	8.2	
Tony Jackson	G/F	St. John's	2	1967–1969	77	2,658	503	140	1,440	34.5	6.5	1.8	18.7	
Dave Jamerson	G	Ohio	1	1993–1994	4	10	3	1	1	2.5	0.8	0.3	0.3	
Damion James	F	Texas	3	2010–2013	34	573	119	23	144	16.9	3.5	0.7	4.2	
Cory Jefferson	F	Baylor	1	2014–2015	50	531	145	16	183	10.6	2.9	0.3	3.7	
Mike James	G	Lamar	1	2020–2021	50	531	145	16	183	10.6	2.9	0.3	3.7	
Richard Jefferson	F	Arizona	7	2001–2008	489	17,499	2,627	1,486	8,507	35.8	5.4	3.0	17.4	
Alize Johnson	F	Missouri State	1	2020–2021	18	189	90	14	94	10.5	5.0	0.8	5.2	
Anthony Johnson	G	College of Charleston	2	2001–2003	100	1,208	107	134	364	12.1	1.1	1.3	3.6	
Armon Johnson	G	Nevada	1	2011–2012	8	119	12	11	45	14.9	1.5	1.4	5.6	
Cameron Johnson	F	North Carolina	3	2022–2025	140	4,169	618	384	2,260	29.8	4.4	2.7	16.1	
Chaney Johnson^{x}	F	Auburn	1	2025–2026	17	348	79	36	139	20.5	4.6	2.1	8.2	
Ed Johnson	C	Tennessee State	2	1969–1971	100	3,078	1,101	114	1,305	30.8	11.0	1.1	13.1	
George Johnson	C	Dillard	4	1977–1980; 1984–1985	305	7,388	2,182	394	1,912	24.2	7.2	1.3	6.3	
James Johnson	F	Wake Forest	1	2021–2022	62	1,191	215	130	340	19.2	3.5	2.1	5.5	
Joe Johnson^{+}	G/F	Arkansas	4	2012–2016	288	9,942	1,096	993	4,240	34.5	3.8	3.4	14.7	
Keon Johnson	G	Tennessee	2	2023–2025	84	1,986	304	178	870	23.6	3.6	2.1	10.4	
Linton Johnson	F	Tulane	1	2005–2006	9	35	7	2	11	3.9	0.8	0.2	1.2	
Mickey Johnson	F	Aurora	2	1982–1983; 1985–1986	121	2,575	556	361	1,180	21.3	4.6	3.0	9.8	
Reggie Johnson	F	Tennessee	1	1983–1984	72	818	138	40	346	11.4	1.9	0.6	4.8	
Stew Johnson	F	Murray State	2	1967–1969	64	1,401	371	53	545	21.9	5.8	0.8	8.5	
Tyler Johnson	G	Fresno State	2	2019–2021	47	878	101	71	306	18.7	2.1	1.5	6.5	
Bill Jones	F	Iowa	1	1988–1989	37	307	47	20	129	8.3	1.3	0.5	3.5	
Damon Jones	G	Houston	1	1998–1999	11	131	13	13	49	11.9	1.2	1.2	4.5	
Edgar Jones	F	Nevada	1	1980–1981	60	950	263	43	524	15.8	4.4	0.7	8.7	
Mark Jones	G	St. Bonaventure	1	1983–1984	6	16	2	5	7	2.7	0.3	0.8	1.2	
Rich Jones	F	Memphis	2	1975–1977	117	3,304	622	177	1,456	28.2	5.3	1.5	12.4	
DeAndre Jordan	C	Texas A&M	2	2019–2021	113	2,480	988	198	891	21.9	8.7	1.8	7.9	
Eddie Jordan	G	Rutgers	4	1977–1981	229	6,198	611	1,113	2,700	27.1	2.7	4.9	11.8	
Jerome Jordan	C	Tulsa	1	2014–2015	44	383	105	13	138	8.7	2.4	0.3	3.1	
Kris Joseph	F	Syracuse	1	2012–2013	4	30	2	0	2	7.5	0.5	0.0	0.5	
Yvon Joseph	C	Georgia Tech	1	1985–1986	1	5	0	0	2	5.0	0.0	0.0	2.0	

=== K to L ===
All-time roster
Player	Pos.	Pre-draft team	Yrs	Seasons	Statistics									Ref.
Player	Pos.	Pre-draft team	Yrs	Seasons	GP	MP	REB	AST	PTS	MPG	RPG	APG	PPG	Ref.
Sergey Karasev	G/F	(Russia) Triumph Lyubertsy	2	2014–2016	73	954	124	81	250	13.1	1.7	1.1	3.4	
Rich Kelley	C	Stanford	1	1979–1980	57	1,466	397	128	569	25.7	7.0	2.2	10.0	
Larry Kenon	F	Memphis	2	1973–1975	168	6,073	1,862	234	2,904	36.1	11.1	1.4	17.3	
Jason Kidd^ (#5)	G	California	7	2001–2008	506	18,733	3,662	4,620	7,373	37.0	7.2	9.1	14.6	
Sean Kilpatrick	G	Cincinnati	3	2015–2018	109	2,471	365	198	1,316	22.7	3.3	1.8	12.1	
Albert King	F	Maryland	6	1981–1987	410	10,393	1,895	978	5,595	25.3	4.6	2.4	13.6	
Bernard King^	F	Tennessee	3	1977–1979; 1992–1993	193	6,381	1,496	506	3,901	33.1	7.8	2.6	20.2	
Andrei Kirilenko	F	(Russia) CSKA Moscow	2	2013–2015	52	893	154	73	229	17.2	3.0	1.4	4.4	
Kerry Kittles	G	Villanova	7	1996–2000; 2001–2004	496	16,686	1,951	1,275	7,096	33.6	3.9	2.6	14.3	
Joe Kleine	C	Arkansas	1	1996–1997	28	453	114	23	84	16.2	4.1	0.8	3.0	
Rod Knowles	C	Davidson	1	1968–1969	1	3	0	0	0	3.0	0.0	0.0	0.0	
Tony Koski	F	Providence	1	1968–1969	5	30	7	4	6	6.0	1.4	0.8	1.2	
Barry Kramer	F	NYU	1	1969–1970	7	56	13	3	27	8.0	1.9	0.4	3.9	
Nenad Krstić	C	(Serbia) Partizan	4	2004–2008	226	6,094	1,290	238	2,551	27.0	5.7	1.1	11.3	
Bruce Kuczenski	F	UConn	1	1983–1984	7	28	8	4	11	4.0	1.1	0.6	1.6	
Rodions Kurucs	F	(Spain) FC Barcelona	3	2018–2021	115	1,994	386	105	752	17.3	3.4	0.9	6.5	
Sam Lacey	C	New Mexico State	1	1981–1982	54	650	103	73	155	12.0	1.9	1.4	2.9	
Bob Lackey	G	Marquette	2	1972–1974	71	1,200	164	137	413	16.9	2.3	1.9	5.8	
Wendell Ladner	F	Southern Miss	2	1973–1975	55	1,073	229	104	306	19.5	4.2	1.9	5.6	
Tom LaGarde	C	North Carolina	1	1984–1985	1	8	2	0	1	8.0	2.0	0.0	1.0	
Shane Larkin	G	Miami (FL)	1	2015–2016	78	1,751	180	342	566	22.4	2.3	4.4	7.3	
Manny Leaks	C	Niagara	3	1968–1969; 1970–1972	69	2,282	711	93	982	33.1	10.3	1.3	14.2	
Courtney Lee	G	Western Kentucky	1	2009–2010	71	2,375	252	121	885	33.5	3.5	1.7	12.5	
Doug Lee	G	Purdue	2	1991–1993	51	340	37	27	125	6.7	0.7	0.5	2.5	
Keith Lee	F	Memphis	1	1988–1989	57	840	259	42	271	14.7	4.5	0.7	4.8	
Kurk Lee	G	Towson	1	1990–1991	48	265	30	34	66	5.5	0.6	0.7	1.4	
George Lehmann	G	Campbell	1	1969–1970	46	679	39	104	344	14.8	0.8	2.3	7.5	
Barry Leibowitz	G	LIU Brooklyn	1	1967–1968	24	707	72	93	273	29.5	3.0	3.9	11.4	
Leary Lentz	F	Houston	1	1968–1969	26	442	107	9	129	17.0	4.1	0.3	5.0	
Caris LeVert	G/F	Michigan	5	2016–2021	225	5,828	840	836	2,937	25.9	3.7	3.7	13.1	
Maxwell Lewis	F	Pepperdine	1	2024–2025	21	298	53	17	112	14.2	2.5	0.8	5.3	
E. J. Liddell^{x}	F	Ohio State	1	2025–2026	26	349	69	24	147	13.4	2.7	0.9	5.7	
Jeremy Lin	G	Harvard	2	2016–2018	37	908	135	188	541	24.5	3.6	5.1	14.6	
Shaun Livingston	G	Peoria HS (IL)	1	2013–2014	76	1,974	246	245	629	26.0	3.2	3.2	8.3	
Bob Lloyd	G	Rutgers	2	1967–1969	125	2,353	220	229	1,127	18.8	1.8	1.8	9.0	
Brook Lopez^{+}	C	Stanford	9	2008–2017	562	18,118	4,005	867	10,444	32.2	7.1	1.5	18.6	
Bob Love	F	Southern	1	1976–1977	13	228	38	4	131	17.5	2.9	0.3	10.1	
Maurice Lucas	F	Marquette	2	1979–1981	90	2,870	787	256	1,334	31.9	8.7	2.8	14.8	
Timothé Luwawu-Cabarrot	F	(Serbia) Mega Leks	2	2019–2021	105	1,903	256	98	735	18.1	2.4	0.9	7.0	

=== M ===
All-time roster
Player	Pos.	Pre-draft team	Yrs	Seasons	Statistics									Ref.
Player	Pos.	Pre-draft team	Yrs	Seasons	GP	MP	REB	AST	PTS	MPG	RPG	APG	PPG	Ref.
Todd MacCulloch	C	Washington	1	2001–2002	62	1,502	378	78	604	24.2	6.1	1.3	9.7	
Don MacLean	F	UCLA	1	1997–1998	9	42	5	0	3	4.7	0.6	0.0	0.3	
Jamaal Magloire	C	Kentucky	1	2007–2008	24	259	81	7	44	10.8	3.4	0.3	1.8	
Randolph Mahaffey	F	Clemson	1	1968–1969	48	1,594	387	64	662	33.2	8.1	1.3	13.8	
Brian Mahoney	G	Manhattan	1	1972–1973	19	181	14	12	58	9.5	0.7	0.6	3.1	
Rick Mahorn	F	Hampton	4	1992–1996	210	2,383	605	80	668	11.3	2.9	0.4	3.2	
Terance Mann^{x}	G	Florida State	1	2025–2026	63	1,529	200	190	455	24.3	3.2	3.0	7.2	
Ed Manning	F	Jackson State	1	1974–1975	70	992	212	58	241	14.2	3.0	0.8	3.4	
Pace Mannion	G	Utah	1	1986–1987	23	284	39	45	83	12.3	1.7	2.0	3.6	
Stephon Marbury^{+}	G	Georgia Tech	3	1998–2001	172	6,672	525	1,398	3,963	38.8	3.1	8.1	23.0	
Donny Marshall	F	UConn	2	2001–2003	23	124	24	5	30	5.4	1.0	0.2	1.3	
Jaylen Martin	F	YNG Dreamerz (Overtime Elite)	1	2024–2025	3	5	0	0	3	1.7	0.0	0.0	1.0	
Jeremiah Martin	G	Memphis	1	2019–2020	9	99	10	18	64	11.0	1.1	2.0	7.1	
Kenyon Martin^{+}	F	Cincinnati	4	2000–2004	283	9,656	2,147	668	4,269	34.1	7.6	2.4	15.1	
Tyrese Martin	G	UConn	2	2024–2026	97	2,011	325	191	793	20.7	3.4	2.0	8.2	
Anthony Mason	F	Tennessee State	1	1989–1990	21	108	34	7	37	5.1	1.6	0.3	1.8	
Tony Massenburg	F	Maryland	1	1996–1997	79	1,954	517	23	568	24.7	6.5	0.3	7.2	
Johnny Mathis	F	Savannah State	1	1967–1968	51	656	194	28	173	12.9	3.8	0.5	3.4	
Bob McAdoo^	F/C	North Carolina	1	1980–1981	10	153	26	10	93	15.3	2.6	1.0	9.3	
Tahjere McCall	G	Tennessee State	1	2018–2019	1	8	1	0	4	8.0	1.0	0.0	4.0	
Ted McClain	G	Tennessee State	1	1975–1976	30	696	73	106	340	23.2	2.4	3.5	11.3	
Tim McCormick	C	Michigan	1	1987–1988	47	1,513	323	92	662	32.2	6.9	2.0	14.1	
Chris McCullough	F	Syracuse	2	2015–2017	38	434	85	11	147	11.4	2.2	0.3	3.9	
Xavier McDaniel	F	Wichita State	2	1996–1998	82	1,350	349	74	371	16.5	4.3	0.9	4.5	
K. J. McDaniels	F	Clemson	1	2016–2017	20	293	52	9	126	14.7	2.6	0.5	6.3	
Mike McGee	G/F	Michigan	1	1988–1989	80	2,027	189	116	1,038	25.3	2.4	1.5	13.0	
Maurice McHartley	G	North Carolina A&T	1	1968–1969	24	645	76	76	297	26.9	3.2	3.2	12.4	
Jim McIlvaine	C	Marquette	3	1998–2001	106	1,510	319	42	233	14.2	3.0	0.4	2.2	
Jeff McInnis	G	North Carolina	1	2005–2006	28	486	50	52	149	17.4	1.8	1.9	5.3	
Bob McIntyre	F	St. John's	2	1967–1968; 1969–1970	28	545	121	16	199	19.5	4.3	0.6	7.1	
Kevin McKenna	G	Creighton	3	1984–1985; 1986–1988	116	1,870	157	191	692	16.1	1.4	1.6	6.0	
Larry McNeill	F	Marquette	1	1976–1977	8	93	26	3	60	11.6	3.3	0.4	7.5	
Bill Melchionni (#25)	G	Villanova	7	1969–1976	502	15,337	1,082	3,044	6,230	30.6	2.2	6.1	12.4	
Ron Mercer	G/F	Kentucky	1	2004–2005	18	390	40	20	137	21.7	2.2	1.1	7.6	
Patty Mills	G	Saint Mary's	2	2021–2023	121	2,913	200	239	1,169	24.1	1.7	2.0	9.7	
Terry Mills	F	Michigan	2	1990–1992	120	2,254	594	101	929	18.8	5.0	0.8	7.7	
Paul Millsap	F	Louisiana Tech	1	2021–2022	24	270	89	24	82	11.3	3.7	1.0	3.4	
Shake Milton	G	SMU	1	2024–2025	27	492	51	64	199	18.2	1.9	2.4	7.4	
Josh Minott^{x}	F	Memphis	1	2025–2026	16	308	40	13	172	19.3	2.5	0.8	10.8	
Jérôme Moïso	F/C	UCLA	1	2004–2005	8	24	7	0	8	3.0	0.9	0.0	1.0	
Eric Money	G	Arizona	1	1978–1979	47	1,434	125	249	786	30.5	2.7	5.3	16.7	
Eric Montross	C	North Carolina	1	1996–1997	31	844	282	29	157	27.2	9.1	0.9	5.1	
Gene Moore	C	Saint Louis	1	1971–1972	68	1,149	409	40	502	16.9	6.0	0.6	7.4	
Johnny Moore	G	Texas	1	1987–1988	1	10	2	1	0	10.0	2.0	1.0	0.0	
Lowes Moore	G	West Virginia	1	1980–1981	71	1,406	168	228	497	19.8	2.4	3.2	7.0	
Mikki Moore	C	Nebraska	2	2003–2004; 2006–2007	83	2,092	405	74	778	25.2	4.9	0.9	9.4	
Chris Morris	F	Auburn	7	1988–1995	510	15,274	2,918	1,015	6,762	29.9	5.7	2.0	13.3	
Darius Morris	G	Michigan	1	2014–2015	38	299	27	48	83	7.9	0.7	1.3	2.2	
Markieff Morris	F	Kansas	1	2022–2023	27	285	59	25	96	10.6	2.2	0.9	3.6	
Anthony Morrow	G	Georgia Tech	2	2010–2012	120	3,492	299	129	1,511	29.1	2.5	1.1	12.6	
Alonzo Mourning^	C	Georgetown	2	2003–2005	30	672	154	22	283	22.4	5.1	0.7	9.4	
Timofey Mozgov	C	(Russia) Khimki	1	2017–2018	31	359	98	11	131	11.6	3.2	0.4	4.2	
Eric Murdock	G	Providence	1	1998–1999	15	401	35	66	119	26.7	2.3	4.4	7.9	
Gheorghe Mureșan	C	(France) Pau-Orthez	2	1998–2000	31	268	68	9	105	8.6	2.2	0.3	3.4	
Troy Murphy	F	Notre Dame	1	2010–2011	18	288	75	17	65	16.0	4.2	0.9	3.6	
Lamond Murray	F	California	1	2005–2006	57	576	132	13	196	10.1	2.3	0.2	3.4	
Džanan Musa	G/F	(Croatia) Cedevita	2	2018–2020	49	526	91	45	211	10.7	1.9	0.9	4.3	
Dikembe Mutombo^	C	Georgetown	1	2002–2003	24	514	153	19	138	21.4	6.4	0.8	5.8	
Pete Myers	G	Little Rock	1	1989–1990	28	543	68	100	198	19.4	2.4	3.6	7.1	

=== N to O ===
All-time roster
Player	Pos.	Pre-draft team	Yrs	Seasons	Statistics									Ref.
Player	Pos.	Pre-draft team	Yrs	Seasons	GP	MP	REB	AST	PTS	MPG	RPG	APG	PPG	Ref.
Boštjan Nachbar	F	(Italy) Benetton Treviso	3	2005–2008	162	3,289	524	154	1,465	20.3	3.2	1.0	9.0	
Eduardo Nájera	F	Oklahoma	2	2008–2010	40	523	105	34	128	13.1	2.6	0.9	3.2	
Shabazz Napier	G	UConn	1	2018–2019	56	983	100	143	529	17.6	1.8	2.6	9.4	
Swen Nater	C	UCLA	1	1975–1976	43	1,016	441	19	376	23.6	10.3	0.4	8.7	
Calvin Natt	F	Louisiana-Monroe	1	1979–1980	53	2,046	513	112	1,042	38.6	9.7	2.1	19.7	
Grant Nelson	F	Alabama	1	2025–2026	4	35	6	5	17	8.8	1.5	1.3	4.3	
Louie Nelson	G	Washington	1	1977–1978	25	353	49	29	212	14.1	2.0	1.2	8.5	
Mike Newlin	G	Utah	2	1979–1981	157	5,421	483	613	3,322	34.5	3.1	3.9	21.2	
Johnny Newman	G/F	Richmond	3	1993–1994; 1999–2001	227	5,080	452	223	2,313	22.4	2.0	1.0	10.2	
Andrew Nicholson	F	St. Bonaventure	1	2016–2017	10	111	27	3	30	11.1	2.7	0.3	3.0	
Nerlens Noel	C	Kentucky	1	2022–2023	3	43	9	3	3	14.3	3.0	1.0	1.0	
Mel Nowell	G	Ohio State	1	1967–1968	76	1,555	193	155	731	20.5	2.5	2.0	9.6	
David Nwaba	F	Cal Poly	1	2019–2020	20	268	45	8	104	13.4	2.3	0.4	5.2	
Ed O'Bannon	F	UCLA	2	1995–1997	109	1,887	280	91	588	17.3	2.6	0.8	5.4	
Jim O'Brien	F	Maryland	1	1973–1974	11	54	17	6	39	4.9	1.5	0.5	3.5	
Jahlil Okafor	C	Duke	1	2017–2018	26	328	76	11	166	12.6	2.9	0.4	6.4	
Mike O'Koren	F	North Carolina	7	1980–1986; 1987–1988	392	8,687	1,377	843	3,323	22.2	3.5	2.2	8.5	
Mehmet Okur	C	(Turkey) Efes Pilsen	1	2011–2012	17	454	81	30	130	26.7	4.8	1.8	7.6	
Kevin Ollie	G	UConn	1	2000–2001	19	161	23	25	22	8.5	1.2	1.3	1.2	
Royce O'Neale	F	Baylor	2	2022–2024	125	3,611	605	420	1,035	28.9	4.8	3.4	8.3	
Dan O'Sullivan	C	Fordham	1	1992–1993	3	10	4	0	4	3.3	1.3	0.0	1.3	
Travis Outlaw	F	Starkville HS (MS)	1	2010–2011	82	2,358	325	84	756	28.8	4.0	1.0	9.2	
Doug Overton	G	La Salle	3	1998–1999; 2000–2001; 2003–2004	26	512	42	73	155	19.7	1.6	2.8	6.0	
Larry Owens	F	Oral Roberts	1	2011–2012	7	75	13	4	13	10.7	1.9	0.6	1.9	

=== P to R ===
All-time roster
Player	Pos.	Pre-draft team	Yrs	Seasons	Statistics									Ref.
Player	Pos.	Pre-draft team	Yrs	Seasons	GP	MP	REB	AST	PTS	MPG	RPG	APG	PPG	Ref.
Robert Pack	G	USC	2	1996–1997; 2003–2004	60	1,405	104	352	591	23.4	1.7	5.9	9.9	
Scott Padgett	F	Kentucky	1	2005–2006	62	718	165	41	211	11.6	2.7	0.7	3.4	
Billy Paultz	C	St. John's	5	1970–1975	404	13,804	4,544	823	6,297	34.2	11.2	2.0	15.6	
Norvel Pelle	C	Price HS (CA)	1	2020–2021	3	28	7	0	6	9.3	2.3	0.0	2.0	
Elliot Perry	G	Memphis	2	1998–2000	90	1,046	87	174	395	11.6	1.0	1.9	4.4	
Reggie Perry	F	Mississippi State	1	2020–2021	26	211	73	14	78	8.1	2.8	0.5	3.0	
Ron Perry	G	Virginia Tech	1	1968–1969	23	812	95	85	444	35.3	4.1	3.7	19.3	
Tim Perry	F	Temple	1	1995–1996	22	167	35	6	52	7.6	1.6	0.3	2.4	
Johan Petro	C	(France) Pau-Orthez	2	2010–2012	136	1,813	436	89	523	13.3	3.2	0.7	3.8	
Dražen Petrović^ (#3)	G	(Socialist Federal Republic of Yugoslavia) Cibona	3	1990–1993	195	6,569	540	565	3,798	33.7	2.8	2.9	19.5	
Roger Phegley	G	Bradley	1	1979–1980	28	541	70	32	327	19.3	2.5	1.1	11.7	
Eddie Phillips	F	Alabama	1	1982–1983	48	416	77	29	152	8.7	1.6	0.6	3.2	
Paul Pierce^	F	Kansas	1	2013–2014	75	2,098	348	178	1,010	28.0	4.6	2.4	13.5	
Theo Pinson	G	North Carolina	2	2018–2020	51	576	90	77	201	11.3	1.8	1.5	3.9	
Zoran Planinić	G	(Croatia) Cibona	3	2003–2006	148	1,584	198	165	561	10.7	1.3	1.1	3.8	
Mason Plumlee	C	Duke	2	2013–2015	152	3,018	820	134	1,237	19.9	5.4	0.9	8.1	
Howard Porter	F	Villanova	1	1977–1978	55	1,216	262	40	706	22.1	4.8	0.7	12.8	
Kevin Porter	G	Saint Francis (PA)	1	1977–1978	74	2,686	199	801	1,197	36.3	2.7	10.8	16.2	
Michael Porter Jr.^{x}	F	Missouri	1	2025–2026	52	1,689	367	158	1,259	32.5	7.1	3.0	24.2	
Drake Powell^{x}	G	North Carolina	1	2025–2026	63	1,320	111	91	408	21.0	1.8	1.4	6.5	
Taurean Prince	F	Baylor	2	2019–2021	76	2,075	415	123	870	27.3	5.5	1.6	11.4	
Chris Quinn	G	Notre Dame	1	2009–2010	25	223	16	29	56	8.9	0.6	1.2	2.2	
Kelvin Ransey	G	Ohio State	3	1983–1986	240	5,130	373	1,090	2,070	21.4	1.6	4.5	8.6	
Willie Reed	C	Saint Louis	1	2015–2016	39	426	122	10	182	10.9	3.1	0.3	4.7	
Khalid Reeves	G	Arizona	2	1995–1997	81	1,463	127	216	531	18.1	1.6	2.7	6.6	
Micheal Ray Richardson^{+}	G	Montana	4	1982–1986	208	7,018	1,029	1,410	3,357	33.7	4.9	6.8	16.1	
Rich Rinaldi	G	Saint Peter's	1	1973–1974	5	28	5	1	12	5.6	1.0	0.2	2.4	
André Roberson	G/F	Colorado	1	2020–2021	5	63	15	4	6	12.6	3.0	0.8	1.2	
Bernard Robinson	G/F	Michigan	1	2006–2007	10	37	6	2	10	3.7	0.6	0.2	1.0	
Cliff Robinson	F	USC	2	1979–1981	133	3,483	987	203	2,180	26.2	7.4	1.5	16.4	
Clifford Robinson	F/C	UConn	3	2004–2007	159	3,417	484	170	927	21.5	3.0	1.1	5.8	
Rumeal Robinson	G	Michigan	2	1992–1994	97	1,886	183	368	773	19.4	1.9	3.8	8.0	
Thomas Robinson	F	Kansas	1	2015–2016	71	917	359	46	307	12.9	5.1	0.6	4.3	
John Roche	G	South Carolina	3	1971–1974	209	6,462	377	815	2,735	30.9	1.8	3.9	13.1	
Rodney Rogers	F	Wake Forest	2	2002–2004	137	2,712	570	244	1,017	19.8	4.2	1.8	7.4	
Quinton Ross	G	SMU	1	2010–2011	36	353	30	10	57	9.8	0.8	0.3	1.6	
D'Angelo Russell^{+}	G	Ohio State	3	2017–2019; 2024–2025	158	4,399	586	973	2,828	27.8	3.7	6.2	17.9	

=== S ===
All-time roster
Player	Pos.	Pre-draft team	Yrs	Seasons	Statistics									Ref.
Player	Pos.	Pre-draft team	Yrs	Seasons	GP	MP	REB	AST	PTS	MPG	RPG	APG	PPG	Ref.
Soumaila Samake	C	(Slovenia) Union Olimpija	1	2000–2001	34	226	53	1	46	6.6	1.6	0.0	1.4	
Wayne Sappleton	F	Loyola (IL)	1	1984–1985	33	298	75	7	96	9.0	2.3	0.2	2.9	
Ben Saraf^{x}	G	(Germany) Ratiopharm Ulm	1	2025–2026	44	916	92	145	332	20.8	2.1	3.3	7.5	
Brian Scalabrine	F	USC	4	2001–2005	210	3,109	609	220	819	14.8	2.9	1.0	3.9	
Billy Schaeffer	F	St. John's	3	1973–1976	106	1,270	200	66	596	12.0	1.9	0.6	5.6	
Dwayne Schintzius	C	Florida	3	1992–1995	78	672	178	30	163	8.6	2.3	0.4	2.1	
Dennis Schröder	G	(Germany) Phantoms Braunschweig	2	2023–2025	52	1,699	170	327	848	32.7	3.3	6.3	16.3	
Luis Scola	F	(Spain) Tau Ceramica	1	2016–2017	36	461	139	37	184	12.8	3.9	1.0	5.1	
Trevon Scott^{x}	F	Cincinnati	1	2025–2026	6	182	31	10	48	30.3	5.2	1.7	8.0	
Rony Seikaly	C	Syracuse	2	1997–1999	18	240	57	10	57	13.3	3.2	0.6	3.2	
Charles Shackleford	C	NC State	2	1988–1990	130	2,041	632	77	760	15.7	4.9	0.6	5.8	
Landry Shamet	G	Wichita State	1	2020–2021	61	1,403	112	99	567	23.0	1.8	1.6	9.3	
Day'Ron Sharpe^{x}	F/C	North Carolina	5	2021–2026	253	3,932	1,492	375	1,777	15.5	5.9	1.5	7.0	
Tornike Shengelia	F	(Belgium) Spirou Charleroi	2	2012–2014	36	230	37	15	55	6.4	1.0	0.4	1.5	
Purvis Short	F	Jackson State	1	1989–1990	82	2,213	248	145	1,072	27.0	3.0	1.8	13.1	
Iman Shumpert	G/F	Georgia Tech	2	2019–2021	15	252	35	12	56	16.8	2.3	0.8	3.7	
Ben Simmons	G	LSU	2	2022–2025	90	2,289	554	571	587	25.4	6.2	6.3	6.5	
Bobby Simmons	F	DePaul	2	2008–2010	94	2,124	340	107	678	22.6	3.6	1.1	7.2	
Walt Simon	F	Benedict College	3	1967–1970	227	7,964	1,552	740	3,634	35.1	6.8	3.3	16.0	
Ralph Simpson	G	Michigan State	2	1978–1980	40	608	72	82	263	15.2	1.8	2.1	6.6	
Henry Sims	C	Georgetown	1	2015–2016	14	263	72	9	91	18.8	5.1	0.6	6.5	
Al Skinner	G	UMass	5	1974–1979	244	5,722	884	772	2,496	23.5	3.6	3.2	10.2	
Reggie Slater	F	Wyoming	1	2001–2002	4	10	2	0	5	2.5	0.5	0.0	1.3	
Tamar Slay	G	Marshall	2	2002–2004	58	439	56	28	145	7.6	1.0	0.5	2.5	
Donald Sloan	G	Texas A&M	1	2015–2016	61	1,318	173	268	424	21.6	2.8	4.4	7.0	
Dennis Smith Jr.	G	NC State	1	2023–2024	56	1,059	164	203	369	18.9	2.9	3.6	6.6	
Dru Smith	G	Missouri	1	2022–2023	10	91	15	17	33	9.1	1.5	1.7	3.3	
Jabari Smith	C	LSU	1	2004–2005	45	648	111	38	166	14.4	2.5	0.8	3.7	
Jerry Smith	G	Louisville	1	2011–2012	5	46	7	4	7	9.2	1.4	0.8	1.4	
Joe Smith	F	Maryland	1	2010–2011	4	25	3	1	2	6.3	0.8	0.3	0.5	
John Smith	C	CSU–Pueblo	1	1969–1970	16	165	60	3	23	10.3	3.8	0.2	1.4	
Malachi Smith^{x}	G	Gonzaga	1	2025–2026	15	359	51	49	124	23.9	3.4	3.3	8.3	
Robert Smith	G	UNLV	1	1979–1980	59	736	76	85	309	12.5	1.3	1.4	5.2	
Willie Sojourner	C	Weber State	2	1973–1975	161	2,336	610	96	818	14.5	3.8	0.6	5.1	
Willie Somerset	G	Duquesne	1	1968–1969	31	1,325	135	106	747	42.7	4.4	3.4	24.1	
Rory Sparrow	G	Villanova	1	1980–1981	15	212	18	32	56	14.1	1.2	2.1	3.7	
Bruce Spraggins	F	Virginia Union	1	1967–1968	70	1,590	329	66	852	22.7	4.7	0.9	12.2	
Jerry Stackhouse	G/F	North Carolina	1	2012–2013	37	544	33	35	182	14.7	0.9	0.9	4.9	
Nik Stauskas	G	Michigan	1	2017–2018	35	478	63	38	177	13.7	1.8	1.1	5.1	
Vladimir Stepania	C	(Slovenia) Union Olimpija	1	2000–2001	29	280	109	16	82	9.7	3.8	0.6	2.8	
DeShawn Stevenson	G	Washington Union HS (CA)	1	2011–2012	51	960	101	41	148	18.8	2.0	0.8	2.9	
Awvee Storey	G/F	Arizona State	1	2004–2005	9	32	5	1	8	3.6	0.6	0.1	0.9	
Mark Strickland	F	Temple	1	2000–2001	9	202	41	7	51	22.4	4.6	0.8	5.7	
Edmond Sumner	G	Xavier	1	2022–2023	53	736	79	68	378	13.9	1.5	1.3	7.1	
Stromile Swift	F	LSU	2	2007–2009	27	359	83	5	128	13.3	3.1	0.2	4.7	

=== T to V ===
All-time roster
Player	Pos.	Pre-draft team	Yrs	Seasons	Statistics									Ref.
Player	Pos.	Pre-draft team	Yrs	Seasons	GP	MP	REB	AST	PTS	MPG	RPG	APG	PPG	Ref.
Levern Tart	G	Bradley	4	1967–1971	173	6,200	900	526	3,527	35.8	5.2	3.0	20.4	
Brian Taylor	G	Princeton	4	1972–1976	271	8,887	811	1,002	3,804	32.8	3.0	3.7	14.0	
Jay Taylor	G	Eastern Illinois	1	1989–1990	17	114	11	5	51	6.7	0.6	0.3	3.0	
Ollie Taylor	G	Houston	3	1970–1972; 1973–1974	170	3,584	651	309	1,430	21.1	3.8	1.8	8.4	
Ronald Taylor	C	USC	1	1969–1970	72	873	286	64	360	12.1	4.0	0.9	5.0	
Tyshawn Taylor	G	Kansas	2	2012–2014	61	491	33	57	174	8.0	0.5	0.9	2.9	
Marquis Teague	G	Kentucky	1	2013–2014	21	201	21	30	62	9.6	1.0	1.4	3.0	
Mirza Teletović	F	(Spain) Saski Baskonia	3	2012–2015	165	2,787	555	126	1,149	16.9	3.4	0.8	7.0	
Garrett Temple	G	LSU	1	2019–2020	62	1,730	218	156	641	27.9	3.5	2.5	10.3	
Chuck Terry	F	Long Beach State	2	1975–1977	127	2,045	287	77	524	16.1	2.3	0.6	4.1	
Jason Terry	G	Arizona	1	2013–2014	35	570	37	56	159	16.3	1.1	1.6	4.5	
Reggie Theus	G	UNLV	1	1990–1991	81	2,955	229	378	1,510	36.5	2.8	4.7	18.6	
Billy Thomas	G	Kansas	2	2004–2005; 2007–2008	29	364	36	17	94	12.6	1.2	0.6	3.2	
Cam Thomas	G	LSU	5	2021–2026	239	5,562	596	516	3,630	23.3	2.5	2.2	15.2	
Jamel Thomas	F	Providence	1	2000–2001	5	56	9	0	13	11.2	1.8	0.0	2.6	
John Thomas	F	Minnesota	1	2005–2006	2	36	10	0	2	18.0	5.0	0.0	1.0	
Lance Thomas	F	Duke	1	2019–2020	7	98	13	6	24	14.0	1.9	0.9	3.4	
Marcus Thornton	G	LSU	1	2013–2014	26	620	74	30	320	23.8	2.8	1.2	12.3	
Drew Timme	F	Gonzaga	1	2024–2025	9	254	65	20	109	28.2	7.2	2.2	12.1	
Ray Tolbert	F	Indiana	1	1981–1982	12	115	27	8	44	9.6	2.3	0.7	3.7	
Nolan Traoré^{x}	G	(France) Saint-Quentin	1	2025–2026	56	1,243	99	213	499	22.2	1.8	3.8	8.9	
Jeff Turner	F	Vanderbilt	3	1984–1987	201	3,082	552	182	1,025	15.3	2.7	0.9	5.1	
Ben Uzoh	G	Tulsa	1	2010–2011	42	438	61	69	158	10.4	1.5	1.6	3.8	
Jan van Breda Kolff	F	Vanderbilt	7	1976–1983	434	10,155	1,778	815	2,596	23.4	4.1	1.9	6.0	
Keith Van Horn	F	Utah	5	1997–2002	314	10,881	2,398	575	5,700	34.7	7.6	1.8	18.2	
Greivis Vásquez	G	Maryland	1	2016–2017	3	39	2	5	7	13.0	0.7	1.7	2.3	
David Vaughn III	F	Memphis	2	1997–1999	25	264	83	3	78	10.6	3.3	0.1	3.1	
Jacque Vaughn	G	Kansas	2	2004–2006	151	2,644	198	258	647	17.5	1.3	1.7	4.3	
Rashad Vaughn	G	UNLV	1	2017–2018	1	4	0	1	0	4.0	0.0	1.0	0.0	
Bob Verga	G	Duke	1	1968–1969	24	521	68	41	306	21.7	2.8	1.7	12.8	
Noah Vonleh	C	Indiana	1	2020–2021	4	11	1	1	0	2.8	0.3	0.3	0.0	
Sasha Vujačić	G	(Italy) Snaidero Udine	1	2010–2011	56	1,594	182	127	636	28.5	3.3	2.3	11.4	

=== W to Z ===
All-time roster
Player	Pos.	Pre-draft team	Yrs	Seasons	Statistics									Ref.
Player	Pos.	Pre-draft team	Yrs	Seasons	GP	MP	REB	AST	PTS	MPG	RPG	APG	PPG	Ref.
Foots Walker	G	West Georgia	4	1980–1984	231	4,799	419	996	1,126	20.8	1.8	4.3	4.9	
Lonnie Walker IV	G	Miami (FL)	1	2023–2024	58	1,011	127	74	565	17.4	2.2	1.3	9.7	
Gerald Wallace	F	Alabama	2	2011–2013	85	2,649	428	230	774	31.2	5.0	2.7	9.1	
Jamie Waller	G	Virginia Union	1	1987–1988	9	91	13	3	42	10.1	1.4	0.3	4.7	
Rex Walters	G	Kansas	3	1993–1996	139	1,908	138	203	718	13.7	1.0	1.5	5.2	
T. J. Warren	F	NC State	1	2022–2023	26	490	72	29	247	18.8	2.8	1.1	9.5	
Duane Washington	G	Middle Tennessee	1	1987–1988	15	156	22	34	54	10.4	1.5	2.3	3.6	
Dwayne Washington	G	Syracuse	2	1986–1988	140	2,979	247	507	1,249	21.3	1.8	3.6	8.9	
Trooper Washington	F	Cheyney	2	1971–1973	156	4,537	1,303	364	1,402	29.1	8.4	2.3	9.0	
Wilson Washington	F	Old Dominion	2	1977–1979	86	1,662	436	56	712	19.3	5.1	0.7	8.3	
Yuta Watanabe	F	George Washington	1	2022–2023	58	928	141	48	322	16.0	2.4	0.8	5.6	
Trendon Watford	F	LSU	2	2023–2025	107	1,769	354	196	882	16.5	3.3	1.8	8.2	
C. J. Watson	G	Tennessee	1	2012–2013	80	1,521	145	161	543	19.0	1.8	2.0	6.8	
James Webb III	F	Boise State	1	2017–2018	10	120	24	4	16	12.0	2.4	0.4	1.6	
Elnardo Webster	F	Saint Peter's	1	1971–1972	8	14	1	1	6	1.8	0.1	0.1	0.8	
Robert Werdann	C	St. John's	2	1995–1997	19	124	29	2	48	6.5	1.5	0.1	2.5	
David Wesley	G	Baylor	1	1993–1994	60	542	44	123	183	9.0	0.7	2.1	3.1	
Mario West	G	Georgia Tech	1	2010–2011	6	116	11	10	22	19.3	1.8	1.7	3.7	
Dexter Westbrook	F	Providence	1	1967–1968	7	59	9	2	31	8.4	1.3	0.3	4.4	
Dariq Whitehead	F	Duke	2	2023–2025	22	270	33	15	117	12.3	1.5	0.7	5.3	
Isaiah Whitehead	G	Seton Hall	2	2016–2018	89	1,823	210	212	643	20.5	2.4	2.4	7.2	
Hank Whitney	F	Iowa State	2	1967–1969	68	1,802	658	94	859	26.5	9.7	1.4	12.6	
Ken Wilburn	F	Central State	1	1968–1969	4	22	4	2	10	5.5	1.0	0.5	2.5	
Jacob Wiley	F	Eastern Washington	1	2017–2018	5	33	11	2	4	6.6	2.2	0.4	0.8	
Aaron Williams	F/C	Xavier	5	2000–2005	336	6,966	1,585	340	2,417	20.7	4.7	1.0	7.2	
Alan Williams	F/C	UC Santa Barbara	1	2018–2019	5	26	19	3	18	5.2	3.8	0.6	3.6	
Alondes Williams	G	Wake Forest	1	2022–2023	1	5	1	0	0	5.0	1.0	0.0	0.0	
Buck Williams^{+} (#52)	F	Maryland	8	1981–1989	635	23,100	7,576	976	10,440	36.4	11.9	1.5	16.4	
Deron Williams^{+}	G	Illinois	5	2010–2015	277	9,470	875	2,078	4,609	34.2	3.2	7.5	16.6	
Earl Williams	C	Winston-Salem State	1	1976–1977	1	7	2	1	3	7.0	2.0	1.0	3.0	
Eric Williams	F	Providence	1	2004–2005	21	739	95	42	265	35.2	4.5	2.0	12.6	
Jayson Williams^{+}	F/C	St. John's	7	1992–1999	373	8,651	3,328	259	3,084	23.2	8.9	0.7	8.3	
Jordan Williams	F	Maryland	1	2011–2012	43	635	156	11	197	14.8	3.6	0.3	4.6	
Kevin Williams	G	St. John's	1	1988–1989	41	433	50	36	175	10.6	1.2	0.9	4.3	
Marcus Williams	G	UConn	2	2006–2008	132	2,169	264	400	847	16.4	2.0	3.0	6.4	
Ray Williams	G	Minnesota	3	1981–1982; 1985–1987	119	3,595	404	682	2,024	30.2	3.4	5.7	17.0	
Reggie Williams	F	Georgetown	1	1996–1997	11	167	24	8	71	15.2	2.2	0.7	6.5	
Sean Williams	F/C	Boston College	3	2007–2010	126	1,871	447	42	541	14.8	3.5	0.3	4.3	
Shawne Williams	F	Memphis	1	2011–2012	25	514	68	16	113	20.6	2.7	0.6	4.5	
Shelden Williams	F	Duke	1	2011–2012	58	1,276	350	35	268	22.0	6.0	0.6	4.6	
Terrence Williams	F	Louisville	2	2009–2011	88	1,970	384	254	723	22.4	4.4	2.9	8.2	
Ziaire Williams^{x}	F	Stanford	2	2024–2026	119	2,822	421	144	1,205	23.7	3.5	1.2	10.1	
John Williamson (#23)	G	New Mexico State	7	1973–1980	405	12,321	1,028	1,142	7,202	30.4	2.5	2.8	17.8	
Bill Willoughby	F	Dwight Morrow HS (NJ)	2	1982–1984	77	1,020	204	64	327	13.2	2.6	0.8	4.2	
Jalen Wilson^{x}	F	Kansas	3	2023–2026	176	3,554	515	240	1,306	20.2	2.9	1.4	7.4	
Mike Wilson	G	Marquette	2	1984–1985; 1986–1987	13	135	17	17	30	10.4	1.3	1.3	2.3	
Ricky Wilson	G	George Mason	1	1987–1988	6	47	1	6	21	7.8	0.2	1.0	3.5	
Dave Wohl	G	Penn	2	1976–1978	47	1,042	80	140	310	22.2	1.7	3.0	6.6	
Danny Wolf^{x}	F	Michigan	1	2025–2026	57	1,187	281	127	508	20.8	4.9	2.2	8.9	
Leon Wood	G	Cal State Fullerton	2	1986–1987; 1989–1990	104	1,933	132	417	607	18.6	1.3	4.0	5.8	
Mike Woodson	G	Indiana	1	1981–1982	7	145	13	16	83	20.7	1.9	2.3	11.9	
Orlando Woolridge	F	Notre Dame	2	1986–1988	94	3,260	458	332	1,863	34.7	4.9	3.5	19.8	
Willie Worsley	G	UTEP	1	1968–1969	24	460	35	39	145	19.2	1.5	1.6	6.0	
Antoine Wright	G	Texas A&M	3	2005–2008	143	2,563	330	134	651	17.9	2.3	0.9	4.6	
Brandan Wright	F/C	North Carolina	1	2010–2011	16	184	48	7	58	11.5	3.0	0.4	3.6	
Yi Jianlian	F	(China) Guangdong Southern Tigers	2	2008–2010	113	3,076	698	107	1,148	27.2	6.2	0.9	10.2	
Thaddeus Young	F	Georgia Tech	2	2014–2016	101	3,236	826	173	1,488	32.0	8.2	1.7	14.7	
Gary Zeller	G	Drake	1	1971–1972	12	82	10	2	18	6.8	0.8	0.2	1.5	
Tyler Zeller	C	North Carolina	1	2017–2018	42	703	194	28	300	16.7	4.6	0.7	7.1	
Derrick Zimmerman	G	Mississippi State	1	2005–2006	2	32	4	7	4	16.0	2.0	3.5	2.0	
