= 1967–68 New Jersey Americans season =

ABA basketball team season

- Head coach: Max Zaslofsky
- Arena: Teaneck Armory

Results
- Record: 36–42 (.462)
- Place: Division: 5th (Eastern (ABA))
- Playoff finish: Did not qualify
- Stats at Basketball Reference
- Radio: WJRZ

The 1967–68 New Jersey Americans season was the first season of the franchise in the American Basketball Association (ABA). Originally, they planned on going by the New Jersey Freighters or New York Freighters before changing their team name to the New York Americans and then New Jersey Americans by the start of the regular season due to the Americans failing to find a permanent home venue in the New York City area. The Americans finished the season tied with the Kentucky Colonels for the fourth and final playoff spot. However, due to the Teaneck Armory being booked up on the day of the one-game playoff and the playing surface at the Commack Long Island Arena (the future home of the team) being deemed unsuitable, the two teams did not play a one-game playoff, which resulted in the game being forfeited in favor of the Colonels, giving them the last playoff spot instead of the Americans. The team would relocate to Long Island and then become the New York Nets before the next season started.

== ABA Draft ==
Player	School/Club team
Sonny Dove	St. John's
Mal Graham	New York University
George Stone	Marshall
Dick Pruett	Jacksonville
Bob Wolf	Marquette
Tim Edwards	Amherst
Dan Hansard	St. Thomas (MN)
Frank Holloendoner	Georgetown
Harry Laurie	St. Peters (NJ)

This draft was slated to have them participating under their original New Jersey Freighters name, though the selections would retroactively be considered draft picks done by the New Jersey Americans by the time the inaugural ABA season began.

== Roster ==
1967–68 New Jersey Americans roster
Players

Pos.	No.	Player	Height	Weight	DOB	From
C	20	Dan Anderson	6 ft 10 in (2.08 m)	230 lb (104 kg)	1943-02-15	Augsburg
G	33	Johnny Austin	6 ft 0 in (1.83 m)	170 lb (77 kg)	1944-08-31	Boston College
C	22, 41	Al Beard	6 ft 9 in (2.06 m)	200 lb (91 kg)	1996-08-15	Norfolk State
C	41	Jim Caldwell	6 ft 10 in (2.08 m)	240 lb (109 kg)	1943-01-28	Georgia Tech
G	40	Art Heyman	6 ft 5 in (1.96 m)	205 lb (93 kg)	1941-06-24	Duke
G	25	Tony Jackson	6 ft 4 in (1.93 m)	200 lb (91 kg)	1942-11-07	St. John's
F	41	Stew Johnson	6 ft 8 in (2.03 m)	220 lb (100 kg)	1944-08-19	Murray State
G	20, 40	Barry Leibowitz	6 ft 2 in (1.88 m)	180 lb (82 kg)	1945-09-10	Long Island
G	3	Bob Lloyd	6 ft 2 in (1.88 m)	184 lb (83 kg)	1946-01-03	Rutgers
F	32	Johnny Mathis	6 ft 6 in (1.98 m)	220 lb (100 kg)	1943-07-14	Savannah State
F	44	Bob McIntyre	6 ft 6 in (1.98 m)	215 lb (98 kg)	1944-01-23	St. John's
G	27	Mel Nowell	6 ft 2 in (1.88 m)	170 lb (77 kg)	1939-12-27	Ohio State
F	4	Walt Simon	6 ft 6 in (1.98 m)	200 lb (91 kg)	1939-12-01	Benedict
F	30	Bruce Spraggins	6 ft 5 in (1.96 m)	188 lb (85 kg)	1939-08-31	Virginia Union
G	40	Levern Tart	6 ft 2 in (1.88 m)	195 lb (88 kg)	1942-06-01	Bradley
F	22	Dexter Westbrook	6 ft 8 in (2.03 m)	190 lb (86 kg)	1943	Providence
F	44	Hank Whitney	6 ft 7 in (2.01 m)	230 lb (104 kg)	1939-04-28	Iowa State

Coaches
Head coach
- Max Zaslofsky

Legend
- (DP) Unsigned draft pick
- (FA) Free agent
- (S) Suspended
- Injured

Roster

== Standings ==
Team	W	L	PCT.	GB
Pittsburgh Pipers *	54	24	.692	—
Minnesota Muskies *	50	28	.641	4
Indiana Pacers *	38	40	.487	16
Kentucky Colonels *	36	42	.462	18
New Jersey Americans	36	42	.462	18

== Player statistics ==
Legend
GP	Games played	GS	Games started	MPG	Minutes per game
FG%	Field-goal percentage	3P%	3-point field-goal percentage	FT%	Free-throw percentage
RPG	Rebounds per game	APG	Assists per game	SPG	Steals per game
BPG	Blocks per game	PPG	Points per game

=== Regular season statistics ===
As of March 20, 1968

New Jersey Americans statistics
Player	GP	GS	MPG	FG%	3P%	FT%	RPG	APG	SPG	BPG	PPG
Dan Anderson	78	—	33.7	.494	—	.697	11.0	1.2	—	—	14.7
John Austin	41	—	16.9	.387	.000	.721	1.6	1.4	—	—	7.7
Al Beard	12	—	9.8	.522	—	.545	3.8	.0	—	—	2.5
Jim Caldwell	12	—	21.8	.348	—	.455	7.1	.9	—	—	4.7
Art Heyman	19	—	23.1	.385	.176	.644	3.7	1.9	—	—	13.8
Tony Jackson	74	—	35.6	.383	.301	.829	6.8	1.9	—	—	19.4
Stew Johnson	55	—	21.7	.344	.302	.625	5.9	.8	—	—	8.6
Barry Leibowitz	24	—	29.5	.341	.000	.802	3.0	3.9	—	—	11.4
Bob Lloyd	58	—	17.2	.421	.375	.854	1.9	1.6	—	—	8.1
Johnny Mathis	51	—	12.9	.371	.000	.636	3.8	.5	—	—	3.4
Bob McIntyre	21	—	21.5	.374	.000	.586	4.8	.5	—	—	8.3
Mel Nowell	76	—	20.5	.402	.281	.826	2.5	2.0	—	—	9.6
Walt Simon	78	—	32.3	.453	.067	.635	6.7	2.7	—	—	13.3
Bruce Spraggins	70	—	22.7	.446	.400	.708	4.7	.9	—	—	12.2
Levern Tart	31	—	35.0	.410	.000	.829	3.9	3.3	—	—	19.0
Dexter Westbrook	7	—	8.4	.632	—	.778	1.3	.3	—	—	4.4
Hank Whitney	37	—	31.3	.393	—	.714	12.9	1.5	—	—	16.0

== Awards and honors ==
1968 ABA All-Star Game selection (game played on January 9, 1968)

- Tony Jackson
