= Johnny Mathis (disambiguation) =

Johnny Mathis (born 1935) is an American pop music singer.

John or Johnny Mathis may also refer to:

- "Country" Johnny Mathis (1930–2011), American country music singer and songwriter
- John Mathis, American politician from Utah
- John Mathis (1942–2023), American soul singer who performed as Johnny Johnson for Johnny Johnson and the Bandwagon
- Johnny Mathis (basketball) (1943–2023), American basketball player

== See also ==
- John H. Mathis & Company, a shipbuilding company based in Camden, New Jersey
