= 1967–68 Pittsburgh Pipers season =

- ABA champions
- Division champions
- Head coach: Vince Cazzetta
- Arena: Pittsburgh Civic Arena

Results
- Record: 54–24 (.692)
- Place: Division: 1st
- Playoff finish: Won ABA Championship
- Radio: WEEP

The 1967–68 Pittsburgh Pipers season was the very first season of the ABA and the team alike. The Pipers finished first in the Eastern Division and won their first and only ABA title.

In the Eastern Division semifinals, the Pipers swept the Indiana Pacers in three games. In the Eastern Division Finals, the Pipers eliminated the Minnesota Muskies, in five games. The Western Division champion New Orleans Buccaneers appeared in the ABA Championships for the first time and were defeated by the Pipers in seven games. The Pipers would soon move to Minnesota for the next season, only to return a year later. Plaguing injuries nagged the team and bad ownership problems following a future rebranding into the Pittsburgh Condors for the rest of their brief tenure in Pittsburgh, as they would disband in 1972, only four years after winning the title. The Pipers hold a legacy as the first ABA champion along with Pittsburgh's only professional basketball champion.

== Roster ==
1967–68 Pittsburgh Pipers roster
Players

Pos.	No.	Player	Height	Weight	DOB	From
C	13	Craig Dill	6 ft 11 in (2.11 m)	215 lb (98 kg)	December 17, 1944	Michigan
G	20	Cal Graham	6 ft 2 in (1.88 m)	195 lb (88 kg)	June 7, 1944	Gannon University
C	30	Ira Harge	6 ft 9 in (2.06 m)	225 lb (102 kg)	March 14, 1941	New Mexico
C	42	Connie Hawkins	6 ft 8 in (2.03 m)	210 lb (95 kg)	July 17, 1942	Iowa
SF	12	Art Heyman	6 ft 5 in (1.96 m)	205 lb (93 kg)	June 24, 1941	Duke
F	12	Bob Hogsett	6 ft 7 in (2.01 m)	230 lb (104 kg)	January 29, 1941	Tennessee
PG	20	Jim Jarvis	6 ft 1 in (1.85 m)	175 lb (79 kg)	March 3, 1943	Oregon State
G	14	Arvesta Kelly	6 ft 2 in (1.88 m)	175 lb (79 kg)	November 20, 1945	Lincoln (MO)
F	40	Tom Kerwin	6 ft 7 in (2.01 m)	210 lb (95 kg)	July 19, 1944	Centenary
SG	25	Barry Leibowitz	6 ft 2 in (1.88 m)	180 lb (82 kg)	September 10, 1945	Long Island
G	22	Bill Meyer	6 ft 3 in (1.91 m)	195 lb (88 kg)	August 30, 1943	Hiram College
SF	45, 50	Rich Parks	6 ft 7 in (2.01 m)	235 lb (107 kg)	October 28, 1943	Saint Louis
PF	30	Willie Porter	6 ft 7 in (2.01 m)	205 lb (93 kg)	July 3, 1941	Tennessee State
F		John Postley	6 ft 5 in (1.96 m)	220 lb (100 kg)	May 30, 1940	Bethune–Cookman
PG	45	Herschell Turner	6 ft 2 in (1.88 m)	195 lb (88 kg)	March 29, 1938	Nebraska
PG	22	Steve Vacendak	6 ft 1 in (1.85 m)	185 lb (84 kg)	August 15, 1944	Duke
SG	10	Chico Vaughn	6 ft 2 in (1.88 m)	190 lb (86 kg)	February 19, 1940	Southern Illinois
PF	32	Trooper Washington	6 ft 7 in (2.01 m)	215 lb (98 kg)	April 21, 1944	Cheyney
F	14	Dexter Westbrook	6 ft 8 in (2.03 m)	190 lb (86 kg)	1943	Providence
PG	44	Charlie Williams	6 ft 0 in (1.83 m)	165 lb (75 kg)	September 5, 1943	Seattle
PF	24	Leroy Wright	6 ft 9 in (2.06 m)	215 lb (98 kg)	May 6, 1938	Pacific

Coaches
Head coach
- Vince Cazzetta

Legend
- (DP) Unsigned draft pick
- (FA) Free agent
- (S) Suspended
- Injured

Roster

== Season standings ==
Team	W	L	PCT.	GB
Pittsburgh Pipers *	54	24	.692	—
Minnesota Muskies *	50	28	.641	4
Indiana Pacers *	38	40	.487	16
Kentucky Colonels *	36	42	.462	18
New Jersey Americans	36	42	.462	18

== ABA Playoffs ==
ABA Eastern Division Semifinals

Game	Date	Location	Score	Record	Attendance
1	March 25	Pittsburgh	146–127	1–0	2,189
2	March 26	Indiana	121–108	2–0	3,684
3	March 27	Pittsburgh	133–114	3–0	3,141

Pipers win series, 3–0

ABA Division Finals

Game	Date	Location	Score	Record	Attendance
1	April 4	Pittsburgh	125–117	1–0	3,159
2	April 6	Pittsburgh	123–137	1–1	2,123
3	April 10	Minnesota	107–99	2–1	8,357
4	April 13	Minnesota	117–108	3–1	3,787
5	April 14	Pittsburgh	114–105	4–1	3,350

Pipers win series, 4–1

ABA Finals

Game	Date	Location	Score	Record	Attendance
1	April 18	Pittsburgh	120–112	1–0	2,665
2	April 20	Pittsburgh	100–109	1–1	3,877
3	April 24	New Orleans	101–109	1–2	6,300
4	April 25	New Orleans	106–105 (OT)	2–2	7,000
5	April 27	Pittsburgh	108–111	2–3	3,347
6	May 1	New Orleans	118–112	3–3	7,200
7	May 4	Pittsburgh	122–113	4–3	11,457

Pipers win championship series, 4–3

In six out of the 15 playoff games he played, Connie Hawkins was the lead scorer. As such, he was named Playoffs MVP. Hawkins would be elected to the Naismith Memorial Basketball Hall of Fame in 1992. As it turned out, this would be his only championship.

== Awards, records, and honors ==
- 1968 ABA All-Star Game
  - Connie Hawkins
  - Chico Vaughn
- Most Valuable Player
  - Connie Hawkins
