= Scott Chew =

American politician

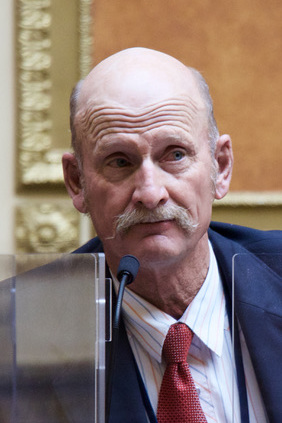

Member of the Utah House of Representatives
- Incumbent
- Assumed office January 1, 2015
- Preceded by: John Mathis
- Constituency: 55th district (2015–2023); 68th district (2023–present)

Personal details
- Born: Utah
- Party: Republican
- Education: Utah State University
- Profession: Rancher

Scott Chew (born April 15 in Utah) is an American politician and a Republican member of the Utah House of Representatives representing District 68.

== Early life, education, and qualifications ==
Chew was born in the Uintah Basin area of Utah. He attended Utah State University. He is currently the Owner/Operator of Chew Ranch/Chew Livestock Family Co-op. He was appointed by the Governor to the Agriculture, Natural & Recreational Lands Team-along with the Wildlife Nominating Committee. He was a chairman of the Uintah Basin Conservation District for 5 years. Chew has been the co-chairman for the Uintah Basin Applied Resource Management for 11 years, along with being a Utah Farm Bureau Board Member for 12 years. He was also on the Farm Service Committee for 9 years (8 of those as chair).

== Political career ==
2014 Chew defeated Tod Tesar in the Republican convention and was unopposed in the November 4, 2014 General election.

During the 2016 General Session Chew served on the House Natural Resources, Agriculture, and Environment Committee, House Public Utilities, Energy, and Technology Committee, and Natural Resources, Agriculture, and Environmental Quality Appropriations Subcommittee. During the interim, he serves on the Natural Resources, Agriculture, and Environment Interim Committee and the Public Utilities, Energy, and Technology Interim Committee.

== 2016 sponsored legislation ==
Bill number	Bill title	Status
HB0178	Legal Notice Amendments	House/ filed – 3/10/2016
HCR006	Concurrent Resolution Celebrating the Utah Farm Bureau Centennial	Governor Signed – 3/1/2016

In 2016, Chew floor sponsored SB 17 Revenue and Taxation Amendments, SB 118 Uintah Basin Air Quality Research Project, SB 134 Oil and Gas Conservation Account Amendments, and SB 159 Severance Tax Exemption Extension.
