= Cal Graham =

American basketball player

Personal information
- Born: June 7, 1944 (age 82)
- Listed height: 6 ft 2 in (1.88 m)
- Listed weight: 195 lb (88 kg)

Career information
- High school: Morris (Bronx, New York)
- College: Gannon (1964–1967)
- Position: Guard
- Number: 20

Career history
- 1967–1968: Pittsburgh Pipers
- Stats at Basketball Reference

James Calvin Graham (born June 7, 1944) is an American retired professional basketball player who spent one season in the American Basketball Association (ABA) as a member of the Pittsburgh Pipers during the 1967–68 season. He attended Gannon University.
