= John Austin (basketball) =

American basketball player (born 1944)

Personal information
- Born: August 31, 1944 (age 82) Washington, D.C.
- Listed height: 6 ft 0 in (1.83 m)
- Listed weight: 170 lb (77 kg)

Career information
- High school: DeMatha (Hyattsville, Maryland)
- College: Boston College (1963–1966)
- NBA draft: 1966: 4th round, 38th overall pick
- Drafted by: Boston Celtics
- Playing career: 1966–1969
- Position: Point guard
- Number: 34, 33

Career history
- 1966: Baltimore Bullets
- 1966–1967: Scranton Miners
- 1967–1968: New Jersey Americans
- 1968–1969: Scranton Miners

Career highlights
- First-team All-American – USBWA (1965); Second-team All-American – NABC (1966); Third-team All-American – AP, NABC (1965); Third-team All-American – UPI (1966); First-team Parade All-American (1962)

Career NBA and ABA statistics
- Points: 340 (7.6 ppg)
- Rebounds: 71 (1.6 rpg)
- Assists: 62 (1.4 apg)
- Stats at NBA.com
- Stats at Basketball Reference

John W. Austin (born August 31, 1944) is a retired American basketball player.

Born in Washington, D.C., Austin played at DeMatha Catholic High School in Hyattsville, Maryland, then collegiately for Boston College, the first African American basketball player in Boston College's history. During a 107–92 victory over Georgetown at the Roberts Center in Chestnut Hill, Massachusetts, on February 21, 1964, Austin made history by scoring 49 points, setting a Boston College single-game record scoring record as well as the record for points scored against Georgetown by an opponent in a single game. Both records still stood as of 2018.

The Boston Celtics selected Austin in the fourth round (38th pick overall) of the 1966 NBA draft. He played for the Baltimore Bullets in the National Basketball Association for four games in 1966 and the New Jersey Americans in the American Basketball Association for 41 games in 1967–1968.

== Career statistics ==
Legend
GP	Games played	GS	Games started	MPG	Minutes per game
FG%	Field goal percentage	3P%	3-point field goal percentage	FT%	Free throw percentage
RPG	Rebounds per game	APG	Assists per game	SPG	Steals per game
BPG	Blocks per game	PPG	Points per game	**Bold**	Career high

=== NBA/ABA ===
==== Regular season ====
Year	Team	GP	MPG	FG%	3P%	FT%	RPG	APG	PPG
1966–67	Baltimore (NBA)	4	15.3	.227		**.813**	**1.8**	1.0	5.8
1967–68	New Jersey (ABA)	**41**	**16.9**	**.387**	.000	.721	1.6	**1.4**	**7.7**
Career		45	16.7	.375	.000	.731	1.6	1.4	7.6
