= Mel Nowell =

American basketball player (born 1939)

Personal information
- Born: December 27, 1939 (age 86) Columbus, Ohio, U.S.
- Listed height: 6 ft 2 in (1.88 m)
- Listed weight: 170 lb (77 kg)

Career information
- High school: East (Columbus, Ohio)
- College: Ohio State (1959–1962)
- NBA draft: 1962: 12th round, 90th overall pick
- Drafted by: Chicago Zephyrs
- Playing career: 1962–1968
- Position: Point guard / shooting guard
- Number: 20, 27

Career history
- 1962–1963: Chicago Zephyrs
- 1963–1964: Wilkes-Barre Barons
- 1966–1967: Columbus Comets
- 1967–1968: New Jersey Americans

Career highlights
- NCAA champion (1960)

Career NBA and ABA statistics
- Points: 963 (8.4 ppg)
- Rebounds: 260 (2.3 rpg)
- Assists: 239 (2.1 apg)
- Stats at NBA.com
- Stats at Basketball Reference

Melvyn P. Nowell (born December 27, 1939) is an American former professional basketball player.

Born in Columbus, Ohio, Nowell played for the Ohio State Buckeyes basketball team that won the 1960 NCAA championship. He played with three Hall of Famers and Hall of Fame Coach Fred Taylor. He later played in the National Basketball Association (NBA) for the Chicago Zephyrs and in the American Basketball Association (ABA).

A 6'1 guard, Nowell was a high school star at Columbus East 1957–1958. His outside shooting and one-on-one skills were enough to rate him the #2 player in Ohio after Jerry Lucas. Fielding numerous scholarship offers, Nowell decided to follow Lucas to Ohio State in a historic recruiting class that later also included John Havlicek and Bobby Knight. Starting with fellow sophomores Lucas and Havlicek, Nowell's shooting was a key element in Ohio State's run to the 1960 NCAA title. He was named to the 1960 All-Tournament Team.

Ohio State's 1960–61 team went undefeated until the NCAA Final. Ohio State's 1961–62 team also reached the NCAA Final.

Nowell's shooting ability was such that he could have been a big scorer at another school, a fact that could have led to a bigger pro career. Instead, he played with or for four future Hall of Famers, went to three straight NCAA Finals, winning one in 1960. All three years, the Ohio State Buckeyes were undefeated at home at St. John Arena.

== Career statistics ==
Legend
GP	Games played	GS	Games started	MPG	Minutes per game
FG%	Field goal percentage	3P%	3-point field goal percentage	FT%	Free throw percentage
RPG	Rebounds per game	APG	Assists per game	SPG	Steals per game
BPG	Blocks per game	PPG	Points per game	**Bold**	Career high

=== NBA/ABA ===
==== Regular season ====
Year	Team	GP	MPG	FG%	3P%	FT%	RPG	APG	PPG
1962–63	Chicago	39	15.1	.388		.727	1.7	**2.2**	5.9
1967–68	New Jersey (ABA)	**76**	**20.5**	**.402**	.281	**.826**	**2.5**	2.0	**9.6**
Career		115	18.6	.398	.281	.803	2.3	2.1	8.4
