= Dexter Westbrook =

American basketball player

Personal information
- Born: 1943 (age 82–83) Mount Vernon, New York, U.S.
- Listed height: 6 ft 8 in (2.03 m)
- Listed weight: 190 lb (86 kg)

Career information
- High school: Laurinburg Institute (Laurinburg, North Carolina)
- College: Providence (1964–1965)
- NBA draft: 1967: 5th round, 44th overall pick
- Drafted by: Baltimore Bullets
- Position: Power forward
- Number: 22, 14

Career history
- 1967: New Jersey Americans
- 1967: Pittsburgh Pipers
- Stats at Basketball Reference

Dexter Westbrook (born 1943) is an American former professional basketball player. He played for the New Jersey Americans in seven games before being acquired by the Pittsburgh Pipers, for whom he played in five games, in the beginning of the 1967–68 ABA season. He had been drafted by the Baltimore Bullets in the 1967 NBA draft (44th overall) after a collegiate career at Providence College. He was only able to play his sophomore season for the Friars in 1964–65 before academic issues forced him off the team for the remainder of his collegiate career.

== Career statistics ==
Legend
GP	Games played	GS	Games started	MPG	Minutes per game
FG%	Field goal percentage	3P%	3-point field goal percentage	FT%	Free throw percentage
RPG	Rebounds per game	APG	Assists per game	SPG	Steals per game
BPG	Blocks per game	PPG	Points per game	**Bold**	Career high

=== ABA ===
==== Regular season ====
Year	Team	GP	MPG	FG%	3P%	FT%	RPG	APG	PPG
1967–68	New Jersey	**7**	8.4	**.632**	–	**.778**	1.3	.3	**4.4**
1967–68	Pittsburgh	5	**13.6**	.350	'–	.600	**2.8**	**.6**	3.4
Career		12	10.6	.487	–	.714	1.9	.4	4.0
