= Al Beard =

American basketball player (born 1942)

Personal information
- Born: April 27, 1942 (age 84) Fort Valley, Georgia
- Listed height: 6 ft 10 in (2.08 m)
- Listed weight: 200 lb (91 kg)

Career information
- High school: H. A. Hunt (Fort Valley, Georgia)
- College: Norfolk State
- Playing career: 1967–1971
- Position: Center
- Number: 41, 22

Career history
- 1967–1968: New Jersey Americans
- 1967–1970: Bridgeport / Binghamton Flyers
- 1970–1971: Wilkes-Barre Barons
- Stats at Basketball Reference

Albert Beard (born April 27, 1942) is a retired American basketball player.

Born in Fort Valley, Georgia, Beard played college basketball for the Norfolk State University.

He played for the New Jersey Americans (1967–68) in the American Basketball Association for 12 games.

Beard played in the Eastern Professional Basketball League (EPBL) / Eastern Basketball Association (EBA) for the Bridgeport / Binghamton Flyers and Wilkes-Barre Barons from 1967 to 1971.

== Career statistics ==
Legend
GP	Games played	GS	Games started	MPG	Minutes per game
FG%	Field goal percentage	3P%	3-point field goal percentage	FT%	Free throw percentage
RPG	Rebounds per game	APG	Assists per game	SPG	Steals per game
BPG	Blocks per game	PPG	Points per game	**Bold**	Career high

=== ABA ===
==== Regular season ====
Year	Team	GP	MPG	FG%	3P%	FT%	RPG	APG	PPG
1967–68	New Jersey	12	9.8	.522	–	.545	3.8	.0	2.5
