= John Mathis =

American politician

Member of the Utah House of Representatives from the 55th district
- Incumbent
- Assumed office January 1, 2005
- Preceded by: Jack Seitz

Personal details
- Born: Sevier County
- Party: Republican
- Spouse: Wendy Mathis
- Education: Brigham Young University; Colorado State University
- Profession: Veterinary physician

John G. Mathis is an American politician and a Republican member of the Utah House of Representatives representing District 55 since January 1, 2005.

== Early life and career ==
Mathis earned his bachelor's degree from Brigham Young University and his Doctor of Veterinary Medicine from Colorado State University. Mathis lives in Vernal, Utah with his wife, Wendy, and he works as a veterinarian at Ashley Valley Veterinary Clinic. Mathis worked with Utah State University to establish Utah's first four year veterinary program, breaking ground in an official ceremony May 31, 2024.

== Political career ==
- 2012 Mathis was challenged but selected by the Republican convention, and unopposed for the November 6, 2012 General election, winning with 12,252 votes.
- 2004 When District 55 Republican Representative Jack Seitz retired and left the seat open, Mathis was selected by the Republican convention from two candidates for the four-way November 2, 2004 General election, which he won with 9,560 votes (80.6%) against Green candidate John Weisheit (who had run for the seat in 2002), Constitution candidate Dale Flake, and Libertarian candidate Ronald Regehr.
- 2006 Mathis was unopposed for the 2006 Republican Primary and won the November 7, 2006 General election against returning 2004 Constitution candidate Dale Flake.
- 2008 Mathis unopposed for the June 24, 2008 Republican Primary and won the four-way November 4, 2008 General election with 9,622 votes (74.7%) against Democratic nominee Wayne Hoskisson, Constitution candidate Daniel Ray, and returning 2004 Green candidate Ronald Regehr.
- 2010 Mathis was unopposed for the June 22, 2010 Republican Primary, and won the three-way November 2, 2010 General election with 7,632 votes (76.5%) against Democratic nominee Mike Binyon and Constitution candidate George Hill.

During the 2013 and 2014 legislative sessions, Representative Mathis served on the Natural Resources, Agriculture, and Environmental Quality Appropriations Subcommittee, the House Government Operations Committee, the House Natural Resources, Agriculture, and Environment Committee, and the House Rules Committee. During the interim, Mathis served on the Government Operations Interim Committee and the Natural Resources, Agriculture, and Environment Interim Committee. Representative Mathis is also a member of the Rural Development Legislative Liaison Committee.

== 2014 Sponsored Legislation ==
Bill number	Bill name	Bill status
HB0005	Natural Resources, Agriculture, and Environmental Quality Base Budget	Governor Signed - 2/19/2014
HB0130	Mobility and Pedestrian Vehicles	Governor Signed - 3/31/2014

Mathis also floor sponsored SB0073S03 Agricultural Environmental Amendments, SB0217 Public Utilities Amendments, SB0231 Agricultural Amendments, and SJR004 Joint Resolution on Water Rights on Grazing Lands.
