= Hank Whitney =

American basketball player (1939–2020)

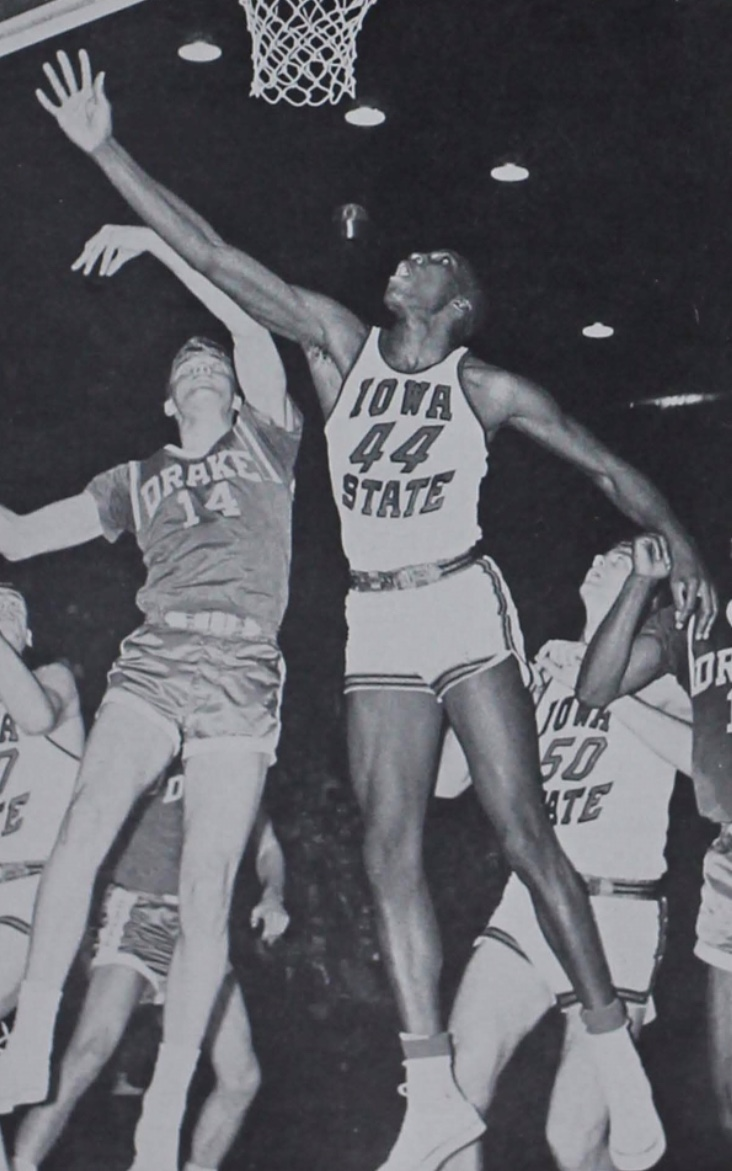
- Whitney as a senior at Iowa State

Personal information
- Born: April 28, 1939 Brooklyn, New York, U.S.
- Died: April 5, 2020 (aged 80)
- Listed height: 6 ft 7 in (2.01 m)
- Listed weight: 230 lb (104 kg)

Career information
- High school: HS of Fashion Industries (Manhattan, New York)
- College: Iowa State (1958–1961)
- NBA draft: 1961: 4th round, 37th overall pick
- Drafted by: Syracuse Nationals
- Playing career: 1961–1973
- Position: Power forward
- Number: 44, 11, 12, 13

Career history
- 1961–1962: Los Angeles Jets
- 1962: Chicago Majors
- 1962: Pittsburgh Rens
- 1963–1968: Allentown Jets
- 1968–1969: New Jersey Americans / New York Nets
- 1969: Houston Mavericks
- 1969–1970: Carolina Cougars
- 1970–1971: Allentown Jets
- 1971–1972: Hazelton Bits
- 1972–1973: Garden State Colonials

Career highlights
- 2× EPBL champion (1963, 1965); First-team All-Big Eight (1961)
- Stats at Basketball Reference

Henry Lee Whitney (April 28, 1939 – April 5, 2020) was an American professional basketball player.

Whitney began his career with stints at several short-lived American Basketball League teams—the Los Angeles Jets, Chicago Majors, and Pittsburgh Rens—before spending a few seasons with the Allentown Jets. He then played for the New Jersey Americans / New York Nets.
