= Dan Anderson (basketball, born 1943) =

American basketball player

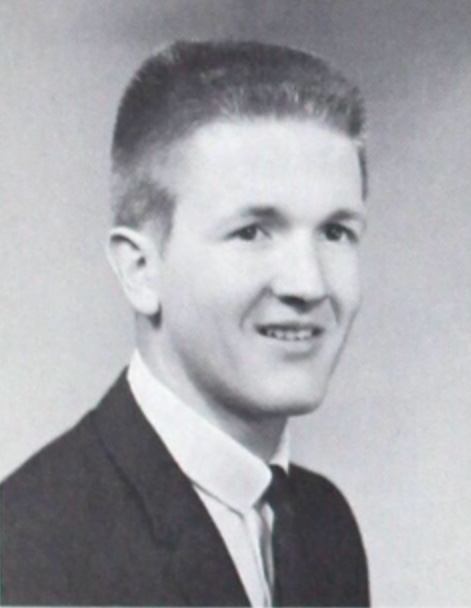
- Anderson from the 1965 Augsburgian

Personal information
- Born: February 15, 1943 (age 83) Minneapolis, Minnesota, U.S.
- Listed height: 6 ft 10 in (2.08 m)
- Listed weight: 230 lb (104 kg)

Career information
- High school: Portland (Portland, North Dakota)
- College: Augsburg (1961–1965)
- NBA draft: 1965: 12th round, 89th overall pick
- Drafted by: Philadelphia 76ers
- Playing career: 1967–1969
- Position: Center
- Number: 20, 25

Career history
- 1967–1968: New Jersey Americans/New York Nets
- 1968–1969: Kentucky Colonels
- 1969: Minnesota Pipers
- Stats at Basketball Reference

Daniel W. Anderson (born February 15, 1943) is an American former basketball player.

Born in Minneapolis, Minnesota, he played basketball at Portland high school in North Dakota and Augsburg College (now Augsburg University).

He was selected by the Philadelphia 76ers with the 89th pick overall of the 1965 NBA draft.

He played for the Goodyear Wingfoots AAU team in Akron, Ohio during the 1965–66 and 1966–67 seasons.

He joined the American Basketball Association in its inaugural season and played for the New Jersey Americans (1967–68), New York Nets, Kentucky Colonels and Minnesota Pipers (1968–69) for a total of 140 games.

In high school Anderson set a single season conference scoring record his senior year.

At Augsburg he set a state of Minnesota career scoring record for all colleges and universities in the state scoring 2052 points and was named player of the year in the Minnesota Intercollegiate Athletic Conference three times. The Auggies represented Minnesota in the NAIA National Tournament in Kansas City in 1963 and 1965.

The Goodyear Wingfoots team he played on won the Intercontinental Cup in Europe in 1967 and the US AAU Championship that same year.

Anderson scored 41 points in his first professional game, which was also the Nets' first game as a franchise. He averaged 12.2 points per game and 9.4 rebounds per game during his 140-game career.

After basketball Anderson became a successful businessman serving as president and later chairman of AdvisorNet Financial group for over 30 years. In 2015 he completed a 12-year term as a regent of Augsburg University, his alma mater.
