= Bruce Spraggins =

American basketball player (1939–2021)

Personal information
- Born: August 31, 1939 Williamsburg, Virginia, U.S.
- Died: September 12, 2021 (aged 82) Charles City, Virginia, U.S.
- Listed height: 6 ft 5 in (1.96 m)
- Listed weight: 188 lb (85 kg)

Career information
- High school: Bruton Heights (Williamsburg, Virginia)
- College: Virginia Union (1958–1961)
- NBA draft: 1961: 5th round, 47th overall pick
- Drafted by: Philadelphia Warriors
- Playing career: 1961–1971
- Position: Small forward
- Number: 30

Career history
- 1961–1962: Washington/New York/Philadelphia Tapers
- 1963–1966: Trenton Colonials
- 1966–1967: New Haven Elms
- 1967–1968: New Jersey Americans
- 1968–1971: New Haven Elms / Hamden Bics

Career highlights
- All-EPBL First Team (1969); All-EPBL Second Team (1967, 1970); 2× First-team all-CIAA (1960, 1961)
- Stats at Basketball Reference

Warren Bruce Spraggins (August 31, 1939 – September 12, 2021) was an American professional basketball player. In college, he led the NCAA Small Colleges in scoring in 1960–61 and was a two-time first-team All-Central Intercollegiate Athletic Association player for the Virginia Union Panthers. Professionally, Spraggins' career lasted from 1961 to 1971 spanning three different leagues (American Basketball League, Eastern Professional Basketball League (EPBL) / Eastern Basketball Association (EBA), and American Basketball Association). Spraggins was selected to the All-EPBL First Team in 1969 and Second Team in 1967 and 1970.

Spraggins died on September 12, 2021, in Charles City, Virginia, at age 82.
