= Bob McIntyre (basketball) =

American basketball player

Personal information
- Born: January 23, 1944 (age 82) Bayside, New York, U.S.
- Listed height: 6 ft 6 in (1.98 m)
- Listed weight: 215 lb (98 kg)

Career information
- High school: Holy Cross (Flushing, New York)
- College: St. John's (1963–1966)
- NBA draft: 1966: 4th round, 34th overall pick
- Drafted by: St. Louis Hawks
- Playing career: 1966–1970
- Position: Small forward
- Number: 44, 27

Career history
- 1966–1967: Real Madrid
- 1967–1968: New Jersey Americans
- 1968–1969: Allentown Jets
- 1969–1970: New York Nets

Career highlights
- Euroleague champion (1967); Copa del Rey champion (1967); Second-team Parade All-American (1962)
- Stats at Basketball Reference

Robert McIntyre (born January 23, 1944) is an American former professional basketball player. He played in the American Basketball Association for the New Jersey Americans / New York Nets, as well as in the Continental Basketball Association for the Allentown Jets and in FIBA Euroleague for Real Madrid. While with Real Madrid for the 1966–67 season, McIntyre won a Euroleague championship.
