= Johnny Mathis (basketball) =

American basketball player (1943–2023)

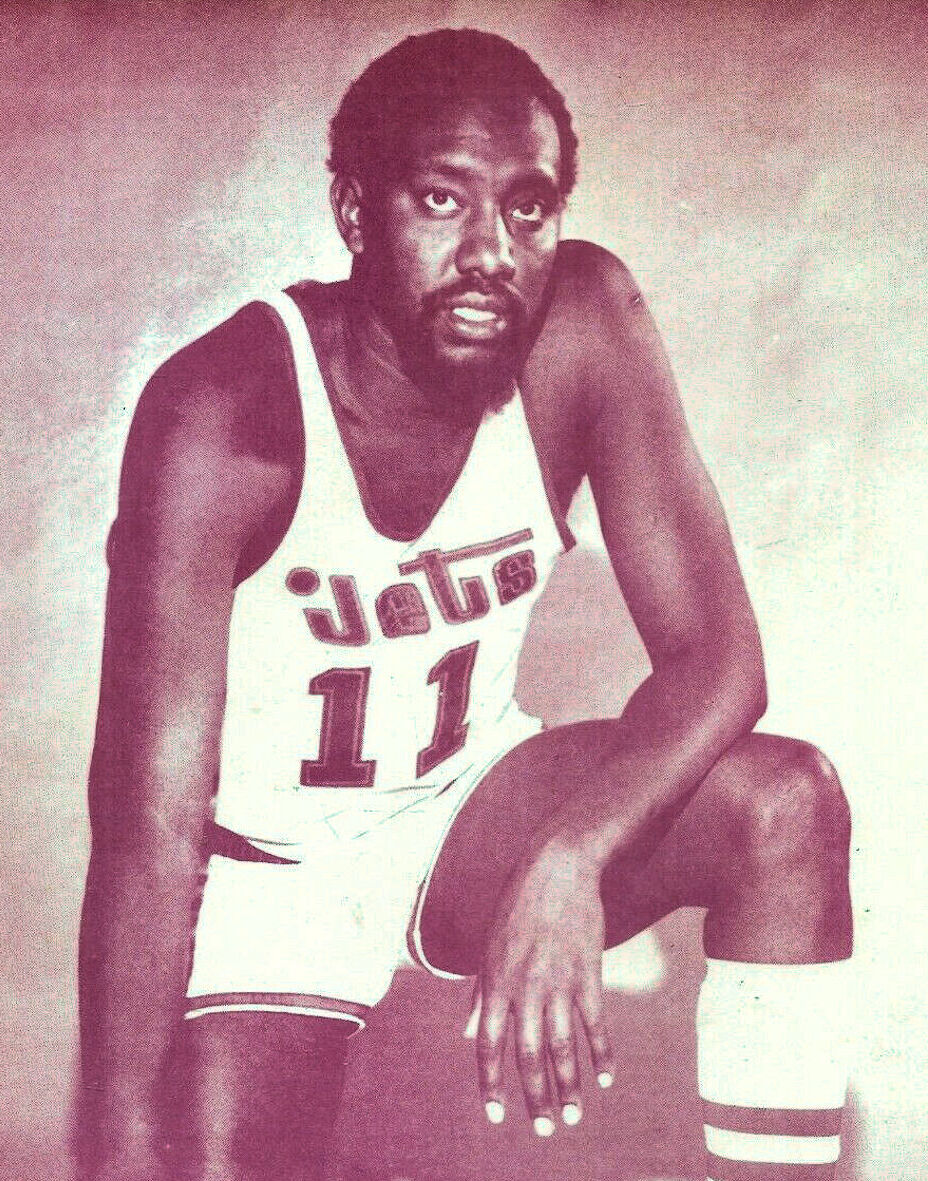
- Mathis with the Allentown Jets in 1971

Personal information
- Born: July 14, 1943 Eastman, Georgia, U.S.
- Died: September 7, 2023 (aged 80)
- Listed height: 6 ft 6 in (1.98 m)
- Listed weight: 220 lb (100 kg)

Career information
- High school: Peabody (Eastman, Georgia)
- College: Savannah State (1960–1964)
- NBA draft: 1964: undrafted
- Position: Power forward
- Number: 32

Career history
- 1967–1968: New Jersey Americans
- 1968–1969: Allentown Jets
- 1969–1971: Hamden Bics
- 1971–1972: Allentown Jets
- 1972–1973: Scranton Apollos

Career highlights
- EBA champion (1972); All-EPBL First Team (1970); 2× All-EBA Second Team (1971, 1972)
- Stats at Basketball Reference

Johnny C. Mathis (July 14, 1943 – September 7, 2023) was an American basketball player. He played one season in the American Basketball Association (ABA).

Mathis played college basketball at Savannah State. Following the close of his college career, he played two seasons in Spain. He returned to the United States to play for the New Jersey Americans of the ABA for the 1967–68 season, averaging 3.4 points and 3.8 rebounds over 51 games. Mathis played in the Eastern Professional Basketball League (EPBL) / Eastern Basketball Association (EBA) for the Allentown Jets and Hamden Bics from 1968 to 1973. He won an EBA championship with the Jets in 1972. He was selected to the All-EPBL First Team in 1970 and All-EBA Second Team in 1971 and 1972.

Mathis became a high school coach for John F. Kennedy High School in New York City, winning over 600 games in his career. He was inducted into the New York City Basketball Hall of Fame in 2015.

Mathis died on September 7, 2023, at the age of 80.
