= List of Alpha Kappa Alpha chapters =

Alpha Kappa Alpha is the first Greek letter sorority for African American college students. The sorority was founded on January 15, 1908, at Howard University.

== Collegiate chapters ==
In the following list of chapters, active chapters are indicated in bold and inactive chapters and institutions are in italics.

Chapter	Charter date and range	Founding Location	City	State or territory	Status	Ref.
**Alpha**	January 15, 1908	Howard University	Washington	District of Columbia	Active	
**Beta**	October 8, 1913	Chicago Citywide	Chicago	Illinois	Active	(Note: This chapter includes the University of Chicago, the University of Illinois at Chicago, Loyola University Chicago, Roosevelt University, and Columbia College Chicago.)
**Gamma**	February 12, 1914	University of Illinois Urbana-Champaign	Champaign	Illinois	Active	(Note: Chapter started as a mixed collegiate and graduate chapter. In April 1949, the graduates split off to form the Epsilon Epsilon Omega chapter and Gamma became a collegiate chapter.)
**Delta**	February 15, 1915	University of Kansas	Lawrence	Kansas	Active	
**Epsilon**	May 3, 1924	Boston Citywide	Boston	Massachusetts	Active	(Note: This chapter includes Babson College, Bentley University, Boston College, Boston University, Brandeis University, Emerson College, Emmanuel College, Simmons University, Suffolk University, and Tufts University.)
**Zeta**	1916	Wilberforce University	Wilberforce	Ohio	Active	
Theta (First)					Reissued	
Iota	May 8, 1918	University of Pittsburgh	Pittsburgh	Pennsylvania	Active	
**Theta (Second)**	February 2, 1921	Ohio State University	Columbus	Ohio	Active	
**Kappa**	February 14, 1920	Indianapolis Citywide	Indianapolis	Indiana	Active	(Note: Chapter formed from Butler University, Franklin College, Indiana University Indianapolis, Purdue University in Indianapolis, Marian University, and the University of Indianapolis.)
Xi (First)	December 15, 1922 – 1949	Detroit Citywide	Detroit	Michigan	Inactive, Reissued	(Note: This was formed as both a collegiate and graduate chapter. In 1930, the graduates split off and formed the Rho Omega chapter. Some collegiate members split off to form the Beta Mu chapter at Detroit City College (now Wayne State University) in 1936. In 1949, the charter for Xi was transferred to Michigan Normal Teachers College (now Eastern Michigan University) and the chapter closed.)
**Omicron**	April 9, 1921	University of Cincinnati	Cincinnati	Ohio	Active	
**Pi**	April 12, 1921	Fisk University	Nashville	Tennessee	Active	(Note: Chapter was originally a mixed collegiate and graduate chapter at, serving Fisk University and Meharry Medical College. In 1927, the graduates formed Alpha Delta Omega chapter, leaving Pi chapter for the undergraduates at Fisk.)
**Rho**	August 21, 1921	University of California, Berkeley	Berkeley	California	Active	
**Tau**	December 16, 1922	Indiana University Bloomington	Bloomington	Indiana	Active	
Eta (Second)	1922–19xx ?	University of Minnesota	Minneapolis	Minnesota	Inactive, Reissued	
**Lambda (Second)**	April 22, 1922	New York Citywide	New York City	New York	Active	(Note: Chapter includes Barnard College, Baruch College, City College of New York, Columbia University, Columbia University, Hunter College, New York University, and Touro College.)
Mu (Second)	1922–1945	Temple University	Philadelphia	Pennsylvania	Inactive, Reissued	
**Nu (Second)**	December 26, 1922	West Virginia State University	Institute	West Virginia	Active	
Sigma (Second)	1922–19xx ?	University of Southern California	Los Angeles	California	Inactive	
**Upsilon**	May 25, 1923	Washburn University	Topeka	Kansas	Active	
**Phi**	December 22, 1924	Wiley College	Marshall	Texas	Active	
**Chi**	1925	Talladega College	Talladega	Alabama	Active	
**Omega**	December 1, 1925	Cleveland Citywide	Cleveland	Ohio	Active	(Note: Chapter was formed to serve members from Western Reserve University, Oberlin College, and Cleveland College.) (Note: Chapter includes Baldwin Wallace University, Case Western Reserve University, Cleveland Institute of Art, Cleveland State University, John Carroll University, Notre Dame College, and Ursuline College.)
Psi (First)	1925–1947	University of Pennsylvania	Philadelphia	Pennsylvania	Inactive, Reissued	
Alpha Alpha					Inactive ?	
Alpha Beta (First)					Reissued	
**Alpha Gamma**	December 19, 1925	University of California, Los Angeles	Los Angeles	California	Active	
**Alpha Delta**	March 15, 1926	Morgan State University	Baltimore	Maryland	Active	
**Alpha Epsilon**	1926	Virginia State University	Ettrick	Virginia	Active	
Alpha Zeta (First)	1925–1933	Atlanta Citywide	Atlanta	Georgia	Inactive, Reissued	
**Alpha Eta**	April 7, 1928	Virginia Union University	Richmond	Virginia	Active	
Alpha Theta (First)	1927–19xx ?	University of Nebraska–Lincoln	Lincoln	Nebraska	Inactive, Reissued	
Alpha Iota (First)					Inactive, Reissued	
**Alpha Kappa**	November 9, 1928	Denver Citywide	Denver	Colorado	Active	(Note: Chapter includes the University of Colorado at Boulder, the University of Colorado at Denver, University of Northern Colorado, and the University of Denver.)
**Alpha Lambda**	1928	University of Toledo	Toledo	Ohio	Active	
**Alpha Iota (Second)**	1930	Lincoln University	Jefferson City	Missouri	Active	
Alpha Mu (First)	1930–19xx ?	Samuel Huston College	Austin	Texas	Inactive, Reissued	
Alpha Nu (First)	1931–193x ?	Eastern Michigan University	Ypsilanti	Michigan	Inactive, Reissued	
**Alpha Pi**	1930	Clark Atlanta University	Atlanta	Georgia	Active	
**Alpha Xi**	1930 (April 18, 1930)	Livingstone College	Salisbury	North Carolina	Active	
Alpha Omicron (First)	1931–1940	San Francisco State University	San Francisco	California	Inactive, Reissued	
Alpha Rho (First)	1931–19xx ?	Wichita Citywide	Wichita	Kansas	Inactive, Reissued	
Alpha Sigma (First)	1931–-1946	Phoenix Areawide	Phoenix	Arizona	Inactive, Reissue	
Alpha Tau (First)	1931–193x ?	Dayton Citywide	Dayton	Ohio	Inactive, Reissued	
Alpha Upsilon (First)	1931–19xx ?	Pittsburgh Citywide	Pittsburgh	Pennsylvania	Inactive, Reissued	
**Alpha Phi**	1931	North Carolina A&T State University	Greensboro	North Carolina	Active	
**Alpha Chi**	1932	North Carolina Central University	Durham	North Carolina	Active	
**Alpha Psi**	1931	Tennessee State University	Nashville	Tennessee	Active	
**Beta Alpha**	1932	Florida A&M University	Tallahassee	Florida	Active	
Beta Beta (First)	1932–195x ?	Akron Citywide	Akron	Ohio	Inactive, Reissued	(Note: Chapter had both collegiate and graduate members. When the sorority discontinued mixed chapters, the graduates formed the Zeta Theta Omega chapter.)
Beta Gamma (First)	November 22, 1932 – 1971	Des Moines Citywide	Des Moines	Iowa	Inactive, Reissued	(Note: This chapter included both graduate and collegiate members. In 1971, it went inactive and split into Eta Tau at Drake University and the Iota Zeta Omega graduate chapter.)
**Beta Delta**	November 12, 1932	Saint Louis Citywide	St. Louis	Missiouri	Active	(Note: Chapter includes Fontbonne University, Harris-Stowe State University, Lindenwood University, Maryville University, Missouri Baptist University, Saint Louis College of Pharmacy, Saint Louis University, Washington University in St. Louis, and Webster University.)
**Beta Epsilon**	1932	Louisville Citywide	Louisville	Kentucky	Active	
**Beta Zeta**	1932	Kentucky State University	Frankfort	Kentucky	Active	
**Beta Eta**	1932	University of Michigan	Ann Arbor	Michigan	Active	
**Beta Theta**	August 1, 1933	Seattle University	Seattle	Washington	Active	
**Beta Theta**	August 1, 1933	University of Washington	Seattle	Washington	Active	
Beta Iota (First)	1934–19xx ?	Portsmouth, Ohio Citywide	Portsmouth	Ohio	Inactive, Reissued	
Beta Kappa (First)	1935–19xx ?	San Diego Citywide	San Diego	California	Inactive, Reissued	(Note: Chapter was a mix of collegiate and graduate members. In 1948, the sorority did away with mixed chapters and the graduates formed Epsilon Xi Omega in 1949.)
**Beta Lambda**	April 9, 1936	University of the District of Columbia	Washington	District of Columbia	Active	(Note: Chartered at Miner Teachers College, a teacher's college that was the first component of the eventual UDC to be chartered.)
Beta Mu	1936–xxxx ?	Wayne State University	Detroit	Michigan	Inactive	(Note: Formed from the Xi chapter, a citywide chapter .)
Beta Nu	1937–xxxx ?	Pittsburg State University	Pittsburg	Kansas	Inactive	
Beta Xi (First)	1937–1940	Cornell University	Ithaca	New York	Inactive, Reissued	
**Beta Omicron**	1938	Bluefield State University	Bluefield	West Virginia	Active	
**Beta Pi**	1938	Alabama State University	Montgomery	Alabama	Active	
**Beta Rho**	1938	Shaw University	Raleigh	North Carolina	Active	
**Beta Sigma**	1938	South Carolina State University	Orangeburg	South Carolina	Active	
**Beta Tau**	1938	LeMoyne–Owen College	Memphis	Tennessee	Active	
**Beta Upsilon**	1938	Dillard University	New Orleans	Louisiana	Active	
Beta Phi (First)	1938–1953	Xavier University of Louisiana	New Orleans	Louisiana	Inactive, Reissued	
Alpha Zeta (Second)	1939–xxxx ?	Langston University	Langston	Oklahoma	Inactive	
Alpha Nu (Second)	1939–1953	Huston–Tillotson College	Austin	Texas	Inactive, Reissued	
Alpha Tau	1939–xxxx ?	Texas College	Tyler	Texas	Inactive	
**Beta Chi**	1939	Lane College	Jackson	Tennessee	Active	
**Beta Psi**	March 27, 1940	Southern University	Baton Rouge	Louisiana	Active	
Gamma Alpha	April 14, 1940 – xxxx ?	Philander Smith College	Little Rock	Arkansas	Inactive	
**Gamma Beta**	December 7, 1940	Omaha Citywide	Omaha	Nebraska	Active	(Note: Chapter includes Creighton University and University of Nebraska Omaha.)
Gamma Gamma	1942–xxxx ?	Morris Brown College	Atlanta	Georgia	Active	
**Alpha Beta**	1943	Fort Valley State University	Fort Valley	Georgia	Active	
**Gamma Delta**	1944	Johnson C. Smith University	Charlotte	North Carolina	Active	
**Gamma Epsilon**	June 24, 1945	Philadelphia Citywide	Philadelphia	Pennsylvania	Active	(Note: Chapter includes Drexel University, La Salle University, Philadelphia University, Saint Joseph's University, the University of Pennsylvania.)
Gamma Eta	1946–xxxx ?	Knoxville College	Knoxville	Tennessee	Inactive	
**Gamma Theta**	February 15, 1947	Hampton University	Hampton	Virginia	Active	
**Mu (Third)**	1947	Allen University	Columbia	South Carolina	Active	
Psi (Second)	1947–19xx ?	Benedict College	Columbia	South Carolina	Inactive	
**Gamma Zeta**	November 1947	Rutgers University–Newark	Newark	New Jersey	Active	(Note: Was chartered as a citywide chapter but now includes members from just two universities.)
**Gamma Zeta**	November 1947	New Jersey Institute of Technology	Newark	New Jersey	Active	(Note: Was chartered as a citywide chapter but now includes members from just two universities.)
**Gamma Iota**	1948	Buffalo Citywide	Buffalo	New York	Active	
**Gamma Kappa**	1948	Tuskegee University	Tuskegee	Alabama	Active	
**Xi (Second)**	1949	Eastern Michigan University	Ypsilanti	Michigan	Active	(Note: This chapter's charter was transferred from Xi First to Michigan Normal Teachers College (now known as Eastern Michigan University).)
**Gamma Lambda**	1949	Winston-Salem State University	Winston-Salem	North Carolina	Active	
**Gamma Mu**	1949	Alabama A&M University	Normal	Alabama	Active	
**Gamma Nu**	1949	Claflin University	Orangeburg	South Carolina	Active	
Gamma Xi	1949–xxxx ?	St. Augustine's University	Raleigh	North Carolina	Inactive	
**Gamma Omicron**	1949	Tougaloo College	Jackson	Mississippi	Active	
Gamma Pi (First)	1949–19xx ?	Iowa State University	Ames	Iowa	Inactive	
Gamma Rho	1949–xxxx ?	Jackson State University	Jackson	Mississippi	Inactive	
**Gamma Sigma**	1949	Albany State University	Albany	Georgia	Active	
Gamma Tau	April 30, 1949 – xxxx ?	Bethune–Cookman University	Daytona Beach	Florida	Inactive	
**Gamma Upsilon**	1949	Savannah State University	Savannah	Georgia	Active	
**Gamma Phi (First)**	1950–xxxx ?, xxxx ?	Alcorn State University	Lorman	Mississippi	Active	
Gamma Chi (First)	1950–19xx ?	Dayton Citywide	Dayton	Ohio	Inactive, Reissued	
**Gamma Psi**	1950	Texas Southern University	Houston	Texas	Active	
**Alpha Theta (Second)**	1951	Grambling State University	Grambling	Louisiana	Active	
Alpha Omicron (Second)	1951–xxxx ?	University of Maryland Eastern Shore	Princess Anne	Maryland	Inactive	
**Alpha Rho (Second)**	1951	University of Arkansas at Pine Bluff	Pine Bluff	Arkansas	Active	
Beta Iota (Second)	1951–19xx ?	University of Evansville	Evansville	Indiana	Inactive, Reissued	
Alpha Upsilon (Second)	1952–xxxx ?	Saint Paul's College	Lawrenceville	Virginia	Inactive	
**Beta Xi (Second)**	1952	Central State University	Wilberforce	Ohio	Active	
Delta Alpha	1952–xxxx ?	Fayetteville State College	Fayetteville	North Carolina	Active	
**Delta Beta**	1952	Southern Illinois University Carbondale	Carbondale	Illinois	Active	
**Delta Gamma**	1953	Pennsylvania State University	University Park	Pennsylvania	Active	
**Beta Kappa (Second)**	1953	Huston–Tillotson University	Houston	Texas	Active	
**Delta Delta**	1953	Youngstown State University	Youngstown	Ohio	Active	
Delta Epsilon (First)	1953–19xx ?	Detroit Citywide	Detroit	Michigan	Inactive, Reissued	
**Delta Zeta**	1954	Michigan State University	East Lansing	Michigan	Active	
**Delta Eta**	1954	Florida Memorial University	Miami Gardens	Florida	Active	
**Delta Theta**	1954	Elizabeth City State University	Elizabeth City	North Carolina	Active	
**Delta Iota**	1954	Cheyney University of Pennsylvania	Cheyney	Pennsylvania	Active	
Delta Kappa	1955–19xx ?	Bishop College	Marshall	Texas	Inactive	
**Delta Lambda**	1955	Delaware State University	Dover	Delaware	Active	
**Delta Mu**	1955	Temple University	Philadelphia	Pennsylvania	Active	
**Alpha Mu (Second)**	1955	Brooklyn Citywide	Brooklyn	New York	Active	(Note: Chapter includes Brooklyn College, Fordham University at Rose Hill, John Jay College of Criminal Justice, Long Island University, Medgar Evers College, and New York University Tandon School of Engineering.)
Delta Nu					Inactive ?	
**Delta Xi**	1959	University of Texas at Austin	Austin	Texas	Active	
Alpha Nu (Third)	1959–1972	Fresno Citywide	Fresno	California	Moved	(Note: When founded, this chapter was not based on a college campus and accepted both collegiate and graduate members in Fresno. In 1972, the graduates split off and created the Iota Omicron Omega chapter and Alpha Nu chapter moved to California State University.)
**Alpha Sigma (Second)**	1959	Pittsburgh Citywide	Pittsburgh	Pennsylvania	Active	
**Delta Omicron**	1960–19xx ?, March 28, 1981	Northern Illinois University	DeKalb	Illinois	Active	
**Delta Pi**	1961	University of Akron	Akron	Ohio	Active	
**Delta Rho**	1961	San Antonio Citywide	San Antonio	Texas	Active	(Note: Chapter includes Our Lady of the Lake University, St. Mary's University, Texas, Trinity University, University of the Incarnate Word, and University of Texas Health Science Center at San Antonio.)
Delta Epsilon (Second)	1961–xxxx ?	Norfolk State University	Norfolk	Virginia	Inactive	
Beta Beta (Second)	1962–xxxx ?	Oklahoma City Areawide	Oklahoma City	Oklahoma	Inactive	
**Delta Sigma**	March 23, 1963	Stillman College	Tuscaloosa	Alabama	Active	
**Delta Tau**	1964	University of Missouri	Columbia	Missouri	Active	
Delta Upsilon	1964–xxxx ?	Kansas City Areawide	Kansas City	Kansas	Inactive	
**Delta Phi**	1964	Ohio University	Athens	Ohio	Active	
**Delta Chi**	1965	Western Michigan University	Kalamazoo	Michigan	Active	
Delta Psi	1966–xxxx ?	Barber–Scotia College	Concord	North Carolina	Inactive	
**Epsilon Alpha**	1967	Wichita State University	Wichita	Kansas	Active	
**Epsilon Beta**	1967	University of Louisiana at Lafayette	Lafayette	Louisiana	Active	
Epsilon Gamma	1968–xxxx ?	Kent State University	Kent	Ohio	Inactive	(Note: Chapter formed by absorbing DeMilos (local), established in 1966.)
**Epsilon Delta**	1968	University of Wisconsin–Madison	Madison	Wisconsin	Active	
**Epsilon Epsilon**	1968	University of Memphis	Memphis	Tennessee	Active	
**Epsilon Zeta**	1968	Western Kentucky University	Bowling Green	Kentucky	Active	
**Epsilon Eta**	1968	Bradley University	Peoria	Illinois	Active	
**Beta Phi (Second)**	1968	Ball State University	Muncie	Indiana	Active	
**Gamma Chi (Second)**	March 1, 1969	Northwestern University	Evanston	Illinois	Active	aq
**Epsilon Theta**	1969	University of Iowa	Iowa City	Iowa	Active	
**Epsilon Iota**	1969	Southern Illinois University Edwardsville	Edwardsville	Illinois	Active	(Note: Chapter was originally the Ivy Leaf Club, a group organized in 1967 as a colony.)
**Epsilon Kappa**	1969	Coppin State University	Baltimore	Maryland	Active	
**Epsilon Lambda**	1969	University of Houston	Houston	Texas	Active	
**Epsilon Mu**	1969	University of North Texas	Denton	Texas	Active	
**Epsilon Nu**	1969	Lincoln University	Oxford	Pennsylvania	Active	
**Epsilon Xi**	1969	Indiana State University	Terre Haute	Indiana	Active	
Epsilon Omicron	1969–xxxx ?	Stetson University	DeLand	Florida	Inactive	
**Epsilon Pi**	1969	Mississippi Valley State University	Mississippi Valley State	Mississippi	Active	
**Eta (Third)**	1969	Bowie State University	Bowie	Maryland	Active	
Beta Iota (Third)	1969–xxxx ?	Northern Michigan University	Marquette	Michigan	Inactive, Reissued	
**Epsilon Rho**	1969	Purdue University	West Lafayette	Indiana	Active	
Gamma Phi (Second)	October 24, 1970 – xxxx ?	Miles College	Fairfield	Alabama	Inactive, Reissued	
**Epsilon Sigma**	1970	East Texas A&M University	Commerce	Texas	Active	(Note: Texas A&M University at Commerce changed its name to East Texas A&M University on 7 November 2024.)
**Epsilon Tau**	1970	Xavier University of Louisiana	New Orleans	Louisiana	Active	
**Epsilon Upsilon**	1970	University of South Alabama	Mobile	Alabama	Active	
**Epsilon Phi**	October 24, 1970	University of Arkansas at Little Rock	Little Rock	Arkansas	Active	
**Epsilon Chi**	1970	University of Dayton	Dayton	Ohio	Active	
**Epsilon Chi**	1970	Wright State University	Fairborn	Ohio	Active	
Epsilon Psi	1970–xxxx ?	PennWest Edinboro	Edinboro	Pennsylvania	Inactive	
**Zeta Alpha**	1970	Arizona State University	Tempe	Arizona	Active	
**Zeta Beta**	1970	Lamar University	Beaumont	Texas	Active	
Zeta Gamma	1970	Prairie View A&M University	Prairie View	Texas	Active	
**Zeta Delta**	1970	University of Tennessee	Knoxville	Tennessee	Active	
**Zeta Epsilon**	1971	Ferris State University	Big Rapids	Michigan	Active	
**Zeta Zeta**	1971	Murray State University	Murray	Kentucky	Active	
**Zeta Eta**	1971	Paine College	Augusta	Georgia	Active	
**Zeta Theta**	1971	Southern University at New Orleans	New Orleans	Louisiana	Active	
Zeta Iota	1971–xxxx ?	Western Illinois University	Macomb	Illinois	Inactive	
**Zeta Kappa**	1971	University of Tennessee at Chattanooga	Chattanooga	Tennessee	Active	
**Zeta Lambda**	1971	University of Tennessee at Martin	Martin	Tennessee	Active	
**Zeta Mu**	1971	University of Texas at Arlington	Arlington	Texas	Active	
**Zeta Nu**	1971	Eastern Kentucky University	Richmond	Kentucky	Active	
**Zeta Xi**	1971	Bennett College	Greensboro	North Carolina	Active	
**Zeta Omicron**	1971	Florida State University	Tallahassee	Florida	Active	
**Zeta Pi**	1971	McNeese State University	Lake Charles	Louisiana	Active	
Zeta Rho	1971–xxxx ?	Central Michigan University	Mount Pleasant	Michigan	Inactive	
**Zeta Sigma**	1971	The College of New Jersey	Ewing Township	New Jersey	Active	
**Zeta Tau**	1971	Texas Tech University	Lubbock	Texas	Active	
**Zeta Upsilon**	1971	University of South Florida	Tampa	Florida	Active	
Zeta Phi	1971–xxxx ?	Indiana University Northwest	Gary	Indiana	Inactive	
**Zeta Chi**	1972	Jarvis Christian University	Wood County	Texas	Active	
**Zeta Psi**	1972	San Jose State University	San Jose	California	Active	(Note: Chapter originated as part of the mixed graduate and collegiate Eta Rho Omega chapter.)
**Alpha Nu (Fourth)**	1972	California State University, Fresno	Fresno	California	Active	(Note: This chapter formed when the citywide Alpha Nu (Third) split into Iota Omicron Omega chapter for graduates and moved to California State University.)
Eta Alpha	1972–xxxx ?	Illinois State University	Normal	Illinois	Inactive	
Eta Beta	1972–xxxx ?	Vanderbilt University	Nashville	Tennessee	Inactive	
Eta Gamma	1972–xxxx ?	Eastern Illinois University	Charleston	Illinois	Inactive	
**Eta Delta**	1972	University of Texas at El Paso	El Paso	Texas	Active	
**Eta Epsilon**	1972	Stephen F. Austin State University	Nacogdoches	Texas	Active	
**Eta Zeta**	1972	Marshall University	Huntington	West Virginia	Active	
**Eta Eta**	1972	University of New Orleans	New Orleans	Louisiana	Active	
**Eta Theta**	1972	Loyola University New Orleans	New Orleans	Louisiana	Active	
**Eta Iota**	1972	Columbus State University	Columbus	Georgia	Active	
**Eta Kappa**	1972	Louisiana State University	Baton Rouge	Louisiana	Active	
**Eta Lambda**	1972	California State University, Sacramento	Sacramento	California	Active	
**Eta Mu**	1972	Georgia State University	Atlanta	Georgia	Active	
Eta Nu	1973–xxxx ?	Voorhees College	Denmark	South Carolina	Inactive	
**Eta Xi**	1973	University of Georgia	Athens	Georgia	Active	
**Eta Omicron**	1973	West Virginia University	Morgantown	West Virginia	Active	
Eta Pi	1973–xxxx ?	University of Central Oklahoma	Edmond	Oklahoma	Inactive	
**Eta Rho**	1973	Morehead State University	Morehead	Kentucky	Active	
**Eta Sigma**	May 9, 1973	San Francisco State University	San Francisco	California	Active	
**Eta Sigma**	May 9, 1973	University of San Francisco	San Francisco	California	Active	
**Eta Tau**	1973	Drake University	Des Moines	Iowa	Active	(Note: Chapter formed from the dissolution of the mixed graduate and collegiate Beta Gamma (First) chapter.)
**Eta Tau**	1973	Iowa State University	Ames	Iowa	Active	(Note: Chapter formed from the dissolution of the mixed graduate and collegiate Beta Gamma (First) chapter.)
**Eta Upsilon**	1973	Arkansas State University	Jonesboro	Arkansas	Active	
**Eta Phi**	1973	Texas A&M University–Kingsville	Kingsville	Texas	Active	
**Eta Chi**	1973	Northwestern State University of Louisiana	Natchitoches	Louisiana	Active	
**Eta Psi**	1973	Middle Tennessee State University	Murfreesboro	Tennessee	Active	
**Theta Alpha**	1973	East Carolina University	Greenville	North Carolina	Active	
**Theta Beta**	1973	Oklahoma State University–Stillwater	Stillwater	Oklahoma	Active	
**Theta Gamma**	1973	University of South Carolina	Columbia	South Carolina	Active	
Theta Delta	1973–xxxx ?	Texas State University	San Marcos	Texas	Inactive	
**Theta Epsilon**	1973	Sam Houston State University	Huntsville	Texas	Active	
**Theta Zeta**	1973	University of Louisiana at Monroe	Monroe	Louisiana	Active	(Note: Chapter formed by absorbing Alphaette (local).)
**Theta Eta**	1973	Henderson State University	Arkadelphia	Arkansas	Active	
**Theta Theta**	1973	Paul Quinn College	Dallas	Texas	Active	
Theta Iota	1973–xxxx ?	West Chester University	West Chester	Pennsylvania	Inactive	
**Theta Kappa**	1974	University of Virginia	Charlottesville	Virginia	Active	
**Theta Lambda**	1974	Louisiana Tech University	Ruston	Louisiana	Active	
**Theta Mu**	February 24, 1974	University of Central Arkansas	Conway	Arkansas	Active	
**Theta Nu**	1974	University of Maryland, College Park	College Park	Maryland	Active	
**Theta Xi**	1974	University of Tulsa	Tulsa	Oklahoma	Active	
Theta Omicron	1974–xxxx ?	Eureka College	Eureka	Illinois	Inactive	
**Theta Pi**	1974	University of North Carolina at Chapel Hill	Chapel Hill	North Carolina	Active	
**Theta Rho**	1974	Virginia Commonwealth University	Richmond	Virginia	Active	
**Theta Sigma**	1974	University of Alabama	Tuscaloosa	Alabama	Active	
**Theta Tau**	1974	Detroit Citywide	Detroit	Michigan	Active	(Note: Chapter was chartered at the University of Detroit–Marygrove. It currently includes University of Detroit Mercy and Marygrove College/)
**Theta Upsilon**	1974	Rust College	Holly Springs	Mississippi	Active	
**Theta Phi**	1974	Virginia Tech	Blacksburg	Virginia	Active	
Theta Chi	1974–xxxx ?	Radford University	Radford	Virginia	Inactive	
**Theta Psi**	1974	University of Mississippi	Oxford	Mississippi	Active	
Iota Alpha	1974–xxxx ?	Brown University	Providence	Rhode Island	Inactive	
**Iota Beta**	1974	University of Southern California	Los Angeles	California	Active	
**Iota Gamma**	1974	Northeastern University	Boston	Massachusetts	Active	
**Iota Delta**	1974	University of Wisconsin–Milwaukee	Milwaukee	Wisconsin	Active	
Iota Epsilon	1974–1982	National College of Education	Chicago	Illinois	Inactive	
**Iota Zeta**	1974	Southern Arkansas University	Magnolia	Arkansas	Active	
**Beta Gamma (Second)**	1974	University of West Florida	Pensacola	Florida	Active	
Iota Eta	1975	Mercer University	Macon	Georgia	Active	
Iota Theta	1975–xxxx ?	Kettering University	Flint	Michigan	Inactive	
**Iota Iota**	1975	Bowling Green State University	Bowling Green	Ohio	Active	
**Iota Kappa**	April 12, 1975	University of Southern Mississippi	Hattiesburg	Mississippi	Active	
**Iota Lambda**	1975	University of Florida	Gainesville	Florida	Active	
**Iota Mu**	1975	Duke University	Durham	North Carolina	Active	
Iota Nu	1975–xxxx ?	University of Miami	Coral Gables	Florida	Inactive	
**Iota Xi**	1975	Francis Marion University	Florence	South Carolina	Active	
**Iota Omicron**	1975	College of Charleston	Charleston	South Carolina	Active	
Iota Pi	1975–xxxx ?	Baptist College			Inactive	(Note: This chapter was possibly at American Baptist College, a historically black private college in Nashville, Tennessee, that was the beneficiary of an endowment gift from AKA in 2019.)
**Iota Rho**	1975	Utica College	Utica	New York	Active	
**Iota Sigma**	1975	University of Kentucky	Lexington	Kentucky	Active	
**Iota Tau**	1975	University of Arizona	Tucson	Arizona	Active	
**Iota Upsilon**	1975	Syracuse University	Syracuse	New York	Active	
**Iota Phi**	May 16, 1975	University of Alabama at Birmingham	Birmingham	Alabama	Active	
Iota Chi	1975–xxxx ?	Millersville University of Pennsylvania	Millersville	Pennsylvania	Inactive	
Iota Psi	1975–xxxx ?	Rutgers University	New Brunswick	New Jersey	Inactive	
**Kappa Alpha**	1975	Western Carolina University	Cullowhee	North Carolina	Active	
**Kappa Beta**	1975	PennWest California	California	Pennsylvania	Active	
**Kappa Gamma**	1975	Old Dominion University	Norfolk	Virginia	Active	
Kappa Delta	1975–xxxx ?	LIU Post	Brookville	New York	Inactive	
**Kappa Epsilon**	1975	Adelphi University	Garden City	New York	Active	
Kappa Zeta	1976–xxxx ?	Clarion University	Clarion	Pennsylvania	Inactive	
**Kappa Eta**	1976	Georgia College & State University	Milledgeville	Georgia	Active	
**Kappa Theta**	1976	University of California, Riverside	Riverside	California	Active	
**Kappa Iota**	March 20, 1976	University of Arkansas	Fayetteville	Arkansas	Active	
**Kappa Kappa**	1976	University of North Carolina at Charlotte	Charlotte	North Carolina	Active	
**Kappa Lambda**	1976	Texas Christian University	Fort Worth	Texas	Active	
**Kappa Mu**	1976	Southern Methodist University	Dallas	Texas	Active	
**Kappa Nu**	1976	Texas Woman's University	Denton	Texas	Active	
**Kappa Xi**	1976	University of Nevada, Las Vegas	Paradise	Nevada	Active	
**Kappa Omicron**	1976	North Carolina State University	Raleigh	North Carolina	Active	
**Kappa Pi**	1976	Kansas State University	Manhattan	Kansas	Active	
**Kappa Rho**	1976	Austin Peay State University	Clarksville	Tennessee	Active	
**Kappa Sigma**	1976	Washington State University	Pullman	Washington	Active	
**Kappa Tau**	1976	University of West Georgia	Carrollton	Georgia	Active	
**Kappa Upsilon**	May 23, 1976	Valdosta State University	Valdosta	Georgia	Active	
Kappa Phi	May 29, 1976	Hofstra University	Nassau County	New York	Active	
**Kappa Chi**	1976	Auburn University	Auburn	Alabama	Active	
**Kappa Psi**	1976	University of Oklahoma	Norman	Oklahoma	Active	
**Lambda Alpha**	1976	California State University, Long Beach	Long Beach	California	Active	
**Lambda Beta**	1977	Towson University	Towson	Maryland	Active	
**Lambda Gamma**	1977	University of Delaware	Newark	Delaware	Active	
**Lambda Delta**	1977	Longwood University	Farmville	Virginia	Active	
Lambda Epsilon	1977–xxxx ?	Frostburg State University	Frostburg	Maryland	Inactive	
**Lambda Zeta**	1977	American University	Washington	District of Columbia	Active	
**Lambda Eta**	February 5, 1977	Mississippi State University	Starkville	Mississippi	Active	
**Lambda Theta**	1977	Clemson University	Clemson	South Carolina	Active	
**Lambda Iota**	1977	Millsaps College	Jackson	Mississippi	Active	
**Lambda Kappa**	1977	Georgia Southern University	Statesboro	Georgia	Active	
**Lambda Lambda**	1977	Lander University	Greenwood	South Carolina	Active	
**Lambda Mu**	1977	Miami University	Oxford	Ohio	Active	
Lambda Nu	1977–xxxx ?	California Polytechnic State University, San Luis Obispo	San Luis Obispo County	California	Inactive	
**Lambda Xi**	1977	University of Wisconsin–Whitewater	Whitewater	Wisconsin	Active	
**Lambda Omicron**	1977	Southeastern Louisiana University	Hammond	Louisiana	Active	
**Lambda Pi**	1977	Jacksonville State University	Jacksonville	Alabama	Active	
**Lambda Rho**	1977	Rowan University	Glassboro	New Jersey	Active	
**Lambda Sigma**	1977	University of California, Irvine	Irvine	California	Active	
Lambda Tau	1977–xxxx ?	Hartford Citywide	Hartford	Connecticut	Inactive	(Note: This citywide chapter included the Central Connecticut State University, Eastern Connecticut State University, Trinity College, Wesleyan University, the University of Connecticut, and the University of Hartford.)
**Lambda Upsilon**	1977	Cambridge, Massachusetts Citywide	Cambridge	Massachusetts	Active	(Note: Chapter includes the Massachusetts Institute of Technology, Harvard University, and Wellesley College.)
**Lambda Phi**	1977	University of Maryland, Baltimore County	Baltimore County	Maryland	Active	
**Lambda Chi**	1978	James Madison University	Harrisonburg	Virginia	Active	
**Lambda Psi**	1978	Lewis University	Romeoville	Illinois	Active	
**Mu Alpha**	1978	Troy University	Troy	Alabama	Active	
**Mu Beta**	1978	Marquette University	Milwaukee	Wisconsin	Active	
**Mu Gamma**	1978	Delta State University	Cleveland	Mississippi	Active	
**Mu Delta**	1978	George Washington University	Washington	District of Columbia	Active	
**Mu Epsilon**	1978	Christian Brothers University	Memphis	Tennessee	Active	
**Mu Zeta**	1978–xxxx ?	Augusta State University	Augusta	Georgia	Inactive	
**Mu Eta**	May 1978	University of West Alabama	Livingston	Alabama	Active	
**Mu Theta**	1978	University of North Florida	Jacksonville	Florida	Active	
**Mu Iota**	1978	San Diego Citywide	San Diego	California	Active	(Note: Chapter includes San Diego State University, the University of San Diego, and University of California, San Diego.)
**Mu Kappa**	1978	University of California, Davis	Davis	California	Active	
**Mu Lambda**	1978	University of South Carolina Aiken	Aiken	South Carolina	Active	
Mu Mu	July 8, 1978 – xxxx ?	University of Montevallo	Montevallo	Alabama	Inactive	
Mu Nu	1978–xxxx ?	University of the Pacific	Stockton	California	Inactive	
**Mu Xi**	1978	Winthrop University	Rock Hill	South Carolina	Active	
**Mu Omicron**	1978	Slippery Rock University	Slippery Rock	Pennsylvania	Active	
**Mu Pi**	1978	Spelman College	Atlanta	Georgia	Active	
**Mu Rho**	1979	University of Minnesota	Minneapolis	Minnesota	Active	
Mu Sigma	1979–xxxx ?	Emporia State University	Emporia	Kansas	Inactive	
Mu Tau	1979–xxxx ?	Truman State University	Kirksvillei	Missouri	Inactive	
**Mu Upsilon**	1979	Cornell University	Ithaca	New York	Active	
**Mu Phi**	1979	Saginaw Valley State University	University Center	Michigan	Active	
**Mu Chi**	1979	Salisbury University	Salisbury	Michigan	Active	
Mu Psi	1979–xxxx ?	Texas Wesleyan College	Fort Worth	Texas	Inactive	
**Nu Alpha**	1979	Emory University	Atlanta	Georgia	Active	
**Nu Beta**	1979	Georgia Tech	Atlanta	Georgia	Active	
**Nu Gamma**	1979	Morris College	Sumter	South Carolina	Active	
**Nu Delta**	December 1, 1979	Birmingham–Southern College	Birmingham	Alabama	Active	
Nu Epsilon	1980–xxxx ?	Christopher Newport University	Newport News	Virginia	Inactive	
**Nu Zeta**	1980	Georgia Southwestern State University	Americus	Georgia	Active	
**Nu Eta**	1980	Rider University	Lawrence Township	New Jersey	Active	
**Nu Theta**	1980	Grand Valley State University	Allendale	Michigan	Active	
**Nu Iota**	1980	Edward Waters University	Jacksonville	Florida	Active	
**Nu Kappa**	1980	Fairleigh Dickinson University	Teaneck	New Jersey	Active	
**Nu Lambda**	1980	Indiana University Northwest	Gary	Indiana	Active	
**Nu Mu**	1980	St. John's University	New York City	New York	Active	
**Nu Nu**	1980	University of California, Santa Barbara	Santa Barbara	California	Active	
**Nu Xi**	1980	Auburn University at Montgomery	Montgomery	Alabama	Active	
**Nu Omicron**	1980	University of North Alabama	Florence	Alabama	Active	
**Nu Pi**	1980	West Virginia University Institute of Technology	Beckley	West Virginia	Active	
**Nu Rho**	1980	University of North Carolina at Greensboro	Greensboro	North Carolina	Active	
Nu Sigma	1981–xxxx ?	Southeast Missouri State University	Cape Girardeau	Missouri	Inactive	
Nu Tau	1981–xxxx ?	Georgia College & State University	Milledgeville	Georgia	Inactive	
Nu Upsilon	1981–xxxx ?	Capital University	Bexley	Ohio	Inactive	
Nu Phi	1981	Oakland University	Oakland County	Michigan	Active	
Nu Chi	1981	College of William & Mary	Williamsburg	Virginia	Active	
**Nu Psi**	1981–xxxx ?	State University of New York at Old Westbury	Old Westbury	New York	Inactive	
**Xi Alpha**	1981	Tennessee Tech	Cookeville	Tennessee	Active	
**Xi Beta**	1981	Stanford University	Stanford	California	Active	
Xi Gamma	1981–xxxx ?	Boston College	Chestnut Hill	Massachusetts	Inactive	
Xi Delta	1981–xxxx ?	Missouri University of Science and Technology	Rolla	Missouri	Inactive	
Xi Epsilon	1981–xxxx ?	Kendall College	Chicago	Illinois	Inactive	
Xi Zeta	1982–xxxx ?	Illinois Wesleyan University	Bloomington	Illinois	Inactive	
**Xi Eta**	1982	Colorado State University	Fort Collins	Colorado	Active	
Xi Theta	1982–xxxx ?	State University of New York Brockport	Brockport	New York	Inactive	
**Xi Iota**	1982	Cameron University	Lawton	Oklahoma	Active	
**Xi Kappa**	1982	Chicago State University	Chicago	Illinois	Active	
**Xi Lambda**	1983	Dartmouth College	Hanover	New Hampshire	Active	
**Xi Mu**	1983	State University of New York at New Paltz	New Paltz	New York	Active	
**Xi Nu**	1983	Springfield, Massachusetts Citywide	Springfield	Massachusetts	Active	
**Xi Xi**	1983	Lehman College	New York City	New York	Active	
**Xi Omicron**	1984	Hartford Connecticut Citywide	Hartford	Connecticut	Active	(Note: Chapter includes Albertus Magnus College, Quinnipiac University, Southern Connecticut State University, the University of New Haven, and Yale University.)
Xi Pi	1984–xxxx ?	California State University, East Bay	Hayward	California	Inactive	
Xi Rho	1984–xxxx ?	Binghamton University	Binghamton	New York	Inactive	
Xi Sigma	1984–xxxx ?	Buffalo State University	Buffalo	New York	Inactive	
**Xi Tau**	1984	Johns Hopkins University	Baltimore	Maryland	Active	
Xi Upsilon	1984–xxxx ?	California State University, Dominguez Hills	Carson	California	Inactive	
**Xi Phi**	1984	University of Michigan–Dearborn	Dearborn	Michigan	Active	
**Xi Chi**	1985	Flint, Michigan Citywide	Flint	Michigan	Active	
**Xi Psi**	1985	Texas A&M University	College Station	Texas	Active	
**Omicron Alpha**	1985	Aurora University	Aurora	Illinois	Active	
**Omicron Beta**	1986	Rochester, New York Citywide	Rochester	New York	Active	(Note: Chapter includes Nazareth University, the University of Rochester, and Rochester Institute of Technology.)
**Omicron Gamma**	1986	University of Houston–Downtown	Houston	Texas	Active	
**Omicron Delta**	1987	Jacksonville University	Jacksonville	Florida	Active	
**Omicron Epsilon**	May 9, 1987	Elon University	Elon	North Carolina	Active	
**Omicron Zeta**	1987	University of Alabama in Huntsville	Huntsville	Alabama	Active	
**Omicron Eta**	1987	Westchester County, New York	Westchester County	New York	Active	
**Omicron Theta**	1987	Marymount Manhattan College	Manhattan, New York City	New York	Active	
**Omicron Iota**	1987	George Mason University	Fairfax	Virginia	Active	
**Omicron Kappa**	1987	Appalachian State University	Boone	North Carolina	Active	
**Omicron Lambda**	1988	University of North Carolina at Pembroke	Pembroke	North Carolina	Active	
**Omicron Mu**	May 14, 1988	Samford University	Homewood	Alabama	Active	
Omicron Nu (First)	198x ? – 198x ?	Princeton University	Princeton	New Jersey	Inactive	
Omicron Nu	1988–2014	Lambuth University	Jackson	Tennessee	Inactive	
**Omicron Xi**	1988	Milwaukee Citywide	Milwaukee	Wisconsin	Active	(Note: Chapter includes the University of Wisconsin-Milwaukee, Marquette University, and the University of Wisconsin-Whitewater.)
Omicron Omicron					Inactive ?	
**Omicron Pi**	1988	Georgetown University	Washington	District of Columbia	Active	
**Omicron Rho**	April 1989	East Tennessee State University	Johnson City	Tennessee	Active	
**Omicron Sigma**	1989	University of Lynchburg	Lynchburg	Virginia	Active	
**Omicron Tau**	1989	University of Texas at San Antonio	San Antonio	Texas	Active	
Omicron Upsilon	1989–xxxx ?	State University of New York at Stony Brook	Stony Brook	New York	Inactive	
**Omicron Phi**	1989	University of North Carolina Wilmington	Wilmington	North Carolina	Active	
**Omicron Chi**	1989	Rhodes College	Memphis	Tennessee	Active	
**Omicron Psi**	1990	Tulane University	New Orleans	Louisiana	Active	
Pi Alpha	1990–xxxx ?	Nicholls State University	Thibodaux	Louisiana	Inactive	
**Pi Beta**	1990	Wake Forest University	Winston-Salem	North Carolina	Active	
**Pi Gamma**	1990	Columbus Citywide	Columbus	Ohio	Active	(Note: Chapter includes Capital University, Denison University, Ohio Dominican University, Ohio Wesleyan University, and Otterbein University.)
Pi Delta	1990–xxxx ?	Lawrence Technological University	Southfield	Michigan	Inactive	
**Pi Epsilon**	1990	Rutgers University–Camden	Camden	New Jersey	Active	
**Pi Zeta**	1990	Mississippi University for Women	Columbus	Mississippi	Active	
Pi Eta	1990–xxxx ?	Missouri State University	Springfield	Missouri	Inactive	
**Pi Theta**	1990	Johnson & Wales University	Providence	Rhode Island	Active	
**Pi Iota**	1990	William Paterson University	Wayne	New Jersey	Active	
**Pi Kappa**	June 19, 1990	University at Albany, SUNY	Albany	New York	Active	
**Pi Lambda**	1991	DePauw University	Greencastle	Indiana	Active	
**Pi Mu**	1991	Baylor University	Waco	Texas	Active	
**Pi Nu**	1992	Northeastern Illinois University	Chicago	Illinois	Active	
**Pi Xi**	1992	University of Central Missouri	Warrensburg	Missouri	Active	
**Pi Omicron**	1992	Ashland University	Cleveland Heights	Ohio	Active	
**Pi Omicron**	1992	Oberlin College	Oberlin	Ohio	Active	
**Pi Pi**	1992	Erie Citywide	Erie	Pennsylvania	Active	
**Pi Rho**	1992	Spring Hill College	Mobile	Alabama	Active	
**Pi Sigma**	1992	Portland Citywide	Portland	Oregon	Active	(Note: Chapter includes Portland State University, Warner Pacific University, and Lewis & Clark College.)
Pi Tau					Inactive ?	
Pi Upsilon	1992–xxxx ?	University of California, Santa Cruz	Santa Cruz	California	Inactive	
**Pi Phi**	1992	Kennesaw State University	Cobb County	Georgia	Active	
**Pi Chi**	1992	Stockton University	Galloway Township	New Jersey	Active	
Pi Psi	1992–xxxx ?	University of Central Florida	Orlando	Florida	Inactive	
**Rho Alpha**	1992	University of Missouri–Kansas City	Kansas City	Missouri	Active	
Rho Beta					Inactive ?	
**Rho Gamma**	1993	Ramapo College	Mahwah	New Jersey	Active	
**Rho Delta**	1994	California State University, San Bernardino	San Bernardino	California	Active	
Rho Epsilon	1994–xxxx ?	California State University, Northridge	Los Angeles	California	Inactive	
**Rho Zeta**	1994	Furman University	Greenville	South Carolina	Active	
**Rho Eta**	1994	Brenau University	Gainesville	Georgia	Active	
**Rho Theta**	1994	Pace University	New York City	New York	Active	
**Rho Iota**	1992	Missouri Western State University	St. Joseph Missouri	Missouri	Active	
**Rho Kappa**	1995	University of Massachusetts Amherst	Amherst	Massachusetts	Active	
Rho Lambda					Inactive ?	
**Rho Mu**	1995	University of Richmond	Richmond	Virginia	Active	
**Rho Nu**	1996	Midwestern State University	Wichita Falls	Texas	Active	
**Rho Xi**	1996	University of the Virgin Islands	Saint Croix	United States Virgin Islands	Active	
**Rho Omicron**	1996	University of the Virgin Islands	Saint Thomas	United States Virgin Islands	Active	
**Rho Pi**	1996	Coastal Carolina University	Conway	South Carolina	Active	
**Rho Rho**	1997	Indiana University of Pennsylvania	Indiana County	Pennsylvania	Active	
Rho Sigma					Inactive ?	
**Rho Tau**	1998	University of South Carolina Upstate	Valley Falls	South Carolina	Active	
**Rho Upsilon**	1998	Kean University	South Orange	New Jersey	Active	
**Rho Upsilon**	1998	Seton Hall University	South Orange	New Jersey	Active	
**Rho Phi**	1998	Montclair State University	Montclair	New Jersey	Active	
**Rho Chi**	1999	Huntingdon College	Montgomery	Alabama	Active	
**Rho Psi**	1999	Xavier University	Cincinnati	Ohio	Active	
**Sigma Alpha**	April 2, 2000	Arlington, Virginia Citywide	Arlington	Virginia	Active	
**Sigma Beta**	2000	Texas A&M University–Corpus Christi	Corpus Christi	Texas	Active	
**Sigma Gamma**	2000	Lake Forest College	Lake Forest	Illinois	Active	
**Sigma Delta**	2000	University of Oregon	Eugene	Oregon	Active	
**Sigma Delta**	2000	Oregon State University	Corvallis	Oregon	Active	
**Sigma Epsilon**	2000	Texas State University	San Marcos	Texas	Active	
**Sigma Zeta**	2001	Albion College	Albion	Michigan	Active	(Note: Chapter formed from Precious Ebony (local), established in 1999.)
Sigma Eta	1996–xxxx ?	Northern Kentucky University	Highland Heights	Kentucky	Inactive	
**Sigma Theta**	2001	Houston Christian University	Houston	Texas	Active	
**Sigma Iota**	2001	Florida Atlantic University	Boca Raton	Florida	Active	
**Sigma Kappa**	2001	University of Texas at Dallas	Richardson	Texas	Active	
Sigma Lambda	2002–xxxx ?	Philadelphia Area	Philadelphia	Pennsylvania	Inactive	
**Sigma Mu**	April 18, 2002	High Point University	High Point	North Carolina	Active	
**Sigma Nu**	2003	University of Tampa	Tampa	Florida	Active	
**Sigma Xi**	2003	Charleston Southern University	North Charleston	South Carolina	Active	
**Sigma Omicron**	2004	Virginia Wesleyan University	Virginia Beach	Virginia	Active	
**Sigma Pi**	2004	Florida International University	Miami	Florida	Active	
**Sigma Rho**	2004	California State University, Fullerton	Fullerton	California	Active	
**Sigma Rho**	2004	California State Polytechnic University, Pomona	Pomona	California	Active	
**Sigma Rho**	2004	University of La Verne	La Verne	California	Active	
**Sigma Sigma**	2005	Clayton State University	Morrow	Georgia	Active	
**Sigma Tau**	April 24, 2005	Georgia Southern University–Armstrong Campus	Savannah	Georgia	Active	
**Sigma Upsilon**	2006	Florida Gulf Coast University	Fort Myers	Florida	Active	
**Sigma Phi**	2006	Mercer University Atlanta Campus	Atlanta	Georgia	Active	
**Sigma Chi**	2008	Nova Southeastern University	Fort Lauderdale	Florida	Active	
**Sigma Psi**	2008	Davidson College	Davidson	North Carolina	Active	
**Tau Alpha**	2009	Widener University	Chester	Pennsylvania	Active	
**Tau Beta**	2009	Queens University of Charlotte	Charlotte	North Carolina	Active	
**Tau Gamma**	2009	North Carolina Wesleyan University	Rocky Mount	North Carolina	Active	
**Tau Delta**	2009	Randolph–Macon College	Ashland	Virginia	Active	
**Tau Epsilon**	December 5, 2010	Louisiana State University Shreveport	Shreveport	Louisiana	Active	
**Tau Zeta**	2011	Washington and Lee University	Lexington	Virginia	Active	
**Beta Iota (Fourth)**	2010	University of Bridgeport	Bridgeport	Connecticut	Active	
**Tau Eta**	2011	Monmouth University	West Long Branch	New Jersey	Active	
**Tau Theta**	2011	Stevenson University	Baltimore County	Maryland	Active	
**Tau Iota**	2011	Millikin University	Decatur	Illinois	Active	
**Tau Kappa**	2011	Loyola Marymount University	Los Angeles	California	Active	
**Tau Lambda**	2011	Pepperdine University	Malibu	California	Active	
**Tau Mu**	2012	DePaul University	Chicago	Illinois	Active	
**Tau Nu**	2012	University of the Bahamas	Nassau	The Bahamas	Active	
**Tau Xi**	2012	Villanova University	Villanova	Pennsylvania	Active	
Tau Omicron	2012–June 2021	Wesley College	Dover	Delaware	Inactive	(Note: Chapter closed when Delaware State University acquired Wesley College in June 2021)
**Tau Pi**	2012	Oglethorpe University	Brookhaven	Georgia	Active	
**Tau Rho**	2013	University of Southern Indiana	Evansville	Indiana	Active	
**Tau Sigma**	2013	New Jersey City University	Jersey City	New Jersey	Active	
**Tau Tau**	November 17, 2013	Colorado State University Pueblo	Pueblo	Colorado	Active	
**Tau Upsilon**	2013	Chowan University	Murfreesboro	North Carolina	Active	
**Tau Phi**	2014	University of New Mexico	Albuquerque	New Mexico	Active	
**Tau Chi**	2014	University of Illinois Springfield	Springfield	Illinois	Active	
**Tau Psi**	2014	Methodist University	Fayetteville	North Carolina	Active	
**Upsilon Alpha**	2015	Southwestern University	Georgetown	Texas	Active	
**Upsilon Beta**	2016	University of North Carolina at Charlotte	Charlotte	North Carolina	Active	
**Upsilon Gamma**	2016	McDaniel College	Westminster	Maryland	Active	
**Upsilon Delta**	November 13, 2016	University of South Carolina Beaufort	Beaufort	South Carolina	Active	
**Upsilon Epsilon**	April 16, 2017	California State University, Monterey Bay	Monterey County	California	Active	
**Upsilon Zeta**	2018	Columbia College	Columbia	South Carolina	Active	
**Upsilon Eta**	2018	Belmont University	Nashville	Tennessee	Active	
**Upsilon Theta**	2018	Fairleigh Dickinson University, Florham Campus	Florham Park	New Jersey	Active	
**Upsilon Iota**	2018	Bridgewater State University	Bridgewater	Massachusetts	Active	
**Upsilon Kappa**	2019	University of North Texas at Dallas	Dallas	Texas	Active	
**Upsilon Lambda**	November 21, 2021	Buffalo State University	Buffalo	New York	Active	
**Upsilon Mu**	April 10, 2022	University of Connecticut	Storrs	Connecticut	Active	
**Upsilon Nu**	April 24, 2022	Newberry College	Newberry	South Carolina	Active	
**Upsilon Xi**	October 29, 2023	Georgia Gwinnett College	Lawrenceville	Georgia	Active	
**Upsilon Rho**	November 19, 2023	Governors State University	University Park	Illinois	Active	

=== Notes ===
aq. Chapter was reactivated in November 2025.

== Graduate chapters ==
Following is a list of Alpha Kappa Alpha graduate chapters. Active chapters are indicated in bold; inactive chapters are indicated in italics.

Chapter	Chartered/Range	City/County	State/Country	Status	Ref.
Eta (First) (see **Alpha Omega**)	December 1, 1917 – 1922	Cleveland	Ohio	Reissued	(Note: Chapter started as the Women's College Club and was briefly chartered as the Eta chapter of Alpha Kappa Alpha in December 1917. Its name was changed in 1922 when the national fraternity decided graduate chapters would have Omega as the last letter of their names. The name Eta was reissued to a collegiate chapter.)
**Alpha Omega**	December 1, 1917	Cleveland	Ohio	Active	
Lambda (First) (see **Beta Omega**)	October 20, 1920 – 1922	Kansas City	Missouri	Reissued	(Note: Chapter was formed as the Lambda chapter (graduate) but was changed to Beta Omega in 1922 when the national fraternity decided graduate chapters would have Omega as the last letter of their names. The name Lambda was reissued to a collegiate chapter.)
**Beta Omega**	October 20, 1920	Kansas City	Missouri	Active	
Mu (First) (see **Gamma Omega**)	December 2, 1920 – 1922	St. Louis	Missouri	Reissued	(Note: Chapter was formed as the Mu chapter (graduate) but was changed to Gamma Omega in 1922 when the national fraternity decided graduate chapters would have Omega as the last letter of their names. The name Mu was reissued to a collegiate chapter.)
**Gamma Omega**	December 2, 1920	St. Louis	Missouri	Active	
Nu (First) (see **Delta Omega**)	February 26, 1921 – 1922	Petersburg	Virginia	Reissued	(Note: Chapter was formed as the Nu chapter (graduate) but was changed to Delta Omega in 1922 when the national fraternity decided graduate chapters would have Omega as the last letter of their names. The name Nu was reissued to a collegiate chapter.)
**Delta Omega**	February 26, 1921	Petersburg	Virginia	Active	
Sigma (First) (see **Epsilon Omega**)	December 2, 1921 – 1922	Baltimore	Maryland	Reissued	(Note: Chapter was formed as the Sigma chapter (graduate) but was changed to Epsilon Omega in 1922 when the national fraternity decided graduate chapters would have Omega as the last letter of their names. The name Sigma was reissued to a collegiate chapter.)
**Epsilon Omega**	December 2, 1921	Baltimore	Maryland	Active	
**Zeta Omega**	1922	Wilmington	Delaware	Active	
**Eta Omega**	1922	Louisville	Kentucky	Active	
**Theta Omega**	November 5, 1922	South Side Chicago	Illinois	Active	
**Iota Omega**	December 1, 1922	Norfolk	Virginia	Active	
**Kappa Omega**	March 1, 1923	Atlanta	Georgia	Active	
**Lambda Omega**	January 13, 1934	Newport News	Virginia	Active	
**Mu Omega**	May 10, 1924	Kansas City	Kansas	Active	
**Nu Omega**	1933	Marshall	Texas	Active	
**Xi Omega**	December 23, 1923	Washington	DC	Active	
**Omicron Omega**	October 24, 1924	Birmingham	Alabama	Active	
**Pi Omega**	June 25, 1925	Chattanooga	Tennessee	Active	
**Rho Omega**	December 17, 1924	Wilberforce	Ohio	Active	
**Sigma Omega**	December 18, 1924	Cincinnati	Ohio	Active	
**Tau Omega**	May 1925	Harlem	New York	Active	
**Upsilon Omega**	October 24, 1925	Richmond	Virginia	Active	
**Phi Omega**	February 14, 1924	Winston-Salem	North Carolina	Active	
**Chi Omega**	December 19, 1925	Rocky Mount	North Carolina	Active	
**Psi Omega**	1926	Roxbury	Massachusetts	Active	
**Omega Omega**	December 10, 1926	Philadelphia	Pennsylvania	Active	
**Alpha Alpha Omega**	1927	Pittsburgh	Pennsylvania	Active	
**Alpha Beta Omega**	July 23, 1927	New Orleans	Louisiana	Active	
**Alpha Gamma Omega**	October 1, 1927	Los Angeles	California	Active	
**Alpha Delta Omega**	October 9, 1927	Nashville	Tennessee	Active	(Note: Chapter formed from the Pi chapter, which originally included both collegiate and graduate members.)
**Alpha Epsilon Omega**	1928	Muskogee	Oklahoma	Active	
**Alpha Zeta Omega**	April 14, 1928	Durham	North Carolina	Active	
**Alpha Eta Omega**		Terre Haute	Indiana	Active	
**Alpha Theta Omega**	June 15, 1928	Raleigh	North Carolina	Active	
**Alpha Iota Omega**	September 1928	Topeka	Kansas	Active	
**Alpha Kappa Omega**	1928	Houston	Texas	Active	
**Alpha Lambda Omega**	1929	Charlotte	North Carolina	Active	
**Alpha Mu Omega**	February 16, 1929	Indianapolis	Indiana	Active	
**Alpha Nu Omega**	June 8, 1929	Oakland	California	Active	
**Alpha Xi Omega**	June 6, 1929	Dallas	Texas	Active	
**Alpha Omicron Omega**	November 7, 1929	Institute	West Virginia	Active	
**Alpha Pi Omega**	November 23, 1929	Knoxville	Tennessee	Active	
**Alpha Rho Omega**	1930	Detroit	Michigan	Active	(Note: Formed from the Xi chapter, a citywide chapter that originally included both collegiate and graduate members.)
**Alpha Sigma Omega**	October 6, 1930	Columbus	Ohio	Active	
**Alpha Tau Omega**	1930	San Antonio	Texas	Active	
**Alpha Upsilon Omega**		Oklahoma City	Oklahoma	Active	
**Alpha Phi Omega**	May 31, 1931	Danville	Virginia	Active	
**Alpha Chi Omega**	December 12, 1931	Tulsa	Oklahoma	Active	
**Alpha Psi Omega**	June 2, 1932	Wilmington	North Carolina	Active	
**Alpha Omega Omega**	June 3, 1933	Beaumont	Texas	Active	
**Beta Alpha Omega**	1934	Newark	New Jersey	Active	
**Beta Beta Omega**	April 21, 1934	Charleston	West Virginia	Active	
**Beta Gamma Omega**	1934	Lexington	Kentucky	Active	
**Beta Delta Omega**	May 28, 1934	Jackson	Mississippi	Active	
**Beta Epsilon Omega**	March 24, 1934	Memphis	Tennessee	Active	
**Beta Zeta Omega**	1934	Orangeburg	South Carolina	Active	
**Beta Eta Omega**	June 8, 1934	Dayton	Ohio	Active	
**Beta Iota Omega**	February 12, 1934	Greensboro	North Carolina	Active	
**Beta Kappa Omega**	April 1, 1935	Wichita	Kansas	Active	
**Beta Lambda Omega**		Bluefield	West Virginia	Active	
**Beta Mu Omega**	May 2, 1936	Fort Worth	Texas	Active	
**Beta Nu Omega**	June 13, 1936	Montgomery	Alabama	Active	
**Beta Xi Omega**	June 13, 1936	Tuskegee Institute	Alabama	Active	
**Beta Omicron Omega**		Okmulgee	Oklahoma	Active	
**Beta Pi Omega**	March 13, 1937	Little Rock	Arkansas	Active	
**Beta Rho Omega**		Hopkinsville	Kentucky	Active	
**Beta Sigma Omega**	December 19, 1937	Oklahoma City	Oklahoma	Active	
**Beta Tau Omega**	1938	Huntington	West Virginia	Active	
**Beta Upsilon Omega**	March 6, 1938	Frankfort	Kentucky	Active	
**Beta Phi Omega**	March 19, 1938	Galveston	Texas	Active	
**Beta Chi Omega**	December 3, 1938	Roanoke	Virginia	Active	
**Beta Psi Omega**	May 7, 1938	Austin	Texas	Active	
**Beta Omega Omega**	February 18, 1939	Paducah	Kentucky	Active	
**Gamma Alpha Omega**	March 4, 1939	Jackson	Tennessee	Active	
**Gamma Beta Omega**	February 18, 1940	Wislon	North Carolina	Active	
**Gamma Gamma Omega**	March 31, 1940	Asheville	North Carolina	Active	
**Gamma Delta Omega**	October 6, 1939	Portsmouth	Virginia	Active	
**Gamma Epsilon Omega**		Jefferson City	Missouri	Active	
**Gamma Zeta Omega**	April 27, 1940	Miami	Florida	Active	
**Gamma Eta Omega**	May 28, 1940	Baton Rouge	Louisiana	Active	
**Gamma Theta Omega**	December 7, 1940	Tampa	Florida	Active	
**Gamma Iota Omega**	February 1941	Lynchburg	Virginia	Active	
**Gamma Kappa Omega**	March 15, 1941	Carbondale	Illinois	Active	
**Gamma Lambda Omega**	1951	Lawrenceville	Virginia	Active	
**Gamma Mu Omega**	December 13, 1941	Daytona Beach	Florida	Active	
**Gamma Nu Omega**	February 7, 1942	Columbia	South Carolina	Active	
**Gamma Xi Omega**	February 14, 1942	Charleston	South Carolina	Active	
**Gamma Omicron Omega**	1942	Tyler	Texas	Active	
**Gamma Pi Omega**	March 1942	Fort Valley	Georgia	Active	
**Gamma Rho Omega**	June 23, 1942	Jacksonville	Florida	Active	
**Gamma Sigma Omega**	May 29, 1943	Savannah	Georgia	Active	
**Gamma Tau Omega**	March 22, 1943	Columbus	Georgia	Active	
**Gamma Upsilon Omega**	March 25, 1944	Hampton	Virginia	Active	
**Gamma Phi Omega**	June 25, 1944	Buffalo	New York	Active	
**Gamma Chi Omega**	October 14, 1944	Morgantown	West Virginia	Active	
**Gamma Psi Omega**	October 28, 1944	Gary	Indiana	Active	
**Gamma Omega Omega**	November 1, 1970	La Marque	Texas	Active	
**Delta Alpha Omega**	April 15, 1946	Waco	Texas	Active	
**Delta Beta Omega**	1946	Phoenix	Arizona	Active	
**Delta Gamma Omega**	May 7, 1946	Corpus Christi	Texas	Active	
**Delta Delta Omega**	May 25, 1946	East St. Louis	Illinois	Active	
**Delta Epsilon Omega**	1946	Omaha	Nebraska	Active	
**Delta Zeta Omega**	September 3, 1946	San Francisco	California	Active	
**Delta Eta Omega**	November 2, 1946	Albany	Georgia	Active	
**Delta Theta Omega**	November 22, 1946	Mobile	Alabama	Active	
**Delta Iota Omega**	November 23, 1946	Pensacola	Florida	Active	
**Delta Kappa Omega**	January 24, 1947	Tallahassee	Florida	Active	
**Delta Lambda Omega**	February 3, 1947	Shreveport	Louisiana	Active	
**Delta Mu Omega**	February 17, 1947 – xxxx ?; January 29, 1966	Albany	New York	Active	
**Delta Nu Omega**	April 15, 1946	Rochester	New York	Active	
**Delta Xi Omega**	April 19, 1947	Salisbury	North Carolina	Active	
**Delta Omicron Omega**	October 24, 1947	Orlando	Florida	Active	
**Delta Pi Omega**	October 25, 1947	Annapolis	Maryland	Active	
**Delta Rho Omega**	November 15, 1947	Brooklyn	New York	Active	
**Delta Sigma Omega**	December 20, 1947	Salibury	Maryland	Active	
**Delta Tau Omega**	December 17, 1947	Lansing	Michigan	Active	
**Delta Upsilon Omega**	1948	Seattle	Washington	Active	
**Delta Phi Omega**	April 17, 1948	Minneapolis	Minnesota	Active	
**Delta Chi Omega**	June 25, 1948	Evanston	Illinois	Active	
**Delta Psi Omega**	December 4, 1948	Ann Arbor	Michigan	Active	
**Delta Omega Omega**	December 11, 1948	Pine Bluff	Arkansas	Active	
Epsilon Alpha Omega		Greenville	South Carolina	Inactive ?	
**Epsilon Beta Omega**	March 5, 1949	Spartanburg	South Carolina	Active	
**Epsilon Gamma Omega**	March 19, 1949	Huntsville	Alabama	Active	
**Epsilon Delta Omega**	1949	Beckley	West Virginia	Active	
**Epsilon Epsilon Omega**	April 9, 1949	Champaign	Illinois	Active	(Note: Chapter formed as a break-away from the mixed collegiate and graduate Gamma chapter.)
**Epsilon Zeta Omega**	April 3, 1949	Longview	Texas	Active	
**Epsilon Eta Omega**	1970	Pomona	California	Active	
**Epsilon Theta Omega**	April 2, 1949 – 19xx ?; November 26, 2011	Port Arthur	Texas	Active	
**Epsilon Iota Omega**	May 6, 1940	Dover	Delaware	Active	
**Epsilon Kappa Omega**	May 11, 1949	Milwaukee	Wisconsin	Active	
**Epsilon Lambda Omega**		Cairo	Illinois	Active	
**Epsilon Mu Omega**	May 21, 1949	Youngstown	Ohio	Active	
**Epsilon Nu Omega**	October 22, 1949	Denver	Colorado	Active	
**Epsilon Xi Omega**	October 29, 1949	San Diego	California	Active	(Note: Chapter formed from Beta Kappa when the sorority did away with mixed graduate and collegiate chapters.)
**Epsilon Omicron Omega**	May 6, 1950	Hartford	Connecticut	Active	
**Epsilon Pi Omega**	May 13, 1950	St. Albans, Queens	New York	Active	
Epsilon Rho Omega				Inactive ?	
**Epsilon Sigma Omega**	February 2, 1952	Harrisburg	Pennsylvania	Active	
**Epsilon Tau Omega**	April 19, 1952	Greenville	South Carolina	Active	
**Epsilon Upsilon Omega**	March 8, 1952	Trenton	New Jersey	Active	
**Epsilon Phi Omega**	March 15, 1952	Goldsboro	North Carolina	Active	
**Epsilon Chi Omega**	March 8, 1952	Florence	South Carolina	Active	
**Epsilon Psi Omega**	March 15, 1952	Grambling	Louisiana	Active	
**Epsilon Omega Omega**	May 3, 1952	Macon	Georgia	Active	
**Zeta Alpha Omega**	April 25, 1952	Toledo	Ohio	Active	
**Zeta Beta Omega**		Flint	Michigan	Active	
**Zeta Gamma Omega**	March 28, 1953	Prairie View	Texas	Active	
**Zeta Delta Omega**	April 25, 1953	Natchez	Mississippi	Active	
**Zeta Epsilon Omega**	February 14, 1954	Suffolk	Virginia	Active	
**Zeta Zeta Omega**	March 13, 1954	Evansville	Indiana	Active	
**Zeta Eta Omega**	March 27, 1954	Selma	Alabama	Active	
**Zeta Theta Omega**	April 3, 1954	Akron	Ohio	Active	(Note: Chapter formed from Beta Beta chapter when its graduate members broke away from this mixed chapter.)
**Zeta Iota Omega**	May 1, 1954	Brunswick	Georgia	Active	
**Zeta Kappa Omega**		Elizabeth City	North Carolina	Active	
**Zeta Lambda Omega**		Alexandria	Louisiana	Active	
**Zeta Mu Omega**	February 26, 1955	Gastonia	North Carolina	Active	
**Zeta Nu Omega**	March 12, 1955	New Rochelle	New York	Active	
**Zeta Xi Omega**	March 13, 1955	Augusta	Georgia	Active	
**Zeta Omicron Omega**	March 19, 1955	Kinston	North Carolina	Active	
**Zeta Pi Omega**	April 2, 1955	Fayetteville	North Carolina	Active	
**Zeta Rho Omega**	April 16, 1955	Fort Lauderdale	Florida	Active	
**Zeta Sigma Omega**	November 25, 1955	Portland	Oregon	Active	
**Zeta Tau Omega**	December 10, 1955	West Palm Beach	Florida	Active	
**Zeta Upsilon Omega**	December 15, 1955	St. Petersburg	Florida	Active	
**Zeta Phi Omega**	January 7, 1956	Monroe	Louisiana	Active	
**Zeta Chi Omega**	May 25, 1956	Alexandria	Virginia	Active	
**Zeta Psi Omega**	February 9, 1957	Lake Charles	Louisiana	Active	
**Zeta Omega Omega**	February 23, 1957	Tacoma	Washington	Active	
**Eta Alpha Omega**	March 16, 1957	Rock Hill	South Carolina	Active	
**Eta Beta Omega**	1958	Centreville	Virginia	Active	
**Eta Gamma Omega**	November 22, 1958	Sacramento	California	Active	
**Eta Delta Omega**	December 13, 1958	Lubbock	Texas	Active	
**Eta Epsilon Omega**	December 13, 1958	Tucson	Arizona	Active	
**Eta Zeta Omega**	February 14, 1959	Sumter	South Carolina	Active	
**Eta Eta Omega**	February 28, 1959	Fort Pierce	Florida	Active	
**Eta Theta Omega**		Greenville	Mississippi	Active	
**Eta Iota Omega**	February 6, 1960	Inkster	Michigan	Active	
**Eta Kappa Omega**		East Chicago	Indiana	Active	
**Eta Lambda Omega**	March 6, 1960	Pasadena	California	Active	
**Eta Mu Omega**		South Bend	Indiana	Active	
**Eta Nu Omega**		Riverside	California	Active	
**Eta Xi Omega**	November 11, 1961	Tuscaloosa	Alabama	Active	
**Eta Omicron Omega**	November 18, 1961	High Point	North Carolina	Active	
**Eta Pi Omega**	November 24, 1961	El Paso	Texas	Active	
**Eta Rho Omega**	December 2, 1961	San Jose	California	Active	(Note: Chapter originally had a mixed charter for both graduate and collegiate members. Later, the undergraduates formed the Zeta Psi chapter at San Jose State University and the Xi Beta chapter at Stanford University.)
**Eta Sigma Omega**	December 21, 1961	Marianna	Arkansas	Active	(Note: Chapter was created to serve Marianna and Helena but became the Marianna chapter when the Mu Chi Omega chapter was chartered in Helena in 1979.)
**Eta Tau Omega**	February 10, 1962	Ocala	Florida	Active	
**Eta Upsilon Omega**	February 1, 1962	Saginaw	Michigan	Active	
**Eta Phi Omega**		Charlottesville	Virginia	Active	
**Eta Chi Omega**	March 30, 1963	Lafayette	Louisiana	Active	
**Eta Psi Omega**	September 21, 1963	Nassau	The Bahamas	Active	
**Eta Omega Omega**	May 23, 1964	Bronx, New York City	New York	Active	
**Theta Alpha Omega**	October 25, 1964	Long Beach	California	Active	
**Theta Beta Omega**	November 21, 1964	New Bern	North Carolina	Active	(Note: Chapter was an outgrowth of Zeta Omicron Omega chapter.)
Theta Gamma Omega		Abilene	Texas	Inactive	
**Theta Delta Omega**	November 28, 1964	Midland	Texas	Active	
**Theta Epsilon Omega**	January 17, 1965	New Haven	Connecticut	Active	
**Theta Zeta Omega**	May 15, 1965	Ocean Springs	Mississippi	Active	
**Theta Eta Omega**		Humboldt	Tennessee	Active	
**Theta Theta Omega**	May 23, 1965	Las Vegas	Nevada	Active	
**Theta Iota Omega**	October 29, 1966	West Hempstead	New York	Active	
**Theta Kappa Omega**	November 5, 1966	Atlantic City	New Jersey	Active	
**Theta Lambda Omega**	November 19, 1966	Pontiac	Michigan	Active	
**Theta Mu Omega**	December 18, 1966	Los Angeles	California	Active	
**Theta Nu Omega**	February 4, 1967	Fort Myers	Florida	Active	
**Theta Xi Omega**		LaGrange	Georgia	Active	
**Theta Omicron Omega**	May 27, 1967	Cedartown	Georgia	Active	
**Theta Pi Omega**	November 11, 1967	Blackwood	New Jersey	Active	
**Theta Rho Omega**	November 17, 1968	Matteson	Illinois	Active	
**Theta Sigma Omega**	November 16, 1968	Hattiesburg	Mississippi	Active	
**Theta Tau Omega**	November 23, 1968	Bridgeport	Connecticut	Active	
**Theta Upsilon Omega**	November 29, 1968	Lawton	Oklahoma	Active	
**Theta Phi Omega**	December 14, 1968	Plainfield	New Jersey	Active	
**Theta Chi Omega**	October 4, 1969	Grand Rapids	Michigan	Active	
**Theta Psi Omega**	October 19, 1969	Providence	Rhode Island	Active	
**Theta Omega Omega**	November 22, 1969	Silver Spring	Maryland	Active	
**Iota Alpha Omega**	December 6, 1969	Poughkeepsie	New York	Active	
**Iota Beta Omega**	November 14, 1970	Colorado Springs	Colorado	Active	
**Iota Gamma Omega**	November 14, 1970	Lanham	Maryland	Active	
**Iota Delta Omega**	December 5, 1970	Clarksdale	Mississippi	Active	
**Iota Epsilon Omega**	January 31, 1971	Teaneck	New Jersey	Active	
**Iota Zeta Omega**	1971	Des Moines	Iowa	Active	
**Iota Eta Omega**		Franklin	Louisiana	Active	
**Iota Theta Omega**		Lancaster	South Carolina	Active	
**Iota Iota Omega**	October 7, 1972	Benton Harbor	Michigan	Active	
**Iota Kappa Omega**	October 28, 1972	Greenville	North Carolina	Active	
**Iota Lambda Omega**	October 7, 1972	Columbia	Maryland	Active	
**Iota Mu Omega**		Anniston	Alabama	Active	
**Iota Nu Omega**	November 11, 1972	Syracuse	New York	Active	
**Iota Xi Omega**		Albuquerque	New Mexico	Active	
**Iota Omicron Omega**	December 16, 1972	Clovis	California	Active	(Note: This chapter formed from the citywide Alpha Nu (Third) chapter.)
**Iota Pi Omega**	December 16, 1972	Rockledge	Florida	Active	
**Iota Rho Omega**		Minden	Louisiana	Active	
**Iota Sigma Omega**	October 27, 1973	Kalamazoo	Michigan	Active	
**Iota Tau Omega**	November 10, 1973	West Chester	Pennsylvania	Active	
**Iota Upsilon Omega**	December 1, 1973	Greenwood	South Carolina	Active	
**Iota Phi Omega**	December 1973	Elyria	Ohio	Active	
**Iota Chi Omega**	December 15, 1973	Fort Wayne	Indiana	Active	
**Iota Psi Omega**	1973	Athens	Georgia	Active	
**Iota Omega Omega**	January 5, 1974	Camden	South Carolina	Active	
**Kappa Alpha Omega**	April 16, 1974	Itta Bena	Mississippi	Active	
**Kappa Beta Omega**	March 23, 1974	Vellejo	California	Active	
**Kappa Gamma Omega**	April 27, 1974	Seaside	California	Active	
**Kappa Delta Omega**	May 25, 1974	Martinsville	Virginia	Active	
Kappa Epsilon Omega		Muncie and Anderson	Indiana	Inactive ?	
**Kappa Zeta Omega**		Anderson	South Carolina	Active	
**Kappa Eta Omega**	June 1974	Valdosta	Georgia	Active	
**Kappa Theta Omega**	October 26, 1985	Easton	Maryland	Active	
**Kappa Iota Omega**		Garysburg	North Carolina	Active	
**Kappa Kappa Omega**	December 14, 1974	Pompano Beach	Florida	Active	
**Kappa Lambda Omega**	January 25, 1976	Nashville	Tennessee	Active	
**Kappa Mu Omega**	1975	Joliet	Illinois	Active	
**Kappa Nu Omega**	June 29, 1975	Jonesboro	Arkansas	Active	
**Kappa Xi Omega**		Texarkana	Texas	Active	
**Kappa Omicron Omega**		Bartow	Florida	Active	
**Kappa Pi Omega**	1976	Daleville	Alabama	Active	
**Kappa Rho Omega**	March 6, 1976	Farmville	Virginia	Active	
**Kappa Sigma Omega**	April 10, 1976	Sanford	Florida	Active	
**Kappa Tau Omega**	May 10, 1976	Bloomington	Indiana	Active	
**Kappa Upsilon Omega**	April 14, 1976	Aiken	South Carolina	Active	
**Kappa Phi Omega**	1976	Muscle Shoals	Alabama	Active	
**Kappa Chi Omega**		Columbia	Missouri	Active	
**Kappa Psi Omega**	May 15, 1976	Madison	Wisconsin	Active	
**Kappa Omega Omega**	May 13, 1976	Bakersfield	California	Active	
**Lambda Alpha Omega**	May 29, 1976	Westchester	Illinois	Active	
**Lambda Beta Omega**	June 5, 1976	Opelousas	Louisiana	Active	
Lambda Gamma Omega				Inactive ?	
**Lambda Delta Omega**	June 15, 1976	Williamston	North Carolina	Active	
**Lambda Epsilon Omega**	June 26, 1976	Decatur	Georgia	Active	
**Lambda Zeta Omega**		Lanett	Alabama	Active	
**Lambda Eta Omega**	October 23, 1976	Gadsden	Alabama	Active	
**Lambda Theta Omega**	December 4, 1976	Kingstree	South Carolina	Active	
**Lambda Iota Omega**	December 11, 1976	Gainesville	Georgia	Active	
**Lambda Kappa Omega**	December 18, 1976	Fairfax	Virginia	Active	
**Lambda Lambda Omega**		Williamsburg	Virginia	Active	
**Lambda Mu Omega**		Chicago	Illinois	Active	
**Lambda Nu Omega**	May 27, 1977	Waukegan	Illinois	Active	
**Lambda Xi Omega**	July 9, 1977	Thomasville	Georgia	Active	
**Lambda Omicron Omega**	August 13, 1977	Bradenton	Florida	Active	
**Lambda Pi Omega**	September 10, 1977	Detroit	Michigan	Active	
**Lambda Rho Omega**	1977	Gaffney	South Carolina	Active	
**Lambda Sigma Omega**		Blytheville	Arkansas	Active	
**Lambda Tau Omega**	February 26, 1978	Matteson	Illinois	Active	
**Lambda Upsilon Omega**	March 12, 1978	Concord	North Carolina	Active	
**Lambda Phi Omega**	March 18, 1978	Cleveland	Ohio	Active	
**Lambda Chi Omega**	March 24, 1978	Honolulu	Hawaii	Active	
**Lambda Psi Omega**		Franklin	Virginia	Active	
**Lambda Omega Omega**	April 23, 1978	Oakhurst	New Jersey	Active	
**Mu Alpha Omega**	April 22, 1978	Midland	Michigan	Active	
**Mu Beta Omega**	May 21, 1978	Inglewood	California	Active	(Note: Chapter was originally the Ladies of Alpha Kappa Alpha, organized by members of Theta Mu Omega chapter on January 6, 1978, to create a new chapter in the Los Angeles area.)
**Mu Gamma Omega**	May 26, 1978	Saint Croix	United States Virgin Islands	Active	
**Mu Delta Omega**	June 3, 1978 – 1994; June 2, 2012	Fort Knox	Kentucky	Active	
**Mu Epsilon Omega**	June 4, 1978	Santa Ana	California	Active	
**Mu Zeta Omega**		Stockton	California	Active	
**Mu Eta Omega**	June 16, 1978	Junction City	Kansas	Active	
**Mu Theta Omega**	June 17, 1978	Killeen	Texas	Active	
**Mu Iota Omega**	June 22, 1978	Conway	South Carolina	Active	
**Mu Kappa Omega**	June 24, 1978	Missouri City	Texas	Active	
**Mu Lambda Omega**	June 25, 1978	Culver City	California	Active	
**Mu Mu Omega**		Huntsville	Texas	Active	
**Mu Nu Omega**	July 9, 1978	Erie	Pennsylvania	Active	
**Mu Xi Omega**	December 17, 1978	Vicksburg	Mississippi	Active	
**Mu Omicron Omega**	January 28, 1979	Chapel Hill	North Carolina	Active	
Mu Pi Omega				Inactive ?	
**Mu Rho Omega**	May 10, 1982	Bell Glade	Florida	Active	
**Mu Sigma Omega**	August 18, 1979	Opelika	Alabama	Active	
**Mu Tau Omega**	September 8, 1979	Talladega	Alabama	Active	
**Mu Upsilon Omega**	August 25, 1979	Gainesville	Florida	Active	
**Mu Phi Omega**	September 15, 1979	Georgetown	South Carolina	Active	
**Mu Chi Omega**	October 14, 1979	Helena	Arkansas	Active	(Note: Chapter originated as part of the Eta Sigma Omega chapter.)
**Mu Psi Omega**	November 24, 1979		Germany	Active	
**Mu Omega Omega**	December 15, 1979	Aurora	Colorado	Active	
**Nu Alpha Omega**	January 19, 1980	Moncks Corner	South Carolina	Active	
**Nu Beta Omega**	January 26, 1980	Clearwater	Florida	Active	
**Nu Gamma Omega**	February 16, 1980	Baton Rouge	Louisiana	Active	
**Nu Delta Omega**	March 29, 1980	Beaufort	South Carolina	Active	
**Nu Epsilon Omega**		Columbus	Mississippi	Active	
**Nu Zeta Omega**	April 19, 1980	Waldorf	Maryland	Active	
**Nu Eta Omega**		Edenton	North Carolina	Active	
**Nu Theta Omega**		Laurens	South Carolina	Active	
**Nu Iota Omega**	June 28, 1980	Maitland	Florida	Active	
**Nu Kappa Omega**		Clarksville	Tennessee	Active	
**Nu Lambda Omega**	September 13, 1980	Atlanta	Georgia	Active	
Nu Mu Omega				Inactive ?	
**Nu Nu Omega**	1980	Livingston	Alabama	Active	
**Nu Xi Omega**	December 6, 1980	New Brunswick	New Jersey	Active	
**Nu Omicron Omega**		Springfield	Illinois	Active	
**Nu Pi Omega**	December 14, 1980	Peoria	Illinois	Active	
**Nu Rho Omega**	December 13, 1980	Hinesville	Georgia	Active	
**Nu Sigma Omega**	December 20, 1980	Tupelo	Mississippi	Active	
**Nu Tau Omega**		Denmark	South Carolina	Active	
**Nu Upsilon Omega**		Midville	Georgia	Active	
**Nu Phi Omega**	April 12, 1981	Muskegon	Michigan	Active	
**Nu Chi Omega**	May 23, 1981	Oxford	North Carolina	Active	
**Nu Psi Omega**	1981	Utica	New York	Active	
**Nu Omega Omega**	October 31, 1981	Madison	Florida	Active	
**Xi Alpha Omega**	December 6, 1981	Houston	Texas	Active	
**Xi Beta Omega**	December 13, 1981	Griffin	Georgia	Active	
**Xi Gamma Omega**	May 1, 1982	Oakland	California	Active	
**Xi Delta Omega**	April 24, 1982	Harford County and Cecil County	Maryland	Active	
**Xi Epsilon Omega**	December 21, 1981	Amherst	New York	Active	
**Xi Zeta Omega**	January 16, 1982	Washington	District of Columbia	Active	
**Xi Eta Omega**	1982	Moline	Illinois	Active	
**Xi Theta Omega**	May 14, 1982	Arlington	Texas	Active	
**Xi Iota Omega**	May 22, 1982	Oak Ridge	Tennessee	Active	
**Xi Kappa Omega**	June 19, 1982	Oxnard	Carlifornia	Active	
**Xi Lambda Omega**	June 26, 1982	Ripley	Tennessee	Active	
**Xi Mu Omega**	June 27, 1982	Columbia	Mississippi	Active	
**Xi Nu Omega**	July 9, 1982	Chicago	Illinois	Active	
**Xi Xi Omega**	July 14, 1982	Springfield	Massachusetts	Active	
**Xi Omicron Omega**	January 29, 1983	Lynn Haven	Florida	Active	
**Xi Pi Omega**	February 26, 1983	Boynton Beach	Florida	Active	
**Xi Rho Omega**		Ahoskie	North Carolina	Active	
**Xi Sigma Omega**	June 11, 1983	Germantown	Maryland	Active	
**Xi Tau Omega**	July 16, 1983	Kansas City	Missouri	Active	
**Xi Upsilon Omega**		Fredericksburg	Virginia	Active	
**Xi Phi Omega**	October 2, 1983	Hickory	North Carolina	Active	
**Xi Chi Omega**	October 15, 1983	Peeksill	New York	Active	
**Xi Psi Omega**	October 21, 1983	Anchorage	Alaska	Active	
**Xi Omega Omega**	November 5, 1983	Walterboro	South Carolina	Active	
**Omicron Alpha Omega**		Holly Springs	Mississippi	Active	
**Omicron Beta Omega**	December 18, 1983	Meridian	Mississippi	Active	
**Omicron Gamma Omega**	March 24, 1984	Glen Burnie	Maryland	Active	
**Omicron Delta Omega**	March 24, 1984	Bloomington	Illinois	Active	
**Omicron Epsilon Omega**	March 24, 1984	Wichita Falls	Texas	Active	
**Omicron Zeta Omega**		Cheraw	South Carolina	Active	
**Omicron Eta Omega**	May 26, 1984	St. Louis	Missouri	Active	
**Omicron Theta Omega**	May 27, 1984	St. Louis	Missouri	Active	
**Omicron Iota Omega**		West Monroe	Louisiana	Active	
**Omicron Kappa Omega**	June 2, 1984	Lakeland	Florida	Active	
**Omicron Lambda Omega**	June 16, 1984	New Orleans	Louisiana	Active	
**Omicron Mu Omega**	June 23, 1984	Dallas	Texas	Active	
**Omicron Nu Omega**		Ithaca	New York	Active	
**Omicron Xi Omega**	June 30, 1984	Montclair	New Jersey	Active	
**Omicron Omicron Omega**	October 6, 1984	Marion	South Carolina	Active	
**Omicron Pi Omega**	1984	Chesapeake	Virginia	Active	
**Omicron Rho Omega**	1985	North Charleston	South Carolina	Active	
**Omicron Sigma Omega**	May 31, 1985	Bowling Green	Kentucky	Active	
**Omicron Tau Omega**	March 31, 1985	Spring	Texas	Active	
**Omicron Upsilon Omega**	April 27, 1985	Norwalk	Connecticut	Active	
**Omicron Phi Omega**	May 18, 1985	Kokomo	Indiana	Active	
**Omicron Chi Omega**	May 19, 1985	Woodbridge	Virginia	Active	
**Omicron Psi Omega**		Lexington	North Carolina	Active	
**Omicron Omega Omega**	June 15, 1985	Southern Pines	North Carolina	Active	
**Pi Alpha Omega**	September 21, 1985	Atlanta	Georgia	Active	
**Pi Beta Omega**	November 16, 1985	Newberry	South Carolina	Active	
**Pi Gamma Omega**		Rockford	Illinois	Active	
**Pi Delta Omega**	February 8, 1985	Miami	Florida	Active	
**Pi Epsilon Omega**	May 24, 1986	Accomack County and Northampton County	Virginia	Active	
**Pi Zeta Omega**	May 24, 1986	Greer	South Carolina	Active	
**Pi Eta Omega**	May 31, 1986	Orange Park	Florida	Active	
**Pi Theta Omega**	May 31, 1987	Morristown	New Jersey	Active	
**Pi Iota Omega**	June 14, 1986	White Plains	New York	Active	
**Pi Kappa Omega**	June 28, 1986	New York City	New York	Active	
**Pi Lambda Omega**	June 28, 1986	Louisville	Kentucky	Active	
**Pi Mu Omega**	1986	Willingboro	New Jersey	Active	
**Pi Nu Omega**	July 6, 1987	Murfreesboro	Tennessee	Active	
**Pi Xi Omega**	July 7, 1986	Paterson	New Jersey	Active	
**Pi Omicron Omega**	December 7, 1986	Burlington	North Carolina	Active	
**Pi Pi Omega**		Westbury	New York	Active	
**Pi Rho Omega**	April 4, 1987	North Chesterfield	Virginia	Active	
**Pi Sigma Omega**	May 9, 1987	Cerritos	California	Active	
**Pi Tau Omega**		Southfield	Michigan	Active	
**Pi Upsilon Omega**	May 23, 1987	Fort Lauderdale	Florida	Active	
**Pi Phi Omega**	May 30, 1987	Forest Hills, Queens	New York	Active	
**Pi Chi Omega**	June 6, 1987	West Memphis	Arkansas	Active	
**Pi Psi Omega**		Spring Valley	New York	Active	
**Pi Omega Omega**		Kingsport	Tennessee	Active	
**Rho Alpha Omega**		Laurinburg	North Carolina	Active	
**Rho Beta Omega**		Natchitoches	Louisiana	Active	
**Rho Gamma Omega**	September 6, 1987	South Orange	New Jersey	Active	
**Rho Delta Omega**	January 9, 1988	Palo Alto	California	Active	
**Rho Epsilon Omega**	January 23, 1988	Wellesley	Massachusetts	Active	
**Rho Zeta Omega**	April 30, 1988	Marietta	Georgia	Active	
**Rho Eta Omega**	May 21, 1988	Richmond	Virginia	Active	
**Rho Theta Omega**	May 22, 1988	Philadelphia	Pennsylvania	Active	
**Rho Iota Omega**	June 25, 1988	Odessa	Texas	Active	
**Rho Kappa Omega**	September 18, 1988	Jersey City	New Jersey	Active	
**Rho Lambda Omega**	October 23, 1988	Jackson	Mississippi	Active	
**Rho Mu Omega**	October 30, 1988	Washington	District of Columbia	Active	
**Rho Nu Omega**	November 26, 1988	Seoul	South Korea	Active	
**Rho Xi Omega**	December 3, 1988	Pikesville	Maryland	Active	
**Rho Omicron Omega**	December 10, 1988	Baytown	Texas	Active	
**Rho Pi Omega**		Harvey	Louisiana	Active	
**Rho Rho Omega**	January 1989	Columbus	Georgia	Active	
**Rho Sigma Omega**		Americus	Georgia	Active	
**Rho Tau Omega**	March 19, 1989	Warrenton	North Carolina	Active	
**Rho Upsilon Omega**	May 6, 1989	San Ramon	California	Active	
**Rho Phi Omega**	May 1989	Bryan	Texas	Active	
**Rho Chi Omega**	July 29, 1989	Madison	Alabama	Active	
**Rho Psi Omega**	June 25, 1989	Charlotte	North Carolina	Active	
**Rho Omega Omega**	1989	Clinton	North Carolina	Active	
**Sigma Alpha Omega**	1989	Tifton	Georgia	Active	
**Sigma Beta Omega**		Camden	Arkansas	Active	
**Sigma Gamma Omega**	December 16, 1989	Harrisonburg	Virginia	Active	
**Sigma Delta Omega**	1990	Elk Grove	California	Active	
**Sigma Epsilon Omega**	January 20, 1990	Warner Robins	Georgia	Active	
**Sigma Zeta Omega**	January 27, 1990	Newark	Delaware	Active	
Sigma Eta Omega				Inactive ?	
**Sigma Theta Omega**	February 3, 1990	Saint Thomas	United States Virgin Islands	Active	
**Sigma Iota Omega**	March 11, 1990	Fairmont	North Carolina	Active	
**Sigma Kappa Omega**	January 18, 1990	Greensboro	North Carolina	Active	
**Sigma Lambda Omega**	April 7, 1990	Van Nuys, Los Angeles	California	Active	
**Sigma Mu Omega**	1990	Lima	Ohio	Active	
**Sigma Nu Omega**		Roxboro	North Carolina	Active	
**Sigma Xi Omega**	May 19, 1990	Devonshire	Bermuda	Active	
**Sigma Omicron Omega**		Fort Walton Beach	Florida	Active	
**Sigma Pi Omega**	May 19, 1990	Torrance	California	Active	
**Sigma Rho Omega**	May 19, 1990	Shreveport	Louisiana	Active	
**Sigma Sigma Omega**		Oklahoma City	Oklahoma	Active	
**Sigma Tau Omega**	June 3, 1990	Cary	North Carolina	Active	
**Sigma Upsilon Omega**	June 17, 1990	Summerville	South Carolina	Active	
**Sigma Phi Omega**	June 21, 1990	Gary	Indiana	Active	
Sigma Chi Omega				Inactive ?	
**Sigma Psi Omega**	June 23, 1990	Malverne	New York	Active	
**Sigma Omega Omega**	December 1990	Douglasville	Georgia	Active	
**Tau Alpha Omega**	March 1991	Redford	Michigan	Active	
**Tau Beta Omega**	April 27, 1991	Marina Del Rey	California	Active	
**Tau Gamma Omega**	November 2, 1991	Chicago	Illinois	Active	
**Tau Delta Omega**	November 10, 1991	Chester	Pennsylvania	Active	
**Tau Epsilon Omega**	November 16, 1991	East Point	Georgia	Active	
**Tau Zeta Omega**	January 18, 1992	Webster	Texas	Active	
**Tau Eta Omega**		Cleveland	Tennessee	Active	
**Tau Theta Omega**		Quincy	Florida	Active	
**Tau Iota Omega**	February 23, 1992	Slidell	Louisiana	Active	
**Tau Kappa Omega**		Plaqemine	Louisiana	Active	
**Tau Lambda Omega**	April 12, 1992	Trotwood	Ohio	Active	
**Tau Mu Omega**	May 17, 1992	Christiansburg	Virginia	Active	
**Tau Nu Omega**	June 13, 1992	Bronx, New York City	New York	Active	
**Tau Xi Omega**	December 12, 1992	Hamden	Connecticut	Active	
**Tau Omicron Omega**		Dublin	Georgia	Active	
**Tau Pi Omega**	January 23, 1993	Stone Mountain	Georgia	Active	
**Tau Rho Omega**	January 23, 1993	Carrollton	Texas	Active	
Tau Sigma Omega				Inactive ?	
**Tau Tau Omega**	February 7, 1993	Santa Monica	California	Active	
**Tau Upsilon Omega**	April 17, 1993	Fairfield	California	Active	
**Tau Phi Omega**	1993	Chester	Virginia	Active	
**Tau Chi Omega**	May 22, 1993	Deland	Florida	Active	
**Tau Psi Omega**		Iowa City	Iowa	Active	
**Tau Omega Omega**		Jacksonville	North Carolina	Active	
**Upsilon Alpha Omega**	January 29, 1994	Lawrenceville	Georgia	Active	
**Upsilon Beta Omega**	May 15, 1994	Murray	Utah	Active	
Upsilon Gamma Omega				Inactive ?	
**Upsilon Delta Omega**	June 18, 1994	Cherry Hill	New Jersey	Active	
**Upsilon Epsilon Omega**	May 26, 1994	Catonsville	Maryland	Active	
**Upsilon Zeta Omega**		Nacagdoches	Texas	Active	
**Upsilon Eta Omega**	April 29, 1995	Fairfield	Alabama	Active	
**Upsilon Theta Omega**	December 2, 1995	Stillwater	Oklahoma	Active	
**Upsilon Iota Omega**	December 16, 1995	Oxford	Mississippi	Active	
**Upsilon Kappa Omega**	December 1, 1996	Fayetteville	North Carolina	Active	
**Upsilon Lambda Omega**	January 11, 1997	DeSoto	Texas	Active	
**Upsilon Mu Omega**	March 29, 1997	Milwaukee	Wisconsin	Active	
Upsilon Nu Omega		Binghamton	New York	Inactive ?	
**Upsilon Xi Omega**	May 31, 1997	Fort Lauderdale	Florida	Active	
**Upsilon Omicron Omega**	June 1, 1997	Norfolk	Virginia	Active	
**Upsilon Pi Omega**		Starkville	Mississippi	Active	
**Upsilon Rho Omega**	June 7, 1997	Lenexa	Kansas	Active	
**Upsilon Sigma Omega**	June 14, 1997	Bennettsville	South Carolina	Active	
**Upsilon Tau Omega**	December 7, 1997	Fort Washington	Maryland	Active	
**Upsilon Upsilon Omega**	January 24, 1998	Canton	Mississippi	Active	
**Upsilon Phi Omega**	January 31, 1998	Edwardsville	Illinois	Active	
**Upsilon Chi Omega**	February 7, 1998	Gulfport	Mississippi	Active	
**Upsilon Psi Omega**	March 14, 1998	Nashville	Tennessee	Active	
**Upsilon Omega Omega**	May 9, 1998	Irmo	South Carolina	Active	
**Phi Alpha Omega**		Bentonville	Arkansas	Active	
**Phi Beta Omega**	June 6, 1998	North Wales	Pennsylvania	Active	
**Phi Gamma Omega**		Pineville	Louisiana	Active	
**Phi Delta Omega**	June 13, 1998	Vidalia	Georgia	Active	
**Phi Epsilon Omega**	1999	Harvey	Illinois	Active	
**Phi Zeta Omega**		Magnolia	Arkansas	Active	
**Phi Eta Omega**	June 6, 1999	Scotch Plains	New Jersey	Active	
Phi Theta Omega				Inactive?	
**Phi Iota Omega**	December 11, 1999	Birmingham	Alabama	Active	
**Phi Kappa Omega**	January 8, 2000	Oak Lawn	Illinois	Active	
**Phi Lambda Omega**	January 8, 2000	Memphis	Tennessee	Active	
**Phi Mu Omega**	January 15, 2000	McComb	Mississippi	Active	
**Phi Nu Omega**	2000	Alexandria	Virginia	Active	
**Phi Xi Omega**	January 13, 2000	San Marcos	Texas	Active	
**Phi Omicron Omega**	February 25, 2000	Okinawa	Japan	Active	
**Phi Pi Omega**	February 25, 2000	Tyrone	Georgia	Active	
**Phi Rho Omega**		Baldwin	Louisiana	Active	
**Phi Sigma Omega**	June 25, 2000	Gonzales	Louisiana	Active	
**Phi Tau Omega**	January 20, 2001	Hapeville	Georgia	Active	
**Phi Upsilon Omega**		Town Creek	Alabama	Active	
**Phi Phi Omega**		Alpharetta	Georgia	Active	
**Phi Chi Omega**	March 10, 2001	Smithfield	Virginia	Active	
**Phi Psi Omega**	January 5, 2002	Forest Park	Ohio	Active	
**Phi Omega Omega**		Alcolu	South Carolina	Active	
**Chi Alpha Omega**	April 14, 2002	Schaumburg	Illinois	Active	
**Chi Beta Omega**	April 18, 2002	Falls Church	Virginia	Active	
**Chi Gamma Omega**		Waycross	Georgia	Active	
**Chi Delta Omega**	July 3, 2002	Palm Coast	Florida	Active	
**Chi Epsilon Omega**	October 20, 2002	East Lansing	Michigan	Active	
**Chi Zeta Omega**	November 23, 2002	Plano	Texas	Active	
**Chi Eta Omega**	February 8, 2003	Conway	Arkansas	Active	
**Chi Theta Omega**	May 17, 2003	Frederick	Maryland	Active	
**Chi Iota Omega**	June 21, 2003	Kenansville	North Carolina	Active	
**Chi Kappa Omega**	June 28, 2003	Lancaster	California	Active	
**Chi Lambda Omega**		Hartsville	South Carolina	Active	
**Chi Mu Omega**	December 6, 2003	Mound Bayou	Mississippi	Active	
**Chi Nu Omega**	December 2003	Arkadelphia	Arkansas	Active	
**Chi Xi Omega**		Decatur	Illinois	Active	
**Chi Omicron Omega**	April 4, 2004	Katy	Texas	Active	
**Chi Pi Omega**	May 22, 2004	Statesboro	Georgia	Active	
**Chi Rho Omega**	August 28, 2004	Knightdale	North Carolina	Active	
**Chi Sigma Omega**	December 5, 2004	Bolingbrook	Illinois	Active	
**Chi Tau Omega**	2004	Conyers	Georgia	Active	
**Chi Upsilon Omega**	December 2004	Tallahassee	Florida	Active	
**Chi Phi Omega**	April 7, 2005	Lafayette	Indiana	Active	
**Chi Chi Omega**	May 21, 2005	Indianapolis	Indiana	Active	
**Chi Psi Omega**	June 12, 2005	Coral Springs	Florida	Active	
**Chi Omega Omega**	June 18, 2005	Chicago	Illinois	Active	
**Psi Alpha Omega**	December 10, 2005	Stockbridge	Georgia	Active	
**Psi Beta Omega**	June 9, 2006	Tokyo	Japan	Active	
**Psi Gamma Omega**	June 17, 2006	Hillsborough	North Carolina	Active	
**Psi Delta Omega**	March 18, 2007	Birmingham	Michigan	Active	
**Psi Epsilon Omega**	April 29, 2007	Laurel	Maryland	Active	
**Psi Zeta Omega**		Knoxville	Tennessee	Active	
**Psi Eta Omega**	May 24, 2008	Columbus	Ohio	Active	
**Psi Theta Omega**	June 28, 2008	Orlando	Florida	Active	
**Psi Iota Omega**	July 6, 2008	Brockton	Massachusetts	Active	
**Psi Kappa Omega**	February 7, 2009	Battle Creek	Michigan	Active	
**Psi Lambda Omega**	February 7, 2009	Brooklyn	New York	Active	
**Psi Mu Omega**	March 19, 2011	Pearland	Texas	Active	
**Psi Nu Omega**	September 24, 2011	Richland	Washington	Active	
**Psi Xi Omega**	November 26, 2011	Alabaster	Alabama	Active	
**Psi Omicron Omega**	December 4, 2011	Pine Hill	Alabama	Active	
**Psi Pi Omega**	December 10, 2011	Stuart	Florida	Active	
**Psi Rho Omega**	June 30, 2012	Leesburg	Virginia	Active	
**Psi Sigma Omega**	June 8, 2013	Garner	North Carolina	Active	
**Psi Tau Omega**	November 24, 2013	Johannesburg	South Africa	Active	
**Psi Upsilon Omega**	December 14, 2013	Henderson	Nevada	Active	
**Psi Phi Omega**	February 16, 2014	Baltimore City	Maryland	Active	
**Psi Chi Omega**		Lincoln	Nebraska	Active	
**Psi Psi Omega**	June 7, 2014	Garrisonville	Virginia	Active	
**Psi Omega Omega**	December 13, 2014	Peachtree Corners	Georgia	Active	
**Omega Alpha Omega**	2015	Frisco	Texas	Active	
**Omega Beta Omega**	May 16, 2015	Yazoo City	Mississippi	Active	
**Omega Gamma Omega**	December 12, 2015	Blythewood	South Carolina	Active	
**Omega Delta Omega**	December 15, 2015	Ontario	California	Active	
**Omega Epsilon Omega**	December 13, 2015	Novi	Michigan	Active	
**Omega Zeta Omega**	December 19, 2015	Langhorne	Pennsylvania	Active	
**Omega Eta Omega**	December 2015	Fulton	Maryland	Active	
**Omega Theta Omega**	January 22, 2016	Abu Dhabi	United Arab Emirates	Active	
**Omega Iota Omega**		Charlotte	North Carolina	Active	
**Omega Kappa Omega**	September 10, 2016	Buies Creek	North Carolina	Active	
**Omega Lambda Omega**	September 11, 2016	Raleigh	North Carolina	Active	
**Omega Mu Omega**	September 18, 2016	Philadelphia	Pennsylvania	Active	
**Omega Nu Omega**	December 10, 2016	Springfield	Missouri	Active	
**Omega Xi Omega**	December 11, 2016	New Haven	Michigan	Active	
**Omega Omicron Omega**	December 18, 2016	San Diego	California	Active	
**Omega Pi Omega**	April 22, 2017	Huntingtown	Maryland	Active	
**Omega Rho Omega**	April 22, 2017	Henrico	Virginia	Active	
**Omega Sigma Omega**	May 23, 2017	Shelby	North Carolina	Active	
**Omega Tau Omega**	December 9, 2017	Fort Mill	South Carolina	Active	
**Omega Upsilon Omega**	December 10, 2017	Concord	California	Active	
**Omega Phi Omega**	December 16, 2017	St. Augustine	Florida	Active	
**Omega Chi Omega**	December 16, 2017	Montgomery	Alabama	Active	
**Omega Psi Omega**	December 16, 2017	Elizabeth	New Jersey	Active	
**Omega Omega Omega**	March 25, 2018	Darlington	South Carolina	Active	
**Alpha Alpha Alpha Omega**	April 14, 2018	Broken Arrow	Oklahoma	Active	
**Alpha Alpha Beta Omega**	April 15, 2018	Miramar	Florida	Active	
**Alpha Alpha Gamma Omega**	May 26, 2018	Bartlett	Tennessee	Active	
**Alpha Alpha Delta Omega**	June 9, 2018	Toronto	Ontario, Canada	Active	
**Alpha Alpha Epsilon Omega**	June 9, 2018	Evans	Georgia	Active	
**Alpha Alpha Zeta Omega**	June 9, 2018	Southaven	Mississippi	Active	
**Alpha Alpha Eta Omega**	June 9, 2018	Cypress	Texas	Active	
**Alpha Alpha Theta Omega**	June 30, 2018	Tampa	Florida	Active	
**Alpha Alpha Iota Omega**	December 2, 2018	Laveen, Phoenix	Arizona	Active	
**Alpha Alpha Kappa Omega**	May 19, 2019	Houston	Texas	Active	
**Alpha Alpha Lambda Omega**	December 8, 2019	College Park	Maryland	Active	
**Alpha Alpha Mu Omega**	January 12, 2020	Sussex County	Delaware	Active	
**Alpha Alpha Nu Omega**	November 2, 2019	Round Rock	Texas	Active	
**Alpha Alpha Xi Omega**	March 7, 2020	San Antonio	Texas	Active	
**Alpha Alpha Omicron Omega**	March 7, 2021	Kaufman County and Rockwall County	Texas	Active	
**Alpha Alpha Pi Omega**	March 14, 2021	South Gwinnett County	Georgia	Active	
**Alpha Alpha Rho Omega**	May 15, 2021	Benton	Arkansas	Active	
**Alpha Alpha Sigma Omega**	May 17, 2021	Brandywine	Maryland	Active	
**Alpha Alpha Tau Omega**	May 16, 2021	Middletown	Delaware	Active	
**Alpha Alpha Upsilon Omega**	June 6, 2021	Wellington	Florida	Active	
**Alpha Alpha Phi Omega**	June 19, 2021	Milledgeville	Georgia	Active	
**Alpha Alpha Chi Omega**	June 26, 2021	Anson County and Union County	North Carolina	Active	
**Alpha Alpha Psi Omega**	June 27, 2021	Paulding County	Georgia	Active	
**Alpha Alpha Omega Omega**	June 30, 2021	Lagos	Nigeria	Active	
**Alpha Beta Alpha Omega**	December 5, 2021	Springfield	Virginia	Active	
**Alpha Beta Beta Omega**	December 5, 2021	Canton	Ohio	Active	
**Alpha Beta Gamma Omega**	December 5, 2021	Dundalk	Maryrland	Active	
**Alpha Beta Delta Omega**	December 12, 2021	Chicago	Illinois	Active	
**Alpha Beta Epsilon Omega**	December 12, 2021	Immokalee	Florida	Active	
**Alpha Beta Zeta Omega**	December 21, 2021	Belleville	Illinois	Active	
**Alpha Beta Eta Omega**	January 9, 2022	Jacksonville	Florida	Active	
**Alpha Beta Theta Omega**	May 7, 2022	Laurel	Mississippi	Active	
**Alpha Beta Iota Omega**	May 14, 2022	Bedford	Texas	Active	
**Alpha Beta Kappa Omega**		Nashville	Tennessee	Active	
**Alpha Beta Lambda Omega**	May 15, 2022	Brookhaven	Georgia	Active	
**Alpha Beta Mu Omega**	May 21, 2022	Mobile	Alabama	Active	
**Alpha Beta Nu Omega**	June 4, 2022	Eutaw	Alabama	Active	
**Alpha Beta Xi Omega**	June 5, 2022	Trussville	Alabama	Active	
**Alpha Beta Omicron Omega**	June 12, 2022	Phenix City	Alabama	Active	
**Alpha Beta Pi Omega**	June 12, 2022	Staten Island, New York City	New York	Active	
**Alpha Beta Rho Omega**	June 14, 2022	Paramus	New Jersey	Active	
**Alpha Beta Sigma Omega**	June 18, 2022	Apopka	Florida	Active	
**Alpha Beta Tau Omega**	June 25, 2022	Batesville	Mississippi	Active	
**Alpha Beta Upsilon Omega**	June 26, 2022	Washington	District of Columbia	Active	
**Alpha Beta Phi Omega**		Grand Prairie	Texas	Active	
**Alpha Beta Chi Omega**	May 6, 2023	York	Pennsylvania	Active	
