= John Niemeyer =

John Niemeyer may refer to:

- John H. Niemeyer, president of Bank Street College of Education
- John Henry Niemeyer, German-born painter in the United States
