= Ron Perry (basketball, born 1943) =

American basketball player (born 1943)

Personal information
- Born: December 29, 1943 (age 82) Garrisonville, Virginia, U.S.
- Listed height: 6 ft 3 in (1.91 m)
- Listed weight: 190 lb (86 kg)

Career information
- High school: Stafford (Falmouth, Virginia)
- College: Virginia Tech (1964–1967)
- NBA draft: 1967: 7th round, 68th overall pick
- Drafted by: Baltimore Bullets
- Playing career: 1967–1970
- Position: Point guard / shooting guard
- Number: 22, 44, 21, 12

Career history
- 1967–1968: Minnesota Muskies / Miami Floridians
- 1968–1969: New York Nets
- 1969: Indiana Pacers
- 1969: Carolina Cougars
- 1970: New Orleans Buccaneers
- Stats at Basketball Reference

Ron Perry (born December 29, 1943) is an American former basketball player. He played several seasons in the American Basketball Association (ABA).

Born in Garrisonville, Virginia, Perry went to Stafford High School and Virginia Tech. He was drafted by the Baltimore Bullets of the NBA in the seventh round of the 1967 NBA draft.
