= Bessie Locke =

American educator

- Locke pictured around 1930
- Born: August 7, 1865; West Cambridge, Massachusetts, U.S.
- Died: April 9, 1952 (aged 86); Manhattan, New York, U.S.
- Resting place: Hope Cemetery, Kennebunk, Maine, U.S.
- Occupation: Educator
- Known for: Founding the National Kindergarten Association

Bessie Locke (August 7, 1865 – April 9, 1952) was an American educator and businessperson. In 1909, she founded the National Kindergarten Association, which promoted universal acceptance of the public-school kindergarten.

== Early life ==
Locke was born in 1865 in West Cambridge, Massachusetts (today's Arlington), to William Henry Locke and Jane MacFarland Schouler. Her father was a printer, but lost his business in the Panic of 1869. The family moved to Brooklyn, New York, where Bessie attended a private kindergarten, one that was amongst only a few in the United States at the time that was English-speaking.

She was educated in the public schools of Brooklyn, working as a teenager as a bookkeeper, before attending Columbia University; she did not obtain a degree, however.

== Career ==
After a two-year stint as an assistant to the pastor of All Souls Church in Brooklyn, Locke managed a hat-making store in North Carolina which was owned by her uncle.

In 1892, she visited a kindergarten in New York City which was operated by an acquaintance of hers. Impressed by the results of the children's education, she founded the East End Kindergarten Union of Brooklyn and, later, the Brooklyn Free Kindergarten Society. In 1899, she organized the New York Kindergarten Society.

=== National Kindergarten Association ===
Locke founded the National Association for the Promotion of Kindergarten Education in 1909. It became the National Kindergarten Association two years later. The company was initially based in New York City's brand-new Metropolitan Life Insurance Company Tower, located at 1 Madison Avenue in Manhattan, but later moved one mile north to 8 West 40th Street, on the southern side of Bryant Park. Locke's sister, May Aldrich, was the company's secretary and a director from the time of its establishment until her death, aged 80, in 1958.

One of several additional positions Locke held was as director of the National Council of Women of the United States. She was also an honorary vice-president of the International Council of Women.

== Death ==
Locke died in 1952, aged 86. She was buried in Hope Cemetery, Kennebunk, Maine, alongside her parents, who had retired to the town in the late 19th century, and several siblings. Her mother died in 1900, when Locke was around 35 years old; her father died in 1917, aged 79 or 80.

Her business remained in operation for the next 24 years, dissolving in 1976.
