= Patti Ann's =

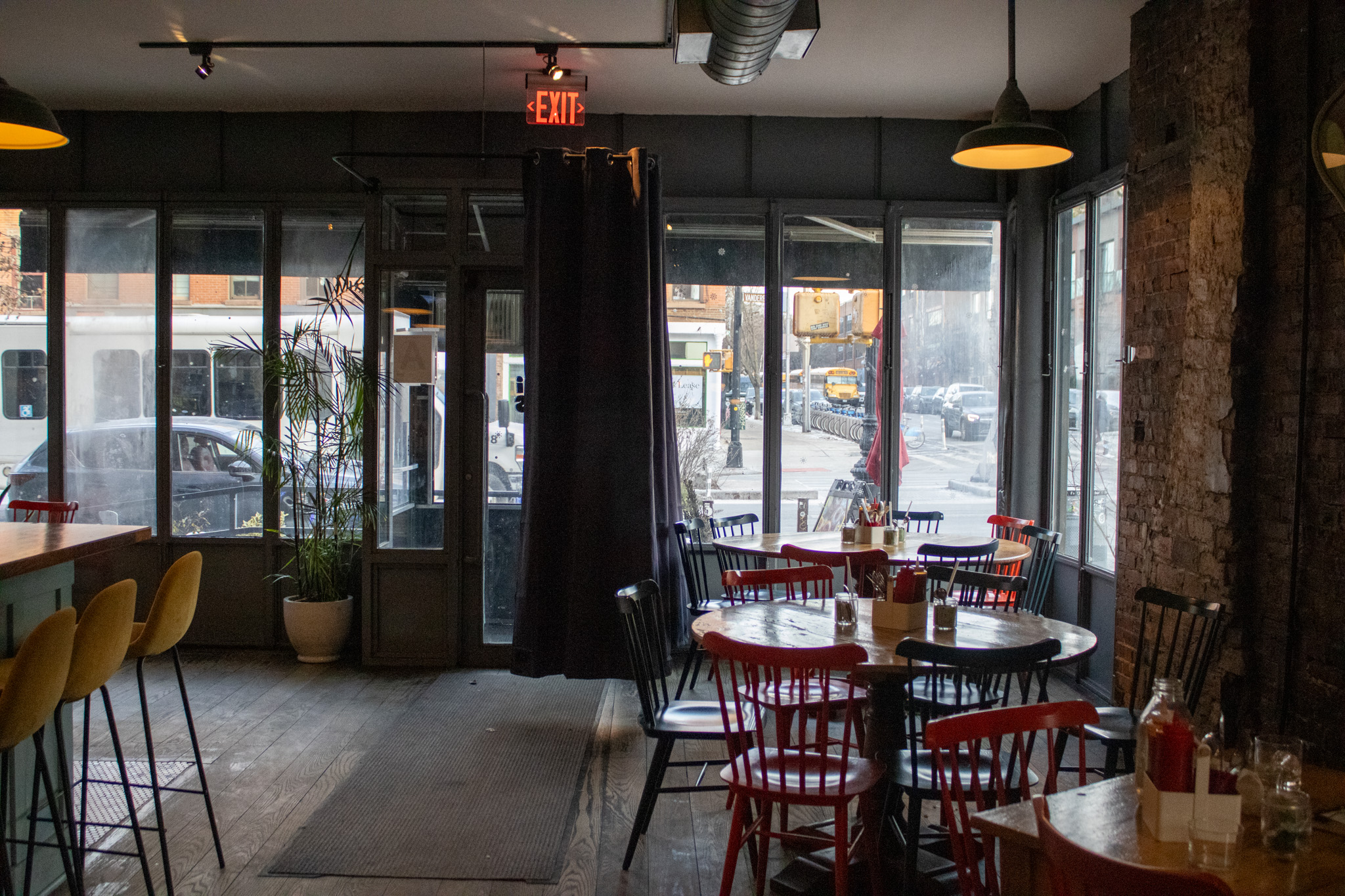
- Patti Ann's interior
- Interactive map of Patti Ann's

Restaurant information
- Established: March 2022
- Location: 570 Vanderbilt Avenue, Brooklyn, New York, 11238, United States
- Coordinates: 40°40′46.5″N 73°58′6.5″W

Patti Ann's was a restaurant in the Prospect Heights neighborhood of Brooklyn. The restaurant served food inspired by the cuisine of the Midwestern United States. The restaurant closed in 2025.

== History ==
Chef and owner Greg Baxtrom signed a lease for the space now occupied by Patti Ann's before the COVID-19 pandemic. Originally, Baxtrom planned to open a raw bar in the space, and has said he intended to "rip off Joe's Stone Crab".

Patti Ann's opened in March 2022. Baxtrom named the restaurant for his mother, and components of the restaurant's interior were built by Baxtrom's father, a carpenter. Baxtrom also operates Olmsted and several other restaurants located near Patti Ann's.

=== Food and menu ===
The restaurant served food inspired by the cuisine of the Midwestern United States. The restaurant began serving tavern-style pizza in early 2023, Baxtrom has said serving tavern-style pizza was "always...eventually" the plan for Patti Ann's.

Baxtrom, owner of the restaurant, grew up in the Midwest, south of Chicago.

== Reviews ==
Eater New York included the restaurant on its list of "Most Anticipated" restaurant openings in New York City for spring 2022.

In a review published by Grub Street, Adam Platt praised the restaurant, writing that he had "never tasted a bad thing" at Patti Ann's, other than a "grimly realistic reimagining...of a midwestern shrimp cocktail".

Nikita Richardson included the restaurant on a list of restaurants to take one's "picky parents" published by The New York Times. Richardson praised the restaurant as "just fun" though noted that some menu items did "overdo it".
