= Harriet Frances Carpenter =

American educator, writer, and suffragist

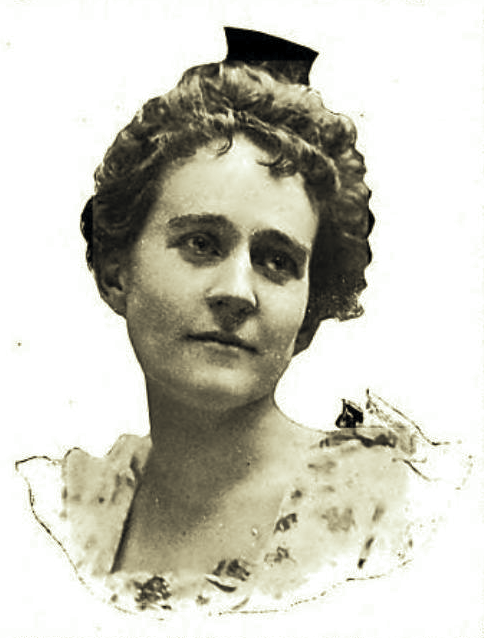
- Carpenter c. 1917
- Born: 1868/75; Lyons, Iowa, U.S.
- Died: August 16, 1956; Branchville, New Jersey, U.S.
- Resting place: Long Hill Cemetery
- Education: Chicago Kindergarten College
- Occupations: educator; writer; suffragist
- Writing career
- Genres: non-fiction; essays; plays
- Subject: Children
- Notable works: Mother Play in Story, vols. 1 & 2

Harriet Frances Carpenter (1868/75 – August 16, 1956) was an American educator and author, as well as a woman's suffrage activist throughout New Jersey.

After graduating from the Chicago Kindergarten College, her career specialized in early childhood education at various institutions. In addition to her book Mother Play in Story, Carpenter published several essays and wrote and directed dramas.

== Early life and education ==
Harriet (nickname, "Pearl") Frances Carpenter was born at Lyons, Iowa, on June 6, 1875. (Note: According to her obituary in The Courier-News of Bridgewater Township, New Jersey (1956), Carpenter was born in 1868.) Her parents were Abraham and Mary Carpenter. She was descended from an old colonial Pennsylvania family, but her grandfather had moved west. Her father owned large wheat ranges in North Dakota. As a sick child, she was sent to Montana, where she developed a love of nature.

She was educated by tutors and at Chicago Kindergarten College, where she graduated the highest honors in her class.

== Career ==
=== Educational work ===
Upon graduating, Carpenter became superintendent of the Cincinnati Free Kindergarten Training School and supervisor of thirty kindergartens. She was a charter member of the Cincinnati Woman's Club and delivered lectures to its members on children's literature and dramatic music which drew on her experience visiting Bayreuth.

After a few years, Carpenter moved to New York City to study interpretive art. While there, she took charge of the Newark, New Jersey public kindergarten system. Beginning in 1898, she led courses in kindergarten instruction at the city normal school (today known as Kean University).

=== Social activism ===
Carpenter was a suffragist who supported women's suffrage on the grounds of opposition to taxation without representation. In 1912, she sued the state of New Jersey for the right to vote as a property holder, arguing that the right to vote had once been held by New Jersey women and had been revoked illegally. Her case was defeated at the Supreme Court of New Jersey.

== Personal life ==
Carpenter lived in her country home on Long Hill Road, in the Millington section of Long Hill Township, New Jersey.

Harriet Frances Carpenter died in Branchville, New Jersey, August 16, 1956, and was interred at Long Hill Cemetery.

== Selected works ==
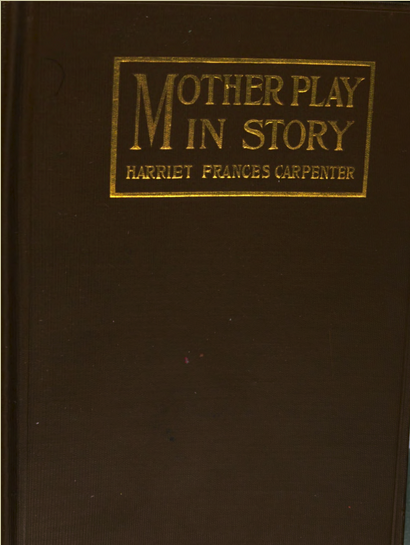
Mother Play in Story, vol. 2 (1916)

=== Books ===
- Carpenter, Harriet Frances (1915). Mother Play in Story, vol. 1. New York: Baker & Taylor.
- Carpenter, Harriet Frances (1916). Mother Play in Story, vol. 2. New York: Baker & Taylor.

=== Essays ===
- "The Real Mother (1918), Christian Register and Boston Observer
- "The Nurture-Power of Mothers" (1918), Christian Register and Boston Observer
- "Little Every-day Wrong-doings" (1918), Christian Register and Boston Observer
- "Training little children (1918), The Kindergarten-primary Magazine
- "The World of the Child is One of Perpetual Imagination" (1919), The Juvenile Court Record
- "The real mother is careful to train her child's character" (1919), Training Little Children: Suggestion for Parents
- "The careful mother ponders the effects of her child's actions" (1919), Training Little Children: Suggestion for Parents
- "The influence and inspiration of spiritual motherhood" (1919), Training Little Children: Suggestion for Parents

=== Plays ===
- The White Bear (1908)
- Hansel and Gretel (1908)
- An Easter Fete (1908)
- Cupid and Psyche (1908)
