= National Kindergarten Association =

American organization promoting universal public school kindergarten

- Official letterhead used by the organization
- Abbreviation: NKA
- Founded: 1909
- Founder: Bessie Locke
- Defunct: 1976
- Purpose: Promoting universal acceptance of the public-school kindergarten
- Headquarters: National Kindergarten Association; 8 West 40th Street
- Location: New York City, U.S.
- Region served: United States
- Services: Education
- Method: Lobbying; Publications; Outreach programs
- Key people: • Edwin S. Marston (president in 1911) • Major Bradley Martin (president in 1922) • Dr. Howard R. Best (president until 1958) • John H. Niemeyer (president from 1958) • May Aldrich (secretary) • Julian M. Gerard (treasurer)
- Formerly called: National Association for the Promotion of Kindergarten Education (1909–1911)

The National Kindergarten Association (NKA) was a philanthropic organization, based in the United States, which promoted universal acceptance of the public-school kindergarten. It existed between 1909 and 1976, and its headquarters was in New York City. The association was founded to "promote the establishment of kindergartens throughout the United States for the purpose of promoting the physical, moral and intellectual development" of the children in attendance.

== History ==
Founded by Bessie Locke in 1909, initially as the National Association for the Promotion of Kindergarten Education, the NKA functioned on the local, state and national levels. The company was initially based in New York City's brand-new Metropolitan Life Insurance Company Tower, located at 1 Madison Avenue in Manhattan, but later moved one mile north to 8 West 40th Street, on the southern side of Bryant Park.

The association once received a $250,000 donation from oil executive John Dustin Archbold. Archbold's wife, Annie Eliza Mills, was elected to the association's board of directors in 1911. In 1912, National Kindergarten and Elementary College (now National Louis University) became affiliated with the NKA. From 1913 to 1919, the NKA worked with the United States Bureau of Education to promote kindergarten. In an attempt to raise awareness in areas where no kindergartens existed, the NKA published education materials and distributed them nationwide between 1917 and 1954.

In 1920, Talks to Mothers: Reading Aloud to the Child was published, a collaboration between Lucy Wheelock, NKA and the Bureau of Education. By late 1927, the association reported that 206 kindergartens had opened across the United States over the course of the year, bringing the total up to 942. Those kindergartens had 356,000 children in their care. There were, however, still four million children without access to a kindergarten. In the 1930s and 1940s, the NKA lobbied in Washington, D.C., for a permanent form of federal aid for kindergartens.

The organization was affiliated with the General Federation of Women's Clubs and the National Congress of Mothers (which became the PTA), and its field secretaries in each state worked with the women's clubs to inform the public about the kindergarten's importance and to promote improved state legislation relating to kindergartens.

In the association's 25th anniversary year, it had brought about the opening of almost two thousand kindergartens in total across the United States, bringing kindergarten classes to around 628,000 children.

"More than 100 towns in the United States have closed their kindergartens with the thought of saving money. The big task still before the National Kindergarten Association is to disseminate sufficient knowledge to make such irreparable mistakes impossible."

— Bessie Locke, 1934

By 1952, the totals had increased to over 3,200 kindergartens and 1.6 million children. Bessie Locke died on April 9, 1952, aged 86. In 1957, the NKA published About Kindergarten as part of its promotion for community programming. The following year, John H. Niemeyer, president of the Bank Street College of Education, became the NKA president, succeeding Dr. Howard Richard Best, who died on August 6, aged 63. The National Kindergarten Association dissolved in 1976.
