= National Louis University =

Private university in Chicago, Illinois

Coordinates: 41°52′49″N 87°37′29″W

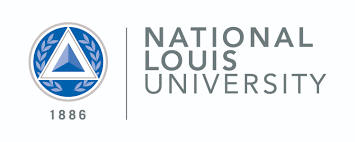
- Motto: Sapientia Dignitas Temperantia
- Motto in English: Wisdom Dignity Judgement
- Type: Private university
- Established: 1886; 140 years ago
- Endowment: $88.7 million (2025)
- President: Eddie Phillips
- Faculty: 198 full-time and 459 part-time (fall 2023)
- Students: 8,270 (fall 2023)
- Undergraduates: 4,239 (fall 2023)
- Postgraduates: 4,031 (fall 2023)
- Location: Chicago, Illinois, United States
- Colors: Grey Blue
- Website: nl.edu

National Louis University (NLU) is a private university with its main campus in Chicago, Illinois, United States. NLU enrolls undergraduate and graduate students in more than 60 programs across its four colleges. It has locations throughout the Chicago metropolitan area as well as a regional campus in Tampa, Florida, where it serves students from 13 counties in that state's central region.

Since its founding in 1886, NLU has played a historic role in the education sector. Its founders helped start the National Kindergarten Movement, helped inaugurate the National Parent Teacher Association (PTA), and promoted the importance of academic and professional training in early childhood education theory and practice.

NLU alumni have served in Illinois state government and received multiple James Beard awards; 76 alumni from its National College of Education have received honorary recognition by the Golden Apple Foundations of Chicago and Rockford.

== History ==
National Louis University (NLU) began in 1886, when Elizabeth Harrison founded the school to train "Kindergarteners", young women teachers who began the early childhood education movement. NLU's founders helped start the National Kindergarten Movement, helped inaugurate the National Parent Teacher Association (PTA), and promoted the importance of academic and professional training in early childhood education theory and practice. The school's requirements became a model for education colleges nationwide. In 1893, the university published Harrison's book, The Kindergarten as an Influence in Modern Civilization, in which she explained, "how to teach the child from the beginning of his existence that all things are connected [and] how to lead him to this vital truth from his own observation".

1917

As it evolved and grew over time, eventually the university's name was changed to the Chicago Kindergarten Training School (1887), Chicago Kindergarten College (1893), the National Kindergarten and Elementary College (1912) and then the National College of Education (1930). The "National" part of the university's name came about when the school became the professional school of the National Kindergarten Association. The university championed the concept of kindergarten and early education teaching in America and was one of the first teachers' colleges in the country to offer a four-year program culminating in the bachelor of education degree.

Over the first quarter of the twentieth century, as it continued to grow and a new generation of leadership emerged, the college would relocate a number of times: in 1913 the National Kindergarten and Elementary College campus moved to 2944 South Michigan Avenue; in 1918 Edna Dean Baker succeeded Harrison to become the second president of the college; and the college moved to Evanston, Illinois, in 1926.

In the 1920s, the university partnered with Nobel Peace Prize recipient Jane Addams to provide educational opportunities to the largely poor, immigrant population served by Hull House. In 1954, the university's graduate school was accredited to offer masters and doctorate level degrees. The university organized its general liberal arts offerings into the College of Arts and Sciences in 1982, and began its business and management school in 1989, offering both bachelors and master of business administration degrees.

In 1990, National Louis united the name of National College of Education with that of trustee and benefactor Michael W. Louis, the son of Henrietta Johnson Louis. Louis’ significant gift spearheaded the transition from college to university and enabled the university to greatly expand its programs. NLU encompassed three colleges — National College of Education, the College of Arts and Sciences and the College of Management and Business. It offered 60 academic programs, with degrees extending to the doctoral level. In 1999, the historic 22-story Peoples Gas Building at 122 S. Michigan Avenue in Chicago's Downtown, built in 1910, became the flagship location of NLU. Designed by Daniel Burnham, the university's new home housed faculty and administrative offices, a library, classrooms and computer labs.

In 2006, the university closed its former main site, which had 6.5 acres (2.6 ha) of land, with about 66% in the Village of Wilmette and the remainder in Evanston. This site was replaced by its location in Skokie (closed in 2021).

In 2013, National Louis University was censured by the American Association of University Professors for eliminating faculty positions and academic programs during a budget crisis. In response, National Louis President Nivine Megahed called the vote “unfortunate,” but said she was convinced of the necessity of her actions to ensure the long-term viability of the institution.

The College of Arts and Sciences and the College of Management and Business were combined in 2014 into the College of Professional Studies and Advancement, with the programs organized in the School of Health and Human Services, the School of Social and Behavioral Sciences, and the School of Business and Management. In 2018, National Louis University acquired the assets of Kendall College for $1, transferring its programs in general education, early childhood education, business, hospitality management, culinary arts, and baking & pastry, and building out entirely new facilities for the school in a newly acquired space at 18 S. Michigan Ave. In the summer of 2019, NLU took on the former students and hired former professors from now-defunct Argosy University, a for-profit institution that was abruptly forced to close due to the discontinuation of federal financial aid. The Argosy students were left without a way to continue their education until the possibility arose for them to transfer to NLU, which allowed them to pick up where they left off with the same classmates and professors. This also included the Illinois School of Professional Psychology's doctoral students in Clinical Psychology, who were able to complete their graduate degrees at NLU.

In 2015, NLU founded its Harrison Professional Pathways Program, an entirely new undergraduate degree program aimed at serving under-resourced but college-qualified youth in the Chicago area, specifically students graduating high school with a GPA between 2.0 and 3.0. To help students who may not be fully prepared for college, Pathways implements adaptive learning technology, Student Success Coaches, and flipped classroom environments to personalize instruction for each student. Since its founding, the Pathways program has grown in enrollment from an inaugural class of 85 students to over 1,500 in five years.

== Academics ==
The university consists of seven distinct colleges: The College of Psychology and Behavioral Sciences (CPBS), Kendall College of Culinary Arts and Hospitality Management, The National College of Education (NCE), the School of Business, and The Undergraduate College (UGC).

The Undergraduate College at National Louis University is dedicated to supporting underserved but college-qualified high school graduates in receiving an education at a reduced tuition rate. These students are able to choose between any of the university's undergraduate degree options. In order to make classes accessible, classes are taught in many modes including face-to-face, hybrid, and online.

NLU's National College of Education (NCE) is the oldest school in the university and is where students can study in its distinguished undergraduate and graduate programs in the three broad areas of Teacher Preparation, Educational Leadership, and Educator Advancement and Specialization.

CPSA consists of the school of health and human services, school of social and behavioral sciences, and school of business and management. Students may pursue a Psy.D. in Clinical Psychology, study in NLU's Community Psychology program, or enter the field of Health and Human Services at the Bachelor's, Master's, or Ed.D. levels.

The School of Business was designed to help students launch their business career or take it to the next level at the Master's or Doctoral levels.

Kendall College at National Louis University offers preparation for careers in Culinary Arts, Baking and Pastry, and Hospitality management. Kendall College combines a blend of traditional academic instruction with on-site, practical experience that aims to maximally prepare its students to transition smoothly into their chosen careers. Kendall College at NLU moved into brand new facilities on Michigan Avenue in downtown Chicago in the summer of 2020.

National Louis University offers the Professional Assistance Center for Education (P.A.C.E.) program which is three-year, post-secondary program designed to meet the transitional needs for young adults with multiple intellectual, learning, and developmental disabilities. Some of the services they provide are employment preparation, independent living skills, and social development.

In October 2014, National Louis University signed a 3+1 bachelor's degree program in the field of Human Services with College of DuPage. The program allows students to complete their four-year program at the College of DuPage campus with NLU faculty. Students can work on an Associates of Applied Science Human Services Generalist or an Associates of Applied Science in Addictions Counseling during their four-year plan.

=== Rankings ===
Academic rankings

National
- U.S. News & World Report: 293–381
- Washington Monthly: 31

In 2019, U.S. News & World Report ranked National Louis No. 195–258 in Best Education Schools and 328 in Top Performers on Social Mobility.

In 2022, Washington Monthly ranked National Louis #18 among national universities, one spot below University of Illinois Urbana-Champaign and one spot above University of Washington.

== Downtown location ==
NLU - 122 S. Michigan Ave., Chicago

The university owns and occupies the second through sixth floors of the downtown Chicago Peoples Gas Building on Michigan Avenue in the Historic Michigan Boulevard District, across the street from the Art Institute of Chicago. It was in borrowed rooms in the then fledgling Art Institute (in its earlier home on Michigan Avenue at Van Buren) that the university held its first classes.

In December 2018 National Louis University purchased another building known as The Gage Building, at 18 S. Michigan Ave. Construction began in 2019 to create the new home of Kendall College's culinary arts and hospitality management programs.

== Notable alumni ==
- Asheru, hip-hop musician
- Greg Baxtrom, American chef
- Angela Brown-Burke (2015), Jamaican politician, Member of Parliament MP, Former Mayor of Kingston & St. Andrew, Former Senator
- Harriet Frances Carpenter, educator and writer
- Judy Erwin, Illinois State Representative
- Linda Holmes, Illinois State Senator
- LaVon Mercer (born 1959), American-Israeli basketball player
- Glenford Eckleton Mitchell, Jamaican member of the Universal House of Justice, the supreme governing body of the Baháʼí Faith
- Betty Reed, member of the Florida House of Representatives
- Sue Sinclair, (1932–2020), educator and championship sailor
- Brandt Smith, member of the Arkansas House of Representatives since 2015
- David J. Steiner (1965–2016) documentary filmmaker, educator, writer, rabbi, and political activist
- Lamont Robinson, Illinois House of Representatives
- Mary Traffarn Whitney (1852–1942), minister, editor, social reformer, philanthropist, lecturer

== In popular culture ==
The second season of the FX television series "The Bear" (2023) featured the Kendall College at NLU. Ebraheim and Tina, two of the series's characters enroll into culinary classes at Kendall to further their careers while getting ready to turn their restaurant into a fine dining establishment. Mike Salzinski, a chef- instructor at Kendall college, made a brief appearance as an instructor during the classroom sequence that were filmed at the college's campus at 18 South Michigan Avenue in Chicago.

== See also ==
- Wyższa Szkoła Biznesu – National-Louis University
