= Greg Baxtrom =

American chef

Greg Baxtrom is the chef-owner of restaurants Olmsted, Five Acres, Patti Ann’s and Petite Patate. Prior to opening Olmsted in 2016, Baxtrom worked at restaurants including Alinea, Blue Hill at Stone Barns, Per Se and Lysverket in Norway.

== Early life and education ==
Baxtrom was born in Chicago, Illinois, United States, and graduated from Kendall College.

== Career ==
Baxtrom opened his first restaurant, Olmsted, in 2016. The 50-seat restaurant showcases a seasonal and creative vegetable-forward menu that highlights produce from the lush backyard garden, as well as local farmers and purveyors. The restaurant has been awarded one of Esquire's Best New Restaurants in America; Bon Appetit's 50 Best New Restaurants in America; Food & Wine's 2017 Restaurant of the Year; The New York Times "10 Best Restaurants in 2016"; among others.

Patti Ann’s is the neighborhood restaurant in Prospect Heights from acclaimed chef Greg Baxtrom that opened in March 2022. Named after Greg's mom, Patti Ann’s features a menu of dishes inspired by some of Greg’s favorite dishes from his Midwestern upbringing including Bloomin’ Onion, Chips N’ Goop, and Baked Mostaccioli, always prepared with seasonal produce from the Greenmarket— a staple of Greg’s signature cooking style. Patti Ann’s recently debuted a menu of Chicago tavern-style pizzas, known for their crispy and crunchy thin crust. Patti Ann’s Bakery is open daily, serving freshly baked breads and pastries and selling goods from local purveyors.

== Awards and reception ==
His restaurant has received positive reviews, including in the “Top New York Restaurants in 2016” from The New York Times, “Restaurant of the Year” from Eater in 2016, “Restaurant of the Year” from Food & Wine in 2017, “America’s Best New Restaurant” from Bon Appétit in 2017, “Best New Restaurant in America” from Esquire in 2017, and “Where to Eat in 2017” from New York Magazine. Olmsted has also appeared on Best-of-the-Year lists in publications such as The New Yorker, Forbes, and Conde Nast Traveler, among many others.

Olmsted was a finalist for the James Beard Foundation Award for Best New Restaurant in 2017. Baxtrom was a semi-finalist for the James Beard Foundation Award for Best Chef: New York City in 2018.

In 2017, Baxtrom received the StarChefs Award for New York City Rising Star Chef.
