= John H. Niemeyer =

John Harry Niemeyer

2nd President of Bank Street College of Education
- In office 1956–1973
- Preceded by: Lucy Sprague Mitchell
- Succeeded by: Francis J. Roberts

Personal details
- Born: John H. Niemeyer; May 23, 1908 Scranton, Pennsylvania, U.S.
- Died: April 19, 2004 (aged 95) Florida Keys, Florida, U.S.
- Profession: Educator, consultant, university president

John Harry Niemeyer (May 23, 1908 – April 19, 2004) was the second president of Bank Street College of Education and a leading educator and consultant to the United States Office of Education. The college currently hosts the Niemeyer Series in his memory, which comprises lectures and symposia that address current issues in the education community.

Niemeyer also became president of the National Kindergarten Association in 1958.

== Education ==
At age 16 he was sent to Staunton Military Academy in Virginia.

In 1930, Niemeyer graduated Phi Beta Kappa from Hamilton College in New York. He attained a master's degree in history from the University of Rochester and had completed coursework for a doctorate in education, but had to abandon this after his father suffered a cerebral hemorrhage He also received a master's degree from Teachers College, Columbia University, in 1931.

== Career ==
Upon graduation, Niemeyer taught at Harley School in Rochester, New York, before becoming headmaster at Oak Lane Country School in Philadelphia.

=== Bank Street College of Education presidency ===
During his seventeen years in office, Niemeyer oversaw the college's 1970 move from 69 Bank Street in Greenwich Village to its current location on West 112th Street in Morningside Heights. Additionally, Bank Street's rapid growth since its 1950 genesis—before 1950, the college did not give Master of Science degrees—brought the institution to the attention of the federal government. As the Civil Rights Act of 1964 reached its final stages before enactment, the United States Commissioner of Education asked Niemeyer to work closely with southern universities to create standards for desegregation programs. Bank Street faculty were also asked to help create the national Head Start Program and to shape regulations for Title IV of the Voting Rights Act of 1965.

Niemeyer led the college through a national workshop for Head Start administrators and directed the establishment of Bank Street's 42nd Street Early Childhood Model Head Start Training Center.

Niemeyer's presidency is widely credited with Bank Street's evolution into an influential resource in the field of the education. The 1960s saw the development of Bank Street's Research Division and the Educational Resources Center, an initiative to aid in the education of students limited by segregation and or poverty. Niemeyer administered the publishing of the Bank Street Readers, the first multiracial, topical education readers in the country. Under Niemeyer, the college also became a sponsor of Project Follow Through, helping to design its programming and to disseminate the Bank Street method to numerous United States schools.

Niemeyer received an honorary doctorate from the college in 1990.

=== Author ===
In 1998, Niemeyer had published Rights & Responsibilities: My Years at Bank Street. It was released to coincide with his 90th birthday.

== Personal life ==
Niemeyer was born on May 23, 1908, in Scranton, Pennsylvania, to Harry and Mary Belle, who were of German ancestry. He was their second child, after Jason.

Niemeyer was married, firstly, to Marjorie Albertson from 1934. They had one child, daughter Nancy Niemeyer Rovin (1938–2019).

He later married Rose Bello Niemeyer, who died four months after her husband.

Niemeyer died on April 19, 2004, aged 95.
