= Kendall College =

Culinary arts college in Chicago, Illinois, US

Kendall College at National Louis University
- Type: Private college
- Established: 1934
- Parent institution: National Louis University
- President: Nivine Megahed
- Location: Chicago, Illinois, United States
- Campus: Metropolitan
- Website: www.kendall.edu

Kendall College at National Louis University is a culinary arts and hospitality management college of National Louis University, a private university in Chicago, Illinois. It was founded in 1934 as an independent college and later became a subsidiary of Laureate Education, Inc. On August 6, 2018, National Louis University received approval from the Higher Learning Commission and the U.S. Department of Education to transfer Kendall College's programs and other assets from Laureate Education to the university.

== History ==
In 1934, two seminarians endorsed by the Scandinavian Conference of the Methodist Church — one Swedish, the other Danish-Norwegian — formed Evanston Collegiate Institute in Evanston, Illinois. Many early students found employment at the Washington National Insurance Company of Evanston, a major financial supporter of the school.

In 1950, the school was renamed in honor of Washington National's founders, Curtis P. Kendall and his family.

Business programs at Kendall College began in the 1970s. The School of Business was created in 2007. In 1985, the School of Culinary Arts was established. Building on the culinary program, a Bachelor of Arts in Hotel and Restaurant Management was created in 1987. In 2005, the program was revised into a Bachelor of Arts in Hospitality Management. A partnership was later formed with Les Roches International School of Hotel Management and Glion Institute of Higher Education, including the creation of exchange programs with Les Roches campuses in Switzerland and Spain.

In 2005, Kendall College moved from Evanston to Goose Island, Chicago, in the former Sara Lee Research and Development building. In 2008, Kendall College was acquired by Laureate Education. In 2018, Kendall College and its programs were transferred to National Louis University.

== Accreditation ==
Kendall College is accredited by the Higher Learning Commission and is a member of the Culinary Arts Associate and Baking and Pastry Associate programs are accredited by the American Culinary Federation Education Foundation Accrediting Commission.

== Notable alumni ==
- Chef Greg Baxtrom
- Chef Jose Garces
- Chef Beverly Kim
- Chef Doug Sohn
- Chef Michael White
- Chef Deniz Orhun
