= Garrisonville, Virginia =

Garrisonville
- Unincorporated community
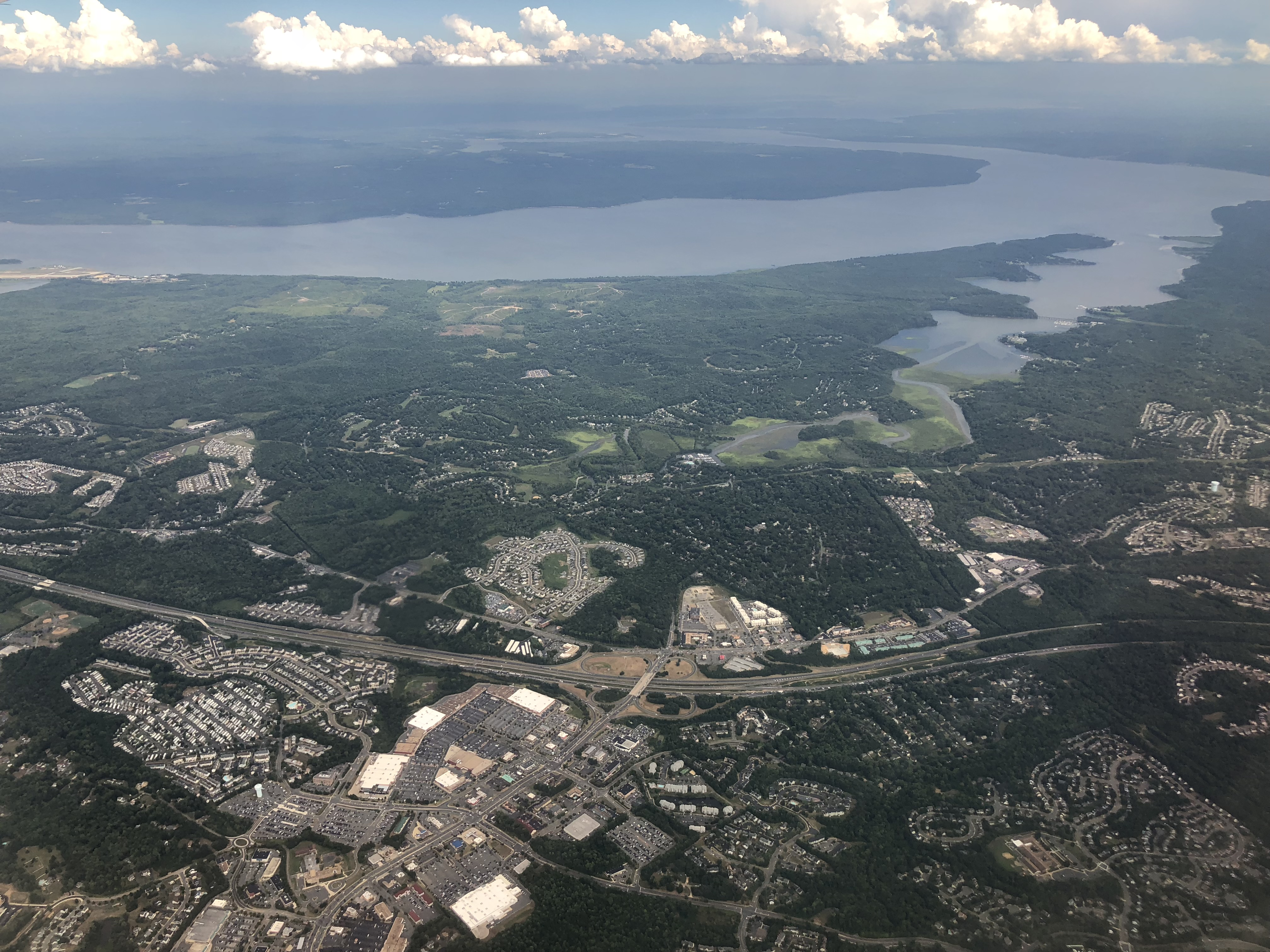
- Aerial view of Garrisonville (foreground) and Aquia Harbour (center) with Aquia Creek and the Potomac River in the background

- Location within the state of Virginia Garrisonville (Virginia) Garrisonville (the United States)
- Coordinates: 38°28′57″N 77°25′36″W
- Country: United States
- State: Virginia
- County: Stafford
- Elevation: 282 ft (86 m)
- Time zone: UTC−5 (Eastern (EST))
  - Summer (DST): UTC−4 (EDT)
- ZIP code: 22463
- GNIS feature ID: 1499463

Garrisonville is an unincorporated community in Stafford County, Virginia, United States.

== History ==
The Garrison family settled here around 1715. By the early twentieth century, Garrisonville featured several stores, a post office, blacksmith’s shop, and a village hall called "Garrisonville Hall". The Austin Run Pyrite Mine operated near Garrisonville from 1906 to 1918, providing employment to local men. In 1942, business activity in Garrisonville improved following the expansion of the nearby Marine Corps base.

== Geography ==
Approximately 40 miles (64 km) southwest of Washington, D.C. and 15 miles (24 km) north of Fredericksburg, it is a suburbanized bedroom community for Washington, D.C. Marine Corps Base Quantico is north of Garrisonville.

== Infrastructure ==
Garrisonville is served by State Route 610 (Garrisonville Road), which passes east—west through the community, and Interstate 95 and U.S. Route 1, which run north—south to the east.
