= National Register of Historic Places listings in Stafford County, Virginia =

Location of Stafford County in Virginia

This is a list of the National Register of Historic Places listings in Stafford County, Virginia.

This is intended to be a complete list of the properties and districts on the National Register of Historic Places in Stafford County, Virginia, United States. The locations of National Register properties and districts for which the latitude and longitude coordinates are included below, may be seen in an online map.

There are 21 properties and districts listed on the National Register in the county, including 3 National Historic Landmarks.

This National Park Service list is complete through NPS recent listings posted December 12, 2025.

== Current listings ==
	Name on the Register	Image	Date listed	Location	City or town	Description
1	Accokeek Furnace Archeological Site (44ST53)		May 15, 1984 (#84003598)	Address Restricted	Stafford	
16	Advanced Courthouse Road Redoubt	Advanced Courthouse Road Redoubt	February 14, 2006 (#06000051)	Old Fort Lane; 38°23′36″N 77°21′21″W	Stafford	
2	Aquia Church	Aquia Church	November 12, 1969 (#69000282)	North of the junction of U.S. Route 1 and Garrisonville Rd. 38°27′53″N 77°24′11″W	Garrisonville	
3	Belmont	Belmont	October 15, 1966 (#66000848)	Off U.S. Route 1; 38°19′26″N 77°28′23″W	Falmouth	Also known as Gari Melchers Home
4	Bethlehem Primitive Baptist Church Cemetery	Bethlehem Primitive Baptist Church Cemetery	June 21, 2018 (#100002206)	135 Chapel Green Rd. 38°17′37″N 77°21′25″W	Fredericksburg	
5	Carlton	Carlton	October 3, 1973 (#73002064)	501 Melchers Dr. 38°19′32″N 77°28′14″W	Falmouth	
6	Clearview	Clearview	February 24, 1975 (#75002039)	Off Telegraph Rd. near U.S. Route 1 and Butler Rd. 38°19′25″N 77°27′49″W	Falmouth	
7	Conway House	Conway House	March 8, 2004 (#04000162)	305 King St. 38°19′19″N 77°28′07″W	Falmouth	
8	Falmouth Historic District	Falmouth Historic District	February 26, 1970 (#70000825)	Junction of U.S. Routes 1 and 17; 38°19′28″N 77°28′00″W	Falmouth	
9	Ferry Farm Site	Ferry Farm Site	May 5, 1972 (#72001417)	East of Fredericksburg at 712 Kings Highway; 38°17′36″N 77°26′55″W	Fredericksburg	Same as George Washington Boyhood Home Site
10	Hartwood Manor	Hartwood Manor	February 1, 2006 (#05001618)	335 Hartwood Rd. 38°25′15″N 77°34′26″W	Hartwood	
11	Hartwood Presbyterian Church	Hartwood Presbyterian Church	November 13, 1989 (#89001929)	Junction of Hartwood and Hartwood Church Rds. 38°24′07″N 77°34′01″W	Hartwood	
12	Hunter's Ironworks	Hunter's Ironworks	January 18, 1974 (#74002147)	West of Falmouth off U.S. Route 17; 38°19′27″N 77°29′14″W	Falmouth	
13	Quantico Marine Corps Base Historic District	Quantico Marine Corps Base Historic District	March 26, 2001 (#01000260)	Marine Corps Base Quantico; 38°30′08″N 77°18′21″W	Quantico	Extends into Prince William County
14	Potomac Creek Site	Potomac Creek Site	December 3, 1969 (#69000281)	Indian Point Rd. 38°21′06″N 77°17′53″W	Brooke	
15	Public Quarry at Government Island	Public Quarry at Government Island	May 30, 2007 (#03000457)	Address Restricted; 38°26′54″N 77°23′00″W	Stafford	
17	Stafford Training School	Stafford Training School	February 5, 2013 (#12001272)	1739 U.S. Route 1; 38°24′16″N 77°25′12″W	Stafford	
18	Tennessee Camp		November 12, 2008 (#08001059)	Civil War and Hill trails 38°29′45″N 77°19′52″W	Marine Corps Base Quantico	
19	Union Church and Cemetery	Union Church and Cemetery	September 10, 2008 (#08000896)	Carter St. and Butler Rd. 38°19′23″N 77°27′56″W	Falmouth	
20	George Washington Boyhood Home Site	George Washington Boyhood Home Site	February 16, 2000 (#00000259)	237 King's Highway; 38°17′38″N 77°26′53″W	Fredericksburg	
21	White Oak Church	White Oak Church	January 3, 1991 (#90002112)	8 Caisson Rd. 38°18′01″N 77°22′32″W	Falmouth	

== See also ==
- List of National Historic Landmarks in Virginia
- National Register of Historic Places listings in Virginia
- National Register of Historic Places listings in Fredericksburg, Virginia
