= Corinne Melchers =

American painter, humanitarian, and gardener

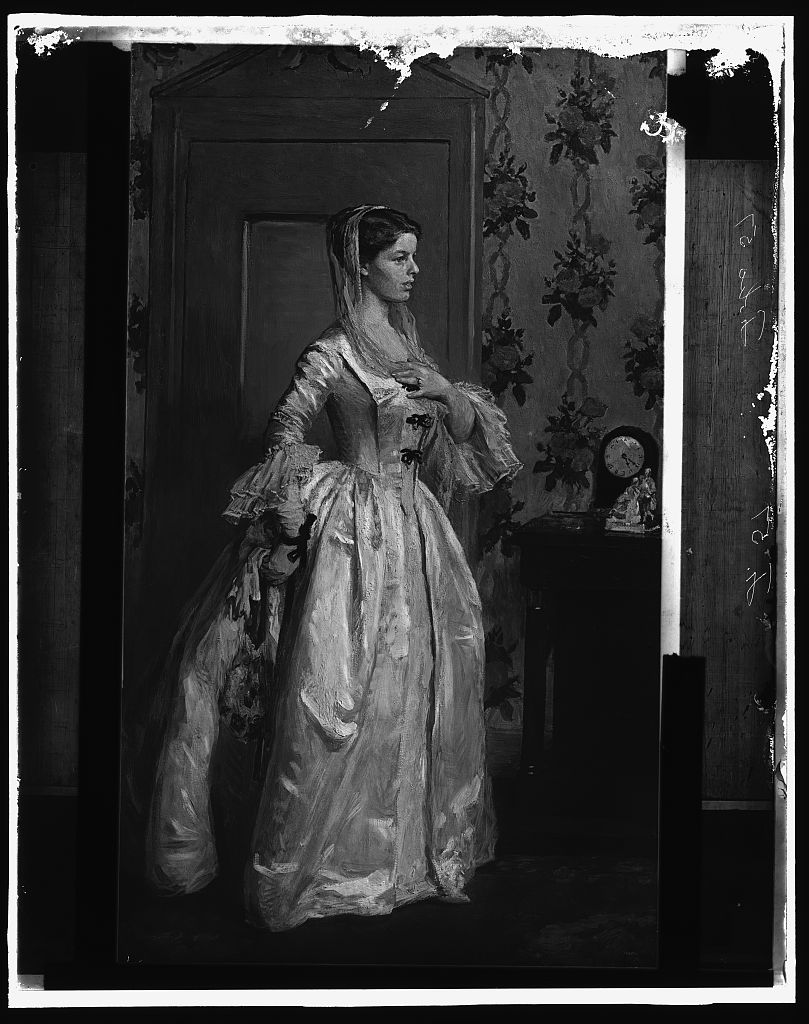
- Born: Corinne Lawton Mackall; February 27, 1880; Baltimore, Maryland, US
- Died: April 7, 1955 (aged 75); Falmouth, Virginia, US
- Education: Maryland Institute Practical School for the Mechanic Arts; Académie Colarossi
- Occupations: Painter, humanitarian, gardener
- Spouse: Gari Melchers (m. 1903; died 1932)
- Relatives: Leonard Mackall (brother); Alexander Lawton (grandfather); Robert McGill Mackall (cousin)

Corinne Lawton Mackall Melchers (February 27, 1880 – April 7, 1955) was an American painter, humanitarian, and gardener. She was the wife of painter Gari Melchers and maintained their Belmont estate after his death. As a gardener and rosarian, Melchers was an early supporter of the Historic Garden Week and was heavily involved with the restoration of the grounds of the Kenmore plantation. She led humanitarian efforts during World War I and World War II. Melchers initiated the creation of the Stafford County Health Association and the hiring of the first Stafford County nurse. Melchers helped establish the Mary Washington Hospital and the Virginia Museum of Fine Arts. She served on the Virginia Commission for the Arts.

== Early life and education ==
Corinne Lawton Mackall was born into a prominent Baltimore family on February 27, 1880. Her father, Leonard Covington Mackall, was a sugar industry businessperson, her mother, Louise Lawton, was the daughter of Alexander Lawton, a lawyer and confederate veteran who served as the Quartermaster-General, and her brother was historian Leonard Mackall. Mackall's father died in a horse and buggy accident in 1890. Her mother raised Mackall and her two brothers. Her maternal grandfather was pardoned for his role in the Confederate States Army and was appointed ambassador to the Austrian court of Franz Joseph I of Austria. Mackall's family traveled to Europe frequently to visit her grandparents.

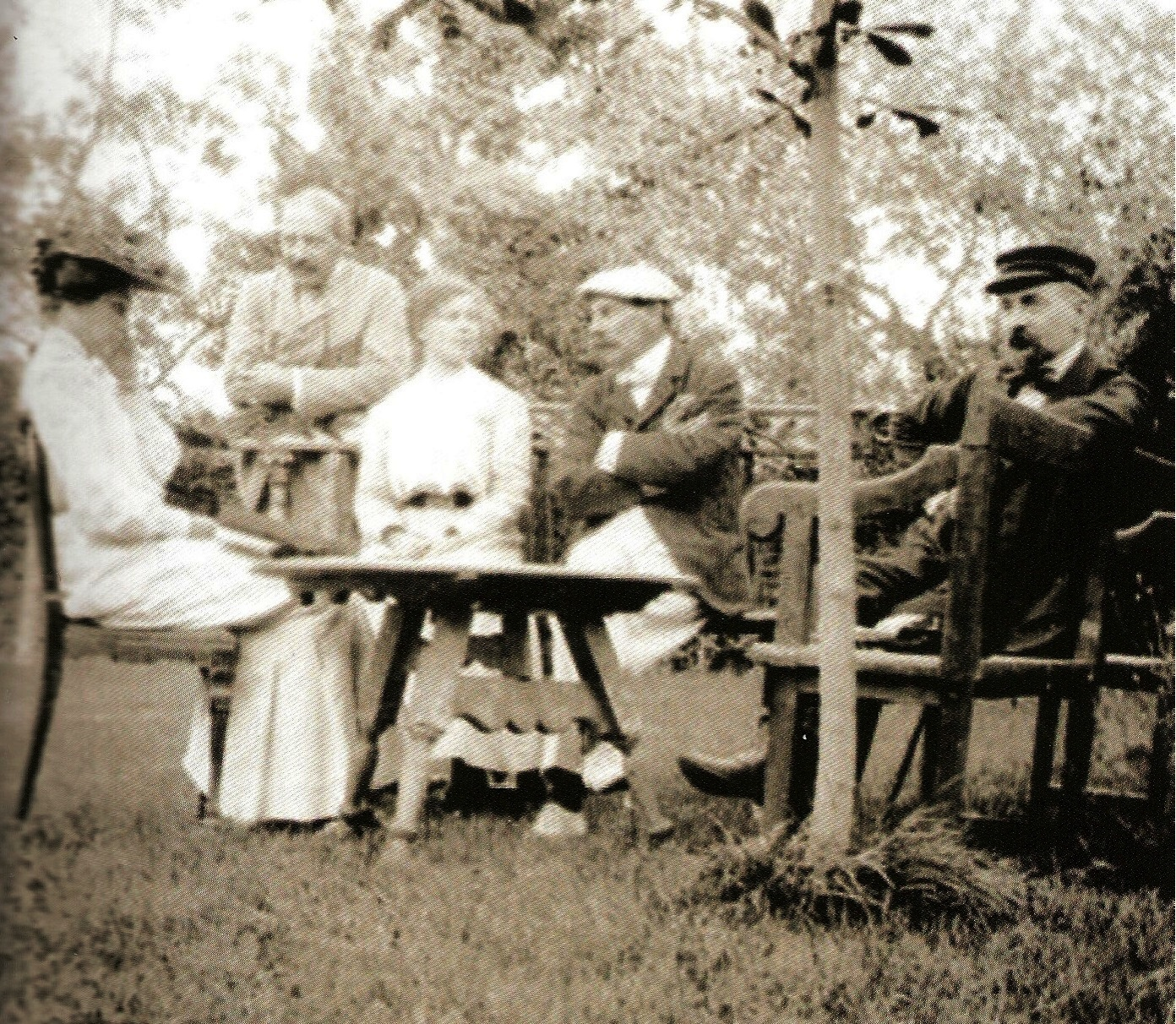
The Egmondse School (l.t.r.) Henriette Hitchcock, (unknown), Corinne Melchers, George Hitchcock, and Gari Melchers. Archives, Gari Melchers Home and Studio.

Mackall attended a boarding school in Connecticut. By 1902, Mackall opened a studio on North Charles Street and enrolled in courses at the Maryland Institute Practical School for the Mechanic Arts. During her schooling, she travelled to Europe with her mother and younger brother. In April 1902, while aboard the S.S. Aller, she met painter Gari Melchers who encouraged her to study at his art colony, Egmondse School, in Egmond aan Zee. She later studied at the Académie Colarossi in the fall of 1902.

== Career ==
=== Art ===
After a quick courtship, Mackall and Melchers married on December 31, 1902, and exchanged vows at an Anglican church in Jersey on April 14, 1903. The couple lived in Egmond aan Zee until 1909. They moved to Weimar from 1909 to 1915 for her husband's teaching position at the Weimar Academy. In 1915, the couple returned to the United States in 1915 due to World War I. After a short time in Detroit and New York City, they settled in Falmouth, Virginia, where they restored the Belmont Estate, later known as the Gari Melchers Home & Studio. Their home featured their paintings along with works of their friends and family including Melchers' cousin Robert McGill Mackall.

Melchers and her husband established The Artist's Fellowship, a nonprofit organization in New York City and the Virginia Museum of Fine Arts. In 1933, after the death of her husband, she took his place on the Virginia Commission for the Arts until 1941.

=== Gardening ===
Melchers was a gardener and rosarian. She was involved with the Garden Club of Virginia and an early supporter of Historic Garden Week. Melchers hosted her first public garden tour in 1933. She was a founding member of the Rappahannock Valley Garden club and heavily involved in the restoration of the gardens at the Kenmore plantation.

=== Humanitarianism ===
Melchers was recognized as a humanitarian and frequently corresponded with her friends in Europe during the World War I. She sent food, money, and clothing. During World War II, Melchers fundraised for war bonds and chaired the women's division of the local War Finance Committee. She was also chief of civilian mobilization for Stafford County, Virginia. Melchers volunteered at Marine Corps Base Quantico and entertained American Red Cross personnel and military patients on base. She initiated the creation of the Stafford County Health Association and led the hiring of the first Stafford County nurse. She created a healthcare programs for poorer individuals who could not afford eyeglasses or inoculations. Melchers helped establish the Mary Washington Hospital.

== Personal life ==
Melchers was a member of the United Daughters of the Confederacy. She died on April 7, 1955. Her ashes were mixed with her husband's and added to a repository in the wall of his art studio on their Belmont estate. Melchers had no children and she bequeathed her estate to the Commonwealth of Virginia.
