= Bazil Gordon =

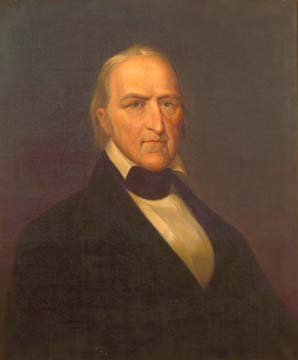

Bazil Gordon (1768 – 1847) emigrated from Scotland to America, settling in Falmouth, Virginia in 1786 where he opened a small store. Gordon grew his business, exporting large amounts of tobacco from plantations along the Rappahannock River to England. He is believed to be America's first millionaire.

== Life ==
In 1768, Bazil Gordon was born at Lochdougan, Kelton Parish, Scotland. He was the born to Samuel Gordon and Nicholas Brown, the daughter to John Brown; he was Samuel's youngest son. In circa 1783, Gordon, along with two of his brothers: Samuel and Alexander; his nephew (also called Samuel) immigrated to the "New World," America. Gordon and his kinsmen settled in Falmouth, Virginia where they opened a merchant's shop; the main commodity they traded was tobacco. This enterprise quickly became a success.

He married Anna Campbell Knox, daughter of William Knox and Susannah Stuart Fitzhugh.

The brothers' fortunes were made in large by taking advantage of the war between England and Spain, where they purchased and exported tobacco. With the fortune that Bazil Gordon made in the tobacco trade, he purchased an affluent property; Wakefield Manor, an estate located in Rappahannock County, Virginia. Wakefield Manor would be Gordon's family's main home for multiple generations. Gordon and Anne Campbell Knox would raise their three children on this property; they had two sons and one daughter. His second son, Douglas Hamilton Gordon, was born and raised in Falmouth, Virginia and graduated from the University of Virginia.

In 1847, Bazil Gordon died. At the end of his life, when he had finally finished accumulating wealth, his net worth was estimated in the millions, which, for the time, was large. By 1847, no other American had recorded a financial worth over a million dollars; it is for this reason that Gordon is believed and known for being the first millionaire in America.
