= Wellington Gordon =

American politician

Wellington Gordon (November 24, 1812 – March 21, 1888) was an American planter, politician, and educator. He inherited an estate in Virginia and served a term as a member of the Virginia General Assembly. He subsequently moved to California after the end of the American Civil War.

== Early life and political career ==
Gordon, fifth son of Samuel and Susan (Knox) Gordon, was born in Falmouth, on November 24, 1812. He entered college from Fredericksburg in 1828, and he graduated from Yale College in 1831. After graduation, he studied law and was admitted to the bar but was compelled by the failure of his eyesight to abandon his chosen profession.

Gordon then traveled for two years in Europe. On his return, having inherited a good estate from his father, he entered the life of a Virginia planter. He also interested himself in politics and served a term from 1852 to 1853, representing Fauquier County, Virginia in the Virginia General Assembly.

== Post-Civil War ==
In 1869, having been lost his fortune as a results of the American Civil War, he moved to California. He used his early education by becoming a teacher in the public schools of San Francisco.

Gordon died in that city on March 21, 1888, at age 76. He died painlessly after a six-day illness, his death the result of a rupture of a blood-vessel of the brain.

== Personal life ==
He married Frances A., daughter of the Honorable Cuthbert Powell of Loudoun County. She survived him with one son and one daughter, an elder son having died at the age of sixteen.
