= Hartwood Airport =

Hartwood Airport (closed)
- IATA: none; ICAO: none; FAA LID: 3VG7

Summary
- Airport type: Closed
- Owner: Closed
- Location: Hartwood, Virginia
- Coordinates: 38.4846°N 77.6128°W
- Interactive map of Hartwood Airport (closed)

Runways
| Direction | Length | | Surface |
| Direction | ft | m | Surface |
|---|---|---|---|
| 17/35 | 2,470 | 753 | Grass |
| 09/27 | 2,000 | 610 | Grass |

Hartwood Airport is a former airport located in Fredericksburg, Virginia, United States. It was opened in 1969, and closed in 2010.

During the time it was active, it's FAA and ICAO airport codes were 8W8.

Hartwood Airport straddles a county border with its street address in Stafford County, Virginia and its hangar, office, and most of its runway in Fauquier County, Virginia.

It was popular for private pilot training and its parachute drop zone.

It is now a "test lane" facility operated by Unisys Corp. and the U.S. Customs and Border Protection agency. It is home to a simulated international border crossing where technology akin to an E-ZPass is being evaluated for use at border crossings.
