= White Oak, Virginia =

White Oak
- Unincorporated community
- Location within the state of Virginia White Oak (Virginia) White Oak (the United States)
- Coordinates: 38°18′2″N 77°22′31″W
- Country: United States
- State: Virginia
- County: Stafford
- Time zone: UTC−5 (Eastern (EST))
  - Summer (DST): UTC−4 (EDT)

White Oak is a small agricultural unincorporated community on the Potomac River in southeastern Stafford County in the U.S. state of Virginia.

It is the hometown of Patawomeck chief Robert "Two Eagles" Green. He was an adviser to the filmmakers of The New World (2005). Green also appeared on Nova's episode "Pocahontas Revealed" as Chief Powhatan.

White Oak Church, a Primitive Baptist church listed on the National Register of Historic Places, was the site of an American Civil War encampment of the Army of the Potomac in 1862.
