= Gari Melchers =

American painter (1860–1932)

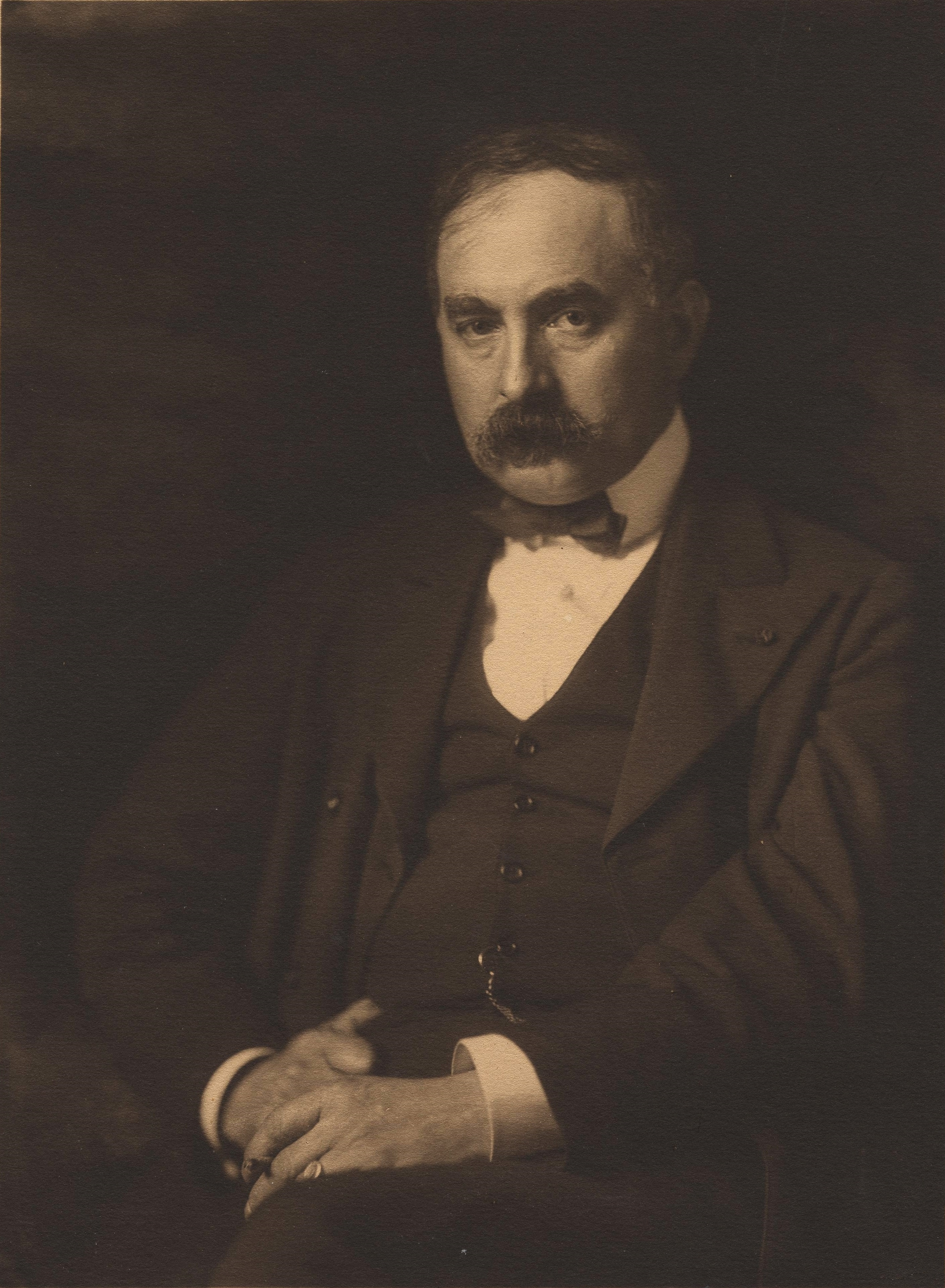
- Melchers, circa 1900
- Born: Julius Garibaldi Melchers; August 11, 1860; Detroit, Michigan, U.S.
- Died: November 30, 1932 (aged 72); Stafford County, Virginia, U.S.
- Education: Ecole des Beaux Arts, Académie Julian,
- Known for: Painting
- Spouse: Corinne Lawton Mackall (m. 1903)
- Awards: Legion of Honor

Julius Garibaldi (Gari) Melchers (August 11, 1860 – November 30, 1932) was an American artist. He was one of the leading American proponents of naturalism. He won a 1932 Gold medal from the American Academy of Arts and Letters.

== Biography ==
The son of German-born American sculptor Julius Theodore Melchers, Gari Melchers was a native of Detroit, Michigan, who at seventeen studied art at the Kunstakademie Düsseldorf under von Gebhardt and is associated with the Düsseldorf school of painting. After three years he went to Paris, where he worked at the Académie Julian, and the Ecole des Beaux Arts, where he studied under Jules Joseph Lefebvre and Gustave Boulanger. Attracted by the pictorial side of Holland, he settled at Egmond. In 1882, Melchers presented The Letter, painted the previous year in Brittany, at the Paris Salon; this first presentation by a young artist was well received. In 1884, he founded an art colony at Egmond aan Zee in the Netherlands with American artist George Hitchcock. His first important Dutch picture, The Sermon, brought him favorable attention at the Paris Salon of 1886.

He became a member of the National Academy of Design, New York; the Royal Academy of Berlin; Société Nationale des Beaux Arts, Paris; International Society of Sculptors, Painters and Gravers, London, and the Secession Society, Munich; and, besides receiving a number of medals, his decorations include the Legion of Honor, France; the order of the Red Eagle, Germany; and knight of the Order of St Michael, Bavaria. In 1889, he and John Singer Sargent became the first American painters to win a Grand Prize at the Paris Universal Exposition. His mural paintings from the World Columbian Exposition (1893) held in Chicago are now in the Library at the University of Michigan in Ann Arbor.

In 1903, he married Corinne Lawton Mackall, a Baltimore painter born in 1880, who studied at the Maryland Institute Practical School for the Mechanic Arts and at the Académie Colarossi. Mackall, sister of historian Leonard Mackall, was 20 years younger than her husband and often modeled for her husband.

In 1904, he was named an Officer in the French Legion of Honor. In 1909, he was appointed Professor of Art at the Grand Ducal Saxony School of Art in Weimar, Germany. In 1915, he returned to New York City to open a studio at Abraham Archibald Anderson's Bryant Park Studios building. From 1920 to 1928, he served as the president of the New Society of Artists. He was a member of the Virginia Fine Arts Commission and a trustee of the Corcoran Gallery of Art. He served as chairman of the Art Committee of the Smithsonian American Art Museum. He was an early member of the American Academy of Arts and Letters.

Throughout his career, whether abroad or in his commercial headquarters in New York City or his country retreat at Belmont in Falmouth, Virginia, the artist maintained a fascination with northern light.

He spent his final years at Belmont Estate in Falmouth, Virginia, near Fredericksburg. He died there on November 30, 1932.

== Works ==
Besides portraits, his chief works are: The Supper at Emmaus, in the Krupp collection at Essen; The Family, National Gallery, Berlin; Mother and Child, Luxembourg; and the decoration, at the Library of Congress, Washington, Peace and War. The artist was also commissioned by Charles Lang Freer to paint the portrait of President Theodore Roosevelt, one of the most notable public figures he painted during his prolific career.

The panels Peace and War were commissioned for the World's Columbian Exposition in Chicago of 1893.

He completed a set for three murals in 1921 for the Detroit Public Library, depicting the history of Detroit. Here's the story backstory of that project. He subsequently was commissioned to paint four murals of notable Missourians (Eugene Field, Mark Twain, Major James Rollins, and Susan Blow) for the Governor's office in the Missouri State Capitol. His work was also part of the painting event in the art competition at the 1932 Summer Olympics.

His painting Winter was stolen in Germany by the Nazis in 1933 and discovered at the Arkell Museum in Canajoharie, New York in 2019.

Gari Melchers Home & Studio holds the largest collection of Melchers’ art with 1,677 paintings and drawings. Melchers’ paintings are also in museum collections worldwide.

Selected works

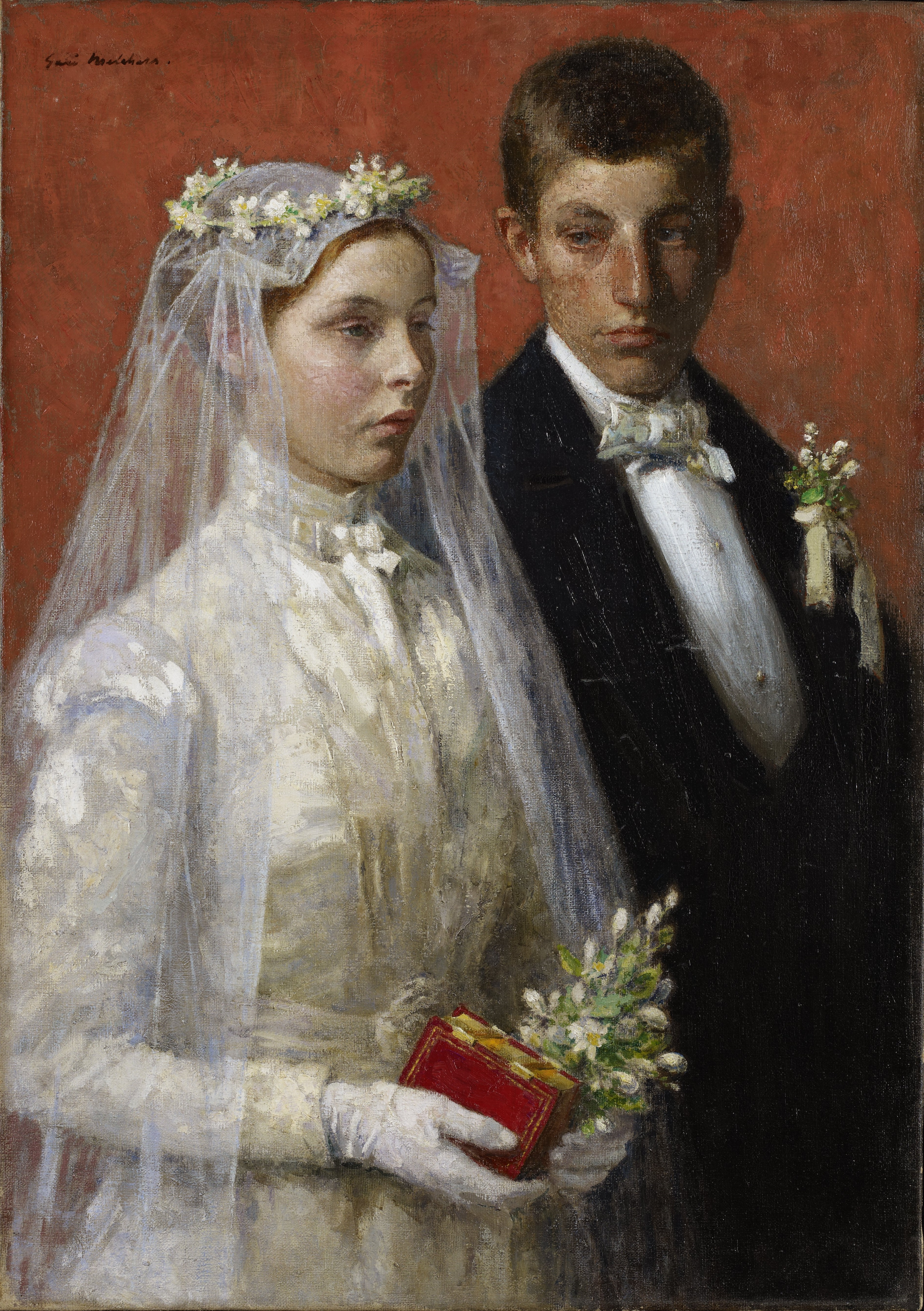
Marriage, 1893

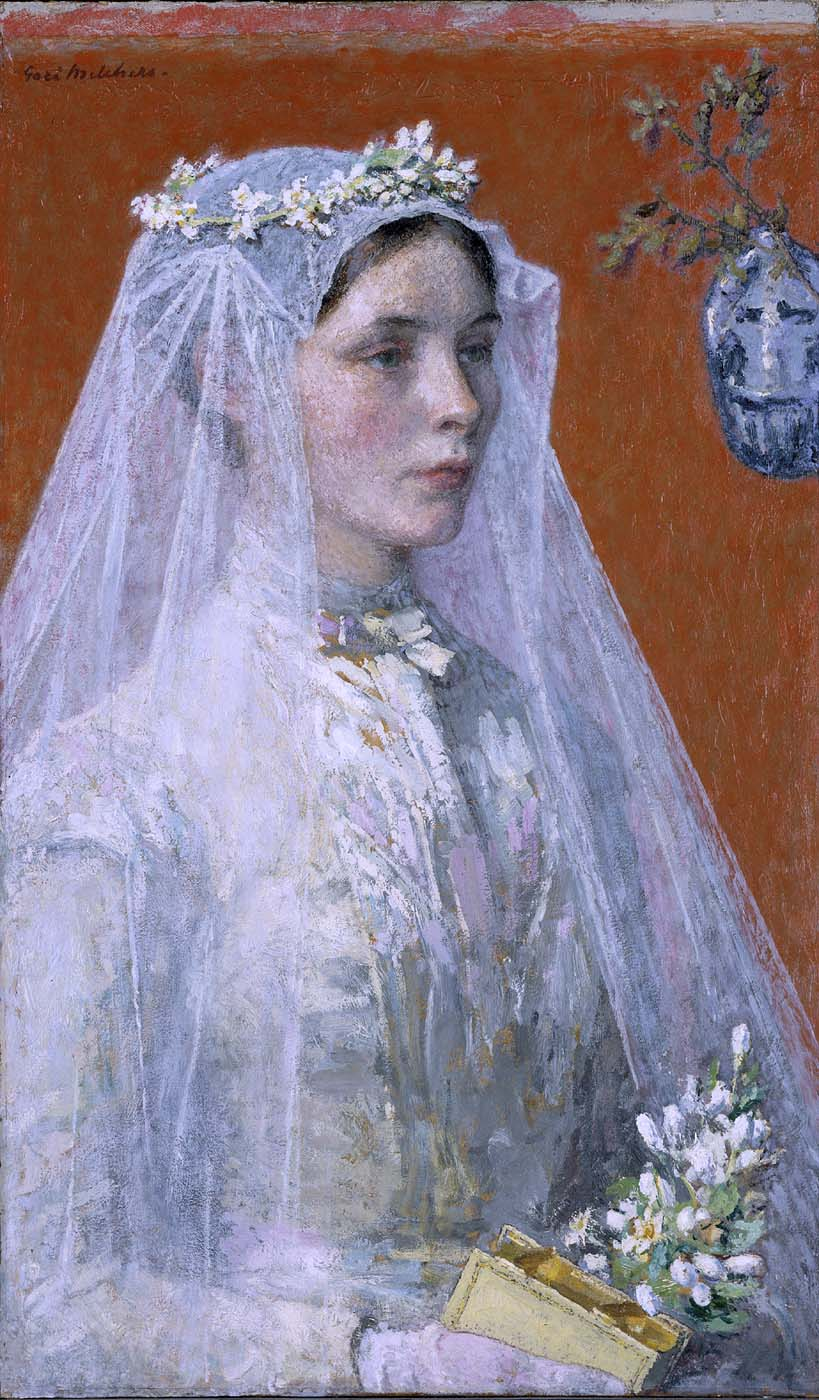
The Bride, ca. 1907

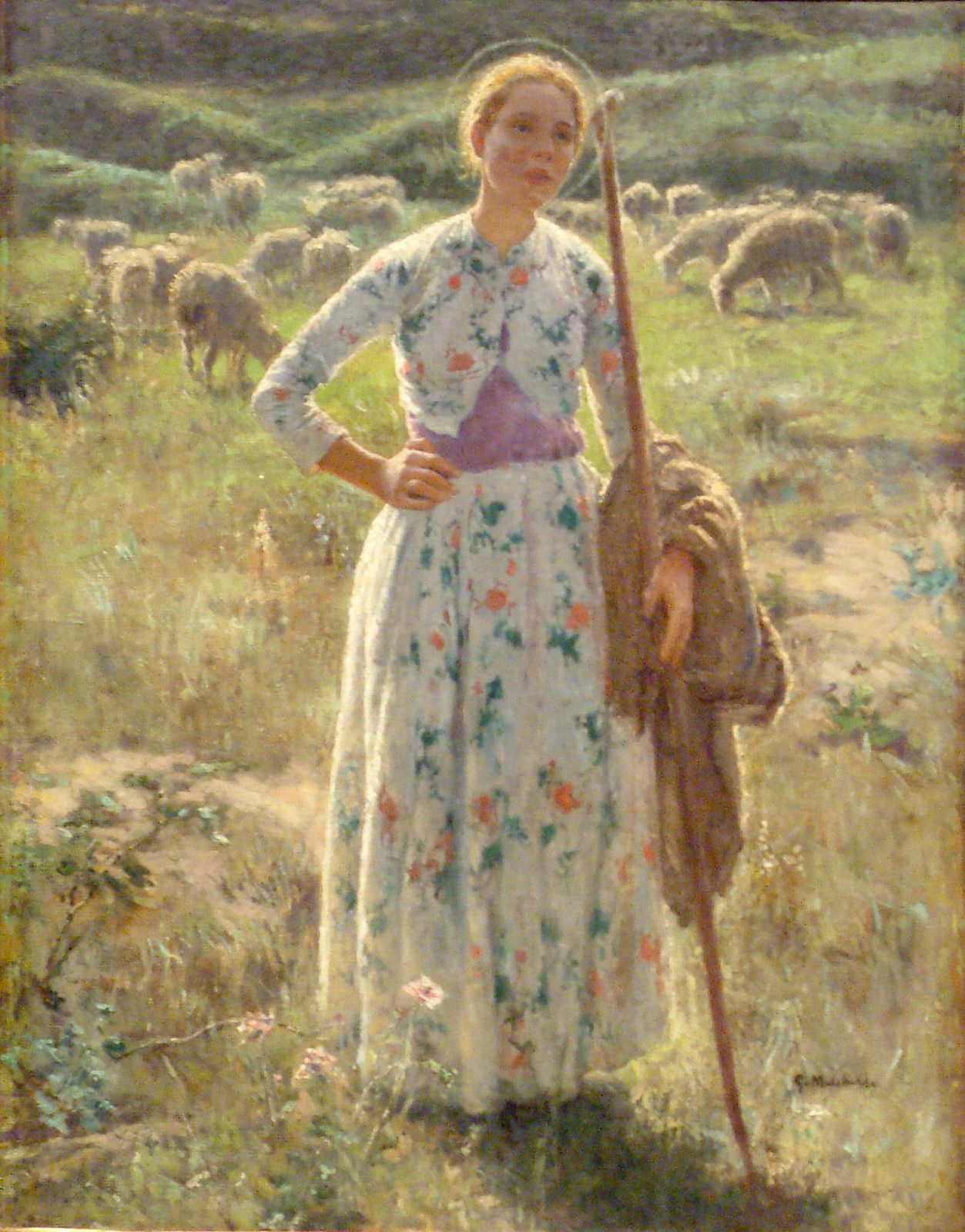
Joan of Arc (unknown date)

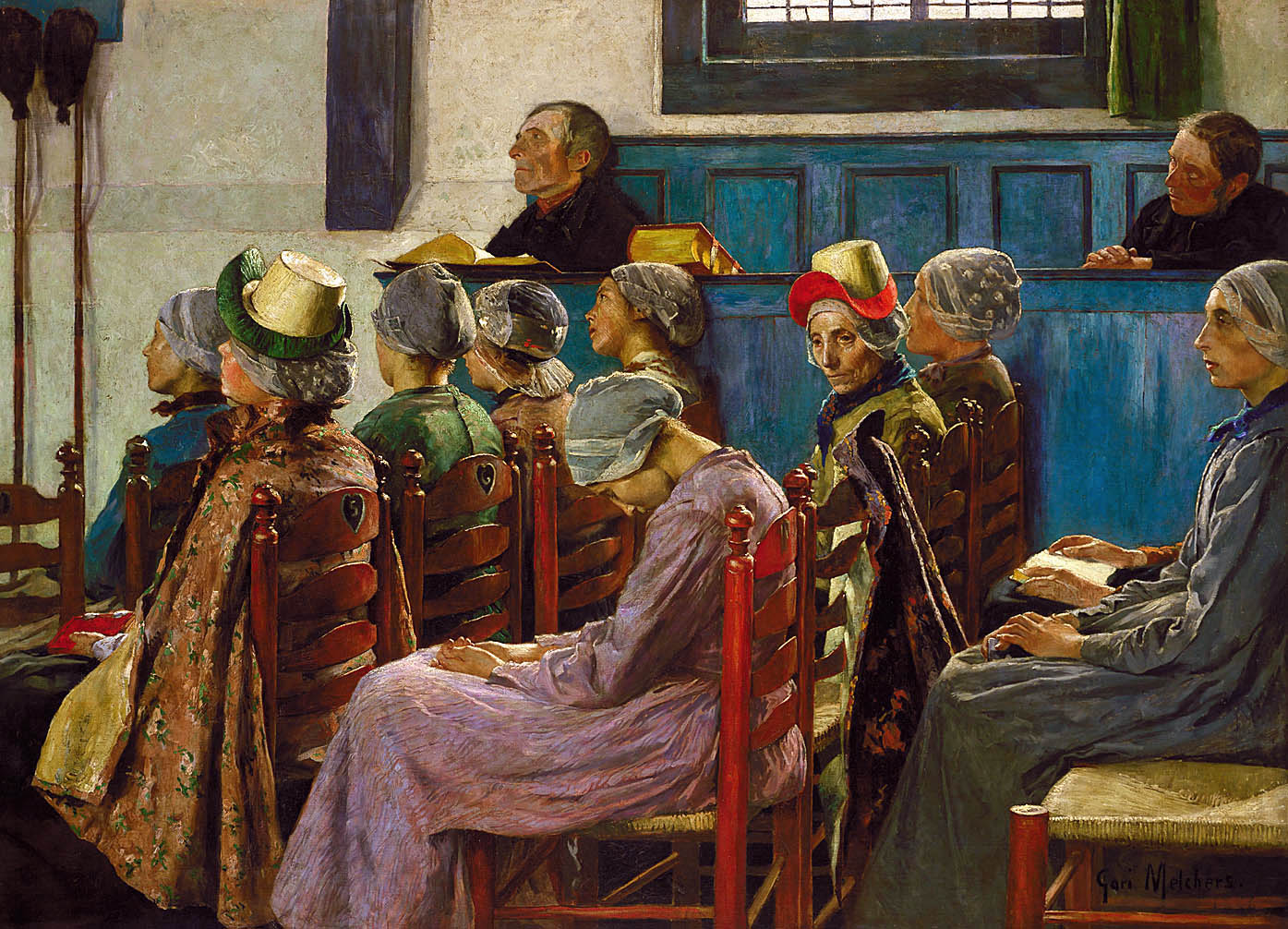
The Sermon, 1886
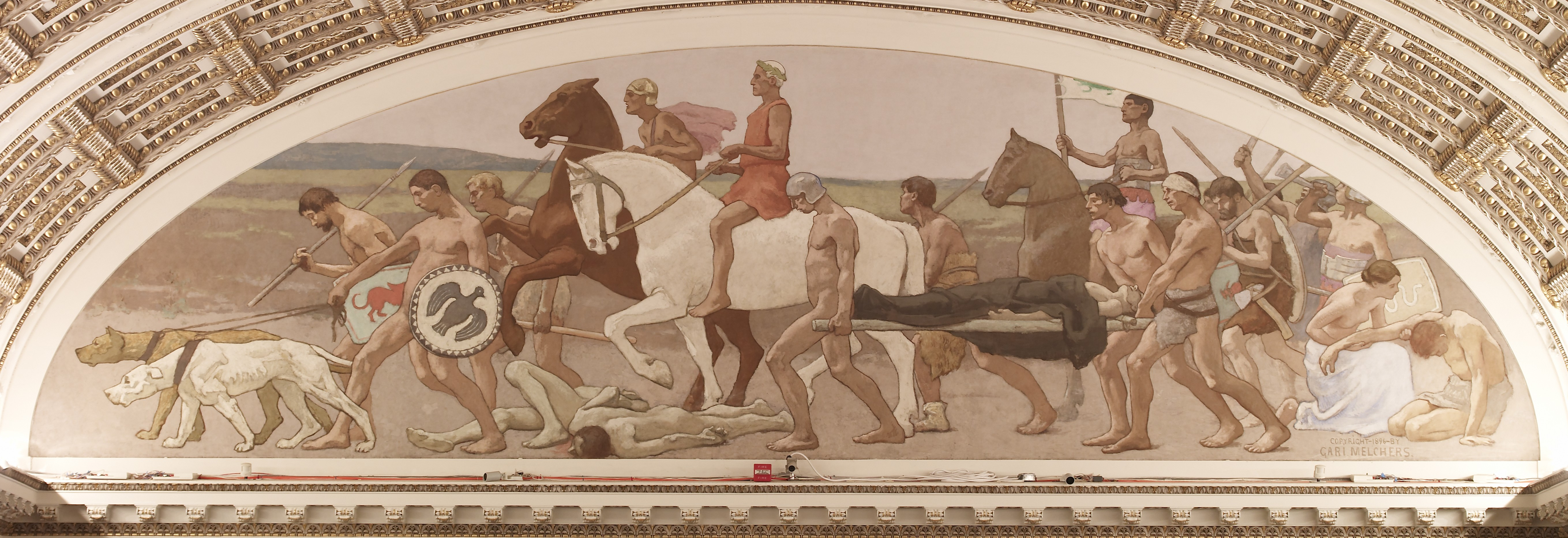
Mural of War, 1896.

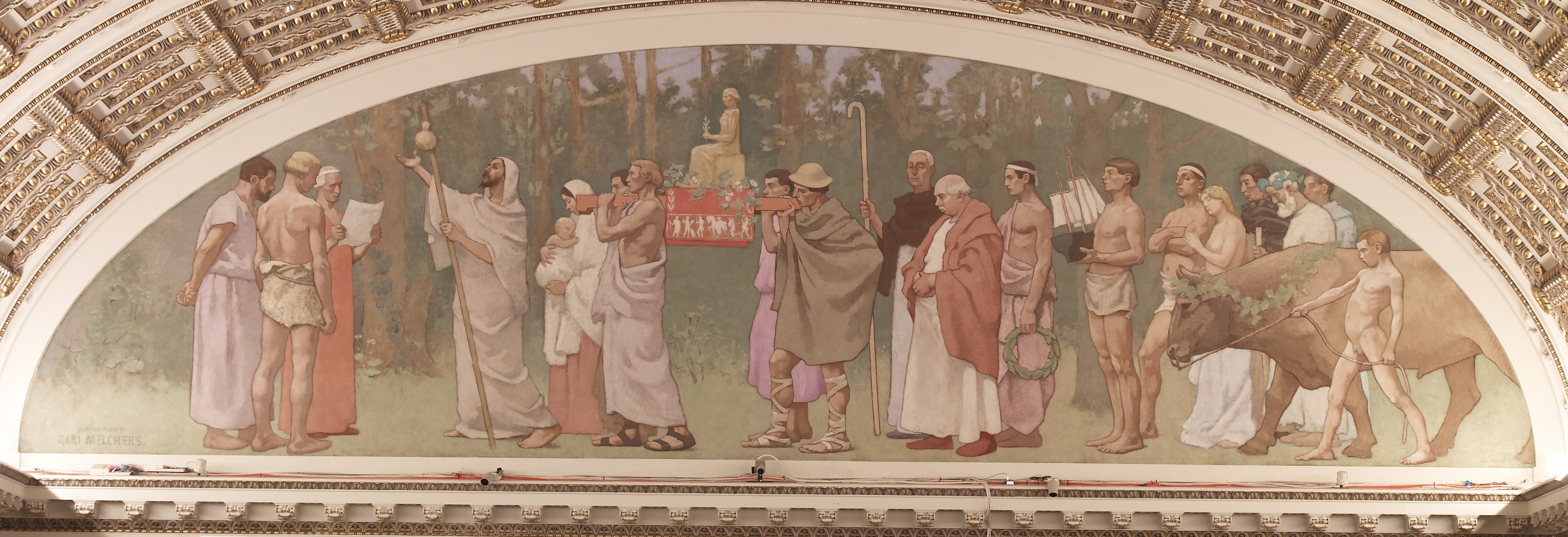
Mural of Peace, 1896

== Museum ==
The 18th-century Belmont estate was the country home and studio of prominent portraitist, muralist, and American Impressionist painter Gari Melchers (1860-1932). The house contains Gari and Corinne Melchers’ original furnishings and personal art collection, the studio houses over 1600 works by Melchers, and the 27-acre grounds feature restored formal gardens and miles of walking trails. The site, Gari Melchers Home & Studio, is now an American Association of Museums' Accredited museum and cultural center.

The mission of Gari Melchers Home and Studio is to display to the public on a regular basis the art works and furnishings that make up the Belmont collections; to maintain and preserve the collections and physical facilities of the estate in order that they will be available to the public for use by this and future generations; and to interpret the collections in a manner that will serve local educational institutions and the general public as a resource for studying the full range of works of a major American artist together with the tools of his trade in the locale in which he worked. The purpose of Gari Melchers Home and Studio is also to serve as an art center for the people of the Fredericksburg area.

== Further reading/viewing ==
- National Museum of American Art; National Portrait Gallery (Smithsonian Institution) (1993). Revisiting the white city: American art at the 1893 World's Fair. Washington, D.C. : Hanover: National Museum of American Art and National Portrait Gallery, Smithsonian Institution; Distributed by the University Press of New England. p. 286. ISBN 0937311014.
- Gari Melchers: American Master 1860-1932, by Joanna Catron, July 13, 2020
- True and Clear, video, Gari Melchers Home & Studio
- Gari Melchers Home and Studio's YouTube channel
