= Gari Melchers Home and Studio =

Historic house in Virginia, United States

- Belmont
- U.S. National Register of Historic Places
- U.S. National Historic Landmark District
- U.S. Historic district – Contributing property
- Virginia Landmarks Register
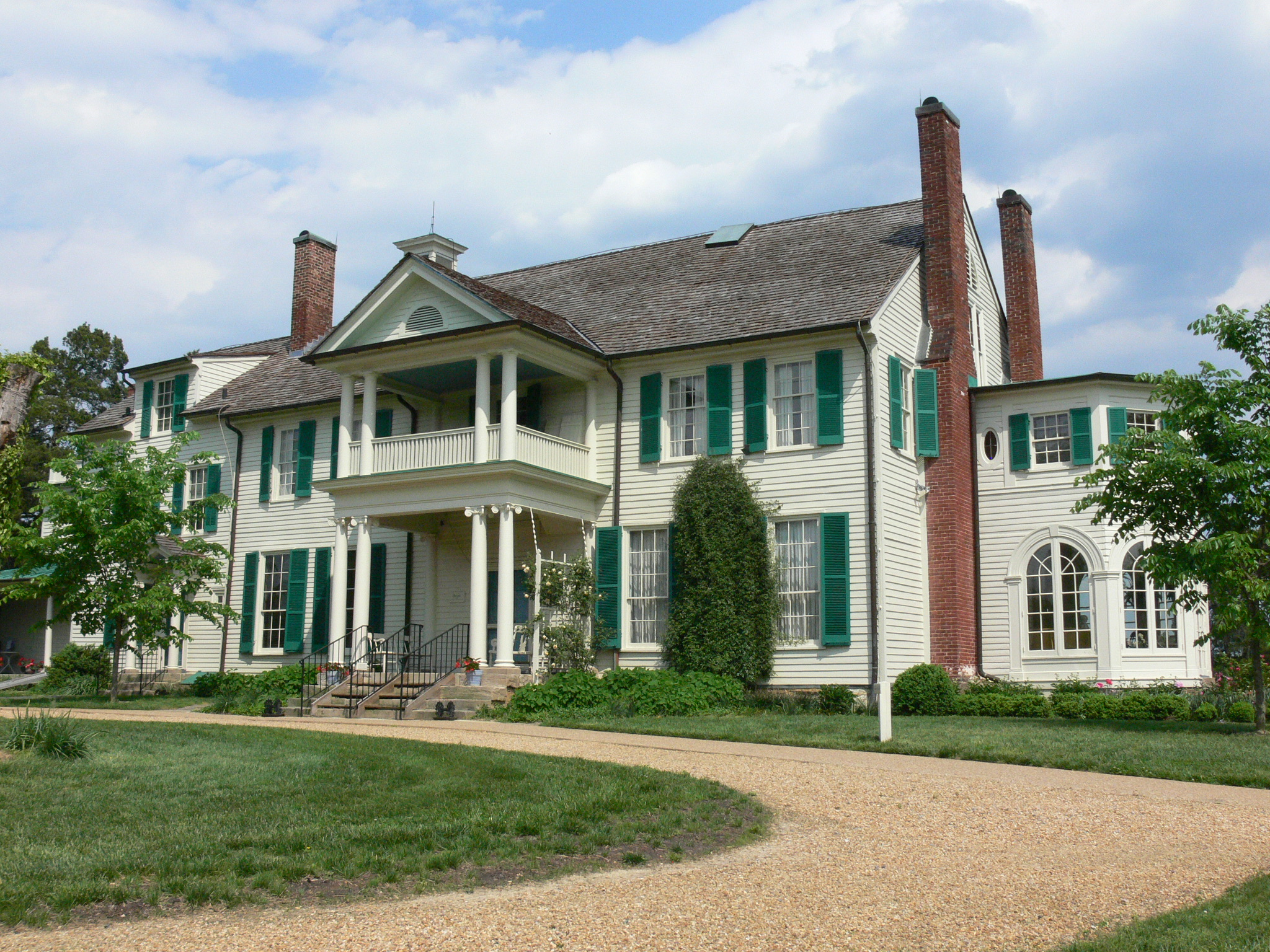

- Location within Northern Virginia Location within Virginia Location within the United States
- Location: 224 Washington Street, Falmouth, Virginia
- Coordinates: 38°19′30.1″N 77°28′22.5″W
- Area: 27 acres (11 ha)
- Built: 18th century
- Architect: John Dixon
- Part of: Falmouth Historic District (ID70000825)
- NRHP reference No.: 66000848
- VLR No.: 089-0022

Significant dates
- Added to NRHP: October 15, 1966
- Designated NHLD: December 21, 1965
- Designated CP: February 26, 1970
- Designated VLR: September 9, 1969

Gari Melchers Home and Studio, also known as Belmont, is a National Historic Landmark and historic house museum at 224 Washington Street in Falmouth, Virginia. This much-altered 18th-century house was the home and studio of the popular American artist Gari Melchers (1860–1932) from 1916 until his death. It was given to the state of Virginia by his widow, and is now administered by the University of Mary Washington. It was declared a National Historic Landmark in 1965, commemorating Melchers' influential role in bringing American art to European attention.

== Description and history ==
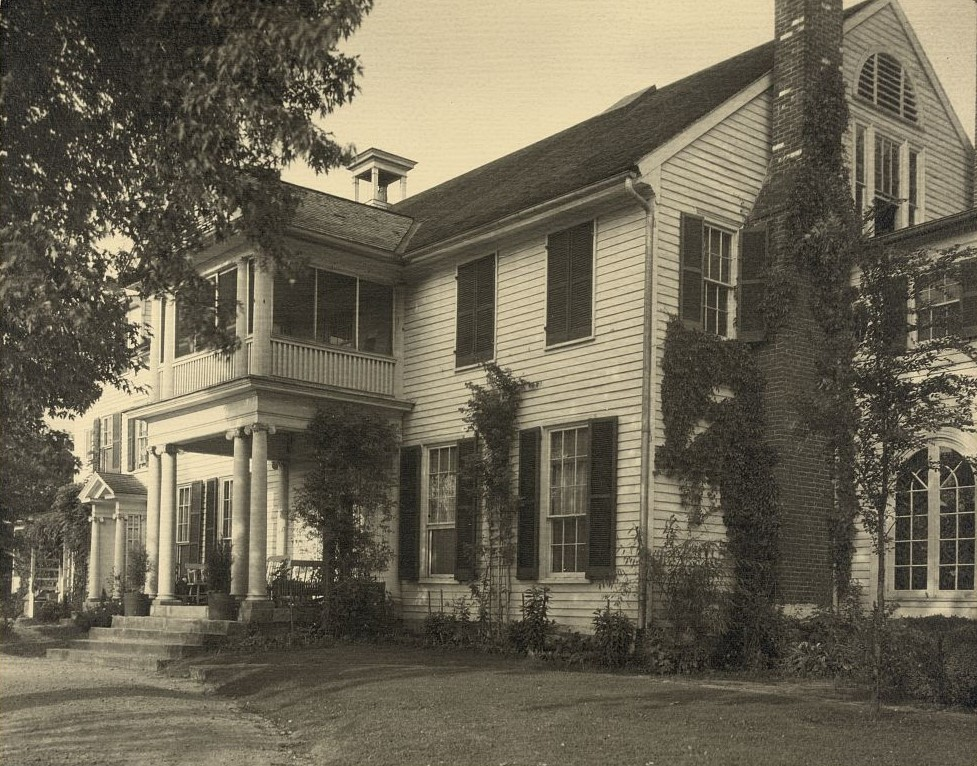
Belmont, west front, by Frances Benjamin Johnston, circa 1927

Gari Melchers Home and Studio is located just west of the center of Falmouth, on the south side of Business United States Route 17. The property is 27 acres (11 ha), roughly bisected by County Road 1001, which provides access to the main house. The house is a two-story wood-frame structure, its main block five bays wide, with a two-story ell extending it to the left, and a polygon-sided sunroom to the right. The oldest part of the house was built sometime in the mid-to-late 18th century, and achieved much of its present form during the ownership of the Ficklen family, which owned it from 1825 to 1916. In that year it was purchased by Gari Melchers and his wife Corinne, both artists, for $12,000 ($238,000 in 2024). The stone studio building on the grounds, and a stone garage, both date to the period of the Melchers' ownership, and the summer house was added by Mrs. Melchers sometime after her husband's death in 1932. After she died in 1955, Mrs. Melchers bequeathed the property to the state; it includes most of the couple's possessions in the house.

Gari Melchers was a popular, if not particularly innovative, painter, who was trained in Europe. In 1882 one of his paintings was accepted by the Salon of Paris, the most prestigious art exhibition of the period. Gari and Corinne Melchers settled at Belmont in 1916. His best known works include the murals depicting War and Peace in the rotunda of the Library of Congress in Washington, DC. Melchers' work contributed to a general increase of interest in the fine arts in the United States.

Unlike most historic homes in the commonwealth of Virginia, it is not furnished with antiques that correspond to the house's origins. Rather, it is a snapshot of the international tastes and lifestyle of a famous artist, and is fully furnished with the unusual European antiques and objects Melchers and his wife collected. It is also an art museum with about 1,600 works of art, about 500 of which are Melchers’ paintings. Other works of art include his sketches and studies, works by other artists he collected, and paintings by his wife.

== See also ==
- List of National Historic Landmarks in Virginia
- National Register of Historic Places listings in Stafford County, Virginia
- List of single-artist museums
