= Falmouth Historic District =

Historic district in Virginia, United States

- U.S. National Register of Historic Places
- U.S. Historic district
- Virginia Landmarks Register
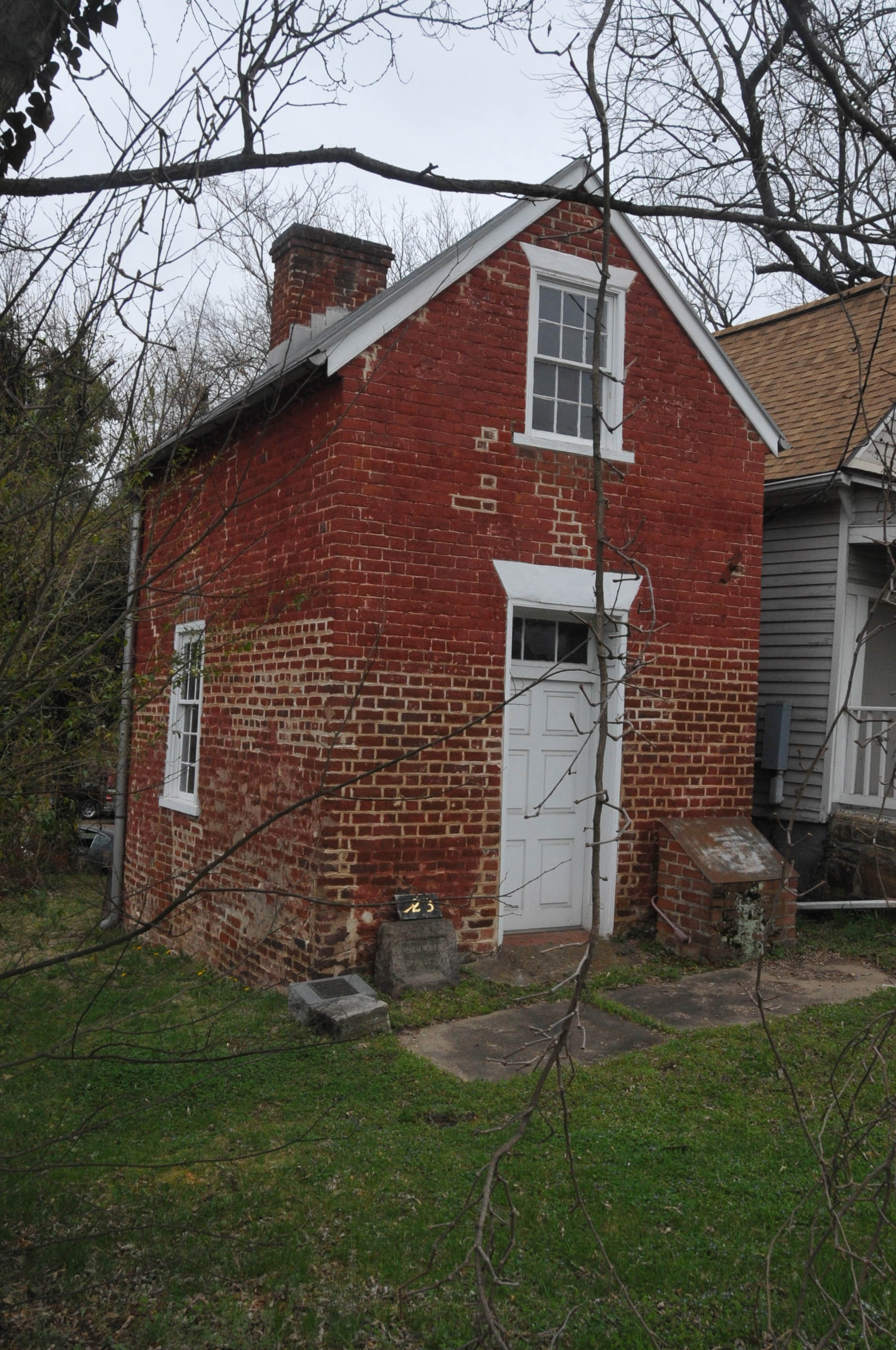
- Custom House

- Location within Northern Virginia Location within Virginia Location within the United States
- Location: Jct. of U.S. 1 and U.S. 17, Falmouth, Virginia
- Coordinates: 38°19′26″N 77°27′59″W
- Area: 225 acres (91 ha)
- Built: 1761
- Architectural style: Federal
- NRHP reference No.: 70000825
- VLR No.: 089-0067

Significant dates
- Added to NRHP: February 26, 1970
- Designated VLR: December 2, 1969

Falmouth Historic District is a national historic district located at Falmouth, Stafford County, Virginia. The district includes 29 contributing buildings in the historic core of the town of Falmouth. Notable buildings include Basil Gordon Warehouse, Customs House, the Double House, Highway Assembly of God Church, old Post Office, Calvary Pentecostal Tabernacle, the Tavern, Tavern Keeper's House, Union Methodist Church, Master Hobby School, and the Counting House. Located in the district are the separately listed Gari Melchers Home, Carlton, Clearview and Conway House.

It was listed on the National Register of Historic Places in 1970.

== Gallery ==
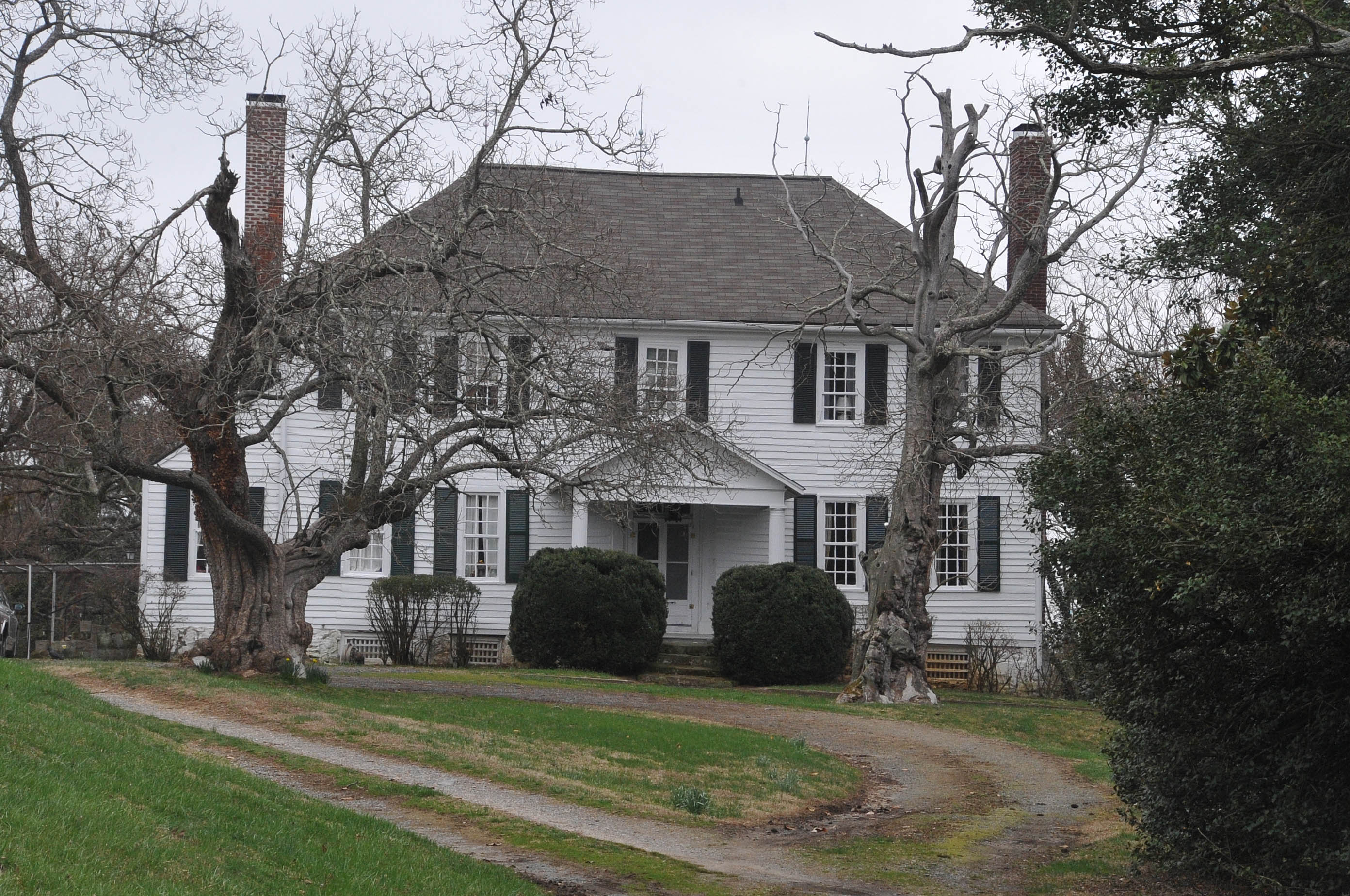
Carlton

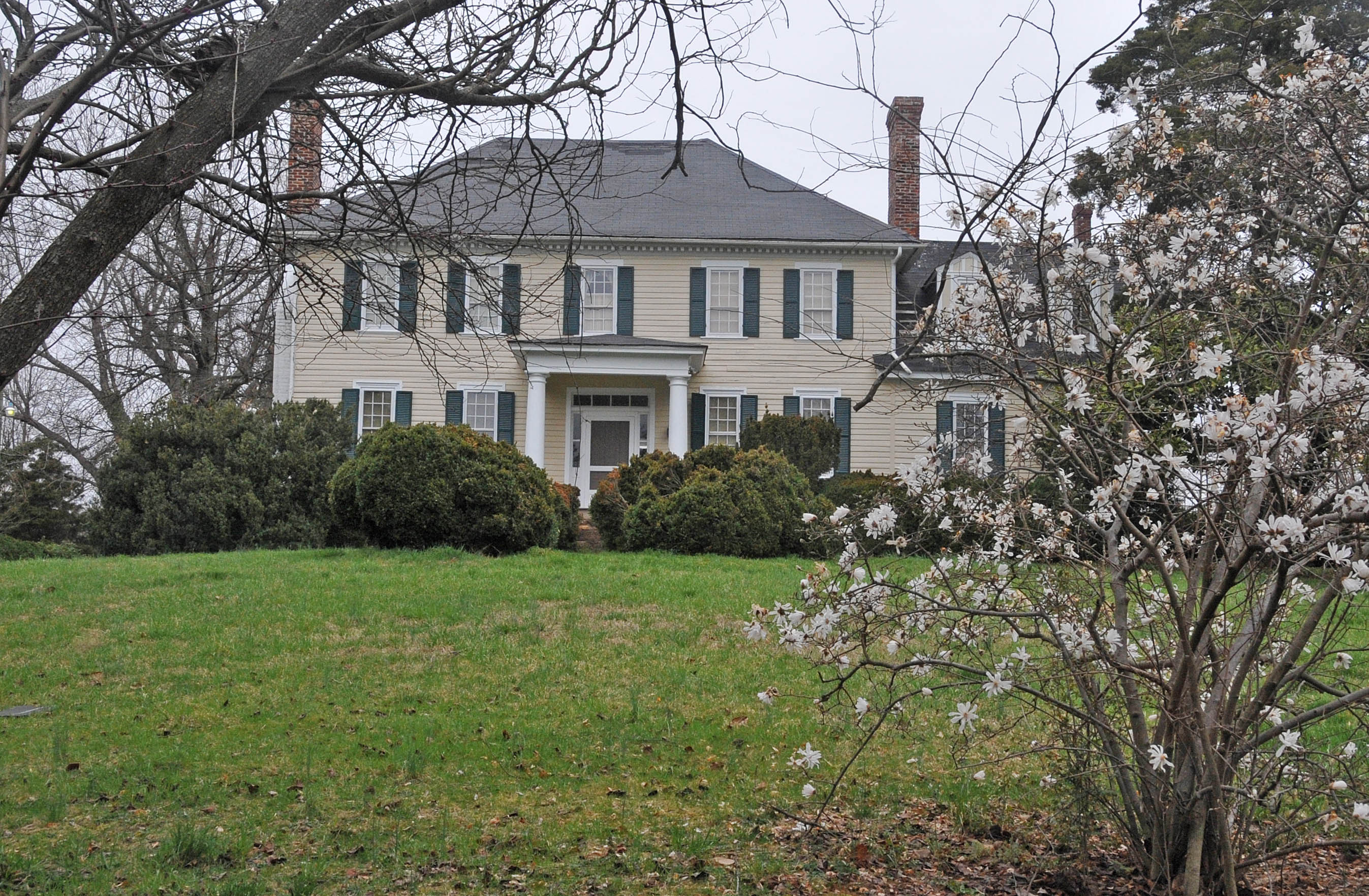
Clearview

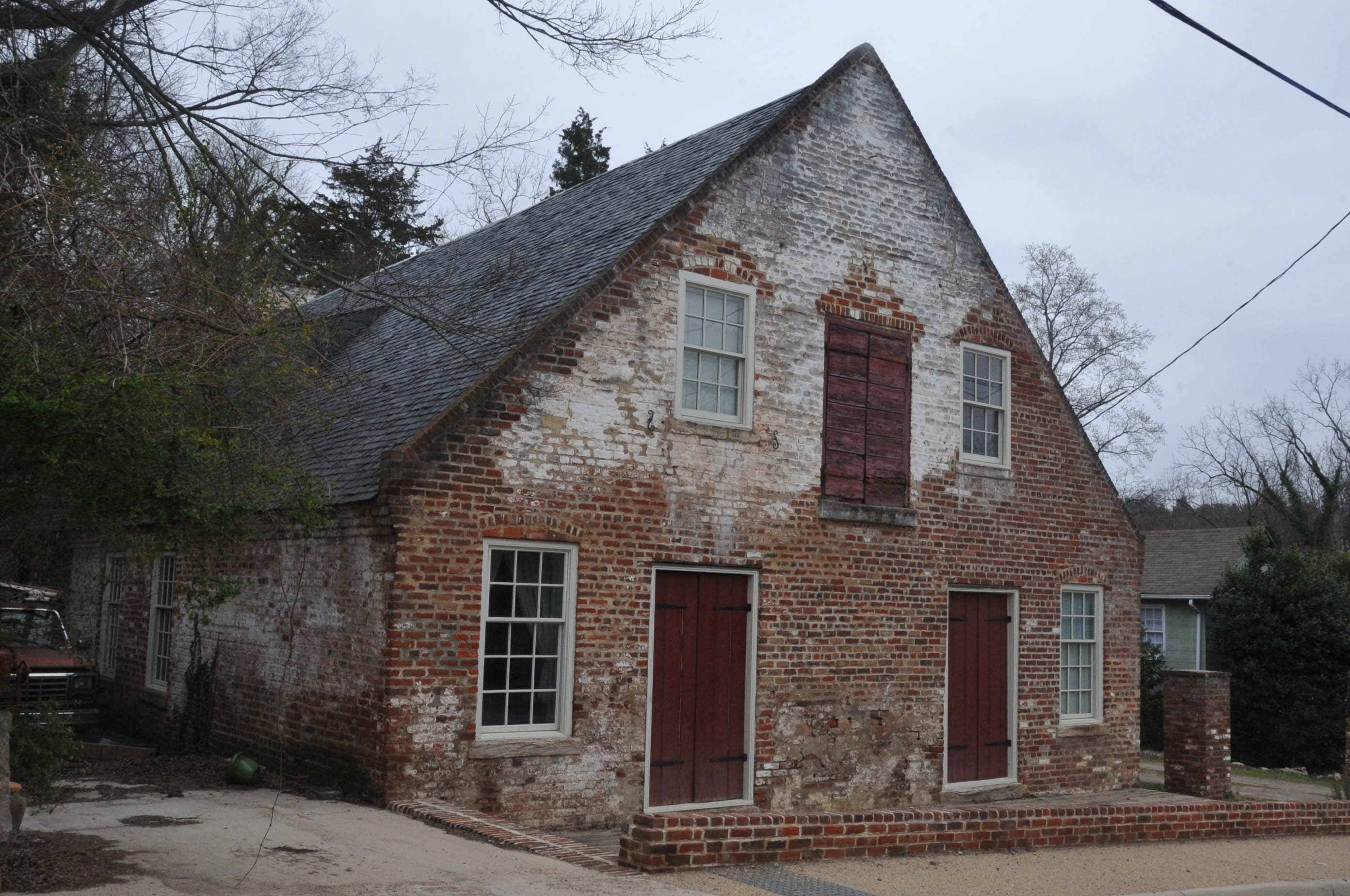
Tavern
