= Clearview (Falmouth, Virginia) =

Historic house in Virginia, United States

- U.S. National Register of Historic Places
- U.S. Historic district – Contributing property
- Virginia Landmarks Register
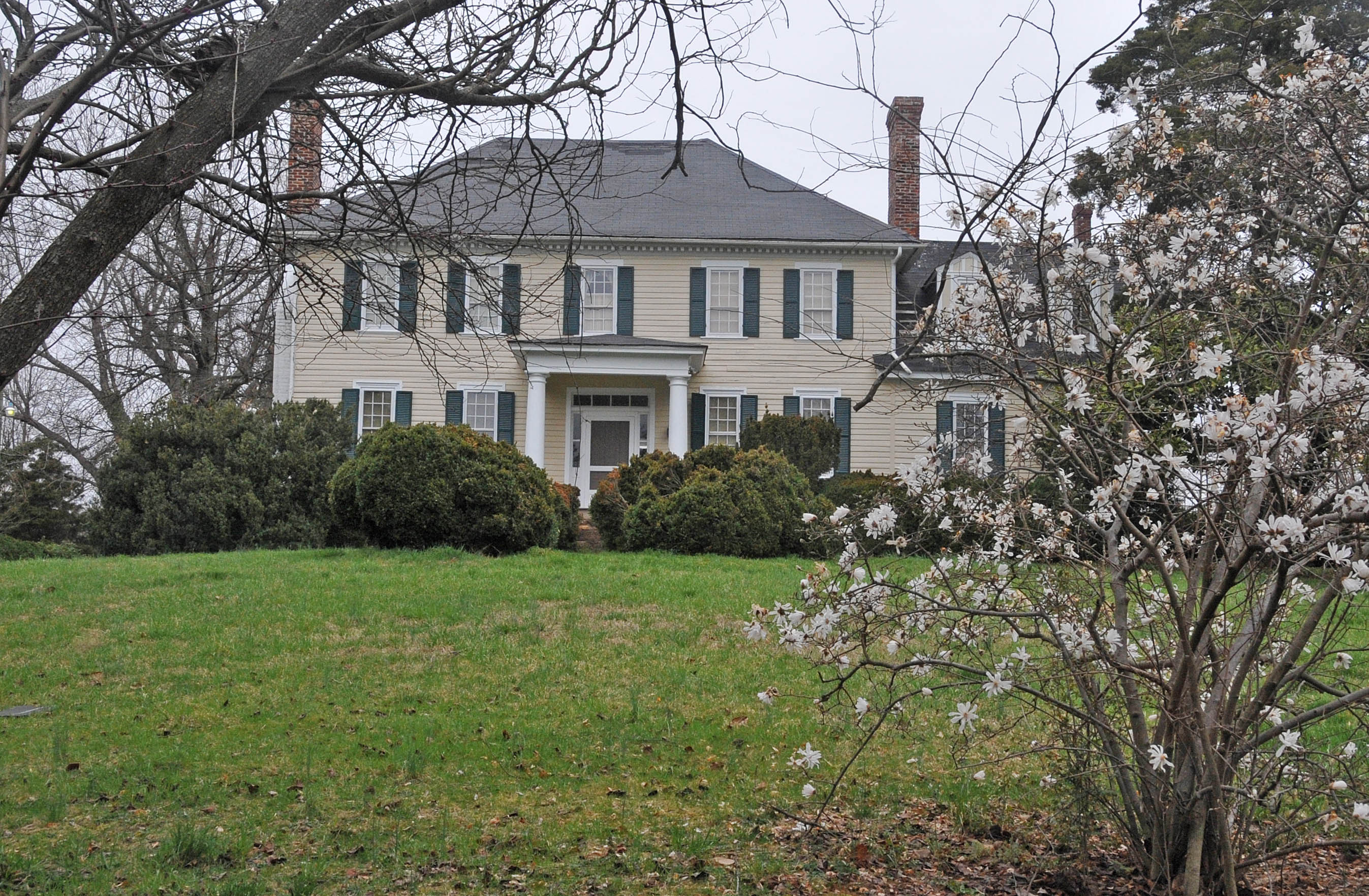

- Location within Northern Virginia Location within Virginia Location within the United States
- Location: Off Forbes St. near VA 664 and U.S. 1, Falmouth, Virginia
- Coordinates: 38°19′26″N 77°27′48″W
- Area: 22 acres (8.9 ha)
- Built: c. 1796
- NRHP reference No.: 75002039
- VLR No.: 089-0012

Significant dates
- Added to NRHP: February 24, 1975
- Designated VLR: November 19, 1974

Clearview is a historic home located at Falmouth, Stafford County, Virginia. It was built about 1749 and is a two-story, five-bay, frame dwelling. It has a hipped roof, exterior end chimneys, and a distyle Tuscan order front porch. The house measures approximately 42 feet by 26 feet, with an 18 by 26 foot wing added in 1918–1919. The property was used by the Union army as an artillery position during the Battle of Fredericksburg in December, 1862.

It was listed on the National Register of Historic Places in 1975. It is located in the Falmouth Historic District.
