= Conway House (Falmouth, Virginia) =

Historic house in Virginia, United States

- U.S. National Register of Historic Places
- U.S. Historic district – Contributing property
- Virginia Landmarks Register
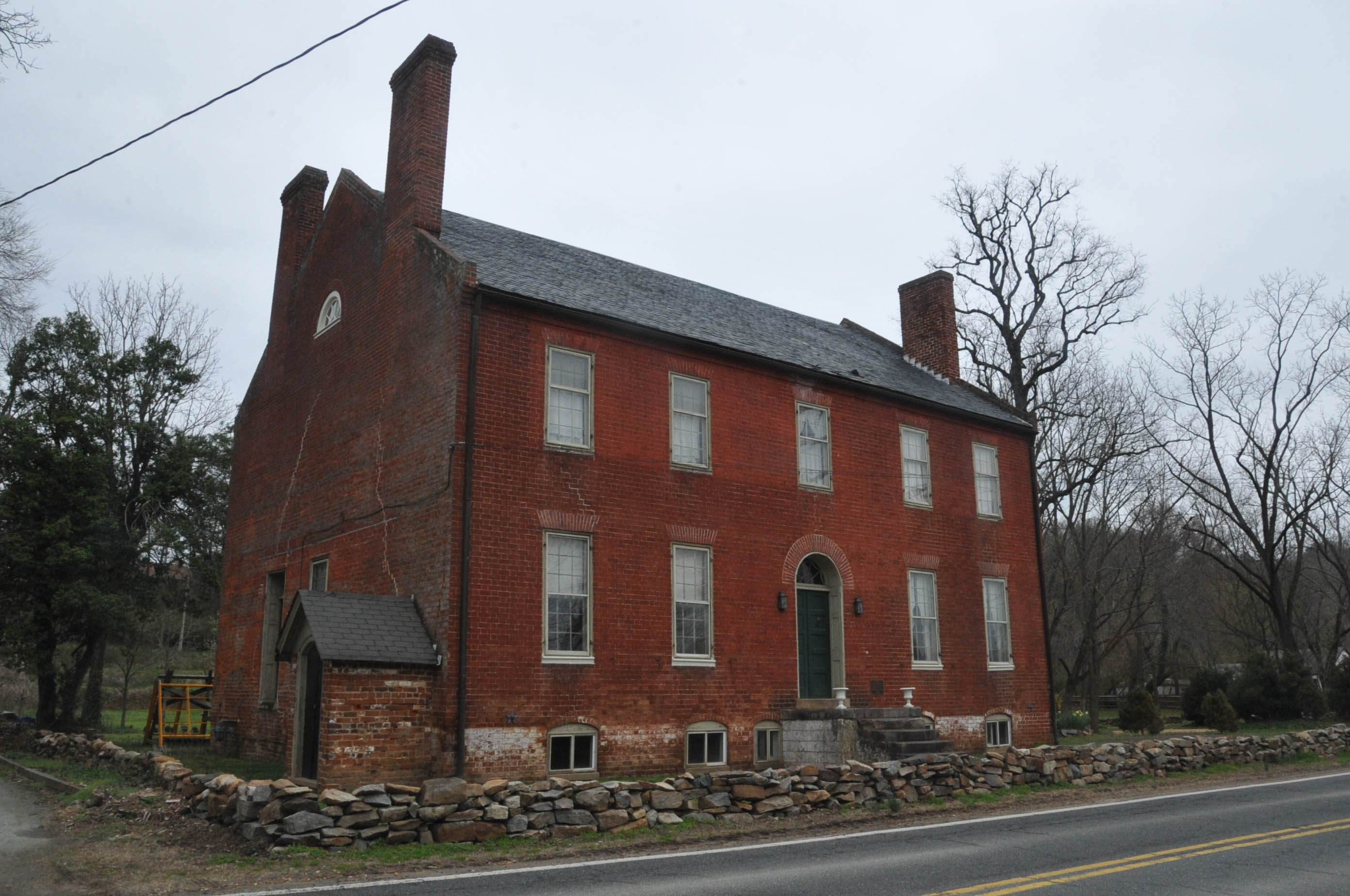

- Location within Northern Virginia Location within Virginia Location within the United States
- Location: 305 King St., Falmouth, Virginia
- Coordinates: 38°19′16″N 77°28′4″W
- Area: 2.5 acres (1.0 ha)
- Built: 1807
- Architectural style: Federal
- NRHP reference No.: 04000162
- VLR No.: 089-0067-0031

Significant dates
- Added to NRHP: March 8, 2004
- Designated VLR: December 3, 2003

Conway House, also known as the Moncure Daniel Conway House, is a historic home located at Falmouth, Stafford County, Virginia. It was the home of author, clergyman, and abolitionist Moncure D. Conway (1832-1907) and used as a Union hospital during the American Civil War.

The home was built in 1807, and is a large two-story, five-bay, L-shaped Federal style brick dwelling. It has a full basement, side-gable slate roof, brick interior-end chimneys.

It was listed on the National Register of Historic Places in 2004. In 2005, the National Park Service formally recognized the home as a National Underground Railroad Network to Freedom Historical Site. It is located in the Falmouth Historic District.
