= Hartwood Presbyterian Church =

Historic church in Virginia, United States

- U.S. National Register of Historic Places
- Virginia Landmarks Register
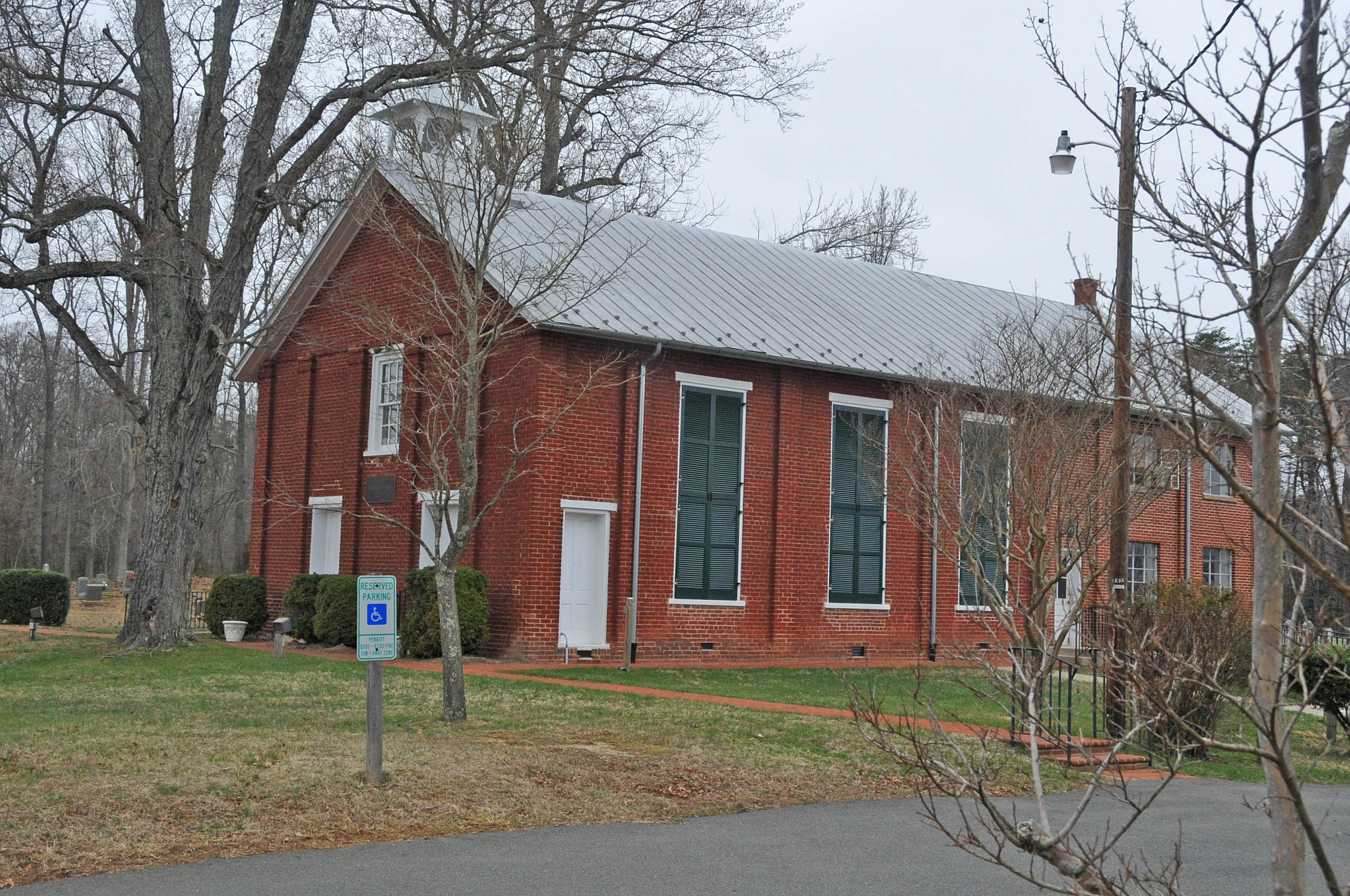

- Location within Northern Virginia Location within Virginia Location within the United States
- Location: Jct. VA 705 and 612, Hartwood, Virginia
- Coordinates: 38°24′6″N 77°34′2″W
- Area: 1.7 acres (0.69 ha)
- Built: 1857–1859, 1866
- Architectural style: Greek Revival
- NRHP reference No.: 89001929
- VLR No.: 089-0082

Significant dates
- Added to NRHP: November 13, 1989
- Designated VLR: April 18, 1989

Hartwood Presbyterian Church, also known as the Yellow Chapel Church, is a historic Presbyterian church located at the junction of VA 705 and 612 in Hartwood, Stafford County, Virginia. It was built between 1857 and 1859, and is a rectangular brick Greek Revival style church. The church was restored in 1866, after having been used by both sides during the American Civil War. During the war, it was the site of Wade Hampton's November 1862 capture of 137 men of the 3rd Pennsylvania Cavalry. The property includes the site of the Hartwood Chapel or Yellow Chapel of about 1767 and a graveyard. Hartwood Presbyterian Church was the only Presbyterian church in Stafford County from about 1807 until 1983.

It was listed on the National Register of Historic Places in 1989.
