= White Oak Church =

Historic church in Virginia, United States

- U.S. National Register of Historic Places
- Virginia Landmarks Register
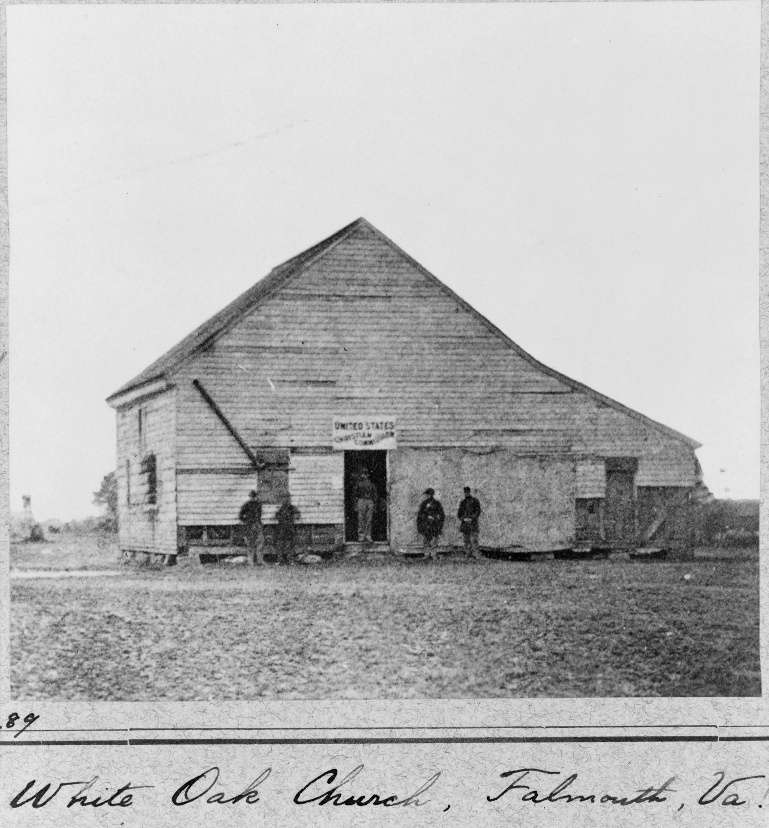
- White Oak Church around 1861

- Location within Northern Virginia Location within Virginia Location within the United States
- Location: 8 Caisson Rd., Falmouth, Virginia
- Coordinates: 38°18′1″N 77°22′33″W
- Area: 1.2 acres (0.49 ha)
- NRHP reference No.: 90002112
- VLR No.: 089-0076

Significant dates
- Added to NRHP: January 3, 1991
- Designated VLR: August 21, 1990

White Oak Church, also known as White Oak Baptist Church and White Oak Primitive Baptist Church, is a historic Primitive Baptist church located off White Oak Road in Falmouth, Stafford County, Virginia. It was built sometime between 1789 and 1835, and is a rectangular frame structure sheathed in weatherboard. Also on the property are a contributing woodshed, men's and women's outhouses, and two cemeteries.

During the Civil War in November 1862, White Oak Church became the center, for seven months, of an encampment of the Army of the Potomac. Around 20,000 soldiers of the VI Corps camped in the immediate area. At this time, the church served as a military hospital, a United States Christian Commission station, and as a photographic studio.

After the Civil War, some descendants of soldiers in the 15th New Jersey Volunteer Infantry made reunion trips to the Fredericksburg battlefields and White Oak Church. The reunion group included, J. Frank Lindsley; Henry B. Hoffman; his brother, Dr. Joseph R. Hoffman; Judge John B. Vreeland, a state senator from New Jersey; and Thomas B. Ironside. They aided in the repair of the church.

It was added to the National Register of Historic Places in 1991.
