= Union Church and Cemetery =

Historic church in Virginia, US

- U.S. National Register of Historic Places
- Virginia Landmarks Register
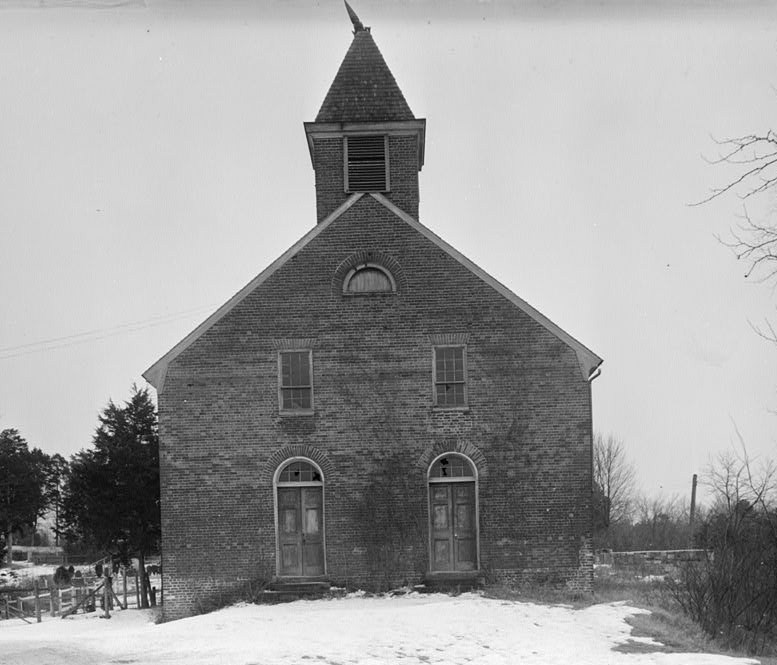
- Union Church, HABS Photo

- Location within Northern Virginia Location within Virginia Location within the United States
- Location: Carter St. and Butler Rd., Falmouth, Virginia
- Coordinates: 38°19′27″N 77°28′2″W
- Area: 3 acres (1.2 ha)
- Built: 1733
- Architectural style: Federal
- NRHP reference No.: 08000896
- VLR No.: 089-0067-0037

Significant dates
- Added to NRHP: September 10, 2008
- Designated VLR: June 19, 2008

Union Church and Cemetery is a historic Episcopal church and cemetery located at Falmouth, Stafford County, Virginia. The property contains the archaeological sites of the 1733 and 1750s Falmouth Anglican churches and the standing remains of the Union Church, built about 1819. The Union Church narthex, measuring 10 feet by 40 feet, is the section remaining from the Federal style building. The building contains an original stairway to the balcony and framing that extends upward to form the belfry which supports an estimated 300-pound bell. Also on the property is the church cemetery with headstones, dating from the 18th and the early 19th centuries through the 20th century. A violent rain storm in 1950 severely damaged the roof of the 40 feet wide by 54 feet long church leading to a collapse of the chancel and nave, leaving only the narthex intact.

It was listed on the National Register of Historic Places in 2008.
