= Hartwood Manor =

Historic house in Virginia, United States

- U.S. National Register of Historic Places
- Virginia Landmarks Register
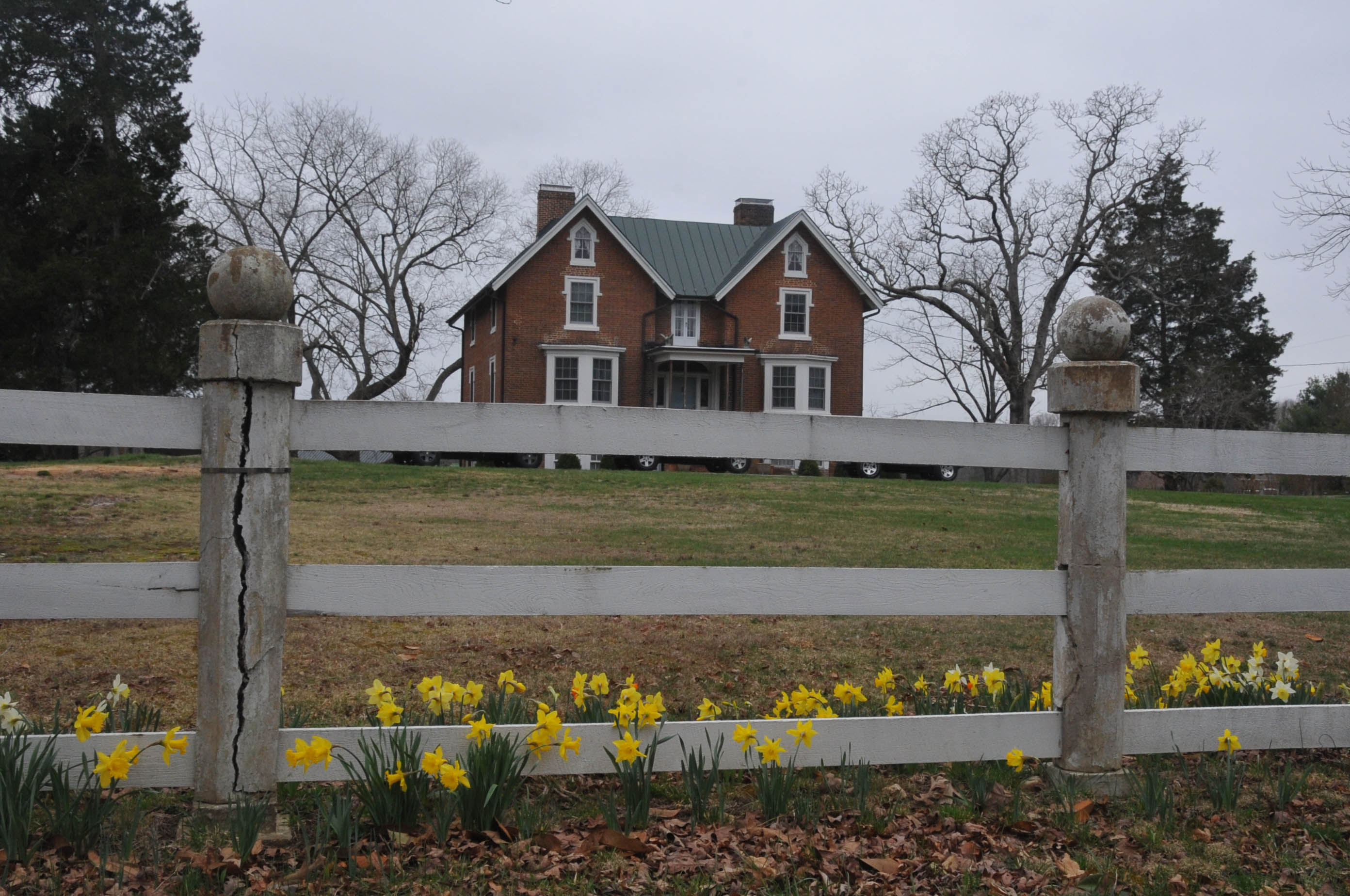

- Location within Northern Virginia Location within Virginia Location within the United States
- Location: 335 Hartwood Rd., Hartwood, Virginia
- Coordinates: 38°25′14″N 77°34′25″W
- Area: 8.9 acres (3.6 ha)
- Built: 1848
- Built by: Burns, Anthony
- Architectural style: Gothic Revival
- NRHP reference No.: 05001618
- VLR No.: 089-0021

Significant dates
- Added to NRHP: February 1, 2006
- Designated VLR: December 7, 2005

Hartwood Manor, also known as Old Foote Place, is a historic home located at Hartwood, Stafford County, Virginia. It was built in 1848, and is a 2 1/2-story, three bay Gothic Revival style brick dwelling. It has a rear ell added in 1967. It features a steeply pitched, cross-gable roof; one-story, polygonal bay windows; pointed and square-arched drip moldings; modified lancet-arch windows; and deep eaves with exposed rafter ends. The property includes the contributing frame barn, a concrete block milk house, a frame chicken house, and a frame workshop, all dated to the early-20th century. A contributing hand-dug well dates to the mid-19th century.

It was listed on the National Register of Historic Places in 2006.
