= Hartwood, Virginia =

Hartwood
- Unincorporated community
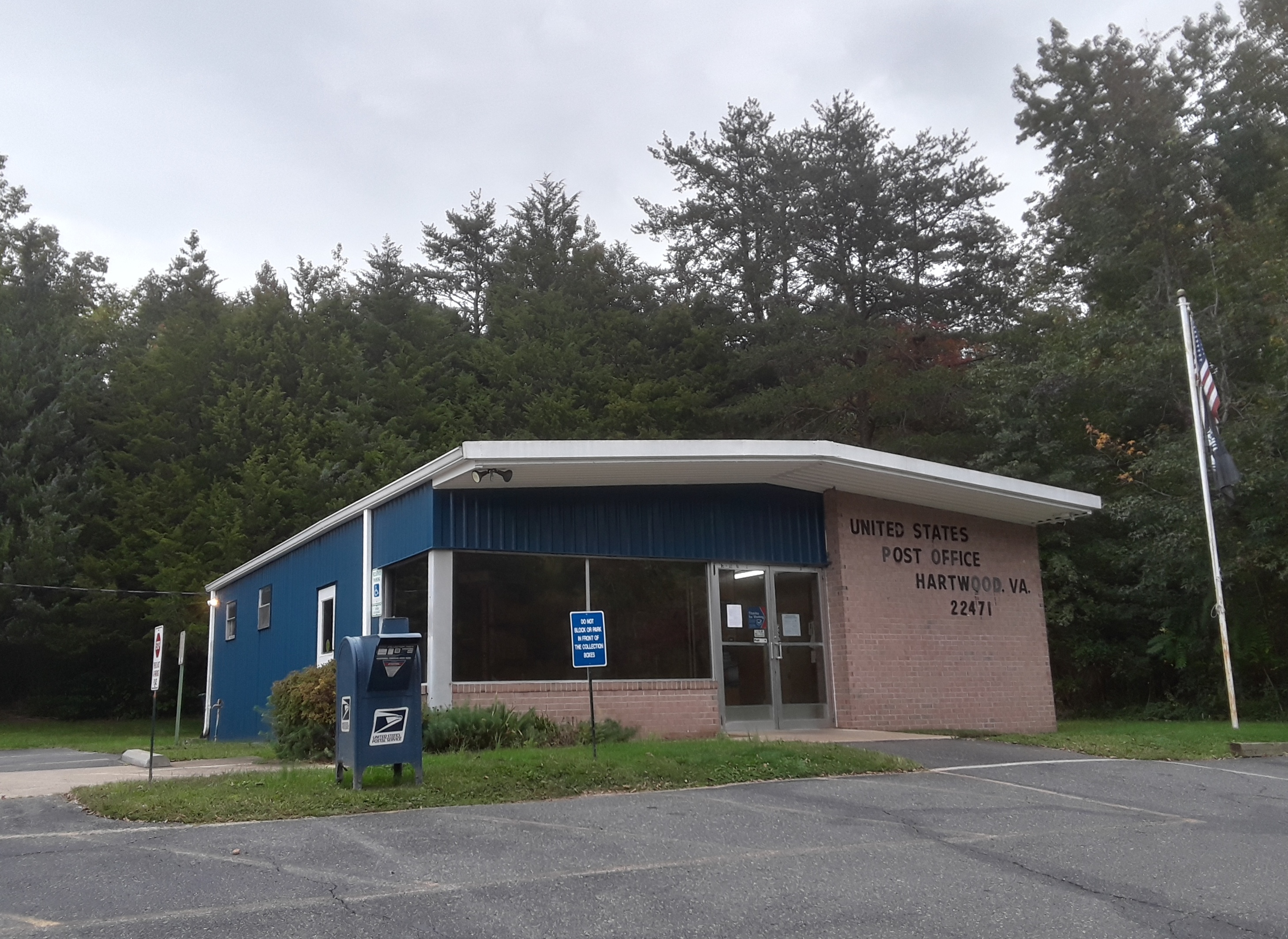
- Hartwood post office in October, 2020

- Location within the state of Virginia Hartwood (Virginia) Hartwood (the United States)
- Coordinates: 38°24′8″N 77°33′55″W
- Country: United States
- State: Virginia
- County: Stafford
- Time zone: UTC−5 (Eastern (EST))
  - Summer (DST): UTC−4 (EDT)
- ZIP code: 22471

Hartwood is an unincorporated community in Stafford County in the Commonwealth of Virginia, a U.S. state. Hartwood is located fifteen miles northwest of Fredericksburg.

The former Hartwood Airport is located near the community.

== History ==
A post office called Hartwood has been in operation since 1832. The district was named from the hart seen by settlers in the woods.

Hartwood Manor and Hartwood Presbyterian Church are listed on the National Register of Historic Places.
