= Carlton (Falmouth, Virginia) =

Historic house in Virginia, United States

- U.S. National Register of Historic Places
- U.S. Historic district – Contributing property
- Virginia Landmarks Register
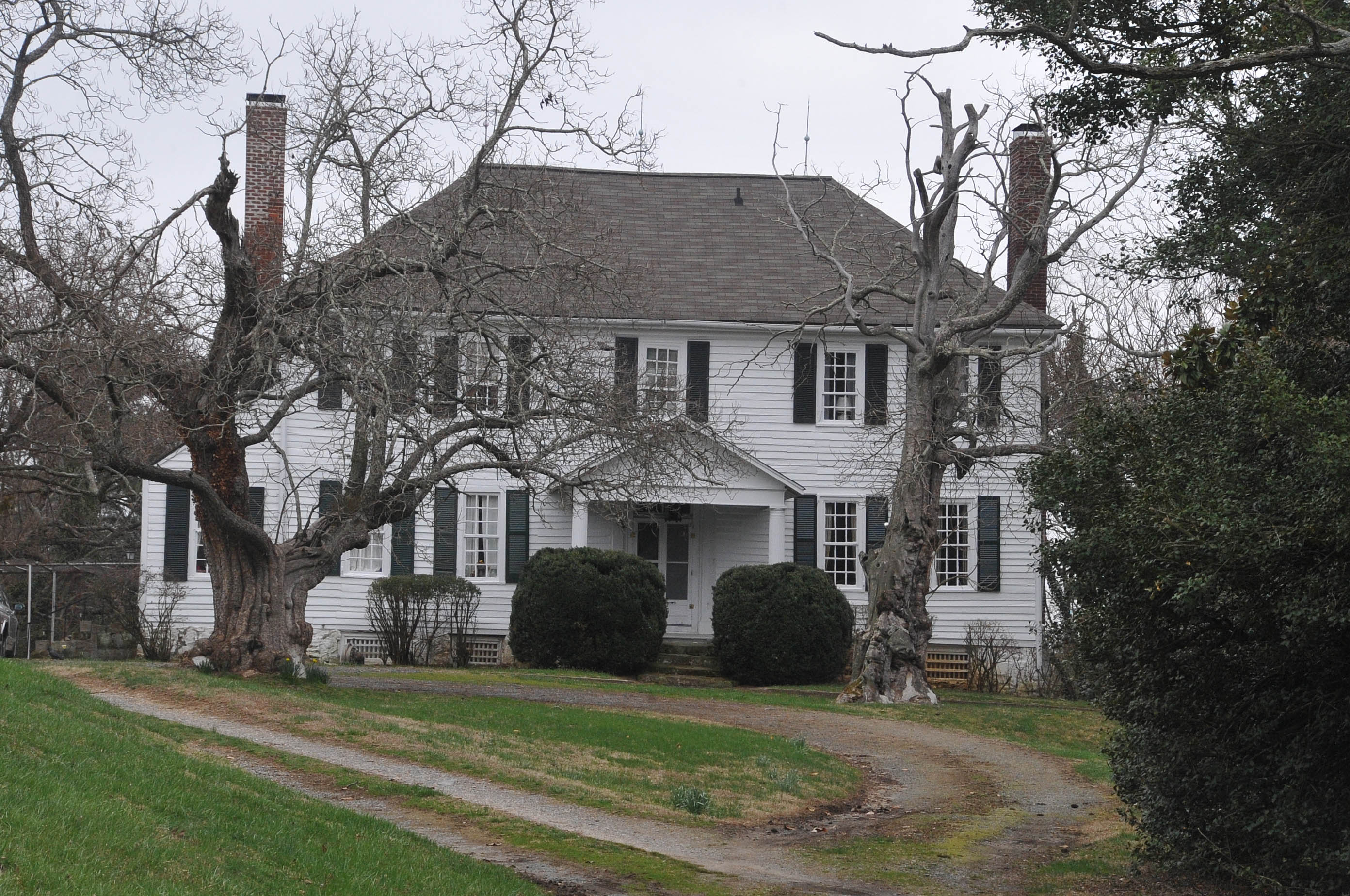

- Location within Northern Virginia Location within Virginia Location within the United States
- Location: 501 Melchers Dr., Falmouth, Virginia
- Coordinates: 38°19′32″N 77°28′15″W
- Area: 15 acres (6.1 ha)
- Built: c. 1785
- Architectural style: Georgian
- NRHP reference No.: 73002064
- VLR No.: 089-0010

Significant dates
- Added to NRHP: October 3, 1973
- Designated VLR: July 17, 1973

Carlton is a historic home located at Falmouth, Stafford County, Virginia. It was built about 1785, and is a two-story, five-bay, Georgian style frame dwelling. It has a hipped roof, interior end chimneys, and a front porch added about 1900. The house measures approximately 48 feet by 26 feet. Also on the property are the contributing frame kitchen partially converted to a garage, frame dairy, and brick meat house.

It was listed on the National Register of Historic Places in 1973. It is located in the Falmouth Historic District.
