= Historic Garden Week =

Historic Garden Week is a yearly, state-wide event across Virginia where tours of public gardens and landscapes are organized by member clubs of the Garden Club of Virginia, with the main purpose being to raise funds for their preservation, including projects at important landmarks like Monticello, Mount Vernon, and Montpelier. The tradition originated in 1929, when the Garden Club of Virginia organized a flower show to raise approximately $7,000 to preserve trees planted by Thomas Jefferson at Monticello.

The event's revenue also funds research fellowship programs, such as the Rudy J. Favretti Fellowship and the William D. Rieley Fellowship, that assist graduate students seeking a master's degree in landscape architecture or an equivalent.

Over $500 million has been raised from Historic Garden Week over the last 50 years to fund preservation efforts and research fellowship programs.

The event has been recognized as a significant source of tourism in Virginia by authorities such as the American Bus Organization, the Virginia Tourism Corporation, and governors of Virginia.
