= Falmouth, Virginia =

Census-designated place in Virginia, US

- Census-designated place (CDP)
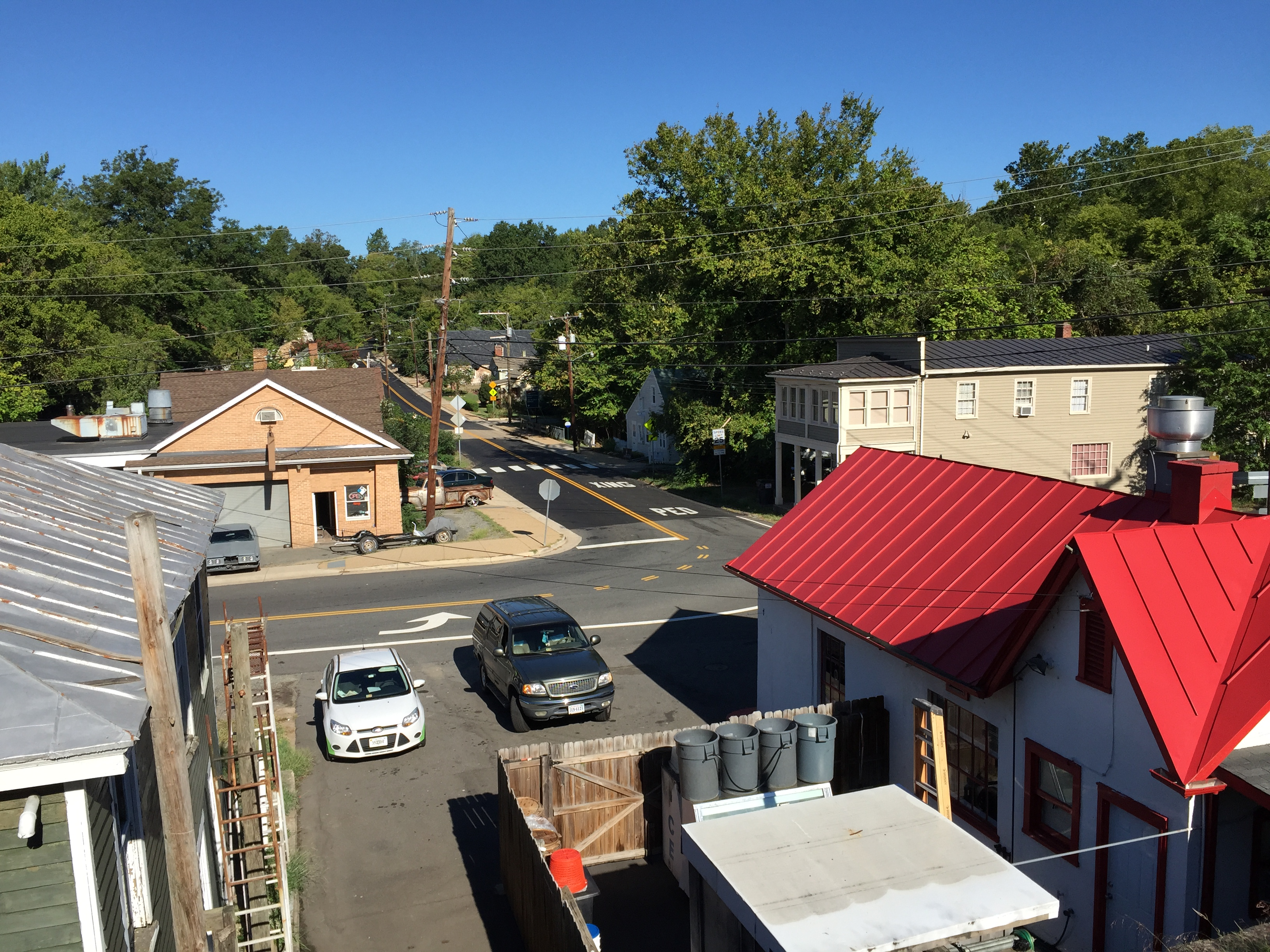
- Central Falmouth, as seen from US 1 and US 17 Bus

- Location in Stafford County and the state of Virginia.
- Coordinates: 38°19′54″N 77°27′41″W
- Country: United States
- State: Virginia
- County: Stafford

Area
  - Total: 3.2 sq mi (8.4 km^{2})
  - Land: 3.1 sq mi (8.1 km^{2})
  - Water: 0.12 sq mi (0.3 km^{2})
- Elevation: 56 ft (17 m)

Population (2020)
  - Total: 4,956
  - Density: 1,600/sq mi (610/km^{2})
- Time zone: UTC−5 (Eastern (EST))
  - Summer (DST): UTC−4 (EDT)
- Area code: 540
- FIPS code: 51-27264
- GNIS feature ID: 1494919

Falmouth is a census-designated place (CDP) in Stafford County, Virginia, United States. Situated on the north bank of the Rappahannock River at the falls, the community is north of and opposite the city of Fredericksburg. Recognized by the U.S. Census Bureau as a census-designated place (CDP), Falmouth's population was 4,956 as of the 2020 census.

== History ==
Founded in 1728 by the same act of the Virginia General Assembly that established neighboring Fredericksburg, Falmouth was created as a port town on the Rappahannock to serve inhabitants living north of the river within the vast Northern Neck holdings of Lord Fairfax. His agent, Robert "King" Carter, promoted the establishment of the town, and the Carter family played a dominant role in the town's development throughout much of the colonial period.

Hunter's Ironworks, also known as Rappahannock Forge, was an iron furnace located near Falmouth. Thomas Jefferson made special provision to protect the ironworks during the American Revolution.

The Falmouth Road was a colonial road that served as the main route connecting Winchester in the Shenandoah Valley to the port of Falmouth. This road follows a northwesterly route that was originally called the Shenandoah Hunting Path and crossed through the Piedmont counties of Stafford and Fauquier before passing over the Blue Ridge Mountains at Ashby's Gap. Modern day US Highway 17 follows much of this route. Originally located within King George County, Falmouth became part of Stafford when county lines were redrawn in 1776.

It was a stop on the Richmond, Fredericksburg and Potomac Railroad in the 19th century which was replaced by CSXT today. During the Civil War, Falmouth was occupied by the Union Army in 1862 and 1863, and Northern commanders located their headquarters southeast of the town during the Fredericksburg and Chancellorsville campaigns. In May 1864, Union wounded and Confederate prisoners from the Battles of the Wilderness and Spotsylvania Court House were transported through the area to the wharves at Belle Plain on Potomac Creek, a tributary of the Potomac River, located east of Falmouth.

Today Falmouth is a residential community and a suburb of Fredericksburg. Among the community's significant historic structures is Belmont, the home of American artist Gari Melchers, now a historic house museum administered by University of Mary Washington. Chatham Manor, the 1771 home of William Fitzhugh and a Union headquarters during the Civil War, is located downstream from Falmouth, opposite the historic district of Fredericksburg. It is administered by the National Park Service as part of Fredericksburg and Spotsylvania County Battlefields Memorial National Military Park and now serves as park headquarters.

Carlton, Clearview, the Conway House, Falmouth Historic District, Hunter's Ironworks, Union Church and Cemetery, and White Oak Church are listed on the National Register of Historic Places.

== Geography ==
Falmouth is located at 38°19′54″N 77°27′41″W (38.331790, −77.461361).

According to the United States Census Bureau, Falmouth has a total area of 3.2 square miles (8.4 km^{2}), of which 3.1 square miles (8.1 km^{2}) is land and 0.1 square mile (0.3 km^{2}) (3.09%) is water.

== Demographics ==
Historical population
Census	Pop.	Note	%±
1950	1,176		—
1960	1,478		25.7%
1970	2,139		44.7%
1980	3,271		52.9%
1990	3,541		8.3%
2000	3,624		2.3%
2010	4,274		17.9%
2020	4,956		16.0%
U.S. Decennial Census; 1940 1950 1960 1970; 1980 1990 2000 2010

Falmouth first appeared as an unincorporated community in the 1950 U.S. census; and as a census designated place in the 1980 U.S. census.

=== 2020 census ===
As of the 2020 census, Falmouth had a population of 4,956. The median age was 37.1 years. 24.6% of residents were under the age of 18 and 15.4% were 65 years of age or older. For every 100 females, there were 97.2 males, and for every 100 females age 18 and over, there were 92.7 males.

100.0% of residents lived in urban areas, while 0.0% lived in rural areas.

There were 1,765 households, of which 35.5% had children under the age of 18 living in them. Of all households, 51.7% were married-couple households, 14.5% were households with a male householder and no spouse or partner present, and 25.7% were households with a female householder and no spouse or partner present. About 23.8% of all households were made up of individuals, and 11.2% had someone living alone who was 65 years of age or older.

There were 1,892 housing units, of which 6.7% were vacant. The homeowner vacancy rate was 1.5% and the rental vacancy rate was 10.5%.

Racial composition as of the 2020 census
Race	Number	Percent
White	3,029	61.1%
Black or African American	932	18.8%
American Indian and Alaska Native	33	0.7%
Asian	173	3.5%
Native Hawaiian and Other Pacific Islander	7	0.1%
Some other race	258	5.2%
Two or more races	524	10.6%
Hispanic or Latino (of any race)	599	12.1%

=== 2000 census ===
As of the census of 2000, there were 3,624 people, 1,323 households, and 997 families residing in the CDP. The population density was 1,155.6 people per square mile (445.6/km^{2}). There were 1,412 housing units at an average density of 450.3/sq mi (173.6/km^{2}). The racial makeup of the CDP was 89.29% White, 6.46% Black or African American, 0.22% Native American, 1.08% Asian, 0.61% from other races, and 2.35% from two or more races. Hispanic or Latino of any race were 2.15% of the population.

There were 1,323 households, out of which 35.1% had children under the age of 18 living with them, 58.5% were married couples living together, 11.9% had a female householder with no husband present, and 24.6% were non-families. 18.9% of all households were made up of individuals, and 6.7% had someone living alone who was 65 years of age or older. The average household size was 2.68 and the average family size was 3.03.

In the CDP, the population was spread out, with 26.2% under the age of 18, 7.3% from 18 to 24, 27.6% from 25 to 44, 25.6% from 45 to 64, and 13.3% who were 65 years of age or older. The median age was 38 years. For every 100 females, there were 92.3 males. For every 100 females age 18 and over, there were 89.3 males.

The median income for a household in the CDP was $57,697, and the median income for a family was $66,989. Males had a median income of $39,280 versus $31,202 for females. The per capita income for the CDP was $25,544. About 5.9% of families and 7.3% of the population were below the poverty line, including 12.6% of those under age 18 and none of those age 65 or over.

== Recreation ==
Lake Mooney is a 520-acre reservoir in Falmouth and is the newest lake in Virginia. The lake was named for Jason Mooney, who was a Stafford sheriff's deputy who died in the line of work in 2007. The lake is primarily used for recreation. The lake is stocked with game fish and officially opened for sport fishing in July 2017.

== Notable people ==
- Moncure Daniel Conway, abolitionist
- Bazil Gordon, America's first millionaire.
- Wellington Gordon, Virginia state legislator
- Brian Henderson, racing driver
- William J. Howell, Speaker of the Virginia House of Delegates
- Gari Melchers, artist.
- James A. Seddon, Confederate States Secretary of War

== Climate ==
The climate in this area is characterized by hot, humid summers and generally mild to cool winters. According to the Köppen Climate Classification system, Falmouth has a humid subtropical climate, abbreviated "Cfa" on climate maps.
