= Aquia =

Aquia may refer to:

- Aquia (video game)
- Aquia, Virginia
- Aquia District, Peru
- Aquia Creek
  - Battle of Aquia Creek
  - Aquia Creek sandstone
- Aquia Formation, a fossil site
- Aquia Church, historic Episcopal Church (USA) Episcopal church and parish

== See also ==
- Acquia
