= Aquia, Virginia =

Unincorporated community in Virginia, US

Coordinates: 38°28′56″N 77°23′12″W

Aquia ( /ɑːˈkwaɪə/) is an unincorporated community in Stafford County, in the U.S. state of Virginia. It is named for Aquia Creek, which leads to the Potomac River. Nearby historic locations include Aquia Church and the remains of Aquia quarry. Cliffs of the local Aquia Creek sandstone had been visible from the Potomac River near its confluence with Aquia Creek during colonial times. It was quarried to construct many buildings nearby (including Christ Church and Mount Vernon), as well as in Washington, D.C., including the White House, National Capitol Columns and Washington Monument (which was completed with other stone after the original Aquia quarry was depleted). It was a stop on the Richmond, Fredericksburg and Potomac Railroad which was replaced by, CSXT.

== See also ==
- Aquia Harbor, Virginia
