= Stafford County, Virginia =

County in Virginia, United States

- County
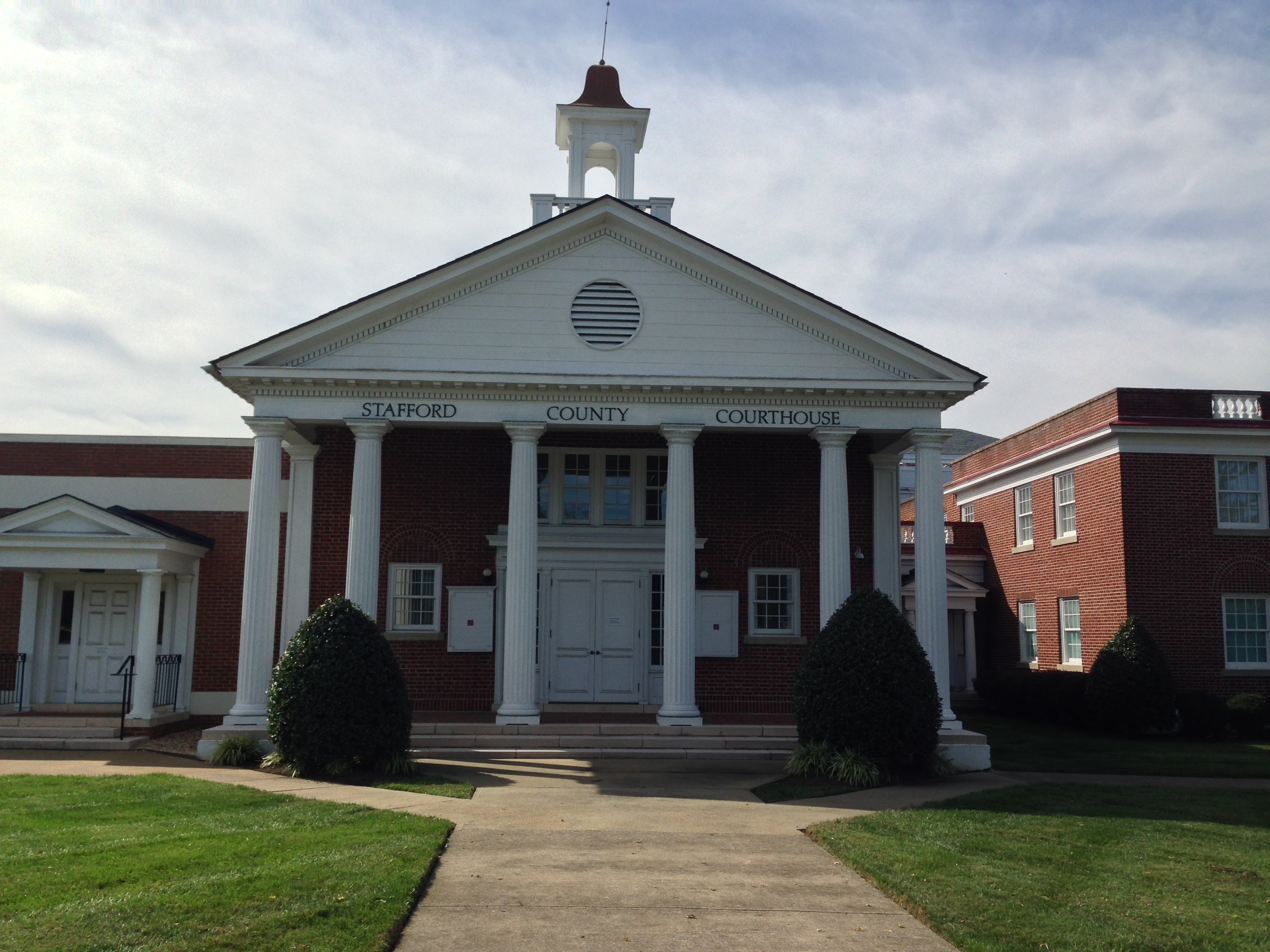
- Stafford County Courthouse

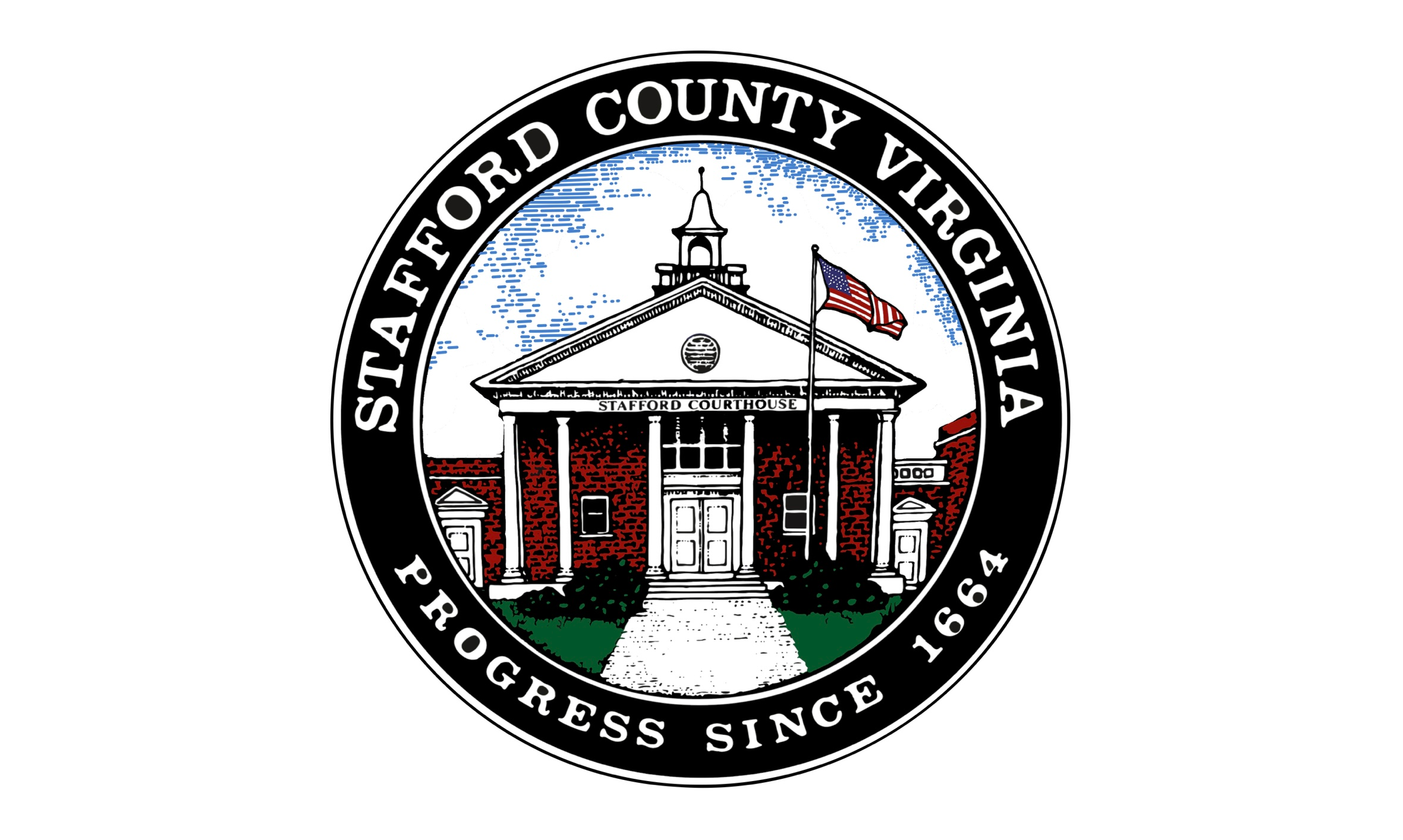
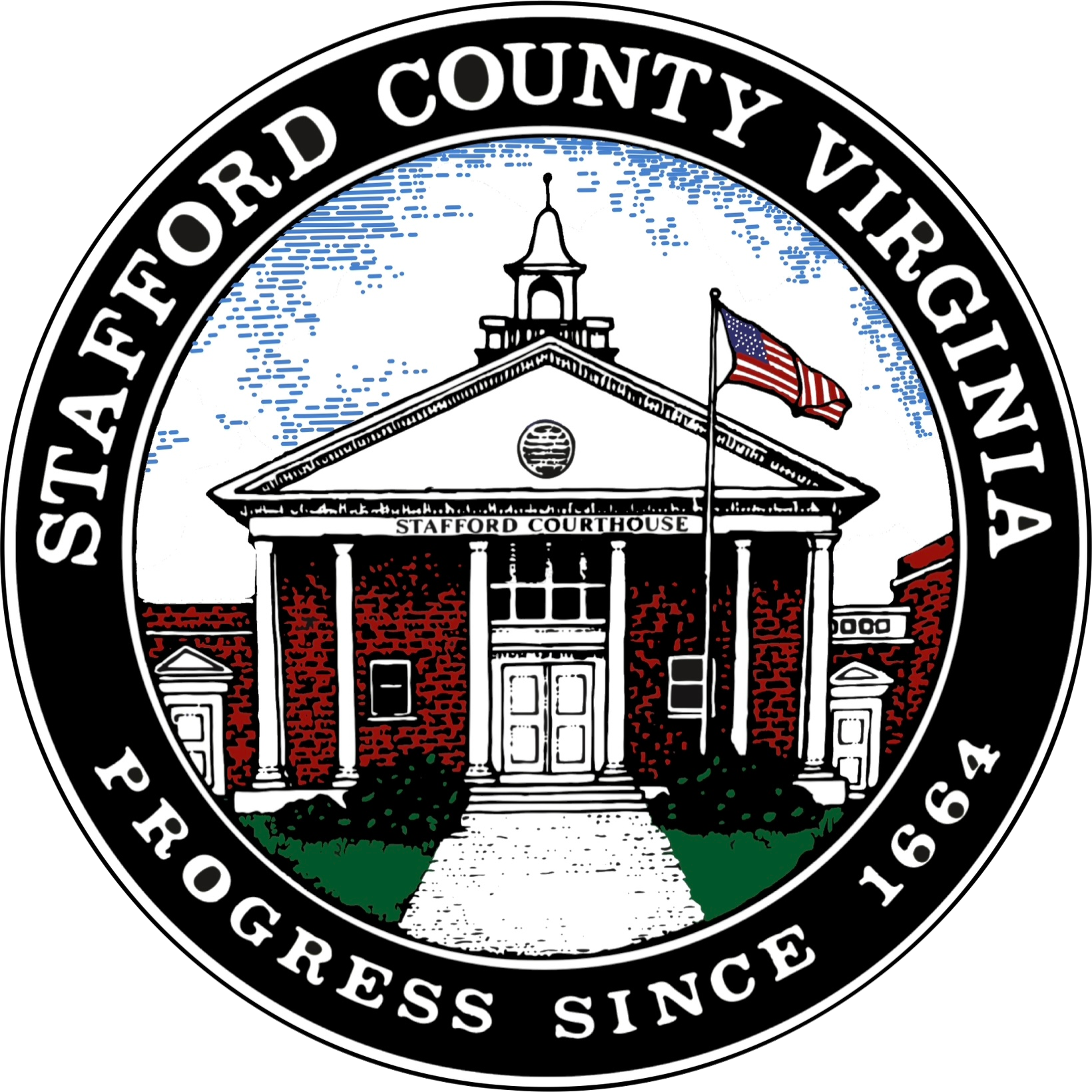
- Flag Seal

- Location within the U.S. state of Virginia
- Coordinates: 38°25′N 77°27′W
- Country: United States
- State: Virginia
- Founded: 1664
- Named for: Staffordshire, England
- Seat: Stafford
- Largest community: Aquia Harbor

Area
  - Total: 280 sq mi (730 km^{2})
  - Land: 269 sq mi (700 km^{2})
  - Water: 11 sq mi (28 km^{2}) 3.9%

Population (2020)
  - Total: 156,927
  - Estimate (2025): 170,803 ▲
  - Density: 583/sq mi (225/km^{2})
- Time zone: UTC−5 (Eastern)
  - Summer (DST): UTC−4 (EDT)
- ZIP Codes: 22405, 22406, 22134, 22554, 22556
- Congressional district: 7th
- Website: staffordcountyva.gov

Stafford County is a county located in the Commonwealth of Virginia. It is approximately 25 miles (40 km) south of Washington, D.C. It is part of the Northern Virginia region, and the D.C area. It is one of the fastest-growing and highest-income counties in America. As of the 2020 United States census, the population sits at 156,927. Its county seat is Stafford.

Located across the Rappahannock River from the City of Fredericksburg and Spotsylvania County, Stafford County is part of the Washington-Arlington-Alexandria, DC-VA-MD-WV Metropolitan Statistical Area. In 2006, and again in 2009, Stafford was ranked by Forbes magazine as the 11th highest-income county in the United States. According to a Census Bureau report released in 2019, Stafford County is currently the sixth highest-income county in North America.

== History ==
For thousands of years, various native cultures succeeded each other in their territories along the Potomac River and its tributaries. By the time of English colonization, there were 32 Algonquian-speaking Native American tribes in the present-day coastal Tidewater Virginia area, including those of the Patawomeck and numerous tribes that were part of the Powhatan Confederacy. The former small tribe, still centered in Stafford County, was recognized by the state of Virginia in 2010.

The Indigenous' first recorded encounter with Europeans in this area was in 1608, with John Smith of the Jamestown Settlement. During a time of recurring tension between the early English colonists and the local natives, the colonists led by Samuel Argall captured Chief Powhatan's daughter, Pocahontas, while she was living with her husband, Kocoum, at the Patawomeck town of Passapatanzy. The colonists took her from Passapatanzy, located in the eastern part of what is now Stafford County, to a secondary English settlement, known as Henricus (or Henrico Town). During her captivity there, Alexander Whitaker converted Pocahontas to Christianity. She took the name "Rebecca" at her baptism. Rebecca/Pocahontas married English colonist John Rolfe on April 5, 1614, in Jamestown. Their mixed-race descendants were among the First Families of Virginia.

The English colonial government of Virginia imposed its own order on the land and peoples. In 1664 it established Stafford County from territory previously part of Westmoreland County (which had been created from Northumberland County in 1653). It was named after Staffordshire, England. As originally delineated, Stafford County included a much larger area than its current borders. As population grew, the following counties and jurisdictions were created: Arlington, Fairfax, and Prince William counties, and the City of Alexandria. It is part of the area now considered Northern Virginia.

George Washington spent much of his childhood in the lower part of the county at his family's home Ferry Farm, which at the time was part of King George County and was along the Rappahannock River across from Fredericksburg. Colonial Forge High School was built on a tract of land owned in colonial times by his father Augustine Washington. George Mason, another Founding Father, also lived in Stafford during his formative years.

Aquia Church, built in 1757, is unusual among local structures for having been designed on the plan of a Greek cross rather than the more standard Roman Cross design. In addition, Aquia Church has a rare three-tiered pulpit; it has been designated as a National Historic Landmark. The Episcopal church continues to be active today.

Stafford County industry and resources were important to the colony and early nation. During the Revolutionary War, the Stafford ironworks furnished arms for the colonial rebel soldiers. Aquia Creek sandstone, quarried from Government Island, was used to build the White House and the U.S. Capitol.

During the American Civil War, the county was part of the battlegrounds, occupied repeatedly by more than 100,000 troops for several years. In 1862, before and after the Battle of Fredericksburg, some 10,000 slaves left area plantations and city households to cross the Rappahannock River, reaching the Union lines and gaining freedom. This exodus and Trail of Freedom is commemorated by historical markers on both sides of the river, in Fredericksburg and in Stafford County. The Battle of Aquia Creek took place in the Aquia Harbour area. Both the Union Army and the Confederate Army struggled to control the strategic Potomac Creek Bridge at various times during the war.

Falmouth, a town bordering Fredericksburg, was the home of late-19th century American Impressionist artist Gari Melchers. His house, Belmont, still stands and is listed on the National Register of Historic Places.

=== 20th century to present ===
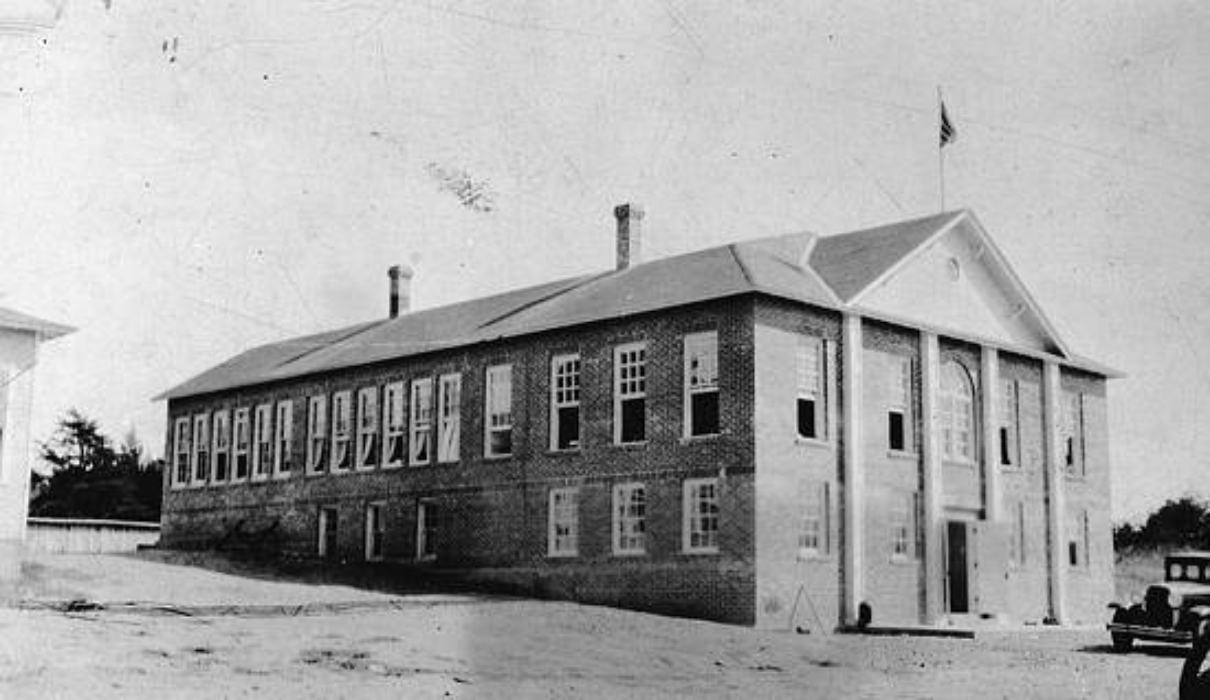
Stafford County Courthouse in 1929

Stafford County has developed into one of the core counties of the Washington metropolitan area and Northern Virginia, home to the seat of government and numerous major defense installations. Marine Corps Base Quantico occupies part of the northern area of the county. The FBI Academy, FBI National Laboratory and NCIS HQ are located on the Stafford side of MCBQ. Many residents commute north to work at these and other defense and federal facilities, as well as private companies in Washington and its environs, via Interstate 95, U.S. Route 1, and the Virginia Railway Express. Stafford County is suburban and home to many Washington, D.C., commuters and workers who work for the federal government. It is also home to many military families because of its proximity to MCBQ. These factors contribute to the high household incomes, high rate of homeownership, and high percentage of college graduates in Stafford County. Stafford County is also one of the few counties in America where the median household income of Black households is higher than that of White households. In recent years, Stafford County has experienced significant suburbanization and population growth as more workers have moved to the suburbs with their families. Thus, many developers are currently active in Stafford County in housing and retail projects.

In the early morning hours of May 9, 2008, a tornado touched down in the southern part of the county, severely damaging about 140 suburban homes.

The county was severely affected by "Snowmageddon," the massive blizzards of December 2009 and February 2010, and received some of the heaviest snow in the D.C. metropolitan area, with about 25 inches of snow in December, and 19 inches in February.

== Geography ==

According to the U.S. Census Bureau, the county has a total area of 280 square miles (730 km^{2}), of which 269 square miles (700 km^{2}) is land and 11 square miles (28 km^{2}) (3.9%) is water. The independent city of Fredericksburg developed at the fall line of the Rappahannock, supporting mills run by water power. To the northwest of there is the Piedmont area. Aquia Creek empties into the tidal segment of the Potomac River at Brent Point. Its location and proximity to Washington, D.C., has caused many federal government workers and commuters to live in the county. Stafford County's location, close to Washington, D.C., and MCB Quanico, are one of the major reasons for the county's suburbanization and growth.

=== Major bodies of water ===
- Rappahannock River
- Potomac River
- Aquia Creek

=== Adjacent counties and independent city ===
- Fauquier County – northwest
- Prince William County – north
- Charles County, Maryland – east
- King George County – southeast
- Caroline County – south
- Fredericksburg – southwest
- Spotsylvania County – southwest
- Culpeper County – west

== Government and politics ==
The county is divided into seven magisterial districts: George Washington, Hartwood, Falmouth, Griffis-Widewater, Aquia, Garrisonville, and Rockhill. The magisterial districts, roughly equal in population, each elect one supervisor to the Board of Supervisors which governs Stafford County. The county operates under the county form of the County Executive system of government, with an elected Board of Supervisors. The Board hires a professional, nonpartisan County Administrator to manage government agencies. The current County Administrator is Thomas C. Foley. Stafford County is currently a battleground county politically which leans Republican. Due to its rapid suburbanization and growth of families, and Federal Government employees from D.C. and being a part of Northern Virginia it has trended Democratic; however, it has stayed Republican at the state and local level. The Board of Supervisors currently has a Republican majority, that is also true of the Stafford School Board (although they are elected on a bipartisan basis). In 2020, Joe Biden became the first Democratic candidate to carry Stafford County since Jimmy Carter in 1976.

Stafford County is represented by Congressman Eugene Vindman of Virginia's 7th congressional district in the U.S. House of Representatives. On the state level, it is represented by Republican Tara Durant and Democrat Jeremy McPike in the Virginia State Senate. Democrats Candi King, Joshua G. Cole and Republican Paul Milde represent the county in the Virginia House of Delegates.

=== County-Wide Commonwealth's Officials ===
Office	Name	Affiliation
Commonwealth's Attorney	Eric Olsen	Republican
Commissioner of the Revenue	Scott Mayausky	Republican
Sheriff	David Decatur	Republican
Treasurer	Michael Sienkowski	Republican
Clerk of Circuit Court	Kathy Sterne	Republican

=== Current Partisan Composition of the Board of Supervisors ===
Board of Supervisors
Position	Name	Affiliation	First election	District
Chair	Deuntay Diggs	Independent	2024	George Washington
Vice-chair	Tinesha Allen	Democratic	2020	Griffis-Widewater
Supervisor	Maya Guy	Democratic	2026	Aquia
Supervisor	Dr. Pamela Yeung	Democratic	2022	Garrisonville
Supervisor	Kecia Evans	Democratic	2026	Falmouth
Supervisor	Darrell E. English	Republican	2022	Hartwood
Supervisor	Crystal Vanuch	Republican	2020	Rock Hill

=== Past composition of the Board ===
==== 2003-2005 ====
Republican incumbent Robert Gibbons from the Rockhill District won re-election after a failed state legislature race in which he lost in the primary. Democrat Peter Fields from the George Washington district won re-election to his second term. Independent Jack Cavilier ran for re-election and won in the Griffis-Widewater district, keeping the Board of Supervisors at a gridlock 3-3-1 partisan split.

Position	Name	Affiliation	First election	District
Supervisor	Robert Gibbons	Republican	1991	Rock Hill
Supervisor	Kandy Hillard	Democratic	2001	Aquia
Supervisor	Gary Pash	Democratic	2001	Garrisonville
Supervisor	Gary Snellings	Republican	2001	Hartwood
Supervisor	Mark Osborn	Republican	2001	Falmouth
Supervisor	Peter Fields	Democratic	1999	George Washington
Supervisor	Jack Cavilier	Independent	1999	Griffis-Widewater

==== 2005-2007 ====
Growth being a main concern of residents four incumbents lost re-election bids. Gary Snelings, a Republican from the Hartwood district lost re-election by 36 votes to Independent Joe Brito. Republican incumbent Mark Osborn lost re-election in the Falmouth district for a second term, to Democratic political newcomer George Schwartz. Democrats in the northern part of the county were replaced by Republicans. Gary Pash, a Democrat representing the Garrisonville District and Kandy Hillard a Democrat representing the Aquia District were replaced by Republicans Mark Dudenhefer and Paul Milde, respectively.

Position	Name	Affiliation	First election	District
Supervisor	Robert Gibbons	Republican	1993	Rock Hill
Supervisor	Paul Milde	Republican	2005	Aquia
Supervisor	Mark Dudenhefer	Republican	2005	Garrisonville
Supervisor	Joe Brito	Independent	2005	Hartwood
Supervisor	George Schwartz	Democratic	2005	Falmouth
Supervisor	Peter Fields	Democratic	1999	George Washington
Supervisor	Jack Cavilier	Independent	1999	Griffis-Widewater

==== 2007-2009 ====
Peter Fields, the Democratic incumbent from the George Washington District declined to run for a third term. Harry Crisp, a Democrat who ran for the George Washington District beat, Tom Coen a Republican who also ran last election cycle against Peter Fields. Jack Cavilier, an Independent incumbent from the Griffis-Widewater district ran for re-election as a Republican and lost to Democratic newcomer Bob Woodson. Woodson made history as being the first black American ever elected to the Stafford County Board of Supervisors. Republican Incumbent Robert Gibbons declined to run for another term. Republican Cord Sterling who worked for Senator John McCain (R-AZ) ran for the Rockhill District and won against a Democrat.

Position	Name	Affiliation	First election	District
Supervisor	Cord Sterling	Republican	2007	Rock Hill
Supervisor	Paul Milde	Republican	2005	Aquia
Supervisor	Mark Dudenhefer	Republican	2005	Garrisonville
Supervisor	Joe Brito	Independent	2005	Hartwood
Supervisor	George Schwartz	Democratic	2005	Falmouth
Supervisor	Harry Crisp	Democratic	2007	George Washington
Supervisor	Bob Woodson	Democratic	2007	Griffis-Widewater

==== 2009-2011 ====
Independent incumbent Joe Brito lost a rematch with Republican Gary Snellings in a three-way race with another independent. Democratic incumbent George Schwartz from the Falmouth District, declined to run for re-election. Former Republican Supervisor Mark Osborn ran for the seat as an independent, in a three race against Democrat Doug Filler, and Republican Susan Stimpson who ultimately won. Republican Mark Dudenhefer won re-election against Democrat Laura Sellers and Republican Paul Milde won re-election against two Independents in a three-way race.

Position	Name	Affiliation	First election	District
Supervisor	Cord Sterling	Republican	2007	Rock Hill
Supervisor	Paul Milde	Republican	2005	Aquia
Supervisor	Mark Dudenhefer	Republican	2005	Garrisonville
Supervisor	Gary Snelings	Republican	2001	Hartwood
Supervisor	Susan Stimpson	Republican	2009	Falmouth
Supervisor	Harry Crisp	Democratic	2007	George Washington
Supervisor	Bob Woodson	Democratic	2007	Griffis-Widewater

==== 2011-2013 ====
Republican incumbent Mark Dudenhefer from the Garrisonville District ran for state legislature and won. Republican Ty Schieber was named Interim supervisor and won a special election to finish out Mark Dudenhefer's term. Democratic Incumbent Bob Woodson from the Griffis-Widewater district declined to run for a second term. In a three-way race former Independent Supervisor Jack Caviler won. Republican incumbent Cord Sterling won re-election in the Rockhill district. In the George Washington District Harry Crisp declined time run for re-election. Bob Thomas, a Republican won the race against a Democrat in the George Washington District.

Position	Name	Affiliation	First election	District
Supervisor	Cord Sterling	Republican	2007	Rock Hill
Supervisor	Paul Milde	Republican	2005	Aquia
Supervisor	Ty Schieber	Republican	2012	Garrisonville
Supervisor	Gary Snelings	Republican	2001	Hartwood
Supervisor	Susan Stimpson	Republican	2009	Falmouth
Supervisor	Bob Thomas	Republican	2011	George Washington
Supervisor	Jack Caviler	Independent	First elected 1999–2007	Griffis-Widewater

==== 2013-2015 ====
The Republican incumbent from the Falmouth District Susan Stimson sought the Republican nomination for Lieutenant Governor of the Commonwealth of Virginia and lost. Meg Bohmke, a Republican representing the district in the school board ran to represent the Falmouth District in the Board of Supervisors and won. Incumbent Republican Ty Schieber lost re-election in the Garrisonville District against Democrat Laura Sellers who ran in 2009 against Mark Dudenhefer and lost. Republican incumbent Gary Snelings from the Hartwood District won re-election. Republican incumbent Paul Milde from the Aquia District also won re-election.

Position	Name	Affiliation	First election	District
Supervisor	Cord Sterling	Republican	2007	Rock Hill
Supervisor	Paul Milde	Republican	2005	Aquia
Supervisor	Laura Sellers	Democratic	2013	Garrisonville
Supervisor	Gary Snelings	Republican	2001	Hartwood
Supervisor	Meg Bohmke	Republican	2013	Falmouth
Supervisor	Bob Thomas	Republican	2011	George Washington
Supervisor	Jack Caviler	Independent	First elected 1999–2007	Griffis-Widewater

==== 2015-2017 ====
Independent Jack Cavilier ran for re-election as a Republican and won in the Griffis-Widewater District. Cord Sterling declined to run for re-election. Wendy Maurer a Republican won the Republican primary, then won a three-way race against a Democrat, and longtime former Republican Supervisor Robert Gibbons who ran as an independent and won in the Rockhill District and won. Republican incumbent Bob Thomas won re-election in the George Washington District.

Position	Name	Affiliation	First election	District
Supervisor	Wendy Maurer	Republican	2011	Rock Hill
Supervisor	Paul Milde	Republican	2005	Aquia
Supervisor	Laura Sellers	Democratic	2013	Garrisonville
Supervisor	Gary Snelings	Republican	2001	Hartwood
Supervisor	Meg Bohmke	Republican	2013	Falmouth
Supervisor	Bob Thomas	Republican	2011	George Washington
Supervisor	Jack Caviler	Republican	First elected 1999–2007	Griffis-Widewater

==== 2017-2019 ====
Republican Supervisor Bob Thomas from the George Washington District decided to run for state legislature. In a competitive Republican Primary he beat Supervisor Paul Milde from the Aquia District, and former Supervisor Susan Stimpson from the Falmouth District. Tom Coen, a Republican candidate who ran twice for the seat was named Interim Supervisor and won a special election as an Independent to finish out Bob Thomas’ term. Incumbent Republican Supervisor Meg Bohmke won re-election in the Falmouth District against a Democrat. Cindy Shelton, a Republican, beat a Democrat and an independent in a three-way race in one of the most Democratic districts in Stafford County. Democratic Incumbent Laura Sellers from the Garrisonville District ran for re-election against Mark Dudenhefer who declined to run for re-election for state legislature. In a rematch Mark Dudenhefer won again to reclaim his seat by 13 votes. Gary Snelings, the Republican incumbent from the Hartwood District won re-election.

Position	Name	Affiliation	First election	District
Supervisor	Wendy Maurer	Republican	2011	Rock Hill
Supervisor	Cindy Shelton	Republican	2017	Aquia
Supervisor	Mark Dudenhefer	Republican	First elected 2005–2011	Garrisonville
Supervisor	Gary Snelings	Republican	First elected 2001–2005	Hartwood
Supervisor	Meg Bohmke	Republican	2013	Falmouth
Supervisor	Tom Coen	Independent	2018	George Washington
Supervisor	Jack Caviler	Republican	First elected 1999–2007	Griffis-Widewater

=== Stafford County School Board ===
Though the school board in Stafford County, and the Commonwealth of Virginia is officially nonpartisan, candidates are endorsed by parties and tend to hold views similar to these parties.

Position	Name	Affiliation	First election	District
Chair	Maureen Siegmund	Republican	2021	Garrisonville
Vice Chair	Maya Guy	Democratic	2021	Aquia
Board Member	Patricia Healy	Republican	1999	Rock Hill
Board Member	Alyssa Halstead	Republican	2021	Hartwood
Board Member	Dr. Sarah Chase	Democratic	2017	Falmouth
Board Member	Susan Randall	Republican	2019	George Washington
Board Member	Dr. Elizabeth Warner	Democratic	2019	Griffis-Widewater

=== Law enforcement ===
The Stafford County Sheriff's Office (SCSO) is the primary law enforcement agency in Stafford County. According to the department, it is the first agency in Virginia to use drones solely for law enforcement purposes.

Stafford County Sheriff's Office
- Abbreviation: SCSO

Agency overview
- Formed: 1664
- Employees: 271

Jurisdictional structure
- Constituting instrument: Yes
- General nature: Local civilian police

Operational structure
- Headquarters: Stafford, Virginia
- Agency executive: David P. Decatur, Sheriff

Website
- Official Website

=== Presidential elections ===
United States presidential election results for Stafford County, Virginia
Year	Republican		Democratic		Third party(ies)	
Year	No.	%	No.	%	No.	%
1880	268	22.79%	908	77.21%	0	0.00%
1884	762	54.08%	644	45.71%	3	0.21%
1888	883	59.74%	595	40.26%	0	0.00%
1892	558	42.40%	742	56.38%	16	1.22%
1896	1,084	63.06%	629	36.59%	6	0.35%
1900	867	57.19%	648	42.74%	1	0.07%
1904	384	55.57%	301	43.56%	6	0.87%
1908	474	53.62%	406	45.93%	4	0.45%
1912	141	20.95%	347	51.56%	185	27.49%
1916	422	48.62%	444	51.15%	2	0.23%
1920	599	56.51%	459	43.30%	2	0.19%
1924	433	46.61%	450	48.44%	46	4.95%
1928	797	64.38%	441	35.62%	0	0.00%
1932	454	38.12%	731	61.38%	6	0.50%
1936	596	47.68%	651	52.08%	3	0.24%
1940	463	36.49%	803	63.28%	3	0.24%
1944	714	50.35%	698	49.22%	6	0.42%
1948	732	46.36%	708	44.84%	139	8.80%
1952	1,411	56.35%	1,077	43.01%	16	0.64%
1956	1,563	58.94%	978	36.88%	111	4.19%
1960	1,447	48.80%	1,494	50.39%	24	0.81%
1964	1,888	43.26%	2,469	56.58%	7	0.16%
1968	2,572	39.68%	1,698	26.20%	2,212	34.13%
1972	5,222	72.39%	1,901	26.35%	91	1.26%
1976	4,451	46.84%	4,900	51.57%	151	1.59%
1980	7,106	58.85%	4,211	34.87%	758	6.28%
1984	10,293	69.63%	4,429	29.96%	60	0.41%
1988	12,234	69.07%	5,380	30.37%	98	0.55%
1992	12,528	50.37%	7,718	31.03%	4,625	18.60%
1996	14,098	54.04%	9,902	37.95%	2,089	8.01%
2000	20,731	60.54%	12,596	36.78%	919	2.68%
2004	28,500	61.98%	17,208	37.42%	278	0.60%
2008	29,221	52.69%	25,716	46.37%	518	0.93%
2012	32,480	53.61%	27,182	44.87%	921	1.52%
2016	33,868	51.37%	27,908	42.33%	4,158	6.31%
2020	37,636	47.27%	40,245	50.54%	1,744	2.19%
2024	40,590	48.59%	41,252	49.38%	1,697	2.03%

== Demographics ==
Historical population
Census	Pop.	Note	%±
1790	9,588		—
1800	9,971		4.0%
1810	9,830		−1.4%
1820	9,517		−3.2%
1830	9,362		−1.6%
1840	8,454		−9.7%
1850	8,044		−4.8%
1860	8,555		6.4%
1870	6,420		−25.0%
1880	7,211		12.3%
1890	7,362		2.1%
1900	8,097		10.0%
1910	8,070		−0.3%
1920	8,104		0.4%
1930	8,050		−0.7%
1940	9,548		18.6%
1950	11,902		24.7%
1960	16,876		41.8%
1970	24,587		45.7%
1980	40,470		64.6%
1990	61,236		51.3%
2000	92,446		51.0%
2010	128,961		39.5%
2020	156,927		21.7%
2025 (est.)	170,803	▲	8.8%
U.S. Decennial Census; 1790–1960 1900–1990; 1990–2000 2010 2020

=== Racial and ethnic composition ===
Stafford County, Virginia – Racial and ethnic composition Note: the US Census treats Hispanic/Latino as an ethnic category. This table excludes Latinos from the racial categories and assigns them to a separate category. Hispanics/Latinos may be of any race.
Race / Ethnicity (NH = Non-Hispanic)	Pop 1980	Pop 1990	Pop 2000	Pop 2010	Pop 2020	% 1980	% 1990	% 2000	% 2010	% 2020
White alone (NH)	36,728	54,761	74,027	87,434	85,587	90.75%	89.43%	80.08%	67.80%	54.54%
Black or African American alone (NH)	2,876	4,241	11,013	21,259	29,492	7.11%	6.93%	11.91%	16.48%	18.79%
Native American or Alaska Native alone (NH)	91	218	387	454	601	0.22%	0.36%	0.42%	0.35%	0.38%
Asian alone (NH)	208	713	1,496	3,545	6,137	0.51%	1.16%	1.62%	2.75%	3.91%
Native Hawaiian or Pacific Islander alone (NH)	x	x	87	149	241	x	x	0.09%	0.12%	0.15%
Other race alone (NH)	65	51	176	293	1,105	0.16%	0.08%	0.19%	0.23%	0.70%
Mixed race or Multiracial (NH)	x	x	1,918	3,952	10,118	x	x	2.07%	3.06%	6.45%
Hispanic or Latino (any race)	502	1,252	3,342	11,875	23,646	1.24%	2.04%	3.62%	9.21%	15.07%
Total	40,470	61,236	92,446	128,961	156,927	100.00%	100.00%	100.00%	100.00%	100.00%

=== 2020 census ===
As of the 2020 census, the county had a population of 156,927. The median age was 36.0 years. 26.7% of residents were under the age of 18 and 11.0% of residents were 65 years of age or older. For every 100 females there were 98.6 males, and for every 100 females age 18 and over there were 96.1 males age 18 and over.

The racial makeup of the county was 57.5% White, 19.4% Black or African American, 0.7% American Indian and Alaska Native, 4.0% Asian, 0.2% Native Hawaiian and Pacific Islander, 6.0% from some other race, and 12.2% from two or more races. Hispanic or Latino residents of any race comprised 15.1% of the population.

81.4% of residents lived in urban areas, while 18.6% lived in rural areas.

There were 50,869 households in the county, of which 42.0% had children under the age of 18 living with them and 20.5% had a female householder with no spouse or partner present. About 16.5% of all households were made up of individuals and 5.9% had someone living alone who was 65 years of age or older.

There were 52,793 housing units, of which 3.6% were vacant. Among occupied housing units, 77.2% were owner-occupied and 22.8% were renter-occupied. The homeowner vacancy rate was 1.2% and the rental vacancy rate was 5.2%.

=== 2010 Census ===
As of the census of 2010, there were 128,961 people, 38,237 households, and 24,481 families residing in the county. The population density was 342 inhabitants per square mile (132/km^{2}). There were 31,405 housing units at an average density of 116 units per square mile (45 units/km^{2}). Due to the rapid suburbanization of the county the demographics have increasingly changed in the past 20 years and will continue to change in the near future as Stafford County continues to grow.

By 2005, Stafford County's population was 72.8% non-Hispanic whites. black Americans were 17.0% of the total population. Native Americans were 0.4% of the county total, Asians 2.3%, and Native Hawai'ians and other Pacific islanders 0.2%. Latinos were 6.4% of the population. This was higher than the total for all of Virginia.

As of 2000 there were 38,187 households, out of which 46.90% had children under the age of 18 living with them, 68.00% were married couples living together, 9.30% had a female householder with no husband present, and 18.90% were non-families. 13.80% of all households were made up of individuals, and 3.40% had someone living alone who was 65 years of age or older. The average household size was 3.01 and the average family size was 3.32.

In the county, the age distribution of the population shows 31.60% under the age of 18, 7.80% from 18 to 24, 33.70% from 25 to 44, 21.10% from 45 to 64, and 5.90% who were 65 years of age or older. The median age was 33 years. For every 100 females, there were 101.10 males. For every 100 females age 18 and over, there were 99.50 males.

The median income for a household in the county was $75,546, and the median income for a family was $78,575 (these figures had risen to $85,793 and $95,433 respectively as of a 2007 estimate). Males had a median income of $47,080 versus $31,469 for females. The per capita income for the county was $24,762. About 2.40% of families and 3.50% of the population were below the poverty line, including 3.30% of those under age 18 and 5.30% of those age 65 or over. Stafford County is also one of the seven counties in America where black households make more than white households. Between 2010 and 2014 the typical black household made $105,628 in the county. The highest out of all the seven counties, while white households made an average $99,533.

== Media ==
Stafford County being a part of the D.C. area and Northern Virginia is covered by D.C. cable news stations. These include FOX 5(WTTG), NBC 4(WRC-TV), ABC 7(WJLA-TV), CBS 9(WUSA), and PBS 26(WETA-TV). Stafford County is covered by northern Virginia newspapers and Fredericksburg newspapers.

=== Newspapers ===
- The Free Lance–Star
- InsideNoVa - North Stafford
- The Washington Post
- Potomac Local

== Education ==
=== Colleges ===
- Germanna Community College
- Strayer University
- University of Mary Washington

=== K-12 schools ===
Stafford County Public Schools serves most of the county. However, places on Marine Corps Base Quantico are zoned to Department of Defense Education Activity (DoDEA) schools.

County high schools include:

- Brooke Point High School
- Colonial Forge High School
- Hartwood High School
- Mountain View High School
- North Stafford High School
- Stafford Senior High School

The zoned schools for areas on-post at MCB Quantico are Crossroads Elementary School and Quantico Middle/High School.

Private schools

- Holy Cross Academy
- Merit School
- Fredericksburg Christian School
- Saint William of York Catholic School
- Fredericksburg Academy
- Grace Preparatory School

Alternative schools

- Phoenix Center for Innovative Learning

== Transportation ==
Stafford County is approximately 40 miles south of Washington D.C. Stafford County is the southern terminus of the I-95 Express lanes, which start in the southern portion of the county north of Exit 133, and go to Washington D.C. The Express lanes originally terminated in the north-central portion of the county; the extension to its current length was fully completed in December 2023.

A 2017 study done by INRIX Roadway Analytics awarded Southbound I-95 from D.C. to the southern tip of Stafford County the worst single traffic hotspot in the nation. A stretch of Northbound I-95 from Northern Spotsylvania County to the Northern tip of Stafford County was ranked the seventh worst traffic hotspot in the nation. Due to booming growth in the county, and Northern Virginia, Stafford County experiences regular gridlock and has one of the worst traffic situations in Northern Virginia, Virginia, and the nation. Thus, the Commonwealth of Virginia has poured big amounts of money in road infrastructure in Stafford County. Major U.S. Routes also pass through, such as U.S. 1, and U.S. 17.

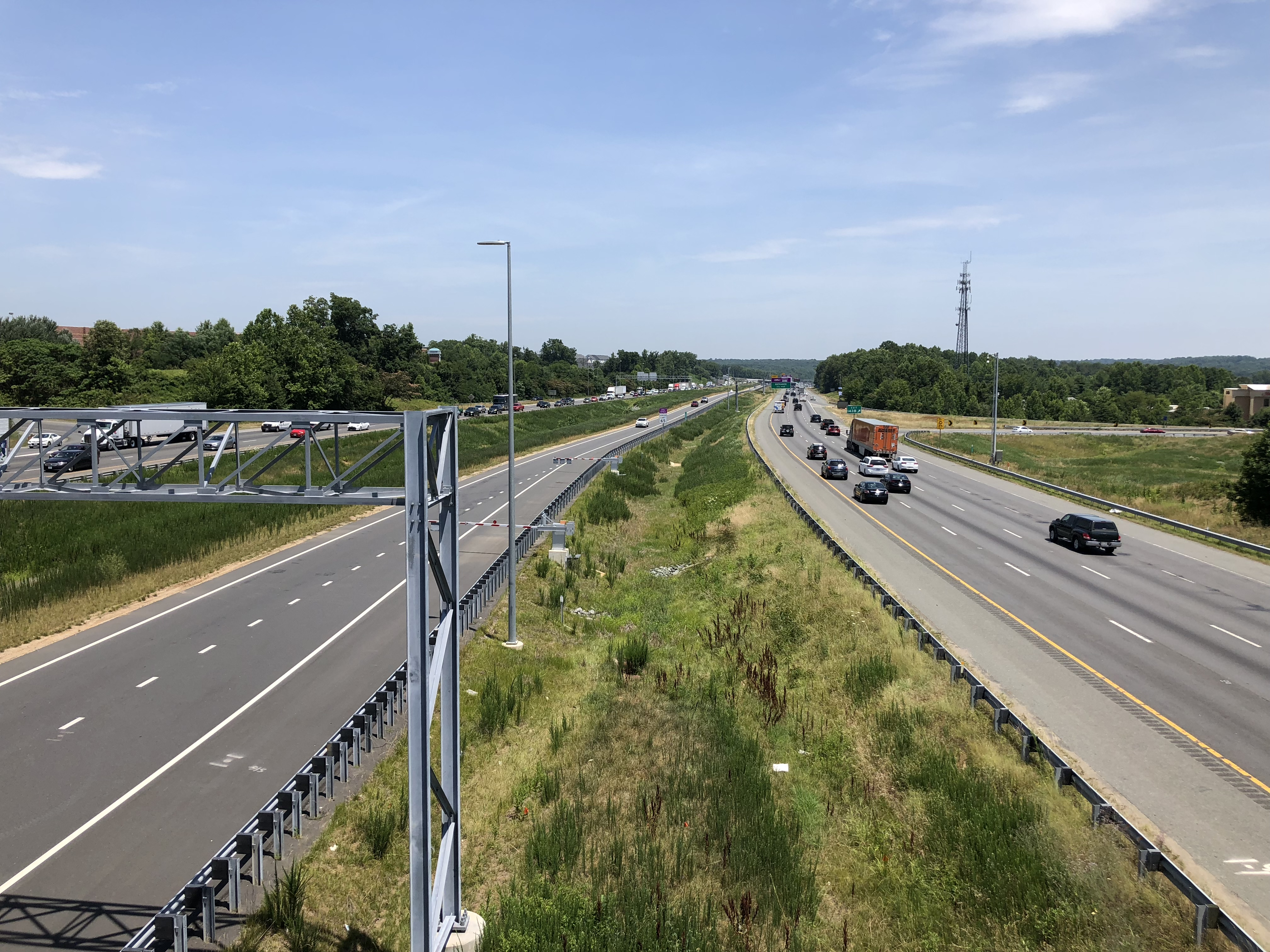
I-95 northbound in Stafford County

=== Major highways ===
- I-95
- US 1
- US 17
- SR 3
- SR 212
- SR 218

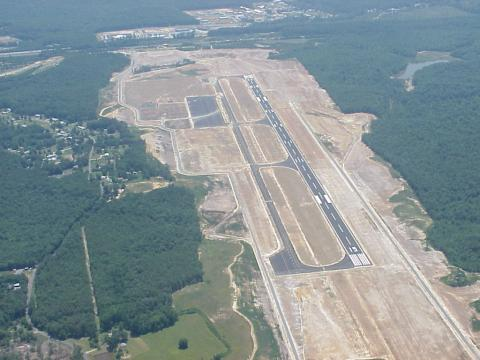
Stafford Regional Airport

=== Mass transportation ===
- Leeland (VRE station)
- Brooke (VRE station)

=== Airport ===
- Stafford Regional Airport

== Points of interest ==
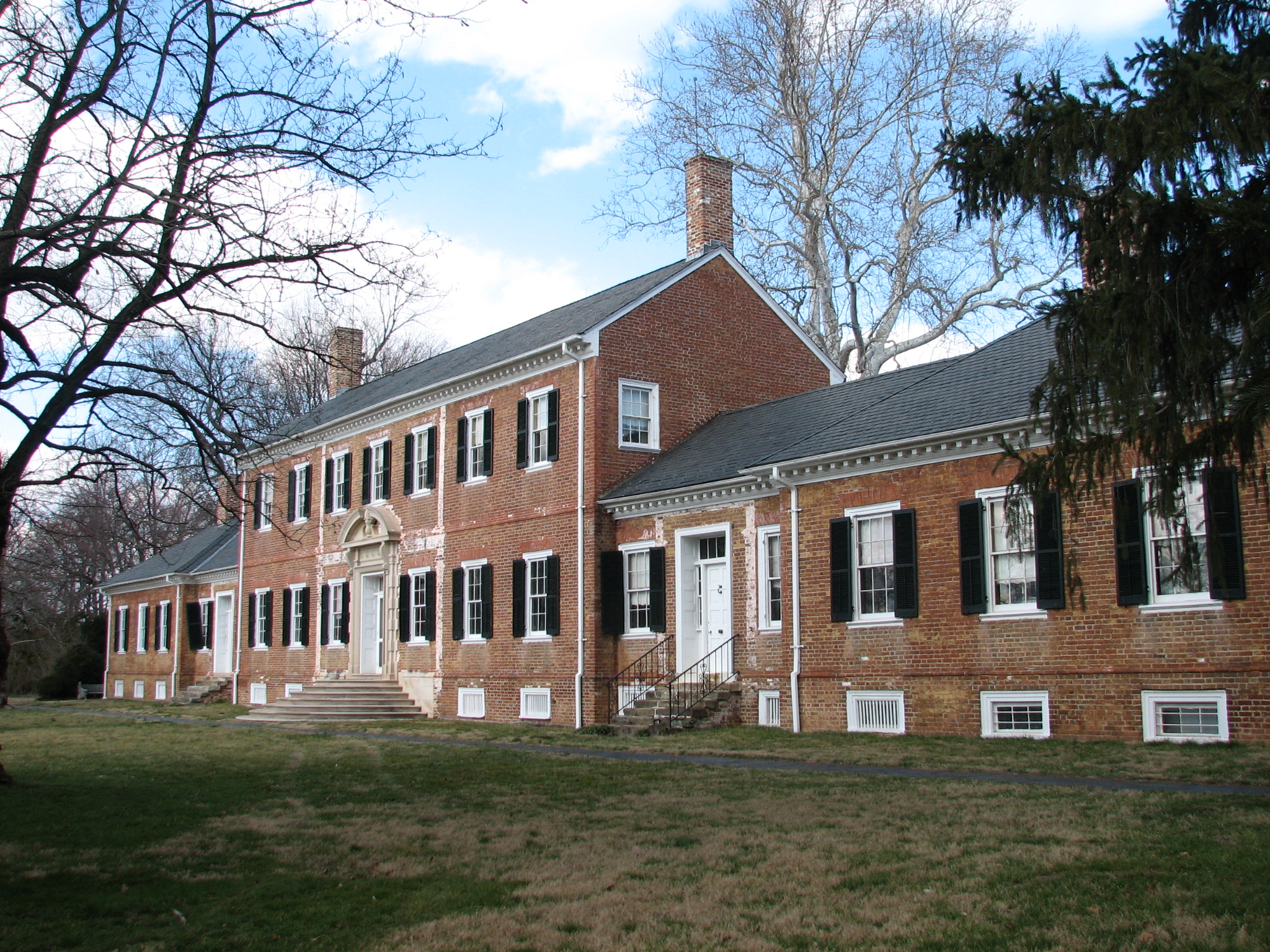
Chatham Manor

- Ferry Farm
- Belmont
- Aquia Church
- Chatham Manor
- White Oak Church
- Central Rappahannock Regional Library
- Aquia Park, Government Island
- Widewater State Park,

== Communities ==
=== Census-designated places ===
- Aquia Harbour
- Boswell's Corner
- Camp Barrett
- Falmouth
- Quantico Base
- Southern Gateway
- Stafford Courthouse

=== Other unincorporated communities ===
- Widewater
- Midway Island
- Widewater Beach
- Aquia
- Brooke
- Garrisonville
- Hartwood
- Mountain View
- Ruby
- White Oak
- Windsor Forest

== Notable people ==
- Palmer Hayden, American painter who depicted black American life, landscapes, seascapes, and African influences during the Harlem Renaissance.
- Erin Cahill, actress
- Peter Vivian Daniel, associate justice of the Supreme Court of the United States 1842–1860
- James Garrard, Governor of Kentucky 1796–1804
- Mark Lenzi, Olympic medalist in diving, 25th (Barcelona, 1992) and 26th (Atlanta, 1996) Olympic Games
- Arlene Limas, Olympic medalist in taekwondo, 24th Olympic Games (Seoul, 1988)
- John Maine, former pitcher for the New York Mets, born in Fredericksburg, graduated from North Stafford High School
- Jessica Player, child actress, graduated from Stafford High School
- Pocahontas, Powhatan princess who resided here with her husband, Kocoum at the time of her abduction
- Gregg Ritchie, former Major League Baseball player and coach, and head coach of the George Washington University baseball team
- Jeff Rouse, Olympic medalist in swimming, 25th (Barcelona, 1992) and 26th (Atlanta, 1996) Olympic games
- Torrey Smith, National Football League wide receiver
- George Mason III, Father of George Mason and member of Virginia House of Burgesses.
- George Washington, boyhood home Ferry Farm is located in Stafford County

== See also ==
- National Register of Historic Places listings in Stafford County, Virginia
- Stafford County Sheriff's Office
