= Widewater =

Widewater may refer to:

- Widewater, Alberta, a hamlet in Canada
- Widewater, Virginia, an unincorporated community in the United States
- Widewater Beach, Virginia, an unincorporated community in the United States
