= Robert Mackey Stribling =

American politician

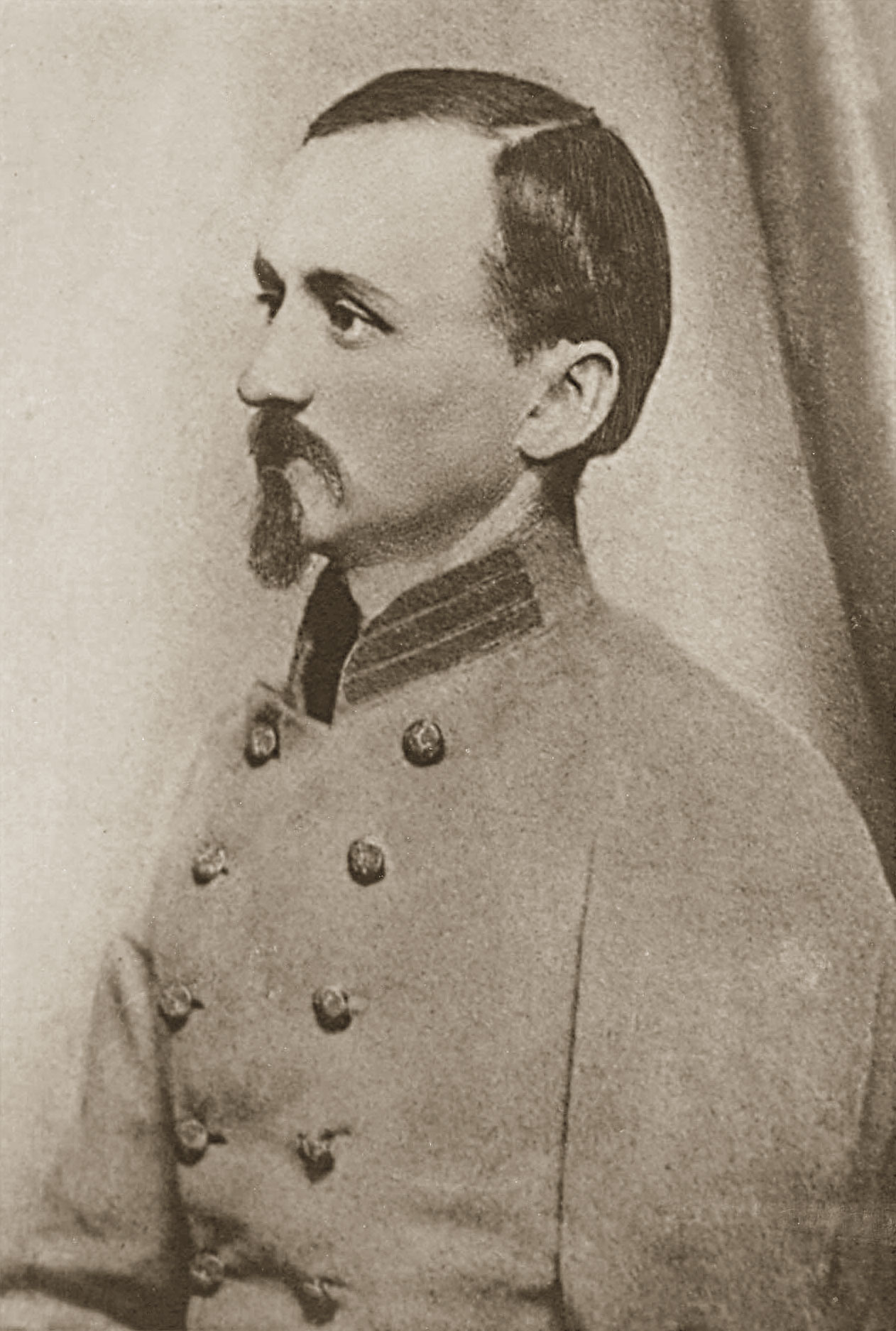
- Born: December 3, 1833; Mountain View, Virginia, United States
- Died: March 27, 1914 (aged 80); United States
- Education: University of Virginia; University of Pennsylvania
- Occupations: Politician, military officer
- Military career
- Allegiance: Confederate States of America
- Branch: Confederate States Army
- Service years: 1861–65
- Rank: Lieutenant Colonel
- Commands: 38th Virginia Light Artillery Battalion
- Conflicts: American Civil War

Robert Mackey Stribling (December 3, 1833 – March 27, 1914) was an American politician and served as an officer in the Confederate States Army during the American Civil War.

== Biography ==
Stribling was born in Markham, Virginia to his parents, Dr. Robert Mackey Stribling and Caroline Clarkson. Stribling received training as a doctor and completed medical degrees at the University of Virginia and University of Pennsylvania in 1854, and 1856, respectively, practicing medicine briefly before the outbreak of the Civil War. He was married to Mary Cary Ambler, daughter of Major Thomas Marshall Ambler and Lucy Johnston, from the neighboring estate of "Morven" in 1857. After her death in 1868, he married Agnes Harwood Douthat, daughter of Robert Douthat and Mary Ambler Marshall of "Weyanoke".

In June 1861, he joined the Confederate Army and was made Captain of the Markham Guard and subsequently the Fauquier Artillery. The artillery was more commonly known as Stribling's Battery. Stribling saw action at Antietam, Bull Run, Suffolk, and provided cover at Gettysburg during his cousin George Pickett's Charge. By the end of the war Stribling was a Lt. Colonel in command of the 38th Virginia Light Artillery Battalion.

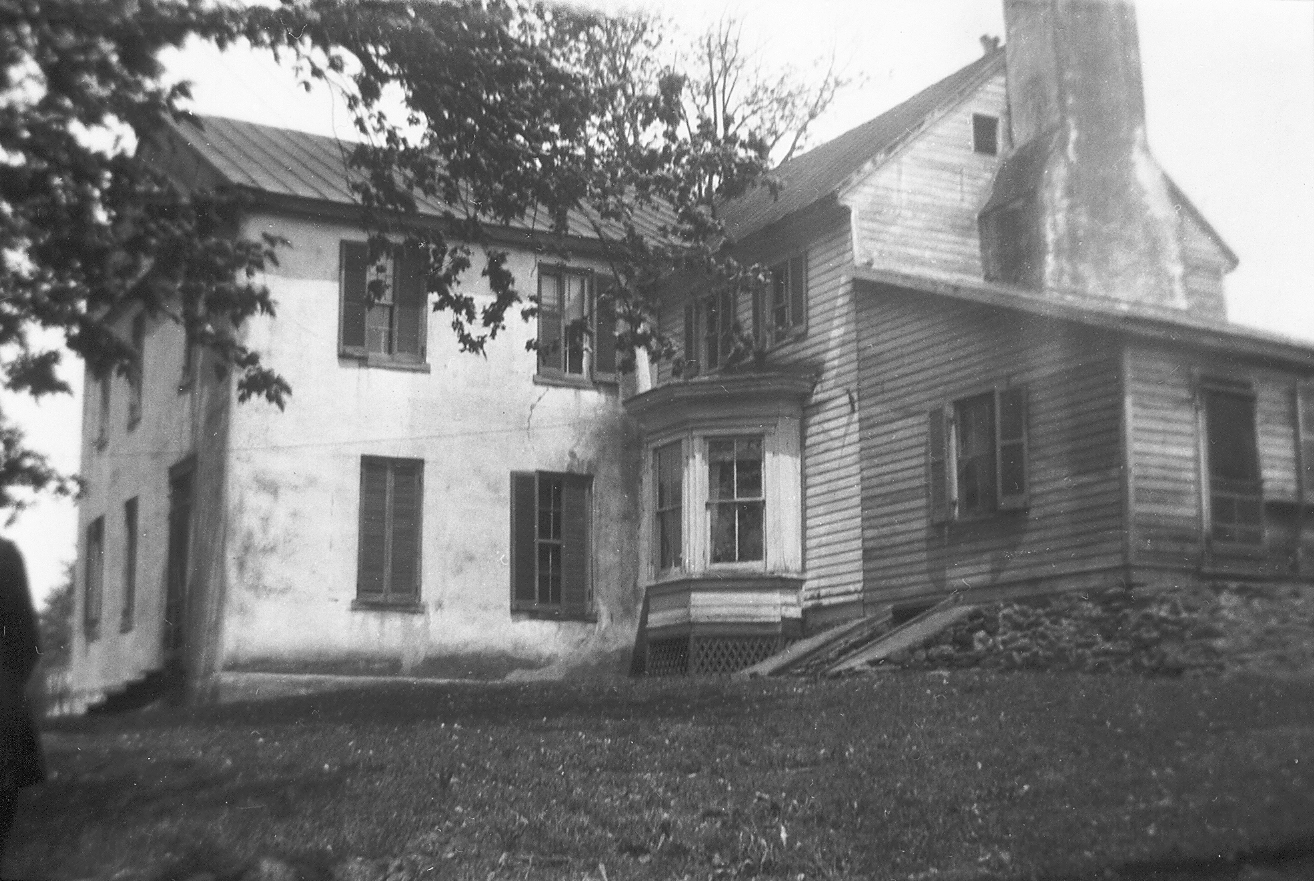
c. 1922. Mountain View, Virginia

Following the War, he returned to Markham and took over the family estate, Mountain View. He was elected as representative to the Virginia House of Delegates in 1879 and served until 1887. During his time in the legislature, he focussed on collecting and saving all Confederate military records. In July 1897, the Woodrow Wilsons stayed at the Colonel's home for vacation.

In 1904 he published a book on Lee's Gettysburg Campaign. Stribling, along with his close friend, Gen. Lunsford L. Lomax, spoke frequently to veteran's groups about the Civil War. The Confederate War Memorial on South Washington Street in Alexandria also bears his name.
