= University of Mary Washington Rowing =

American rowing club

University of Mary Washington rowing
- Location: Fredericksburg, Virginia
- Home water: Aquia Creek
- Key people: Delaney Resweber (President)
- University: University of Mary Washington
- Colors: Navy Blue and Gray
- Affiliations: Mid-Atlantic Rowing Conference

Events
- Clayton W. Waterfield Memorial Cup, Mid-Atlantic Rowing Conference Championships (MARC), Occoquan Sprints Regatta

The University of Mary Washington Rowing team is the club rowing (sport) team of the University of Mary Washington, located in Fredericksburg, Virginia. The program was a founding member of the Mid-Atlantic Rowing Conference in 2008, and has remained therein since.

== History ==
=== Coaches ===
Brad Holdren Phil Schmehl

=== Facility ===
The team practiced at Lake of the Woods until the fall of 2007 when it relocated to the Rappahannock River. After flooding of the river washed out a dock, the program began rowing at Aquia Creek in Stafford, Virginia. At Hope Springs Marina, the crew team practices in the morning, six days a week in the fall and spring, weather permitting.

=== Status of the team ===
In August 2007 the University's administration declared that the program would be recommended for long-term suspension. The team was successfully reinstated through the efforts of alumni, current rowers, and the University as a whole. However, in the spring of 2014, it was announced that the team would be losing its varsity status and would be transitioning to a club program pending student interest. The team is currently underneath "club" status, and reports to the University of Mary Washington's department of campus recreation.

=== Events ===
On November 12, 2016, the team dedicated a WinTech 8+ men's shell to Robert Ericson, a team member who died in April 2014.

== Notable members ==
- Kelley Tice: All-American (2004, 2005, 2006, 2007)
- Kemp Savage: Head Coach Women's Rowing at Eastern Michigan University
- Brandon Kramer: Associate Professor at Kwansei Gakuin University
