= U.S. Capitol Gatehouses and Gateposts =

- U.S. Capitol Gatehouses And Gateposts
- U.S. National Register of Historic Places
- D.C. Inventory of Historic Sites
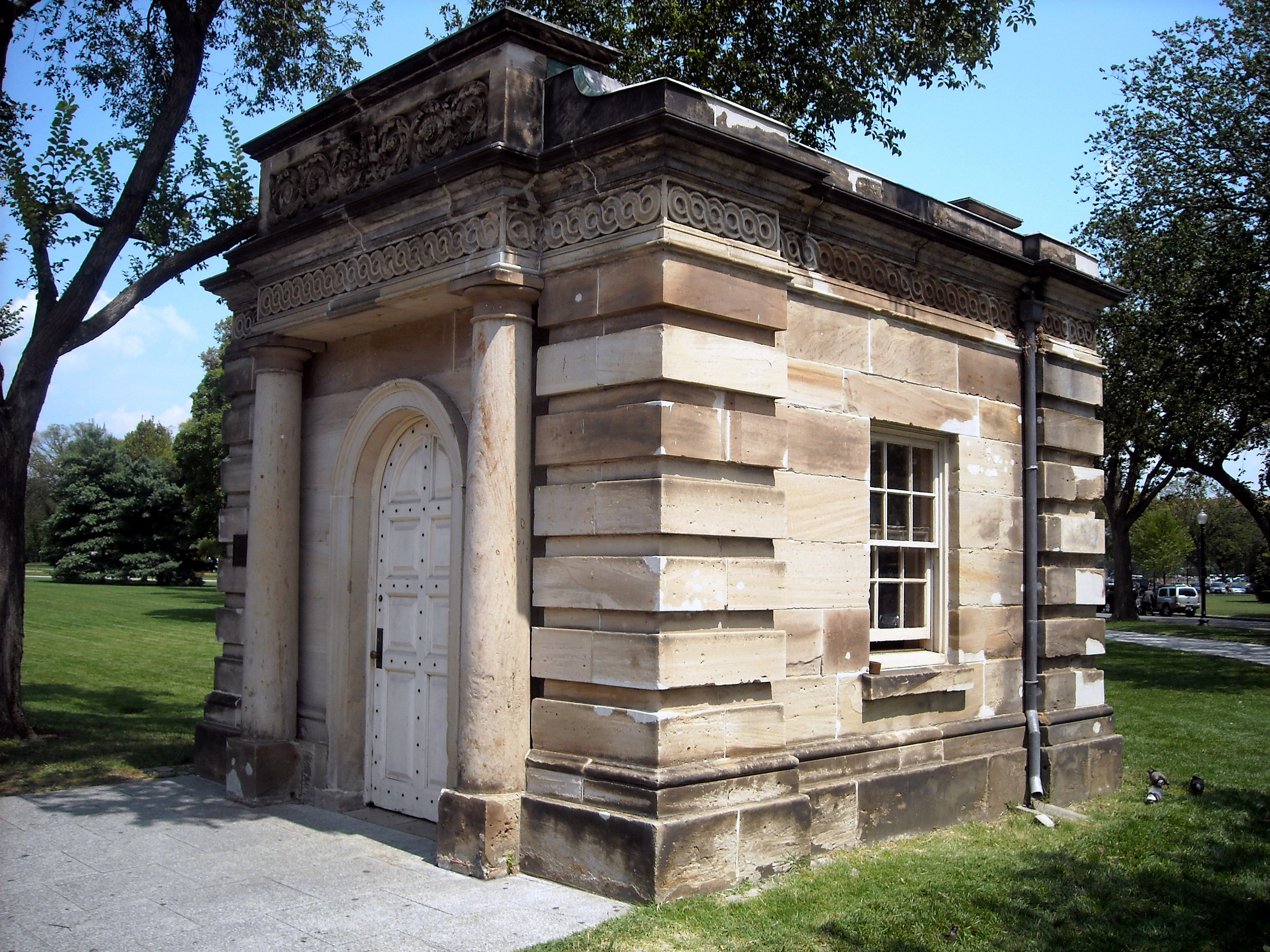
- Gatehouse in 2008

- Location within Central Washington, D.C. Location within the District of Columbia Location within the United States
- Location: 7th, 15th, and 17th Streets, and Constitution Avenue, NW, Washington, D.C.
- Coordinates: 38°53′32.53″N 77°2′02.06″W
- Architect: Charles Bulfinch
- Architectural style: Early Republic
- NRHP reference No.: 73002120

Significant dates
- Added to NRHP: November 30, 1973
- Designated DCIHS: November 8, 1964

The U.S. Capitol Gatehouses and Gateposts — designed circa 1827 by celebrated architect Charles Bulfinch — originally stood on the grounds of the United States Capitol in Washington, D.C. Two of the gatehouses are listed on the National Register of Historic Places in their new locations.

One gatehouse and three of the gateposts now stand at 15th Street and Constitution Avenue within the President's Park South (PPS) historic district north of the National Mall. The other gatehouse is at 17th and Constitution, also within the PPS. Four other gateposts have been relocated to the main entrance of the National Arboretum at New York Avenue NE and Springhouse Road NE.

== History ==
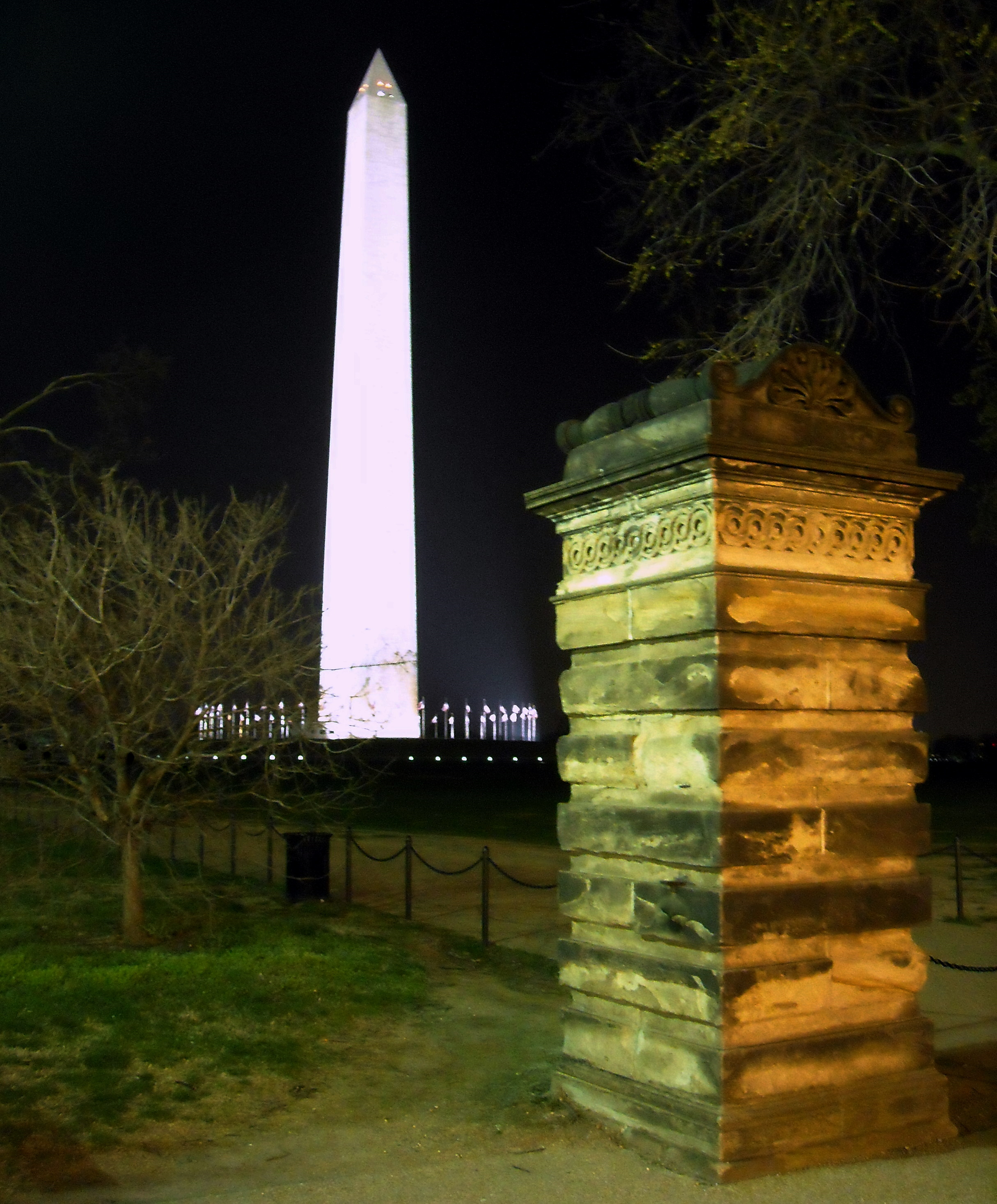
Gatepost with the Washington Monument in the background

Bulfinch designed the structures as part of the original Capitol design. The gatehouses stood at the base of Capitol Hill on the west side at a carriage entrance to the grounds.

The gatehouses were removed from the Capitol grounds in 1874 as part of landscaping renovations designed by Frederick Law Olmsted. In 1880, the west gatehouse was relocated at Constitution Avenue and 17th Street NW, and the east gatehouse at Constitution and 15th. They are placed to flank the White House – Washington Monument axis, which runs roughly along the axis of 16th Street, just south of The Ellipse in President's Park.

The deterioration of the gatehouse sandstone required complete reconstructions in 1938. These restorations were completed under the direction of National Park Service architect Thomas T. Waterman.

Four of the original Bullfinch gateposts from the former fence around the Capitol grounds were moved to Constitution Avenue at the same time as the gatehouses. The posts are twelve feet high and five feet square.

== Architecture ==
The gatehouses are small temple-like stone structures, with rough-coursed masonry (rustication) on the sides and rear and a small Tuscan order porch on the front. The material is Aquia Creek sandstone of a rather poor grade. The east gatehouse bears two high water marks carved into the stone to commemorate flooding in 1877 and 1881.

== See also ==
- History of Washington, D.C.
- National Register of Historic Places listings in the District of Columbia
