= Moy House, Moray =

Ruined mansion in Moray, Scotland

Coordinates: 57°38′56″N 3°39′01″W

Moy House
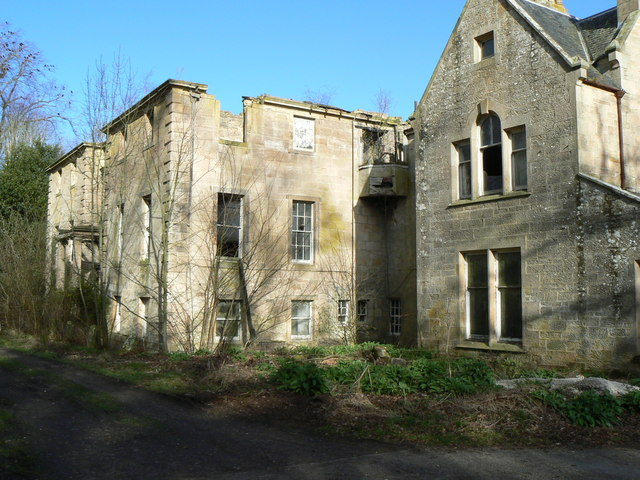
- Interactive map of the Moy House area

General information
- Architectural style: Neoclassical
- Location: Near Forres, Moray, Scotland
- Completed: 1762; 264 years ago

Design and construction
- Designations: Category A listed building

Moy House is an 18th-century country house near Forres in Moray, Scotland. Built on the site of an older house by Collen Williamson and John Adam in the mid eighteenth century for Sir Ludovic Grant of Grant, it was the first building designed by a member of the Adam family to be built in Moray. It was designated a Category A listed building in 1971, and has been listed on the Buildings at Risk Register for Scotland since 1990; ravaged by fire in 1995, it is now a ruin.

== Description ==
Moy House is a ruined mansion, built in the classical style. Its three-storey central block, which is now roofless, has two main facades, one facing east and the other west, with its principal entrance in the east front. Three-storey wings project to the east at either end of the main block, forming a U-shaped courtyard, and two-storey wings projecting beyond these to the north and south.

The building is not inhabited, and has remained in a ruinous state since a fire in 1995. Its dilapidation has been described by Walker and Woodworth as "one of the greatest architectural losses in Moray".

=== East elevation ===
The house's principal entrance is in the east facade. Prior to the bridging of the Findhorn, visitors would have approached the house from the east, following the road from the Findhorn Ferry; the bridge's construction around 1799 allowed carriages to approach the house from the west. The symmetrical frontage, described by Walker and Woodworth as "almost uncompromisingly severe", has five bays, and a round-headed central door surmounted by a corniced doorpiece and flanked by narrow ionic columns. Above the door is an enlarged window, which may have been designed to accommodate a balcony, but this is no longer present.

=== West elevation ===
Also of three storeys and five bays, the west front has a recessed entrance, flanked by two Roman Doric columns, which in the past supported a porch roof. Above this is a Venetian window, with Ionic columns and decorated architraves.

=== Interior ===
Much of the interior has been ruined by the 1995 fire. A cantilevered stairway survives in the hall, with a moulded ceiling above. An ornately moulded ceiling rose is still present in the former drawing room, as is an elaborate fire surround with brass reliefs of a king and prince of Wales, assumed to be George III and his son, the future George IV.

== History ==
The land that Moy House stands on was purchased by John Campbell, of the Campbells of Cawdor, from the Bishop of Moray in 1579. It remained in the Campbell's possession until 1733, when the seventeenth-century 'auld house' that had been built on the site was acquired by Major George Grant. The wings projecting to the east added to the house in the 1750s by Collen Williamson, and in 1862 Grant's nephew, Sir Ludovic Grant of Grant, had the original part of the house demolished, at a cost of £5, and a new central block built. Williamson was the overseer and mason on the project, which was built between 1762-3 to a design by John Adam, after a design by his brother Robert Adam had been rejected. It was the first building designed by a member of the Adam family to be built in Moray.

In 1870, while the house was still owned by the Grant family, Alexander Ross added the two-storey wings to the north and south. The house remained in the possession of the Grants until 1922, since when it has had various owners.

Moy House was designated a Category A listed building in 1971. In 1988, concerns were reported in the local press about the condition of the building, which was at that date occupied in part by its owners, with some of the house rented to tenants. In 1990 it was listed on the Buildings at Risk Register for Scotland, and the local authority issued a repair notice, but the owners asserted that they were unable to afford cost of repairs, which were estimated at £80,000 - £160,000. A plan was put forward to build new properties within the house's grounds, which would raise funds to allow the repair of the house, but these were refused. In 1991, compulsory purchase proceedings were initiated, but these were appealed, and eventually rescinded, in 1992. A new plan for twelve houses to be built on the grounds was submitted later that year, which was accepted, and the building was completed in 1994, and in 1995 a fire broke out in Moy House that reduced it to a ruinous state. External supports were erected to stabilise the fabric of the building, and it was boarded up. Its owners indicated in 1997 that they hope to restore the house and convert it into flats, but building has remained abandoned and boarded up since the fire. The Buildings at Risk Register for Scotland rates its condition as ruinous, and its level of risk as severe.
