= Widewater Beach, Virginia =

Unincorporated community in Virginia, US

Coordinates: 38°24′54″N 77°19′59″W

Widewater Beach is an unincorporated community in Stafford County, in the U.S. state of Virginia. The community is adjacent to Widewater State Park.
