= Collen Williamson =

Scottish Mason

Collen Williamson (b. 1727) was a master mason from Dyke in Moray, Scotland.

== Background ==
He is known for his work on Moy House, a Category A listed building near Forres in Scotland, and for his later work on the White House, acting as chief stonemason on its construction between 1792 and 1795. He remained in America after working on the White House, and died in Maryland in 1802.
