= Fredericksburg Town Hall and Market Square =

Historic building and museum in Virginia, United States

- U.S. National Register of Historic Places
- U.S. Historic district – Contributing property
- Virginia Landmarks Register
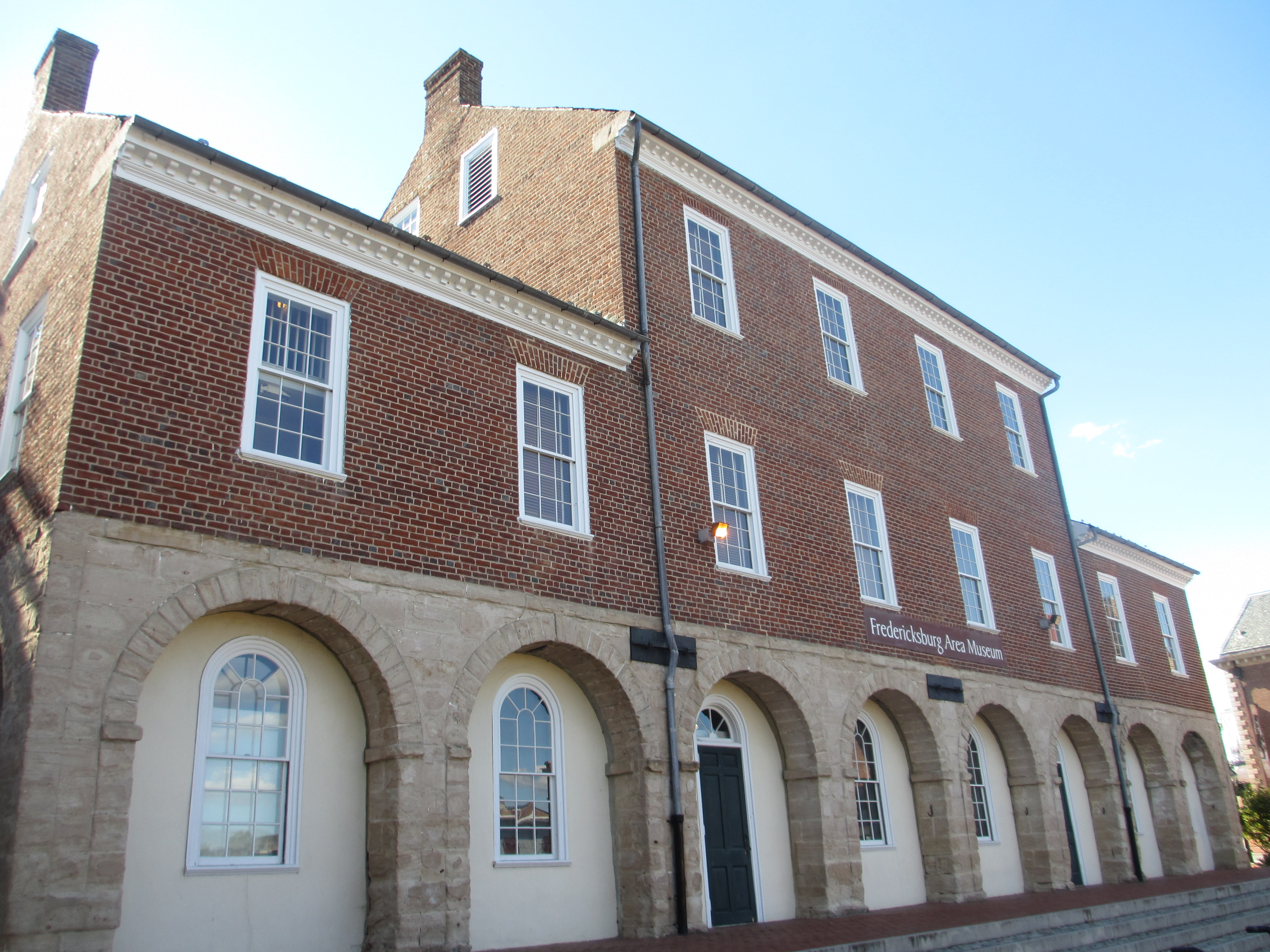
- Fredericksburg Town Hall, September 2012

- Location within Northern Virginia Location within Virginia Location within the United States
- Location: 907 Princess Anne St., Fredericksburg, Virginia
- Coordinates: 38°18′11″N 77°27′37″W
- Area: less than one acre
- Built: 1814-1816
- Architectural style: Federal
- NRHP reference No.: 94000683
- VLR No.: 111-0057

Significant dates
- Added to NRHP: July 22, 1994
- Designated VLR: October 20, 1993

Fredericksburg Town Hall and Market Square, also known as the Fredericksburg Area Museum, is a historic town hall and public market space located in Fredericksburg, Virginia.

== History ==
It was built between 1814 and 1816, and consists of a two-story, five-bay, rectangular center block with flanking one-story rectangular wings in the Federal style. The brick building has stone steps fanning the front of the structure. The building has large sandstone arches in the back that open to the Market Square. Market Square is a paved area that abuts the rear of the building. The building housed city offices until 1982.

It was listed on the National Register of Historic Places in 1994. It is located in the Fredericksburg Historic District.

== Fredericksburg Area Museum ==
In 2020, the Fredericksburg Area Museum re-opened after a renovation. It is exhibiting “Hometown Teams: How Sports Shape America.” from the Smithsonian Institution traveling exhibit service.
