= Aquia Harbour, Virginia =

- CDP
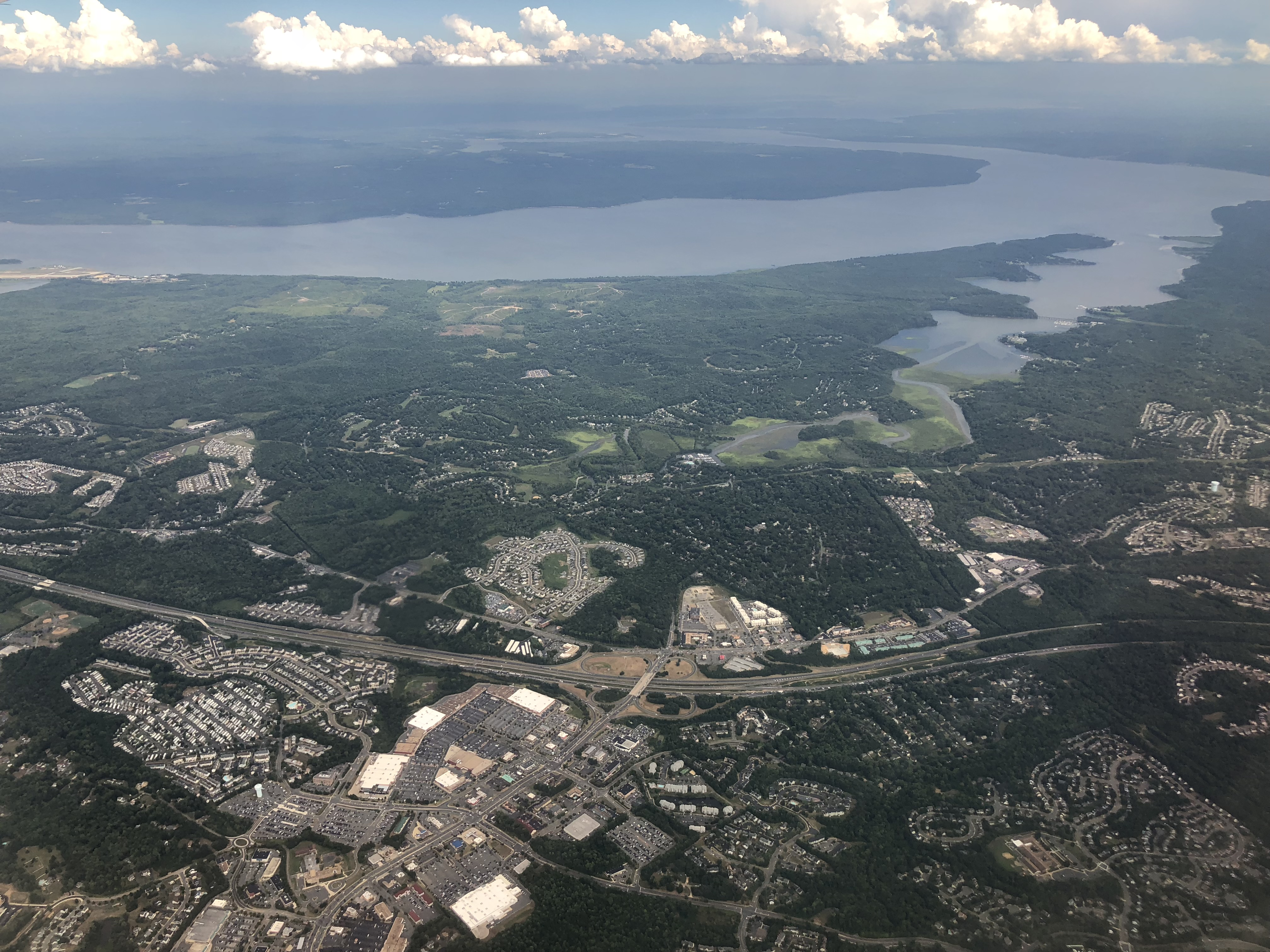
- Aerial view of Garrisonville (foreground) and Aquia Harbour (center) with Aquia Creek and the Potomac River in the background

- Location in Stafford County and the state of Virginia.
- Coordinates: 38°27′31″N 77°23′3″W
- Country: United States
- State: Virginia
- County: Stafford

Area
  - Total: 7.8 sq mi (20.2 km^{2})
  - Land: 7.7 sq mi (20.0 km^{2})
  - Water: 0.039 sq mi (0.1 km^{2})
- Elevation: 9.8 ft (3 m)

Population (2020)
  - Total: 6,836
- Time zone: UTC-5 (Eastern (EST))
  - Summer (DST): UTC-4 (EDT)
- FIPS code: 51-02112
- GNIS feature ID: 1749073

Aquia Harbour is a census-designated place (CDP) in Stafford County, Virginia, United States, 13 miles (21 km) north of Fredericksburg. The population was 6,836 at the 2020 census. Aquia Church, erected in 1757 and now a National Historic Landmark, is located west of the community.

== Geography ==
Aquia Harbour is located at 38°27′31″N 77°23′3″W.

According to the United States Census Bureau, the CDP has a total area of 7.78 square miles (20.2 km^{2}), of which 7.74 square miles (20.0 km^{2}) is land and 0.04 square miles (0.1 km^{2}) or 0.5% is water.

== Demographics ==
As of the 2010 Census, there were 6,727 people, 2,223 households, and 1,914 families residing in the CDP. The racial makeup of the CDP was 84.8% White, 7.7% Black or African American, 0.6% Native American, 2.2% Asian, 0.10% Pacific Islander, 1.3% from other races, and 3.3% from two or more races. Hispanic or Latino of any race were 7.3% of the population.

There were 2,223 households, out of which 38.1% had children under the age of 18 living with them, 75.6% were married couples living together, 7.2% had a female householder with no husband present, and 13.9% were non-families. The average household size was 3.03 and the average family size was 3.24.

In the CDP, 24.8% of the population was under the age of 18. The median age was 40 years. Women made up 50.4% of the population.

The CDP's median income for a household in 2010 was $125,216, and the median income for a family was $128,789. Males had a median income of $86,203 versus $59,698 for females. The per capita income for the CDP was $45,680. About 1.3% of families and 1.8% of the population were below the poverty line, including 2.6% of those under age 18 and 7.9% of those age 65 or over.
