= Public Quarry at Government Island =

- U.S. National Register of Historic Places
- Virginia Landmarks Register
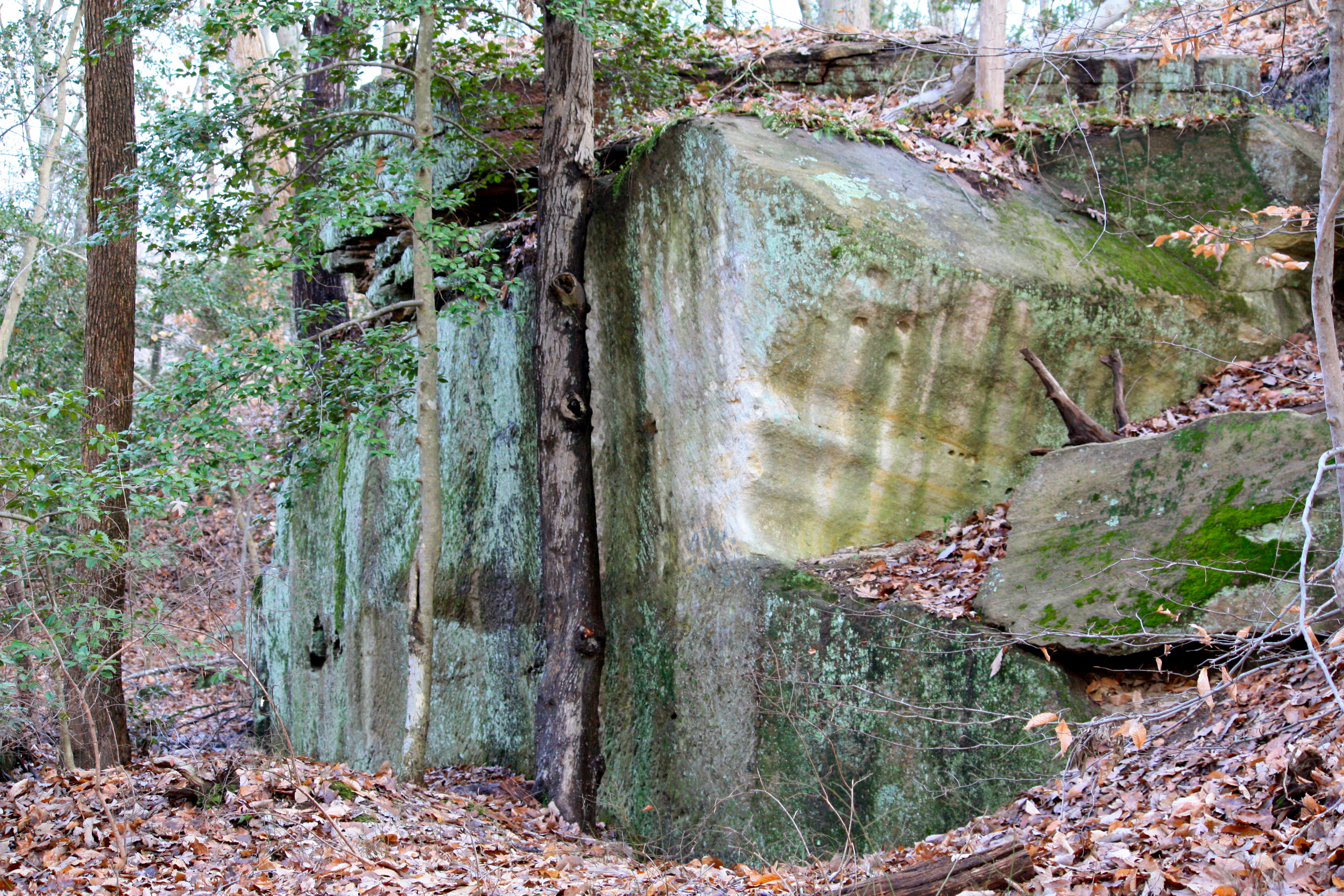

- Location within Northern Virginia Location within Virginia Location within the United States
- Location: Stafford County, Virginia
- Nearest city: Stafford, Virginia
- Coordinates: 38°26′54″N 77°23′0″W
- Area: 17.4 acres (7.0 ha)
- Built: 1791
- NRHP reference No.: 03000457
- VLR No.: 089-0103

Significant dates
- Added to NRHP: May 30, 2007
- Designated VLR: March 19, 2003

The Public Quarry at Government Island in Stafford County, Virginia was the principal source of Aquia Creek sandstone, a building stone used in many of the early government buildings in Washington, D.C., including the U.S. Capitol and the White House.

== History ==
A quarry was established just off the Potomac River at Wigginton's Island on Aquia Creek by George Brent after 1694. It provided stone for tombstones and to houses and churches in northern Virginia, including Gunston Hall, Christ Church in Alexandria, Virginia, Mount Airy in Richmond County, Virginia, and Aquia Church, as well as steps and walkways at George Washington's Mount Vernon.

Washington selected Aquia sandstone as the primary material for use in Washington's government buildings. Acting on the government's behalf, the Wigginton's Island quarry was purchased by Pierre Charles L'Enfant in 1791, becoming known afterward as Government Island.

Use of the stone declined as its susceptibility to weathering was observed, and the quarry became worked out and derelict after the American Civil War.

== Present use ==
The property was sold by the U.S. Government in 1963. It was acquired by Stafford County as a county park and opened to the public on November 6, 2010 with trails and markers highlighting the historical significance of the island. The park has 1.5 miles of trails including an elevated wooden boardwalk through marsh and wetlands, part of the park is handicap accessible. It is a designated site on the Potomac Heritage National Scenic Trail. It was listed on the National Register of Historic Places in 2007.
