= Mountain View, Virginia =

Unincorporated community in Virginia, US

Coordinates: 37.08818°N 80.62034°W

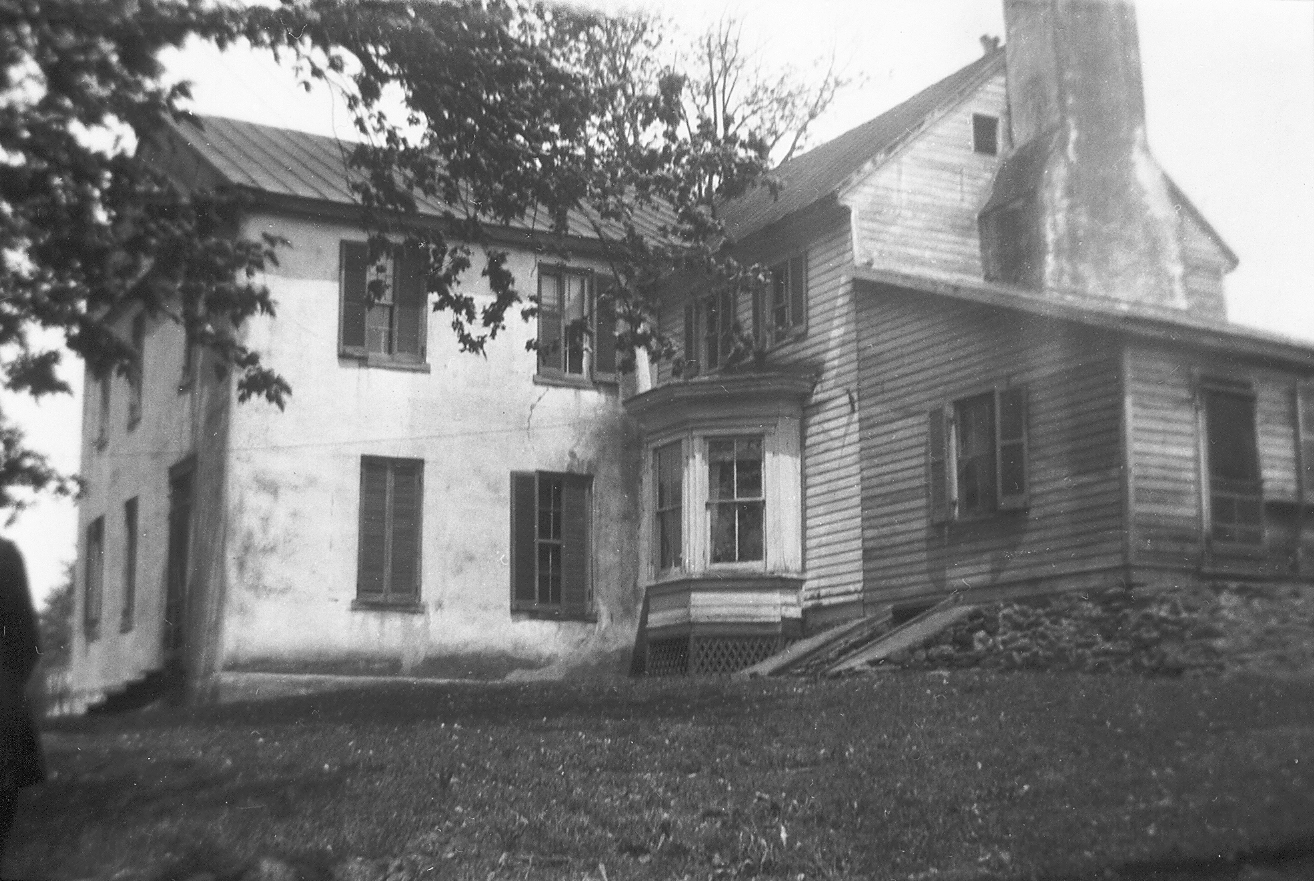
c. 1922. Mountain View, Virginia

Mountain View is an unincorporated community in Fauquier County, in the U.S. state of Virginia.
