= Aquia Creek =

Coordinates: 38°25′05.9″N 77°21′32.6″W

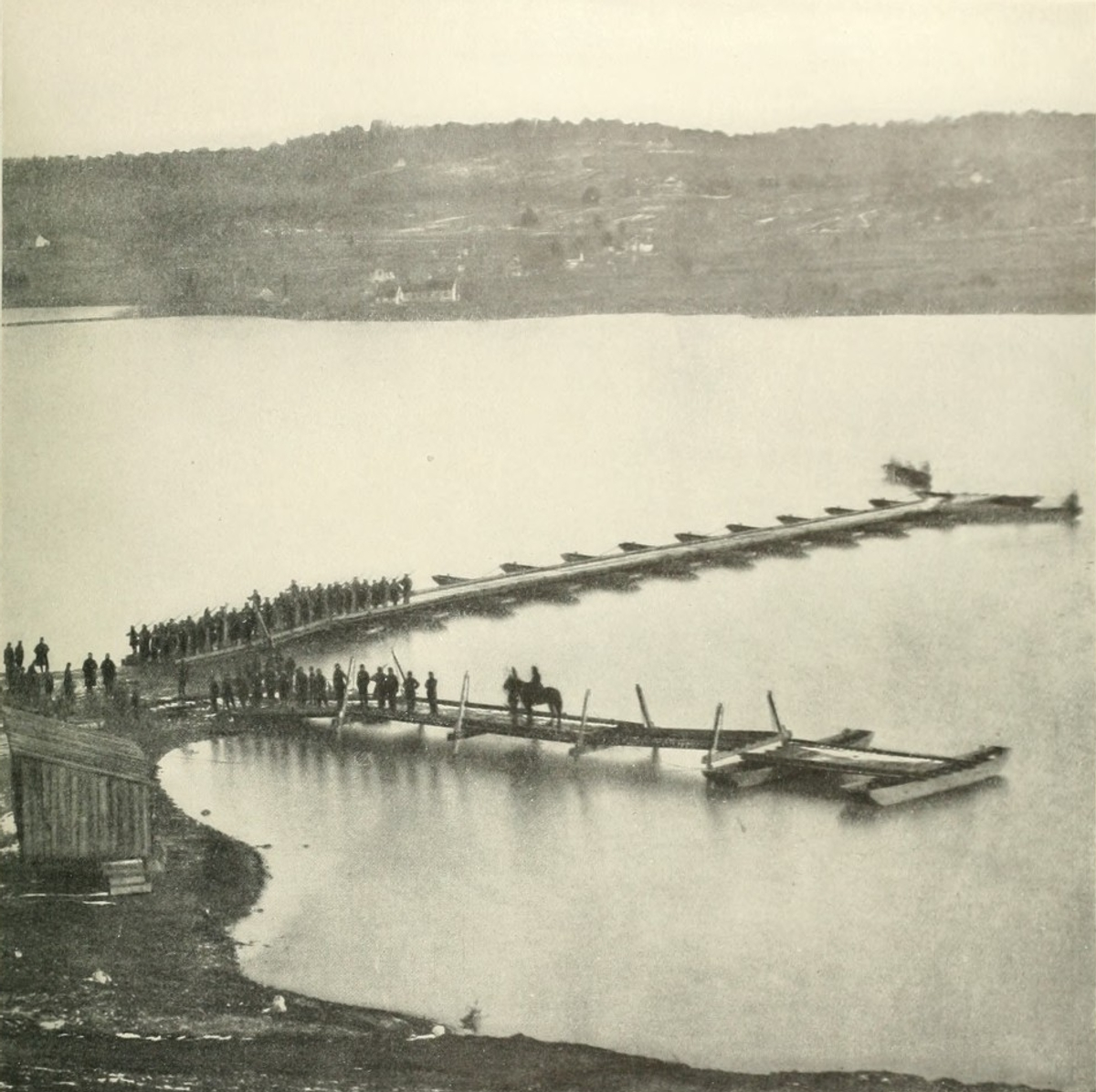
- Aquia Creek Landing under Union control in February 1863 during the American Civil War; this position swapped hands between the two armies during 1861 and 1862, until the Union established a logistical supply point at Aquia Creek for the Army of the Potomac.

Location
- Location: Fauquier and Stafford counties, Virginia, U.S.

Physical characteristics
- Mouth
  - location: Potomac River
  - elevation: 0 feet (0 m)
- Length: 27.6 mi (44.4 km)

Aquia Creek ( /ɑːˈkwaɪə/) is a 27.6-mile-long (44.4 km) tributary of the tidal segment of the Potomac River and is located in Northern Virginia. The creek's headwaters lie in southeastern Fauquier County, and it empties into the Potomac at Brent Point in Stafford County, 45 miles (72 km) south of Washington, D.C.

The White House was built largely using sandstone quarried from Aquia Creek from 1792 to 1799.

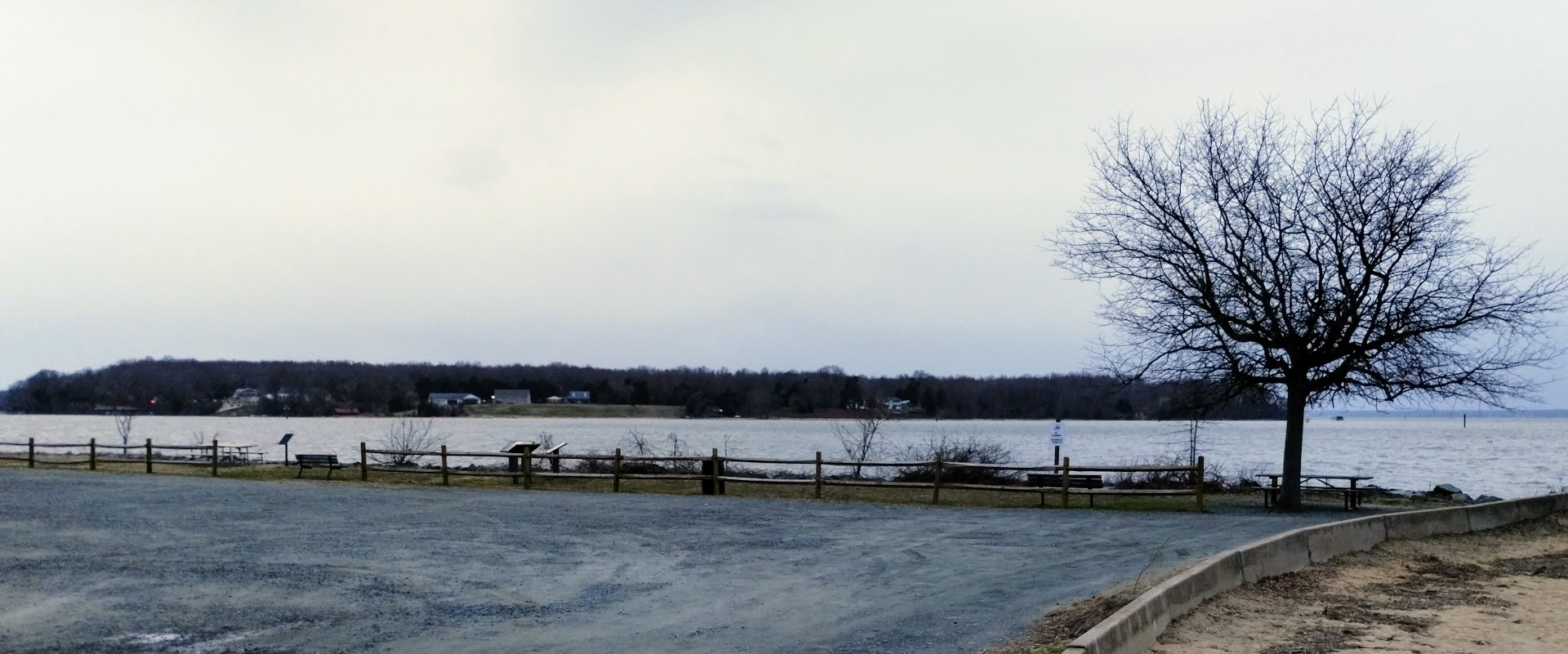
Aquia Creek Landing as it appeared in February, 2024.

== History ==
The Public Quarry at Government Island in the creek served as the source for Aquia Creek sandstone. This sandstone was used in numerous public buildings; the National Capitol Columns were quarried in the early 1800s, and transported to Washington on a barge. The White House, which began its construction in 1799, was built largely from sandstone material that was quarried from the banks of Aquia Creek from the previous seven years (1792-1799).

In an early American Civil War skirmish, the Battle of Aquia Creek, three Union gunships fired on a battery garrison during the Union campaign to blockade Chesapeake Bay between May and June 1861. There were an estimated ten casualties.

== See also ==
- List of rivers of Virginia
