= Aquia Church =

Historic church in Virginia, US

- U.S. National Register of Historic Places
- U.S. National Historic Landmark
- Virginia Landmarks Register
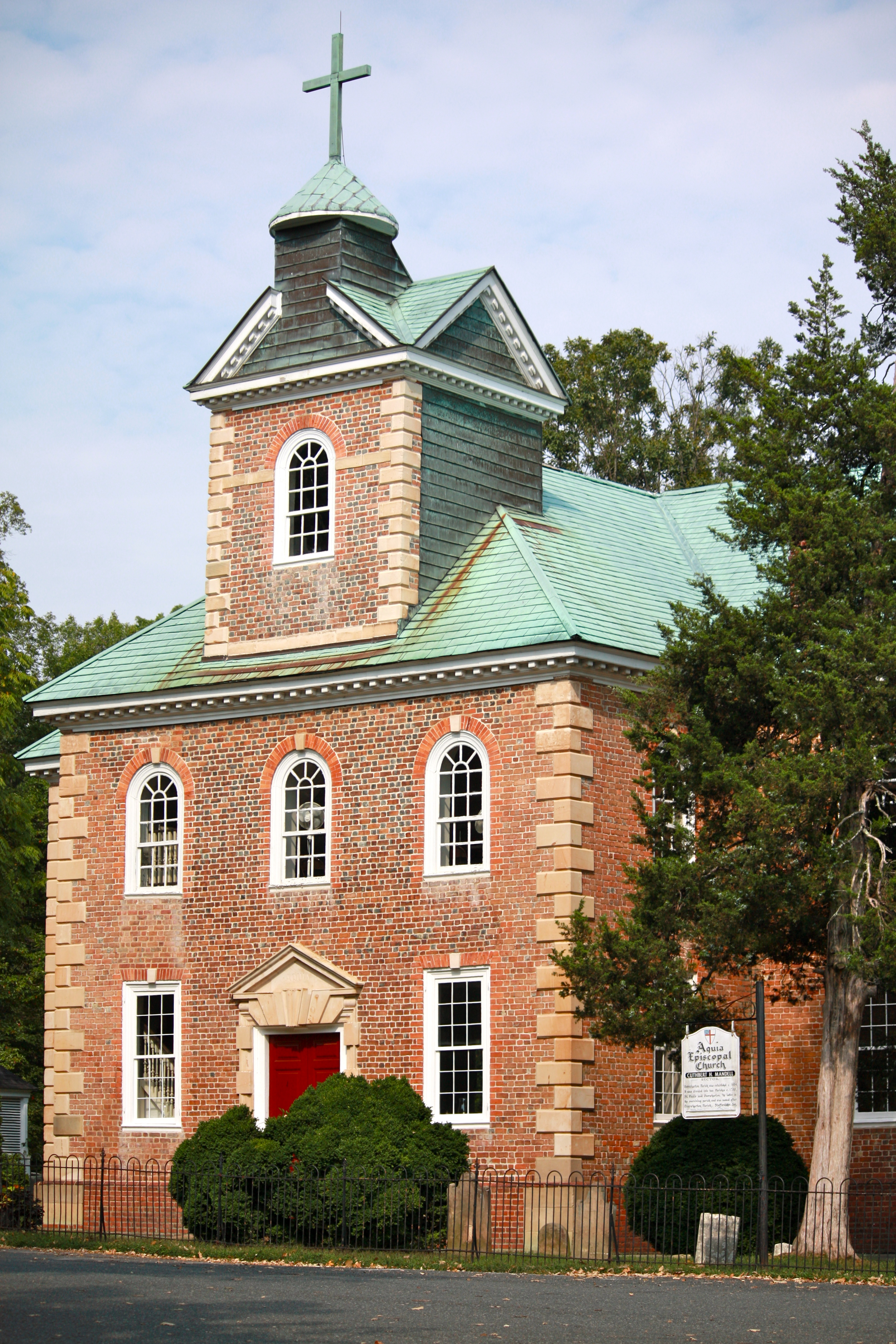
- Aquia Church in 2011

- Location within Northern Virginia Location within Virginia Location within the United States
- Nearest city: Aquia, Virginia
- Coordinates: 38°27′52.56″N 77°24′10.98″W
- Area: 8.5 acres (3.4 ha)
- Built: 1751-1755 (Interior rebuilt, 1757)
- Architect: Mourning Richards; William Copein
- Architectural style: Georgian
- NRHP reference No.: 69000282
- VLR No.: 089-0008

Significant dates
- Added to NRHP: November 12, 1969
- Designated NHL: July 5, 1991
- Designated VLR: May 13, 1969

Aquia Church is a historic church and congregation at 2938 Richmond Highway (U.S. Route 1 at Virginia State Route 610) in Stafford, Virginia, US. It is an Episcopal congregation founded in 1711, that meets in an architecturally exceptional Georgian brick building that was built in the 1750s. The building was designated a National Historic Landmark in 1991 for its architectural importance. It maintains an active congregation with a variety of programs and outreach to the community.

== Description and history ==
Aquia Church is located west of Aquia Harbour and north of Stafford, at the northeast corner of US 1 and the end of SR 610, just east of Interstate 95. It is set back from the road on a wooded hilltop. It is a two-story cruciform structure, built out of bricks laid in Flemish bond, with sandstone trim elements. The roof is hipped, and a short square tower rises from one end, topped by a cross-gabled roof, circular cupola, and cross. The building corners are quoined in stone, and the first-floor windows are set in rectangular openings with keystones. The second-floor windows are round-arched, also with stone keystones at the tops. The building is set on a 20th-century concrete foundation with a brick water table, replacing its original foundation in 1915-16.

The building's cruciform plan is not common for colonial period churches, and it is also rare for churches from that period to have a full second story. The church was built on the site of two earlier Anglican churches of Overwharton Parish, which was formed before 1680 by the division of Potomac Parish and received its first permanent minister in 1711. Its exterior was built 1751-55, using sandstone quarried nearby for the trim. In 1757 the building was gutted by fire, and was rebuilt in the surviving shell. The interior is largely original, and has richly detailed woodwork, including one of the finest known colonial period pedimented altarpieces in the state.

== See also ==
- List of National Historic Landmarks in Virginia
- National Register of Historic Places listings in Stafford County, Virginia
