= Hapka =

Hapka is a surname. Notable people with the surname include:

- Dustin Hapka (born 1983), American stock car racing driver
- Mark Hapka (born 1982), American actor
- Petr Hapka (1944–2014), Czech composer
