= Stafford Training School =

Historic school building in Virginia, US

- U.S. National Register of Historic Places
- Virginia Landmarks Register
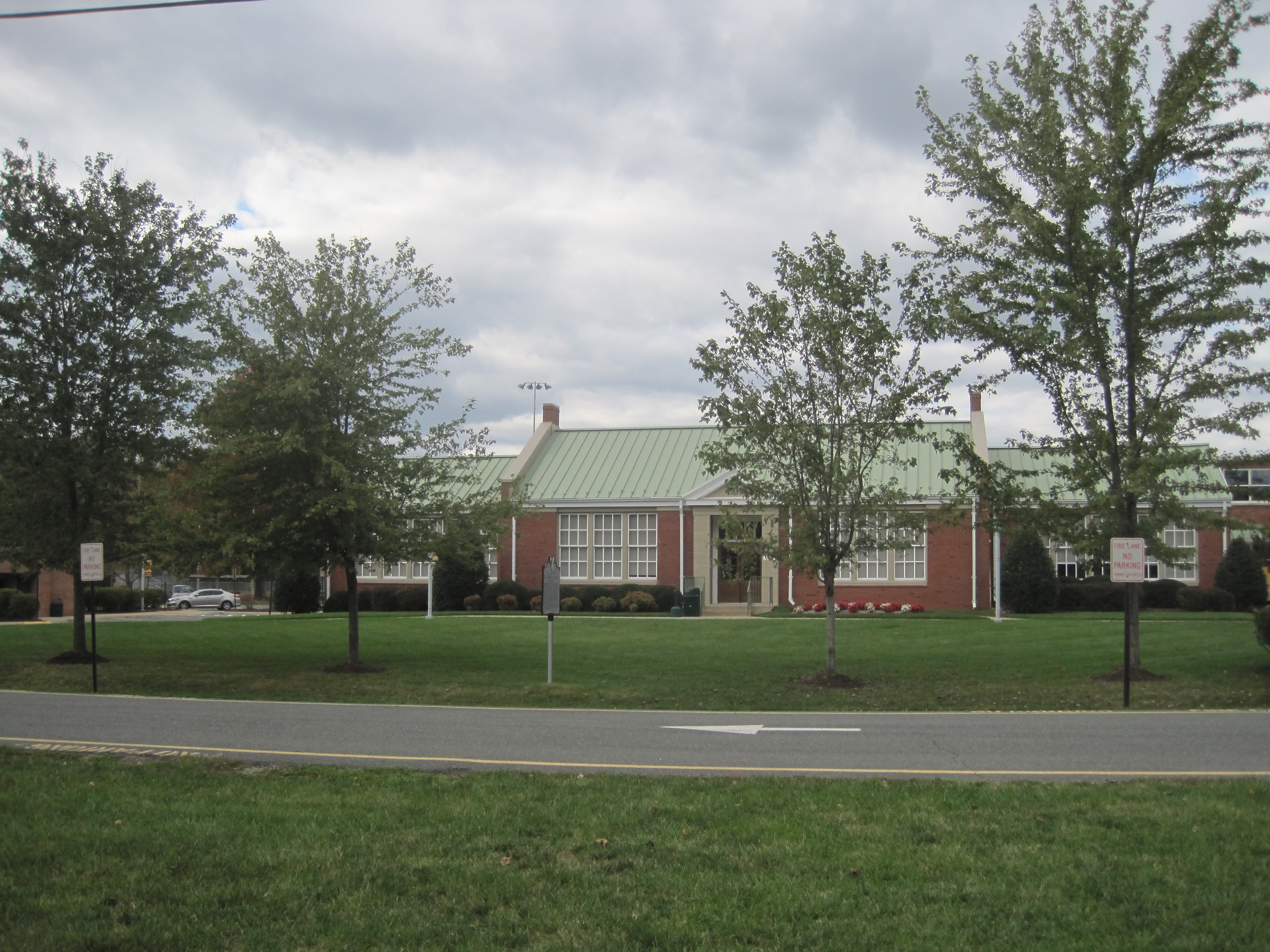

- Location within Northern Virginia Location within Virginia Location within the United States
- Location: 1739 Jefferson Davis Highway, Stafford, Virginia
- Coordinates: 38°24′16″N 77°25′13″W
- Area: 8.16 acres (3.30 ha)
- Built: c. 1939, 1943, 1954, 1958, 1960
- Built by: Public Works Administration
- Architectural style: Colonial Revival
- NRHP reference No.: 12001272
- VLR No.: 089-0247

Significant dates
- Added to NRHP: February 5, 2013
- Designated VLR: December 13, 2012

Stafford Training School, also known as H.H. Poole Junior High School, H.H. Poole High School: Stafford Vocational Annex, Rowser Educational Center, and the Rowser Building, is a historic school building for African American students located at Stafford, Stafford County, Virginia. The original section was built in 1939, and enlarged in 1943, 1954, 1958, and 1960. After the 1954 addition, the facility consisted of: eight standard classrooms, a principal's office, a clinic and teacher's lounge, library, homemaking department, cafeteria kitchen, combination auditorium-gymnasium, and modern (at the time) rest rooms. Total enrollment for the 1955-1956 session was 228 and the value of the school plant was $200,000.

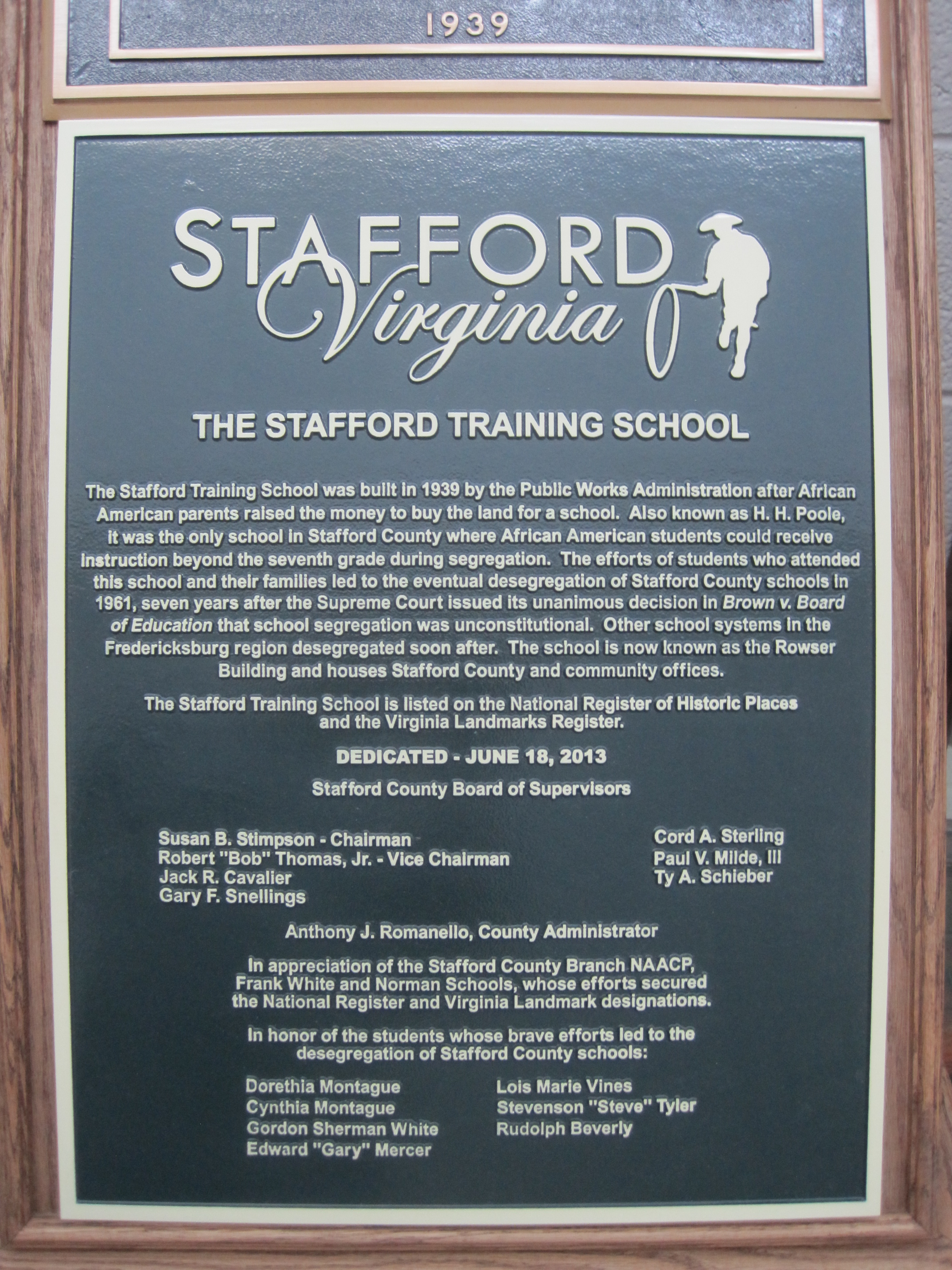
Stafford Training School historical plaque

The 1954 enlargement cost more than $100,000 and was funded with a State School Construction Funds grant and cash appropriated from the County Board of Supervisors. The 1960 enlargement added the two story cafeteria and home economics department and was built by Stafford school bus drivers.

It consists of a one-story, three-bay, rectangular main block, flanked by one-story brick wings in the Colonial Revival style. It is built of cinderblock clad in brick veneer and covered with a standing-seam metal roof. Also on the property are the contributing baseball field (c. 1940) and a diversionary drainage ditch (1939). The school was built by the Public Works Administration and was the only African American high school in Stafford County operating during the Civil Rights Movement. For a number of years, before the 1950 expansions, 11th and 12th grade students were transported to The Walker-Grant High School in Fredericksburg, because the other high school in the county was for whites only. The Stafford County School Board paid tuition and transportation to attend this accredited high school at Fredericksburg.

Two students from the school, Doretha and Cynthia Montague, entered Stafford Elementary School, an all-white institution, on September 5, 1961; this was the beginning of the desegregation of school systems in the Fredericksburg area.

The former school building was listed on the National Register of Historic Places in 2013. On June 18, 2013, an historical plaque was unveiled providing a brief history of the building. It is displayed inside. Another sign, this one a state historic marker, was erected in front of the building by the Virginia Department of Historic Resources in 2014.
