= 2014 NASCAR Camping World Truck Series =

American motorsport season

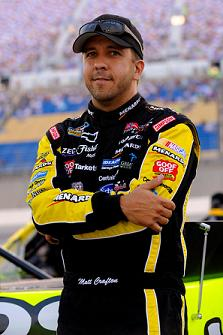
Matt Crafton, the 2014 Camping World Truck Series champion. Crafton became the first driver in series history to win back-to-back championships.

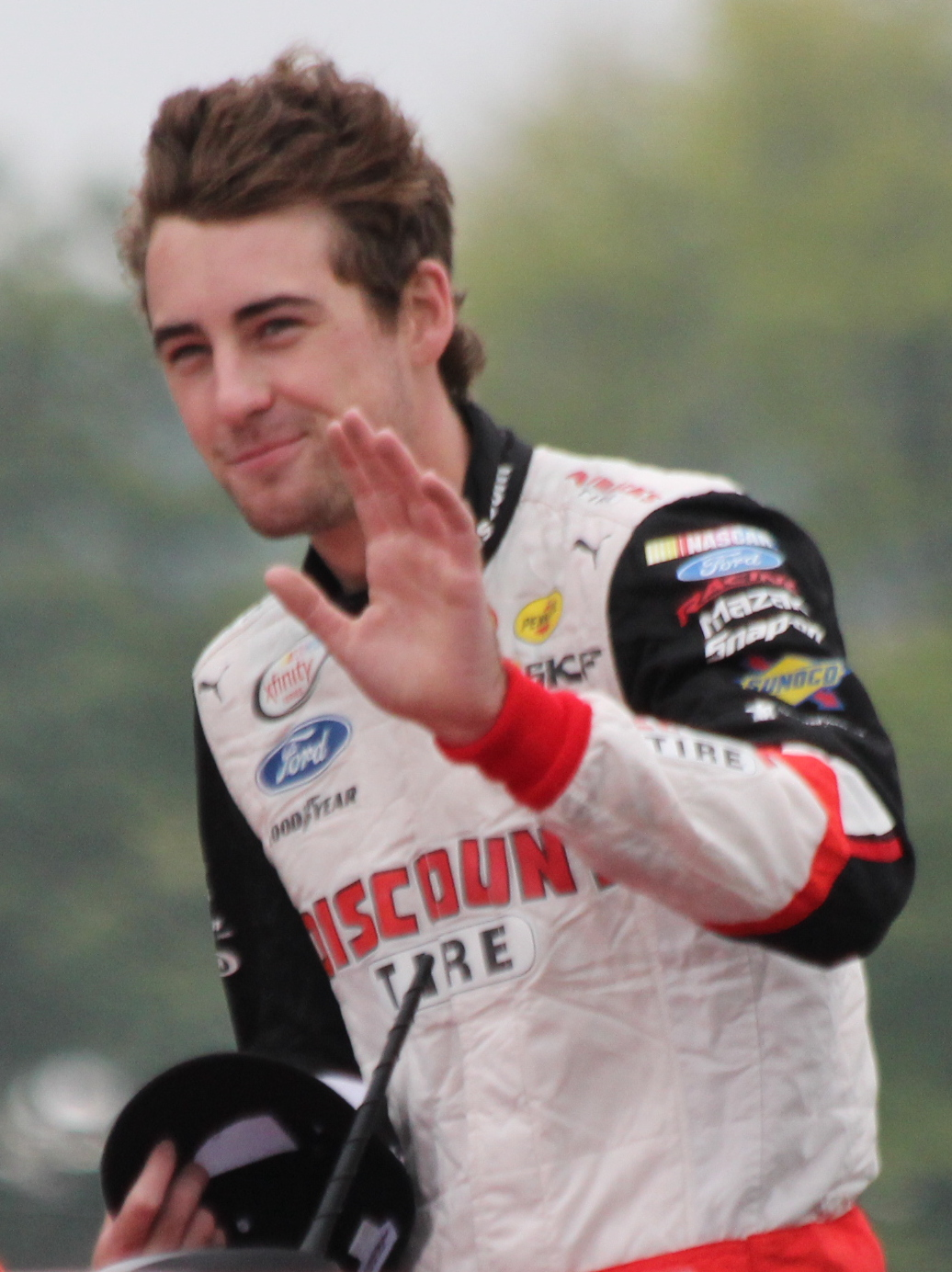
Ryan Blaney, shown here in 2015, finished second behind Crafton.

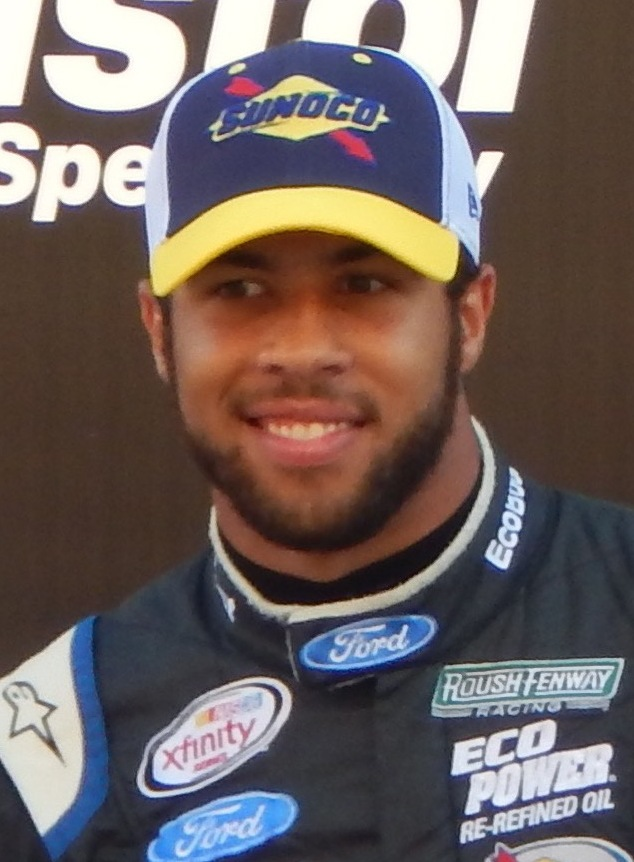
Bubba Wallace, shown here in 2015, finished third in the championship.

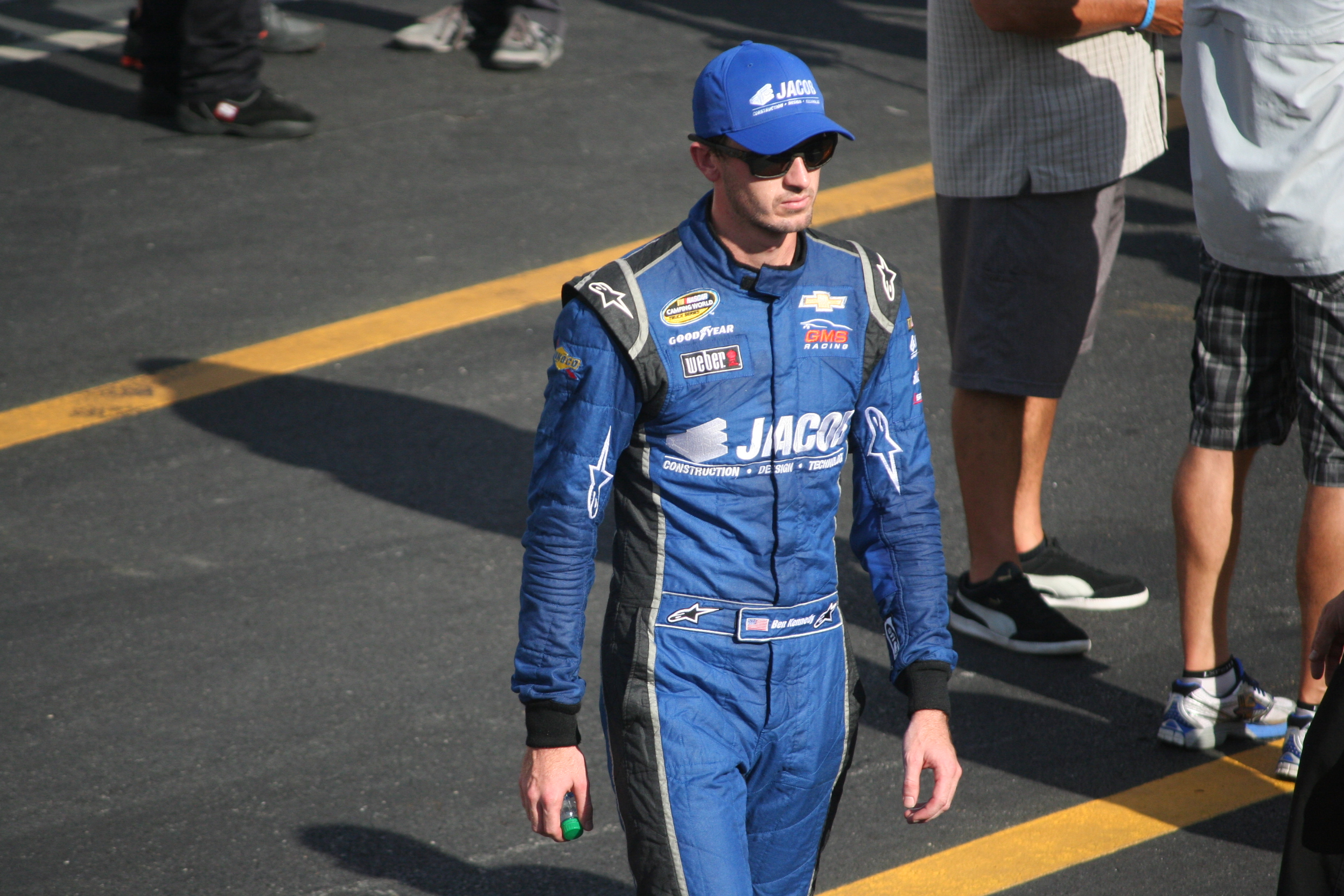
Ben Kennedy won the Rookie of the Year.

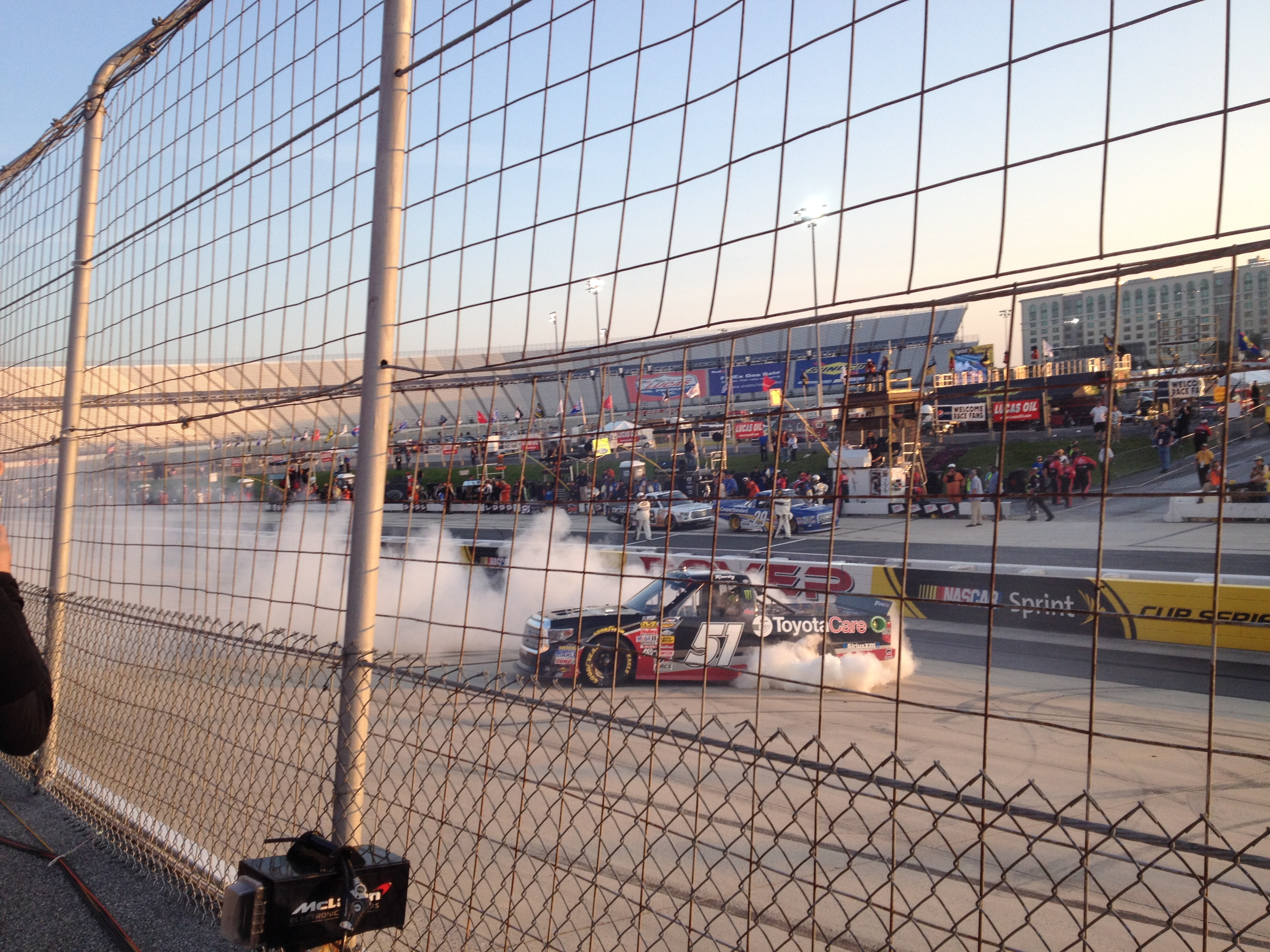
The No. 51 for Kyle Busch Motorsports won the Owner's championship. Also Toyota won the Manufacturers' championship with 18 wins and 1,028 points.

The 2014 NASCAR Camping World Truck Series was the 20th season of the Camping World Truck Series, the pickup truck racing series sanctioned by NASCAR in North America. The season was contested over twenty-two races, beginning with the NextEra Energy Resources 250 at Daytona International Speedway and ending with the Ford EcoBoost 200 at Homestead–Miami Speedway. Toyota entered as the reigning Manufacturers' Champion, while Matt Crafton entered as the defending Drivers' Champion, and ended the season with his second consecutive title.

== Teams and drivers ==
=== Complete schedule ===
Manufacturer	Team	No.	Driver(s)	Crew Chief
Chevrolet	GMS Racing	21	Joey Coulter	Jeff Stankiewicz
Chevrolet	MAKE Motorsports	50	Travis Kvapil 2	Randy Dean; Ken Evans; Tim Silva; Carl Long
Chevrolet	MAKE Motorsports	50	T. J. Bell 17	Randy Dean; Ken Evans; Tim Silva; Carl Long
Chevrolet	MAKE Motorsports	50	Derek White 1	Randy Dean; Ken Evans; Tim Silva; Carl Long
Chevrolet	MAKE Motorsports	50	Jordan Anderson 1	Randy Dean; Ken Evans; Tim Silva; Carl Long
Chevrolet	MAKE Motorsports	50	Wendell Chavous 1	Randy Dean; Ken Evans; Tim Silva; Carl Long
Chevrolet	MB Motorsports	63	Justin Jennings 18	Mike Mittler; Paul Andrews
Chevrolet	MB Motorsports	63	J. R. Heffner 2	Mike Mittler; Paul Andrews
Chevrolet	MB Motorsports	63	Scott Stenzel 2	Mike Mittler; Paul Andrews
Chevrolet	Norm Benning Racing	6	Norm Benning	Kevin Dargie
Chevrolet	NTS Motorsports	9	Brennan Newberry 10	Gere Kennon Jr. John Monsam; Doug Howe; Ryan McKinney; Chris Rice
Chevrolet	NTS Motorsports	9	Chase Pistone (R) 5	Gere Kennon Jr. John Monsam; Doug Howe; Ryan McKinney; Chris Rice
Chevrolet	NTS Motorsports	9	Justin Lofton 1	Gere Kennon Jr. John Monsam; Doug Howe; Ryan McKinney; Chris Rice
Chevrolet	NTS Motorsports	9	Jason White 2	Gere Kennon Jr. John Monsam; Doug Howe; Ryan McKinney; Chris Rice
Chevrolet	NTS Motorsports	9	Ron Hornaday Jr. 3	Gere Kennon Jr. John Monsam; Doug Howe; Ryan McKinney; Chris Rice
Chevrolet	NTS Motorsports	9	Ty Dillon 1	Gere Kennon Jr. John Monsam; Doug Howe; Ryan McKinney; Chris Rice
Chevrolet	NTS Motorsports	20	John King 1	Jeff Hensley; Chris Rice
Chevrolet	NTS Motorsports	20	Gray Gaulding (R) 9	Jeff Hensley; Chris Rice
Chevrolet	NTS Motorsports	20	Austin Dillon 5	Jeff Hensley; Chris Rice
Chevrolet	NTS Motorsports	20	Justin Lofton 3	Jeff Hensley; Chris Rice
Chevrolet	NTS Motorsports	20	Jason White 1	Jeff Hensley; Chris Rice
Chevrolet	NTS Motorsports	20	Daniel Hemric 1	Jeff Hensley; Chris Rice
Chevrolet	NTS Motorsports	20	Brennan Newberry 2	Ryan McKinney
Chevrolet	Peck Motorsports	07	Todd Peck 1	Keith Wolfe
Chevrolet	Rick Ware Racing	07	Enrique Contreras III 1	Doug Weddle
Chevrolet	SS-Green Light Racing; B. J. McLeod Motorsports	07	Michel Disdier 1	Bobby Dotter
Chevrolet	SS-Green Light Racing; B. J. McLeod Motorsports	07	Ray Black Jr. 2	Doug Weddle; Keith Wolfe; Rusty Ebersole
Chevrolet	SS-Green Light Racing; B. J. McLeod Motorsports	07	Blake Koch 1	Doug Weddle; Keith Wolfe; Rusty Ebersole
Chevrolet	SS-Green Light Racing; B. J. McLeod Motorsports	07	Jake Crum 1	Doug Weddle; Keith Wolfe; Rusty Ebersole
Chevrolet	SS-Green Light Racing; B. J. McLeod Motorsports	07	B. J. McLeod 6	Doug Weddle; Keith Wolfe; Rusty Ebersole
Chevrolet	SS-Green Light Racing; B. J. McLeod Motorsports	07	J. J. Yeley 1	Doug Weddle; Keith Wolfe; Rusty Ebersole
Chevrolet	SS-Green Light Racing; B. J. McLeod Motorsports	07	Korbin Forrister 2	Doug Weddle; Keith Wolfe; Rusty Ebersole
Chevrolet	SS-Green Light Racing; B. J. McLeod Motorsports	07	Todd Peck 1	Doug Weddle; Keith Wolfe; Rusty Ebersole
Chevrolet	SS-Green Light Racing; B. J. McLeod Motorsports	07	Todd Shafer 1	Doug Weddle; Keith Wolfe; Rusty Ebersole
Chevrolet	SS-Green Light Racing; B. J. McLeod Motorsports	07	Ryan Lynch 1	Doug Weddle; Keith Wolfe; Rusty Ebersole
Chevrolet	SS-Green Light Racing; B. J. McLeod Motorsports	07	Jimmy Weller III (R) 1	Jason Miller
Chevrolet	SS-Green Light Racing; B. J. McLeod Motorsports	07	Ray Courtemanche Jr. 1	Jason Miller
Chevrolet	SS-Green Light Racing; B. J. McLeod Motorsports	07	Jared Landers 1	Tam Topham
Chevrolet	SS-Green Light Racing; B. J. McLeod Motorsports	08	Jimmy Weller III (R) 9	Jason Miller; Keith Wolfe
Chevrolet	SS-Green Light Racing; B. J. McLeod Motorsports	08	Korbin Forrister 4	Jason Miller; Keith Wolfe
Chevrolet	SS-Green Light Racing; B. J. McLeod Motorsports	08	Chris Eggleston 1	Jason Miller; Keith Wolfe
Chevrolet	SS-Green Light Racing; B. J. McLeod Motorsports	08	Ray Black Jr. 5	Jason Miller; Keith Wolfe
Chevrolet	SS-Green Light Racing; B. J. McLeod Motorsports	08	Camden Murphy 1	Jason Miller; Keith Wolfe
Chevrolet	SS-Green Light Racing; B. J. McLeod Motorsports	08	Todd Shafer 1	Doug Weddle
Chevrolet	SS-Green Light Racing; B. J. McLeod Motorsports	08	B. J. McLeod 1	Bobby Dotter
Chevrolet	T3R2	99	Bryan Silas	Gary Cogswell; Cal Boprey
Chevrolet	Turner Scott Motorsports	31	Ben Kennedy (R)	Michael Shelton; Doug George
Chevrolet	Turner Scott Motorsports	32	Ryan Truex 1	Mike Hillman Jr. Shannon Rursch
Chevrolet	Turner Scott Motorsports	32	Ben Rhodes 4	Mike Hillman Jr. Shannon Rursch
Chevrolet	Turner Scott Motorsports	32	Tayler Malsam 12	Mike Hillman Jr. Shannon Rursch
Chevrolet	Turner Scott Motorsports	32	Kyle Larson 2	Mike Hillman Jr. Shannon Rursch
Chevrolet	Turner Scott Motorsports	32	Cameron Hayley 2	Mike Hillman Jr. Shannon Rursch
Chevrolet	Turner Scott Motorsports	32	Alex Guenette 1	Mike Hillman Jr. Shannon Rursch
Chevrolet	Young's Motorsports	02	Tyler Young (R)	Bryan Berry
Ford	Brad Keselowski Racing	19	Tyler Reddick (R) 16	Doug Randolph; Robert Huffman
Ford	Brad Keselowski Racing	19	Joey Logano 2	Doug Randolph; Robert Huffman
Ford	Brad Keselowski Racing	19	Brad Keselowski 3	Doug Randolph; Robert Huffman
Ford	Brad Keselowski Racing	19	Alex Tagliani 1	Doug Randolph; Robert Huffman
Ford	Brad Keselowski Racing	29	Ryan Blaney	Chad Kendrick
Toyota	Kyle Busch Motorsports	51	Kyle Busch 10	Eric Phillips
Toyota	Kyle Busch Motorsports	51	Erik Jones 12	Eric Phillips
Toyota	Kyle Busch Motorsports	54	Bubba Wallace	Jerry Baxter
Toyota	Red Horse Racing	17	Timothy Peters	Marcus Richmond
Toyota	Red Horse Racing	77	Germán Quiroga	Butch Hylton
Toyota	SWM-NEMCO Motorsports	8	Joe Nemechek 12	Jerry Babb
Toyota	SWM-NEMCO Motorsports	8	John Hunter Nemechek 10	Jerry Babb
Toyota	ThorSport Racing	13	Jeb Burton	Dennis Connor; Jeriod Prince
Toyota	ThorSport Racing	88	Matt Crafton	Carl Joiner Jr.
Toyota	ThorSport Racing	98	Johnny Sauter	Gene Wachtel; Dennis Connor; Jeff Hensley
Toyota	Win-Tron Racing	35	Mason Mingus (R) 16	Mark Rette; Trip Bruce; Greg Tester; Jeff Merritt; Dennis Connor; Mark Soronen
Toyota	Win-Tron Racing	35	Charles Lewandoski 1	Mark Rette; Trip Bruce; Greg Tester; Jeff Merritt; Dennis Connor; Mark Soronen
Toyota	Win-Tron Racing	35	Daniel Suárez 1	Mark Rette; Trip Bruce; Greg Tester; Jeff Merritt; Dennis Connor; Mark Soronen
Toyota	Win-Tron Racing	35	Peyton Sellers 1	Mark Rette; Trip Bruce; Greg Tester; Jeff Merritt; Dennis Connor; Mark Soronen
Toyota	Win-Tron Racing	35	Ryan Ellis 1	Mark Rette; Trip Bruce; Greg Tester; Jeff Merritt; Dennis Connor; Mark Soronen
Toyota	Win-Tron Racing	35	Akinori Ogata 1	Mark Rette; Trip Bruce; Greg Tester; Jeff Merritt; Dennis Connor; Mark Soronen
Toyota	Win-Tron Racing	35	Ross Chastain 1	Mark Rette; Trip Bruce; Greg Tester; Jeff Merritt; Dennis Connor; Mark Soronen
Chevrolet 15 RAM 7	Jennifer Jo Cobb Racing	10	Jennifer Jo Cobb	Steve Kuykendall

=== Limited schedule ===
Manufacturer	Team	No.	Driver(s)	Crew Chief	Rounds
Chevrolet	Adrian Carriers Racing	97	Jeff Choquette	Nicholas Carlson	1
Chevrolet	Bill Martel Racing	59	Kyle Martel	Bill Martel	2
Chevrolet	Billy Boat Motorsports	15	Mason Mingus (R)	Dan Deeringhoff; Ben Leslie	6
Chevrolet	B. J. McLeod Motorsports	45	Tommy Regan	Trip Bruce	1
Chevrolet	B. J. McLeod Motorsports	45	Matt Tifft	Trip Bruce	2
Chevrolet	B. J. McLeod Motorsports	0	Matt Tifft	Trip Bruce	1
Chevrolet	Brandonbilt Motorsports	86	Brandon Brown	Adam Brenner	3
Chevrolet	Cefalia Motorsports	12	Ted Minor	Garry Stephens	3
Chevrolet	Cefalia Motorsports	12	Eric Caudell	Garry Stephens	1
Chevrolet	GMS Racing	23	Spencer Gallagher	Ryan London; Harold Holly	9
Chevrolet	GMS Racing	23	Max Gresham	Ryan London; Harold Holly	5
Chevrolet	GMS Racing	33	Brandon Jones	Shane Huffman	2
Chevrolet	Turner Scott Motorsports	33	Brandon Jones	Shane Huffman	3
Chevrolet	Turner Scott Motorsports	30	Ron Hornaday Jr.	Shane Huffman; Shannon Rursch; Hal Ralston Jr. Doug George	13
Chevrolet	Turner Scott Motorsports	30	Cameron Hayley	Shane Huffman; Shannon Rursch; Hal Ralston Jr. Doug George	1
Chevrolet	Turner Scott Motorsports	42	Kyle Larson	Mike Hillman Jr.	1
Chevrolet	Young's Motorsports	42	Charles Lewandoski	William Sandlin	6
Chevrolet	Young's Motorsports	60	Charles Lewandoski	William Sandlin	1
Chevrolet	Haas Racing Development	00	Cole Custer	Joe Shear Jr.	9
Chevrolet	Jake Crum Racing	01	Jake Crum	Steve Kuykendall	1
Chevrolet	FDNY Racing	28	Ryan Ellis	Bob Rahilly; Dick Rahilly	4
Chevrolet	FDNY Racing	28	Bryan Dauzat	Bob Rahilly; Dick Rahilly	1
Chevrolet	MBM Motorsports	82	Derek White	Carl Long	1
Chevrolet	Mike Affarano Motorsports	03	Mike Affarano	David McClure	4
Chevrolet	Rick Ware Racing	74	Chris Cockrum	Christina Andrews	1
Chevrolet	DGM Racing	74	Alex Guenette	Mario Gosselin	1
Chevrolet	Dustin Hapka Racing	74	Dustin Hapka	Chad Frewaldt	1
Chevrolet	Mike Harmon Racing	74	Mike Harmon	Scott Stolzenberg; Gary Ritter; Jeff Spraker	3
Chevrolet	Mike Harmon Racing	74	Wendell Chavous	Scott Stolzenberg; Gary Ritter; Jeff Spraker	2
Chevrolet	Mike Harmon Racing	74	Jordan Anderson	Scott Stolzenberg; Gary Ritter; Jeff Spraker	1
Chevrolet	Norm Benning Racing	57	Ted Minor	Jason Whittal	1
Chevrolet	Norm Benning Racing	57	Adam Edwards	Brian Poff	3
Chevrolet	Norm Benning Racing	71	Adam Edwards	Brian Poff	1
Chevrolet	Norm Benning Racing	75	Adam Edwards	Brian Poff	1
Chevrolet	Henderson Motorsports	75	Caleb Holman	Butch Miller; Darrell Holman	5
Chevrolet	MAKE Motorsports	1	Milka Duno	Joe Lax	1
Chevrolet	NTS Motorsports	14	Michael Annett	John Monsam	1
Chevrolet	NTS Motorsports	14	Austin Dillon	John Monsam	1
Chevrolet	Peck Motorsports	40	Todd Peck	Keith Wolfe	4
Chevrolet	Rick Ware Racing	5	Cody Ware	George Church	1
Chevrolet	Richard Childress Racing	2	Austin Dillon	Nick Harrison	1
Chevrolet	Richard Childress Racing	3	Austin Dillon	Nick Harrison	1
Chevrolet	Richard Childress Racing	3	Ty Dillon	Danny Stockman Jr.	1
Chevrolet	RHT Racing	56	Raymond Terczak Jr.	Zach Terczak; Gregory Ward	3
Chevrolet	RSS Racing	39	Ryan Sieg	Kevin Starland	3
Chevrolet	RSS Racing	93	Jason White	Tony Wilson	1
Chevrolet	RSS Racing	93	Dustin Hapka	Chad Frewaldt	1
Ford	Charles Buchanan Racing	87	Chuck Buchanan Jr.	Craig Wood	1
Ford	Frank Ingram Racing	80	Jody Knowles	Wayne Hansard	4
Ford	Josh Williams Motorsports	66	Josh Williams	Kevin Caldwell	1 (Note: Entry was fielded in a collaboration with T3R2 Motorsports)
Ford	Mason Mitchell Motorsports	48	Mason Mitchell	Ricky Viers	1
Ford	RBR Enterprises	92	Ross Chastain	Tripp Bruce; Michael Hester	2
Ford	RBR Enterprises	92	Scott Riggs	Tripp Bruce; Michael Hester	2
Ford	RBR Enterprises	92	Corey LaJoie	Tripp Bruce; Michael Hester	2
Ford	RBR Enterprises	92	Austin Hill	Tripp Bruce; Michael Hester	2
RAM	Clay Greenfield Motorsports	68	Clay Greenfield	Woody Burns; Melvin Burns Jr.	2
RAM	NDS Motorsports	53	Andrew Ranger	Zach D'Ambra	1
Toyota	BRG Motorsports	58	Parker Kligerman	Josh Bragg	1
Toyota	Glenden Enterprises	84	Chris Fontaine	Kevin Ingram	2
Toyota	Ken Schrader Racing	52	Ken Schrader	Donald Richeson	1
Toyota	Red Horse Racing	7	Brian Ickler	Chris Carrier	5
Toyota	Venturini Motorsports	25	Justin Boston	Billy Venturini	1
Toyota	Wauters Motorsports	5	John Wes Townley	Mike Beam; Richie Wauters	8
Toyota	Athenian Motorsports	05	John Wes Townley	Mike Beam; Michael Shelton	11
Toyota	Athenian Motorsports	05	Clint Bowyer	Mike Beam; Michael Shelton	1
Toyota	Athenian Motorsports	05	Travis Kvapil	Mike Beam; Michael Shelton	1
Chevrolet 2 Ford 2	Empire Racing	82	Sean Corr	Mike Cheek	1
Chevrolet 2 Ford 2	Empire Racing	82	Jake Crum	Mike Cheek	1
Chevrolet 2 Ford 2	Empire Racing	82	Cody Erickson	Mike Cheek	2
Chevrolet 13 RAM 3	Jennifer Jo Cobb Racing	0	Ryan Ellis	Joe Cobb; Michael Nimmo; Jeremy Nowak; Michael Stewart	4
Chevrolet 13 RAM 3	Jennifer Jo Cobb Racing	0	Willie Allen	Joe Cobb; Michael Nimmo; Jeremy Nowak; Michael Stewart	1
Chevrolet 13 RAM 3	Jennifer Jo Cobb Racing	0	Caleb Roark	Joe Cobb; Michael Nimmo; Jeremy Nowak; Michael Stewart	10
Chevrolet 13 RAM 3	Jennifer Jo Cobb Racing	0	Joe Cobb	Joe Cobb; Michael Nimmo; Jeremy Nowak; Michael Stewart	1
Chevrolet 8 RAM 4	MB Motorsports	36	Scott Stenzel	Mike Mittler	5
Chevrolet 8 RAM 4	MB Motorsports	36	Blake Koch	Mike Mittler	3
Chevrolet 8 RAM 4	MB Motorsports	36	Justin Jennings	Mike Mittler	3
Chevrolet 8 RAM 4	MB Motorsports	36	Tyler Tanner	Mike Mittler	1

== Schedule ==
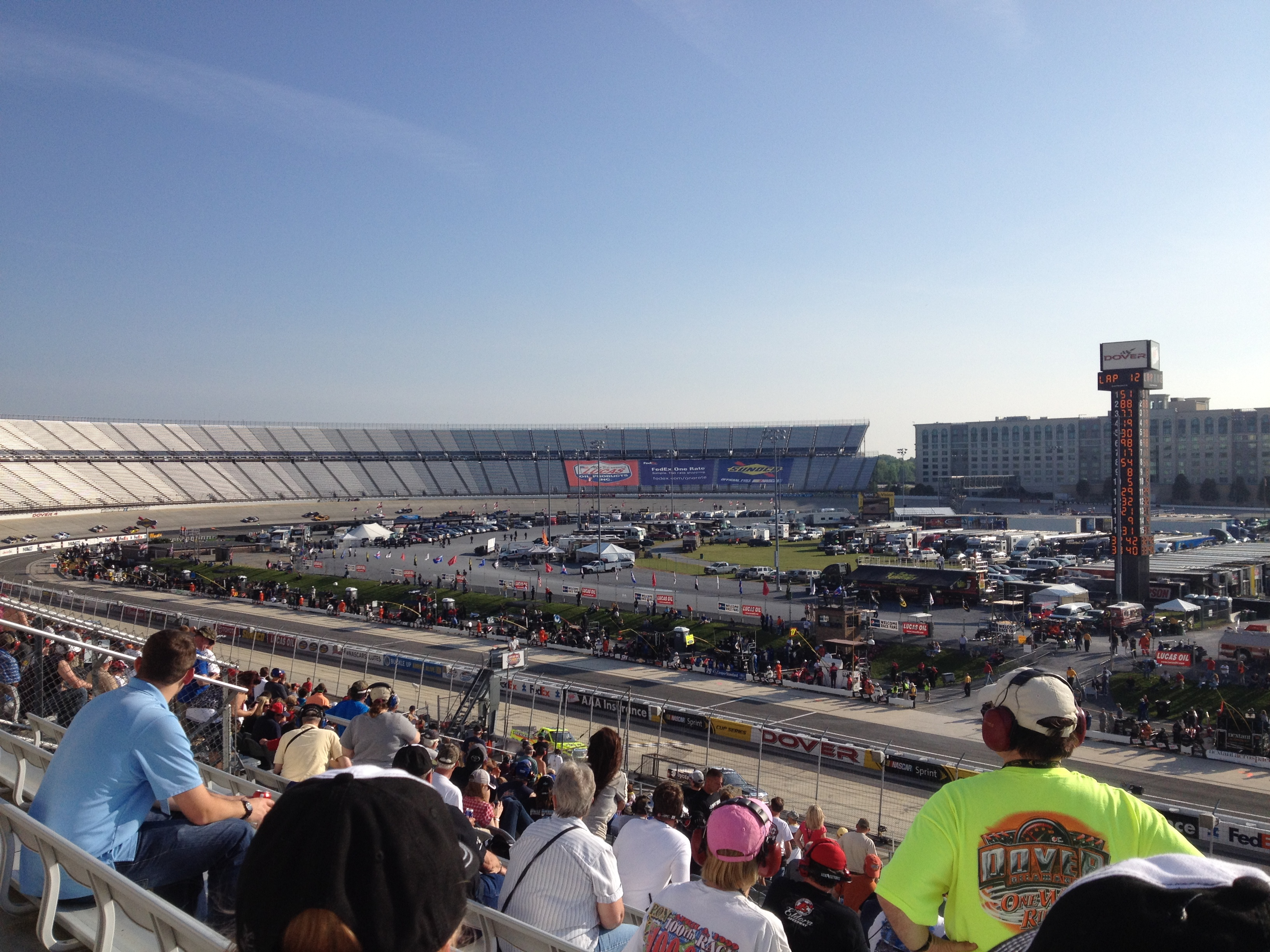
The Lucas Oil 200 at Dover International Speedway in May

The final calendar was released on October 25, 2013, containing 22 races. Rockingham Speedway has been removed from the schedule due to financial issues, while the second race at Iowa Speedway has also been dropped. Gateway Motorsports Park will return to the schedule for the first time since 2010, and New Hampshire Motor Speedway will also feature in the schedule for the first time since 2011. Fox Sports 1 will air all of the races except for Talladega which will air on FOX, which makes a return to airing the Truck Series for the first time since 2009.

No.	Race title	Track	Location	Date	TV
1	NextEra Energy Resources 250	Daytona International Speedway	Daytona Beach, Florida	February 21	FS1
2	Kroger 250	Martinsville Speedway	Martinsville, Virginia	March 30†	FS1
3	SFP 250	Kansas Speedway	Kansas City, Kansas	May 9	FS1
4	North Carolina Education Lottery 200	Charlotte Motor Speedway	Concord, North Carolina	May 16	FS1
5	Lucas Oil 200	Dover International Speedway	Dover, Delaware	May 30	FS1
6	WinStar World Casino & Resort 400	Texas Motor Speedway	Fort Worth, Texas	June 6	FS1
7	Drivin' for Linemen 200	Gateway Motorsports Park	Madison, Illinois	June 14	FS1
8	UNOH 225	Kentucky Speedway	Sparta, Kentucky	June 26	FS1
9	American Ethanol 200	Iowa Speedway	Newton, Iowa	July 11	FS1
10	Mudsummer Classic	Eldora Speedway	Allen Township, Darke County, Ohio	July 23	FS1
11	Pocono Mountains 150	Pocono Raceway	Long Pond, Pennsylvania	August 2	FS1
12	Careers for Veterans 200	Michigan International Speedway	Cambridge Township, Michigan	August 16	FS1
13	UNOH 200	Bristol Motor Speedway	Bristol, Tennessee	August 21†	FS1
14	Chevrolet Silverado 250	Canadian Tire Motorsport Park	Bowmanville, Ontario, Canada	August 31	FS1
15	Lucas Oil 225	Chicagoland Speedway	Joliet, Illinois	September 13†	FS1
16	UNOH 175	New Hampshire Motor Speedway	Loudon, New Hampshire	September 20	FS1
17	Rhino Linings 350	Las Vegas Motor Speedway	Las Vegas, Nevada	September 27	FS1
18	Fred's 250	Talladega Superspeedway	Lincoln, Alabama	October 18	FOX
19	Kroger 200	Martinsville Speedway	Martinsville, Virginia	October 25	FS1
20	WinStar World Casino & Resort 350	Texas Motor Speedway	Fort Worth, Texas	October 31	FS1
21	Lucas Oil 150	Phoenix International Raceway	Avondale, Arizona	November 7	FS1
22	Ford EcoBoost 200	Homestead–Miami Speedway	Homestead, Florida	November 14	FS1
†: The Kroger 250, UNOH 200, and Lucas Oil 225 were postponed a day due to persistent rain.

== Results and standings ==
=== Races ===
No.	Race	Pole position	Most laps led	Winning driver	Manufacturer
1	NextEra Energy Resources 250	Ben Kennedy	Ben Kennedy	Kyle Busch	Toyota
2	Kroger 250	Bubba Wallace	Ron Hornaday Jr.	Matt Crafton	Toyota
3	SFP 250	Kyle Busch	Kyle Busch	Kyle Busch	Toyota
4	North Carolina Education Lottery 200	Kyle Busch	Kyle Busch	Kyle Busch	Toyota
5	Lucas Oil 200	Kyle Busch	Kyle Busch	Kyle Busch	Toyota
6	WinStar World Casino & Resort 400	Justin Lofton	Matt Crafton	Matt Crafton	Toyota
7	Drivin' for Linemen 200	Cole Custer	Bubba Wallace	Bubba Wallace	Toyota
8	UNOH 225	Kyle Busch	Kyle Busch	Kyle Busch	Toyota
9	American Ethanol 200	Bubba Wallace	Erik Jones	Erik Jones	Toyota
10	Mudsummer Classic	Erik Jones	Bubba Wallace	Bubba Wallace	Toyota
11	Pocono Mountains 150	Kyle Larson	Austin Dillon	Austin Dillon	Chevrolet
12	Careers for Veterans 200	Ryan Blaney	Bubba Wallace	Johnny Sauter	Toyota
13	UNOH 200	Kyle Busch	Brad Keselowski	Brad Keselowski	Ford
14	Chevrolet Silverado 250	Alex Tagliani	Ryan Blaney	Ryan Blaney	Ford
15	Lucas Oil 225	Johnny Sauter	Kyle Busch	Kyle Busch	Toyota
16	UNOH 175	Cole Custer	Cole Custer	Cole Custer	Chevrolet
17	Rhino Linings 350	Ryan Blaney	Bubba Wallace	Erik Jones	Toyota
18	Fred's 250	Tyler Reddick	Ryan Blaney/Timothy Peters	Timothy Peters	Toyota
19	Kroger 200	Bubba Wallace	Bubba Wallace	Bubba Wallace	Toyota
20	WinStar World Casino & Resort 350	Tyler Reddick	Kyle Busch	Kyle Busch	Toyota
21	Lucas Oil 150	Erik Jones	Erik Jones	Erik Jones	Toyota
22	Ford EcoBoost 200	Kyle Larson	Kyle Larson	Bubba Wallace	Toyota

=== Drivers' standings ===
(key) Bold - Pole position awarded by time. Italics - Pole position earned by final practice results or rainout. * – Most laps led.

Pos	Driver	DAY	MAR	KAN	CLT	DOV	TEX	GTW	KEN	IOW	ELD	POC	MCH	BRI	MSP	CHI	NHA	LVS	TAL	MAR	TEX	PHO	HOM	Points
1	Matt Crafton	13	1	2	2	23	1*	26	6	3	9	14	2	4	6	2	3	3	14	3	5	2	9	833
2	Ryan Blaney	6	5	22	22	2	4	7	3	2	3	5	**21**	13	1*	12	10	**6**	5*	5	9	4	5	813
3	Bubba Wallace	26	2	15	26	16	10	1*	2	**13**	1*	8	11*	2	12	6	2	2*	9	**1***	26	6	1	799
4	Johnny Sauter	3	4	21	6	3	7	4	9	18	8	2	1	5	8	**14**	4	14	31	7	16	9	10	773
5	Timothy Peters	2	6	14	5	10	24	3	4	31	16	12	7	26	10	17	11	4	1*	2	3	19	3	746
6	Germán Quiroga	10	7	7	9	9	23	2	15	5	12	22	6	14	2	19	15	16	29	10	17	26	15	683
7	Joey Coulter	32	17	12	12	5	9	11	12	4	14	3	9	7	13	8	9	10	13	30	6	30	23	680
8	Jeb Burton	7	21	6	15	18	12	18	27	14	7	16	8	11	17	5	12	8	16	12	2	25	13	679
9	Ben Kennedy **(R)**	15*	3	20	8	7	14	14	10	6	13	13	19	21	15	7	13	7	28	16	15	11	17	679
10	Bryan Silas	17	33	19	13	25	8	16	16	29	23	21	15	32	19	10	20	12	12	31	19	14	18	548
11	Mason Mingus **(R)**	28	29	10	20	26	19	12	19	16	22	17	16	22	14	16	17	18	32	15	13	13	29	545
12	Tyler Reddick **(R)**	12	16			8	21	13		9	11	23				4	8	15	**4**	6	**4**	10	6	539
13	Tyler Young **(R)**	34	31	23	28	17	15	17	20	17	15	26	14	18	18	11	24	19	17	19	14	18	24	529
14	Ron Hornaday Jr.	5	9*	8	19	11	6	5	8	21	2	7	3	3				20	34		12			526
15	John Wes Townley	14	20	11	4	12	5	8	21	22	19	INJ	INJ	29		15	18	11	8	33	20	33	35	499
16	Jennifer Jo Cobb	21	27	13	16	20	20	27	24	30	DNQ	24	20	27	23	21	22	22	18	28	24	23	32	444
17	Norm Benning	20	28	18	17	28	22	22	26	26	27	20	22	25	22	27	27	24	20	25	28	28	34	432
18	Erik Jones		18				11	23		1*	**29**	6			3		7	1	6	4		**1***		426
19	Joe Nemechek	8		9	11		3		14			10	10			9		17	10		8		8	413
20	Justin Jennings	16	25	16	29	19	26	32	18	15		32	23	16	26	22	29	21	35	35	23	34	22	410
21	Tayler Malsam			5	25		13	10	13	23			4			23		9	2		21		19	362
22	T. J. Bell			17	18	15	18	19	25	24	21	29	25	28	21	26	25	25		36	25			352
23	John Hunter Nemechek		11			6		15		10	6			6	25		5			13		7		337
24	Brennan Newberry	25		24		27	16							17	7	13	14		11	18	11	16		329
25	Cole Custer		12			14		**6**		8				8	9		**1***			29		3		302
26	Gray Gaulding **(R)**		19			21		20			20			23	4		16			14		17		243
27	Spencer Gallagher		32	30						11		15	13					13	3			31	14	234
28	Jimmy Weller III **(R)**	9		25	14	30	17		22				24	19				26	30					225
29	Ray Black Jr.		24					24				28				18	21				18		28	148
30	Chase Pistone **(R)**		13					9	28	12	17													141
31	Brandon Jones		15			4								20						32		12		138
32	Max Gresham				31				11					12						22	7			137
33	Justin Lofton				10		**2**			20		9												135
34	Caleb Roark							31		35		31	29		28	28	28	29			30		36	135
35	Ben Rhodes		8			22								9								5		132
36	Korbin Forrister		26					21		33	24								19			15		126
37	Brian Ickler	33	10	27	23													5						122
38	Caleb Holman	27	22						23					15						11				122
39	B. J. McLeod						25					30		34	27		26	27				32		107
40	Cameron Hayley														11		6				10			105
41	Scott Stenzel			31^{1}				28							24	29		28	22				33	100
42	Todd Peck	DNQ				33						25	27			20							26	89
43	Matt Tifft																			8		20	21	83
44	Charles Lewandoski	Wth		29	33^{1}	32		30	31	34								30						78
45	Ross Chastain	30	14																				11	77
46	Brandon Brown									25							19			24				64
47	Chris Fontaine	19																	7					62
48	Corey LaJoie								17					10										61
49	Jody Knowles										28			31						34		22		61
50	Scott Riggs				24	13																		51
51	Jake Crum				21	29								33										49
52	J. R. Heffner										18						23							47
53	Wendell Chavous																			27		27	31	47
54	Alex Guenette		36																	9				43
55	Austin Hill																			26			20	43
56	Ken Schrader										4													40
57	Andrew Ranger														5									40
58	Jeff Choquette									7														37
59	Clay Greenfield		30																21					37
60	Todd Shafer			26												25								37
61	Kyle Martel											27											25	36
62	Jordan Anderson																					24	30	34
63	Raymond Terczak Jr.		35			31				32														34
64	Daniel Hemric																						12	32
65	Ted Minor		Wth					25								31	30^{1}							32
66	Mason Mitchell																						16	28
67	Peyton Sellers																			17				27
68	Chris Eggleston									19														26
69	Ray Courtemanche Jr.														20									24
70	Enrique Contreras III																			20				24
71	Camden Murphy																			21				23
72	Tyler Tanner																					21		23
73	Ryan Lynch																				22			22
74	Cody Erickson										DNQ									23				21
75	John King	23																						21
76	Mike Affarano										30^{1}			DNQ		24^{1}			24					21
77	Michel Disdier	24																						20
78	Derek White																		26				27^{1}	18
79	Dustin Hapka									27										DNQ				17
80	Eric Caudell									28														16
81	Akinori Ogata																					29		15
82	Justin Boston													30										14
83	Sean Corr	31																						13
84	Josh Williams		34																					10
85	Chris Cockrum	35																						9
86	Tommy Regan									36														8
87	Bryan Dauzat													36										8
	Joe Cobb										DNQ													0
	Jared Landers										DNQ													0
	Chuck Buchanan Jr.																			DNQ				0
Ineligible for Camping World Truck championship points
Pos	Driver	DAY	MAR	KAN	CLT	DOV	TEX	GTW	KEN	IOW	ELD	POC	MCH	BRI	MSP	CHI	NHA	LVS	TAL	MAR	TEX	PHO	HOM	Points
	Kyle Busch	1		**1***	**1***	1*			**1***				5	**24**		1*					1*		4	
	Austin Dillon			4	7				7		10	1*	17			3						8		
	Brad Keselowski				3				5					1*										
	Kyle Larson										26	**18**											**2***	
	Joey Logano			3									18											
	Ryan Truex	4																						
	Clint Bowyer											4												
	Ty Dillon										5												7	
	Jason White	36										11	12					23						
	Ryan Sieg	11				24													33					
	Daniel Suárez																		15					
	Alex Tagliani														**16**									
	Ryan Ellis	18		28	27	34	27		32			19							23		31			
	Travis Kvapil	22	23										26											
	Michael Annett										25													
	Milka Duno																		25					
	Mike Harmon															32			36		27			
	Cody Ware																		27					
	Adam Edwards							29^{1}	30^{1}				28^{1}			30^{1}					29			
	Parker Kligerman	29																						
	J. J. Yeley				QL				29															
	Blake Koch				30	35								35							32			
	Willie Allen				32^{1}																			
Pos	Driver	DAY	MAR	KAN	CLT	DOV	TEX	GTW	KEN	IOW	ELD	POC	MCH	BRI	MSP	CHI	NHA	LVS	TAL	MAR	TEX	PHO	HOM	Points
^{1} – Post entry, driver and owner did not score points.

=== Owners' championship (Top 15) ===
Pos.	No.	Car Owner	Driver	Races																						Points
Pos.	No.	Car Owner	Driver	DAY	MAR	KAN	CLT	DOV	TEX	GTW	KEN	IOW	ELD	POC	MCH	BRI	MSP	CHI	NHA	LVS	TAL	MAR	TEX	PHO	HOM	Points
1	51	Kyle Busch	Kyle Busch	1		**1***	**1***	1*			**1***				5	**24**		1*					1*		4	857
1	51	Kyle Busch	Erik Jones		18				11	23		1*	**29**	6			3		7	1	6	4		**1***		857
2	88	Rhonda Thorson	Matt Crafton	13	1	2	2	23	1*	26	6	3	9	14	2	4	6	2	3	3	14	3	5	2	9	833
3	29	Brad Keselowski	Ryan Blaney	6	5	22	22	2	4	7	3	2	3	5	**21**	13	1*	12	10	**6**	5*	5	9	4	5	813
4	54	Kyle Busch	Bubba Wallace	26	2	15	26	16	10	1*	2	**13**	1*	8	11*	2	12	6	2	2*	9	**1***	26	6	1	799
5	98	Mike Curb	Johnny Sauter	3	4	21	6	3	7	4	9	18	8	2	1	5	8	**14**	4	14	31	7	16	9	10	773
6	19	Brad Keselowski	Tyler Reddick **(R)**	12	16			8	21	13		9	11	23				4	8	15	**4**	6	**4**	10	6	755
6	19	Brad Keselowski	Joey Logano			3									18											755
6	19	Brad Keselowski	Brad Keselowski				3				5					1*										755
6	19	Brad Keselowski	Alex Tagliani														**16**									755
7	8	Sidney Mauldin	Joe Nemechek	8		9	11		3		14			10	10			9		17	10		8		8	750
7	8	Sidney Mauldin	John Hunter Nemechek		11			6		15		10	6			6	25		5			13		7		750
8	17	Tom Deloach	Timothy Peters	2	6	14	5	10	24	3	4	31	16	12	7	26	10	17	11	4	1*	2	3	19	3	746
9	32	Harry Scott Jr.	Ryan Truex	4																						686
9	32	Harry Scott Jr.	Ben Rhodes		8			22								9								5		686
9	32	Harry Scott Jr.	Tayler Malsam			5	25		13	10	13	23			4			23		9	2		21		19	686
9	32	Harry Scott Jr.	Kyle Larson										26	**18**												686
9	32	Harry Scott Jr.	Cameron Hayley														11		6							686
9	32	Harry Scott Jr.	Alex Guenette																			9				686
10	77	Tom Deloach	Germán Quiroga	10	7	7	9	9	23	2	15	5	12	22	6	14	2	19	15	16	29	10	17	26	15	683
11	21	Maurice J. Gallagher Jr.	Joey Coulter	32	17	12	12	5	9	11	12	4	14	3	9	7	13	8	9	10	13	30	6	30	23	680
12	13	Duke Thorson	Jeb Burton	7	21	6	15	18	12	18	27	14	7	16	8	11	17	5	12	8	16	12	2	25	13	679
13	31	Steve Turner	Ben Kennedy **(R)**	15*	3	20	8	7	14	14	10	6	13	13	19	21	15	7	13	7	28	16	15	11	17	679
14	20	Bob Newberry	John King	23																						658
14	20	Bob Newberry	Gray Gaulding **(R)**		19			21		20			20			23	4		16			14		17		658
14	20	Bob Newberry	Austin Dillon			4	7				7				17			3								658
14	20	Bob Newberry	Justin Lofton						**2**			20		9												658
14	20	Bob Newberry	Jason White																	23						658
14	20	Bob Newberry	Daniel Hemric																						12	658
14	20	Bob Newberry	Brennan Newberry																		11		11			658
15	9	Joe Denette	Brennan Newberry	25		24		27	16							17	7	13	14			18		16		606
15	9	Joe Denette	Chase Pistone **(R)**		13					9	28	12	17													606
15	9	Joe Denette	Justin Lofton				9																			606
15	9	Joe Denette	Jason White											11	12											606
15	9	Joe Denette	Ron Hornaday Jr.																	20	34		12			606
15	9	Joe Denette	Ty Dillon																						7	606
Pos.	No.	Car Owner	Driver	DAY	MAR	KAN	CLT	DOV	TEX	GTW	KEN	IOW	ELD	POC	MCH	BRI	MSP	CHI	NHA	LVS	TAL	MAR	TEX	PHO	HOM	Points
Pos.	No.	Car Owner	Driver	Races																						Points

=== Manufacturers' championship ===
Pos	Manufacturer	Wins	Points
1	Toyota	18	**1,028**
2	Chevrolet	2	**901**
3	Ford	2	**884**
4	Ram	0	**175**

== See also ==
- 2014 NASCAR Sprint Cup Series
- 2014 NASCAR Nationwide Series
- 2014 NASCAR K&N Pro Series East
- 2014 NASCAR K&N Pro Series West
- 2014 NASCAR Whelen Modified Tour
- 2014 NASCAR Whelen Southern Modified Tour
- 2014 NASCAR Canadian Tire Series
- 2014 NASCAR Toyota Series
- 2014 NASCAR Whelen Euro Series
