= Advanced Courthouse Road Redoubt =

Archaeological site in Virginia, United States

- Redoubt #2
- U.S. National Register of Historic Places
- Virginia Landmarks Register
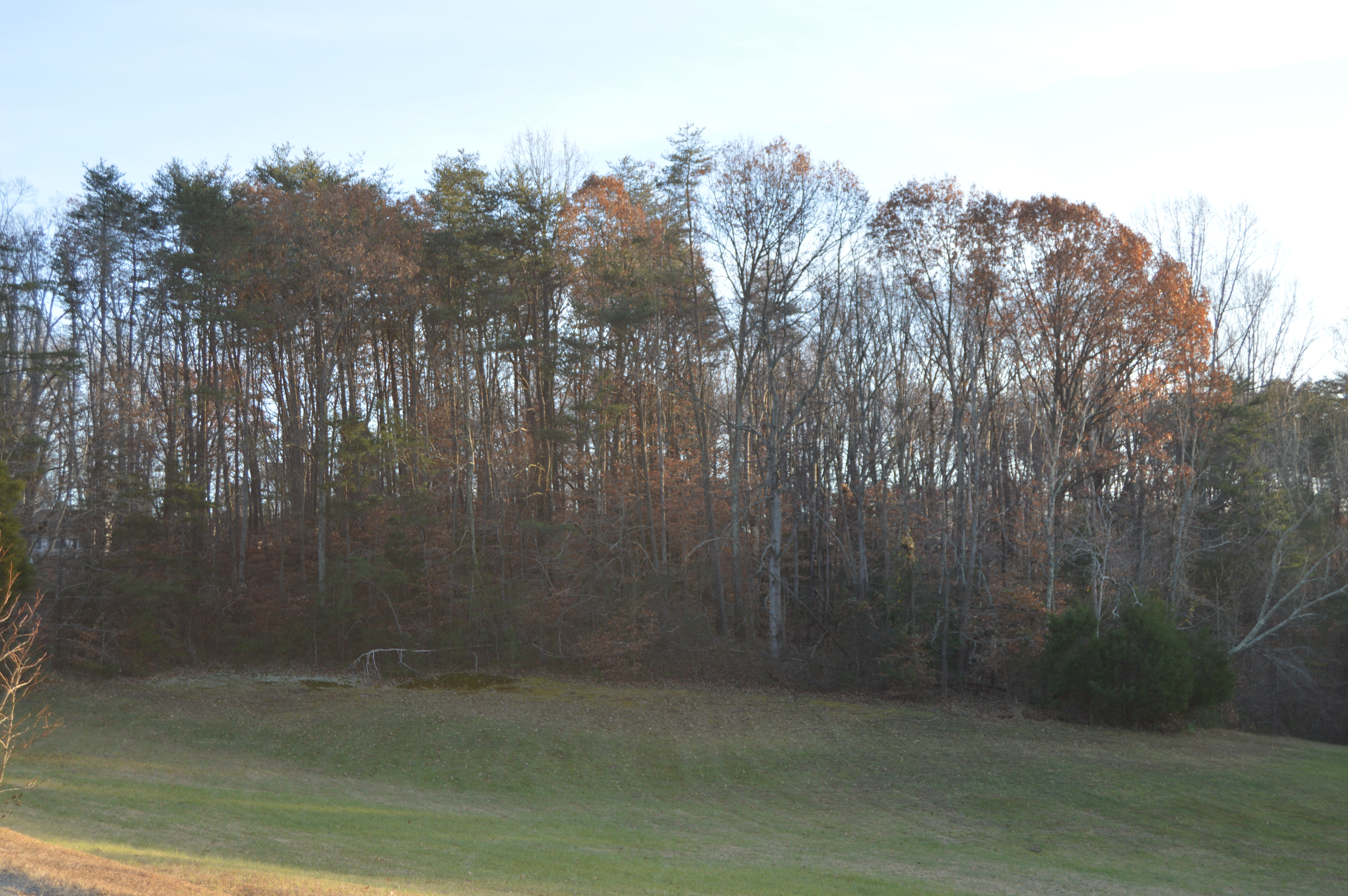
- Overview from north

- Location within Northern Virginia Location within Virginia Location within the United States
- Nearest city: Stafford, Virginia
- Coordinates: 38°23′35.9″N 77°21′20.9″W
- Area: 4.6 acres (1.9 ha)
- Built: 1863
- Built by: Lt. C.F. Cross
- NRHP reference No.: 06000051
- VLR No.: 089-5057

Significant dates
- Added to NRHP: February 14, 2006
- Designated VLR: December 7, 2005

Advanced Courthouse Road Redoubt is a historic archaeological site located near Stafford, Stafford County, Virginia. The site was the central of the three, perhaps four, Federal defensive fortifications ordered constructed in early (February) 1863 during the American Civil War to protect the approaches to the Union supply depot at Aquia Creek Landing, Stafford, Virginia. Advanced Courthouse Road Redoubt is an earthen field fortification that is nearly 95 feet square.

It was listed on the National Register of Historic Places in 2006.
