= Stafford, Virginia =

- Census-designated place
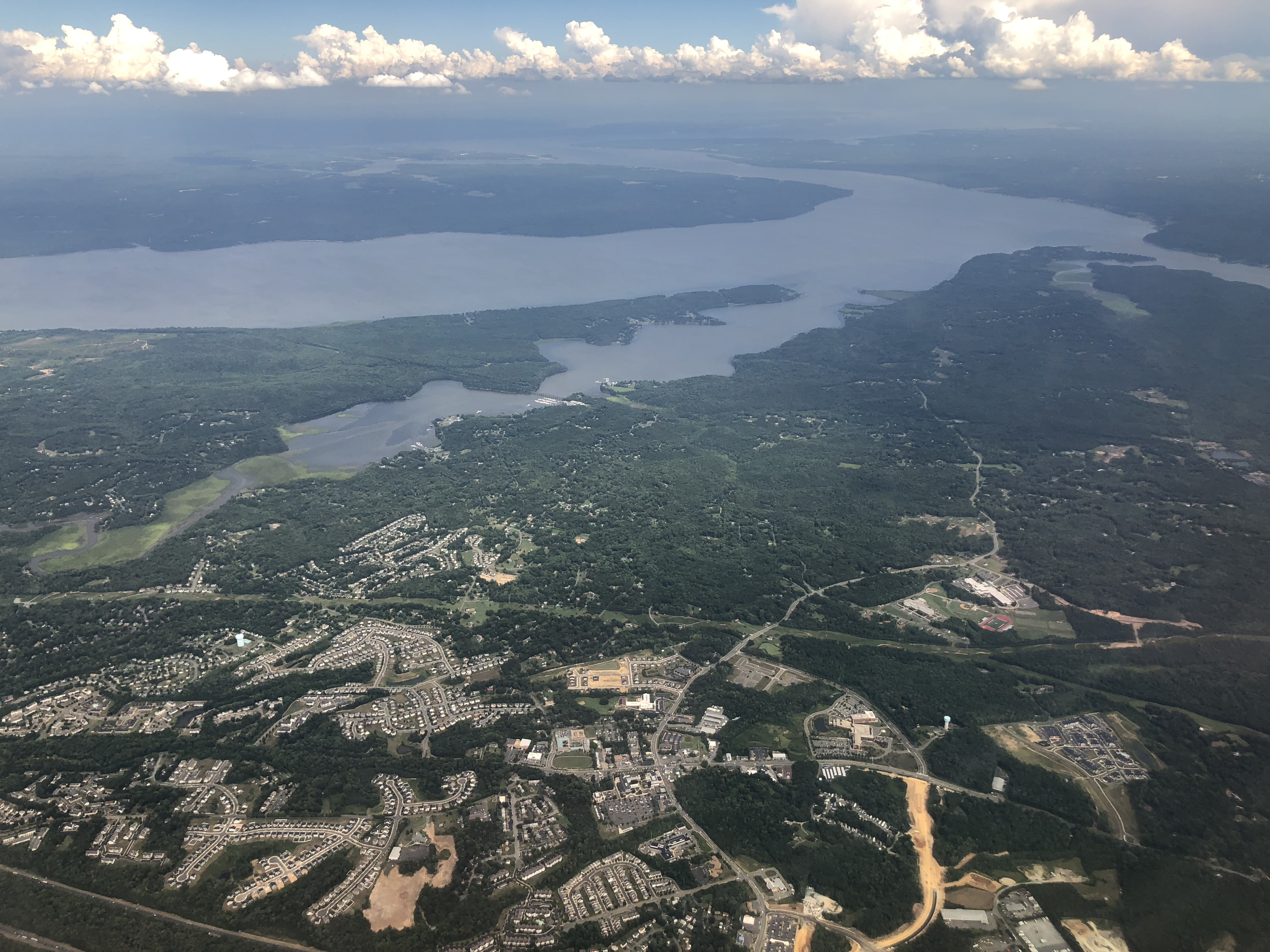
- Aerial view of Stafford

- Location in Stafford County and the state of Virginia.
- Coordinates: 38°25′19″N 77°24′30″W
- Country: United States
- State: Virginia
- County: Stafford

Area
  - Total: 4.27 sq mi (11.07 km^{2})

Population (2020)
  - Total: 5,370
  - Density: 1,260/sq mi (485/km^{2})
- Time zone: UTC−5 (Eastern (EST))
  - Summer (DST): UTC−4 (EDT)
- ZIP codes: 22554, 22556
- Area code: 540

Stafford, Also known as Stafford Courthouse, is a census-designated place in and the county seat of Stafford County, Virginia, United States. The population was 5,370 as of the 2020 census. It lies 10 miles (16 km) north of Fredericksburg, approximately 40 miles (64 km) south of Washington, D.C., and about 60 miles (97 km) north of Richmond, the state capital. Marine Corps Base Quantico is located north of the community. Stafford Courthouse is located at the intersections of U.S. Route 1 and Courthouse Road.

== History ==
English sea captain Samuel Argall abducted Pocahontas near this area in April 1613 in an attempt to secure release of some English prisoners held by her father. She married English colonist John Rolfe in 1614. They sailed in 1616 to England where Pocahontas died in 1617.

It was a stop on the Richmond, Fredericksburg and Potomac Railroad in the nineteenth Century; CSX Transportation is the RF&P's successor today.

Accokeek Furnace Archeological Site, Aquia Church, Public Quarry at Government Island, Advanced Courthouse Road Redoubt, and Stafford Training School are listed on the National Register of Historic Places.

In 2025, the United States Immigration and Customs Enforcement Agency began planning to house between 5,000 and 10,000 detainees in warehouses in Stafford prior to their deportation.

== Demographics ==
Historical population
Census	Pop.	Note	%±
2020	5,370		—
U.S. Decennial Census; 2010 2020

Stafford Courthouse was first listed as a census designated place in the 2010 U.S. census.

== Notable people ==
- Traci Hunter Abramson, novelist
- Erin Cahill, actress
- Palmer Hayden, American Painter
- Gary Jennings Jr., NFL Wide Receiver
- Pocahontas, Native American woman belonging to the Powhatan people, notable for her association with the colonial settlement at Jamestown
- Elijah Sarratt, professional American football player for the Baltimore Ravens, former collegiate American football player and national champion
- Joey Slye, American football kicker for the Washington Commanders
- Raymond Terczak Jr., racing driver
