= Raymond Terczak Jr. =

American racing driver

- Born: April 5, 1968 (age 58); Stafford, Virginia, U.S.

NASCAR FedEx Freight Truck Series career
- 3 races run over 1 year
- Truck no., team: RHT Motorsports
- 2014 position: 62nd
- Best finish: 62nd (2014)
- First race: 2014 Kroger 250 (Martinsville)
- Last race: 2014 American Ethanol 200 (Iowa)
Wins	Top tens	Poles
0	0	0

Raymond Terczak Jr. (born April 5, 1968) is an American professional stock car racing driver and owner. He last competed in the NASCAR Camping World Truck Series, driving the No. 56 for his family-owned team RHT Motorsports.

== Motorsports career results ==
=== NASCAR ===
(key) (Bold – Pole position awarded by qualifying time. Italics – Pole position earned by points standings or practice time. * – Most laps led.)

==== Camping World Truck Series ====
NASCAR Camping World Truck Series results
Year	Team	No.	Make	1	2	3	4	5	6	7	8	9	10	11	12	13	14	15	16	17	18	19	20	21	22	NCWTC	Pts	Ref
2014	RHT Motorsports	56	Chevy	DAY	MAR; 35	KAN	CLT	DOV; 31	TEX	GTW	KEN	IOW; 32	ELD	POC	MCH	BRI	MSP	CHI	NHA	LVS	TAL	MAR	TEX	PHO	HOM	62nd	34	
