= Dustin Hapka =

American racing driver (born 1983)

- Born: March 9, 1983 (age 43); Grand Forks, North Dakota, U.S.

NASCAR FedEx Freight Truck Series career
- 1 race run over 1 year
- 2014 position: 78th
- Best finish: 78th (2014)
- First race: 2014 American Ethanol 200 (Iowa)
Wins	Top tens	Poles
0	0	0

Dustin Hapka (born March 9, 1983) is an American professional stock car racing driver. He has raced in the NASCAR Camping World Truck Series and ARCA Racing Series.

== Motorsports career results ==
=== NASCAR ===
(key) (Bold – Pole position awarded by qualifying time. Italics – Pole position earned by points standings or practice time. * – Most laps led.)

==== Camping World Truck Series ====
NASCAR Camping World Truck Series results
Year	Team	No.	Make	1	2	3	4	5	6	7	8	9	10	11	12	13	14	15	16	17	18	19	20	21	22	NCWTC	Pts	Ref
2014	Dustin Hapka Racing	74	Chevy	DAY	MAR	KAN	CLT	DOV	TEX	GTW	KEN	IOW; 27	ELD	POC	MCH	BRI	MSP	CHI	NHA	LVS	TAL					78th	17	
2014	RSS Racing	93	Chevy																			MAR; DNQ	TEX	PHO	HOM	78th	17	

=== ARCA Racing Series ===
(key) (Bold – Pole position awarded by qualifying time. Italics – Pole position earned by points standings or practice time. * – Most laps led.)

ARCA Racing Series results
Year	Team	No.	Make	1	2	3	4	5	6	7	8	9	10	11	12	13	14	15	16	17	18	19	20	ARSC	Pts	Ref
2012	Hixson Motorsports	2	Chevy	DAY	MOB	SLM	TAL	TOL	ELK; 18	POC	MCH	WIN	NJE	IOW	CHI	IRP	POC	BLN	ISF	MAD	SLM	DSF	KAN; 32	89th	210	
